= 2022 Copa América Femenina Group B =

The 2022 Copa América Femenina Group B was the second of two sets in the group stage of the 2022 Copa América Femenina that took place from 9 July 2022 to 21 July 2022. The group competition consisted of Argentina, Brazil, Peru, Uruguay, and Venezuela. The top two teams automatically qualified for the top four knockout stage, while third place moved on to a fifth place match against the third place finisher of Group A. In the knockout stage and fifth place match, the top three qualified to the 2023 FIFA Women's World Cup, fourth and fifth place continued to the 2023 FIFA Women's World Cup repêchage, and sixth place was eliminated.

== Teams ==
| Draw position | Team | Pot | Finals appearance | Previous best performance | FIFA Rankings |
|---|---|---|---|---|---|
| A1 | Brazil | 1 | 9th | Champions (1991, 1995, 1998, 2003, 2010, 2014, 2018) | 9 |
| A2 | Argentina | 2 | 8th | Champions (2006) | 35 |
| A3 | Venezuela | 3 | 8th | Third place (1991) | 52 |
| A4 | Peru | 4 | 7th | Third place (1998) | 66 |
| A5 | Uruguay | 5 | 7th | Third place (2006) | 71 |

== Standings ==
| Pos | Team | Pld | W | D | L | GF | GA | GD | Pts | Qualification |
|---|---|---|---|---|---|---|---|---|---|---|
| 1 | Brazil | 4 | 4 | 0 | 0 | 17 | 0 | +17 | 12 | Advance to semi-finals |
| 2 | Argentina | 4 | 3 | 0 | 1 | 10 | 4 | +6 | 9 | Advance to semi-finals |
| 3 | Venezuela | 4 | 2 | 0 | 2 | 3 | 5 | −2 | 6 | Advance to fifth place match |
| 4 | Uruguay | 4 | 1 | 0 | 3 | 6 | 9 | −3 | 3 | |
| 5 | Peru | 4 | 0 | 0 | 4 | 0 | 18 | −18 | 0 | |

Source: CONMEBOL
Rules for classification: Group stage tiebreakers

== Matches ==
=== Uruguay vs Venezuela ===
9 July 2022
16:00

| Uruguay | 0–1 | Venezuela |
|---|---|---|
| | Report (FIFA); Report (CONMEBOL) | Castellanos 78' |

Estadio Centenario, Armenia
Attendance: 3,000
Referee: María Victoria Daza (Colombia)

| Uruguay | Venezuela |

| GK | 13 | Sofía Olivera |
| DF | 4 | Carina Felipe |
| DF | 2 | Stephanie Lacoste |
| DF | 22 | Sofía Ramondegui | (yellow card) 39' |
| DF | 7 | Stephanie Tregartten |
| MF | 9 | Pamela González (c) | (yellow card) 61' |
| MF | 8 | Ximena Velazco | | (substituted off) 67' |
| MF | 19 | Wendy Carballo |
| MF | 17 | Cecilia Gómez | | (substituted off) 56' |
| MF | 10 | Carolina Birizamberri | | (substituted off) 90+2' |
| FW | 20 | Luciana Gómez | | (substituted off) 56' |
Substitutes:
| GK | 1 | Josefina Villanueva |
| GK | 12 | Vanina Sburlati |
| DF | 3 | Daiana Farías |
| DF | 14 | Pilar González | | (substituted on) 56' |
| DF | 16 | Lorena González |
| MF | 5 | Karol Bermúdez | | (substituted on) 56' |
| MF | 15 | Rocío Martínez |
| MF | 18 | Mariana Pion |
| MF | 23 | Zulma Daer |
| FW | 6 | Sindy Ramírez | | (substituted on) 90+2' |
| FW | 21 | Belén Aquino | | (substituted on) 67' |
Manager:
Ariel Longo

| GK | 13 | Nayluisa Cáceres |
| DF | 3 | Nairelis Gutiérrez |
| DF | 5 | Yenifer Giménez | (yellow card) 87' |
| DF | 2 | Verónica Herrera |
| DF | 6 | Michelle Romero |
| MF | 20 | Dayana Rodríguez | | (substituted off) 76' |
| MF | 16 | Gabriela García | (yellow card) 59' | (substituted off) 61' |
| MF | 7 | Paola Villamizar | (yellow card) 45' | (substituted off) 46' |
| MF | 9 | Deyna Castellanos (c) |
| MF | 18 | Ysaura Viso | | (substituted off) 72' |
| FW | 11 | Oriana Altuve |
Substitutes:
| GK | 1 | Yéssica Velásquez |
| GK | 22 | Andrea Fernanda Tovar |
| DF | 4 | María Peraza |
| DF | 12 | Sabrina Araujo-Elorza |
| DF | 23 | Gabriela Angulo | | (substituted on) 72' |
| MF | 8 | Sonia O'Neill |
| MF | 10 | Kika Moreno | | (substituted on) 61' |
| MF | 14 | Raiderlin Carrasco |
| MF | 15 | Yusmery Ascanio |
| MF | 17 | Maikerlin Astudillo | | (substituted on) 76' |
| MF | 21 | Bárbara Olivieri |
| FW | 19 | Mariana Speckmaier | | (substituted on) 46' |
Manager:
(Italy) Pamela Conti

Player of the match:
Deyna Castellanos (Venezuela)

Assistant referees:
Eliana Ortiz (Colombia)
Nataly Arteaga (Colombia)
Fourth official:
Susana Corella (Ecuador)

=== Brazil vs Argentina ===
9 July 2022
19:00

| Brazil | 4–0 | Argentina |
|---|---|---|
| Adriana 28', 58'; Bia Zaneratto 36' (pen.); Debinha 87' | Report (FIFA); Report (CONMEBOL) |

Estadio Centenario, Armenia
Attendance: 5,000
Referee: María Belén Carvajal (Chile)

| Brazil | Argentina |

| GK | 1 | Lorena |
| DF | 20 | Fe Palermo | | (substituted off) 70' |
| DF | 15 | Tainara | | (substituted off) 70' |
| DF | 4 | Rafaelle (c) |
| DF | 6 | Tamires |
| MF | 11 | Adriana |
| MF | 8 | Angelina | (yellow card) 73' | (substituted off) 80' |
| MF | 17 | Ary Borges | (yellow card) 39' | (substituted off) 70' |
| MF | 21 | Kerolin |
| FW | 19 | Gio Queiroz | | (substituted off) 59' |
| FW | 16 | Bia Zaneratto |
Substitutes:
| GK | 12 | Natascha |
| GK | 22 | Luciana |
| DF | 2 | Letícia Santos | (yellow card) 85' | (substituted on) 70' |
| DF | 3 | Kathellen |
| DF | 13 | Antônia | | (substituted on) 70' |
| MF | 5 | Duda Santos | | (substituted on) 59' |
| MF | 14 | Duda Sampaio | | (substituted on) 70' |
| FW | 7 | Gabi Portilho |
| FW | 9 | Debinha | | (substituted on) 80' |
Manager:
(Sweden) Pia Sundhage

| GK | 1 | Vanina Correa (c) |
| DF | 4 | Julieta Cruz | (yellow card) 40' | (substituted off) 63' |
| DF | 2 | Agustina Barroso |
| DF | 6 | Aldana Cometti |
| DF | 3 | Eliana Stábile |
| MF | 7 | Romina Núñez | (yellow card) 82' |
| MF | 20 | Ruth Bravo | | (substituted off) 63' |
| MF | 8 | Daiana Falfán | | (substituted off) 80' |
| MF | 11 | Yamila Rodríguez | | (substituted off) 70' |
| MF | 15 | Florencia Bonsegundo |
| FW | 19 | Mariana Larroquette | | (substituted off) 80' |
Substitutes:
| GK | 12 | Solana Pereyra |
| GK | 23 | Laurina Oliveros |
| DF | 16 | Marina Delgado | (yellow card) 90+5' | (substituted on) 63' |
| MF | 5 | Vanesa Santana | | (substituted on) 80' |
| MF | 13 | Sophia Braun | | (substituted on) 70' |
| MF | 14 | Miriam Mayorga |
| MF | 17 | Maricel Pereyra |
| MF | 18 | Gabriela Chávez |
| FW | 21 | Érica Lonigro | | (substituted on) 80' |
| FW | 22 | Estefanía Banini | | (substituted on) 63' |
Manager:
Germán Portanova

Player of the match:
Adriana (Brazil)

Assistant referees:
Loreto Toloza (Chile)
Cindy Nahuelcoy (Chile)
Fourth official:
Adriana Farfán (Bolivia)

=== Uruguay vs Brazil ===
12 July 2022
16:00

| Uruguay | 0–3 | Brazil |
|---|---|---|
| | Report (FIFA); Report (CONMEBOL) | Adriana 32', 48'; Debinha 45+2' |

Estadio Centenario, Armenia
Attendance: 1,000
Referee: Zulma Quiñónez (Paraguay)

| Uruguay | Brazil |

| GK | 13 | Sofía Olivera (c) |
| DF | 15 | Rocío Martínez | | (substituted off) 53' |
| DF | 16 | Lorena González |
| DF | 3 | Daiana Farías |
| DF | 7 | Stephanie Tregartten | | (substituted off) 9' |
| DF | 20 | Luciana Gómez |
| MF | 18 | Mariana Pion | | (substituted off) 46' |
| MF | 8 | Ximena Velazco | (yellow card) 65' (yellow-red card) 78' |
| MF | 5 | Karol Bermúdez | | (substituted off) 39' |
| MF | 11 | Esperanza Pizarro | | (substituted off) 53' |
| FW | 10 | Carolina Birizamberri |
Substitutes:
| GK | 1 | Josefina Villanueva |
| GK | 12 | Vanina Sburlati |
| DF | 2 | Stephanie Lacoste |
| DF | 4 | Carina Felipe | | (substituted on) 53' |
| DF | 14 | Pilar González | | (substituted on) 46' |
| DF | 22 | Sofía Ramondegui | | (substituted on) 9' |
| MF | 9 | Pamela González | | (substituted on) 39' |
| MF | 17 | Cecilia Gómez |
| MF | 23 | Zulma Daer |
| FW | 6 | Sindy Ramírez |
| FW | 19 | Wendy Carballo |
| FW | 21 | Belén Aquino | (yellow card) 56' | (substituted on) 53' |
Manager:
Ariel Longo

| GK | 1 | Lorena |
| DF | 13 | Antônia | (yellow card) 37' |
| DF | 15 | Tainara | | (substituted off) 46' |
| DF | 4 | Rafaelle (c) | (yellow card) 81' |
| DF | 6 | Tamires |
| MF | 21 | Kerolin | | (substituted off) 46' |
| MF | 17 | Ary Borges | | (substituted off) 46' |
| MF | 8 | Angelina | | (substituted off) 79' |
| MF | 11 | Adriana |
| FW | 16 | Bia Zaneratto |
| FW | 9 | Debinha | | (substituted off) 58' |
Substitutes:
| GK | 12 | Natascha |
| GK | 22 | Luciana |
| DF | 2 | Letícia Santos |
| DF | 3 | Kathellen | | (substituted on) 46' |
| DF | 20 | Fe Palermo |
| MF | 5 | Duda Santos | | (substituted on) 46' |
| MF | 14 | Duda Sampaio | | (substituted on) 79' |
| MF | 23 | Luana |
| FW | 7 | Gabi Portilho |
| FW | 10 | Duda | (yellow card) 54' | (substituted on) 46' |
| FW | 19 | Gio Queiroz | | (substituted on) 58' |
Manager:
(Sweden) Pia Sundhage

Player of the match:
Adriana (Brazil)

Assistant referees:
Laura Miranda (Paraguay)
Nadia Weiler (Paraguay)
Fourth official:
María Belén Carvajal (Chile)

=== Argentina vs Peru ===
12 July 2022
19:00

| Argentina | 4–0 | Peru |
|---|---|---|
| Rodríguez 18'; Bonsegundo 52'; Stábile 62'; Lonigro 84' | Report (FIFA); Report (CONMEBOL) |

Estadio Centenario, Armenia
Attendance: 2,000
Referee: Susana Corella (Ecuador)

| Argentina | Peru |

| GK | 1 | Vanina Correa (c) |
| DF | 18 | Gabriela Chávez | | (substituted off) 81' |
| DF | 2 | Agustina Barroso |
| DF | 6 | Aldana Cometti | (yellow card) 27' | (substituted off) 72' |
| DF | 3 | Eliana Stábile |
| MF | 11 | Yamila Rodríguez |
| MF | 7 | Romina Núñez | | (substituted off) 63' |
| MF | 8 | Daiana Falfán |
| MF | 15 | Florencia Bonsegundo |
| MF | 22 | Estefanía Banini | | (substituted off) 72' |
| FW | 19 | Mariana Larroquette | | (substituted off) 81' |
Substitutes:
| GK | 12 | Solana Pereyra |
| GK | 23 | Laurina Oliveros |
| DF | 16 | Marina Delgado | | (substituted on) 81' |
| MF | 4 | Julieta Cruz |
| MF | 5 | Vanesa Santana |
| MF | 10 | Dalila Ippólito | | (substituted on) 72' |
| MF | 13 | Sophia Braun |
| MF | 14 | Miriam Mayorga | | (substituted on) 72' |
| MF | 17 | Maricel Pereyra |
| MF | 20 | Ruth Bravo | | (substituted on) 63' |
| FW | 21 | Érica Lonigro | | (substituted on) 81' |
Manager:
Germán Portanova

| GK | 12 | Maryory Sánchez |
| DF | 3 | Grace Cagnina | | (substituted off) 84' |
| DF | 17 | Fabiola Herrera (c) |
| DF | 4 | Braelynn Llamoca |
| MF | 19 | Nahomi Martínez |
| MF | 10 | Sandra Arévalo |
| MF | 8 | Ariana Muñoz | | (substituted off) 83' |
| MF | 14 | Scarleth Flores |
| FW | 11 | Xioczana Canales | (yellow card) 48' | (substituted off) 65' |
| FW | 9 | Alexandra Kimball | | (substituted off) 65' |
| FW | 7 | Sandy Dorador | (yellow card) 33' | (substituted off) 58' |
Substitutes:
| GK | 1 | Silvana Alfaro |
| GK | 21 | Mía Shalit |
| DF | 2 | Stephannie Vásquez |
| DF | 13 | Yoselin Miranda |
| MF | 5 | Teresa Wowk |
| MF | 6 | Claudia Cagnina | | (substituted on) 58' |
| MF | 15 | Emily Flores | | (substituted on) 65' |
| MF | 20 | Claudia Domínguez | | (substituted on) 83' |
| MF | 22 | Cindy Novoa | | (substituted on) 84' |
| FW | 16 | Liliana Neyra |
| FW | 18 | Pierina Núñez | | (substituted on) 65' |
| FW | 23 | Steffani Otiniano |
Manager:
Conrad Flores

Player of the match:
Yamila Rodríguez (Argentina)

Assistant referees:
Viviana Segura (Ecuador)
Andreia Sousa (Portugal)
Fourth official:
Sandra Braz (Portugal)

=== Argentina vs Uruguay ===
15 July 2022
16:00

| Argentina | 5–0 | Uruguay |
|---|---|---|
| Banini 43'; Rodríguez 51', 64', 69'; Stábile 90+5' | Report (FIFA); Report (CONMEBOL) |

Estadio Centenario, Armenia
Attendance: 1,000
Referee: María Victoria Daza (Colombia)

| Argentina | Uruguay |

| GK | 1 | Vanina Correa (c) |
| DF | 16 | Marina Delgado | (yellow card) 82' |
| DF | 2 | Agustina Barroso | (yellow card) 90' |
| DF | 6 | Aldana Cometti | | (substituted off) 77' |
| DF | 3 | Eliana Stábile | (yellow card) 78' |
| MF | 7 | Romina Núñez | | (substituted off) 73' |
| MF | 8 | Daiana Falfán | | (substituted off) 77' |
| MF | 15 | Florencia Bonsegundo | | (substituted off) 62' |
| FW | 11 | Yamila Rodríguez | (yellow card) 33' | (substituted off) 73' |
| FW | 19 | Mariana Larroquette |
| FW | 22 | Estefanía Banini |
Substitutes:
| GK | 12 | Solana Pereyra |
| GK | 23 | Laurina Oliveros |
| MF | 4 | Julieta Cruz |
| MF | 10 | Dalila Ippólito | | (substituted on) 73' |
| MF | 13 | Sophia Braun | | (substituted on) 62' |
| MF | 14 | Miriam Mayorga | | (substituted on) 77' |
| MF | 17 | Maricel Pereyra | | (substituted on) 77' |
| MF | 18 | Gabriela Chávez |
| MF | 20 | Ruth Bravo | | (substituted on) 73' |
| FW | 21 | Érica Lonigro |
Manager:
Germán Portanova

| GK | 13 | Sofía Olivera |
| DF | 15 | Rocío Martínez |
| DF | 2 | Stephanie Lacoste |
| DF | 3 | Daiana Farías | (yellow card) 85' |
| DF | 4 | Carina Felipe | | (substituted off) 66' |
| MF | 9 | Pamela González (c) |
| MF | 20 | Luciana Gómez | (yellow card) 31' | (substituted off) 65' |
| MF | 10 | Carolina Birizamberri | | (substituted off) 46' |
| MF | 17 | Cecilia Gómez | (yellow card) 15' | (substituted off) 46' |
| MF | 6 | Sindy Ramírez | | (substituted off) 46' |
| FW | 11 | Esperanza Pizarro |
Substitutes:
| GK | 1 | Josefina Villanueva |
| GK | 12 | Vanina Sburlati |
| DF | 7 | Stephanie Tregartten |
| DF | 14 | Pilar González | (yellow card) 55' | (substituted on) 46' |
| DF | 16 | Lorena González |
| DF | 22 | Sofía Ramondegui |
| MF | 5 | Karol Bermúdez | | (substituted on) 65' |
| MF | 18 | Mariana Pion | (yellow card) 67' | (substituted on) 66' |
| MF | 23 | Zulma Daer |
| FW | 19 | Wendy Carballo | | (substituted on) 46' |
| FW | 21 | Belén Aquino | | (substituted on) 46' |
Manager:
Ariel Longo

Player of the match:
Yamila Rodríguez (Argentina)

Assistant referees:
Eliana Ortiz (Colombia)
Nataly Arteaga (Colombia)
Fourth official:
Susana Corella (Ecuador)

=== Peru vs Venezuela ===
15 July 2022
19:00

| Peru | 0–2 | Venezuela |
|---|---|---|
| | Report (FIFA); Report (CONMEBOL) | Castellanos 39'; Altuve 64' |

Estadio Centenario, Armenia
Attendance: 5,000
Referee: Sandra Braz (Portugal)

| Peru | Venezuela |

| GK | 12 | Maryory Sánchez |
| DF | 16 | Liliana Neyra | | (substituted off) 82' |
| DF | 17 | Fabiola Herrera (c) | | (substituted off) 73' |
| DF | 4 | Braelynn Llamoca |
| DF | 14 | Scarleth Flores |
| MF | 6 | Claudia Cagnina |
| MF | 10 | Sandra Arévalo | | (substituted off) 66' |
| MF | 19 | Nahomi Martínez |
| MF | 8 | Ariana Muñoz | | (substituted off) 73' |
| MF | 11 | Xioczana Canales | | (substituted off) 46' |
| FW | 9 | Alexandra Kimball |
Substitutes:
| GK | 1 | Silvana Alfaro |
| GK | 21 | Mía Shalit |
| DF | 2 | Stephannie Vásquez | | (substituted on) 73' |
| DF | 3 | Grace Cagnina |
| DF | 13 | Yoselin Miranda |
| MF | 5 | Teresa Wowk |
| MF | 7 | Sandy Dorador | (yellow card) 49' | (substituted on) 46' |
| MF | 15 | Emily Flores | | (substituted on) 73' |
| MF | 20 | Claudia Domínguez | | (substituted on) 82' |
| MF | 22 | Cindy Novoa |
| FW | 18 | Pierina Núñez | | (substituted on) 66' |
| FW | 23 | Steffani Otiniano |
Manager:
Conrad Flores

| GK | 13 | Nayluisa Cáceres |
| DF | 3 | Nairelis Gutiérrez |
| DF | 5 | Yenifer Giménez |
| DF | 4 | María Peraza |
| DF | 6 | Michelle Romero | | (substituted off) 62' |
| MF | 9 | Deyna Castellanos | | (substituted off) 75' |
| MF | 10 | Kika Moreno (c) | | (substituted off) 56' |
| MF | 16 | Gabriela García |
| FW | 7 | Paola Villamizar | | (substituted off) 46' |
| FW | 11 | Oriana Altuve |
| FW | 19 | Mariana Speckmaier | | (substituted off) 46' |
Substitutes:
| GK | 1 | Yéssica Velásquez |
| GK | 22 | Andrea Fernanda Tovar |
| DF | 2 | Verónica Herrera |
| DF | 12 | Sabrina Araujo-Elorza |
| DF | 23 | Gabriela Angulo |
| MF | 8 | Sonia O'Neill |
| MF | 14 | Raiderlin Carrasco | | (substituted on) 46' |
| MF | 15 | Yusmery Ascanio |
| MF | 17 | Maikerlin Astudillo | | (substituted on) 75' |
| MF | 20 | Dayana Rodríguez | (yellow card) 60' | (substituted on) 56' |
| MF | 21 | Bárbara Olivieri | | (substituted on) 62' |
| FW | 18 | Ysaura Viso | | (substituted on) 46' |
Manager:
(Italy) Pamela Conti

Player of the match:
Oriana Altuve (Venezuela)

Assistant referees:
Andreia Sousa (Portugal)
Rita Cabañero Mompó (Spain)
Fourth official:
Zulma Quiñónez (Paraguay)

=== Venezuela vs Brazil ===
18 July 2022
16:00

| Venezuela | 0–4 | Brazil |
|---|---|---|
| | Report (FIFA); Report (CONMEBOL) | Bia Zaneratto 22'; Ary Borges 51'; Debinha 58', 65' |

Estadio Centenario, Armenia
Attendance: 5,000
Referee: Zulma Quiñónez (Paraguay)

| Venezuela | Brazil |

| GK | 13 | Nayluisa Cáceres |
| DF | 3 | Nairelis Gutiérrez | (substituted off) 67' |
| DF | 2 | Verónica Herrera |
| DF | 4 | María Peraza |
| DF | 6 | Michelle Romero |
| MF | 18 | Ysaura Viso | (substituted off) 46' |
| MF | 17 | Maikerlin Astudillo |
| MF | 8 | Sonia O'Neill | (substituted off) 59' |
| MF | 14 | Raiderlin Carrasco |
| MF | 9 | Deyna Castellanos (c) | (substituted off) 68' |
| FW | 11 | Oriana Altuve | (substituted off) 46' |
Substitutes:
| GK | 1 | Yéssica Velásquez |
| GK | 22 | Andrea Fernanda Tovar |
| DF | 5 | Yenifer Giménez |
| DF | 12 | Sabrina Araujo-Elorza | (substituted on) 59' |
| DF | 23 | Gabriela Angulo | (substituted on) 68' |
| MF | 7 | Paola Villamizar | (substituted on) 46' |
| MF | 10 | Kika Moreno |
| MF | 15 | Yusmery Ascanio |
| MF | 16 | Gabriela García |
| MF | 20 | Dayana Rodríguez |
| MF | 21 | Bárbara Olivieri | (substituted on) 67' |
| FW | 19 | Mariana Speckmaier | (substituted on) 46' |
Manager:
(Italy) Pamela Conti

| GK | 1 | Lorena |
| DF | 13 | Antônia |
| DF | 3 | Kathellen | (yellow card) 83' |
| DF | 4 | Rafaelle (c) | (yellow card) 42' | (substituted off) 68' |
| DF | 6 | Tamires |
| MF | 8 | Angelina | (yellow card) 32' |
| MF | 17 | Ary Borges | | (substituted off) 60' |
| MF | 21 | Kerolin | | (substituted off) 46' |
| FW | 11 | Adriana | | (substituted off) 46' |
| FW | 9 | Debinha |
| FW | 16 | Bia Zaneratto | | (substituted off) 60' |
Substitutes:
| GK | 12 | Natascha |
| GK | 22 | Luciana |
| DF | 2 | Letícia Santos |
| DF | 20 | Fe Palermo | | (substituted on) 68' |
| MF | 5 | Duda Santos |
| MF | 14 | Duda Sampaio |
| MF | 23 | Luana | | (substituted on) 60' |
| FW | 7 | Gabi Portilho | | (substituted on) 46' |
| FW | 10 | Duda | | (substituted on) 46' |
| FW | 18 | Geyse | | (substituted on) 60' |
| FW | 19 | Gio Queiroz |
Manager:
(Sweden) Pia Sundhage

Player of the match:
Debinha (Brazil)

Assistant referees:
Laura Miranda (Paraguay)
Nadia Weiler (Paraguay)
Fourth official:
María Victoria Daza (Colombia)

=== Peru vs Uruguay ===
18 July 2022
19:00

| Peru | 0–6 | Uruguay |
|---|---|---|
| | Report (FIFA); Report (CONMEBOL) | Pa. González 51', 76'; Aquino 58'; Pizarro 61', 89'; Velazco 66' |

Estadio Centenario, Armenia
Attendance: 3,500
Referee: Adriana Farfán (Bolivia)

| Peru | Uruguay |

| GK | 12 | Maryory Sánchez |
| DF | 16 | Liliana Neyra | | (substituted off) 35' |
| DF | 3 | Grace Cagnina |
| DF | 4 | Braelynn Llamoca |
| DF | 14 | Scarleth Flores (c) | (yellow card) 44' |
| MF | 6 | Claudia Cagnina |
| MF | 10 | Sandra Arévalo | | (substituted off) 46' |
| MF | 19 | Nahomi Martínez |
| MF | 8 | Ariana Muñoz | | (substituted off) 46' |
| MF | 11 | Xioczana Canales | | (substituted off) 60' |
| FW | 18 | Pierina Núñez |
Substitutes:
| GK | 1 | Silvana Alfaro |
| GK | 21 | Mía Shalit |
| DF | 2 | Stephannie Vásquez |
| DF | 13 | Yoselin Miranda | | (substituted on) 35' |
| MF | 5 | Teresa Wowk |
| MF | 15 | Emily Flores | | (substituted on) 46' |
| MF | 20 | Claudia Domínguez |
| MF | 22 | Cindy Novoa | | (substituted on) 46' |
| FW | 9 | Alexandra Kimball | | (substituted on) 60' |
| FW | 23 | Steffani Otiniano |
Manager:
Conrad Flores

| GK | 1 | Josefina Villanueva | (substituted off) 85' |
| DF | 14 | Pilar González |
| DF | 16 | Lorena González |
| DF | 22 | Sofía Ramondegui | (substituted off) 85' |
| DF | 2 | Stephanie Lacoste | (substituted off) 77' |
| MF | 8 | Ximena Velazco |
| MF | 11 | Esperanza Pizarro |
| MF | 5 | Karol Bermúdez | (substituted off) 77' |
| MF | 9 | Pamela González (c) |
| MF | 21 | Belén Aquino | (substituted off) 77' |
| FW | 19 | Wendy Carballo |
Substitutes:
| GK | 12 | Vanina Sburlati | (substituted on) 85' |
| GK | 13 | Sofía Olivera |
| DF | 3 | Daiana Farías | (substituted on) 85' |
| DF | 7 | Stephanie Tregartten |
| MF | 15 | Rocío Martínez | (substituted on) 77' |
| MF | 17 | Cecilia Gómez |
| MF | 18 | Mariana Pion |
| MF | 20 | Luciana Gómez |
| MF | 23 | Zulma Daer | (substituted on) 77' |
| FW | 6 | Sindy Ramírez |
| FW | 10 | Carolina Birizamberri | (substituted on) 77' |
Manager:
Ariel Longo

Player of the match:
Belén Aquino (Uruguay)

Assistant referees:
Liliana Bejarano (Bolivia)
Inés Choque (Bolivia)
Fourth official:
María Belén Carvajal (Chile)

=== Brazil vs Peru ===
21 July 2022
19:00

| Brazil | 6–0 | Peru |
|---|---|---|
| Duda 1'; Duda Sampaio 17'; Geyse 41'; Duda Santos 44' (pen.); Fe Palermo 48'; Adriana 50' (pen.) | Report (FIFA); Report (CONMEBOL) |

Estadio Pascual Guerrero, Cali
Attendance: 1,500
Referee: Susana Corella (Ecuador)

| Brazil | Peru |

| GK | 1 | Lorena (c) |
| DF | 2 | Letícia Santos | (yellow card) 20' |
| DF | 3 | Kathellen | | (substituted off) 46' |
| DF | 20 | Fe Palermo |
| MF | 23 | Luana | | (substituted off) 90+2' |
| MF | 14 | Duda Sampaio |
| MF | 10 | Duda | | (substituted off) 46' |
| MF | 5 | Duda Santos |
| FW | 7 | Gabi Portilho | | (substituted off) 72' |
| FW | 18 | Geyse | | (substituted off) 60' |
| FW | 21 | Kerolin |
Substitutes:
| GK | 12 | Natascha |
| GK | 22 | Luciana |
| DF | 6 | Tamires | | (substituted on) 72' |
| DF | 13 | Antônia |
| DF | 15 | Tainara | | (substituted on) 46' |
| FW | 9 | Debinha | | (substituted on) 60' |
| FW | 11 | Adriana | | (substituted on) 46' |
| FW | 16 | Bia Zaneratto |
| FW | 17 | Ary Borges | | (substituted on) 90+2' |
| FW | 19 | Gio Queiroz |
Manager:
(Sweden) Pia Sundhage

| GK | 12 | Maryory Sánchez |
| DF | 16 | Liliana Neyra | | (substituted off) 65' |
| DF | 3 | Grace Cagnina |
| DF | 4 | Braelynn Llamoca | (yellow card) 27' |
| DF | 14 | Scarleth Flores (c) |
| MF | 6 | Claudia Cagnina | | (substituted off) 87' |
| MF | 10 | Sandra Arévalo | | (substituted off) 79' |
| MF | 19 | Nahomi Martínez |
| MF | 8 | Ariana Muñoz |
| MF | 11 | Xioczana Canales | | (substituted off) 46' |
| FW | 18 | Pierina Núñez | | (substituted off) 79' |
Substitutes:
| GK | 1 | Silvana Alfaro |
| GK | 21 | Mía Shalit |
| DF | 2 | Stephannie Vásquez | | (substituted on) 46' |
| DF | 13 | Yoselin Miranda | | (substituted on) 65' |
| MF | 5 | Teresa Wowk | | (substituted on) 87' |
| MF | 7 | Sandy Dorador | | (substituted on) 79' |
| MF | 15 | Emily Flores |
| MF | 20 | Claudia Domínguez |
| MF | 22 | Cindy Novoa |
| FW | 9 | Alexandra Kimball | | (substituted on) 79' |
| FW | 23 | Steffani Otiniano |
Manager:
Conrad Flores

Player of the match:
Gabi Portilho (Brazil)

Assistant referees:
Mónica Amboya (Ecuador)
Viviana Segura (Ecuador)
Fourth official:
Zulma Quiñónez (Paraguay)

=== Venezuela vs Argentina ===
21 July 2022
19:00

| Venezuela | 0–1 | Argentina |
|---|---|---|
| | Report (FIFA); Report (CONMEBOL) | Bonsegundo 63' |

Estadio Centenario, Armenia
Attendance: 3,000
Referee: Sandra Braz (Portugal)

| Venezuela | Argentina |

| GK | 13 | Nayluisa Cáceres |
| DF | 3 | Nairelis Gutiérrez | | (substituted off) 46' |
| DF | 5 | Yenifer Giménez | (yellow card) 65' |
| DF | 2 | Verónica Herrera | (yellow card) 52' | (substituted off) 79' |
| DF | 6 | Michelle Romero |
| MF | 18 | Ysaura Viso | | (substituted off) 46' |
| MF | 20 | Dayana Rodríguez | (yellow card) 45' | (substituted off) 74' |
| MF | 16 | Gabriela García | (yellow card) 90' |
| MF | 14 | Raiderlin Carrasco | (yellow card) 90+5' |
| FW | 9 | Deyna Castellanos (c) |
| FW | 11 | Oriana Altuve |
Substitutes:
| GK | 1 | Yéssica Velásquez |
| GK | 22 | Andrea Fernanda Tovar |
| DF | 4 | María Peraza |
| DF | 12 | Sabrina Araujo-Elorza |
| DF | 23 | Gabriela Angulo |
| MF | 7 | Paola Villamizar | | (substituted on) 46' |
| MF | 8 | Sonia O'Neill |
| MF | 10 | Kika Moreno | | (substituted on) 79' |
| MF | 15 | Yusmery Ascanio |
| MF | 17 | Maikerlin Astudillo |
| MF | 21 | Bárbara Olivieri | | (substituted on) 74' |
| FW | 19 | Mariana Speckmaier | | (substituted on) 46' |
Manager:
(Italy) Pamela Conti

| GK | 1 | Vanina Correa (c) | (yellow card) 81' |
| DF | 18 | Gabriela Chávez | | (substituted off) 71' |
| DF | 2 | Agustina Barroso | | (substituted off) 86' |
| DF | 6 | Aldana Cometti |
| DF | 3 | Eliana Stábile |
| MF | 7 | Romina Núñez |
| MF | 8 | Daiana Falfán |
| MF | 15 | Florencia Bonsegundo | (yellow card) 34' | (substituted off) 72' |
| FW | 11 | Yamila Rodríguez | | (substituted off) 84' |
| FW | 19 | Mariana Larroquette | (yellow card) 29' |
| FW | 22 | Estefanía Banini |
Substitutes:
| GK | 12 | Solana Pereyra |
| GK | 23 | Laurina Oliveros |
| MF | 4 | Julieta Cruz | | (substituted on) 71' |
| MF | 5 | Vanesa Santana | | (substituted on) 86' |
| MF | 10 | Dalila Ippólito |
| MF | 13 | Sophia Braun | | (substituted on) 72' |
| MF | 14 | Miriam Mayorga |
| MF | 17 | Maricel Pereyra |
| MF | 20 | Ruth Bravo |
| FW | 9 | Sole Jaimes | | (substituted on) 84' |
| FW | 21 | Érica Lonigro |
Manager:
Germán Portanova

Player of the match:
Florencia Bonsegundo (Argentina)

Assistant referees:
Andreia Sousa (Portugal)
Rita Cabañero Mompó (Spain)
Fourth official:
Adriana Farfán (Bolivia)

== Discipline ==
Fair play points will be used as tiebreakers in the group if the overall and head-to-head records of teams were tied. These are calculated based on yellow and red cards received in all group matches as follows:

- first yellow card: plus 1 point;
- indirect red card (second yellow card): plus 3 points;
- direct red card: plus 4 points;
- yellow card and direct red card: plus 5 points;

| Team | Match 1 | | | | Match 2 | | | | Match 3 | | | | Match 4 | | | | Points |
| Team | Booked | (yellow card) (yellow-red card) | Sent off (straight red) | (yellow card) (red card) | Booked | (yellow card) (yellow-red card) | Sent off (straight red) | (yellow card) (red card) | Booked | (yellow card) (yellow-red card) | Sent off (straight red) | (yellow card) (red card) | Booked | (yellow card) (yellow-red card) | Sent off (straight red) | (yellow card) (red card) | Points |
|---|---|---|---|---|---|---|---|---|---|---|---|---|---|---|---|---|---|
| Brazil | 3 | | | | 3 | | | | 3 | | | | 1 | | | | −10 |
| Argentina | 3 | | | | 1 | | | | 4 | | | | 3 | | | | −11 |
| Venezuela | 3 | | | | 1 | | | | | | | | 5 | | | | −9 |
| Peru | 2 | | | | 1 | | | | 1 | | | | 1 | | | | −5 |
| Uruguay | 2 | | | | 1 | 1 | | | 5 | | | | | | | | −11 |
