= Andrea Tovar =

Andrea Tovar may refer to:

- Andrea Tovar (beauty pageant titleholder), Miss Colombia 2015
- Andrea Fernanda Tovar (born 1990), Venezuelan footballer
