= Antonio Spinelli =

Antonio Spinelli may refer to:

- Antonio Spinelli (bishop)
- Antonio Spinelli (football manager)
