= Lorena González =

Lorena González or Gonzalez may refer to:

- Lorena Gonzalez (California politician), California state representative
- Lorena González (Seattle politician), Seattle city council member
- Lorena González (footballer), Uruguayan footballer
