= Guilherme Giudice =

Brazilian football manager (born 1983)

Personal information
- Full name: Guilherme Giudice
- Date of birth: 26 September 1983 (age 43)
- Place of birth: São José dos Campos, Brazil

Team information
- Current team: Brazil U20 (women) (assistant)

Managerial career
- Years: Team
- 2008–2016: São José-SP (youth)
- 2016–2017: Brazil (women) (assistant)
- 2008–2019: Santos (women) (assistant)
- 2019–2020: Santos (women)
- 2021–2022: São José (women)
- 2023: Fortaleza (women)
- 2024–2025: Santos (women) (assistant)
- 2025–: Brazil U20 (women) (assistant)

Guilherme Giudice (born 26 September 1983) is a Brazilian football coach. He is the current assistant coach of Brazil women's national under-20 team.

== Career ==
Born in São José dos Campos, São Paulo, Giudice worked as a youth manager at hometown side São José before joining Emily Lima's staff at the Brazil women's national team in 2016. He followed Emily to Santos' women's team, being her assistant until September 2019, when he was appointed manager after Emily was sacked.

In 2020, Giudice had to take a leave of absence for some matches after being diagnosed with four cancers in four different areas. After chemotherapy sessions amidst the COVID-19 pandemic, he was cured from all four cancers and returned to his managerial activities, and subsequently won the 2020 Copa Paulista de Futebol Feminino with Santos.

On 22 January 2021, Giudice was sacked by Santos. On 5 October, he was appointed at the helm of the women's team of São José.

== Honours ==
Santos

- Copa Paulista de Futebol Feminino: 2020
