= Yamila Rodríguez =

Argentine footballer (born 1998)

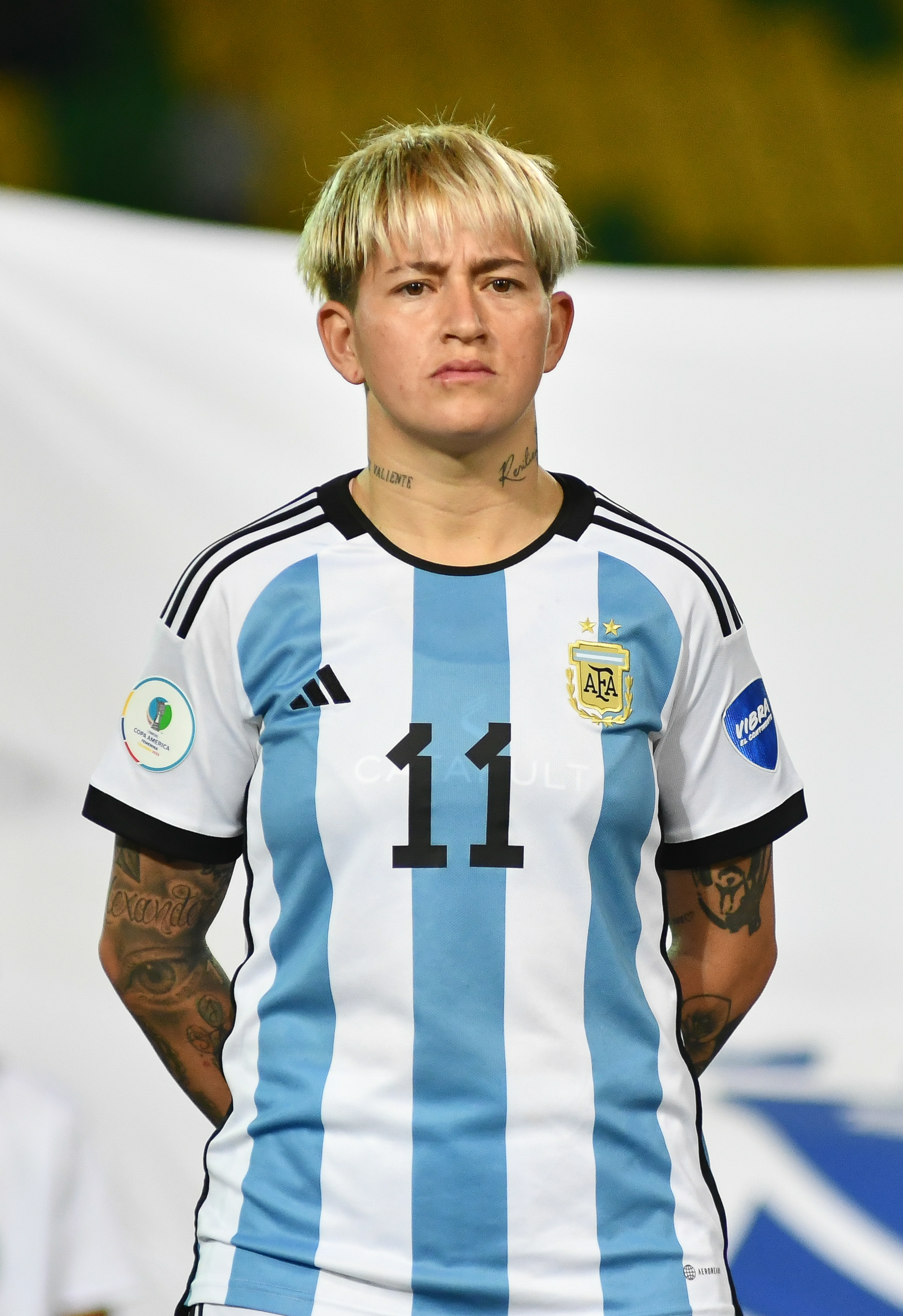
- Rodríguez with Argentina at the 2022 Copa América Femenina

Personal information
- Full name: Yamila Tamara Rodríguez
- Date of birth: 24 January 1998 (age 28)
- Place of birth: Posadas, Argentina
- Height: 1.60 m (5 ft 3 in)
- Position: Forward

Team information
- Current team: Grêmio

Youth career
- Huracán de Posadas

Senior career*
Years	Team	Apps	(Gls)
2016–2018	Boca Juniors		
2018	Santa Teresa	8	(1)
2018–2022	Boca Juniors		
2023–2024	Palmeiras	25	(3)
2024	Santos	0	(0)
2025–	Grêmio	0	(0)

International career^{‡}
2015	Argentina U20	?	(6)
2018–	Argentina	64	(14)
Medal record
Women's football
Representing Argentina
Copa América Femenina
Third place	2018 Chile
Third place	2022 Colombia
Third place	2025 Ecuador
Pan American Games
Silver medal – second place	2019 Lima	Team
- * Club domestic league appearances and goals as of 1 September 2024 ‡ National team caps and goals as of 29 October 2025

Yamila Tamara Rodríguez (born 24 January 1998) is an Argentine professional footballer who plays as a forward for Brazilian Série A1 club Grêmio and the Argentina women's national team.

== Club career ==
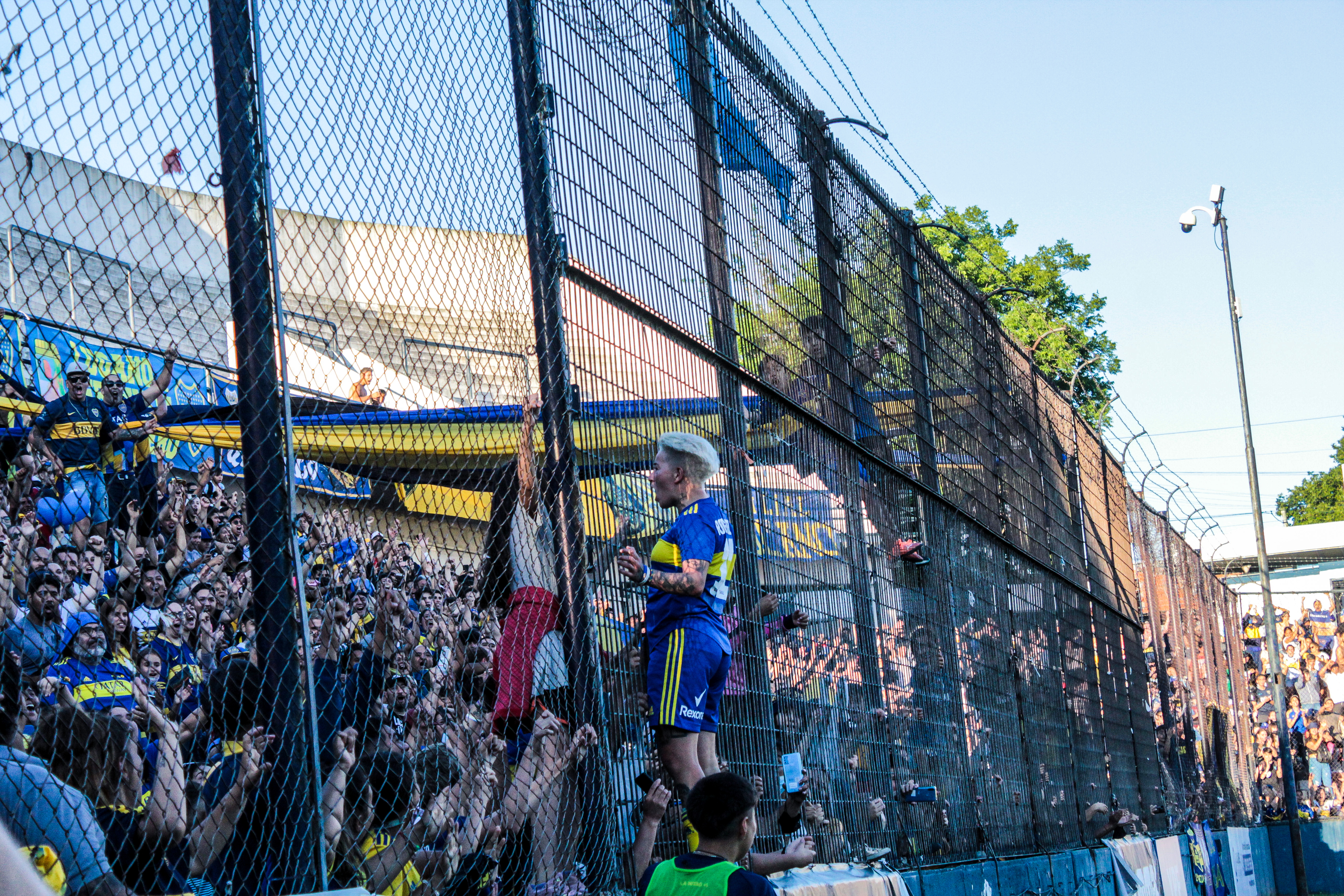
Rodríguez (centre) celebrating a goal while playing for Boca Juniors in 2021

Rodríguez began her career with Boca Juniors. In February 2018, she moved to Spanish club Santa Teresa, but returned to Boca in the following year.

On 9 March 2019, Rodríguez scored the first official goal of Boca Juniors women's team playing in La Bombonera. In August, she and another 17 players of the club signed their first professional contracts.

On 2 January 2023, Rodríguez joined Brazilian club Palmeiras. On 11 September 2024, she rescinded her contract with the club, and agreed to a short-term deal with Santos just hours later.

== International career ==
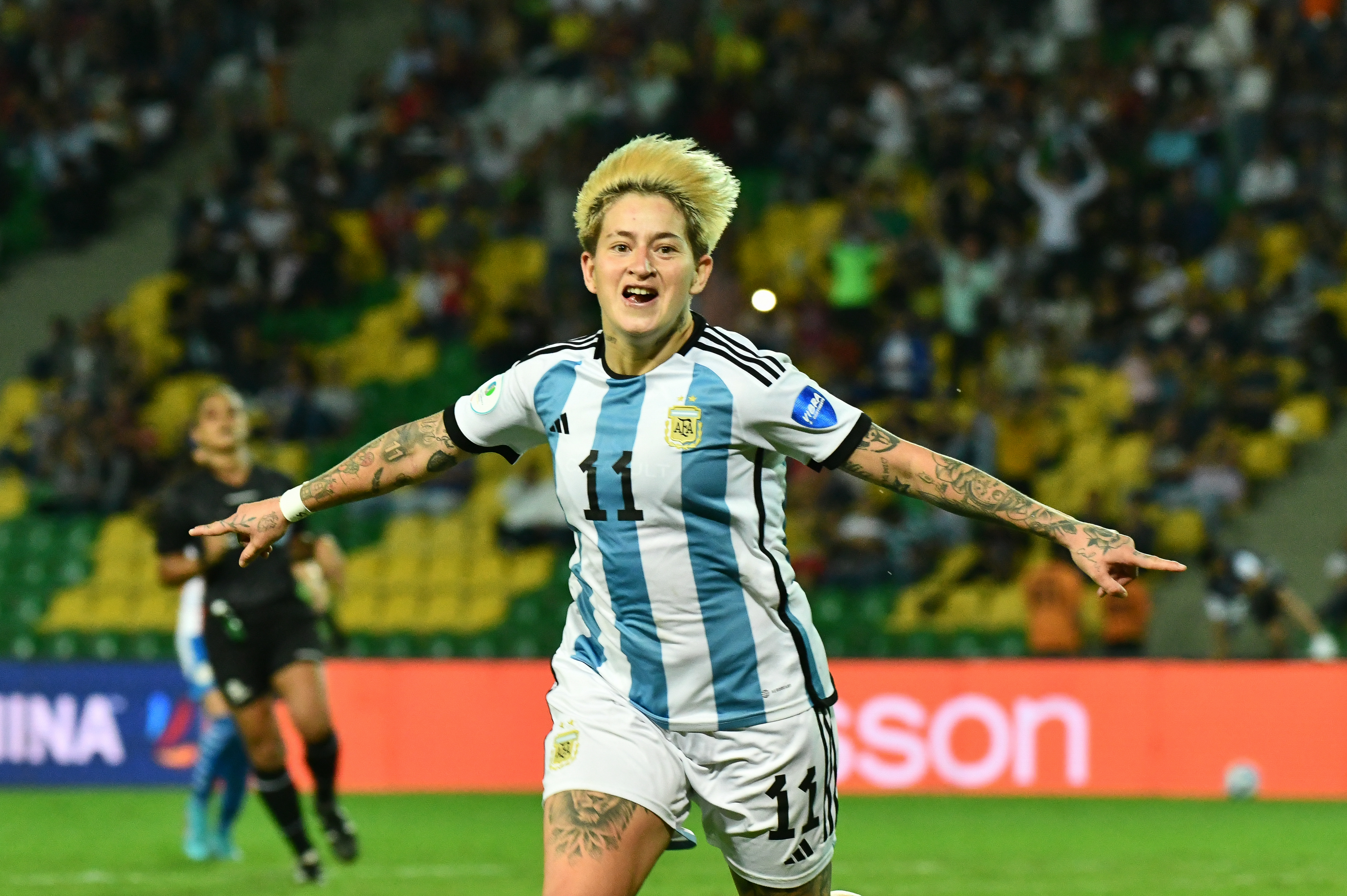
Rodríguez playing for Argentina at the 2022 Copa América Femenina

Rodríguez represented Argentina at the 2015 South American U-20 Women's Championship. She made her debut with the full side on 7 April 2018, replacing Ruth Bravo in a 3–0 win over Bolivia for the 2018 Copa América Femenina.

Rodríguez scored her first international goal on 10 April 2022, netting the winner in a 1–0 home success over Chile. In August, she was called up to the 2022 Copa América Femenina, and was the top scorer of the tournament with six goals, the first Argentine to do so since Marisol Medina in 2003.

In July 2023, Rodríguez was included in Germán Portanova's 23-women squad for the 2023 FIFA Women's World Cup.

== Career statistics ==
=== International ===
As of match played 28 October 2025

Appearances and goals by national team and year
National team	Year	Apps	Goals
Argentina	2018	7	1
Argentina	2019	9	0
Argentina	2021	7	0
Argentina	2022	9	7
Argentina	2023	8	2
Argentina	2024	10	1
Argentina	2025	14	3
Total		64	14

=== International goals ===
Scores and results list Argentina's goals tally first

No.	Date	Venue	Opponent	Score	Result	Competition
1.	8 November 2018	Estadio Julio Humberto Grondona, Sarandí, Argentina	Panama	4–0	4–0	2019 FIFA Women's World Cup qualification
2.	10 April 2022	Estadio Provincial Juan Gilberto Funes, San Luis, Argentina	Chile	1–0	1–0	Friendly
3.	12 July 2022	Estadio Centenario, Armenia, Colombia	Peru	1–0	4–0	2022 Copa América Femenina
4.	15 July 2022	Estadio Centenario, Armenia, Colombia	Uruguay	2–0	5–0	2022 Copa América Femenina
5.	15 July 2022	Estadio Centenario, Armenia, Colombia	Uruguay	3–0	5–0	2022 Copa América Femenina
6.	15 July 2022	Estadio Centenario, Armenia, Colombia	Uruguay	4–0	5–0	2022 Copa América Femenina
7.	29 July 2022	Estadio Centenario, Armenia, Colombia	Paraguay	1–1	3–1	2022 Copa América Femenina
8.	29 July 2022	Estadio Centenario, Armenia, Colombia	Paraguay	3–1	3–1	2022 Copa América Femenina
9.	17 February 2023	North Harbour Stadium, Auckland, New Zealand	Chile	3–0	4–0	Friendly
10.	14 July 2023	Estadio Único de San Nicolás, San Nicolás de los Arroyos, Argentina	Peru	3–0	4–0	Friendly
11.	3 June 2024	Estadio Ciudad de Vicente López, Florida, Argentina	Costa Rica	2–0	2–0	Friendly
12.	22 February 2025	Estadio Bicentenario de La Florida, Santiago, Chile	Chile	2–0	3–0	Friendly
13.	8 April 2025	Starlight Stadium, Langford, Canada	Canada	1–0	1–0	Friendly
14.	21 July 2025	Estadio Banco Guayaquil, Quito, Ecuador	Peru	1–0	1–0	2025 Copa América Femenina

== Personal life ==
Rodríguez is openly lesbian.

== Honours ==
Boca Juniors

- Primera División A: 2020, 2021 Clausura, 2022
- Súper Final: 2021

Santos

- Copa Paulista de Futebol Feminino: 2024

Individual

- South American U-20 Women's Championship top scorer: 2015
- Artilheira da Copa América: 2022
- Copa América Femenina Best XI: 2022
- IFFHS Women's CONMEBOL team: 2022
