= Sofie Bredgaard =

Danish footballer (born 2002)

Personal information
- Full name: Sofie Bruun Bredgaard
- Date of birth: 18 January 2002 (age 24)
- Place of birth: Frederiksværk, Denmark
- Height: 1.63 m (5 ft 4 in)
- Positions: Midfielder; forward

Team information
- Current team: Fiorentina
- Number: 15

Youth career
- Frederiksværk FC
- Melby-Liseleje IF
- Hillerød Fodbold
- BSF
- 2017–2018: B.93

Senior career*
Years	Team	Apps	(Gls)
2018–2019	B.93	7	(1)
2020–2022	Linköpings FC	32	(2)
2022–2024	FC Rosengård	54	(15)
2024–	Fiorentina	29	(4)

International career^{‡}
2017–2018	Denmark U16	13	(5)
2017–2019	Denmark U17	15	(1)
2019–2020	Denmark U19	6	(1)
2022–	Denmark	24	(3)
- * Club domestic league appearances and goals as of 03:46, 20 December 2025 (UTC) ‡ National team caps and goals as of 23:00, 18 April 2026 (UTC)

Sofie Bruun Bredgaard (born 18 January 2002) is a Danish footballer who plays as a forward for Fiorentina and the Denmark national team.

== Club career ==
Bredgaard joined B.93 from BSF in 2017. The following year she scored for B.93 on her Kvindeligaen debut, in a 2–2 draw with Odense Q at Østerbro Stadium. In October 2017 she had spent a period training with Manchester City.

In July 2020 Bredgaard signed a two-and-a-half-year contract with Swedish Damallsvenskan club Linköpings FC. She regretted leaving home before the completion of her education, but noted that the pay and conditions for female footballers were much better in Sweden than Denmark. After playing in Linköpings' first match of the 2022 Damallsvenskan season, Bredgaard signed for FC Rosengård on 31 March 2022, the final day of the transfer window.

== International career ==
Bredgaard won her first cap for the Denmark national team on 12 April 2022, in a 2–0 2023 FIFA World Cup qualification – UEFA Group E win over Azerbaijan at Viborg Stadium. She entered play as a 77th-minute substitute for Sofie Svava.

== International goals ==
No.	Date	Venue	Opponent	Score	Result	Competition
1.	21 February 2023	Stade Francis Le Basser, Laval, France	Uruguay	1–0	3–2	2023 Tournoi de France
2.	31 October 2023	Viborg Stadium, Viborg, Denmark	Wales	1–2	1–2	2023–24 UEFA Women's Nations League
3.	3 March 2026	Forum Horsens Stadium, Horsens, Denmark	Serbia	1–0	3–1	2027 FIFA Women's World Cup qualification

== Honours ==
FC Rosengård

- Damallsvenskan: 2022, 2024
- Svenska Cupen: 2021–22
