= Naomie Feller =

French footballer (born 2001)

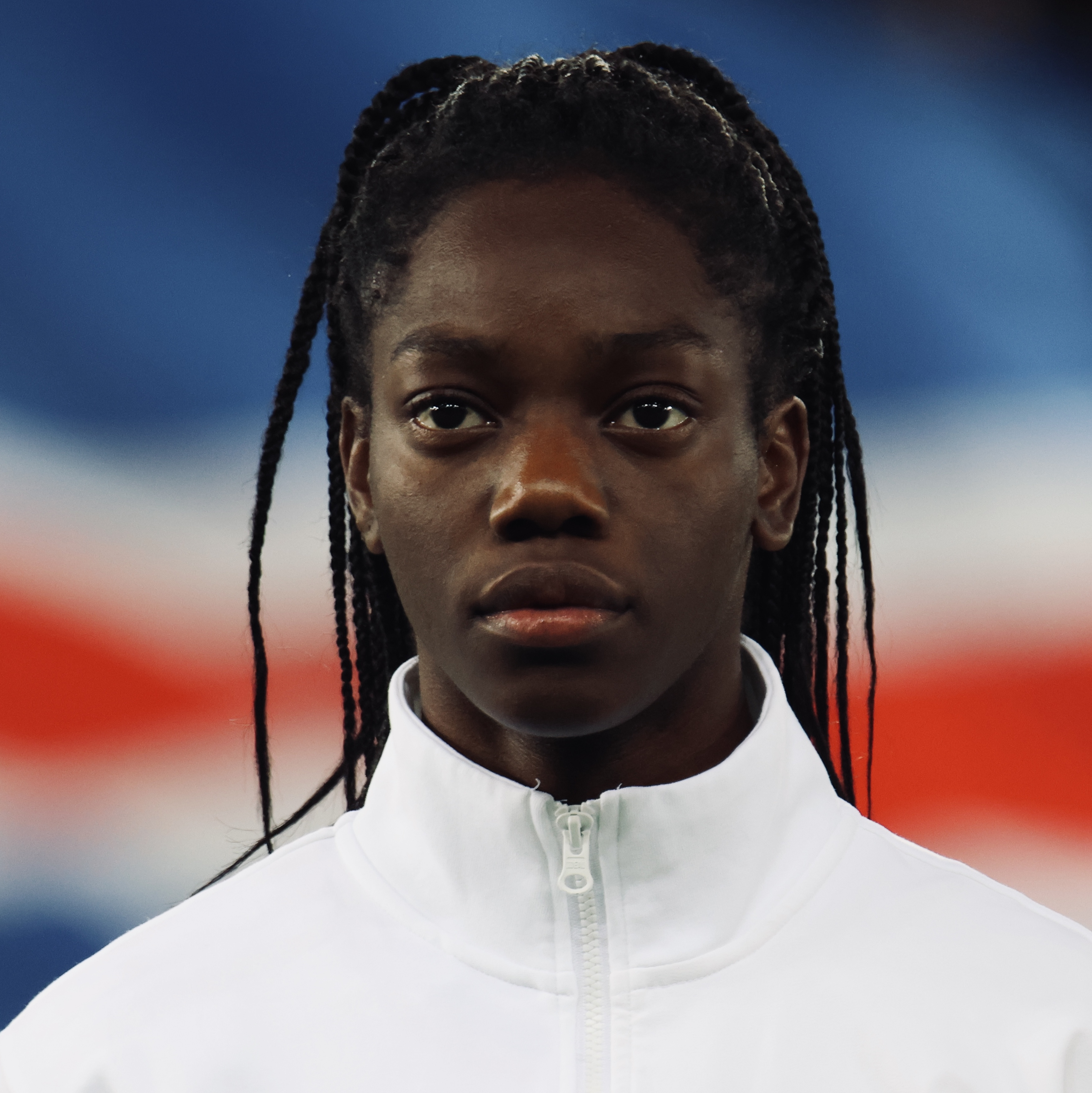
- Feller with Real Madrid in 2023

Personal information
- Full name: Naomie Noëlle Feller
- Date of birth: 6 November 2001 (age 25)
- Place of birth: Paris, France
- Height: 1.70 m (5 ft 7 in)
- Position: Forward

Team information
- Current team: Paris Saint-Germain
- Number: 18

Youth career
- 2010–2011: Saint-Brice
- 2011–2015: AFC Creil
- 2015–2017: US Chantilly

Senior career*
Years	Team	Apps	(Gls)
2017–2018	VGA Saint-Maur	14	(3)
2018–2022	Reims	37	(9)
2020	→ Lyon (loan)	2	(1)
2022–2026	Real Madrid	88	(19)
2026–	Paris Saint-Germain	6	(1)

International career^{‡}
2017	France U16	3	(0)
2018	France U17	3	(1)
2019–2020	France U19	12	(5)
2019	France U20	1	(0)
2022–2025	France U23	12	(7)
2021–	France	9	(1)
Medal record
Women's football
Representing France
UEFA Women's Nations League
Third place	2025
UEFA Women's Under-19 Championship
Winner	2019 Scotland
- * Club domestic league appearances and goals as of 21 November 2026 ‡ National team caps and goals as of 14 April 2026

Naomie Noëlle Feller (born 6 November 2001) is a French professional footballer who plays as a forward for Première Ligue club Paris Saint-Germain and the France national team.

== Club career ==
Feller scored on her league debut for Lyon against Marseille on 8 February 2020, scoring in the 67th minute.

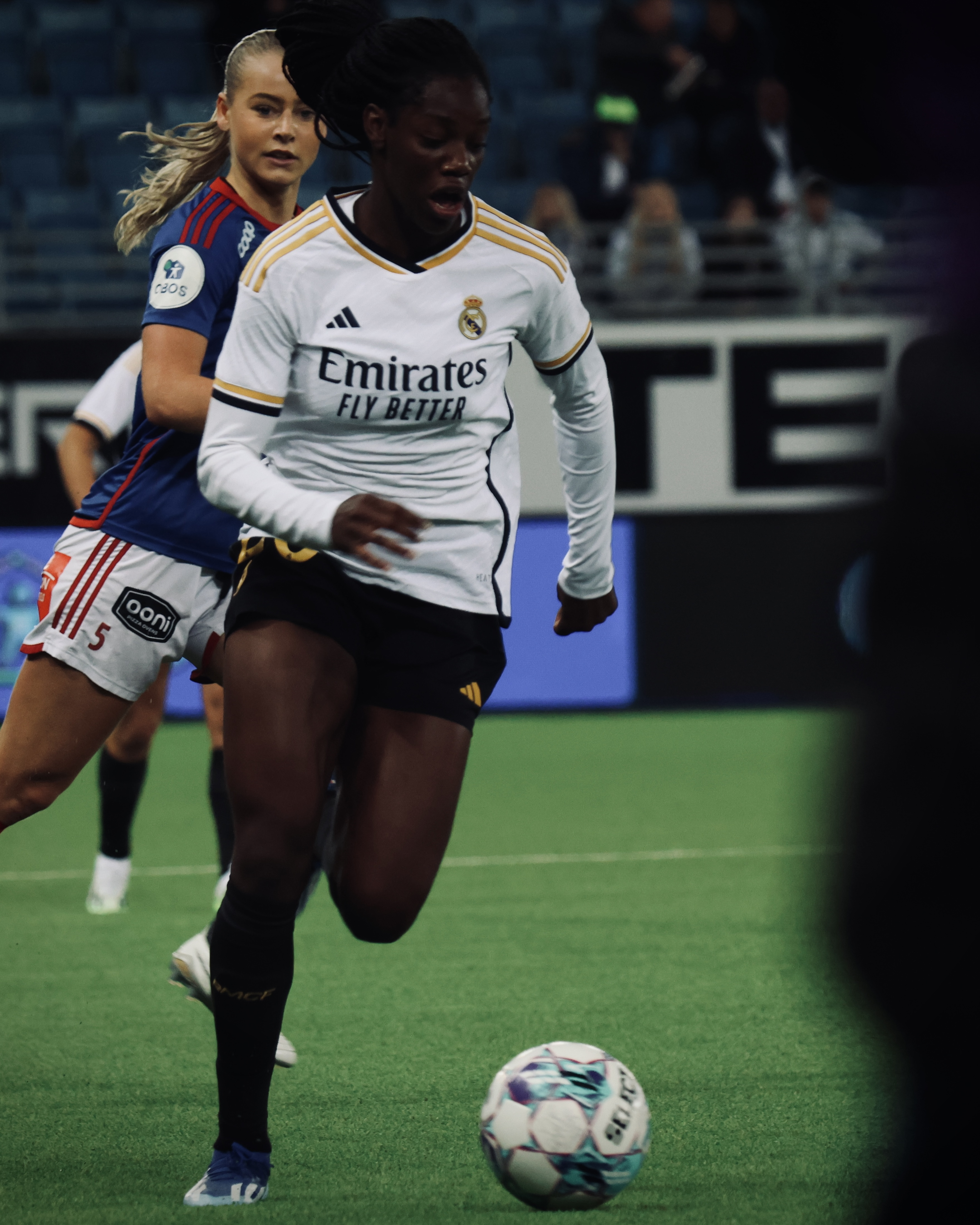
Feller with Real Madrid in 2023

On 10 July 2022, Feller joined Primera División club Real Madrid. She made her league debut against Sevilla on 2 October 2022. Feller scored her first league goals, a brace against Alhama, scoring in the 32nd and 35th minute. During her first season with Real Madrid, Feller struggled with injuries. Feller was named Mahou Five Star Player for March in April 2024. On 30 May 2024, Feller's contract was extended until 30 June 2026. She left the club by the end of the 2025–26 season.

On 6 July 2026, Feller was announced at Première Ligue club Paris Saint-Germain on a four-year contract.

== International career ==
Feller is a former French youth international. She was part of the French squad which won 2019 UEFA Women's Under-19 Championship. She made her senior team debut on 22 October 2021 in a 11–0 FIFA World Cup qualifier win against Estonia. Feller scored her first international goal against Uruguay on 18 February 2023, scoring in the 79th minute.

Feller was part of the France squad that won the 2023 Tournoi de France.

Feller was named in the 26-player preliminary squad for the 2023 FIFA Women's World Cup on 6 June 2023. She was named in the final 23-player squad announced on 4 July 2023.

On 22 October 2024, Feller was replaced by Vicki Bècho due to Feller's injury.

== Career statistics ==
=== International ===
As of match played 14 April 2026

Appearances and goals by national team and year
National team	Year	Apps	Goals
France	2021	1	0
France	2023	5	1
France	2024	1	0
France	2025	1	0
France	2026	1	0
Total		9	1

Scores and results list France's goal tally first, score column indicates score after each Feller goal.

List of international goals scored by Naomie Feller
No.	Date	Venue	Opponent	Score	Result	Competition
1	18 February 2023	Stade Raymond Kopa, Angers, France	Uruguay	5–1	5–1	2023 Tournoi de France

== Honours ==
Reims

- Division 2 Féminine: 2018–19

Lyon

- Division 1 Féminine: 2019–20
- Coupe de France Féminine: 2019–20
- UEFA Women's Champions League: 2019–20

France U19

- UEFA Women's Under-19 Championship: 2019
