= 2023 Tournoi de France =

2023 edition of the Pinatar Cup

Tournament details
- Host country: France
- Dates: 15–21 February
- Teams: 4 (from 2 confederations)
- Venue: 2 (in 2 host cities)

Final positions
- Champions: France (3rd title)
- Runners-up: Denmark
- Third place: Norway
- Fourth place: Uruguay

Tournament statistics
- Matches played: 6
- Goals scored: 15 (2.5 per match)
- Top scorer(s): 15 players (1 goal each)

The 2023 Tournoi de France was the third and last edition of the Tournoi de France, an international women's football tournament. It was held in Laval and Angers, France between 15 and 21 February 2023.

France won the title for the third time.

== Format ==
The four invited teams played a round-robin tournament. Points awarded in the group stage followed the formula of three points for a win, one point for a draw, and zero points for a loss. A tie in points was decided by goal differential.

== Teams ==
Team	FIFA Rankings (December 2022)
France	5
Norway	13
Denmark	18
Uruguay	67

== Standings ==
Pos	Team	Pld	W	D	L	GF	GA	GD	Pts
1	France (H, C)	3	2	1	0	6	1	+5	7
2	Denmark	3	2	0	1	5	3	+2	6
3	Norway	3	1	1	1	1	2	−1	4
4	Uruguay	3	0	0	3	3	9	−6	0

Source: Soccerway
Rules for classification: 1) points; 2) goal difference; 3) goals scored; 4) head-to-head points; 5) head-to-head goal difference; 6) head-to-head number of goals scored; 7) FIFA ranking.
(C) Champions; (H) Hosts

== Results ==
All times are local (UTC+2).

15 February 2023
18:00

Norway	1–0	Uruguay
Sævik 29'	Report

Stade Raymond Kopa, Angers
Referee: Audrey Gerbel (France)
15 February 2023
21:10

France	1–0	Denmark
Bilbault 31'	Report

Stade Francis Le Basser, Laval
Attendance: 7,409
Referee: Monika Mularczyk (Poland)

18 February 2023
18:00

Denmark	2–0	Norway
Hasbo 9'; Svava 83'	Report

Stade Francis Le Basser, Laval
Referee: Victoria Beyer (France)
18 February 2023
21:10

France	5–1	Uruguay
Bussy 26'; Dali 34'; Renard 43'; Toletti 71'; Feller 79'	Report	L. Gómez 32'

Stade Raymond Kopa, Angers
Attendance: 9,070
Referee: Lorraine Watson (Scotland)

21 February 2023
18:00

Denmark	3–2	Uruguay
Bredgaard 8'; Sevecke 89'; Thomsen 90'	Report	Correa 16'; Aquino 84'

Stade Francis Le Basser, Laval
Referee: Alexandra Collin (France)
21 February 2023
21:10

France	0–0	Norway
	Report

Stade Raymond Kopa, Angers
Attendance: 11,445
Referee: Ivana Projkovska (North Macedonia)

== Goalscorers ==
There were 15 goals scored in 6 matches, for an average of 2.5 goals per match.

1 goal

- (Denmark) Sofie Bredgaard
- (Denmark) Josefine Hasbo
- (Denmark) Rikke Sevecke
- (Denmark) Sofie Svava
- (Denmark) Janni Thomsen
- (France) Charlotte Bilbault
- (France) Kessya Bussy
- (France) Kenza Dali
- (France) Naomie Feller
- (France) Wendie Renard
- (France) Sandie Toletti
- (Norway) Karina Sævik
- (Uruguay) Belén Aquino
- (Uruguay) Yannel Correa
- (Uruguay) Luciana Gómez
