= Club Nacional de Football (women) =

Uruguayan football club

Nacional
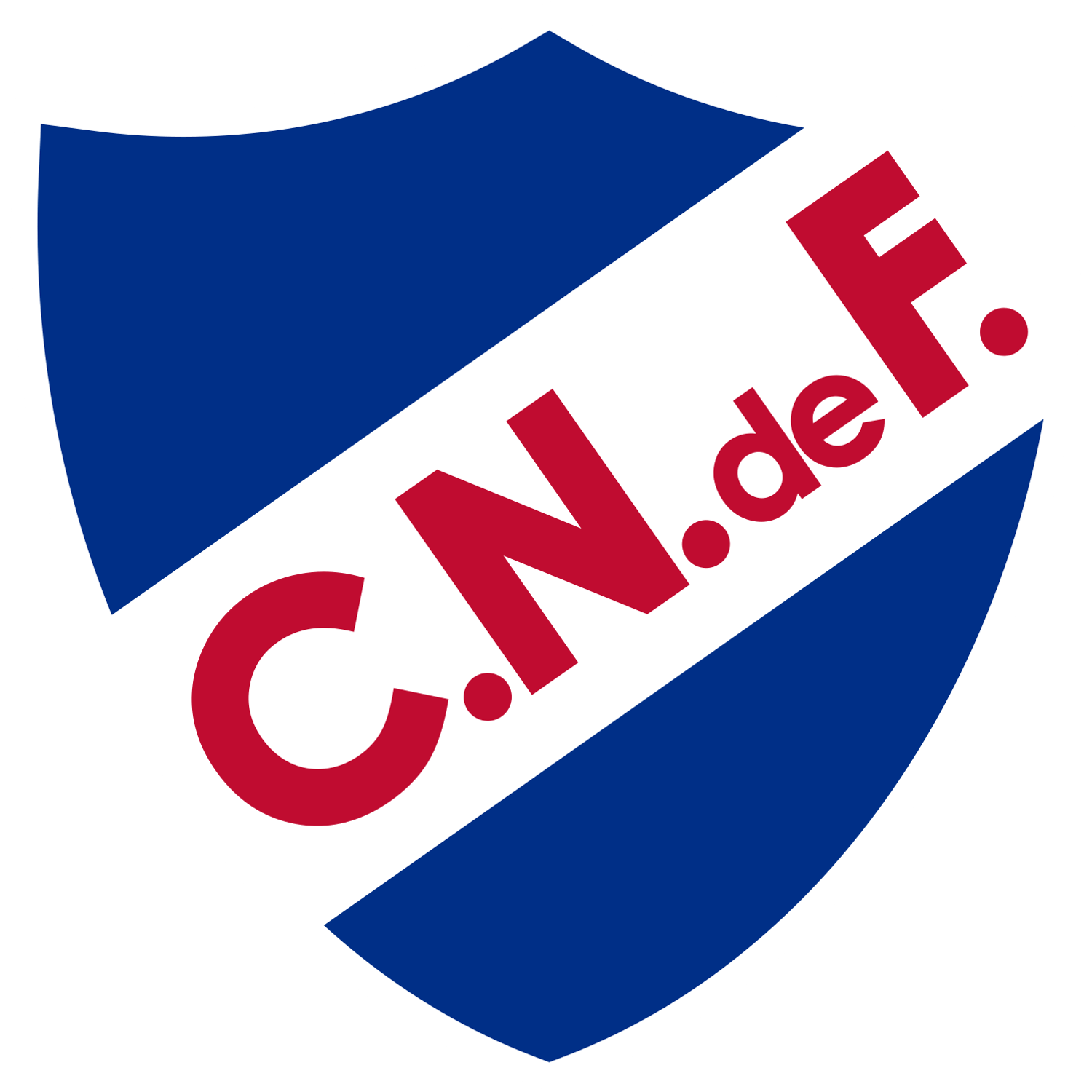
- Full name: Club Nacional de Football
- Nicknames: Bolso, Tricolores (Tricolors), Bolsilludas, Albas (Whites)
- Founded: 14 May 1899; 127 years ago
- Ground: Estadio Gran Parque Central
- Capacity: 26,500
- Chairman: (Uruguay) Eduardo Ache
- Manager: (Uruguay) Dardo Perez
- League: Women First Division
- 2025: 1st
- Website: https://www.nacional.uy/futbol/futbol-femenino/noticias.html
Home colours	Away colours	Third colours

The Women's Club Nacional de Football is a club from Montevideo representing the Club Nacional de Football in the Uruguayan championship of women's football since the first edition organized in 1997, where the Club Nacional de Football obtained the first title.

== Current squad ==
Note: Flags indicate national team as defined under FIFA eligibility rules; some limited exceptions apply. Players may hold more than one non-FIFA nationality.

No.	Pos.	Nation	Player
—	GK	URU	Agustina Sánchez
—	GK	URU	Josefina Villanueva
—	DF	URU	Antonella Ferradans
—	DF	URU	Valeria Colman
—	DF	URU	Romina Soravilla
—	DF	URU	Maytel Costa
—	DF	URU	Fátima Barone
—	MF	URU	Daniela Olivera
—	MF	URU	Cecilia Gómez
—	MF	URU	Naiara Ferrari
—	MF	URU	Sabrina Soravilla
—	MF	URU	Hevelin Jara
—	MF	URU	Ángela Gómez

No.	Pos.	Nation	Player
—	MF	URU	Lucía Cappelletti
—	MF	URU	Micaela Domínguez
—	MF	URU	Caterin Lima
—	MF	URU	Juliana Viera
—	MF	URU	Melisa Acevedo
—	MF	URU	Karol Bermúdez
—	MF	URU	Luciana Gómez
—	MF	URU	Solange Lemos
—	FW	URU	Sofía Ferrada
—	FW	URU	Esperanza Pizarro
—	FW	URU	Luciana Perera
—	FW	URU	Yamila Badell
—	FW	URU	Valentina Morales

== Honours ==
- Campeonato Uruguayo (8): 1997, 2000, 2010, 2011, 2020, 2022, 2024, 2025
