= Steffani Otiniano =

Peruvian footballer (born 1992)

Personal information
- Full name: Steffani Ethel Otiniano Torres
- Date of birth: 7 August 1992 (age 34)
- Place of birth: Iquitos, Peru
- Height: 1.58 m (5 ft 2 in)
- Positions: Right winger; right midfielder

Team information
- Current team: Minas ICESP

Senior career*
Years	Team	Apps	(Gls)
2014–2015	Portuguesa	1	(0)
2016–2017	Taubaté		
2018	Embu das Artes	5	(0)
2019	São Francisco		
2019	Universitario		
2020	Universitario	1	(0)
2020–	Minas Brasilia	12	(0)

International career^{‡}
2019–	Peru	3	(2)
- * Club domestic league appearances and goals as of 24 June 2021 ‡ National team caps and goals as of 3 August 2019

Steffani Ethel Otiniano Torres (born 7 August 1992) is a Peruvian professional footballer who plays as a forward for Brazilian Série A1 club AS Minas ICESP and the Peru women's national team.

== International goals ==
Scores and results list Peru's goal tally first

No.	Date	Venue	Opponent	Score	Result	Competition
1	31 July 2019	Estadio Universidad San Marcos, Lima, Peru	Costa Rica	1–0	1–3	2019 Pan American Games
2	3 August 2019	Estadio Universidad San Marcos, Lima, Peru	Panama	1–1	1–1	2019 Pan American Games
