= Solana Pereyra =

Argentine footballer (born 1999)

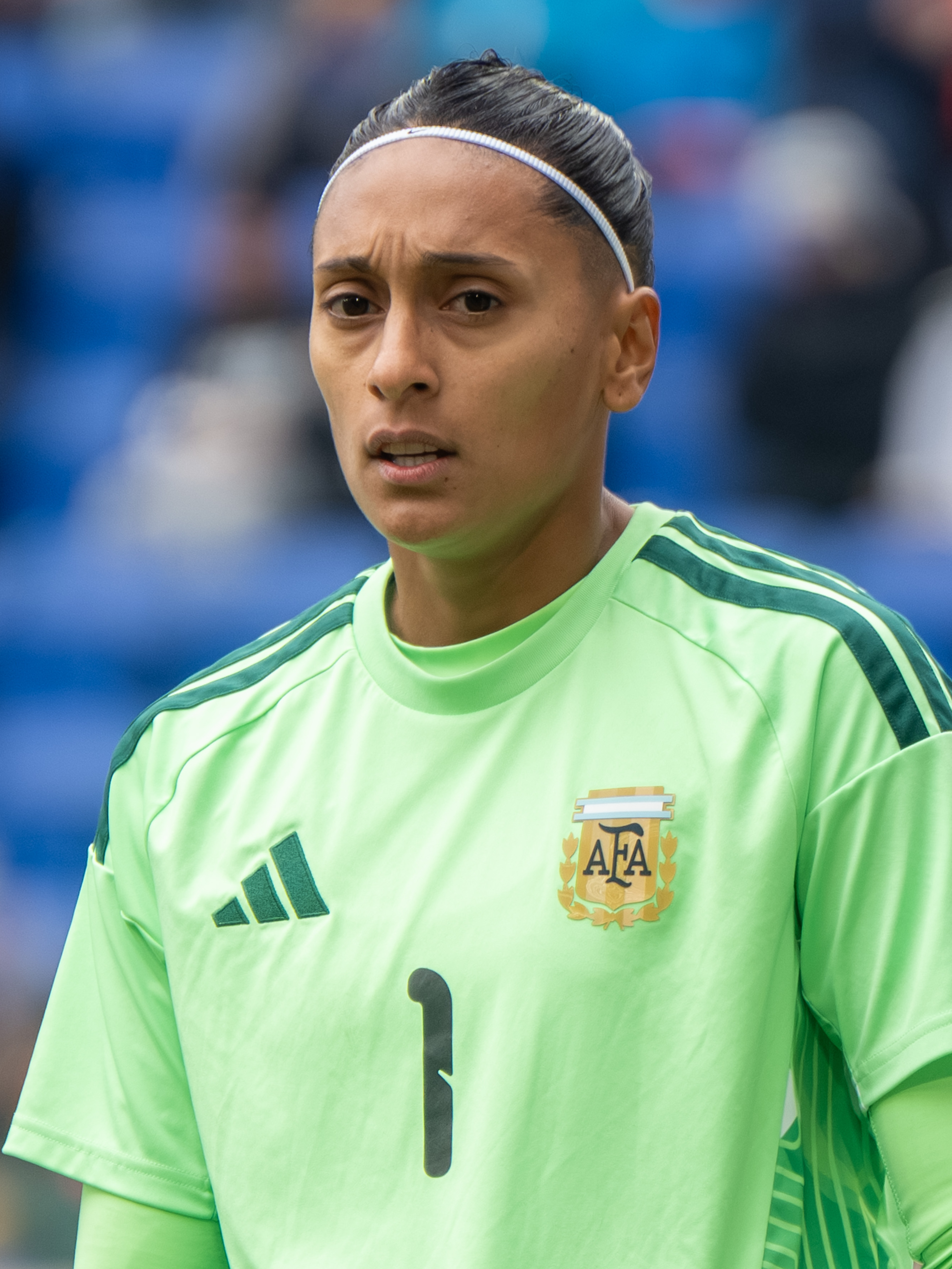
- Pereyra in 2026

Personal information
- Full name: Solana Gabriela Pereyra
- Date of birth: 5 April 1999 (age 27)
- Place of birth: San Miguel, Tucumán, Argentina
- Height: 1.75 m (5 ft 9 in)
- Position: Goalkeeper

Team information
- Current team: San Lorenzo
- Number: 1

Senior career*
Years	Team	Apps	(Gls)
201?–2020	UAI Urquiza		
2020–?	Real Unión Tenerife	48	(0)
2023–	San Lorenzo		

International career^{‡}
2019–	Argentina	31	(0)
Medal record
Women's football
Representing Argentina
Copa América Femenina
Bronze medal – third place	2025 Ecuador
Pan American Games
Silver medal – second place	2019 Lima	Team
- * Club domestic league appearances and goals as of 22 May 2022 ‡ National team caps and goals as of 18 April 2026

Solana Gabriela Pereyra (born 5 April 1999) is an Argentine footballer who plays as a goalkeeper for San Lorenzo and the Argentina women's national team.

== International career ==
Pereyra made her senior debut for Argentina on 23 May 2019, in a 3–1 victory against Uruguay.

== Career statistics ==
=== International ===
As of match played 14 April 2026

Appearances and goals by national team and year
National team	Year	Apps	Goals
Argentina	2019	6	0
Argentina	2021	3	0
Argentina	2022	1	0
Argentina	2024	4	0
Argentina	2025	13	0
Argentina	2026	4	0
Total		31	0

== Honours ==
UAI Urquiza

- Primera División A: 2018–19
- Copa Federal: 2021

San Lorenzo

- Primera División A: 2024 Clausura

Argentina

- Pan American Games Silver Medal: 2019
