= Sandra Arévalo =

Peruvian footballer (born 1998)

Personal information
- Full name: Sandra Lizbeth Arévalo Hinostroza
- Date of birth: 14 April 1998 (age 28)
- Place of birth: Lima, Peru
- Height: 1.56 m (5 ft 1 in)
- Position: Midfielder

Team information
- Current team: Atlético San Luis
- Number: 28

Senior career*
Years	Team	Apps	(Gls)
2014–2017	Alianza Lima		
2017–2018	JC Sport Girls		
2019–2021	Sporting Cristal		
2022–2023	Alianza Lima		
2024–2025	Universitario de Deportes		
2026–	Atlético San Luis	2	(0)

International career^{‡}
2012–2013	Peru U17	1+	(1)
2017–2018	Peru U20	1+	(1)
2018–	Peru	7	(0)
- * Club domestic league appearances and goals as of 6 February 2026 ‡ National team caps and goals as of 6 August 2019

Sandra Lizbeth Arévalo Hinostroza (born 14 April 1998) is a Peruvian footballer who plays as a midfielder for Atlético San Luis and the Peru women's national team.

== International career ==
Arévalo represented Peru at two South American U-17 Women's Championship editions (2012 and 2013) and the 2018 South American U-20 Women's Championship.

=== International goals ===
Scores and results list Peru's goal tally first

No.	Date	Venue	Opponent	Score	Result	Competition
1.	10 April 2026	Estadio Garcilaso, Cusco, Peru	Uruguay	2–1	2–1	2025–26 CONMEBOL Women's Nations League
2.	9 June 2026	Estadio Miguel Grau, Callao, Peru	Bolivia	4–0	4–0	2025–26 CONMEBOL Women's Nations League
