= Luciana Gómez (footballer, born 2000) =

Uruguayan football and futsal player

Personal information
- Full name: Luciana Daniela Gómez Montans
- Date of birth: 12 November 2000 (age 25)
- Positions: Midfielder; defender (futsal)

Team information
- Current team: Atlético Mineiro
- Number: 10

Youth career
- 2014–2015: Colón
- 2017–2018: Liverpool Montevideo
- 2019: Nacional

Senior career*
Years	Team	Apps	(Gls)
2015–2016	Colón	3	(0)
2018	Liverpool Montevideo	4	(2)
2018–2019	Nacional (futsal)	3+	(3)
2019–2021	Nacional	20	(5)
2022–	Atlético Mineiro	7	(0)

International career^{‡}
2021–	Uruguay	14	(1)
- * Club domestic league appearances and goals as of 2 May 2022 ‡ National team caps and goals as of 25 May 2025.

Luciana Daniela Gómez Montans (born 28 July 2000) is a Uruguayan professional footballer who plays as a midfielder for Brazilian Série A1 side Atlético Mineiro and the Uruguay women's national team. She is also a futsal player who plays as a defender.

== Club career ==
Gómez has played for Colón, Liverpool and Nacional in Uruguay.

== International career ==
Gómez made her senior debut for Uruguay on 12 June 2021 in a 5–1 friendly home win over Puerto Rico.

== International goals ==
No.	Date	Venue	Opponent	Score	Result	Competition
1.	18 February 2023	Stade Raymond Kopa, Angers, France	France	1–1	1–5	2023 Tournoi de France
