= Cindy Novoa =

Peruvian footballer (born 1995)

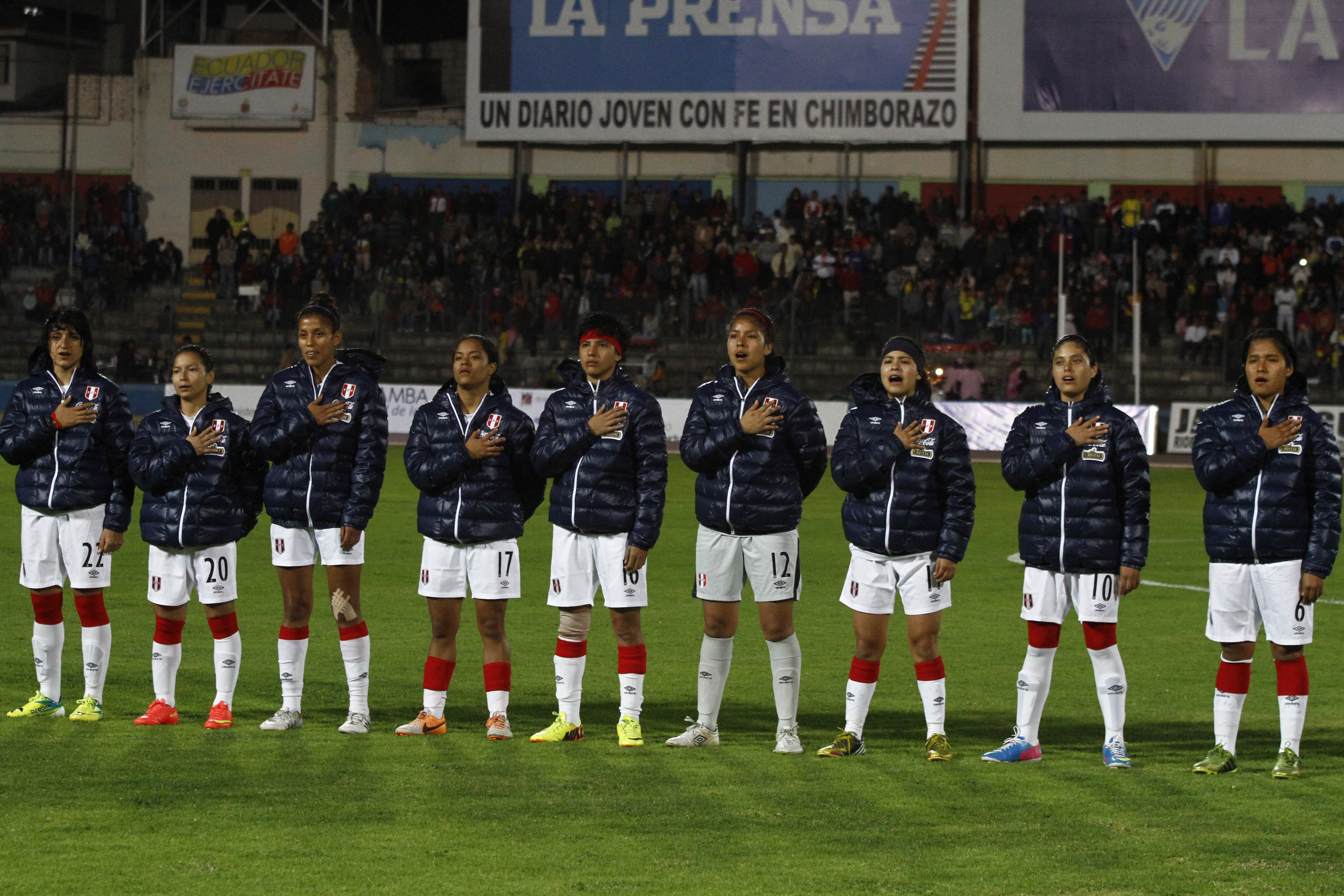
- Novoa representing Peru at the 2014 Copa América Femenina

Personal information
- Full name: Cindy Magalí Novoa Díaz
- Date of birth: 10 August 1995 (age 31)
- Place of birth: Amazonas, Peru
- Height: 1.66 m (5 ft 5 in)
- Positions: Centre back; midfielder

Team information
- Current team: Universitario De Deportes

Senior career*
Years	Team	Apps	(Gls)
- Sport Girls
- Universitario
2014	Deportivo Talleres		
201?–2021	Universitario		
2021–	Universitario		

International career^{‡}
2013–2014	Peru U20	?	(0)
2014–	Peru	8	(0)
- * Club domestic league appearances and goals ‡ National team caps and goals as of 6 August 2019

Cindy Magalí Novoa Díaz (born 10 August 1995) is a Peruvian footballer who plays as a centre back for Universitario De Deportes and the Peru women's national team.

== Early life ==
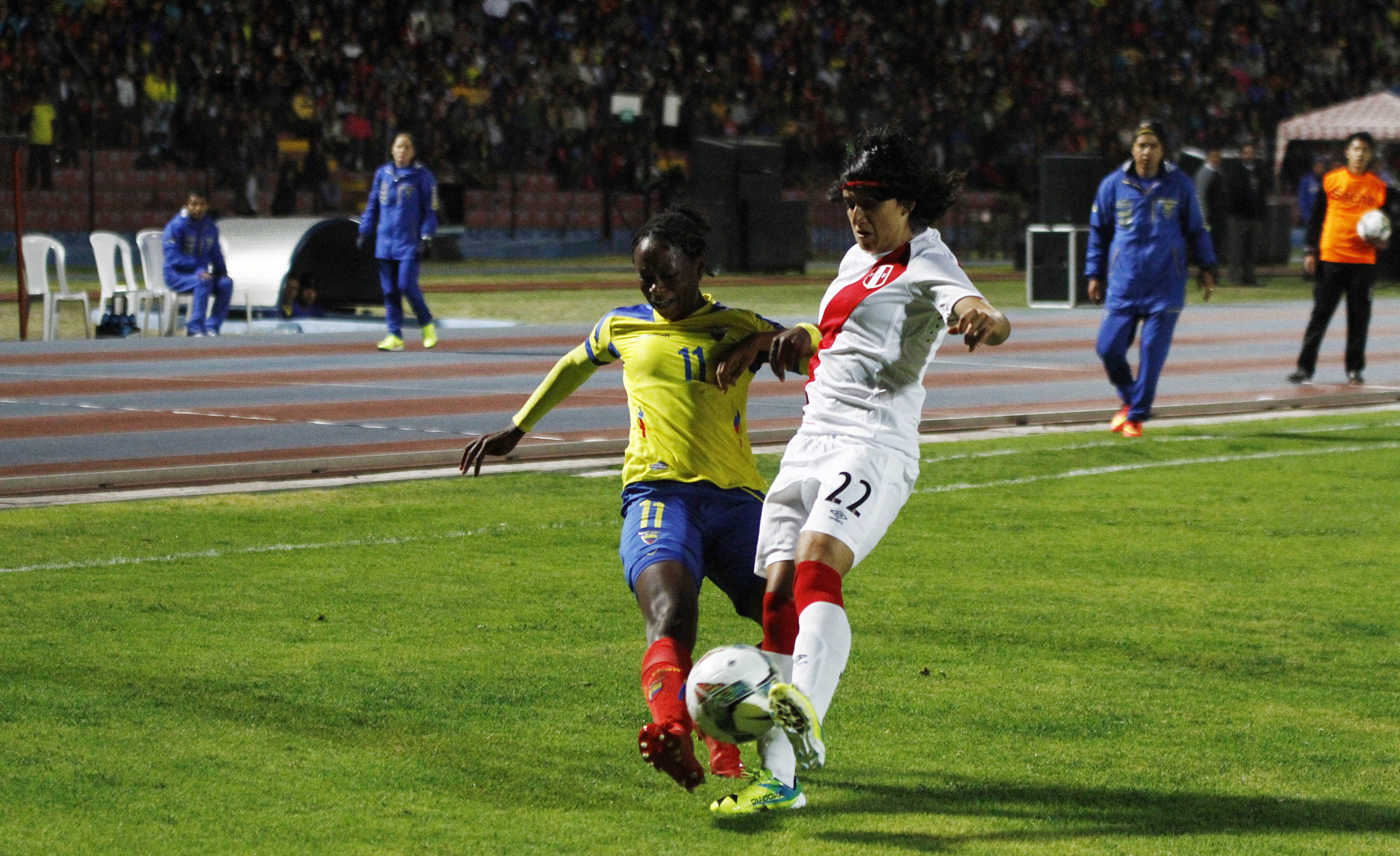
Novoa disputes the ball with Ecuador's Carina Caicedo during the 2014 Copa América Femenina.

Novoa was raised in Achamal, Amazonas.

== International career ==
Novoa represented Peru at the 2014 South American U-20 Women's Championship. At senior level, she played the 2014 Copa América Femenina and the 2019 Pan American Games.
