= Maikerlin Astudillo =

Venezuelan footballer (born 1992)

Personal information
- Full name: Maikerlin Faviana Astudillo Sequera
- Date of birth: 10 May 1992 (age 34)
- Place of birth: Puerto Ordaz, Venezuela
- Height: 1.59 m (5 ft 3 in)
- Position: Midfielder

Team information
- Current team: Rayo Vallecano
- Number: 5

Senior career*
| Years | Team | Apps | (Gls) |
| 2012–2019 | Estudiantes Guárico | | |
| 2019–2020 | Real Betis | 0 | (0) |
| 2020 | CFF Cáceres | 3 | (0) |
| 2020–2021 | Racing Santander | 21 | (4) |
| 2021–2023 | AEM | 27 | (0) |
| 2023 | FC Dornbirn | | |
| 2023–2024 | Getafe CF | | |
| 2024– | Rayo Vallecano | | |

International career
| 2018–2023 | Venezuela | 8 | (0) |
- * Club domestic league appearances and goals as of 28 May 2022

Maikerlin Faviana Astudillo Sequera (born 10 May 1992) is a Venezuelan footballer who plays as a midfielder for Spanish club Rayo Vallecano and the Venezuela women's national team.

== International career ==
Astudillo made her senior debut for Venezuela on 5 April 2018, in a Copa América Femenina match against Ecuador.
