= Ariel Longo =

Uruguayan footballer and manager (born 1953)

Personal information
- Full name: Ariel Eduardo Longo De Caterina
- Date of birth: 7 August 1953 (age 73)
- Place of birth: Montevideo, Uruguay
- Position: Defender

Team information
- Current team: Uruguay (women) (manager)

Youth career
- Sud América

Senior career*
Years	Team	Apps	(Gls)
1969	Sud América		

Managerial career
- 1987: Alto Perú
- 1988: Colón FC (youth)
- 1988–1990: Sud América (youth)
- 1989: Sud América (interim)
- 1991: Sud América
- 1992–1996: Liverpool Montevideo (youth)
- 1992: Liverpool Montevideo (interim)
- 1996: Liverpool Montevideo
- 1997: Shanghai Yuyuan
- 2000–2001: Real España
- 2002: Paysandú Bella Vista
- 2003–2004: Deportivo Xinabajul
- 2005: Sud América
- 2006: Cerrito
- 2007: Tacuarembó
- 2008: Durazno
- 2008–2009: Juventud de Las Piedras
- 2009–2010: Deportivo Jalapa
- 2010–2011: Deportivo Petapa
- 2011: Deportivo Jalapa
- 2013: Boston River
- 2014–2015: Deportivo Carchá
- 2015–: Uruguay U20 (women)
- 2017–: Uruguay (women)
- * Club domestic league appearances and goals

Ariel Eduardo Longo De Caterina (born 7 August 1953) is a Uruguayan football manager and former player who played as a defender. He is the current manager of the Uruguay women's football team.
