= Karol Bermúdez =

Uruguayan footballer (born 2001)

Personal information
- Full name: Karol Stefani Bermúdez Da Costa Martínez
- Date of birth: 18 April 2001 (age 25)
- Place of birth: Durazno, Uruguay
- Height: 1.66 m (5 ft 5 in)
- Positions: Central midfielder; defensive midfielder

Team information
- Current team: Red Bull Bragantino
- Number: 25

Youth career
- Colón

Senior career*
Years	Team	Apps	(Gls)
2018–2020	Liverpool Montevideo	14	(2)
2021	Nacional		
2022–2023	Atlético Mineiro	9	(0)
2024–	Red Bull Bragantino	32	(1)

International career^{‡}
2018	Uruguay U17	9	(0)
2018–	Uruguay U20	3	(1)
2019–	Uruguay	1	(0)
- * Club domestic league appearances and goals as of 25 December 2025 ‡ National team caps and goals as of 8 October 2019

Karol Stefani Bermúdez Da Costa Martínez (born 18 April 2001) is a Uruguayan professional footballer who plays as a midfielder for Brazilian Série A1 side Red Bull Bragantino and the Uruguay women's national team.

== Career ==
In 2024, Bermúdez was signed by the Red Bull Bragantino team. She won the Copa Paulista with the team in 2025.

== International career ==
Bermúdez represented Uruguay at the 2018 South American U-17 Women's Championship, the 2018 FIFA U-17 Women's World Cup and the 2018 South American U-20 Women's Championship. She made her senior debut on 8 October 2019 in a 1–3 friendly loss to Chile.

== Honours ==
=== Red Bull Bragantino ===
- Copa Paulista: 2025
