= Liliana Neyra =

Peruvian footballer (born 1993)

Liliana Neyra Venegas (born 22 June 1993) is a Peruvian footballer who plays as a striker for Alianza Lima.

== Early life ==
Neyra was born in Lima, Peru, in 1993.

== Club career ==
In 2014 and 2015, Neyra played for Peruvian side Alianza Lima. After that, she visited Portugal in 2016 to meet her nephew, born to a Portuguese father and Peruvian mother in Portugal. She remained in Portugal and eventually signed for Portuguese second-tier side Amora, helping them earn promotion to the Portuguese top flight, and experienced the Coronavirus pandemic while playing for the club. In 2022, she returned to Alianza Lima.

== International career ==
Neyra has represented the Peru women's national football team internationally.

== Style of play ==
Neyra mainly operates as a striker.

== Personal life ==
Neyra regards Lucy Bronze, Virginia Torrecilla, and Megan Rapinoe as her football inspirations.
