= Pierina Núñez =

Peruvian footballer (born 2000)

Personal information
- Full name: Pierina Nicoll Núñez Cordero
- Date of birth: 13 March 2000 (age 26)
- Place of birth: Piura, Peru
- Height: 1.68 m (5 ft 6 in)
- Position: Forward

Team information
- Current team: Universitario

Youth career
- Escuela Deportiva Eibar (Piura)

Senior career*
Years	Team	Apps	(Gls)
2015	Sport Girls		
2016–2017	Universitario		
2018–2019	Sporting Cristal		
2019–2021	Logroño	9	(0)
2021–2023	Real Betis B	47	(15)
2022-2023	Real Betis	4	(0)
2023–2024	Alhama	22	(1)
2025	Universitario	26	(24)
2025-2026	Levante	6	(0)
2026	Universitario	23	(25)

International career
2013–2016	Peru U17		
2014–2018	Peru U20		
2018–	Peru	22	(4)
- * Club domestic league appearances and goals

Pierina Nicoll Núñez Cordero (born 13 March 2000) is a Peruvian professional footballer who plays as a forward for Universitario and the Peru women's national team. She also appears in the Spanish Liga F with the Real Betis first team.

== Club career ==
On 25 June 2019, Núñez was announced by Peruvian Football Federation as a player of Spanish club Logroño.

== International career ==
Núñez represented Peru at two South American U-17 Women's Championship editions (2013 and 2016) and three South American U-20 Women's Championship editions (2014, 2015 and 2018). At senior level, she played the 2018 Copa América Femenina and the 2019 Pan American Games.

== International goals ==
No.	Date	Venue	Opponent	Score	Result	Competition
1.	6 April 2024	Estadio Alejandro Morera Soto, Alajuela, Costa Rica	Costa Rica	1–3	1–5	Friendly
2.	24 October 2025	Estadio Atanasio Girardot, Medellín, Colombia	Colombia	1–1	1–4	2025–26 CONMEBOL Liga de Naciones Femenina
