= Scarleth Flores =

Peruvian footballer (born 1996)

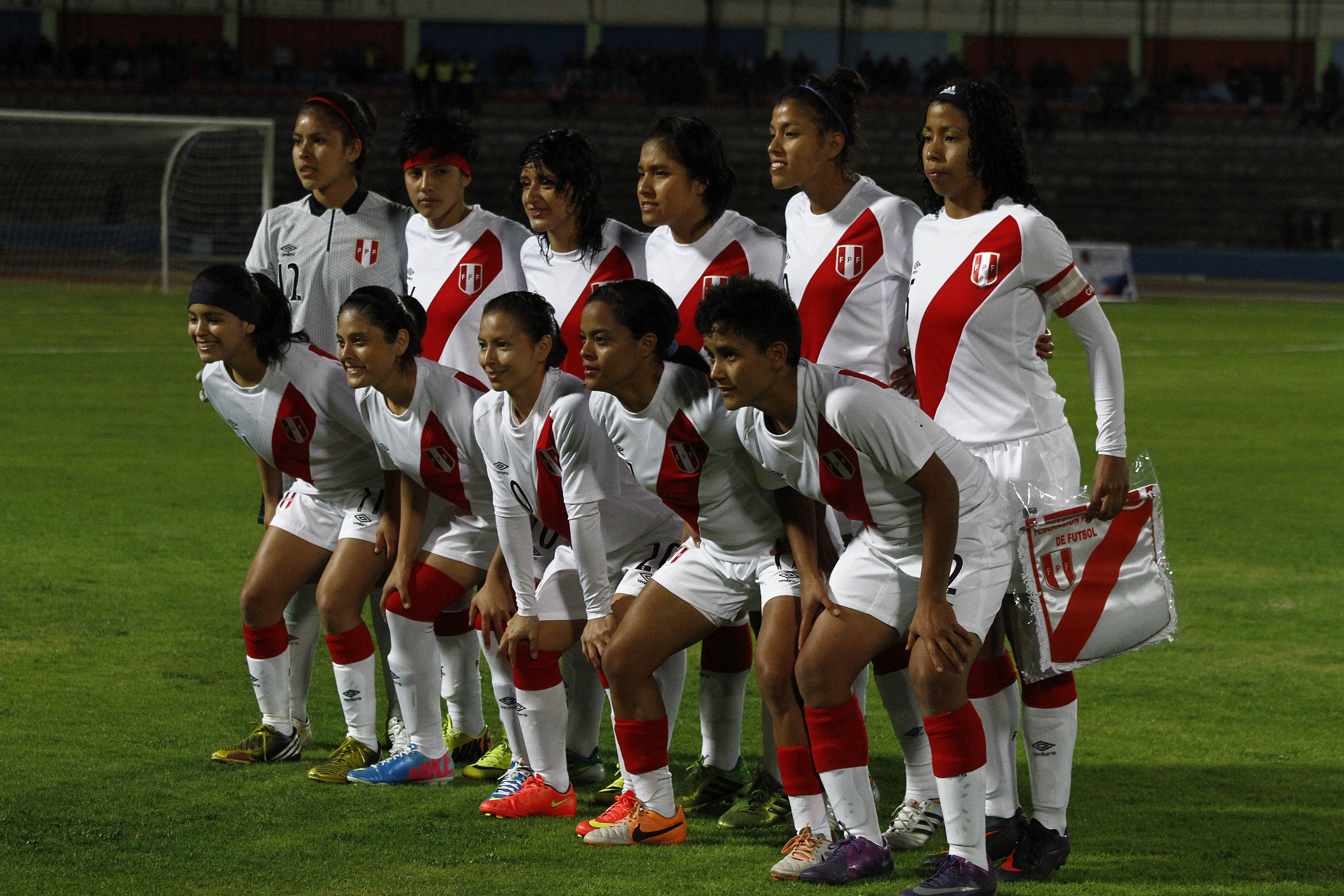
- Flores representing Peru at the 2014 Copa América Femenina

Personal information
- Full name: Scarleth Merryl Flores Lozano
- Date of birth: 12 August 1996 (age 30)
- Place of birth: Lima, Peru
- Height: 1.60 m (5 ft 3 in)
- Positions: Defensive midfielder; full back

Team information
- Current team: Universitario

Senior career*
Years	Team	Apps	(Gls)
- Sport Girls
- Alianza Lima
- Universitario

International career^{‡}
2012	Peru U17	?	(0)
2013–2015	Peru U20	1+	(1)
2010–	Peru	7	(1)
- * Club domestic league appearances and goals ‡ National team caps and goals as of 6 August 2019

Scarleth Merryl Flores Lozano (born 12 August 1996) is a Peruvian footballer who plays as a defensive midfielder for Club Universitario de Deportes and the Peru women's national team.

== International career ==
Flores represented Peru at the 2012 South American U-17 Women's Championship, the 2013 Bolivarian Games and two South American U-20 Women's Championship editions (2014 and 2015). At senior level, she played two Copa América Femenina editions (2010 and 2014) and the 2019 Pan American Games.

== International goals ==
No.	Date	Venue	Opponent	Score	Result	Competition
1.	9 April 2024	FCRF Sports Complex, Alajuela, Costa Rica	Costa Rica	1–2	1–2	Friendly
