= Gabriela Chávez (footballer) =

Argentine footballer (born 1989)

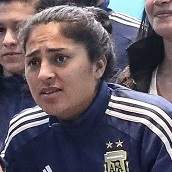
- Chávez in 2019

Personal information
- Full name: Gabriela Patricia Chávez
- Date of birth: 9 April 1989 (age 37)
- Place of birth: Buenos Aires, Argentina
- Height: 1.70 m (5 ft 7 in)
- Position: Midfielder

Team information
- Current team: Estudiantes (BA)

Senior career*
Years	Team	Apps	(Gls)
2006–2007	San Lorenzo		
2007–2009	Independiente		
2009–2011	Boca Juniors		
2017	UAI Urquiza		
2018	→ Platense (loan)		
2018–2019	River Plate		
2019–2022	Boca Juniors		
2022–	Estudiantes (BA)		

International career
2006–2008	Argentina U20	5	(0)
2006–	Argentina	11	(0)
Medal record
Women's football
Representing Argentina
Copa América Femenina
Third place	2018 Chile
Third place	2022 Colombia
Pan American Games
Silver medal – second place	2019 Lima	Team
- * Club domestic league appearances and goals

Gabriela Patricia Chávez (born 9 April 1989) is an Argentine footballer who plays as a midfielder for Estudiantes (BA) and the Argentina women's national team.

== International career ==
Chávez represented Argentina at two FIFA U-20 Women's World Cup editions (2006 and the 2008). At senior level, she played the 2006 South American Women's Football Championship, two Pan American Games editions (2007 and 2011), the 2007 FIFA Women's World Cup, the 2008 Summer Olympics and the 2018 Copa América Femenina.

== See also ==
- Argentina at the 2008 Summer Olympics
