= Emily Lima =

Portuguese football player and manager (born 1980)

Personal information
- Full name: Emily Alves da Cunha Lima
- Date of birth: 29 September 1980 (age 46)
- Place of birth: São Paulo, Brazil
- Position: Midfielder

Senior career*
Years	Team	Apps	(Gls)
1994–1996	Saad		
1997–2000	São Paulo		
2000	Palestra São Bernardo		
2001	Barra de Teresópolis		
2002	Veranópolis		
2003–2004	CFF Puebla		
2004–2006	Estudiantes Huelva		
2006–2008	Prainsa Zaragoza		
2008–2009	L’Estartit		
2009	Napoli	4	(0)

International career
2007–2009	Portugal	12	(0)

Managerial career
- 2011–2012: Juventus-SP (women)
- 2013–2015: Brazil U17 (women)
- 2015–2016: São José (women)
- 2016–2017: Brazil (women)
- 2017–2019: Santos (women)
- 2019–2022: Ecuador (women)
- 2023–2025: Peru (women)
- 2025: Levante Femenino
- 2026: Corinthians (women)
- * Club domestic league appearances and goals

Emily Alves da Cunha Lima (born 29 September 1980) is a football manager and former player.

During her playing career, she operated as a midfielder for clubs in Brazil, Spain and Italy, and has represented Portugal internationally. In 2016, she became the first female manager to coach the Brazil women's national team.

== Club career ==
Lima began her football career when she was 14 years old, on Saad Esporte Clube. In Brazil, she also played as a midfielder for São Paulo FC from 1997 to 2000, Palestra de São Bernardo, Barra de Teresópolis (2001) and Veranópolis (2002). Lima had also played for the Brazilian national under-17 women's football team.

In 2003, Lima moved to Spain, playing for the clubs Estudiantes de Huelva, Puebla de la Calzada, Prainsa de Zaragoza and L’Estartit. She finished her playing career in 2010, at the Italian club Napoli CF.

== International career ==
Born in Brazil, Lima has never played for clubs in Portugal, but she is of Portuguese descent, which allowed her to attain dual citizenship and play for the Portugal women's national team, making her debut in 2007.

== Managerial career ==
Back in Brazil, Lima pursued a coaching career. She became a coaching assistant for Portuguesa de Desportos in 2010. She became the titular coach of CA Juventus until 2013, when she was invited to manage the Brazilian under-17 team. In 2015, she coached São José Esporte Clube, the last Copa Libertadores Femenina champion. She led the club to second place at the 2015 Copa do Brasil.

In 2016, Lima was appointed as coach of the Brazilian women's national team in place of Vadão, thus becoming the first woman to coach the Seleção Feminina. Lima's first competition as national coach was the Torneio Internacional de Manaus, on which she led the team to their seventh title. She was fired from the Brazilian team in September 2017; under her run, the Seleção won seven games, lost five and drew one.

In July 2021, she went on to manage the Ecuador women's national team. She resigned after Ecuador's defeat to Paraguay at Copa América Femenina 2022.

In April 2023, she became manager of the Peru women's national team. In September 2025, her position as manager was succeeded by Antonio Spinelli.
