= Antonio Spinelli (football manager) =

Argentine football manager (born 1980)

Personal information
- Full name: Antonio Marcelo Spinelli
- Date of birth: 3 December 1980 (age 45)
- Place of birth: Buenos Aires, Argentina
- Height: 1.77 m (5 ft 10 in)

Team information
- Current team: Peru (women) (manager)

Managerial career
- Years: Team
- 2009–2011: Deportivo Morón (assistant)
- 2012–2013: Club Atlético Fénix (Youth)
- 2014–2016: Deportivo Español (Youth)
- 2017: Yupanqui (Youth)
- 2017–2021: Racing Femenino
- 2023–2024: Guadalajara (women)
- 2025–: Peru (women)

Antonio Marcelo Spinelli (born 3 December 1980) is an Argentine football manager. He is the current manager of the Peru women's national football team.

== Career ==
Between 2009 and 2017, Spinelli worked as a youth coach in several Argentine clubs.

In 2017, Spinelli was named the head coach of Racing Femenino, winning four cups in total.

In 2023, Spinelli was appointed as manager of Guadalajara (women) in the Liga MX Femenil.

In September 2025, he was appointed as manager of the Peru women's national football team, succeeding the role of Emily Lima.
