= Tainara =

Brazilian footballer

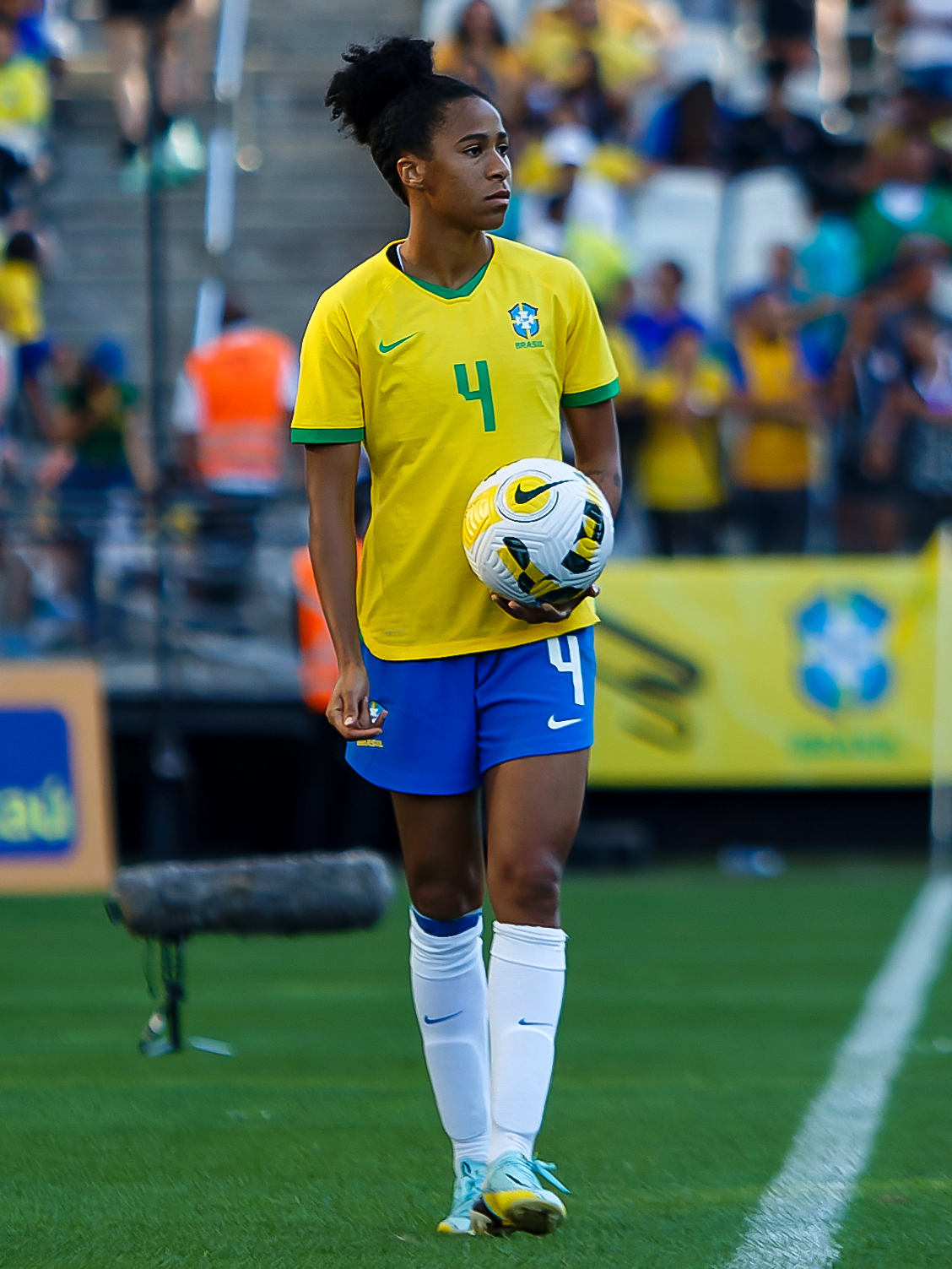
- Tainara with Brazil in 2022

Personal information
- Full name: Tainara de Souza da Silva
- Date of birth: 21 April 1999 (age 27)
- Place of birth: Brasília, Brazil
- Height: 1.69 m (5 ft 7 in)
- Position: Centre back

Senior career*
Years	Team	Apps	(Gls)
2016–2017	São Francisco	16	(0)
2017–2019	Vitória	21	(2)
2020	Santos	8	(1)
2021	Palmeiras	16	(2)
2022	Bordeaux	10	(0)
2022–2025	Bayern Munich	18	(1)
2026–	Cruzeiro		

International career^{‡}
2016	Brazil U17	3	(0)
2018	Brazil U20	5	(0)
2021–	Brazil	25	(0)
- * Club domestic league appearances and goals as of 17:09, 23 November 2025 (UTC) ‡ National team caps and goals as of 14:12, 26 April 2024 (UTC)

Tainara de Souza da Silva (born 21 April 1999), simply known as Tainara or sometimes Tay, is a Brazilian professional footballer who plays as a central defender in Cruzeiro and for the Brazil national team.

== Club career ==
Born in Brasília, Federal District, Tainara made her senior debut with São Francisco in 2016. She made her league debut against Vitória on 27 January 2016.

She subsequently played for Vitória. Tainara scored her first league goal against Minas Brasilia on 26 April 2019, scoring in the 89th minute.

Tainara joined Santos in January 2020. She made her league debut against Iranduba on 14 February 2020. Tainara scored her first league goal against Osasco Audax, scoring in the 18th minute.

A regular starter for Santos, Tainara moved to Palmeiras on 15 January 2021. She scored on her league debut, scoring against Ferroviária on 19 April 2021, scoring in the 45th+3rd minute.

Roughly one year later, she moved abroad after signing a two-and-a-half-year contract with French side Bordeaux. Tainara made her league debut against Stade de Reims on 22 January 2022.

Tainara was announced at Bayern Munich on 31 May 2022. She made her league debut against Eintracht Frankfurt on 16 September 2022. Tainara scored her first league goal against Köln on 16 October 2022, scoring in the 68th minute. She became the first Brazilian to score for Bayern Munich.

On 3 January 2026, Tainara was announced at Cruzeiro, signing a two-year contract with the Serie A1 team.

== International career ==
Tainara made her U17 debut against Nigeria U17s on 1 October 2016. She made her U20 debut against USA U20s on 30 June 2018.

After representing Brazil at under-17 and under-20 sides, Tainara received her first call-up for the full side in September 2020. She made her full international debut on 18 February 2021, starting in a 4–1 SheBelieves Cup win over Argentina.

== Career statistics ==
=== International ===
As of 8 March 2022

Brazil
Year	Apps	Goals
2021	7	0
2022	3	0
Total	10	0

== Honours ==
Santos

- Copa Paulista: 2020

Palmeiras

- Copa Paulista: 2021

Bayern Munich

- Frauen-Bundesliga: 2022–23, 2023–24

Brazil

- Copa América Femenina: 2022
- Torneio Internacional de Futebol Feminino: 2021
