= Marina Delgado =

Argentine footballer (born 1995)

Personal information
- Full name: Marina Melani Delgado
- Date of birth: 12 June 1995 (age 31)
- Place of birth: Mar del Plata, Argentina
- Height: 1.62 m (5 ft 4 in)
- Position: Right-back

Team information
- Current team: Newell's Old Boys

Senior career*
Years	Team	Apps	(Gls)
- UAI Urquiza
2023	Lokomotiv Moscow	3	(0)
2023–2024	Atlético San Luis	16	(0)

International career^{‡}
2019–	Argentina	11	(0)
Medal record
Women's football
Representing Argentina
Copa América Femenina
Third place	2022 Colombia
- * Club domestic league appearances and goals as of 26 March 2024 ‡ National team caps and goals as of 9 October 2022

Marina Melani Delgado (born 12 June 1995) is an Argentine footballer who plays as a full-back for Newell's Old Boys and the Argentina women's national team.

== International career ==
Delgado made her senior debut for Argentina on 7 November 2019, in a 2–1 away friendly won against Paraguay.

== Honors and awards ==
UAI Urquiza

- Primera División A: 2018–19
