= Belén Aquino =

Uruguayan footballer (born 2002)

Personal information
- Full name: Belén Aquino Moreira
- Date of birth: 1 February 2002 (age 24)
- Place of birth: Montevideo, Uruguay
- Height: 1.60 m (5 ft 3 in)
- Positions: Midfielder; winger; striker

Team information
- Current team: Corinthians

Senior career*
Years	Team	Apps	(Gls)
2015–2019	Colón		
2019–2020	Progreso		
2020–2022	Peñarol	33	(29)
2023–2025	Internacional	33	(9)
2026–	Corinthians	0	(0)

International career^{‡}
2018	Uruguay U17	3	(1)
2020–2022	Uruguay U20	8	(11)
2019–	Uruguay	15	(10)
- * Club domestic league appearances and goals as of 28 August 2024 ‡ National team caps and goals as of 13 July 2024

Belén Aquino Moreira (born 1 February 2002) is a Uruguayan professional footballer who plays as a midfielder, winger, or striker for Brazilian Série A1 club Corinthians and the Uruguay women's national team.

== Early life ==
Aquino was born in 2002 in the Conciliación barrio of Montevideo, Uruguay.

== Education ==
Aquino attended university in Brazo Oriental, Uruguay.

== Career ==
Aquino started her career with Uruguayan side Colón.

== Style of play ==
Aquino operates as a midfielder, winger, or striker, and is right-footed. She has received comparisons to Uruguay international Luis Suárez.

== Personal life ==
Aquino is the daughter of Uruguayan journalist Pablo Aquino. She has a brother.

== Career statistics ==
No.	Date	Venue	Opponent	Score	Result	Competition
1.	12 June 2021	Estadio Centenario, Montevideo, Uruguay	Puerto Rico	2–0	5–1	Friendly
2.	12 June 2021	Estadio Centenario, Montevideo, Uruguay	Puerto Rico	3–0	5–1	Friendly
3.	28 November 2021	Estadio Deportivo Cali, Palmira, Colombia	Colombia	1–2	2–2	Friendly
4.	28 November 2021	Estadio Deportivo Cali, Palmira, Colombia	Colombia	2–2	2–2	Friendly
5.	18 July 2022	Estadio Centenario, Armenia, Colombia	Peru	2–0	6–0	2022 Copa América Femenina
6.	21 February 2023	Stade Francis Le Basser, Laval, France	Denmark	2–1	2–3	2023 Tournoi de France
7.	7 April 2023	Estadio Centenario, Montevideo, Uruguay	Peru	3–0	6–1	Friendly
8.	11 April 2023	Estadio Centenario, Montevideo, Uruguay	Peru	1–0	3–0	Friendly
9.	31 May 2024	Estadio Centenario, Montevideo, Uruguay	Russia	1–0	1–1	Friendly
10.	3 June 2024	Estadio Centenario, Montevideo, Uruguay	Russia	2–1	2–1	Friendly
11.	10 July 2024	Estadio Ciudad de Caseros, Caseros, Argentina	Argentina	1–0	2–0	Friendly
12.	13 July 2024	Predio Lionel Andrés Messi, Ezeiza, Argentina	Argentina	1–1	1–1	Friendly
13.	22 February 2025	CARFEM, Ypané, Paraguay	Paraguay	2–1	2–1	Friendly
14.	11 July 2025	Estadio Banco Guayaquil, Quito, Ecuador	Ecuador	1–0	2–2	2025 Copa América Femenina
15.	28 October 2025	Estadio Centenario, Montevideo, Uruguay	Argentina	2–1	2–2	2025–26 CONMEBOL Liga de Naciones Femenina
