= Nahomi Martínez =

Peruvian footballer (born 1997)

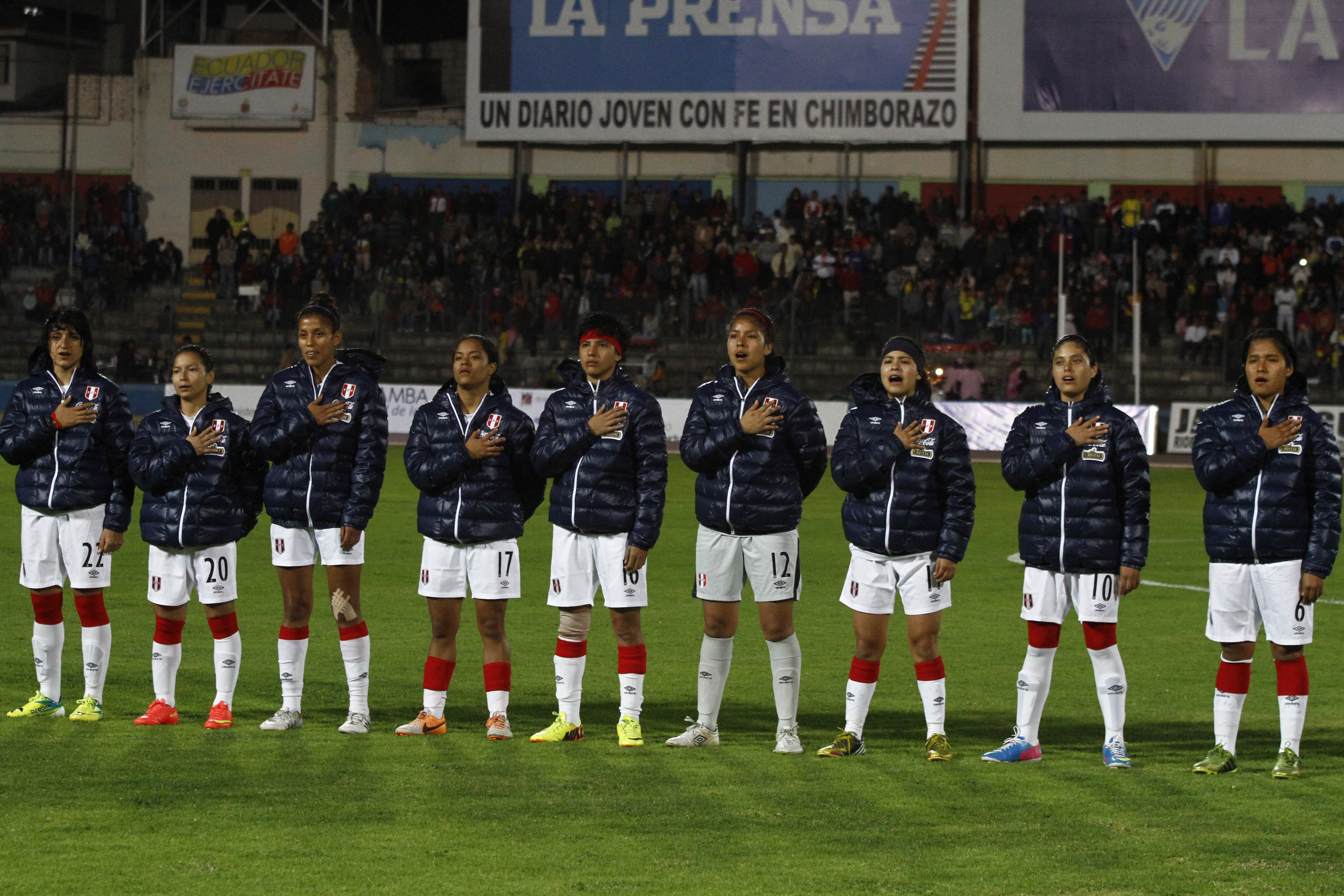
- Martínez representing Peru at the 2014 Copa América Femenina

Personal information
- Full name: Gretta Nahomi Martínez Flores
- Date of birth: 5 April 1997 (age 29)
- Place of birth: Lima, Peru
- Height: 1.60 m (5 ft 3 in)
- Position: Midfielder

Team information
- Current team: Universitario

Senior career*
Years	Team	Apps	(Gls)
201?–2020	Sporting Cristal		
2020–	Universitario	0	(0)

International career^{‡}
2013	Peru U17	1+	(1)
2013–2017	Peru U20	1+	(1)
2014–	Peru	10	(1)
- * Club domestic league appearances and goals ‡ National team caps and goals as of 6 August 2019

Gretta Nahomi Martínez Flores (born 5 April 1997), known as Nahomi Martínez, is a Peruvian footballer who plays as a midfielder for Club Universitario de Deportes and the Peru women's national team.

== International career ==
Martínez represented Peru at the 2013 South American U-17 Women's Championship and two South American U-20 Women's Championship editions (2014 and 2015). At senior level, she played two Copa América Femenina editions (2014 and 2018) and the 2019 Pan American Games.

=== International goals ===
Scores and results list Peru's goal tally first

No.	Date	Venue	Opponent	Score	Result	Competition
1	8 April 2018	Estadio La Portada, La Serena, Chile	Uruguay	1–0	1–1	2018 Copa América Femenina
