= Mariana Pion =

Uruguayan footballer (born 1992)

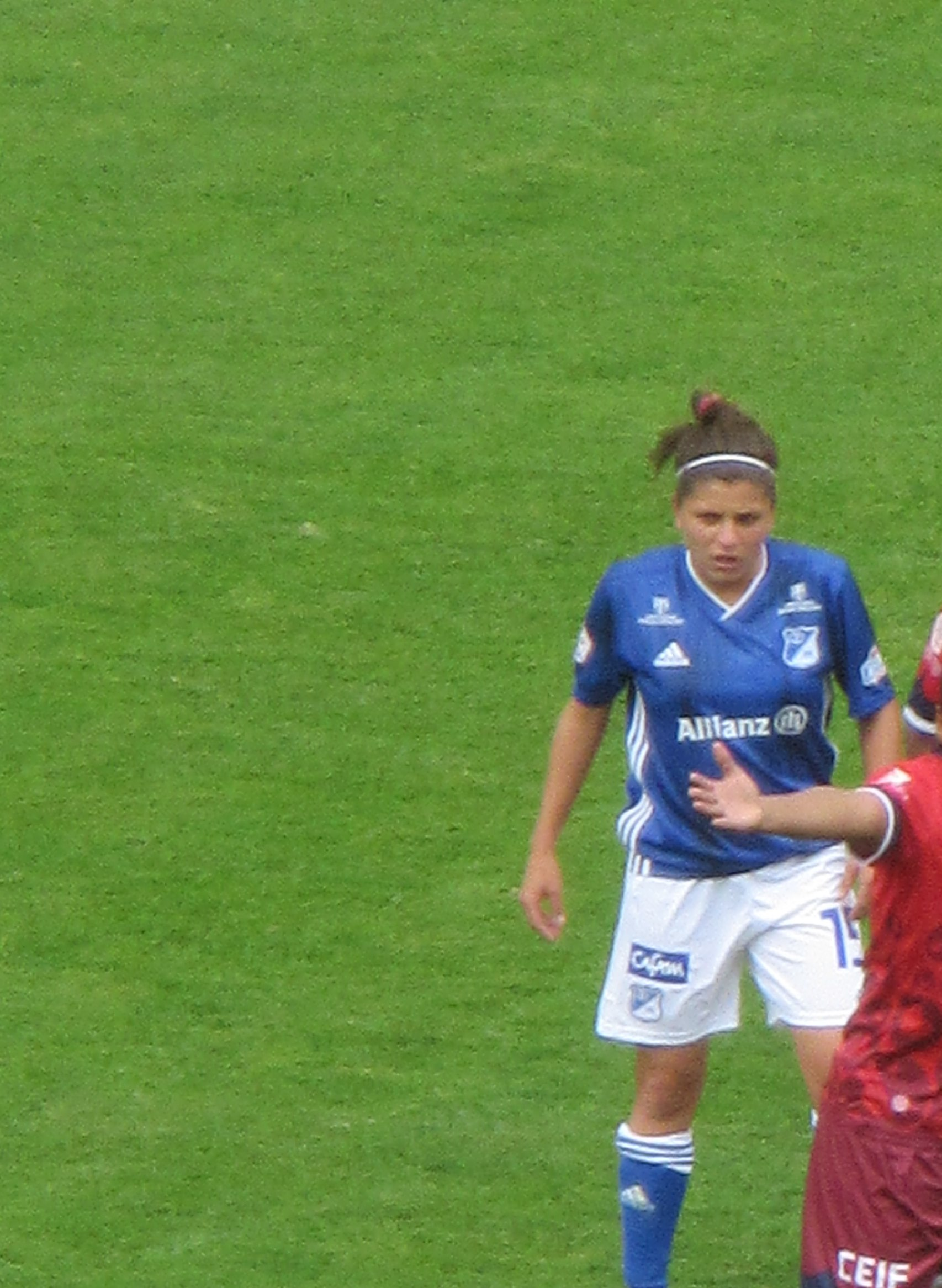
- Pion playing for Colombian club Millonarios FC

Personal information
- Full name: Mariana Alejandra Pion Núñez
- Date of birth: 19 December 1992 (age 33)
- Place of birth: San José de Mayo, Uruguay
- Height: 1.52 m (5 ft 0 in)
- Position: Midfielder

Team information
- Current team: Libertad/Limpeño

Senior career*
Years	Team	Apps	(Gls)
2011–2014	Nacional		
2014–2016	Colón	37	(31)
2017	River Plate Montevideo	10	(2)
2017	Sportivo Limpeño		
2018	Atlético Nacional		
2019	Osasco Audax	6	(0)
2019	Millonarios		
2020–	Libertad/Limpeño		

International career^{‡}
2012	Uruguay U20	1+	(1)
2014–	Uruguay	13	(1)
- * Club domestic league appearances and goals as of 15 May 2019 ‡ National team caps and goals as of 25 May 2025

Mariana Alejandra Pion Núñez (born 19 December 1992) is a Uruguayan professional footballer who plays as a midfielder for Paraguayan Women's Championship club Libertad/Limpeño and the Uruguay women's national team.

== Club career ==
Pion played in Uruguay for Nacional, Colón and River Plate.

== International career ==
Pion represented Uruguay at the 2012 South American U-20 Women's Championship. At senior level, she played two Copa América Femenina editions (2010 and 2014).

=== International goals ===
Scores and results list Uruguay's goal tally first

No.	Date	Venue	Opponent	Score	Result	Competition
1	15 September 2014	Estadio Olímpico de Riobamba, Riobamba, Ecuador	Peru	1–1	2–1	2014 Copa América Femenina
