= Sofía Ramondegui =

Uruguayan footballer (born 2001)

Personal information
- Full name: Sofía Ramondegui Correa
- Date of birth: 26 March 2001 (age 25)
- Place of birth: Nueva Palmira, Uruguay
- Height: 1.72 m (5 ft 8 in)
- Position: Defender

Youth career
- Club Sauce
- Palmirense

Senior career*
Years	Team	Apps	(Gls)
2017–2020	Palmirense		
2020	Liverpool Montevideo		
2020–2023	Peñarol		
2024	Avaí	3	(0)
2024	Cruz Azul	5	(0)

International career^{‡}
2018	Uruguay U17		
2021–	Uruguay	1	(0)
- * Club domestic league appearances and goals as of 17 May 2024 ‡ National team caps and goals as of 25 April 2022

Sofía Ramondegui Correa (born 26 March 2001) is a Uruguayan professional footballer who plays as a defender for Liga MX Femenil club Cruz Azul and the Uruguay women's national team.

== Early life ==
Ramondegui was born in Nueva Palmira. She played youth football for Club Sauce and Palmirense.

== International career ==
On 15 June 2021, Ramondegui earned her first cap for Uruguay in a 3–0 friendly victory over Puerto Rico at Estadio Luis Franzini.
