= María Peraza =

Venezuelan footballer (born 1994)

Personal information
- Full name: María Alejandra Peraza Romero
- Date of birth: 17 January 1994 (age 32)
- Place of birth: Barquisimeto, Venezuela
- Height: 1.71 m (5 ft 7 in)
- Position: Centre-back

Team information
- Current team: Puebla
- Number: 2

Senior career*
Years	Team	Apps	(Gls)
–2015	Caracas		
2015–2016	Rocafuerte		
2015	→ Espuce (loan)		
2016	L.D.U. Quito		
2017–2018	Santa Fe		
2019–2021	Millonarios		
2021–2022	Atlético Nacional		
2022–2024	Cruz Azul	56	(3)
2024–2026	Santos Laguna	37	(0)
2026–	Puebla	0	(0)

International career^{‡}
2014	Venezuela U20		
2014–	Venezuela		
Medal record
Women's football
Representing Venezuela
Central American and Caribbean Games
Silver medal – second place	2023 San Salvador
- * Club domestic league appearances and goals as of 5 February 2026 ‡ National team caps and goals as of 15 September 2014

María Alejandra Peraza Romero (born 17 January 1994) is a Venezuelan footballer who plays as a centre back for Liga MX Femenil club Puebla. She has been a member of the Venezuela women's national team.

== International career ==
Peraza represented Venezuela at the 2014 South American U-20 Women's Championship. At senior level, she played the 2014 Copa América Femenina.
