= Josefina Villanueva =

Uruguayan footballer (born 2000)

Personal information
- Full name: Josefina Elisa Villanueva Arias
- Date of birth: 3 February 2000 (age 26)
- Place of birth: Durazno, Uruguay
- Height: 1.64 m (5 ft 4 1/2 in)
- Position: Goalkeeper

Team information
- Current team: Nacional (football, futsal)

Youth career
- 2014–2015: Colón
- 2018: Liverpool
- 2019: Progreso

Senior career*
Years	Team	Apps	(Gls)
2014–2017	Colón	14	(0)
2018–	Nacional (futsal)		
2019	Progreso	14	(0)
2020–	Nacional	0	(0)

International career^{‡}
2020	Uruguay U20	4	(0)
2019–	Uruguay	1	(0)
- * Club domestic league appearances and goals ‡ National team caps and goals as of 8 October 2019

Josefina Elisa Villanueva Arias (born 3 February 2000) is a Uruguayan footballer who plays as a goalkeeper for Club Nacional de Football and the Uruguay women's national team. She is also a futsal player who plays for Club Nacional de Football.

== International career ==
Villanueva made her senior debut for Uruguay on 8 October 2019.
