= Natascha Honegger =

Brazilian footballer (born 1997)

Personal information
- Full name: Natascha Jennifer Honegger
- Date of birth: 27 September 1997 (age 29)
- Place of birth: Uster, Switzerland
- Height: 1.81 m (5 ft 11 in)
- Position: Goalkeeper

Youth career
- FC Zürich
- FC Witikon

Senior career*
Years	Team	Apps	(Gls)
2016–2017	Derendingen	8	(0)
2017–2019	Luzern	58	(0)
2019–2021	Paris	12	(0)
2021–2023	Corinthians	3	(0)
2022	→ Flamengo/Marinha (loan)	7	(0)
2023	Basel	2	(0)
2024–	Palmeiras	2	(0)

International career^{‡}
2014–2016	Switzerland U19	8	(0)
2020–	Brazil	1	(0)
- * Club domestic league appearances and goals as of 15:08, 13 April 2024 ‡ National team caps and goals as of 10 March 2020

Natascha Jennifer Honegger (born 27 September 1997) is a Swiss-born Brazilian professional footballer who plays as a goalkeeper for Palmeiras and the Brazil national team. She also played for the Switzerland national under-19 team.

== Career ==
=== Paris ===
Natascha joined Paris in July 2019. She made her league debut against PSG on 15 December 2019.

=== Corinthians ===
Natascha made her league debut against Bahia on 30 May 2021.

=== Flamengo ===
Natascha made her league debut against Grêmio on 29 May 2022.

=== Basel ===
Natascha joined FC Basel in 2023. She made her league debut against Luzern on 22 April 2023.

=== Palmeiras ===
Natascha made her league debut against Botafogo on 24 March 2024.

== International career ==
Natascha made her Swiss U19 debut against Bulgaria U19s on 15 September 2014.

Natascha decided to represent Brazil in the future. She made her Brazil debut against Netherlands on 4 March 2020. Brazil goalkeeping coach Veludo recommended Natascha.
