= Ruth Bravo =

Argentine footballer (born 1992)

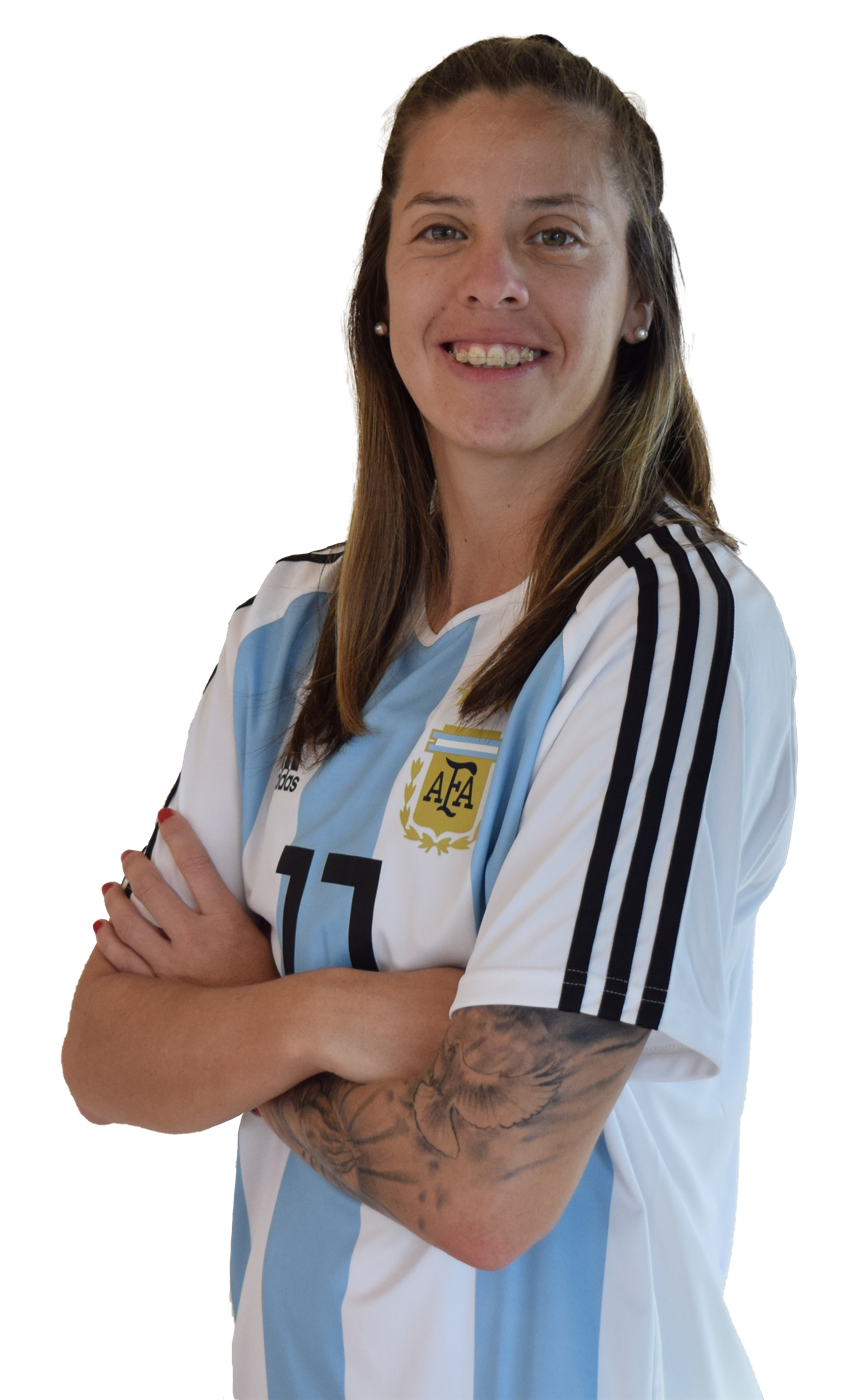

Personal information
- Full name: Linda Ruth Bravo
- Date of birth: 6 March 1992 (age 34)
- Place of birth: Salta, Salta, Argentina
- Height: 1.63 m (5 ft 4 in)
- Position: Defensive midfielder

Team information
- Current team: Al-Ahli
- Number: 8

Youth career
- Estudiantes (LP)

Senior career*
Years	Team	Apps	(Gls)
- Estudiantes (LP)
2015–2018	Boca Juniors		
2018–2019	Tacón	18	(1)
2019–2021	Rayo Vallecano	34	(0)
2021–2022	Pachuca	31	(1)
2022–2026	León	109	(11)
2026–	Al-Ahli	0	(0)

International career
2018–	Argentina	12	(1)
- * Club domestic league appearances and goals as of 9 February 2026

Linda Ruth Bravo (born 6 March 1992) is an Argentine footballer who plays as a midfielder for Saudi Women's Premier League club Al-Ahli and the Argentina national team. Her nickname is Chule.

== International career ==
Bravo scored one goal at the 2018 Copa América Femenina.

=== International goals ===
Scores and results list Argentina's goal tally first

No.	Date	Venue	Opponent	Score	Result	Competition
1	9 April 2018	Estadio Municipal Francisco Sánchez Rumoroso, Coquimbo, Chile	Ecuador	3–0	6–3	2018 Copa América Femenina

== Personal life ==
Bravo was raised in Magdalena, Buenos Aires Province.
