= Germán Portanova =

Argentine football player and manager

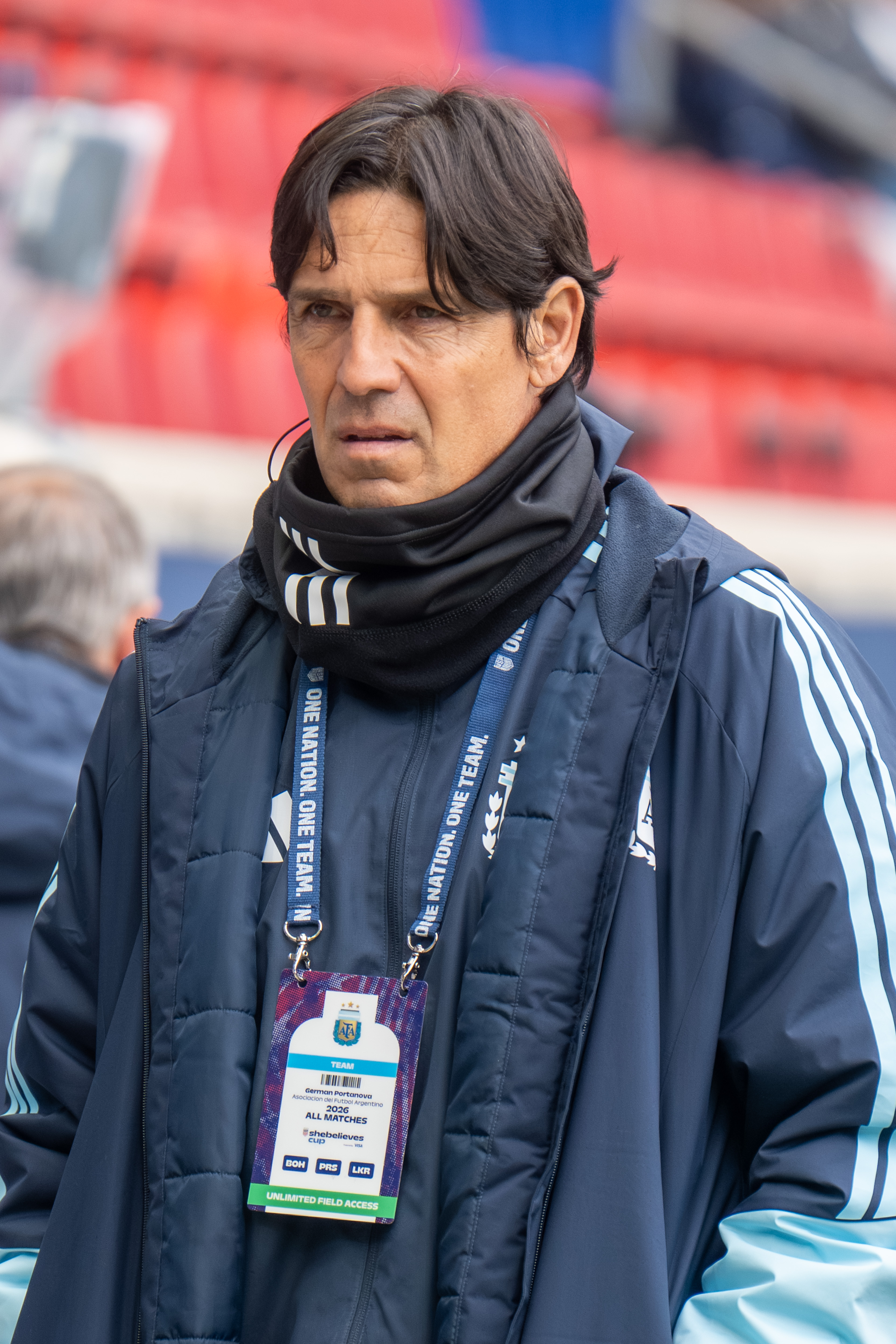
- Portanova in 2026

Personal information
- Full name: Germán Darío Portanova
- Date of birth: 19 October 1973 (age 53)
- Place of birth: Buenos Aires, Argentina
- Height: 1.74 m (5 ft 9 in)
- Position: Midfielder

Team information
- Current team: Argentina Women (manager)

Senior career*
Years	Team	Apps	(Gls)
1994–1996	Chacarita Juniors		
1996–1997	Tristán Suárez		
1997–1998	Cerro Porteño		
1999–2001	Rangers		
2001	Racing de Ferrol		
2002	Tristán Suárez		
2002–2003	Melipilla		

Managerial career
- UAI Urquiza women
- 2021–: Argentina women
- * Club domestic league appearances and goals as of 31 July 2021

Germán Darío Portanova (born 19 October 1973) is an Argentine football manager and former player. He has played as a midfielder for clubs of Argentina, Chile, Paraguay and Spain. He currently manages the Argentina women's national team.

== Coaching career ==
He coached Argentina in the 2022 Copa América Femenina, guiding the team to qualify for the 2023 FIFA Women's World Cup, making him the first manager other than Carlos Borrello to do so.
