= Lorena González (footballer) =

Uruguayan footballer (born 1989)

Personal information
- Full name: Lorena Patricia González Silva
- Date of birth: 24 April 1989 (age 37)
- Place of birth: Melo, Uruguay
- Height: 1.65 m (5 ft 5 in)
- Position: Centre-back

Senior career*
Years	Team	Apps	(Gls)
–2014	Arachanas (Melo)		
2015	→ Colón (loan)		
2016–2019	Colón	55	(19)
2019–	Grêmio	1	(0)

International career^{‡}
2014–	Uruguay	13	(0)
- * Club domestic league appearances and goals as of 22 August 2021 ‡ National team caps and goals as of 14 May 2025

Lorena Patricia González Silva (born 24 April 1989) is a Uruguayan professional footballer who plays as a centre-back for the Uruguay women's national team.

== International career ==
González capped for Uruguay during the 2014 Copa América Femenina.
