= Andrea Fernanda Tovar =

Venezuelan footballer (born 1990)

Andrea Tovar
Personal information
- Full name: Andrea Fernanda Tovar de la Peña
- Date of birth: 22 August 1990 (age 36)
- Place of birth: Caracas, Venezuela
- Height: 1.80 m (5 ft 11 in)
- Position: Goalkeeper

Senior career*
Years	Team	Apps	(Gls)
2008–2014	Caracas FC		
2015–2016	São José		
2017	Deportivo La Guaira		
2018	Alianza Petrolera		
2018–2019	Alavés Gloriosas		
2019–2020	Pyrgos Limassol		
2020–2022	CD Getafe Femenino		

International career^{‡}
2010	Venezuela	1	(0)
- * Club domestic league appearances and goals ‡ National team caps and goals as of 25 July 2010

Andrea Fernanda "Ea" Tovar de la Peña (born 22 August 1990) is a Venezuelan footballer who plays as a goalkeeper for the Venezuela women's national team.

She formerly played in the domestic Venezuelan women's football championship with Caracas FC and Deportivo La Guaira, in the domestic Campeonato Brasileiro de Futebol Feminino with São José Esporte Clube in Brazil and in the domestic Colombian Women's Football League with Alianza Petrolera FC in Colombia.

== Awards ==
- Venezuelan Women's Cup 2008-09
- Venezuelan Women's Cup 2009-10
- Venezuelan Women's Cup 2010-11
- Venezuelan Women's Cup 2011-12
