= 2025 Copa América Femenina Group A =

Football tournament results

The 2025 Copa América Femenina Group A was the first of two sets in the group stage of the 2025 Copa América Femenina that took place from 11 July 2025 to 2 August 2025. The group competition consisted of hosts Ecuador, Argentina, Chile, Uruguay, and Peru.

The top two teams automatically qualified for the top four knockout stage, while third place moved on to a fifth place match against the third-place finisher of Group B. In the knockout stage, the two finalists qualified to the 2028 Summer Olympics and the third and fourth classified (semifinalists) and the fifth (after playing the final duel) will get three places for the 2027 Pan American Games tournament in Lima (in addition to Peru that qualified automatically as hosts). Otherwise, the fourth and fifth classified are was eliminated.

== Teams ==
Draw position	Team	Pot	Finals appearance	Previous best performance	FIFA Rankings
A1	Ecuador	Seed	9th	Third place (2014)	67
A2	Argentina	1	9th	Champions (2006)	32
A3	Chile	2	10th	Runners-up (1991, 2018)	39
A4	Uruguay	3	8th	Third place (2006)	63
A5	Peru	4	8th	Third place (1998)	77

== Standings ==
Pos	Team	Pld	W	D	L	GF	GA	GD	Pts	Qualification
1	Argentina	4	4	0	0	6	1	+5	12	Advance to semi-finals
2	Uruguay	4	2	1	1	6	3	+3	7	Advance to semi-finals
3	Chile	4	2	0	2	6	6	0	6	Advance to fifth place match
4	Ecuador (H)	4	1	1	2	6	7	−1	4	
5	Peru	4	0	0	4	1	8	−7	0	

Source: CONMEBOL
Rules for classification: Group stage tiebreakers
(H) Hosts

== Matches ==
=== Ecuador vs Uruguay ===
11 July 2025
19:00

Ecuador	2–2	Uruguay
Correa 72' (o.g.); Arias 78'	Report (WEB) Report (CONMEBOL)	Aquino 11'; Pa. González 53' (pen.)

Estadio Banco Guayaquil, Quito
Referee: Daiane Muniz (Brazil)

Ecuador	Uruguay

GK	12	Andrea Morán
DF	2	Mayerli Rodríguez
DF	19	Kerlly Real		(substituted off) 89'
DF	15	Manoly Baquerizo	(yellow card) 17'	(substituted off) 45'
DF	16	Ligia Moreira (c)
MF	5	Stefany Cedeño		(substituted off) 77'
MF	23	Jessy Caicedo		(substituted off) 64'
MF	20	Danna Pesántez
MF	21	Milagro Barahona		(substituted off) 45'
MF	10	Joselyn Espinales
FW	9	Nayely Bolaños
Substitutes:
GK	1	Kathya Mendoza
GK	22	Liceth Suárez
DF	3	Ariana Lomas
DF	4	Justine Cuadra		(substituted on) 77'
DF	6	Noemí Camacho
MF	14	Fiorella Pico
MF	17	Geomara Arreaga		(substituted on) 89'
FW	7	Emily Arias		(substituted on) 45'
FW	8	Evelyn Cedeño
FW	11	Karen Flores		(substituted on) 45'
FW	13	Nicole Charcopa		(substituted on) 64'
FW	18	Rosa Flores
Manager:
(Ecuador) Eduardo Moscoso

GK	12	Agustina Sánchez
DF	4	Laura Felipe	(yellow card) 19'
DF	19	Wendy Carballo		(substituted off) 79'
DF	2	Stephanie Lacoste
DF	7	Stephanie Tregartten
MF	8	Ximena Velazco		(substituted off) 79'
MF	17	Pilar González		(substituted off) 60'
MF	16	Yannel Correa
FW	10	Belén Aquino		(substituted off) 69'
FW	9	Pamela González (c)	(yellow card) 90+1'
FW	21	Juliana Viera		(substituted off) 60'
Substitutes:
GK	1	Romina Olmedo
GK	13	Sofía Olivera
DF	3	Daiana Farías	(yellow card) 90+6'	(substituted on) 79'
DF	15	Fátima Barone
DF	18	Alison Latúa
MF	5	Micaela Fitipaldi		(substituted on) 69'
MF	6	Sindy Ramírez
MF	20	Angela Gómez		(substituted on) 79'
MF	23	Ilana Guedes		(substituted on) 60'
FW	11	Esperanza Pizarro
FW	14	Alaides Bonilla		(substituted on) 60'
FW	22	Yamila Dornelles
Manager:
(Uruguay) Ariel Longo

Player of the match:
Emily Arias (Ecuador)

Assistant referees:
Leila Moreira (Brazil)
Maira Mastella (Brazil)
Fourth official:
Adriana Farfán (Bolivia)

=== Peru vs Chile ===
12 July 2025
16:00

Peru	0–3	Chile
	Report (WEB) Report (CONMEBOL)	Cabezas 62'; Keefe 82'; Valencia 90+4'

Estadio Banco Guayaquil, Quito
Referee: Emikar Calderas (Venezuela)

Peru	Chile

GK	12	Maryory Sánchez
DF	2	Gianella Romero
DF	13	Mia León
DF	3	Tifani Molina
DF	14	Scarleth Flores
MF	15	Emily Flores
MF	18	Allison Azabache	(substituted off) 45'
MF	6	Claudia Cagnina
MF	8	Geraldine Cisneros (c)	(substituted off) 79'
MF	22	Mía Obando	(substituted off) 45'
FW	9	Pierina Núñez
Substitutes:
GK	1	Savannah Madden
GK	23	Lucía Arcos
DF	4	Braelynn Llamoca
DF	5	Rosa Castro
DF	17	Fabiola Herrera
FW	7	Sandy Dorador
FW	10	Alondra Vílchez
FW	11	Xioczana Canales
FW	16	Yomira Tacilla	(substituted on) 79'
FW	19	Birka Ruíz	(substituted on) 45'
FW	20	Valerie Gherson
FW	21	Raquel Bilcape	(substituted on) 45'
Manager:
(Brazil) Emily Lima

GK	1	Antonia Canales
DF	2	Michelle Acevedo
DF	4	Catalina Figueroa
DF	17	Fernanda Pinilla
DF	22	Rosario Balmaceda	(yellow card) 86'	(substituted off) 45'
MF	6	Yastin Jiménez
MF	5	Nayadet López	(yellow card) 35'	(substituted off) 45'
MF	10	Yanara Aedo (c)
FW	14	Vaitiare Pardo		(substituted off) 45'
FW	19	Pamela Cabezas		(substituted off) 76'
FW	7	Yenny Acuña		(substituted off) 85'
Substitutes:
GK	12	Ryann Torrero
GK	23	Gabriela Bórquez
DF	3	Fernanda Ramírez
DF	13	Claudia Salfate
DF	18	Camila Sáez		(substituted on) 86'
MF	8	Karen Araya
MF	11	Yessenia López		(substituted on) 45'
MF	15	Gisela Pino		(substituted on) 85'
MF	20	Anaís Álvarez
FW	9	Sonya Keefe		(substituted on) 76'
FW	16	Franchesca Caniguán
FW	21	Mary Valencia		(substituted on) 45'
Manager:
(Chile) Luis Mena

Player of the match:
Pamela Cabezas (Chile)

Assistant referees:
Migdalia Rodríguez (Venezuela)
Francis García (Venezuela)
Fourth official:
María Victoria Daza (Colombia)

=== Uruguay vs Argentina ===
15 July 2025
16:00

Uruguay	0–1	Argentina
	Report (WEB) Report (CONMEBOL)	Bonsegundo 76'

Estadio Banco Guayaquil, Quito
Referee: Zulma Quiñónez (Paraguay)

Uruguay	Argentina

GK	12	Agustina Sánchez
DF	4	Carina Felipe		(substituted off) 78'
DF	16	Yannel Correa		(substituted off) 67'
DF	2	Stephanie Lacoste
DF	7	Stephanie Tregartten
MF	8	Ximena Velazco		(substituted off) 78'
MF	20	Angela Gómez
MF	9	Pamela González (c)
MF	11	Esperanza Pizarro		(substituted off) 56'
FW	19	Wendy Carballo	(yellow card) 81' (yellow-red card) 81'
FW	10	Belén Aquino		(substituted off) 67'
Substitutes:
GK	1	Romina Olmedo
GK	13	Sofía Olivera
DF	3	Daiana Farías		(substituted on) 67'
DF	15	Fátima Barone
DF	18	Alison Latúa
DF	21	Juliana Viera		(substituted on) 56'
MF	5	Micaela Fitipaldi		(substituted on) 78'
MF	6	Sindy Ramírez		(substituted on) 78'
MF	17	Pilar González
MF	22	Ilana Guedes
FW	14	Alaides Bonilla		(substituted on) 67'
FW	23	Yamila Dornelles
Manager:
(Uruguay) Ariel Longo

GK	1	Solana Pereyra
DF	22	Betina Soriano	(substituted off) 88'
DF	13	Sophia Braun
DF	6	Aldana Cometti (c)
DF	3	Eliana Stábile
MF	18	Carolina Troncoso	(substituted off) 54'
MF	8	Daiana Falfán
MF	10	Maricel Pereyra
MF	16	Sofía Domínguez
FW	11	Yamila Rodríguez	(substituted off) 68'
FW	15	Florencia Bonsegundo
Substitutes:
GK	12	Renata Masciarelli
GK	23	Abigaíl Chaves
DF	2	Adriana Sachs
DF	4	Catalina Roggerone
DF	14	Milagros Iara Martín
MF	5	Vanina Preininger	(substituted on) 88'
MF	19	Agostina Holzheier	(substituted on) 68'
MF	20	Virginia Gómez
FW	7	Margarita Giménez
FW	9	Kishi Núñez	(substituted on) 54'
FW	17	Francisca Altgelt
FW	21	Paulina Gramaglia
Manager:
(Argentina) Germán Portanova

Player of the match:
Florencia Bonsegundo (Argentina)

Assistant referees:
Nadia Weiler (Paraguay)
Nancy Fernández (Paraguay)
Fourth official:
Emikar Calderas (Venezuela)

=== Peru vs Ecuador ===
15 July 2025
19:00

Peru	1–3	Ecuador
Bilcape 69'	Report (WEB) Report (CONMEBOL)	Arias 16'; Bolaños 42' (pen.); Moreira 90+7'

Estadio Banco Guayaquil, Quito
Referee: Ivana Projkovska (North Macedonia)

Peru	Ecuador

GK	12	Maryory Sánchez (c)
DF	2	Gianella Romero	(yellow card) 22'	(substituted off) 68'
DF	3	Tifani Molina
DF	13	Mia León
DF	14	Scarleth Flores
MF	15	Emily Flores		(substituted off) 45'
MF	22	Mía Obando		(substituted off) 68'
MF	6	Claudia Cagnina		(substituted off) 88'
MF	18	Allison Azabache		(substituted off) 82'
MF	21	Raquel Bilcape
FW	9	Pierina Núñez
Substitutes:
GK	1	Savannah Madden
GK	23	Lucía Arcos
DF	4	Braelynn Llamoca
DF	5	Rosa Castro
DF	17	Fabiola Herrera
MF	8	Geraldine Cisneros		(substituted on) 45'
FW	7	Sandy Dorador	(yellow card) 90+1'	(substituted on) 68'
FW	10	Alondra Vílchez
FW	11	Xioczana Canales		(substituted on) 68'
FW	16	Yomira Tacilla		(substituted on) 82'
FW	19	Birka Ruíz
FW	20	Valerie Gherson		(substituted on) 88'
Manager:
(Brazil) Emily Lima

GK	12	Andrea Morán
DF	19	Kerlly Real
DF	2	Mayerli Rodríguez
DF	16	Ligia Moreira (c)	(yellow card) 55'
DF	15	Manoly Baquerizo
MF	7	Emily Arias		(substituted off) 82'
MF	5	Stefany Cedeño
MF	10	Joselyn Espinales		(substituted off) 68'
MF	20	Danna Pesántez		(substituted off) 45'
FW	11	Karen Flores		(substituted off) 68'
FW	9	Nayely Bolaños
Substitutes:
GK	1	Kathya Mendoza
GK	22	Liceth Suárez
DF	3	Ariana Lomas
DF	4	Justine Cuadra		(substituted on) 68'
DF	6	Noemí Camacho
DF	23	Jessy Caicedo
MF	14	Fiorella Pico
MF	17	Geomara Arreaga
FW	8	Evelyn Cedeño	(yellow card) 90+2'	(substituted on) 82'
FW	13	Nicole Charcopa		(substituted on) 45'
FW	18	Rosa Flores		(substituted on) 68'
FW	21	Milagro Barahona
Manager:
(Ecuador) Eduardo Moscoso

Player of the match:
Nayely Bolaños (Ecuador)

Assistant referees:
Giulia Tempestilli (Italy)
Iragartze Fernández (Spain)
Fourth official:
Daiane Muniz (Brazil)

=== Uruguay vs Peru ===
18 July 2025
16:00

Uruguay	1–0	Peru
Aquino 64'	Report (WEB) Report (CONMEBOL)

Estadio Banco Guayaquil, Quito
Referee: Adriana Farfán (Bolivia)

Uruguay	Peru

GK	12	Agustina Sánchez
DF	4	Carina Felipe
DF	16	Yannel Correa
DF	2	Stephanie Lacoste
DF	7	Stephanie Tregartten	(yellow card) 31'	(substituted off) 45'
MF	20	Ángela Gómez		(substituted off) 45'
MF	9	Pamela González (c)
MF	8	Ximena Velazco
MF	22	Ilana Guedes	(yellow card) 43'	(substituted off) 60'
FW	11	Esperanza Pizarro
FW	10	Belén Aquino		(substituted off) 86'
Substitutes:
GK	1	Romina Olmedo
GK	13	Sofía Olivera
DF	3	Daiana Farías
DF	15	Fátima Barone
DF	18	Alison Latúa
DF	21	Juliana Viera		(substituted on) 45'
MF	5	Micaela Fitipaldi
MF	6	Sindy Ramírez		(substituted on) 86'
MF	17	Pilar González
FW	14	Alaides Bonilla		(substituted on) 45'
FW	19	Wendy Carballo
FW	23	Yamila Dornelles		(substituted on) 60'
Manager:
(Uruguay) Ariel Longo

GK	1	Savannah Madden		(substituted off) 45'
DF	17	Fabiola Herrera (c)
DF	3	Tifani Molina
DF	13	Mia León		(substituted off) 84'
DF	14	Scarleth Flores
MF	7	Sandy Dorador		(substituted off) 59'
MF	6	Claudia Cagnina
MF	18	Allison Azabache		(substituted off) 45'
MF	21	Raquel Bilcape
FW	11	Xioczana Canales	(yellow card) 33'	(substituted off) 59'
FW	9	Pierina Núñez
Substitutes:
GK	12	Maryory Sánchez		(substituted on) 45'
GK	23	Lucía Arcos
DF	2	Gianella Romero		(substituted on) 45'
DF	4	Braelynn Llamoca
DF	5	Rosa Castro
MF	8	Geraldine Cisneros		(substituted on) 59'
MF	15	Emily Flores
FW	10	Alondra Vílchez
FW	16	Yomira Tacilla		(substituted on) 84'
FW	19	Birka Ruíz
FW	20	Valerie Gherson
FW	22	Mia Obando		(substituted on) 59'
Manager:
(Portugal) Emily Lima

Player of the match:
Belén Aquino (Uruguay)

Assistant referees:
Elizabeth Blanco (Bolivia)
Maricela Urapuca (Bolivia)
Fourth official:
Emikar Calderas (Venezuela)

=== Argentina vs Chile ===
18 July 2025
19:00

Argentina	2–1	Chile
Falfán 75'; Cometti 90'	Report (WEB) Report (CONMEBOL)	Pardo 11'

Estadio Banco Guayaquil, Quito
Referee: María Victoria Daza (Colombia)

Argentina	Chile

GK	1	Solana Pereyra
DF	16	Sofía Domínguez
DF	13	Sophia Braun	(yellow card) 40'
DF	6	Aldana Cometti (c)
DF	3	Eliana Stábile		(substituted off) 57'
MF	10	Maricel Pereyra		(substituted off) 63'
MF	22	Betina Soriano		(substituted off) 73'
MF	8	Daiana Falfán
MF	15	Florencia Bonsegundo
FW	11	Yamila Rodríguez		(substituted off) 57'
FW	9	Kishi Núñez		(substituted off) 73'
Substitutes:
GK	12	Renata Masciarelli
GK	23	Abigaíl Chaves
DF	2	Adriana Sachs
DF	4	Catalina Roggerone
DF	14	Milagros Iara Martín		(substituted on) 57'
MF	5	Vanina Preininger		(substituted on) 73'
MF	19	Agostina Holzheier	(yellow card) 77'	(substituted on) 57'
MF	20	Virginia Gómez
FW	7	Margarita Giménez
FW	17	Francisca Altgelt		(substituted on) 63'
FW	18	Carolina Troncoso
FW	21	Paulina Gramaglia	(yellow card) 78'	(substituted on) 73'
Manager:
(Argentina) Germán Portanova

GK	1	Antonia Canales
DF	22	Rosario Balmaceda
DF	4	Catalina Figueroa
DF	18	Camila Sáez
DF	17	Fernanda Pinilla
MF	11	Yessenia López		(substituted off) 70'
MF	6	Yastin Jiménez
MF	10	Yanara Aedo		(substituted off) 70'
FW	21	Mary Valencia	(yellow card) 13'	(substituted off) 83'
FW	8	Karen Araya (c)	(yellow card) 80'	(substituted off) 83'
FW	14	Vaitiare Pardo		(substituted off) 63'
Substitutes:
GK	12	Ryann Torrero
GK	23	Gabriela Bórquez
DF	2	Michelle Acevedo
DF	3	Fernanda Ramírez
DF	13	Claudia Salfate
MF	5	Nayadet López		(substituted on) 70'
MF	15	Gisela Pino		(substituted on) 83'
MF	20	Anaís Álvarez
FW	7	Yenny Acuña	(red card) 90+4'	(substituted on) 83'
FW	9	Sonya Keefe		(substituted on) 70'
FW	16	Franchesca Caniguán
FW	19	Pamela Cabezas		(substituted on) 63'
Manager:
(Chile) Luis Mena

Player of the match:
Vaitiare Pardo (Chile)

Assistant referees:
Mary Blanco (Colombia)
Mayra Sánchez (Colombia)
Fourth official:
Daiane Muniz (Brazil)

=== Argentina vs Peru ===
21 July 2025
16:00

Argentina	1–0	Peru
Rodríguez 88'	Report (WEB) Report (CONMEBOL)

Estadio Banco Guayaquil, Quito
Referee: Daiane Muniz (Brazil)

Argentina	Peru

GK	1	Solana Pereyra
DF	16	Sofía Domínguez		(substituted off) 71'
DF	4	Catalina Roggerone
DF	6	Aldana Cometti (c)
DF	14	Milagros Iara Martín
MF	10	Maricel Pereyra		(substituted off) 45'
MF	8	Daiana Falfán
MF	5	Vanina Preininger		(substituted off) 64'
MF	13	Sophia Braun
FW	21	Paulina Gramaglia		(substituted off) 45'
FW	9	Kishi Núñez		(substituted off) 45'
Substitutes:
GK	12	Renata Masciarelli
GK	23	Abigaíl Chaves
DF	2	Adriana Sachs
DF	3	Eliana Stábile
MF	15	Florencia Bonsegundo		(substituted on) 45'
MF	19	Agostina Holzheier		(substituted on) 45'
MF	20	Virginia Gómez
FW	7	Margarita Giménez
FW	11	Yamila Rodríguez		(substituted on) 45'
FW	17	Francisca Altgelt
FW	18	Carolina Troncoso	(yellow card) 78'	(substituted on) 71'
FW	22	Betina Soriano	(yellow card) 74'	(substituted on) 64'
Manager:
(Argentina) Germán Portanova

GK	12	Maryory Sánchez
DF	3	Tifani Molina		(substituted off) 71'
DF	17	Fabiola Herrera (c)		(substituted off) 85'
DF	4	Braelynn Llamoca
DF	14	Scarleth Flores
MF	13	Mia León	(yellow card) 53'
MF	16	Yomira Tacilla		(substituted off) 60'
MF	6	Claudia Cagnina
MF	7	Sandy Dorador		(substituted off) 60'
MF	21	Raquel Bilcape
FW	9	Pierina Núñez
Substitutes:
GK	1	Savannah Madden
GK	23	Lucía Arcos
DF	2	Gianella Romero		(substituted on) 60'
DF	5	Rosa Castro
DF	18'	Allison Azabache
MF	8	Geraldine Cisneros		(substituted on) 60'
MF	15	Emily Flores
FW	10	Alondra Vílchez
FW	11	Xioczana Canales		(substituted on) 85'
FW	19	Birka Ruíz	(yellow card) 90+4'	(substituted on) 71'
FW	20	Valerie Gherson
FW	22	Mia Obando
Manager:
(Portugal) Emily Lima

Player of the match:
Maryory Sánchez (Peru)

Assistant referees:
Leila Moreira (Brazil)
Maíra Mastella (Brazil)
Fourth official:
Ivana Projkovska (Macedonia)

=== Chile vs Ecuador ===
21 July 2025
19:00

Chile	2–1	Ecuador
Keefe 35'; N. López 45+5'	Report (WEB) Report (CONMEBOL)	Bolaños 24' (pen.)

Estadio Banco Guayaquil, Quito
Referee: Zulma Quiñónez (Paraguay)

Chile	Ecuador

GK	1	Antonia Canales	(yellow card) 90'
DF	2	Michelle Acevedo	(yellow card) 22'	(substituted off) 45'
DF	3	Fernanda Ramírez
DF	18	Camila Sáez
DF	17	Fernanda Pinilla
MF	5	Nayadet López	(yellow card) 59'	(substituted off) 87'
MF	6	Yastin Jiménez	(yellow card) 76'	(substituted off) 45'
MF	8	Karen Araya (c)		(substituted off) 81'
MF	10	Yanara Aedo
FW	9	Sonya Keefe		(substituted off) 90+3'
FW	14	Vaitiare Pardo		(substituted off) 45'
Substitutes:
GK	12	Ryann Torrero
GK	23	Gabriela Bórquez
DF	4	Catalina Figueroa		(substituted on) 87'
DF	13	Claudia Salfate
DF	22	Rosario Balmaceda		(substituted on) 45'
MF	11	Yessenia López		(substituted on) 81'
MF	15	Gisela Pino
MF	20	Anaís Álvarez
FW	7	Yenny Acuña
FW	16	Franchesca Caniguán
FW	19	Pamela Cabezas		(substituted on) 90+3'
FW	21	Mary Valencia		(substituted on) 45'
Manager:
(Chile) Luis Mena

GK	12	Andrea Morán
DF	19	Kerlly Real
DF	2	Mayerli Rodríguez
DF	16	Ligia Moreira (c)	(yellow card) 55'
DF	23	Jessy Caicedo	(yellow card) 26'	(substituted off) 45'
MF	7	Emily Arias		(substituted off) 71'
MF	5	Stefany Cedeño
MF	4	Justine Cuadra		(substituted off) 81'
MF	20	Danna Pesántez		(substituted off) 53'
FW	11	Karen Flores		(substituted off) 71'
FW	9	Nayely Bolaños
Substitutes:
GK	1	Kathya Mendoza
GK	22	Liceth Suárez
DF	3	Ariana Lomas
DF	6	Noemí Camacho
MF	10	Joselyn Espinales		(substituted on) 71'
MF	14	Fiorella Pico
MF	15	Manoly Baquerizo		(substituted on) 45'
MF	17	Geomara Arreaga
FW	8	Evelyn Burgos		(substituted on) 71'
FW	13	Nicole Charcopa		(substituted on) 53'
FW	18	Rosa Flores
FW	21	Milagro Barahona		(substituted on) 81'
Manager:
(Ecuador) Eduardo Moscoso

Player of the match:
Sonya Keefe (Chile)

Assistant referees:
Nadia Weiler (Paraguay)
Nancy Fernández (Paraguay)
Fourth official:
Adriana Farfán (Bolivia)

=== Ecuador vs Argentina ===
24 July 2025
19:00

Ecuador	0–2	Argentina
	Report (WEB) Report (CONMEBOL)	Núñez 19'; Bonsegundo 70'

Estadio Banco Guayaquil, Quito
Referee: Adriana Farfán (Bolivia)

Ecuador	Argentina

GK	12	Andrea Morán
DF	19	Kerlly Real
DF	2	Mayerli Rodríguez
DF	16	Ligia Moreira (c)
DF	23	Jessy Caicedo		(substituted off) 68'
MF	5	Stefany Cedeño		(substituted off) 68'
MF	15	Manoly Baquerizo		(substituted off) 59'
MF	4	Justine Cuadra	(yellow card) 90+1'
MF	9	Nayely Bolaños
FW	11	Karen Flores
FW	7	Emily Arias
Substitutes:
GK	1	Kathya Mendoza
GK	22	Liceth Suárez
DF	3	Ariana Lomas
DF	6	Noemí Camacho
DF	20	Danna Pesántez
MF	10	Joselyn Espinales	(yellow card) 90'	(substituted on) 59'
MF	14	Fiorella Pico
MF	17	Geomara Arreaga
FW	8	Evelyn Cedeño		(substituted on) 68'
FW	13	Nicole Charcopa		(substituted on) 68'
FW	18	Rosa Flores
FW	21	Milagro Barahona
Manager:
(Ecuador) Eduardo Moscoso

GK	23	Abigaíl Chaves
DF	4	Catalina Roggerone	(yellow card) 27'	(substituted off) 58'
DF	2	Adriana Sachs (c)
DF	20	Virginia Gómez
DF	3	Eliana Stábile
MF	18	Carolina Troncoso	(yellow card) 45+7'	(substituted off) 58'
MF	22	Betina Soriano	(yellow card) 80'
MF	5	Vanina Preininger
MF	7	Margarita Giménez		(substituted off) 68'
FW	21	Paulina Gramaglia		(substituted off) 78'
FW	9	Kishi Núñez	(yellow card) 60'	(substituted off) 68'
Substitutes:
GK	1	Solana Pereyra
GK	12	Renata Masciarelli
DF	6	Aldana Cometti
DF	13	Sophia Braun
DF	14	Milagros Martín
MF	8	Daiana Falfán
MF	10	Maricel Pereyra		(substituted off) 58'
MF	15	Florencia Bonsegundo		(substituted off) 68'
MF	16	Sofía Domínguez		(substituted off) 58'
MF	19	Agostina Holzheier		(substituted off) 78'
FW	11	Yamila Rodríguez		(substituted off) 68'
FW	17	Francisca Altgelt
Manager:
(Argentina) Germán Portanova

Player of the match:
Kishi Núñez (Argentina)

Assistant referees:
Elizabeth Blanco (Bolivia)
Maricela Urapuca (Bolivia)
Fourth official:
María Victoria Daza (Colombia)

=== Chile vs Uruguay ===
24 July 2025
19:00

Chile	0–3	Uruguay
	Report (WEB) Report (CONMEBOL)	Pa. González 40' (pen.); Carballo 65', 73'

Estadio Gonzalo Pozo Ripalda, Quito
Referee: Ivana Projkovska (North Macedonia)

Chile	Uruguay

GK	1	Antonia Canales
DF	22	Rosario Balmaceda		(substituted off) 71'
DF	3	Fernanda Ramírez
DF	18	Camila Sáez	(yellow card) 12'
DF	17	Fernanda Pinilla
MF	6	Yastin Jiménez
MF	10	Yanara Aedo		(substituted off) 71'
MF	21	Mary Valencia		(substituted off) 87'
MF	8	Karen Araya (c)
MF	7	Yenny Acuña		(substituted off) 45'
FW	9	Sonya Keefe
Substitutes:
GK	12	Ryann Torrero
GK	23	Gabriela Bórquez
DF	2	Michelle Acevedo
DF	4	Catalina Figueroa
DF	13	Claudia Salfate		(substituted on) 87'
MF	5	Nayadet López
MF	11	Yessenia López		(substituted on) 45'
MF	15	Gisela Pino
MF	20	Anaís Álvarez
FW	14	Vaitiare Pardo		(substituted on) 71'
FW	16	Franchesca Caniguán
FW	19	Pamela Cabezas		(substituted on) 71'
Manager:
(Chile) Luis Mena

GK	12	Agustina Sánchez
DF	4	Carina Felipe	(yellow card) 7'	(substituted off) 77'
DF	16	Yannel Correa
DF	2	Stephanie Lacoste
DF	7	Stephanie Tregartten	(yellow card) 88'
MF	19	Wendy Carballo		(substituted off) 76'
MF	8	Ximena Velazco
MF	9	Pamela González (c)	(yellow card) 77'
MF	21	Juliana Viera		(substituted off) 68'
FW	10	Belén Aquino		(substituted off) 58'
FW	11	Esperanza Pizarro
Substitutes:
GK	1	Romina Olmedo
GK	13	Sofía Olivera
DF	3	Daiana Farías
DF	15	Fátima Barone
DF	18	Alison Latúa
MF	5	Micaela Fitipaldi
MF	6	Sindy Ramírez		(substituted on) 76'
MF	17	Pilar González
MF	20	Ángela Gómez		(substituted on) 77'
MF	22	Ilana Guedes
FW	14	Alaides Bonilla		(substituted on) 58'
FW	23	Yamila Dornelles		(substituted on) 68'
Manager:
(Uruguay) Ariel Longo

Player of the match:
Wendy Carballo (Uruguay)

Assistant referees:
Giulia Tempestilli (Italy)
Iragartze Fernández (Spain)
Fourth official:
Emikar Calderas (Venezuela)

== Discipline ==
Fair play points will be used as tiebreakers in the group if the overall and head-to-head records of teams were tied. These are calculated based on yellow and red cards received in all group matches as follows:

- first yellow card: plus 1 point;
- indirect red card (second yellow card): plus 3 points;
- direct red card: plus 4 points;
- yellow card and direct red card: plus 5 points;

Team	Match 1				Match 2				Match 3				Match 4				Points
Team	Booked	(yellow card) (yellow-red card)	Sent off (straight red)	(yellow card) (red card)	Booked	(yellow card) (yellow-red card)	Sent off (straight red)	(yellow card) (red card)	Booked	(yellow card) (yellow-red card)	Sent off (straight red)	(yellow card) (red card)	Booked	(yellow card) (yellow-red card)	Sent off (straight red)	(yellow card) (red card)	Points
Ecuador (H)	1				2				1				2				-6
Argentina					3				2				4				-9
Chile	2				2		1		4				1				-13
Uruguay	3					1			2				3				-11
Peru					2				1				2				-5
