= SPA Alicante CF =

Spanish football club

SPA Alicante
- Full name: Sporting Plaza de Argel Alicante Club de Fútbol
- Nickname: amarillas
- Founded: 1995
- Ground: Municipal Divina Pastora, Alicante, Valencian Community, Spain
- Capacity: 300
- Chairman: Jesús Cañizares
- Manager: José Ignacio Martínez
- League: Segunda División
- 2013–14: Primera Nacional (Group 7), 2nd
- Website: https://www.spalicante.com/
Home colours

Sporting Plaza de Argel Alicante Club de Fútbol, also known formerly as Sporting Plaza de Argel or Hércules CF Femenino, is a Spanish women's football club from Alicante currently playing in Segunda División's Group 4.

== History ==
Founded in 1995, it was the first organized women's football team in the city.

In 1997 Sporting Plaza de Argel promoted to the second category for the first time, consolidating itself in the top part of the table throughout the following decade, but without attaining promotion the Superliga to date. Back then they used a yellow shirt, blue shorts kit which is nowadays their second uniform.

In 2007 the club signed a collaboration with Hércules CF. While remaining an independent club Sporting Plaza de Argel used Hércules' name, kit and crest for the next six years. When RFEF reformed and expanded the Superliga for the 2009-10 season it was rumored SPA/Hércules might be promoted but the club finally remained in Primera Nacional, as it was called then the current Segunda División.

In 2013 Hércules ended the agreement, and Sporting Plaza de Argel returned to its original form.

== Former internationals ==
- Chile: Nayadet López
- Costa Rica: Gabriela Trujillo
- Uruguay: Yannel Correa
- Spain: Sandra Paños
