= Claudia Salfate =

Chilean footballer

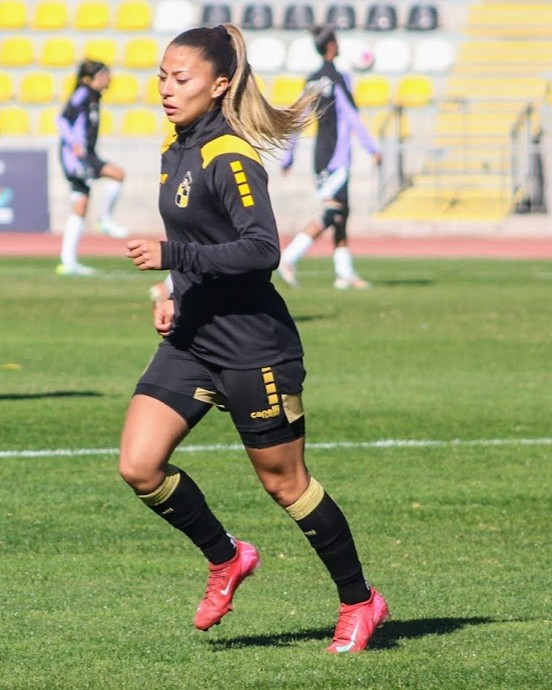
- Salfate with Coquimbo Unido in 2025

Personal information
- Full name: Claudia Francisca Salfate Araya
- Date of birth: 6 August 2003 (age 23)
- Place of birth: Coquimbo, Chile
- Height: 1.61 m (5 ft 3 in)
- Positions: Right winger; right-back

Team information
- Current team: Colo-Colo

Youth career
- Deportes La Serena

Senior career*
Years	Team	Apps	(Gls)
2018–2020	Deportes La Serena		
2021–2023	Everton		
2024–2025	Coquimbo Unido	28+	(3+)
2026–	Colo-Colo		

International career^{‡}
2018–2019	Chile U17		
2022	Chile U20	3	(0)
2024–	Chile	4	(0)
- * Club domestic league appearances and goals ‡ National team caps and goals as of 16 July 2024

Claudia Francisca Salfate Araya (born 6 August 2003) is a Chilean footballer who plays as a right winger for Colo-Colo and the Chile national team. Mainly a right winger, she can also operate as a right-back.

== Club career ==
Born in Coquimbo, Chile, Salfate started her career with Deportes La Serena.

In 2021, Salfate switched to Everton and signed her first professional contract in March 2023. As a member of Everton, she won the 2023 Primera B and got promotion to the top division as the top goalscorer with 28 goals. In addition, she was selected as the best player of the division.

In 2024, Salfate joined his hometown's club, Coquimbo Unido in the top division.

On 31 December 2025, Salfate joined Colo-Colo on a deal for two years.

== International career ==
In 2018, Salfate represented Chile at under-17 level in the South American Championship. The next year, she represented them in a friendly championship in Argentina.

In 2022, she represented the under-20's in the South American Championship.

At senior level, she made her debut in a 4–3 loss against Guatemala on 29 May 2024 in Guatemala City.

== Honours ==
Everton

- Primera B: 2023

Colo-Colo

- Primera División: 2026

Individual

- Primera B Top Goalscorer: 2023
- Premios FutFem - Primera B Best Player: 2023
