= Mary Valencia =

Chilean footballer (born 2003)

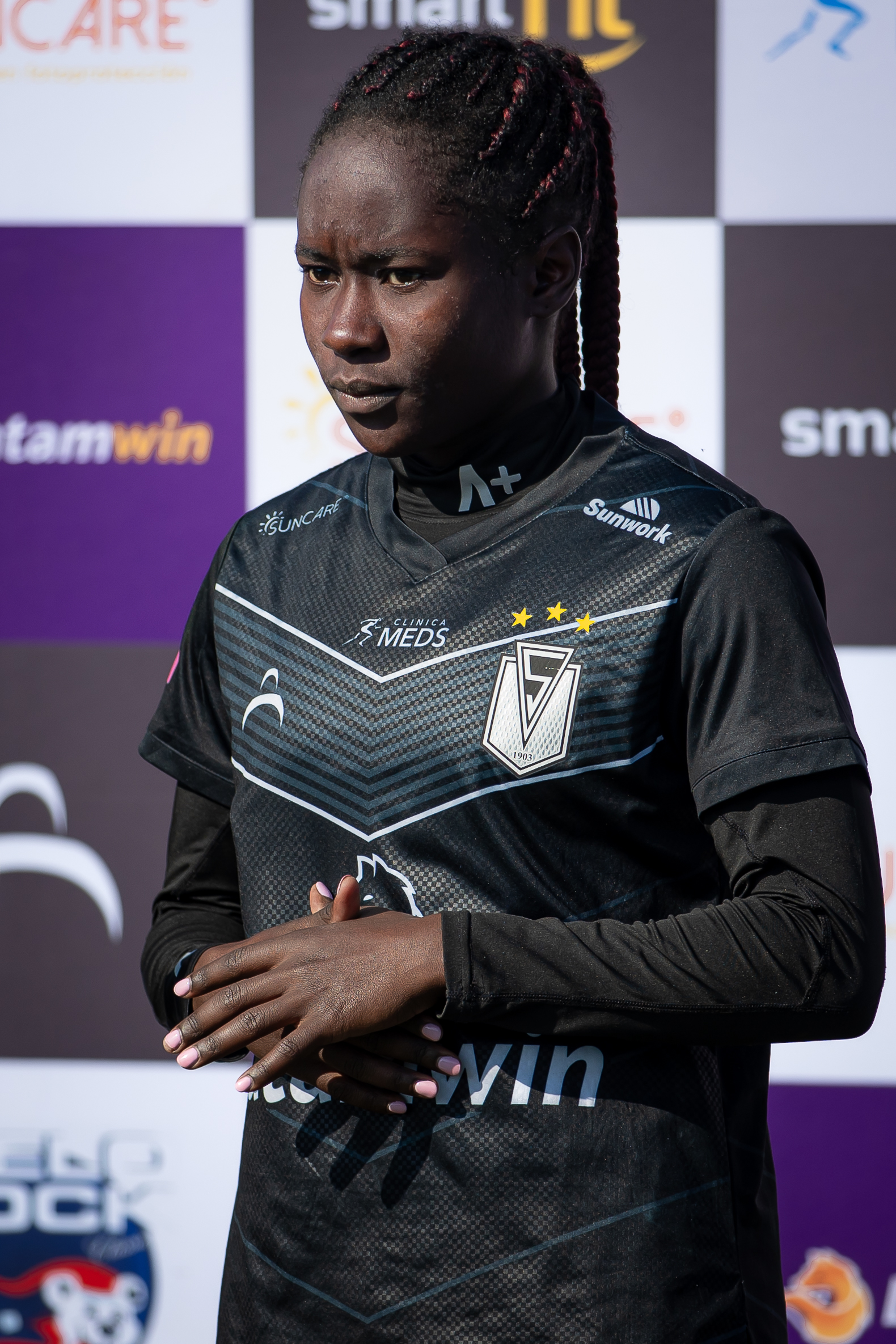
- Valencia with Santiago Morning in 2024

Personal information
- Full name: Mary Yalenny Valencia Riascos
- Date of birth: 8 February 2003 (age 23)
- Place of birth: López de Micay, Colombia
- Height: 1.61 m (5 ft 3 in)
- Position: Forward

Team information
- Current team: Colo-Colo

Senior career*
Years	Team	Apps	(Gls)
2018–2021	Santiago Wanderers		
2022–2024	Santiago Morning		
2025–	Colo-Colo		

International career
2022	Chile U20	6	(2)
2022–	Chile	3	(1)
- * Club domestic league appearances and goals

Mary Yalenny Valencia Riascos (born 8 February 2003) is a footballer who plays as a forward. She last played for Campeonato Nacional Fútbol Femenino club Colo-Colo. Born in Colombia, she plays for the Chile national team.

== Club career ==
Valencia started her career with Santiago Wanderers after standing out at school level.

In December 2021, she switched to Santiago Morning for the 2022 season in the Chilean top division. She left them at the end of the 2024 season.

In 2025, she moved to Colo-Colo.

== International career ==
=== Youth teams ===
During 2021, she was called up to training microcycles of the Chile national under-20 team despite the fact that she did not have the Chilean nationality at the time. Once she became a naturalized Chilean, she took part in both the 2022 South American Under-20 Championship, scoring a goal against Peru, and the 2022 South American Games.

=== Senior team ===
At senior level, she made her debut in a friendly against Venezuela on 26 June 2022. She later took part in the 2022 Copa América Femenina.

=== International goals ===
Scores and results list Uruguay's goal tally first

No.	Date	Venue	Opponent	Score	Result	Competition
1	18 April 2026	Estadio Centenario, Montevideo, Uruguay	Uruguay	1–1	3–1	2025–26 CONMEBOL Women's Nations League

== Personal life ==
Born in Colombia, Valencia came to Chile at the age of eleven alongside her mother and made her home in Valparaíso. In March 2022, she got the Chilean nationality by residence.

== Honours ==
Colo-Colo

- Primera División (2): 2025, 2026

Individual

- Primera División Top Goalscorer: 2025
- Primera División Ideal Team: 2025
- Primera División Crack Player: 2025
- Sports Journalists Circle of Chile (CPD) Best Female Footballer of the Year: 2025
- Premios América Responde - El País Best Female Player of Chile: 2025
