= Maryory Sánchez =

Peruvian footballer (born 1997)

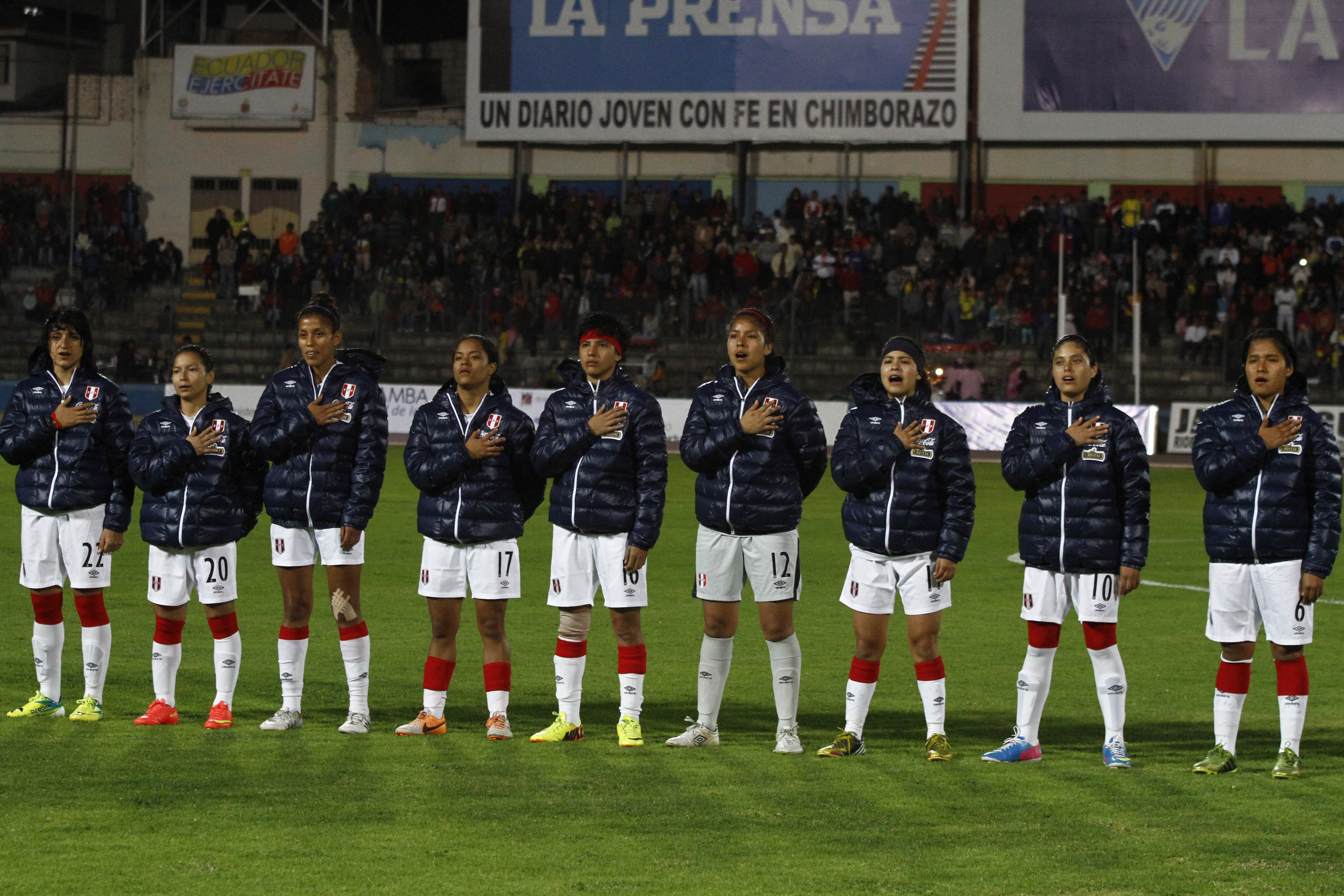
- Sánchez representing Peru at the 2014 Copa América Femenina

Personal information
- Full name: Maryory Estefanny Cristina Sánchez Panibra
- Date of birth: 7 April 1997 (age 29)
- Place of birth: Lima, Peru
- Height: 1.70 m (5 ft 7 in)
- Position: Goalkeeper

Team information
- Current team: Millonarios (on loan from Alianza Lima)

Senior career*
Years	Team	Apps	(Gls)
2014–2016	Universitario		
2017–2019	Sporting Cristal		
2017	→ Universitario (loan)		
2020	Deportivo Cali		
2021	Academia Sport		
2021-	Alianza Lima		
2022-	→ Millonarios (loan)		

International career^{‡}
2013	Peru U17		
2013–2017	Peru U20		
2014–	Peru	12	(0)
- * Club domestic league appearances and goals ‡ National team caps and goals as of 6 August 2019

Maryory Estefanny Cristina Sánchez Panibra (born 7 April 1997) is a Peruvian footballer who plays as a goalkeeper for Colombian club Millonarios F.C. and the Peru women's national team.

== Club career ==
In April 2021, Sánchez signed with Ecuadorian team Academia Sport JC.

In January 2022, Sánchez joined Colombian team Millonarios F.C. on loan from Club Alianza Lima.

== International career ==
Sánchez represented Peru at the 2013 South American U-17 Women's Championship and two South American U-20 Women's Championship editions (2014 and 2015). At senior level, she played two Copa América Femenina editions (2014 and 2018) and the 2019 Pan American Games.
