= Gabriela Bórquez =

Chilean footballer

Personal information
- Full name: Gabriela Fernanda Bórquez Vargas
- Date of birth: 27 December 1998 (age 27)
- Place of birth: Castro, Chile
- Height: 1.69 m (5 ft 7 in)
- Position: Goalkeeper

Team information
- Current team: Universitario

Senior career*
Years	Team	Apps	(Gls)
2015–2022	Santiago Morning		
2023–2024	Universidad de Chile		
2024	→ Millonarios (loan)	13	(0)
2025–	Universitario		

International career
2018	Chile U20		
- * Club domestic league appearances and goals

Gabriela Fernanda Bórquez Vargas (born 27 December 1998) is a Chilean footballer who plays as a goalkeeper for Peruvian club Universitario.

== Club career ==
Born in Castro, Chiloé, Bórquez spent seven seasons with Santiago Morning until 2022, winning three league titles and taking part in four editions of Copa Libertadores.

In 2023, Bórquez switched to Universidad de Chile on a two-year deal. The next season, she extended her contract until 2025 and was loaned out to Colombian Football League side Millonarios on a one-year deal. She came to the Colombian club alongside her compatriot Lesly Olivares. In the second half of 2024, she returned to Universidad de Chile.

In January 2025, Bórquez signed with Peruvian club Universitario.

== International career ==
From 2017 to 2018, Bórquez was a member of Chile U20 and represented them in the 2018 South American Championship.

At senior level, she trained with the Chile national team in 2017. Since then, she has been a permanent member of the squad.

== Personal life ==
She is nicknamed La Araña (The Spider).

She also has played basketball in his hometown for teams like Escolar Castro in the 2017 Copa Castro.
