= Emily Arias =

Ecuadorian footballer (born 2003)

Emily Rosa Arias Espinales
Personal information
- Date of birth: 16 March 2003 (age 23)
- Place of birth: Quito, Ecuador
- Height: 1.51 m (4 ft 11 in)
- Position: Forward

Team information
- Current team: América Mineiro

Senior career*
Years	Team	Apps	(Gls)
2019-2024	Independiente del Valle	12	(1)
2025-present	América Mineiro	12	(2)

International career
2020–2024	Ecuador U20	3	(0)
2020–	Ecuador	1	(2)
- * Club domestic league appearances and goals

Emily Rosa Arias Espinales is an Ecuadorian footballer who plays as a forward for América Mineiro and the Ecuador national team.

== International career ==
Arias joined Ecuador in 2020.

Played in 2022 South American Under-20 Women's Football Championship for Ecuador U20.

Arias played in the 2025 Copa América Femenina where she scored a goal against Uruguay.

== Career statistics ==
No.	Date	Venue	Opponent	Score	Result	Competition
1.	11 July 2025	Estadio Banco Guayaquil, Quito, Ecuador	Uruguay	2–2	2–2	2025 Copa América Femenina
2.	15 July 2025	Estadio Banco Guayaquil, Quito, Ecuador	Peru	1–0	3–1	2025 Copa América Femenina
