= Lesly Olivares =

Chilean footballer

Personal information
- Full name: Lesly Belén Olivares Riveros
- Date of birth: 17 September 2000 (age 26)
- Place of birth: Iquique, Chile
- Position: Attacking midfielder

Team information
- Current team: Universitario

Youth career
- 2014–2018: CODE Iquique

Senior career*
Years	Team	Apps	(Gls)
2019	CODE Iquique		
2020	Santiago Morning		
2020–2021	Deportes Iquique		
2022	Palestino		
2023	Deportes Antofagasta	17	(7)
2024–2025	Millonarios	17	(0)
2026	Fortaleza	14	(1)
2026–	Universitario	0	(0)

International career^{‡}
2020	Chile U20		
2021	Chile (football 7)		
2026–	Chile	2	(0)
- * Club domestic league appearances and goals as of 9 September 2026 ‡ National team caps and goals as of 8 March 2026

Lesly Belén Olivares Riveros (born 17 September 2000) is a Chilean footballer who plays as an attacking midfielder for Peruvian Primera División club Universitario.

== Club career ==
Born in Iquique, Chile, Olivares joined Colegio Deportivo Iquique, known as CDI or CODE Iquique, in 2014. In 2019, she began her senior career with them, the women's team of Deportes Iquique at the time. She after played for Santiago Morning (2020), Deportes Iquique (2020–21), Palestino (2022) and Deportes Antofagasta (2023) in his homeland.

In 2024, Olivares moved abroad and signed with Colombian Football League side Millonarios under Angie Vega, her coach in Deportes Antofagasta. She came to the Colombian club alongside her compatriot Gabriela Bórquez.

In February 2026, Olivares switched to Fortaleza. She moved to Peruvian Primera División club Universitario in September of the same year.

== International career ==
She represented Chile U20 in 2020.

At senior level, Olivares received her first call-up and made her debut with Chile in the friendly matches against Paraguay in March 2026.

=== International goals ===
Scores and results list Uruguay's goal tally first

No.	Date	Venue	Opponent	Score	Result	Competition
1	18 April 2026	Estadio Centenario, Montevideo, Uruguay	Uruguay	2–1	3–1	2025–26 CONMEBOL Women's Nations League

=== Football 7 ===
Olivares is also a seven-a-side football player who represented the Chile national team in the 2021 World Cup in Rio de Janeiro, Brazil.
