= Gisela Pino =

Chilean footballer (born 1992)

Personal information
- Full name: Gisela Francisca Pino Garrido
- Date of birth: 1 September 1992 (age 34)
- Height: 1.65 m (5 ft 5 in)
- Position: Midfielder

Senior career*
Years	Team	Apps	(Gls)
–2021	Colo-Colo		
2022–2023	Deportivo Cali		
2023	→ Universitario (loan)		
2024	Universidad de Chile		
2025	Universitario	31	(5)
2026–	Universidad de Chile		

International career^{‡}
2018	Chile	1	(0)
- * Club domestic league appearances and goals ‡ National team caps and goals as of 18 January 2019

Gisela Francisca Pino Garrido (born 1 September 1992) is a Chilean footballer who plays as a midfielder for Universidad de Chile.

== Career ==
After playing for Women's Championship club Colo-Colo, in 2022 she moved by first time outside Chile and joined Colombian club Deportivo Cali. In October 2023, she was loaned out to Peruvian club Universitario for the Copa Libertadores.

In 2024, Pino returned to her homeland and signed with Universidad de Chile. The next year, she rejoined Peruvian club Universitario for a season.

In January 2026, Pino returned to Universidad de Chile.
