= Margarita Collinao =

Chilean footballer (born 2003)

Personal information
- Full name: Margarita Almendra Collinao López
- Date of birth: 12 December 2003 (age 22)
- Place of birth: San Joaquín, Santiago, Chile
- Height: 1.55 m (5 ft 1 in)
- Position: Midfielder

Team information
- Current team: Unión Española

Youth career
- 2010–2015: Colo-Colo

Senior career*
Years	Team	Apps	(Gls)
2016–2024	Colo-Colo		
2025–	Unión Española		

International career^{‡}
2018	Chile U17		
2018	Chile	2	(0)
2022	Chile U20	3	(0)
- * Club domestic league appearances and goals ‡ National team caps and goals as of 12 June 2019

Margarita Almendra Collinao López (born 12 December 2003) is a Chilean footballer who plays as a midfielder for Unión Española.

== Club career ==
Collinao came to Colo-Colo youth system at the age of six and was promoted to the under-17 squad at the age of eleven. She left them at the end of the 2024 season.

In 2025, Collinao joined Unión Española.

== International career ==
At the age of twelve she was called up to the Chile senior team and has also been the team captain. However, she made her first two appearances in friendly matches against Costa Rica in June 2018.

In March 2018, she represented Chile at under-17 in the South American Championship as well as the under-20s in both the 2022 South American Championship and the 2022 South American Games.

== Personal life ==
She is of Mapuche descent and her surname means "red jaguar" in Mapudungún.

In August 2022, she was honored as Illustrious Daughter (Hija Ilustre) of her hometown, San Joaquín.
