= Michelle Olivares =

Chilean footballer (born 2002)

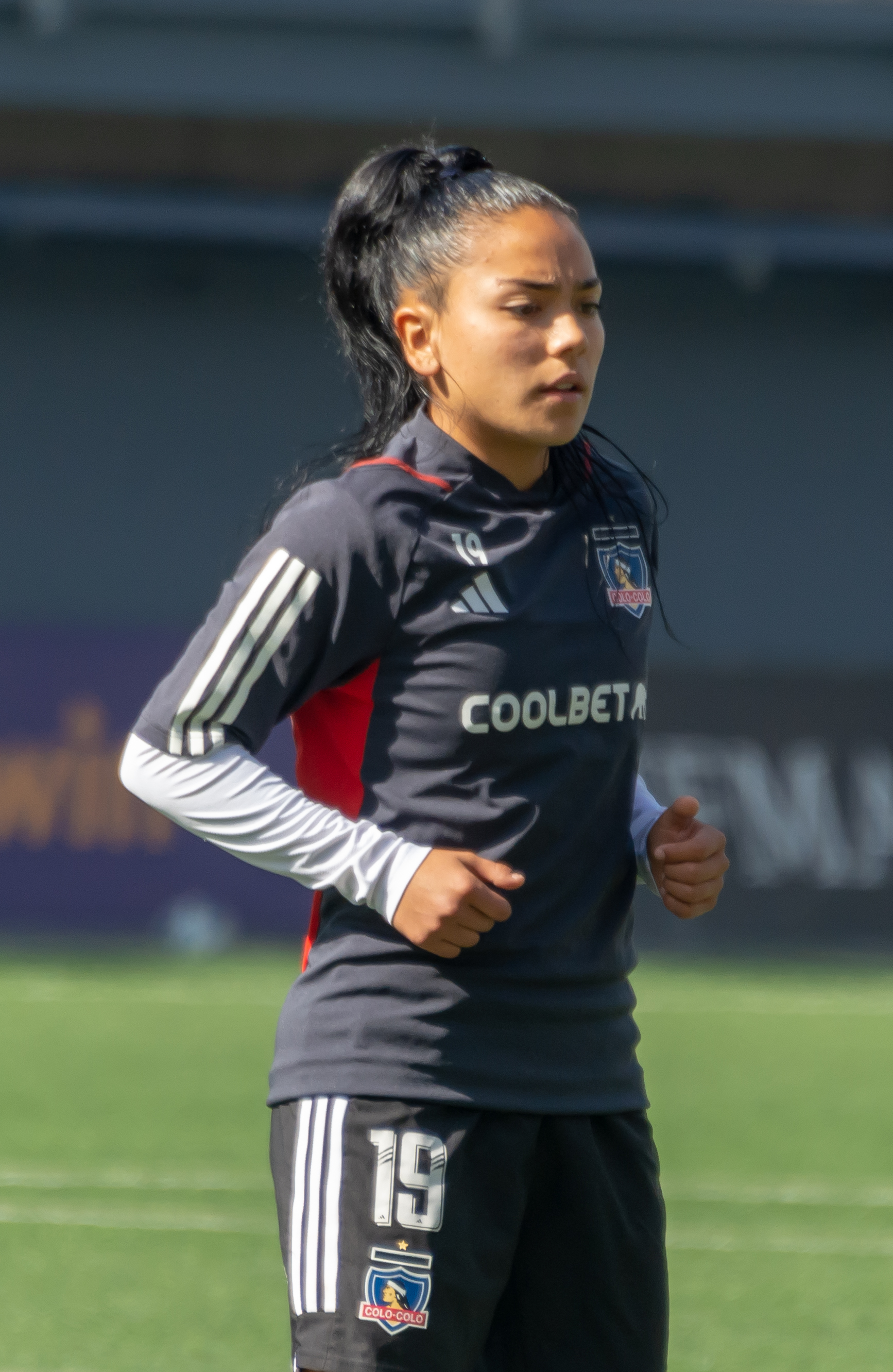
- Olivares with Colo-Colo in 2023

Personal information
- Full name: Michelle Eingel Olivares Acevedo
- Date of birth: 4 April 2002 (age 24)
- Place of birth: Santiago, Chile
- Height: 1.56 m (5 ft 1 in)
- Position: Right-back

Team information
- Current team: Colo-Colo
- Number: 19

Youth career
- 2015–2018: Universidad de Chile

Senior career*
Years	Team	Apps	(Gls)
2018–2021	Universidad de Chile		
2022–	Colo-Colo		

International career^{‡}
2018	Chile U17		(1)
2020–2022	Chile U20	8	
2022–	Chile	9	(0)
Medal record
Women's football
Representing Chile
Pan American Games
Silver medal – second place	2023 Santiago	Team
- * Club domestic league appearances and goals ‡ National team caps and goals as of 6 November 2023

Michelle Eingel Olivares Acevedo (born 4 April 2002) is a Chilean footballer who plays as a right-back for Colo-Colo and the Chile women's national team.

== Club career ==
A product of the Universidad de Chile youth system, she spent seven years with them and won the league title in 2021.

In 2022, she switched to Colo-Colo, winning the league title.

== International career ==
She represented Chile at under-17 level in the 2018 South American Championship. At under-20 level, she represented Chile in two editions of the South American Championship: 2020 and 2022. She also was the team captain in the 2022 South American Games.

At senior level, she made her debut in a 1–1 draw against Philippines on 12 November 2022 in Viña del Mar, Chile.

She represented Chile at the 2023 Pan American Games, where they won the silver medal.

== Personal life ==
As a student, Olivares attended the Sara Blinder Dargoltz High School and graduated as a business manager.

== Honours ==
Universidad de Chile

- Primera División (1): 2021

Colo-Colo

- Primera División (5): 2022, 2023, 2024, 2025, 2026

Chile

- Pan American Games Silver Medal: 2023

Individual

- Premios FutFem - Best Full-back: 2023
- Primera División Ideal Team (2): 2024, 2025

== International goals ==
No.	Date	Venue	Opponent	Score	Result	Competition
1.	30 November 2024	Estadio Elías Figueroa Brander, Valparaíso, Chile	Uruguay	1–0	1–0	Friendly
