= Mariana Benavides =

Costa Rican footballer (born 1994)

Personal information
- Full name: Mariana de los Ángeles Benavides Arguedas
- Date of birth: 26 December 1994 (age 31)
- Place of birth: Heredia, Costa Rica
- Height: 1.66 m (5 ft 5 1/2 in)
- Position: Defender

Team information
- Current team: Millonarios

Senior career*
Years	Team	Apps	(Gls)
-2022	CS Herediano		
2023	Saprissa		
2024-	Millonarios		

International career^{‡}
2011	Costa Rica U20	4	(0)
2013–	Costa Rica	12	(4)
Medal record
Women's football
Representing Costa Rica
Pan American Games
Bronze medal – third place	2019 Lima	Team
- * Club domestic league appearances and goals ‡ National team caps and goals as of 16:55, 18 June 2015 (UTC)

Mariana de los Ángeles Benavides Arguedas (born 26 December 1994) is a Costa Rican footballer who plays as a defender for Millonarios.

== International goals ==
No.	Date	Venue	Opponent	Score	Result	Competition
1.	17 February 2022	Estadio Nacional, San José, Costa Rica	Saint Kitts and Nevis	1–0	7–0	2022 CONCACAF W Championship qualification
2.	17 February 2022	Estadio Nacional, San José, Costa Rica	Saint Kitts and Nevis	4–0	7–0	2022 CONCACAF W Championship qualification
3.	10 April 2026	Estadio Alejandro Morera Soto, Alajuela, Costa Rica	Cayman Islands	3–0	21–0	2026 CONCACAF W Championship qualification
4.	10 April 2026	Estadio Alejandro Morera Soto, Alajuela, Costa Rica	Cayman Islands	7–0	21–0	2026 CONCACAF W Championship qualification

== Honours ==
Costa Rica

Winner

- Central American Games: 2013

== See also ==
- List of women's footballers with 100 or more international caps
