= Justine Cuadra =

Ecuadorian footballer (born 1998)

Personal information
- Full name: Justine Ayli Cuadra Gordon
- Date of birth: 17 August 1998 (age 28)
- Place of birth: Guayaquil, Ecuador
- Height: 1.62 m (5 ft 4 in)
- Positions: Midfielder; defender

Team information
- Current team: Deportivo Cuenca
- Number: 4

Senior career*
Years	Team	Apps	(Gls)
2014–2016	Alianza		
2016–2017	Talleres Emanuel		
2017	Alianza		
2017–2018	Talleres Emanuel		
2018	Carneras UPS	7	(0)
2018–2019	Alianza		
2019	Guayaquil City	2	(0)
2019	Deportivo Cuenca	19	(1)
2020	Colo-Colo		
2021–	Deportivo Cuenca	14	(1)

International career
	Ecuador	2+	(0+)
- * Club domestic league appearances and goals as of 23 August 2021.

Justine Ayli Cuadra Gordon (born 17 August 1998) is an Ecuadorian footballer who plays as a midfielder for Deportivo Cuenca and the Ecuador women's national team.

== Club career ==
Cuadra has played for Alianza, Talleres Emanuel, Carneras UPS, Guayaquil City and Deportivo Cuenca in Ecuador and for Colo-Colo in Chile.

== International career ==
Cuadra capped for Ecuador at senior level during the 2018 Copa América Femenina.

=== International goals ===
Scores and results list Ecuador's goal tally first

No.	Date	Venue	Opponent	Score	Result	Competition
1	5 June 2026	Estadio Nacional Julio Martínez Prádanos, Santiago, Chile	Chile	1–0	2–1	2025–26 CONMEBOL Women's Nations League
