= Jessy Caicedo =

Ecuadorian footballer (born 1999)

Personal information
- Full name: Jessy Teotista Caicedo Ayovi
- Date of birth: 4 July 1999 (age 27)
- Place of birth: Telembí, Esmeraldas, Ecuador
- Positions: Left-back; striker

Team information
- Current team: Ñañas
- Number: 2

Youth career
- Leones del Norte

Senior career*
Years	Team	Apps	(Gls)
2019	Universidad Católica		
2020–	Ñañas	26	(1)

International career^{‡}
2021–	Ecuador	2	(0)
- * Club domestic league appearances and goals as of 27 April 2022 ‡ National team caps and goals as of 27 April 2022

Jessy Teotista Caicedo Ayovi (born 4 July 1999) is an Ecuadorian footballer who plays as a defender for Superliga Femenina club Club Ñañas and the Ecuador women's national team.

== Early life ==
Caicedo grew up in Telembí, a rural parish of Eloy Alfaro Canton in Esmeraldas Province. She began playing football aged eight. Prior to turning professional, Caicedo trained with and appeared in exhibition matches for men's team Club Deportivo Leones del Norte.

== Club career ==
=== Universidad Católica ===
On 28 April 2019, Caicedo debuted for Superliga Femenina side C.D. Universidad Católica del Ecuador as a forward in a 1–0 defeat to Club Ñañas. She ended the season as the team's top scorer.

=== Club Ñañas ===
In early 2020, Caicedo joined Club Ñañas where coach Francisco Ramírez began fielding her as a defender. On 22 March 2021, she was named as both the best player and best left-back of the Superliga Femenina 2020 season.

On 4 July 2021, Caicedo set a new record for the fastest goal in Superliga Femenina. She scored 12 seconds into a 2–1 win over Liga de Quito, surpassing teammate Carina Caicedo's previous record by 11 seconds.

== International career ==
On 21 February 2021, Caicedo earned her first cap for Ecuador as a half-time substitute in a 3–0 friendly victory over Bolivia at Estadio Olímpico Atahualpa. She made her starting debut on 24 October the same year, in a 4–1 friendly loss to Venezuela at Estadio Monumental Banco Pichincha.
