= Millonarios F.C. (women) =

Millonarios
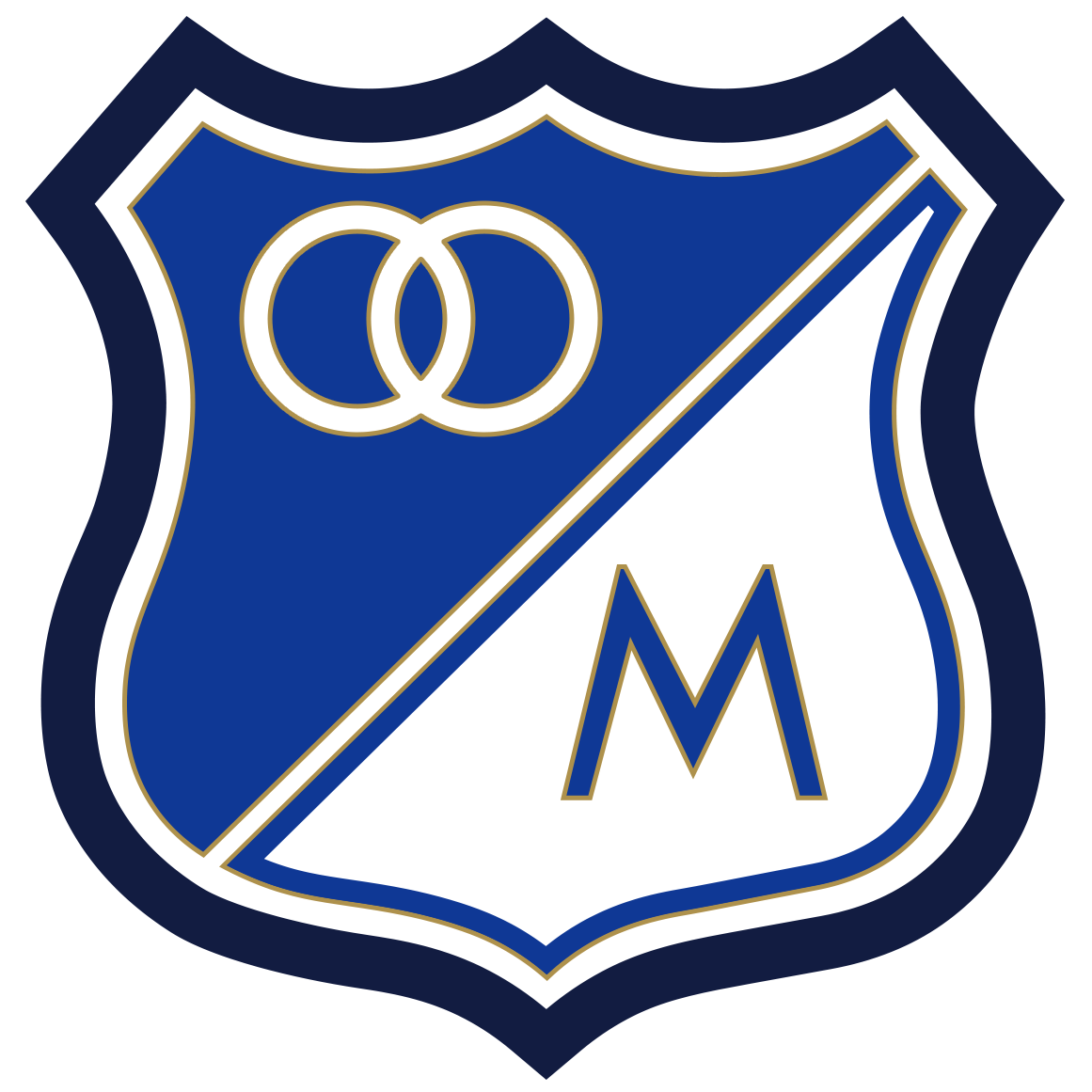
- Full name: Millonarios Fútbol Club Femenino
- Nickname: Las embajadoras (The Ambassadors)
- Founded: 5 May 2018; 8 years ago
- Ground: Nemesio Camacho
- Capacity: 39,512
- Chairman: Enrique Camacho
- Manager: Angie Vega
- League: Colombian Women's Football League
- 2025: Women's League, 8th of 16
- Website: https://millonarios.com.co/
Home colours	Away colours

Millonarios Fútbol Club Femenino, commonly known as Millonarios, is a professional women's football club based in Bogotá, Colombia. They are the women's football section of Millonarios and they currently play in the Colombian Women's Football League, the top level women's football league in Colombia.

The club was officially founded on 9 May 2018 in alliance with Sergio Arboleda University. It debuted in the Colombian Women's league in the 2019 season.

== History ==
The women's section of Millonarios dates back to the 1970s. They sporadically participated in friendly tournaments until the beginning of the 2000s. Formally in 2016, it started its minor divisions. Later in August 2017, Sergio Arboleda University joined the project by raising a sports alliance to reach professionalism in 2019.

The club begins its training on 6 June 2018, with the preselection of 23 players. The team was presented on 12 December, after six months of structuring, where, in alliance with the university, an agreement was formed to enrich the female squad. Subsequently, the participation of the club in the Colombian Women's League was formalized. Millonarios' first selection was Fabiola Herrera from her native Peru.

== Players ==
=== Current squad ===
As of 4 August 2025

Note: Flags indicate national team as defined under FIFA eligibility rules; some limited exceptions apply. Players may hold more than one non-FIFA nationality.

No.	Pos.	Nation	Player
1	GK	COL	Michell Lugo
3	DF	COL	Isabella Amado
4	DF	COL	Laura Bolaño
6	MF	CHI	Lesly Olivares
7	FW	COL	Angie Castañeda
8	MF	COL	Juana Ortegón
10	FW	COL	Daniela Castellanos
11	MF	CRC	Katherine Alvarado
12	GK	COL	Daniela Gamboa
13	DF	COL	María Alejandra Leal
14	DF	COL	María Fernanda Gutiérrez
15	FW	COL	Tatiana Ariza
16	FW	COL	Lina Gómez
17	DF	COL	Laura Tamayo

No.	Pos.	Nation	Player
19	FW	COL	Paula Quiroga
21	MF	COL	Nancy Madrid
22	DF	COL	María José Torres
23	DF	COL	María Fernanda Viáfara
25	FW	COL	Rocío Olaya
26	DF	CRC	Mariana Benavides
30	GK	COL	Luna Reyes
—	DF	COL	Nicoll Cárdenas
—	DF	COL	Shaira Collazos
—	MF	COL	María Agudelo
—	MF	COL	Sofía Clavijo
—	FW	CHI	Melany Letelier
—	FW	COL	Sara Malaver
—	FW	CRC	Sofía Varela
