= Pamela González =

Uruguayan footballer (born 1995)

Personal information
- Full name: Cinthia Pamela González Medina
- Date of birth: 28 September 1995 (age 31)
- Place of birth: Paysandú, Uruguay
- Height: 1.68 m (5 ft 6 in)
- Position: Midfielder

Team information
- Current team: Racing Power
- Number: 6

Senior career*
Years	Team	Apps	(Gls)
2011–2014	Colón	54	(58)
2015	Nacional Montevideo	9	(13)
2015–2020	Málaga	49+	(3+)
2020–2023	Granada	69	(8)
2023–2025	Sevilla	52	(6)
2025–	Racing Power	10	(1)

International career^{‡}
2019–	Uruguay	34	(7)
- * Club domestic league appearances and goals as of 13 March 2026 ‡ National team caps and goals as of 13 March 2026

Cinthia Pamela González Medina (born 28 August 1995) is a Uruguayan professional footballer who plays as a central midfielder for Campeonato Nacional Feminino club Racing Power and the Uruguay national team.

== Club career ==
González previously played in the Campeonato Uruguayo for Nacional Montevideo and Colón.

== International career ==
González represented Uruguay in the 2014 and 2018 editions of the Copa América.

=== International goals ===
Scores and results list Uruguay's goal tally first

No.	Date	Venue	Opponent	Score	Result	Competition
1	15 September 2014	Estadio Olímpico de Riobamba, Riobamba, Ecuador	Peru	2–1	2–1	2014 Copa América Femenina
2	19 September 2014	Estadio La Cocha, Latacunga, Ecuador	Ecuador	1–0	2–1	2014 Copa América Femenina
3	18 July 2022	Estadio Centenario, Armenia, Colombia	Peru	1–0	6–0	2022 Copa América Femenina
4	18 July 2022	Estadio Centenario, Armenia, Colombia	Peru	5–0	6–0	2022 Copa América Femenina
5	3 June 2024	Estadio Centenario, Montevideo, Uruguay	Russia	1–1	2–1	Friendly
6	30 May 2025	Estadio Universitario BUAP, Puebla, Mexico	Mexico	2–2	2–2	Friendly
7	11 July 2025	Estadio Banco Guayaquil, Quito, Ecuador	Ecuador	2–0	2–2	2025 Copa América Femenina
8	24 July 2025	Estadio Gonzalo Pozo Ripalda, Quito, Ecuador	Chile	1–0	3–0	2025 Copa América Femenina
9	10 April 2026	Estadio Garcilaso, Cusco, Peru	Peru	1–0	1–2	2025–26 CONMEBOL Women's Nations League
10	18 April 2026	Estadio Centenario, Montevideo, Uruguay	Chile	1–0	1–3	2025–26 CONMEBOL Women's Nations League
11	9 June 2026	Estadio Centenario, Montevideo, Uruguay	Venezuela	1–0	1–1	2025–26 CONMEBOL Women's Nations League

== Titles ==
- Uruguayan Championship (2): 2013, 2014.
