= Vanina Preininger =

Argentine footballer (born 1996)

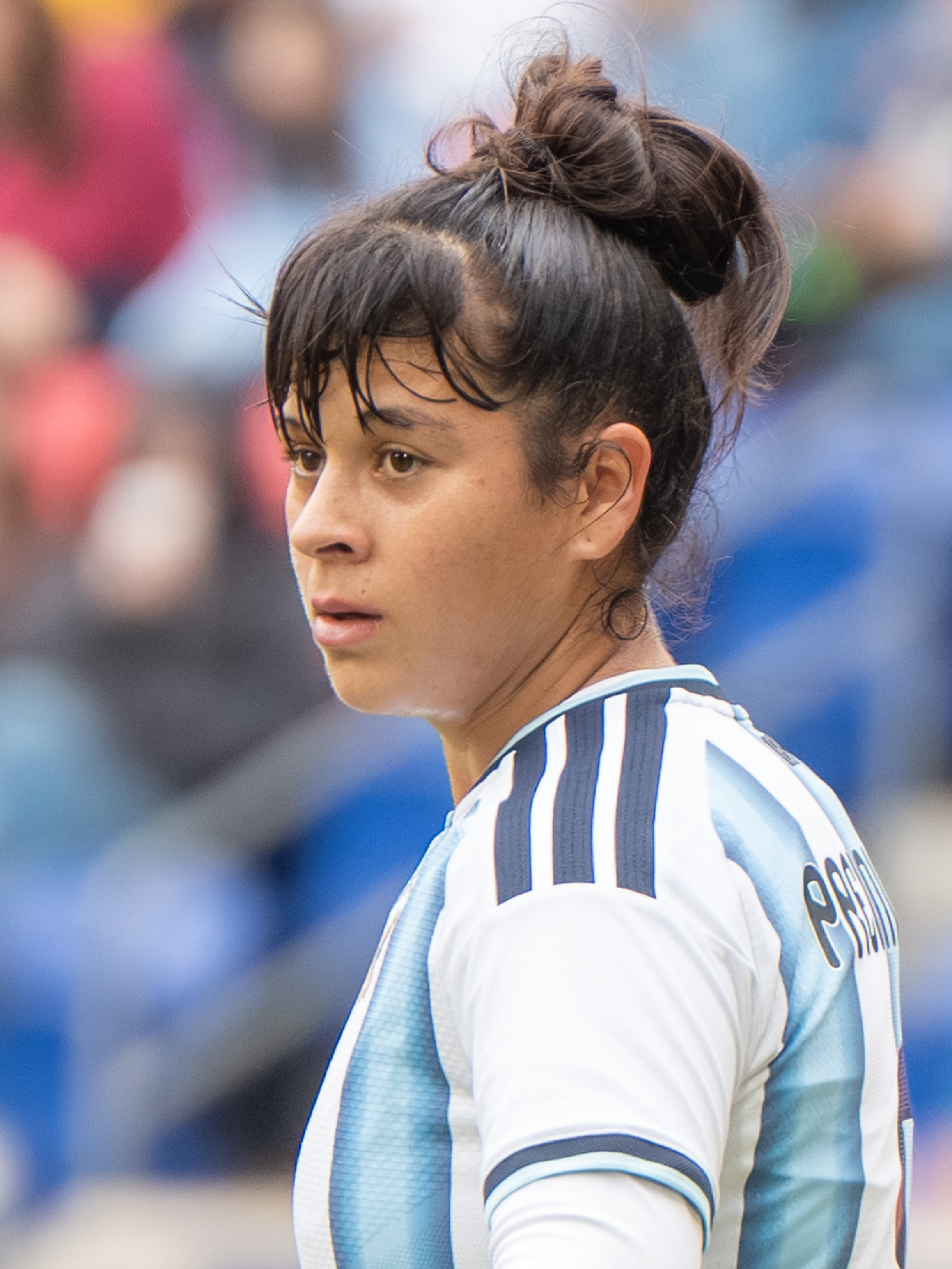
- Preininger in 2026

Personal information
- Full name: Vanina Ailen Preininger
- Date of birth: 26 September 1996 (age 30)
- Place of birth: Buenos Aires, Argentina
- Height: 1.65 m (5 ft 5 in)
- Position: Midfielder

Team information
- Current team: São Paulo
- Number: 26

Senior career*
Years	Team	Apps	(Gls)
2010–2014	San Lorenzo		
2014–2017	River Plate		
2017–2020	San Lorenzo		
2020–2022	UAI Urquiza		
2022–2024	Boca Juniors		
2025	San Lorenzo		
2026–	São Paulo		

International career^{‡}
- Argentina U17
- Argentina U20
2021–	Argentina	29	(0)
Medal record
Women's football
Representing Argentina
Copa América Femenina
Third place	2025 Ecuador
- * Club domestic league appearances and goals as of 17 February 2024 ‡ National team caps and goals as of 18 April 2026

Vanina Ailen Preininger (born 26 September 1996) is an Argentine professional footballer and former futsal player who plays as a midfielder for Campeonato Brasileiro Feminino A1 club São Paulo and the Argentina women's national team.

== Early life ==
Preininger took her first steps at the "Jóvenes Deportistas" club in Villa Lugano, playing with boys until a teacher took her to try out for San Lorenzo. However, due to school, she dropped out.

== Club career ==
=== San Lorenzo ===
Preininger returned to Las Cuervas after a while and began playing in the girls' soccer school. In 2010, at just 13 years old, she trained with the first team. Also in that year, Preininger also had several minutes with the first team until 2014, She also played futsal for the Blaugrana team until that year, winning several titles. In 2015, she was part of the Kimberley club.

=== River Plate ===
In 2014, Preininger was part of Las Millonarias. Much in the veins of her first stint in San Lorenzo, she also played futsal in addition to 11-a-side football.

=== Return to San Lorenzo ===
In early 2017, Preininger returned to San Lorenzo for her second stint.

=== UAI Urquiza ===
On 5 October 2020, Preininger was officially announced as a reinforcement for the Furgonero.

=== Boca Juniors ===
On 22 January 2022, the Xeneize club announced Preininger as a reinforcement for the season. In September 2022, her club was crowned champion of the Campeonato Femenino and reached the finals of the Copa Libertadores.

=== Second return to San Lorenzo ===
In early 2025, Preininger returned to San Lorenzo once again.

== International career ==
In 2013, Preininger played in the South American Under-17 Championship and in 2015 in the Under-20 Championship. She made her senior debut for Argentina on 17 April 2021, in a 3–1 friendly loss against Brazil.

In June 2025, Preininger was named to the senior national team for the 2025 Copa América Femenina.

== Career statistics ==
=== International ===
As of match played 14 April 2026

Appearances and goals by national team and year
National team	Year	Apps	Goals
Argentina	2021	1	0
Argentina	2022	1	0
Argentina	2024	8	0
Argentina	2025	14	0
Argentina	2026	5	0
Total		29	0

== Honours ==
=== Clubs ===
Boca Juniors

- Primera División A: 2022, 2023, Ap. 2024
- Copa de la Liga: 2023
- Copa Federal: 2023
