= Virginia Gómez =

Argentine footballer

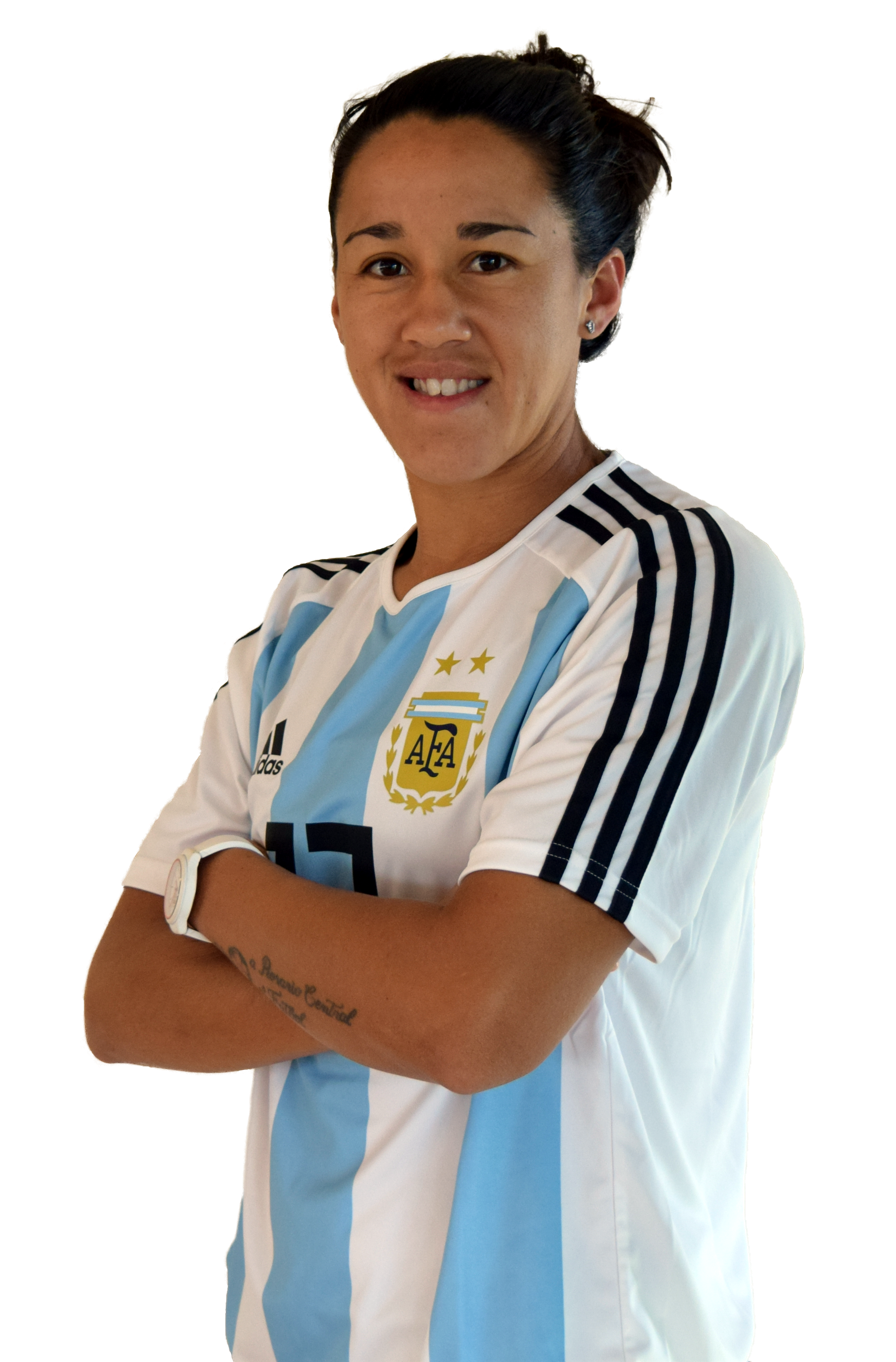

Personal information
- Date of birth: 26 February 1991 (age 35)
- Place of birth: Rosario, Argentina
- Height: 1.57 m (5 ft 2 in)
- Positions: Right back; midfielder

Team information
- Current team: San Lorenzo de Akmagro
- Number: 13

Senior career*
Years	Team	Apps	(Gls)
- Rosario Central
2022–	San Lorenzo de Almagro		

International career^{‡}
2008	Argentina U20	3	(0)
2019–	Argentina	2	(0)
Medal record
Women's football
Representing Argentina
Copa América Femenina
Bronze medal – third place	2025 Ecuador
Pan American Games
Silver medal – second place	2019 Lima	Team
- * Club domestic league appearances and goals ‡ National team caps and goals as of 6 March 2019

Virginia Gómez (born 26 February 1991) is an Argentine footballer who plays as a right back for San Lorenzo de Almagro and the Argentina women's national team.

== International career ==
Gómez represented Argentina at the 2008 FIFA U-20 Women's World Cup. At senior level, she made her debut on 28 February 2019 in a 0–5 friendly loss against South Korea.
