= Fátima Barone =

Uruguayan footballer (born 1999)

Personal information
- Full name: Maria Fátima Barone Mora
- Date of birth: 17 September 1999 (age 27)
- Position: Centre back

Team information
- Current team: Querétaro
- Number: 6

Youth career
- 2017: Nacional

Senior career*
Years	Team	Apps	(Gls)
2017–2021	Nacional	16	(3)
2022–2023	Wanderers		
2024	Platense		
2025	Belgrano		
2026–	Querétaro	1	(1)

International career^{‡}
2017–2018	Uruguay U20	2+	
2019–	Uruguay	1	(0)
- * Club domestic league appearances and goals as of 5 February 2026 ‡ National team caps and goals as of 6 October 2019

Maria Fátima Barone Mora (born 17 September 1999), known as Fátima Barone, is a Uruguayan footballer who plays as a centre back for Querétaro Fútbol Club Femenil and the Uruguay women's national team. She has previously played field hockey in Argentina.

== International career ==
Barone made her senior debut for Uruguay on 6 October 2019.

== Personal life ==
Barone's father, Deivis Barone, is a former footballer. Her brother, Faustino Barone, is also a footballer, and currently plays for River Plate Montevideo.
