= Daiana Farías =

Uruguayan footballer (born 1999)

Personal information
- Full name: Daiana Yasmín Farías Aldacour
- Date of birth: 26 January 1999 (age 27)
- Place of birth: Montevideo, Uruguay
- Height: 1.70 m (5 ft 7 in)
- Positions: Centre-back; defensive midfielder

Team information
- Current team: Cruzeiro
- Number: 3

Youth career
- 2014–2015: Colón
- 2017–2018: Peñarol

Senior career*
Years	Team	Apps	(Gls)
2014–2015	Colón	3	(0)
2015–2019	Peñarol	68	(12)
2020	Paio Pires	5	(3)
2020–2021	Racing Santander	12	(1)
2021–2023	Racing Power	44	(36)
2023	Peñarol	0	(0)
2024–	Cruzeiro	2	(0)

International career^{‡}
2018–	Uruguay	13	(0)
- * Club domestic league appearances and goals as of 29 March 2024 ‡ National team caps and goals as of 21 February 2023

Daiana Yasmín Farías Aldacour (born 26 January 1999) is a Uruguayan professional footballer who plays as a centre-back for Campeonato Brasileiro Série A1 club Cruzeiro and the Uruguay women's national team.

== International goals ==
No.	Date	Venue	Opponent	Score	Result	Competition
1.	10 April 2023	Estadio Alfredo Victor Viera, Montevideo, Uruguay	Peru	3–0	3–0	Friendly
