= Renata Masciarelli =

Argentine footballer (born 1997)

Personal information
- Full name: Renata Masciarelli Orozco
- Date of birth: 23 January 1997 (age 29)
- Place of birth: Guadalajara, Jalisco, Mexico
- Height: 1.68 m (5 ft 6 in)
- Position: Goalkeeper

Team information
- Current team: Puebla
- Number: 1

College career
Years	Team	Apps	(Gls)
2015	Idaho State Bengals	5	(0)
2018	Duquesne Dukes	1	(0)

Senior career*
Years	Team	Apps	(Gls)
2019–2022	América	53	(0)
2023	Pachuca	7	(0)
2023–2025	Juárez	36	(0)
2025–2026	Fundación Albacete	0	(0)
2026–	Puebla	0	(0)

International career^{‡}
2013–2014	Mexico U17		
2025–	Argentina	1	(0)
Medal record
Women's football
Representing Argentina
Copa América Femenina
Bronze medal – third place	2025 Ecuador
- * Club domestic league appearances and goals as of 4 June 2023 ‡ National team caps and goals as of 8 April 2025

Renata Masciarelli Orozco (born 23 January 1997) is a professional footballer who plays as a goalkeeper for Liga MX Femenil side Puebla. Born in Mexico, she plays for the Argentina national team.

== Early life and education ==
Masciarelli was born on 23 January 1997 in Guadalajara, Jalisco to Gerardo Masciarelli Command and Adriana Orozco Aviña. She attended the Universidad del Valle de Atemajac.

== Club career ==
In 2019, she started her club career in América. In 2023, she was transferred to Pachuca. In 2023, she joined to Juárez.

== International career ==
Born in Mexico, Masciarelli is of Argentine descent through her father. She was part of the Mexico women's national under-17 team who reached the quarter finals of the 2014 FIFA U-17 Women's World Cup.

In late November 2024, Masciarelli was called up by the Argentina women's national team. She made her debut on 8 April 2025 as an 80th-minute substitution in a 0–1 away friendly win over Canada.

== Personal life ==
Masciarelli's uncle, Roberto Aníbal Masciarelli, is an Argentine former footballer of Italian descent who played for Atlas F.C., Club Puebla, Leones Negros UdeG and Deportivo Toluca F.C.
