= Sofía Domínguez =

Argentine footballer (born 2005)

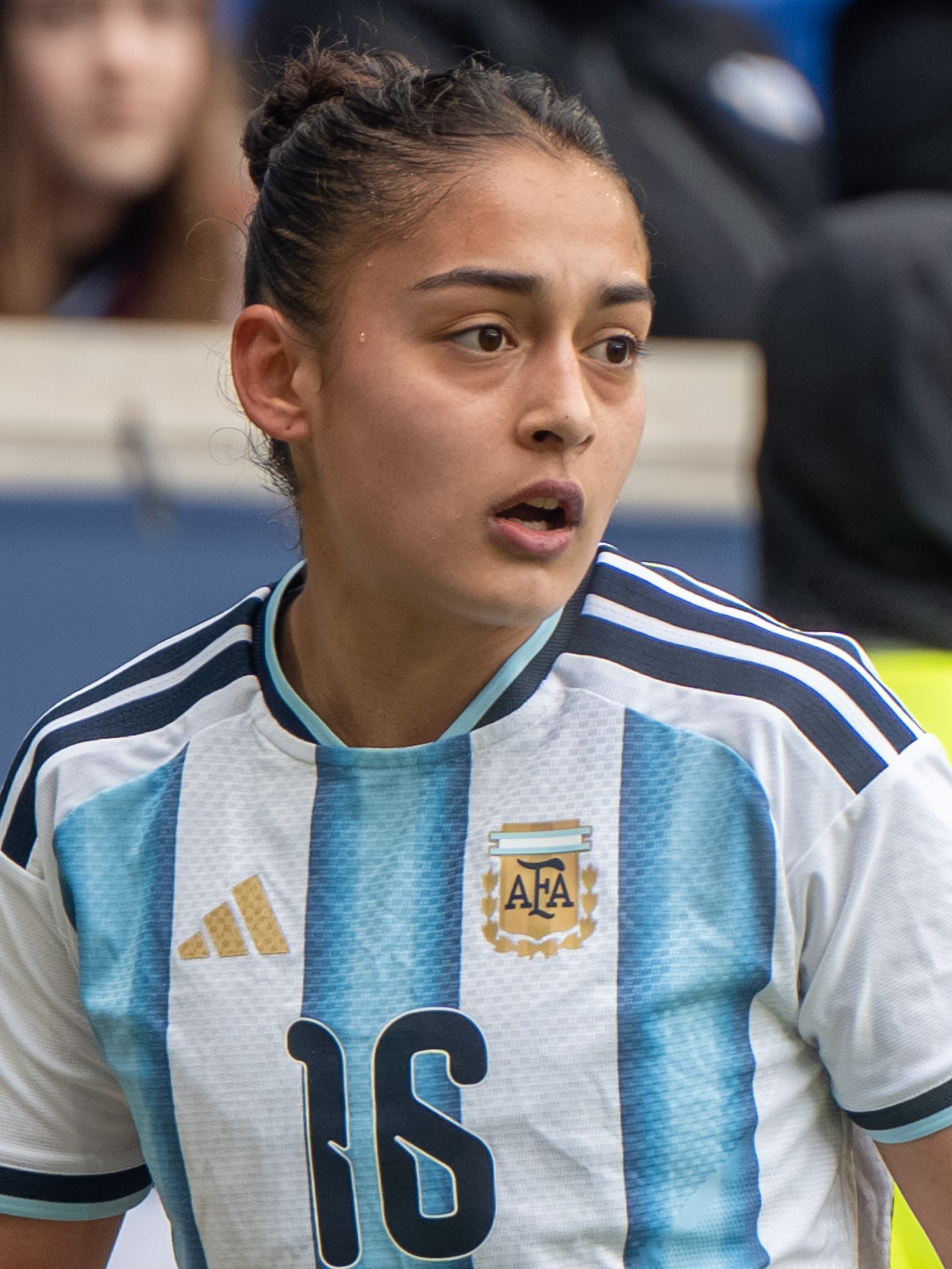
- Dominguez with Argentina in 2026

Personal information
- Full name: Evelyn Sofía Domínguez Acuña
- Date of birth: 16 December 2005 (age 20)
- Place of birth: Buenos Aires, Argentina
- Height: 1.56 m (5 ft 1 in)
- Position: Midfielder

Youth career
- 2018–2021: River Plate

Senior career*
| Years | Team | Apps | (Gls) |
| 2021–2025 | River Plate | | |
| 2025 | Newell's Old Boys | 15+ | (1+) |
| 2025–2026 | FC Basel | 25+ | (1) |
| 2026– | Deportivo de A Coruña | 1 | (0) |

International career^{‡}
| 2022 | Argentina U17 | | |
| 2023–2024 | Argentina U20 | | |
| 2024– | Argentina | 25 | (0) |
Medal record
Women's football
Representing Argentina
Copa América Femenina
| Third place | 2025 Ecuador |
- * Club domestic league appearances and goals as of 17 February 2024 ‡ National team caps and goals as of 18 April 2026

Evelyn Sofía Domínguez Acuña (born 16 December 2005) is an Argentine professional footballer who plays as a midfielder for Deportivo de A Coruña and the Argentina women's national team.

== Club career ==
=== Early career ===
Domínguez started playing football at the age of 7 in different teams in her hometown, Merlo, with boys in the clubs "El Ceibo" and "Los Verdes de Rivadavia", and in girls' clubs "1 de mayo" and "Santa Teresita". At the age of 11 she joined River Plate and played futsal. Her first experience in 11-a-side football was at Platense, where she played for Calamar's U-14 team in 2017. In that same year she was crowned champion of the Conmebol Development League.

=== River Plate ===
In 2018, Domínguez joined River Plate, and that same year she was crowned champion of the U-14 Development League, winning the final against Liga del Valle de Chubut. In 2019, she repeated the title and became a two-time champion of the same tournament in the aforementioned edition.

Domínguez became part of "la banda"'s first team in the 2019/2020 season. On 27 March 2021, she made her senior debut with the "Millonarias" in the 12–0 victory over Excursionistas, where she scored a goal. In 2022, she was crowned champion of the CONMEBOL U-16 Development League, this being her fourth title in this league (the first 3 were in the U-14 category).

=== Newell's Old Boys ===
For the 2025 season, Domínguez joined Newell's Old Boys.

== International career ==
Domínguez was called up to the U-17 national team on 21 February 2022 to compete in the 2022 South American Women's Championship in Uruguay. In September 2022 she was called up to the U-20 national team.

In June 2025, Domínguez was named to the senior national team for the 2025 Copa América Femenina.

== Career statistics ==
=== International ===
As of match played 14 April 2026

Appearances and goals by national team and year
| National team | Year | Apps | Goals |
|---|---|---|---|
| Argentina | 2024 | 6 | 0 |
| Argentina | 2025 | 14 | 0 |
| Argentina | 2026 | 5 | 0 |
| Total | | 25 | 0 |

== Personal life ==
Domínguez is a Boca Juniors fan. She confesses that her dreams are to play abroad and be able to help her family financially.

== Honors and awards ==
=== Clubs ===
River Plate

- Copa Federal: 2022

Newell's Old Boys

- Primera División A: Apertura 2025
- Copa Federal: 2024
