= Savannah Madden =

Serbian footballer

Personal information
- Date of birth: 2 February 1999 (age 27)
- Place of birth: San Diego, California, United States
- Height: 1.70 m (5 ft 7 in)
- Position: Goalkeeper

Team information
- Current team: Vittsjö
- Number: 1

Youth career
- 2019: San Diego Surf

College career
| Years | Team | Apps | (Gls) |
| 2018–2023 | Texas Longhorns | 67 | (0) |

Senior career*
| Years | Team | Apps | (Gls) |
| 2023–2024 | Houston Dash | 0 | (0) |
| 2024– | Vittsjö | 11 | (0) |

International career^{‡}
| 2014–2016 | United States U17 | 0 | (0) |
| 2024– | Peru | 6 | (0) |
- * Club domestic league appearances and goals as of 5 August 2025 ‡ National team caps and goals as of 5 August 2025

Savannah Madden (born 2 February 1999) is a professional association footballer who plays as a goalkeeper for Damallsvenskan club Vittsjö GIK. Born in the United States, she represents Peru internationally.

== Early life ==
Madden was born on 2 February 1999 in San Diego, California to parents Jeff and Aurora Madden. She has two sisters, Jenni and Clare, as well as several family members who have been involved in college sports.

Madden attended Scripps Ranch High School before attending the University of Texas at Austin (UT Austin) as a graduate student. She chose UT Austin over several other elite schools, including Georgetown College, Stanford University, the University of California, Los Angeles (UCLA), and the University of Southern California (USC).

== Youth and college career ==
In the summer of 2019, Madden played for San Diego Surf in the Women's Premier Soccer League (WPSL). She made eight appearances, including five starts.

At college, Madden played for the Texas Longhorns, where she played 67 games from 2018 until 2023 (including starting and playing all but 19 minutes in 2022).

== Club career ==
Madden began her career at National Women's Soccer League (NWSL) club Houston Dash. However, she did not play any NWSL games for the club.

In 2024, Madden moved to Sweden and signed for Damallsvenskan club Vittsjö GIK.

== International career ==
In December 2014, Madden attended the USA Goalkeeper National Camp. In September 2015, she was called up for the United States under-17 national team camp in Carson, California.

Madden was part of Peru's 23-player squad for the 2025 Copa América Femenina in Quito, Ecuador.
