= Nayadet López =

Chilean footballer (born 1994)

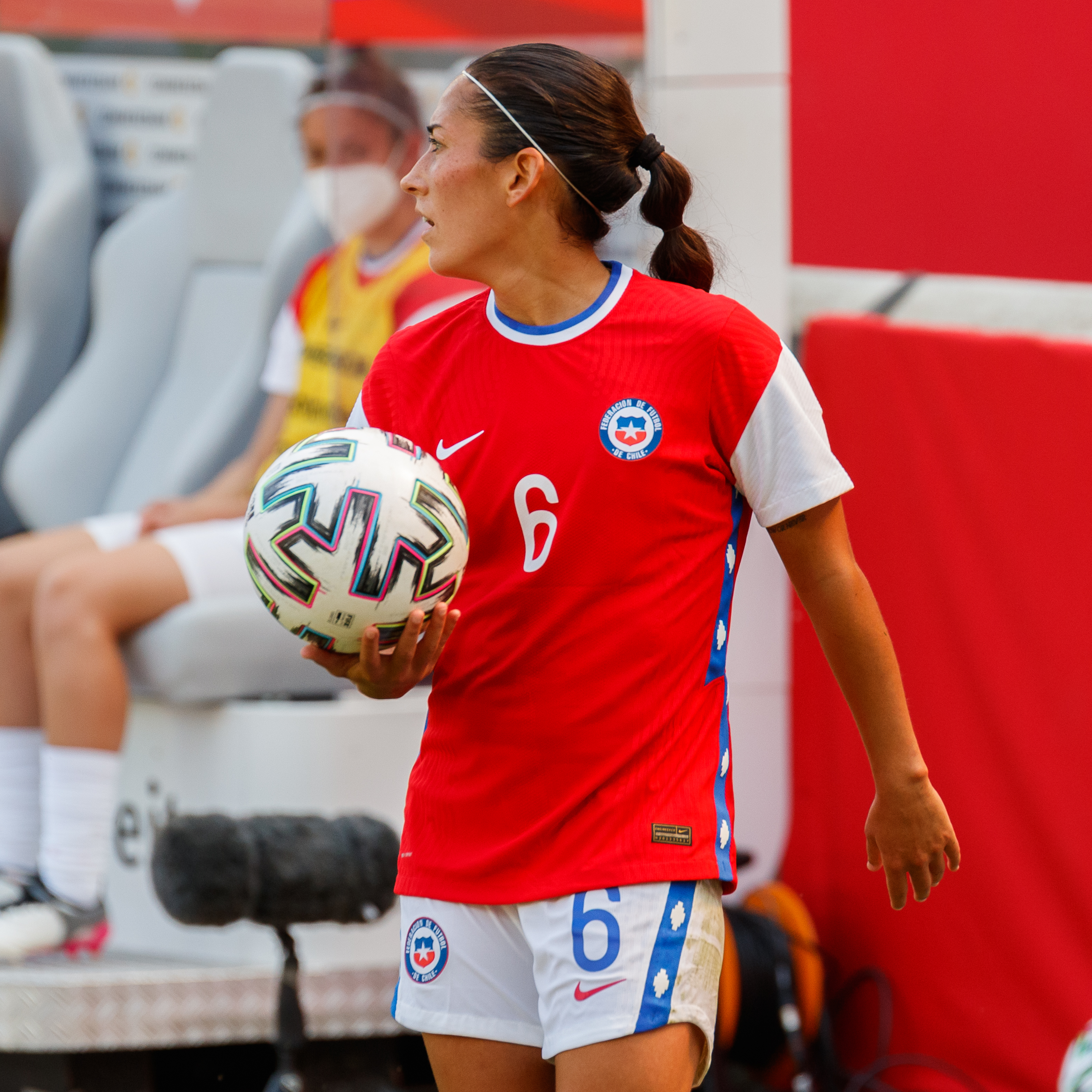
- López with Chile in 2021

Personal information
- Full name: Nayadet Zulema López Opazo
- Date of birth: 5 August 1994 (age 32)
- Place of birth: Manises, Spain
- Height: 1.63 m (5 ft 4 in)
- Position: Midfielder

Team information
- Current team: Alavés Gloriosas
- Number: 6

Senior career*
Years	Team	Apps	(Gls)
2009–2010	Valencia B		
2010–2013	Valencia	36	(0)
2013	Hércules		
2013–2016	Sporting Plaza de Argel		
2016–2021	Santa Teresa	87+	(1+)
2021–2024	Espanyol	58	(5)
2024–	Alavés Gloriosas	0	(0)

International career^{‡}
2019–	Chile	19	(0)
- * Club domestic league appearances and goals as of 16 July 2024 ‡ National team caps and goals as of 24 July 2022

Nayadet Zulema López Opazo (born 5 August 1994) is a footballer who plays as a midfielder for Alavés Gloriosas. Born and raised in Spain to a Spanish father and a Chilean mother, she plays for the Chile women's national team.

== Club career ==
López made her debut for Valencia B in 2009, at age 15. She was promoted to the first team in 2010, making her Primera División debut on 20 September. On 24 January 2013, she left Valencia due to discrepancies with the coach. She was signed by Segunda División club Hércules shortly after, being presented on February 15. The team was renamed back as Sporting Plaza de Argel a few months later, where López remained until 2016. She joined Santa Teresa in the 2016 summer. She suffered a ruptured anterior cruciate ligament during a training on 6 December 2016, receiving medical discharge on 14 June 2017.

In the second half of 2024, she joined Alavés Gloriosas.

== International career ==
Due to her birthplace and her background, López was eligible to play for Spain or Chile. She chose the latter and was called up for the first time in October 2019. She made her debut on 6 October 2019.

== Personal life ==
López was born to a Chilean mother and a Spanish father in Manises, Spain in 1994. She noticed that she could play for Chile through a journalist in Valencia. So, she started the naturalization process in 2018, what finished in 2019, but she couldn't take part in the squad for the 2019 World Cup due to the closeness with the start of it.
