= Yannel Correa =

Uruguayan footballer (born 1996)

Personal information
- Full name: Alices Yannel Correa Santa Cruz
- Date of birth: 10 September 1996 (age 30)
- Place of birth: Badajoz, Spain
- Height: 1.74 m (5 ft 9 in)
- Position: Centre-back

Team information
- Current team: Sporting de Huelva
- Number: 5

Senior career*
Years	Team	Apps	(Gls)
2010–2013	Murcia Féminas		
2013–2016	Sporting Plaza de Argel		
2016–2017	Murcia Féminas		
2017–2018	Fundación Albacete	11	(0)
2018–2019	Elche	3+	(0+)
2019–2021	Joventut Almassora	31+	(1+)
2021–2023	Real Oviedo	53	(3)
2023–	Sporting de Huelva	1	(0)

International career^{‡}
2019–	Uruguay	5	(1)
- * Club domestic league appearances and goals as of 1 October 2023 ‡ National team caps and goals as of 21 February 2023

Alices Yannel Correa Santa Cruz (born 10 September 1996) is a professional footballer who plays as a centre-back for Liga F club Sporting de Huelva. Born in Spain to Uruguayan parents, she plays for the Uruguay women's national team.

== Early life ==
Correa was born to Uruguayan parents in Badajoz, Spain in 1996. At that time, her father, former Uruguay international footballer Gabriel Correa, was playing for AD Mérida. After her father finished his career, her family (which includes an older brother) settled in Murcia, the first Spanish city where her father had played and where her brother was born.

== Club career ==
Nicknamed La Negra (The Black), Correa made her debut for Murcia Féminas in 2010, at age 13 or 14. The team promoted to Segunda División in 2011 and was Group 7 runner-up in the 2012–13 season. On 26 June 2013, she was signed by fellow Segunda División team Sporting Plaza de Argel, where she would spend the next three seasons. In July 2016, she returned to Murcia Féminas. On 10 February 2017, she was signed by Primera División side Fundación Albacete. She made her debut for them on 18 February 2017 in an away lost against Atlético Madrid. She broke the meniscus and the cruciate ligament in early October 2017, after being an unused substitute in the first two league matches of the 2017–2018 season.

== International career ==
Due to her birthplace and her background, Correa is eligible to play for Spain or Uruguay. She chose the latter. In February 2018, she was one of the six Uruguayan players abroad who were reserved to play for the country at the 2018 Copa América Femenina.

== International goals ==
No.	Date	Venue	Opponent	Score	Result	Competition
1.	21 February 2023	Stade Francis Le Basser, Laval, France	Denmark	1–1	2–3	2023 Tournoi de France
