= Daiana Falfán =

Argentine footballer (born 2000)

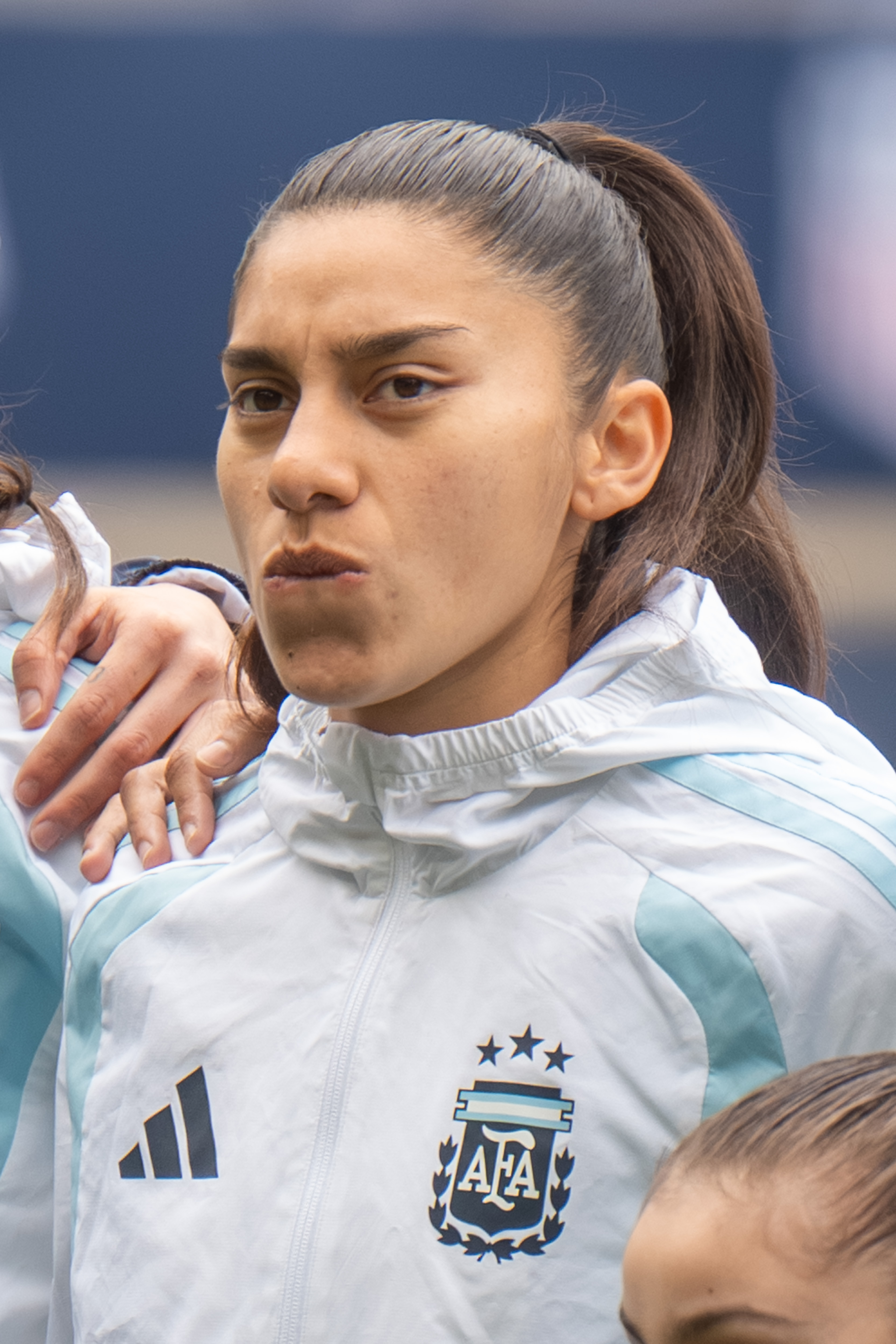
- Falfan with Argentina in 2026

Personal information
- Full name: Daiana Micaela Falfán
- Date of birth: 14 October 2000 (age 26)
- Place of birth: Hurlingham, Buenos Aires, Argentina
- Height: 1.65 m (5 ft 5 in)
- Position: Midfielder

Team information
- Current team: Dux Logroño

Senior career*
Years	Team	Apps	(Gls)
2015–2018	Deportivo Morón		
2018–2024	UAI Urquiza		
2024	Granada	3	(0)
2024–2025	Newell's Old Boys		
2025–	Dux Logroño		

International career^{‡}
- Argentina U20
2019–	Argentina	64	(2)
Medal record
Women's football
Representing Argentina
Copa América Femenina
Third place	2022 Colombia
Third place	2025 Ecuador
- * Club domestic league appearances and goals as of 17 February 2024 ‡ National team caps and goals as of 13 October 2026

Daiana Micaela Falfán (born 14 October 2000) is an Argentine professional footballer who plays as a midfielder for Liga F club Dux Logroño and the Argentina women's national team.

== International career ==
Falfán made her senior debut for Argentina on 7 November 2019, in a 2–1 away friendly won against Paraguay.

== Career statistics ==
=== International ===
As of match played 13 October 2026

Appearances and goals by national team and year
National team	Year	Apps	Goals
Argentina	2019	3	0
Argentina	2021	9	0
Argentina	2022	13	0
Argentina	2023	13	0
Argentina	2024	4	0
Argentina	2025	12	1
Argentina	2026	10	1
Total		64	2

=== International goals ===
Scores and results list Argentina's goal tally first

No.	Date	Venue	Opponent	Score	Result	Competition
1	18 July 2025	Estadio Banco Guayaquil, Quito, Ecuador	Chile	1–1	2–1	2025 Copa América Femenina
2	13 October 2026	Arena Pernambuco, São Lourenço da Mata, Brazil	Brazil	1–2	2–2	Friendly

== Honours ==
=== Clubs ===
UAI Urquiza

- Primera División A: 2018–19
- Copa Federal: 2021

Newell's Old Boys

- Primera División A: Apertura 2025
- Copa Federal: 2024
