= Ximena Velazco =

Uruguayan footballer (born 1995)

Personal information
- Full name: Ximena Daiana Velazco Núñez
- Date of birth: 31 July 1995 (age 31)
- Place of birth: Uruguay
- Height: 1.56 m (5 ft 1 in)
- Position: Midfielder

Team information
- Current team: Avaí
- Number: 8

Senior career*
Years	Team	Apps	(Gls)
2013–2017	Nacional	51+	(18+)
2018–20??	Peñarol	35	(28)
2021	Internacional	10	(0)
2023–	Avaí	6	(0)

International career^{‡}
2018–	Uruguay	3	(0)
- * Club domestic league appearances and goals as of 1 April 2023 ‡ National team caps and goals as of 10 April 2018

Ximena Daiana Velazco Núñez (born 31 July 1995) is a Uruguayan professional footballer who plays as a midfielder for Brazilian Série A1 club Avaí FC and the Uruguay women's national team.

== International goals ==
No.	Date	Venue	Opponent	Score	Result	Competition
1.	7 April 2023	Estadio Parque Capurro, Montevideo, Uruguay	Peru	1–0	6–1	Friendly
