= Stephanie Tregartten =

Uruguayan footballer (born 1997)

Personal information
- Full name: Stephanie Gisel Tregartten Fontes
- Date of birth: 13 October 1997 (age 29)
- Place of birth: Montevideo, Uruguay
- Height: 1.59 m (5 ft 2 1/2 in)
- Position: Defender

Team information
- Current team: Paysandú

Senior career*
Years	Team	Apps	(Gls)
2012–2013	Sud América		
2017–	Paysandú		

International career^{‡}
2012	Uruguay U17	2	(0)
2018–	Uruguay	4	(0)
- * Club domestic league appearances and goals ‡ National team caps and goals as of 12 April 2018

Stephanie Gisel "Colo" Tregartten Fontes (born 13 October 1997) is a Uruguayan footballer who plays as a defender for Paysandú FC and the Uruguay women's national team.

== International career ==
Tregartten represented Uruguay at the 2012 FIFA U-17 Women's World Cup. At senior level, she played the 2018 Copa América Femenina.
