= Ryann Torrero =

Chilean footballer (born 1990)

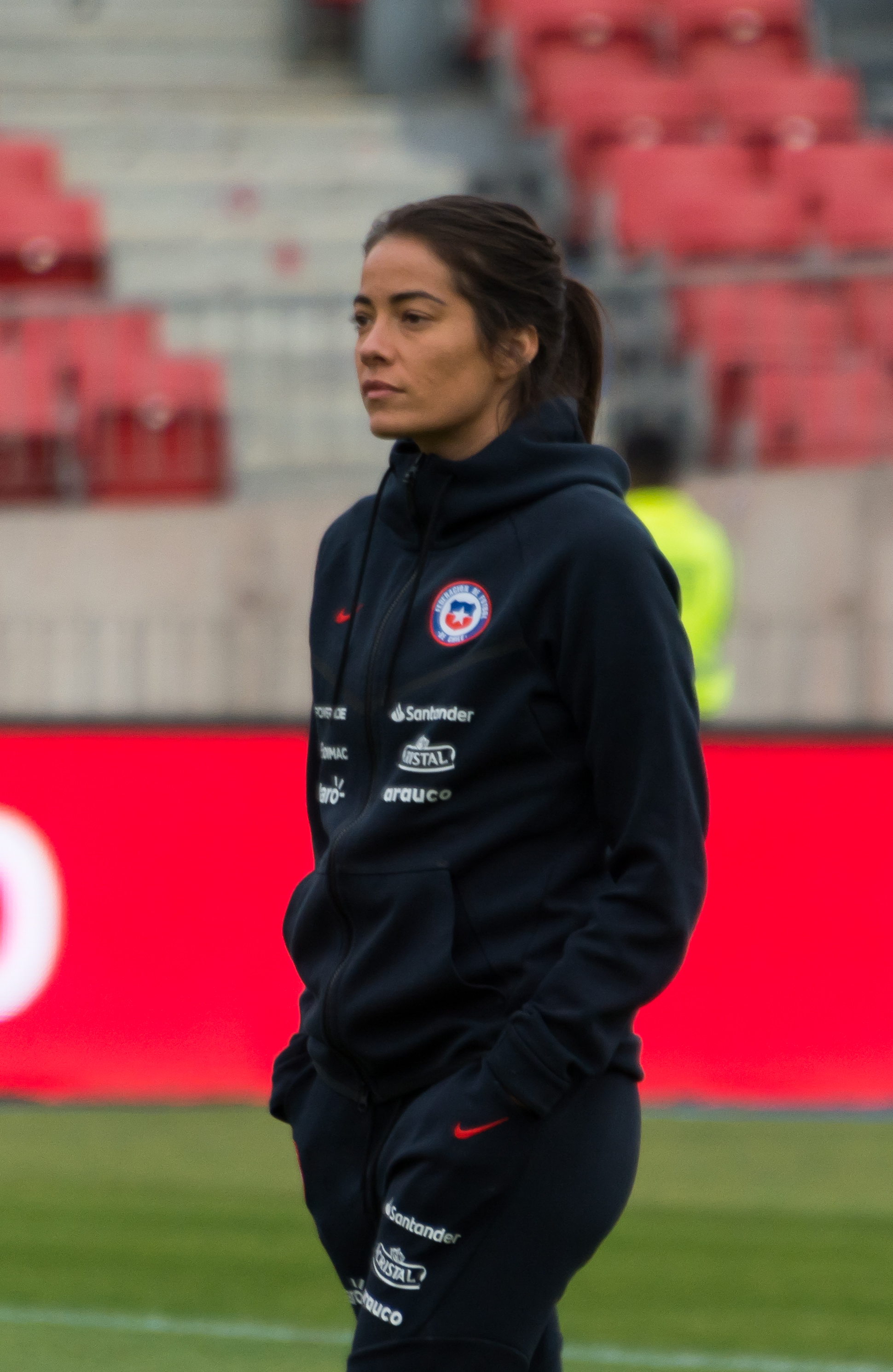
- Torrero with Chile in 2019

Personal information
- Full name: Ryan Danielle Torrero Rojas
- Birth name: Ryan Danielle Torrero
- Date of birth: 1 September 1990 (age 36)
- Place of birth: Burbank, California, U.S.
- Height: 1.74 m (5 ft 9 in)
- Position: Goalkeeper

Team information
- Current team: Colo-Colo
- Number: 1

Youth career
- Real So Cal
- –2008: Village Christian Crusaders

College career
Years	Team	Apps	(Gls)
2008	Wyoming Cowgirls	2	(0)
2010–2012	Campbell Lady Camels	37	(0)

Senior career*
Years	Team	Apps	(Gls)
2014	Los Angeles Strikers		
2015–2016	FC Neunkirch		
2017	Santa Clarita Blue Heat		
2018	Chicago Red Stars		
2019–2021	Santiago Morning		
2023–	Colo-Colo		

International career^{‡}
2019–	Chile	1	(0)

Managerial career
- 2017 –: Pepperdine Waves (assistant)
- * Club domestic league appearances and goals as of 18:06, 27 December 2019 (UTC) ‡ National team caps and goals as of 18:06, 27 December 2019 (UTC)

Ryan Danielle Torrero Rojas (born 1 September 1990), known as Ryann Torrero, is a footballer who plays as a goalkeeper for Colo-Colo. Born in the United States, she plays for the Chile women's national team.

== Career ==
In high school, Torrero played for the Crusaders of Village Christian School, where she was the team captain as a senior and a two-time CIF first-team selection. She also played for the Real So Cal youth team, where she won the San Diego Surf Cup, the Coast Soccer League's Premier League and the Super Y League. In college, she played in two matches for the Wyoming Cowgirls in 2008. She took a medical redshirt for her 2009 season before transferring to Campbell University, where she played for the Lady Camels from 2010 to 2012. She made 37 appearances for the Lady Camels, and was included in the Atlantic Sun All-Academic Team in 2010.

Torrero has appeared for the Chile women's national team, including in a friendly match against Colombia on 16 May 2019. She was included in Chile's squad for the 2019 FIFA Women's World Cup in France, though she did not make an appearance.

Torrero has also worked as a volunteer assistant coach for the Pepperdine Waves women's soccer team since 2017.

== Personal life ==
Torrero is a native of Burbank, California. Her father was born in Chicago and is of Spanish descent. She was eligible to play for Chile through her mother, who emigrated from Santiago in her youth. In 2016, Torrero was in a severe traffic collision on U.S. Route 101 near Camarillo, which put her career on hiatus after suffering head, back and hip injuries. She also works as a model.

== Honours ==
Santiago Morning

- Primera División (2): 2019, 2020

Colo-Colo

- Primera División (4): 2023, 2024, 2025, 2026

Chile

- Turkish Women's Cup (1): 2020

Individual

- Premios FutFem - Best Goalkeeper: 2023
- Primera División Ideal Team: 2025
