= Fernanda Ramírez =

Chilean footballer (born 1992)

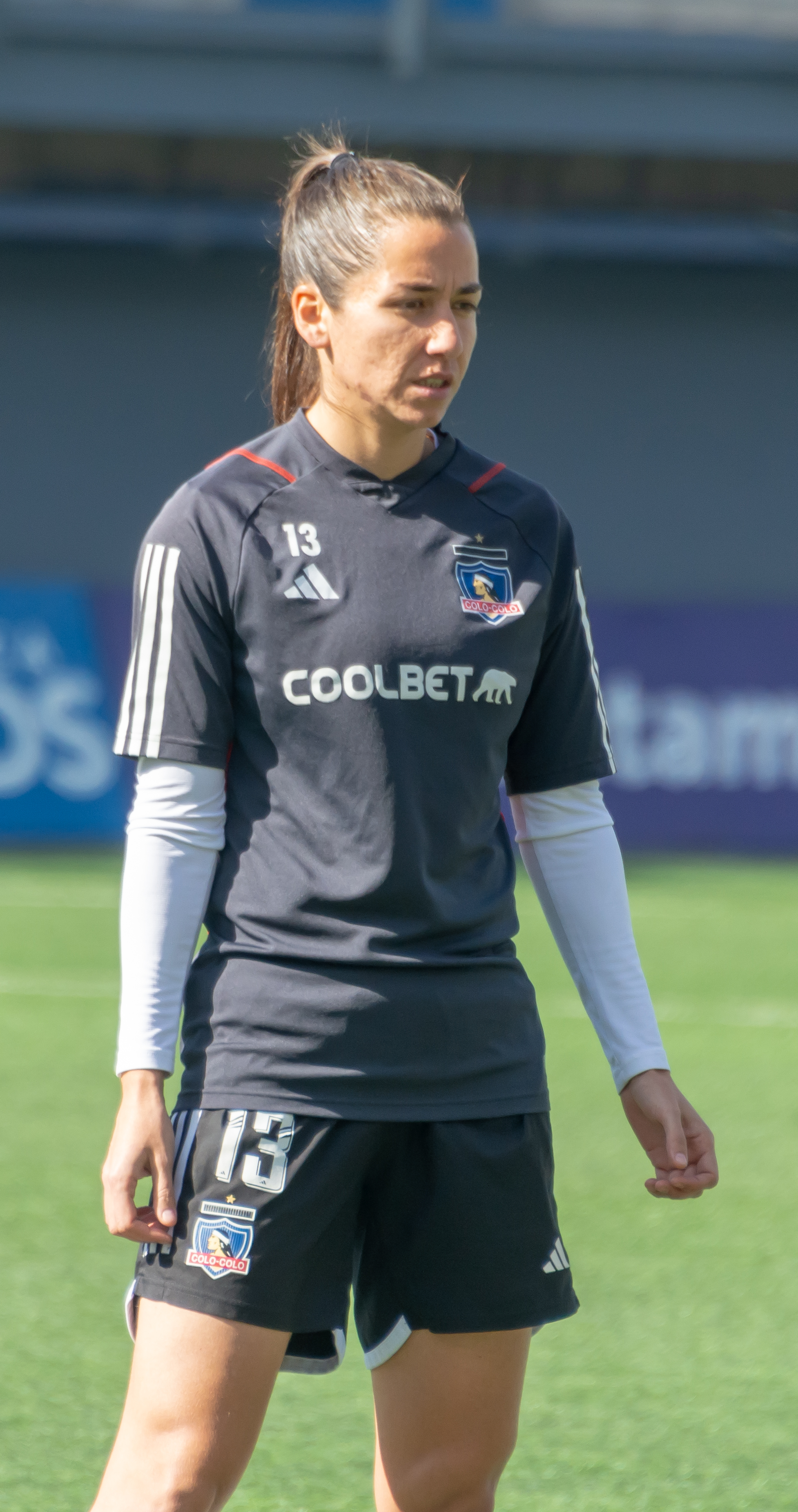
- Ramírez with Colo-Colo in 2023

Personal information
- Full name: Fernanda Andrea Ramírez Mellado
- Date of birth: 30 August 1992 (age 34)
- Place of birth: Santiago, Chile
- Height: 1.72 m (5 ft 8 in)
- Position: Defender

College career
Years	Team	Apps	(Gls)
2011	Cumberlands Patriots		
2012	Central Methodist Eagles		

Senior career*
Years	Team	Apps	(Gls)
2017–2018	Audax Italiano		
2019	Santiago Morning		
2020–2021	Universidad de Chile		
2022–2025	Colo-Colo		
2025	→ Universidad Católica (loan)		

International career^{‡}
2020–	Chile	14	(0)
Medal record
Women's football
Representing Chile
Pan American Games
Silver medal – second place	2023 Santiago	Team
- * Club domestic league appearances and goals ‡ National team caps and goals as of 6 November 2023

Fernanda Andrea Ramírez Mellado (born 30 August 1992) is a Chilean footballer who plays as a defender.

== Early life ==
Ramírez was raised in Santiago.

== College career ==
Ramírez played soccer in University of Cumberlands and Central Methodist University, both at NAIA level.

== Club career ==
Ramírez debuted for Audax Italiano in 2018. She played in Santiago Morning in 2019 and won the 2019 National Championship with "Chago".

Ramírez joined Universidad de Chile in 2020. She scored her first goal against Universidad Católica in 2021 season.

From 2022 to 2024, Ramírez played for Colo-Colo. In 2025, she was loaned out to Universidad Católica. She ended his contract with Colo-Colo at the end of 2025.

== International career ==
Ramírez was called to Chile's senior squad as a replacement for the injured Carla Guerrero on 29 November 2020. She was included in the 22-player squad for the Olympics Intercontinental Play-offs against Cameroon in Apr 2021.

Ramírez made her senior debut in a friendly against Slovakia on 10 Jun 2021 where their team lost 0–1 to the Slovaks.

She represented Chile at the 2023 Pan American Games, where Chile won the silver medal.

== Honours ==
Santiago Morning

- Primera División (1): 2019

Universidad de Chile

- Primera División (1): 2021

Colo-Colo

- Primera División (2): 2022, 2023

Chile

- Pan American Games Silver Medal: 2023

Individual

- Premios Contragolpe - Ideal Team: 2021
- Premios FutFem - Best Centre-back: 2022
