= Geraldine Cisneros =

Peruvian footballer (born 1996)

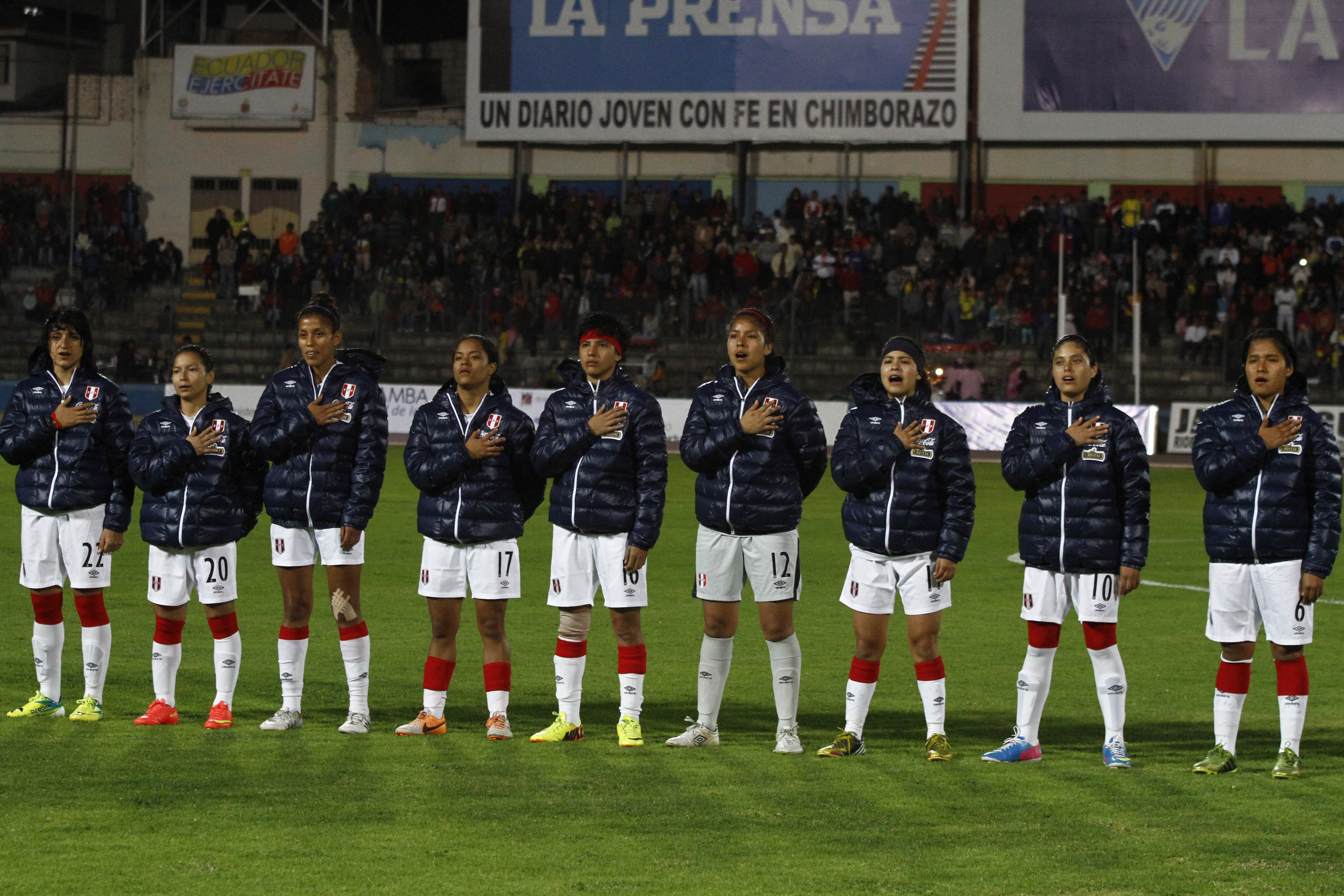
- Cisneros representing Peru at the 2014 Copa América Femenina

Personal information
- Full name: Geraldine Yesenia Cisneros Matos
- Date of birth: 14 January 1996 (age 30)
- Height: 1.60 m (5 ft 3 in)
- Position: Midfielder

Senior career*
Years	Team	Apps	(Gls)
- Universitario

International career^{‡}
2012	Peru U17	1+	(1)
2014–2015	Peru U20	1+	(1)
2014–	Peru	3	(0)
- * Club domestic league appearances and goals ‡ National team caps and goals as of 20 September 2014

Geraldine Yesenia Cisneros Matos (born 12 March 1996) is a Peruvian footballer who plays as a midfielder for Club Universitario de Deportes and the Peru women's national team.

Cisneros represented Peru at the 2012 South American U-17 Women's Championship and two South American U-20 Women's Championship editions (2014 and 2015). At senior level, she played the 2014 Copa América Femenina.
