= Fabiola Herrera =

Peruvian footballer (born 1987)

Personal information
- Full name: Fabiola Johana Herrera Zegarra
- Date of birth: 18 June 1987 (age 39)
- Height: 1.66 m (5 ft 5 in)
- Position: Centre back

Team information
- Current team: Universitario

Senior career*
Years	Team	Apps	(Gls)
- Sport Girls
2019	Millonarios		
2020–	Universitario	0	(0)

International career^{‡}
2006–2025	Peru	22+	(0)
2017	Peru (futsal)	1+	(2)
- * Club domestic league appearances and goals ‡ National team caps and goals as of 6 November 2026

Fabiola Johana Herrera Zegarra (born 18 June 1987) is a Peruvian footballer who plays as a centre back for Club Universitario de Deportes and the Peru women's national team. She is also a futsal player, who appeared at the 2017 Copa América Femenina de Futsal for Peru. Besides Peru, she has played in Colombia.

== Club career ==
Herrera is a former player of Sport Girls.

== International career ==
Herrera played for Peru at senior level in the 2006 South American Women's Football Championship. She also appeared in a 0–12 friendly loss to Chile on 28 May 2017.
