= Colo-Colo (women) =

Women's team of Chilean football club Colo-Colo

- Full name: Club Social y Deportivo Colo-Colo Femenino
- Founded: 2007
- Ground: Estadio Monumental David Arellano, Santiago
- Capacity: 47,000
- Chairman: Alfredo Stöhwing
- Manager: Tatiele Silveira
- League: Campeonato Nacional Fútbol Femenino
- 2025: Campeonato Nacional Fútbol Femenino, 1st of 14
- Website: http://www.colocolo.cl/category/equipos/futbol-femenino/
Home colours	Away colours

Colo-Colo Femenino is a Chilean women's football club from Santiago representing Colo-Colo in the Chilean women's championship. It was founded in 2007.

Colo-Colo has won the championship, which is played in the Apertura and Clausura system, nine times from 2010 to 2014. They are Chilean record champions.

In 2011, it reached the Copa Libertadores's final in its debut in the competition, beating 4-1 Caracas FC in the semifinals before losing 0–1 to host São José EC. The next year they won the Copa Libertadores on penalties against Foz Cataratas to be the first non-Brazilian champions of the tournament.

== Honours ==
=== National ===
- Campeonato Nacional Fútbol:
  - Winners (17): 2010, 2011-A, 2011-C, 2012-A, 2012-C, 2013-A, 2013-C, 2014-A. 2014-C, 2015-A, 2016-C, 2017-A, 2017-C, 2022, 2023, 2024, 2025

=== Continental ===
- Copa Libertadores Femenina:
  - Winners (1): 2012

== Players ==
=== Current squad ===
as of 25 Feb 2023 Note: Flags indicate national team as defined under FIFA eligibility rules; some limited exceptions apply. Players may hold more than one non-FIFA nationality.

No.	Pos.	Nation	Player
1	GK	CHI	Ryann Torrero
2	DF	CHI	Martina Osses
3	DF	CHI	Rocío Soto
4	MF	CHI	Elisa Durán
6	MF	CHI	Yastin Jiménez
7	FW	CHI	Isidora Olave
9	FW	CHI	María José Urrutia
10	MF	VEN	Yusmery Ascanio (C)
11	FW	CHI	Antonia Alarcón
12	GK	CHI	Javiera Díaz
13	DF	CHI	Fernanda Ramírez
14	FW	CHI	Javiera Grez

No.	Pos.	Nation	Player
15	DF	CHI	Anaís Cifuentes
16	DF	CHI	Fernanda Hidalgo
17	DF	CHI	Geraldine Leyton
18	FW	VEN	Ysaura Viso
19	DF	CHI	Michelle Olivares
23	FW	CHI	Nicol Sanhueza
25	MF	CHI	Margarita Collinao
26	MF	PAR	Dahiana Bogarín
27	MF	CHI	Valentina Lucero
30	DF	CHI	Aixa Helbringer
—	DF	CHI	Alexia Gallardo
—	MF	CHI	Yessenia López
