= Uruguay women's national football team =

Women's national association football team representing Uruguay

Uruguay
- Nickname(s): Las Celestes, Charrúas
- Association: Asociación Uruguaya de Fútbol
- Confederation: CONMEBOL (South America)
- Head coach: Ariel Longo
- Captain: Valeria Colmán
- Most caps: Aída Camaño
- Top scorer: Angélica Souza
- Home stadium: Estadio Centenario
- FIFA code: URU
| First colours | Second colours |

FIFA ranking
- Current: 62 ▼1 (16 June 2026)
- Highest: 55 (September – December 2008; August 2025)
- Lowest: 81 (September 2014)

First international
- Uruguay 2–3 Paraguay (Mar Del Plata, Argentina; 1 March 1998)

Biggest win
- Uruguay 7–0 Bolivia (Montevideo, Uruguay; 26 June 2022)

Biggest defeat
- Argentina 8–0 Uruguay (Salta, Argentina; 13 April 2003); Uruguay 0–8 Colombia (Barranquilla, Colombia; 6 June 2004)

Copa América
- Appearances: 8 (first in 1998)
- Best result: Third place (2006)

The Uruguay women's national football team represents Uruguay in international women's football.

The women's football section of the Uruguayan Football Association started in 1996, and the first official competition of the national team took place in the 1998 South American Championship. Separately, there was a women's football team representing Uruguay at least as early as 1962, when they played an international game at Estadio Belvedere against Argentina. The best performance to date in the South American Championship came in 2006, when Uruguay earned third place.

== Team image ==
=== Nicknames ===
The Uruguay women's national football team has been known or nicknamed as the "Las Celestes" or "Charrúas".

=== Home stadium ===
Uruguay plays their home matches on the Estadio Centenario.

== Results and fixtures ==
The following is a list of match results in the last 12 months, as well as any future matches that have been scheduled.

Legend

Win Draw Lose Fixture

=== 2025 ===
| 28 October 2025–26 CONMEBOL Liga de Naciones Femenina | Uruguay | 2–2 | Argentina | Montevideo, Uruguay |
| 18:00 UTC−3 | Lacoste 34'; Aquino 72' | Report (FIFA); Report (CONMEBOL) | M. Pereyra 48'; Paz 89' | Stadium: Estadio Centenario; Referee: Emikar Calderas (Venezuela) |

| 28 November 2025–26 CONMEBOL Liga de Naciones Femenina | Paraguay | 1–0 | Uruguay | Asunción, Paraguay |
| 20:00 UTC−3 | =C. Martínez 90+6' | Report (FIFA); Report (CONMEBOL) | | Stadium: Estadio Tigo La Huerta; Referee: Laura Fortunato (Argentina) |

| 2 December 2025–26 CONMEBOL Liga de Naciones Femenina | Uruguay | 0–0 | Ecuador | Montevideo, Uruguay |
| 18:00 UTC−3 | | Report (FIFA); Report (CONMEBOL) | | Stadium: Estadio Alfredo Victor Viera; Referee: Charly Deretti (Brazil) |

=== 2026 ===
| 10 April 2025–26 CONMEBOL Liga de Naciones Femenina | Peru | 2–1 | Uruguay | Cusco, Peru |
| 16:00 UTC−5 (Note: The Peru v Uruguay and Peru v Paraguay matches, originally scheduled at 18:00 local time, were rescheduled to 16:00 local time.) | García 33'; Arévalo 71' | Report | González 25' (pen.) | Stadium: Estadio Garcilaso; Referee: Paula Fernández (Colombia) |

| 14 April 2025–26 CONMEBOL Liga de Naciones Femenina | Bolivia | 1–2 | Uruguay | El Alto, Bolivia |
| 17:00 UTC−4 | Veizaga 78' | Report | Pizarro 61', 87' | Stadium: Estadio Municipal de El Alto; Referee: Elizabeth Tintaya (Peru) |

| 18 April 2025–26 CONMEBOL Liga de Naciones Femenina | Uruguay | 1–3 | Chile | Montevideo, Uruguay |
| 18:00 UTC−3 | Pa. González 5' | Report | Valencia 9'; Olivares 70'; Pardo 76' | Stadium: Estadio Centenario; Referee: Laura Fortunato (Argentina) |

| 5 June 2025–26 CONMEBOL Liga de Naciones Femenina | Colombia | 1–0 | Uruguay | Cali, Colombia |
| 18:00 UTC−5 | Robledo 14' | Report | | Stadium: Estadio Olimpico Pascual Guerrero; Referee: Verónica Guazhambo (Ecuador) |

| 9 June 2025–26 CONMEBOL Liga de Naciones Femenina | Uruguay | 1–1 | Venezuela | Montevideo, Uruguay |
| 20:00 UTC−3 | Pa. González 52' | Report | Castellanos 58' | Stadium: Estadio Centenario; Referee: Milagros Arruela (Peru) |

- Fixtures and results – Uruguayan Football Association
- Fixtures and results – Soccerway

== Coaching staff ==
=== Current coaching staff ===
As of 6 June 2021

== Current personnel ==
As of 27 June 2024

| Position | Name |
|---|---|
| Head coach | (Uruguay) Ariel Longo |
| Assistant coaches | (Argentina) Rami López (Chile) Diego Curbelo |
| Goalkeeping coach | (France) Enzo Chabert |

=== Coaching history ===
- Gonzalo Ribas (2003–????)
- Juan José Duarte (2006–????)
- Jorge Burgell (2010–????)
- Fabiana Manzolillo (2014–????)
- Ariel Longo (????–)

== Players ==
=== Current squad ===
- The following 23 players were called up for the 2025–26 CONMEBOL Liga de Naciones matches against Paraguay and Ecuador on 28 November and 2 December 2025.

Caps and goals accurate as of the 3 June 2025 match against Mexico.

| No. | Pos. | Player | Date of birth (age) | Club |
|---|---|---|---|---|
| 1 | GK | Agustina Sánchez | 11 September 1999 (aged 26) | (Argentine Football Association) Belgrano |
| 2 | GK | Romina Olmedo | 7 October 2006 (aged 19) | (Uruguayan Football Association) Defensor Sporting |
| 3 | GK | Josefina Villanueva | 3 February 2000 (aged 25) | (Uruguayan Football Association) Nacional |
| 4 | DF | Fátima Barone | 17 September 1999 (aged 26) | (Argentine Football Association) Belgrano |
| 5 | DF | Daiana Farías | 26 January 1999 (aged 26) | (Uruguayan Football Association) Peñarol |
| 6 | DF | Valentina Morales | 17 March 2001 (aged 24) | (Uruguayan Football Association) Liverpool |
| 7 | DF | Yannel Correa | 10 September 1996 (aged 29) | (Royal Spanish Football Federation) Alhama |
| 8 | DF | Stephanie Tregartten | 13 October 1997 (aged 28) | (Royal Spanish Football Federation) Real Oviedo |
| 9 | DF | Juliana Viera | 8 May 2002 (aged 23) | (United States Soccer Federation) East Carolina Pirates |
| 10 | DF | Laura Felipe | 3 March 1998 (aged 27) | (Argentine Football Association) Newell's Old Boys |
| 11 | DF | Stephanie Lacoste | 9 September 1996 (aged 29) | (Brazilian Football Confederation) Internacional |
| 12 | MF | Pamela González (captain) | 28 September 1995 (aged 30) | (Royal Spanish Football Federation) Sevilla |
| 13 | MF | Manuela Olvera | 6 June 2003 (aged 22) | (Uruguayan Football Association) Liverpool |
| 14 | MF | Ángela Gómez | 19 August 2002 (aged 23) | (Brazilian Football Confederation) Bahia |
| 15 | MF | Solange Lemos | 4 April 2003 (aged 22) | (Uruguayan Football Association) Liverpool |
| 16 | MF | Luciana Gómez | 6 August 2000 (aged 25) | (Brazilian Football Confederation) Botafogo |
| 17 | MF | Karol Bermúdez | 18 April 2001 (aged 24) | (Brazilian Football Confederation) Red Bull Bragantino |
| 18 | MF | Pilar González | 29 June 2002 (aged 23) | (Argentine Football Association) Talleres |
| 19 | MF | Sindy Ramírez | 28 January 1991 (aged 34) | (Argentine Football Association) Racing |
| 20 | FW | Wendy Carballo | 28 July 2002 (aged 23) | (Brazilian Football Confederation) Bahia |
| 21 | FW | Belén Aquino | 1 February 2002 (aged 23) | (Brazilian Football Confederation) Internacional |
| 22 | FW | Esperanza Pizarro | 15 April 2001 (aged 24) | (Royal Spanish Football Federation) Eibar |
| 23 | FW | Ximena Velazco | 31 July 1995 (aged 30) | (Royal Spanish Football Federation) DUX Logroño |
| 24 | FW | Agustina Gómez | 12 August 2002 (aged 23) | (Uruguayan Football Association) Liverpool |

=== Recent call-ups ===
The following list of active players were not called up for the latest match of the national team, but were called up for an A-level match within the last 12 months.

| Pos. | Player | Date of birth (age) | Caps | Goals | Club | Latest call-up |
|---|---|---|---|---|---|---|
| DF | Valentina Cousillas | 22 January 2002 (age 24) | 0 | 0 | (Uruguay) Liverpool | v. Argentina, 28 October 2025 |
| FW | Alaides Paz | 27 May 1996 (age 30) | 0 | 0 | (Argentina) Belgrano | v. Argentina, 28 October 2025 |
| FW | Sofía Oxandabarat | 15 June 1994 (age 32) | 8 | 0 | (Uruguay) Nacional | v. Argentina, 28 October 2025 |
INJ = Withdrew due to injury; PRE = Preliminary squad; RET = Retired from the national team; COV = COVID-19 positive test or close contact

=== Previous squads ===
FIFA Women's World Cup

- 2018 Copa América Femenina squad

=== Captains ===
- Valeria Colmán (????–)

== Records ==
Active players in bold, statistics correct as of 2020.

=== Most capped players ===
| # | Player | Year(s) | Caps |
|---|---|---|---|
| **1** | **Laura Felipe** | 2014–present | 21 |

=== Top goalscorers ===
| # | Player | Year(s) | Goals | Caps |
|---|---|---|---|---|
| **1** | **Belén Aquino** | 2019–present | 10 | 15 |

== Competitive record ==
=== FIFA Women's World Cup ===
FIFA Women's World Cup record
| Year | Round | Position | Pld | W | D* | L | GF | GA |
|---|---|---|---|---|---|---|---|---|
| (China) 1991 | Did not enter | | | | | | | |
| (Sweden) 1995 | Did not enter | | | | | | | |
| (United States) 1999 | Did not qualify | | | | | | | |
| (United States) 2003 | Did not qualify | | | | | | | |
| (China) 2007 | Did not qualify | | | | | | | |
| (Germany) 2011 | Did not qualify | | | | | | | |
| (Canada) 2015 | Did not qualify | | | | | | | |
| (France) 2019 | Did not qualify | | | | | | | |
| (Australia) (New Zealand) 2023 | Did not qualify | | | | | | | |
| (Brazil) 2027 | To be determined | | | | | | | |
| (Costa Rica) (Jamaica) (Mexico) (United States) 2031 | To be determined | | | | | | | |
| (United Kingdom) 2035 | To be determined | | | | | | | |
| Total | – | – | – | – | – | – | – | – |

*Draws include knockout matches decided on penalty kicks.

=== Olympic Games ===
Summer Olympics record
| Year | Result | Pld | W | D* | L | GF | GA |
|---|---|---|---|---|---|---|---|
| (United States) 1996 | Did not enter | | | | | | |
| (Australia) 2000 | Did not qualify | | | | | | |
| (Greece) 2004 | Did not qualify | | | | | | |
| (China) 2008 | Did not qualify | | | | | | |
| (United Kingdom) 2012 | Did not qualify | | | | | | |
| (Brazil) 2016 | Did not qualify | | | | | | |
| (Japan) 2020 | Did not qualify | | | | | | |
| (France) 2024 | Did not qualify | | | | | | |
| Total | – | – | – | – | – | – | – |

*Draws include knockout matches decided on penalty kicks.

=== CONMEBOL Copa América Femenina ===
CONMEBOL Copa América Femenina record
| Year | Round | Position | GP | W | D* | L | GS | GA |
|---|---|---|---|---|---|---|---|---|
| (Brazil) 1991 | Did not enter | | | | | | | |
| (Brazil) 1995 | Did not enter | | | | | | | |
| (Argentina) 1998 | Group stage | 8th | 4 | 0 | 2 | 2 | 6 | 8 |
| (Peru) (Argentina) (Ecuador) 2003 | Group stage | 9th | 2 | 0 | 0 | 2 | 1 | 11 |
| (Argentina) 2006 | **Third place** | **3rd** | **7** | **3** | **0** | **4** | **7** | **14** |
| (Ecuador) 2010 | Group stage | 10th | 4 | 0 | 0 | 4 | 2 | 21 |
| (Ecuador) 2014 | Group stage | 7th | 4 | 2 | 0 | 2 | 5 | 9 |
| (Chile) 2018 | Group stage | 8th | 4 | 0 | 1 | 3 | 2 | 11 |
| (Colombia) 2022 | Group stage | 8th | 4 | 1 | 0 | 3 | 6 | 9 |
| (Ecuador) 2025 | Fourth Place | 4th | 6 | 2 | 2 | 2 | 9 | 10 |
| Total | 8/10 | – | 35 | 8 | 5 | 22 | 38 | 93 |

*Draws include knockout matches decided on penalty kicks.

=== Pan American Games ===
Pan American Games record
| Year | Round | Position | GP | W | D* | L | GS | GA |
|---|---|---|---|---|---|---|---|---|
| (Canada) 1999 | Did not enter | | | | | | | |
| (Dominican Republic) 2003 | Did not enter | | | | | | | |
| (Brazil) 2007 | Group stage | 9th | 4 | 0 | 1 | 3 | 3 | 16 |
| (Mexico) 2011 | Did not enter | | | | | | | |
| (Canada) 2015 | Did not qualify | | | | | | | |
| (Peru) 2019 | Did not qualify | | | | | | | |
| (Chile) 2023 | Did not qualify | | | | | | | |
| (Colombia) 2027 | To be determined | | | | | | | |
| Total | 1/6 | – | 4 | 0 | 1 | 3 | 3 | 16 |

*Draws include knockout matches decided on penalty kicks.

=== South American Games ===
South American Games record
| Year | Result | Pld | W | D* | L | GF | GA |
|---|---|---|---|---|---|---|---|
| (Chile) 2014 | Groupe stage | 3 | 0 | 1 | 2 | 0 | 6 |
| (Bolivia) 2018 to present | U-20 Tournament | | | | | | |
| Total | Group stage | 3 | 0 | 1 | 2 | 0 | 6 |

*Draws include knockout matches decided on penalty kicks.

== Honours ==
=== Major competitions ===
- **Copa América Femenina**
  - (bronze) Third place (1): 2006

== See also ==
- Sport in Uruguay
  - Football in Uruguay
    - Women's football in Uruguay
- Uruguay women's national football team
  - Uruguay women's national football team results
  - List of Uruguay women's international footballers
- Uruguay women's national under-20 football team
- Uruguay women's national under-17 football team
- Uruguay men's national football team
