= 2024 Argentine Women's Primera División A =

Primera División A
- Season: 2024
- Dates: 9 March – 15 December 2024
- Champions: Torneo Apertura: Boca Juniors (29th title)
- Matches played: 153
- Goals scored: 399 (2.61 per match)
- Top goalscorer: Torneo Apertura: Andrea Ojeda (14 goals)
- Biggest home win: Boca Juniors 8–0 UAI Urquiza (16 March 2024)
- Biggest away win: Excursionistas 0–8 Boca Juniors (22 March 2024)
- Highest scoring: Boca Juniors 8–0 UAI Urquiza (16 March 2024); Excursionistas 0–8 Boca Juniors (22 March 2024)
- Longest winning run: Boca Juniors; 7 games
- Longest unbeaten run: Boca Juniors; 17 games
- Longest winless run: Excursionistas; 17 games
- Longest losing run: Excursionistas; 17 games
- All statistics correct as of 21 July 2024.

The 2024 Argentine Women's Primera División A was the 6th season of top-flight semi-professional women's football in Argentina and the 34th season overall. The league season began on 9 March and ended on 15 December 2024.

Eighteen teams competed in the league: sixteen returning from the 2023 season as well as two promoted teams from the 2023 Primera División B (Newell's Old Boys and San Luis FC), both teams participated in Primera División A for the first time in history from this season. Boca Juniors were the defending champions.

== Competition format ==
The season is divided in two separate championships, called Apertura and Clausura. Both tournaments are run under a single round-robin, contested by 18 teams (16 from the previous edition plus 2 promoted from Primera División B). If each tournament is won by a different team, they will play a single-legged qualifier for the 2025 Copa Libertadores Femenina.

In this season the bottom four teams of an aggregate table of the Apertura and Clausura tournaments will be relegated to the Primera División B.

== Club information ==
=== Stadia and locations ===
Locations of the 2024 Argentine Women's Primera División A teams outside Greater Buenos Aires.
Locations of the 2024 Women's Argentine Primera División A teams within Greater Buenos Aires.

Most Argentine women's teams, with a few exceptions, play their home games in other facilities of their clubs and not in the main stadium, unless it is a special occasion, according to the club's interpretation. Both venues where it is most common for them to play at home and where they occasionally play are shown.

Club	City	Stadium	Capacity
Banfield	Banfield	Florencio Sola	34,901
Banfield	Banfield	Campo de deportes Alfredo Palacios	—
Belgrano	Córdoba	Julio César Villagra	35,000
Belgrano	Córdoba	Predio Armando Pérez	—
Boca Juniors	Buenos Aires	Alberto J. Armando	57,200
Boca Juniors	Buenos Aires	Complejo Pedro Pompilio	—
Estudiantes (BA)	Caseros	Ciudad de Caseros	16,740
Estudiantes (BA)	Caseros	Predio de Martín Coronado	—
Excursionistas	Buenos Aires	Excursionistas	7,200
Ferro Carril Oeste	Buenos Aires	Ricardo Etcheverri	24,442
Ferro Carril Oeste	Buenos Aires	Predio de Pontevedra	—
Gimnasia y Esgrima (LP)	La Plata	Juan Carmelo Zerillo	24,544
Gimnasia y Esgrima (LP)	La Plata	Estancia Chica	—
Huracán	Buenos Aires	Tomás Adolfo Ducó	48,314
Huracán	Buenos Aires	Campo de Deportes Jorge Newbery	—
Independiente	Avellaneda	Libertadores de América	52,853
Independiente	Avellaneda	Predio de Villa Domínico	—
Newell's Old Boys	Rosario	Marcelo Bielsa	38,095
Newell's Old Boys	Rosario	Centro Jorge B. Griffa	—
Platense	Florida Este	Ciudad de Vicente López	28,530
Platense	Florida Este	Predio Alejandro Mariani Dolán	—
Racing	Avellaneda	Presidente Perón	55,389
Racing	Avellaneda	Predio Tita Mattiussi	—
River Plate	Buenos Aires	Mâs Monumental	83,196
River Plate	Buenos Aires	River Camp	—
Rosario Central	Rosario	Gigante de Arroyito	41,654
Rosario Central	Rosario	Arroyo Seco	12,000
Rosario Central	Rosario	Ciudad Deportiva de Rosario Central	—
San Lorenzo	Buenos Aires	Pedro Bidegain	39,494
San Lorenzo	Buenos Aires	Ciudad Deportiva	—
San Luis FC	La Punta	Juan Gilberto Funes	15,062
San Luis FC	La Punta	Socios Fundadores de Estancia Grande	—
SAT	Moreno	12 de Agosto	700
UAI Urquiza	Buenos Aires	Monumental de Villa Lynch	1,000
UAI Urquiza	Buenos Aires	Rancho Taxco	—

=== Personnel ===
Club	Manager	Kit manufacturer
Banfield	(Argentina) Indiana Fernández	(Argentina) Athix
Belgrano	(Argentina) Maximiliano Luján	(Italy) Erreà
Boca Juniors	(Argentina) Florencia Quiñones	(Germany) Adidas
Estudiantes (BA)	(Argentina) Roberto Hernández	(Argentina) Coach
Excursionistas	(Argentina) Claudio Paz	(Argentina) Mut
Ferro Carril Oeste	(Argentina) Franco Bertera	(Argentina) Sport Lyon
Gimnasia y Esgrima (LP)	(Argentina) Silvana Villalobos	(Italy) Givova
Huracán	(Argentina) Gastón Camargo	(Italy) Kappa
Independiente	(Argentina) Pablo Goglino	(Germany) Puma
Newell's Old Boys	(Argentina)	(United States) AIFIT
Platense	(Argentina) Matías Raia	(Denmark) Hummel
Racing	(Argentina) Héctor Bracamonte	(Italy) Kappa
River Plate	(Argentina) Ignacio Lacal	(Germany) Adidas
Rosario Central	(Argentina) Damián Ledesma	(United Kingdom) Umbro
San Lorenzo	(Argentina) Livio Prieto	(United States) Nike
San Luis FC	(Argentina) Carlos Casteglione	(Argentina) Coach
SAT	(Argentina) Rubén Noriega	(Argentina) Camisetas Fan
UAI Urquiza	(Argentina) Leandro Iglesias	(Argentina) Retiel

=== Managerial changes ===
Team	Outgoing manager	Date of vacancy	Position in table	Replaced by	Date of appointment
Estudiantes (BA)	(Argentina) Santiago Callaud	29 November 2023	Pre-season	(Argentina) Jessica Moreno	6 December 2023
Excursionistas	(Argentina) Ignacio Lacal	3 December 2023	Pre-season	(Argentina) Walter Martins	25 January 2024
River Plate	(Argentina) Daniela Díaz	4 December 2023	Pre-season	(Argentina) Ignacio Lacal	8 January 2024
Racing	(Argentina) Agustín Benchimol	7 December 2023	Pre-season	(Argentina) Héctor Bracamonte	19 December 2023
Huracán	(Argentina) Juan Palermo	19 December 2023	Pre-season	(Argentina) Igor Miranda	23 January 2024
Torneo Apertura changes
Estudiantes (BA)	(Argentina) Jessica Moreno	1 May 2024	15th	(Argentina) Roberto Hernández	3 May 2024
Excursionistas	(Argentina) Walter Martins	19 May 2024	18th	(Argentina) Claudio Paz ^{1}	26 May 2024
Huracán	(Argentina) Igor Miranda	10 June 2024	17th	(Argentina) Gastón Camargo ^{2}	12 June 2024
Newell's Old Boys	(Argentina) Miguel Fullana	13 June 2024	8th	(Argentina) Sergio Vergara ^{3}	13 June 2024
San Luis FC	(Argentina) Carlos Casteglione	4 July 2024	8th	(Argentina) Matías Fernández^{4} ^{5}	20 July 2024

Interim managers

1. (Argentina) Nicolás Heredia was interim manager in the 11th round.
2. (Argentina) Eduardo Quintairos was interim manager in the 12th round.
3. (Argentina) Interim manager until the end of the Apertura.
4. (Argentina) Samanta Montero was interim manager in the 16th round.
5. (Argentina) Interim manager, but later promoted to manager.

.

== Torneo Apertura ==
The Torneo Apertura was the first tournament of the season. It began on March 9 and ended on 21 July. Boca Juniors won their fifth tournament in a row, leading the table with 45 points from 14 wins and 3 draws in 17 games. The team managed by Florencia Quiñones finished the tournament without losing any match, and qualified for the Copa Libertadores Femenina play-off, to be held in December.

=== Standings ===
Pos	Team	Pld	W	D	L	GF	GA	GD	Pts	Qualification
1	Boca Juniors (C)	17	14	3	0	49	6	+43	45	Qualification for Copa Libertadores Femenina qualification play-off
2	Racing	17	10	6	1	33	10	+23	36	
3	River Plate	17	11	3	3	33	15	+18	36	
4	Belgrano	17	9	5	3	27	12	+15	32	
5	Ferro Carril Oeste	17	9	4	4	32	19	+13	31	
6	San Luis	17	7	7	3	25	17	+8	28	
7	Gimnasia y Esgrima (LP)	17	7	5	5	28	19	+9	26	
8	Independiente	17	7	4	6	18	24	−6	25	
9	San Lorenzo	17	7	3	7	23	20	+3	24	
10	Banfield	17	7	3	7	21	22	−1	24	
11	UAI Urquiza	17	7	2	8	20	21	−1	23	
12	Newell's Old Boys	17	7	2	8	19	22	−3	23	
13	SAT	17	6	2	9	19	21	−2	20	
14	Platense	17	3	8	6	14	19	−5	17	
15	Rosario Central	17	4	3	10	9	26	−17	15	
16	Estudiantes (BA)	17	3	3	11	15	32	−17	12	
17	Huracán	17	3	1	13	11	25	−14	10	
18	Excursionistas	17	0	0	17	3	63	−60	0	

Updated to match(es) played on 21 July 2024. Source: AFA
Rules for classification: 1) points; 2) goal difference; 3) goals scored; 4) head-to-head results; 5) fair play ranking 6) drawing of lots.
(C) Champions

=== Results ===
Teams will play every other team once (either at home or away) completing a total of 17 rounds.

Home \ Away	BAN	BEL	BOC	EST	EXC	FCO	GLP	HUR	IND	NOB	PLA	RAC	RIV	ROS	SLO	SLU	SAT	UAI
Banfield		3–1	0–1		4–2	1–1	2–5						0–1			0–1	1–2	
Belgrano			1–1		6–0	2–1	2–0	2–0					2–0		2–3	0–0	2–0	
Boca Juniors						2–0			2–0	2–1	4–0	1–1		4–0	4–0			8–0
Estudiantes (BA)	1–2	0–2	0–2		1–0		3–3						1–3			1–3	1–2	
Excursionistas			0–8			0–3		0–3	0–2					0–1	0–7	0–2	0–3	0–3
Ferro Carril Oeste				4–1					3–1	0–1	4–1	0–0		3–0	2–1			2–1
Gimnasia y Esgrima (LP)			1–1		6–0	1–1		3–0					1–2	1–0	1–1	0–2	1–0	
Huracán	0–1		0–2	1–2		2–3				0–1		0–1			0–2	0–1	1–0	
Independiente	0–2	0–0		4–3			3–2	2–0		1–1	1–0	0–4						0–0
Newell's Old Boys	2–0	0–1		1–0	4–1		0–1					0–2	2–3			2–1		
Platense	1–1	0–0		3–0	3–0		1–1	1–1		0–0		1–1	0–3					
Racing	1–1	2–2		2–0	6–0		1–0						0–0			4–1	1–2	
River Plate			0–2		7–0	1–1		1–0	3–1					3–0	2–1	1–1	3–0	
Rosario Central	0–1	0–2		0–0				0–3	1–1	2–1	0–2	1–2						1–0
San Lorenzo	1–2			0–0					0–1	1–2	1–0	1–3		2–1				1–0
San Luis FC			2–3			3–1			3–0		1–1			1–1	0–0		1–1	2–2
SAT			0–2			1–3			0–1	5–1	0–0			0–1	0–1			3–1
UAI Urquiza	2–0	2–0		0–1			0–1	3–0		2–0	1–0	0–2	3–0					

Updated to match(es) played on 21 July 2024. Source: AFA
Legend: Blue = home team win; Yellow = draw; Red = away team win.

=== Tournament statistics ===
==== Top goalscorers ====
Rank	Player	Club	Goals
1	(Argentina) Andrea Ojeda	Boca Juniors	14
2	(Argentina) Rocío Bueno	Racing	12
3	(Venezuela) Kimberlyn Campos	San Luis FC	10
4	(Argentina) Florencia Gaetán	Gimnasia y Esgrima (LP)	9
4	(Argentina) Julieta Lema	Newell's Old Boys	9
5	(Argentina) Raquel Polich	Ferro Carril Oeste	8
5	(Argentina) Marilyn Esquivel	Gimnasia y Esgrima (LP)	8
5	(Uruguay) Sindy Ramírez	Racing	8
5	(Japan) Ichika Egashira	River Plate	8
9	(Argentina) Mayra Acevedo	Belgrano	7
10	(Argentina) Celeste Dos Santos	Boca Juniors	6

Source: AFA

==== Top assists ====
Rank	Player	Club	Goals
1	(Argentina) Eliana Stábile	Boca Juniors	8
2	(Argentina) Betina Soriano	Belgrano	7
2	(Argentina) Marilyn Esquivel	Gimnasia y Esgrima (LP)	7
4	(Argentina) Nadia Fernández	Banfield	6
5	(Argentina) Valentina Barroso	Independiente	5
5	(Argentina) Agostina Holzheier	Racing	5
5	(Venezuela) Kimberlyn Campos	San Luis FC	5
5	(Argentina) Melina Salinas	San Luis FC	5

Source: Muchachas on Instagram

== Torneo Clausura ==
The Torneo Clausura will be the second tournament of the season. It will begin on August 4 and will end on 8 December.

=== Standings ===
Pos	Team	Pld	W	D	L	GF	GA	GD	Pts	Qualification
1	San Lorenzo	17	14	3	0	24	8	+16	45	Qualification for Copa Libertadores Femenina qualification play-off
2	Racing	17	11	4	2	41	16	+25	37	
3	Boca Juniors	17	10	6	1	48	13	+35	36	
4	UAI Urquiza	17	10	3	4	34	16	+18	33	
5	Gimnasia y Esgrima (LP)	17	10	2	5	28	26	+2	32	
6	Newell's Old Boys	17	9	4	4	26	13	+13	31	
7	Belgrano	17	8	3	6	22	16	+6	27	
8	Banfield	17	7	2	8	24	21	+3	23	
9	River Plate	17	5	6	6	27	25	+2	21	
10	Independiente	17	5	6	6	18	25	−7	21	
11	San Luis FC	17	4	8	5	31	29	+2	20	
12	Platense	17	5	3	9	19	24	−5	18	
13	Ferro Carril Oeste	17	4	5	8	23	20	+3	17	
14	Huracán	17	4	5	8	24	34	−10	17	
15	Estudiantes (BA)	17	3	6	8	20	31	−11	15	
16	Rosario Central	17	4	2	11	22	30	−8	14	
17	SAT	17	2	5	10	12	26	−14	11	
18	Excursionistas	17	1	1	15	6	76	−70	4	

Updated to match(es) played on 12 December 2024. Source: AFA
Rules for classification: 1) points; 2) goal difference; 3) goals scored; 4) head-to-head results; 5) fair play ranking 6) drawing of lots.

== Copa Libertadores Femenina qualification ==
The winners of the Apertura tournament and the winners of the Clausura tournament will face each other in a play-off match in order to qualify for the 2025 Copa Libertadores Femenina. It is expected to take place on December 15. If the same team wins both tournaments it will automatically qualify to the competition.

== Aggregate table ==
In this season, relegation will be determined by an aggregate table of the Apertura and Clausura tournaments. The bottom four teams will be relegated to the 2025 Primera División B. If two or more teams are level on points, extra matches will be played to decide which team will be relegated.

Pos	Team	Pld	W	D	L	GF	GA	GD	Pts	Relegation
1	Boca Juniors	17	14	3	0	49	6	+43	45	
2	Racing	17	10	6	1	33	10	+23	36	
3	River Plate	17	11	3	3	33	15	+18	36	
4	Belgrano	17	9	5	3	27	12	+15	32	
5	Ferro Carril Oeste	17	9	4	4	32	19	+13	31	
6	San Luis FC	17	7	7	3	25	17	+8	28	
7	Gimnasia y Esgrima (LP)	17	7	5	5	28	19	+9	26	
8	Independiente	17	7	4	6	18	24	−6	25	
9	San Lorenzo	17	7	3	7	23	20	+3	24	
10	Banfield	17	7	3	7	21	22	−1	24	
11	UAI Urquiza	17	7	2	8	20	21	−1	23	
12	Newell's Old Boys	17	7	2	8	19	22	−3	23	
13	SAT	17	6	2	9	19	21	−2	20	
14	Platense	17	3	8	6	14	19	−5	17	
15	Rosario Central	17	4	3	10	9	26	−17	15	Relegation to Primera División B
16	Estudiantes (BA)	17	3	3	11	15	32	−17	12	Relegation to Primera División B
17	Huracán	17	3	1	13	11	25	−14	10	Relegation to Primera División B
18	Excursionistas	17	0	0	17	3	63	−60	0	Relegation to Primera División B

Updated to match(es) played on 23 July 2024. Source: AFA
Rules for classification: 1) points; 2) goal difference; 3) goals scored; 4) head-to-head results; 5) fair play ranking 6) drawing of lots.
