= 2025 Copa América Femenina squads =

List of players competing at the 10th edition of the Copa América Femenina

This article lists the squads for the 2025 Copa América Femenina, the 10th edition of the Copa América Femenina. The tournament is a quadrennial women's international football tournament for national teams in South America organised by CONMEBOL, and was held in Ecuador from 11 July to 2 August 2025. In the tournament there were ten national teams involved. Each national team registered a squad of 23 players.

The age listed for each player is on 11 July 2025, the first day of the tournament. The numbers of caps and goals listed for each player do not include any matches played after the start of tournament. The club listed is the club for which the player last played a competitive match prior to the tournament. The nationality for each club reflects the national association (not the league) to which the club is affiliated. A flag is included for coaches that are of a different nationality than their own national team.

== Group A ==
=== Argentina ===
The squad was announced on 27 June 2025.

Head coach: Germán Portanova

No.	Pos.	Player	Date of birth (age)	Club
1	GK	Solana Pereyra	5 April 1999 (aged 26)	(Argentine Football Association) San Lorenzo
2	DF	Adriana Sachs	25 December 1993 (aged 31)	(Argentine Football Association) Racing
3	DF	Eliana Stábile	26 November 1993 (aged 31)	(Argentine Football Association) Boca Juniors
4	DF	Catalina Roggerone	3 April 2003 (aged 22)	(United States Soccer Federation) CSUB Roadrunners
5	MF	Vanina Preininger	26 September 1996 (aged 28)	(Argentine Football Association) San Lorenzo
6	DF	Aldana Cometti (captain)	3 March 1996 (aged 29)	(Royal Spanish Football Federation) Madrid CFF
7	FW	Margarita Giménez	1 November 2004 (aged 20)	(Argentine Football Association) Ferro Carril Oeste
8	MF	Daiana Falfán	14 October 2000 (aged 24)	(Argentine Football Association) Newell's Old Boys
9	FW	Kishi Núñez	17 May 2006 (aged 19)	(Argentine Football Association) Boca Juniors
10	MF	Maricel Pereyra	11 May 2002 (aged 23)	(Argentine Football Association) San Lorenzo
11	FW	Yamila Rodríguez	24 January 1998 (aged 27)	(Brazilian Football Confederation) Grêmio
12	GK	Renata Masciarelli	23 January 1997 (aged 28)	(Mexican Football Federation) Juárez
13	DF	Sophia Braun	26 January 2000 (aged 25)	(United States Soccer Federation) Spokane Zephyr FC
14	DF	Milagros Martín	26 April 2007 (aged 18)	(Argentine Football Association) Newell's Old Boys
15	MF	Florencia Bonsegundo	14 July 1993 (aged 31)	(Royal Spanish Football Federation) Madrid CFF
16	MF	Sofía Domínguez	16 December 2005 (aged 19)	(Argentine Football Association) Newell's Old Boys
17	FW	Francisca Altgelt	11 May 2006 (aged 19)	(Argentine Football Association) River Plate
18	FW	Carolina Troncoso	28 February 1991 (aged 34)	(Argentine Football Association) Boca Juniors
19	MF	Agostina Holzheier	30 September 2003 (aged 21)	(Argentine Football Association) Racing
20	DF	Virginia Gómez	26 February 1991 (aged 34)	(Argentine Football Association) San Lorenzo
21	FW	Paulina Gramaglia	21 March 2003 (aged 22)	(Brazilian Football Confederation) Red Bull Bragantino
22	FW	Betina Soriano	1 March 1994 (aged 31)	(Argentine Football Association) Belgrano
23	GK	Abigaíl Chaves	11 July 1997 (aged 28)	(Football Federation of Chile) Universidad de Chile

=== Chile ===
The squad was announced on 19 June 2025. Due to injury, Millaray Cortés was replaced by Anaís Álvarez.

Head coach: Luis Mena

No.	Pos.	Player	Date of birth (age)	Club
1	GK	Antonia Canales	16 October 2002 (aged 22)	(Royal Spanish Football Federation) Valencia
2	DF	Michelle Acevedo	4 April 2002 (aged 23)	(Football Federation of Chile) Colo-Colo
3	DF	Fernanda Ramírez	30 August 1992 (aged 32)	(Football Federation of Chile) Universidad Católica
4	DF	Catalina Figueroa	28 January 2005 (aged 20)	(Football Federation of Chile) Universidad Católica
5	MF	Nayadet López Opazo	5 August 1994 (aged 30)	(Royal Spanish Football Federation) Alavés Gloriosas
6	MF	Yastin Jiménez	17 October 2000 (aged 24)	(Football Federation of Chile) Colo-Colo
7	FW	Yenny Acuña	18 May 1997 (aged 28)	(Football Federation of Chile) Colo-Colo
8	MF	Karen Araya (captain)	16 October 1990 (aged 34)	(Royal Spanish Football Federation) Madrid CFF
9	FW	Sonya Keefe	11 April 2003 (aged 22)	(Royal Spanish Football Federation) DUX Logroño
10	MF	Yanara Aedo	5 August 1993 (aged 31)	(Football Federation of Chile) Colo-Colo
11	MF	Yessenia López	20 October 1990 (aged 34)	(Football Federation of Chile) Colo-Colo
12	GK	Ryann Torrero	1 September 1990 (aged 34)	(Football Federation of Chile) Colo-Colo
13	DF	Claudia Salfate	6 August 2003 (aged 21)	(Football Federation of Chile) Coquimbo Unido
14	FW	Vaitiare Pardo	20 August 2007 (aged 17)	(Football Federation of Chile) Universidad Católica
15	MF	Gisela Pino	1 September 1992 (aged 32)	(Peruvian Football Federation) Universitario
16	FW	Franchesca Caniguán	15 November 1999 (aged 25)	(Football Federation of Chile) Universidad de Chile
17	DF	Fernanda Pinilla	6 November 1993 (aged 31)	(Mexican Football Federation) León
18	DF	Camila Sáez	17 October 1994 (aged 30)	(The Football Association) West Ham United
19	FW	Pamela Cabezas	10 July 2007 (aged 18)	(Football Federation of Chile) Universidad Católica
20	MF	Anaís Álvarez	4 July 2007 (aged 18)	(Football Federation of Chile) Colo-Colo
21	FW	Mary Valencia	8 February 2003 (aged 22)	(Football Federation of Chile) Colo-Colo
22	DF	Rosario Balmaceda	26 March 1999 (aged 26)	(Football Federation of Chile) Colo-Colo
23	GK	Gabriela Bórquez	27 December 1998 (aged 26)	(Peruvian Football Federation) Universitario

=== Ecuador ===
The squad was announced on 2 July 2025.

Head coach: Eduardo Moscoso

No.	Pos.	Player	Date of birth (age)	Club
1	GK	Kathya Mendoza	20 June 2001 (aged 24)	(Ecuadorian Football Federation) Independiente del Valle
2	DF	Mayerli Rodríguez	26 December 2001 (aged 23)	(Ecuadorian Football Federation) Independiente del Valle
3	DF	Ariana Lomas	17 January 2002 (aged 23)	(Ecuadorian Football Federation) LDU Quito
4	DF	Justine Cuadra	17 August 1998 (aged 26)	(Ecuadorian Football Federation) Barcelona
5	MF	Stefany Cedeño	6 August 2000 (aged 24)	(Colombian Football Federation) Atlético Nacional
6	DF	Noemí Camacho	10 April 2007 (aged 18)	(Ecuadorian Football Federation) Universidad Católica
7	FW	Emily Arias	16 March 2003 (aged 22)	(Brazilian Football Confederation) América Mineiro
8	MF	Evelyn Burgos	19 April 2007 (aged 18)	(Ecuadorian Football Federation) Independiente del Valle
9	FW	Nayely Bolaños	25 February 2003 (aged 22)	(Mexican Football Federation) UNAM
10	MF	Joselyn Espinales	19 January 1999 (aged 26)	(Brazilian Football Confederation) Palmeiras
11	FW	Karen Flores	24 July 2001 (aged 23)	(Mexican Football Federation) Atlas
12	GK	Andrea Morán	14 October 1999 (aged 25)	(Argentine Football Association) Ferro Carril Oeste
13	FW	Nicole Charcopa	1 April 2000 (aged 25)	(Ecuadorian Football Federation) Independiente del Valle
14	DF	Fiorella Pico	10 June 2007 (aged 18)	(Ecuadorian Football Federation) Independiente del Valle
15	MF	Manoly Baquerizo	15 December 1998 (aged 26)	(Royal Spanish Football Federation) Alavés Gloriosas
16	DF	Ligia Moreira (captain)	19 March 1992 (aged 33)	(Royal Spanish Football Federation) Alba Fundación
17	MF	Maylin Arreaga	22 April 2000 (aged 25)	(Ecuadorian Football Federation) Barcelona
18	MF	Rosa Flores	26 June 2006 (aged 19)	(Ecuadorian Football Federation) LDU Quito
19	MF	Kerlly Real	7 November 1998 (aged 26)	(Royal Spanish Football Federation) Valencia
20	DF	Danna Pesántez	29 August 2003 (aged 21)	(Mexican Football Federation) Querétaro
21	FW	Milagro Barahona	20 June 2002 (aged 23)	(Ecuadorian Football Federation) Universidad Católica
22	GK	Liceth Suárez	17 September 1996 (aged 28)	(Ecuadorian Football Federation) LDU Quito
23	MF	Jessy Caicedo	4 July 1999 (aged 26)	(Ecuadorian Football Federation) Ñañas

=== Peru ===
The squad was announced on 16 June 2025.

Head coach: (Portugal) Emily Lima

No.	Pos.	Player	Date of birth (age)	Club
1	GK	Savannah Madden	2 February 1999 (aged 26)	(Swedish Football Association) Vittsjö GIK
2	DF	Gianella Romero	22 October 2002 (aged 22)	(Peruvian Football Federation) Alianza Lima
3	DF	Tifani Molina	15 October 2001 (aged 23)	(Peruvian Football Federation) Alianza Lima
4	DF	Braelynn Llamoca	30 January 2002 (aged 23)	(United States Soccer Federation) CA Internacional
5	DF	Rosa Castro	27 April 1995 (aged 30)	(Peruvian Football Federation) Alianza Lima
6	MF	Claudia Cagnina	10 September 1997 (aged 27)	(Norwegian Football Federation) Bodø/Glimt
7	FW	Sandy Dorador	4 January 1989 (aged 36)	(Peruvian Football Federation) Alianza Lima
8	MF	Geraldine Cisneros	12 March 1996 (aged 29)	(Peruvian Football Federation) Universitario
9	FW	Pierina Núñez	13 March 2000 (aged 25)	(Peruvian Football Federation) Universitario
10	MF	Alondra Vílchez	16 March 1997 (aged 28)	(Peruvian Football Federation) Universitario
11	FW	Xioczana Canales	21 April 1999 (aged 26)	(Peruvian Football Federation) Universitario
12	GK	Maryory Sánchez	7 April 1997 (aged 28)	(Peruvian Football Federation) Alianza Lima
13	MF	Mia León	22 March 2005 (aged 20)	(Royal Spanish Football Federation) Madrid CFF
14	MF	Scarleth Flores	12 August 1996 (aged 28)	(Peruvian Football Federation) Universitario
15	MF	Emily Flores	10 September 1990 (aged 34)	(Peruvian Football Federation) Alianza Lima
16	FW	Yomira Tacilla	2 August 1996 (aged 28)	(Peruvian Football Federation) Alianza Lima
17	DF	Fabiola Herrera (captain)	18 June 1987 (aged 38)	(Peruvian Football Federation) Universitario
18	DF	Allison Azabache	15 December 2003 (aged 21)	(Peruvian Football Federation) Alianza Lima
19	FW	Birka Ruiz	27 July 2005 (aged 19)	(Peruvian Football Federation) Alianza Lima
20	FW	Valerie Gherson	28 December 2005 (aged 19)	(Peruvian Football Federation) Universitario
21	FW	Raquel Bilcape	23 August 2005 (aged 19)	(Peruvian Football Federation) Melgar
22	FW	Mia Obando	2 March 2006 (aged 19)	(United States Soccer Federation) Bay Area Surf
23	GK	Lucía Arcos	12 February 2004 (aged 21)	(Royal Spanish Football Federation) Terrassa

=== Uruguay ===
The squad was announced on 13 June 2025. Due to injury, Solange Lemos was replaced by Alison Latúa.

Head coach: Ariel Longo

No.	Pos.	Player	Date of birth (age)	Club
1	GK	Romina Olmedo	7 October 2006 (aged 18)	(Uruguayan Football Association) Defensor Sporting
2	DF	Stephanie Lacoste	9 September 1996 (aged 28)	(Brazilian Football Confederation) Internacional
3	DF	Daiana Farías	26 January 1999 (aged 26)	(Uruguayan Football Association) Peñarol
4	DF	Carina Felipe	3 March 1998 (aged 27)	(Argentine Football Association) Newell's Old Boys
5	MF	Micaela Fitipaldi	22 September 1999 (aged 25)	(Uruguayan Football Association) Nacional
6	MF	Sindy Ramírez	28 January 1991 (aged 34)	(Argentine Football Association) Racing
7	DF	Stephanie Tregartten	13 October 1997 (aged 27)	(Royal Spanish Football Federation) Real Oviedo
8	MF	Ximena Velazco	31 July 1995 (aged 29)	(Royal Spanish Football Federation) DUX Logroño
9	MF	Pamela González (captain)	28 September 1995 (aged 29)	(Royal Spanish Football Federation) Sevilla
10	FW	Belén Aquino	1 February 2002 (aged 23)	(Brazilian Football Confederation) Internacional
11	FW	Esperanza Pizarro	15 April 2001 (aged 24)	(Royal Spanish Football Federation) Eibar
12	GK	Agustina Sánchez	11 September 1999 (aged 25)	(Argentine Football Association) Belgrano
13	GK	Sofía Olivera	14 August 1991 (aged 33)	(Argentine Football Association) Gimnasia y Esgrima (LP)
14	FW	Alaides Paz	27 May 1996 (aged 29)	(Argentine Football Association) Belgrano
15	DF	Fátima Barone	17 September 1999 (aged 25)	(Argentine Football Association) Belgrano
16	DF	Yannel Correa	10 September 1996 (aged 28)	(Royal Spanish Football Federation) Alhama
17	MF	Pilar González	29 June 2002 (aged 23)	(Argentine Football Association) Talleres
18	DF	Alison Latúa	23 May 2003 (aged 22)	(Uruguayan Football Association) Nacional
19	FW	Wendy Carballo	28 July 2002 (aged 22)	(Brazilian Football Confederation) Bahia
20	MF	Ángela Gómez	19 August 2002 (aged 22)	(Brazilian Football Confederation) Bahia
21	DF	Juliana Viera	8 May 2002 (aged 23)	(United States Soccer Federation) East Carolina Pirates
22	MF	Ilana Guedes	13 March 2007 (aged 18)	(Uruguayan Football Association) Liverpool
23	FW	Yamila Dornelles	9 July 2006 (aged 19)	(Uruguayan Football Association) Nacional

== Group B ==
=== Bolivia ===
The squad was announced on 5 July 2025.

Head coach: (Argentina) Rosana Gómez

No.	Pos.	Player	Date of birth (age)	Club
1	GK	Jodi Medina	25 February 1999 (aged 26)	(United States Soccer Federation) Futbolera Select
2	DF	Eyda Serrudo	10 April 2000 (aged 25)	(Bolivian Football Federation) Inter Stars Rush
3	DF	Aidé Mendiola	14 November 2000 (aged 24)	(Bolivian Football Federation) C.D. Bustillos Presto
4	DF	Lucerito Bravo	18 July 2005 (aged 19)	(Bolivian Football Federation) Inter Stars Rush
5	DF	Érika Salvatierra (captain)	3 May 1990 (aged 35)	(Royal Spanish Football Federation) Caday Fuerteventura
6	MF	Yaneth Viveros	21 January 1993 (aged 32)	(Argentine Football Association) Rosario Central
7	MF	Samantha Alurralde	4 January 2004 (aged 21)	(Argentine Football Association) San Luis FC
8	MF	Ángela Cárdenas	19 November 1993 (aged 31)	(Royal Spanish Football Federation) Real Murcia
9	FW	Marlene Flores	23 April 2001 (aged 24)	(United States Soccer Federation) MVC Vikings
10	MF	Abigail Quiroz	10 December 2001 (aged 23)	(Royal Spanish Football Federation) Real Oviedo
11	FW	Emilie Doerksen	3 October 2001 (aged 23)	(United States Soccer Federation) West Florida Argonauts
12	GK	Hillary Saavedra	8 April 2000 (aged 25)	(Bolivian Football Federation) Real Tomayapo
13	FW	Ivana Siles	4 October 2001 (aged 23)	(United States Soccer Federation) Nebraska–Kearney Lopers
14	FW	Ana Paula Rojas	17 July 1997 (aged 27)	(Bolivian Football Federation) Bolívar
15	MF	Angelina Rivero	25 September 2008 (aged 16)	(Bolivian Football Federation) Calleja
16	MF	Anabel Flores	19 November 2005 (aged 19)	(Bolivian Football Federation) Oriente Petrolero
17	FW	Briseyda Orellana	1 June 2004 (aged 21)	(Bolivian Football Federation) Exótico Premium
18	MF	Nelly Carballo	12 February 2007 (aged 18)	(Bolivian Football Federation) Deportivo Trópico
19	FW	Carla Méndez	30 January 1997 (aged 28)	(Bolivian Football Federation) Club Esperanza
20	DF	María José Bravo	23 September 2001 (aged 23)	(Bolivian Football Federation) 24 de Septiembre
21	DF	Jaise Nina	5 December 2009 (aged 15)	(Bolivian Football Federation) Exótico Premium
22	MF	Alison Mamani	3 November 1999 (aged 25)	(Bolivian Football Federation) Always Ready
23	GK	Érika Sánchez	2 August 2003 (aged 21)	(Bolivian Football Federation) Astor

=== Brazil ===
The squad was announced on 9 June 2025. Due to injury, Ana Vitória was replaced by Vitória Yaya.

Head coach: Arthur Elias

No.	Pos.	Player	Date of birth (age)	Club
1	GK	Lorena	6 May 1997 (aged 28)	(United States Soccer Federation) Kansas City Current
2	DF	Antônia	26 April 1994 (aged 31)	(Royal Spanish Football Federation) Real Madrid
3	DF	Tarciane	27 May 2003 (aged 22)	(French Football Federation) Lyon
4	DF	Kaká	2 August 1999 (aged 25)	(Brazilian Football Confederation) São Paulo
5	MF	Duda Sampaio	18 May 2001 (aged 24)	(Brazilian Football Confederation) Corinthians
6	DF	Yasmim	28 October 1996 (aged 28)	(Royal Spanish Football Federation) Real Madrid
7	FW	Kerolin	17 November 1999 (aged 25)	(The Football Association) Manchester City
8	MF	Angelina	26 January 2000 (aged 25)	(United States Soccer Federation) Orlando Pride
9	FW	Amanda Gutierres	18 March 2001 (aged 24)	(Brazilian Football Confederation) Palmeiras
10	FW	Marta (captain)	19 February 1986 (aged 39)	(United States Soccer Federation) Orlando Pride
11	FW	Gio Garbelini	21 June 2003 (aged 22)	(Royal Spanish Football Federation) Atlético Madrid
12	GK	Camila Rodrigues	2 January 2001 (aged 24)	(Brazilian Football Confederation) Cruzeiro
13	DF	Fe Palermo	18 August 1996 (aged 28)	(Brazilian Football Confederation) Palmeiras
14	GK	Cláudia	22 July 2002 (aged 22)	(Brazilian Football Confederation) Fluminense
15	MF	Ary Borges	28 December 1999 (aged 25)	(United States Soccer Federation) Racing Louisville
16	DF	Fátima Dutra	8 December 1999 (aged 25)	(Brazilian Football Confederation) Ferroviária
17	MF	Vitória Yaya	23 January 2002 (aged 23)	(Brazilian Football Confederation) Corinthians
18	FW	Gabi Portilho	18 July 1995 (aged 29)	(United States Soccer Federation) Gotham FC
19	FW	Jhonson	13 October 2005 (aged 19)	(Brazilian Football Confederation) Corinthians
20	DF	Mariza	8 November 2001 (aged 23)	(Brazilian Football Confederation) Corinthians
21	FW	Dudinha	4 July 2005 (aged 20)	(Brazilian Football Confederation) São Paulo
22	FW	Luany	3 February 2003 (aged 22)	(Royal Spanish Football Federation) Atlético Madrid
23	DF	Isa Haas	20 January 2001 (aged 24)	(Brazilian Football Confederation) Cruzeiro

=== Colombia ===
The squad was announced on 7 July 2025. Due to injury, Natalia Giraldo was replaced by Luisa Agudelo.

Head coach: Ángelo Marsiglia

No.	Pos.	Player	Date of birth (age)	Club
1	GK	Catalina Pérez	8 November 1994 (aged 30)	(German Football Association) Werder Bremen
2	DF	Mary Álvarez	22 August 2005 (aged 19)	(Colombian Football Federation) Atlético Nacional
3	DF	Daniela Arias	31 August 1994 (aged 30)	(United States Soccer Federation) San Diego Wave FC
4	DF	Ana María Guzmán	11 June 2005 (aged 20)	(United States Soccer Federation) Utah Royals
5	MF	Lorena Bedoya	6 October 1997 (aged 27)	(Brazilian Football Confederation) Cruzeiro
6	MF	Daniela Montoya (captain)	22 August 1990 (aged 34)	(Brazilian Football Confederation) Grêmio
7	FW	Manuela Paví	23 December 2000 (aged 24)	(The Football Association) West Ham United
8	MF	Marcela Restrepo	10 November 1995 (aged 29)	(Mexican Football Federation) Monterrey
9	FW	Mayra Ramírez	25 March 1999 (aged 26)	(The Football Association) Chelsea
10	MF	Leicy Santos	16 May 1996 (aged 29)	(United States Soccer Federation) Washington Spirit
11	MF	Catalina Usme	25 December 1989 (aged 35)	(Turkish Football Federation) Galatasaray
12	GK	Katherine Tapia	7 December 1992 (aged 32)	(Brazilian Football Confederation) Palmeiras
13	GK	Luisa Agudelo	27 March 2007 (aged 18)	(Colombian Football Federation) Deportivo Cali
14	DF	Ángela Barón	18 September 2003 (aged 21)	(United States Soccer Federation) Racing Louisville FC
15	FW	Wendy Bonilla	8 July 2002 (aged 23)	(Mexican Football Federation) UNAM
16	DF	Jorelyn Carabalí	18 May 1997 (aged 28)	(The Football Association) Brighton & Hove Albion
17	DF	Carolina Arias	2 September 1990 (aged 34)	(Colombian Football Federation) América de Cali
18	FW	Linda Caicedo	22 February 2005 (aged 20)	(Royal Spanish Football Federation) Real Madrid
19	DF	Yirleidis Minota	10 November 2002 (aged 22)	(Mexican Football Federation) Pachuca
20	MF	Ilana Izquierdo	14 June 2002 (aged 23)	(United States Soccer Federation) Mississippi State Bulldogs
21	FW	Valerin Loboa	3 July 2007 (aged 18)	(Colombian Football Federation) Deportivo Cali
22	DF	Daniela Caracas	25 April 1997 (aged 28)	(Royal Spanish Football Federation) Espanyol
23	FW	Liced Serna	1 February 2002 (aged 23)	(Royal Spanish Football Federation) Alba Fundación

=== Paraguay ===
The squad was announced on 25 June 2025.

Head coach: (Brazil) Fábio Fukumoto

No.	Pos.	Player	Date of birth (age)	Club
1	GK	Cristina Recalde	29 March 1994 (aged 31)	(Royal Spanish Football Federation) Guiniguada Apolinario
2	DF	Camila Barbosa	18 February 2002 (aged 23)	(Brazilian Football Confederation) Bahia
3	DF	Daysy Bareiro	19 January 2001 (aged 24)	(Royal Spanish Football Federation) Sport Extremadura
4	DF	Deisy Ojeda	3 March 2000 (aged 25)	(Mexican Football Federation) Querétaro
5	MF	Dahiana Bogarín	13 November 2000 (aged 24)	(Football Federation of Chile) Colo-Colo
6	MF	Fanny Godoy	21 January 1998 (aged 27)	(Royal Spanish Football Federation) Guiniguada Apolinario
7	MF	Ramona Martínez	21 July 1996 (aged 28)	(Paraguayan Football Association) Libertad
8	MF	Celeste Aguilera	16 June 1999 (aged 26)	(Paraguayan Football Association) Olimpia
9	FW	Lice Chamorro	22 December 1998 (aged 26)	(Royal Spanish Football Federation) Espanyol
10	FW	Jessica Martínez (captain)	14 June 1999 (aged 26)	(Saudi Arabian Football Federation) Al Hilal
11	FW	Fátima Acosta	7 January 2005 (aged 20)	(Mexican Football Federation) UNAM
12	GK	Soledad Belotto	14 August 2003 (aged 21)	(Italian Football Federation) Juventus
13	DF	María Martínez	24 May 1999 (aged 26)	(Argentine Football Association) Rosario Central
14	DF	Naomi de León	6 May 2005 (aged 20)	(Paraguayan Football Association) Libertad
15	DF	Danna Garcete	21 May 2005 (aged 20)	(Paraguayan Football Association) Olimpia
16	DF	Fiorela Martínez	18 April 2002 (aged 23)	(Paraguayan Football Association) Guaraní
17	DF	Camila Arrieta	16 September 2001 (aged 23)	(Brazilian Football Confederation) 3B da Amazônia
18	FW	Claudia Martínez	15 January 2008 (aged 17)	(Paraguayan Football Association) Olimpia
19	MF	Belén Riveros	13 June 2002 (aged 23)	(Paraguayan Football Association) Cerro Porteño
20	FW	Diana Benítez	30 March 2007 (aged 18)	(Paraguayan Football Association) Libertad
21	FW	Cindy Ramos	1 November 2002 (aged 22)	(Brazilian Football Confederation) Atlético Mineiro
22	GK	Araceli Leguizamón	6 August 2005 (aged 19)	(Paraguayan Football Association) Guaraní
23	DF	Liz Barreto	4 November 2000 (aged 24)	(Paraguayan Football Association) Olimpia

=== Venezuela ===
The squad was announced on 13 June 2025.

Head coach: (Brazil) Ricardo Belli

No.	Pos.	Player	Date of birth (age)	Club
1	GK	Micheel Rengifo	21 March 1998 (aged 27)	(Argentine Football Association) Newell's Old Boys
2	DF	Verónica Herrera	14 January 2000 (aged 25)	(Royal Spanish Football Federation) AEM Lleida
3	DF	Gabriela Angulo	27 February 2004 (aged 21)	(United States Soccer Federation) Purdue Boilermakers
4	DF	María Peraza	17 January 1994 (aged 31)	(Mexican Football Federation) Santos Laguna
5	DF	Yenifer Giménez	3 May 1996 (aged 29)	(Swiss Football Association) Servette
6	DF	Michelle Romero	12 June 1997 (aged 28)	(Royal Spanish Football Federation) Fundación Canaria CD Tenerife
7	MF	Daniuska Rodríguez	4 January 1999 (aged 26)	(Portuguese Football Federation) Torreense
8	MF	Gabriela García	2 April 1997 (aged 28)	(Royal Spanish Football Federation) Atlético Madrid
9	FW	Deyna Castellanos (captain)	18 April 1999 (aged 26)	(United States Soccer Federation) Portland Thorns FC
10	FW	Joemar Guarecuco	20 June 1994 (aged 31)	(Colombian Football Federation) América de Cali
11	FW	Oriana Altuve	3 October 1992 (aged 32)	(Turkish Football Federation) Ankara BB Fomget
12	MF	Ailing Herrera	15 July 2008 (aged 16)	(Venezuelan Football Federation) Caracas
13	GK	Nayluisa Cáceres	18 November 1999 (aged 25)	(Royal Spanish Football Federation) Alhama
14	DF	Raiderlin Carrasco	11 June 2002 (aged 23)	(Royal Spanish Football Federation) Levante
15	MF	Yerliane Moreno	13 October 2000 (aged 24)	(Royal Spanish Football Federation) UD Tenerife
16	MF	Floriangel Apóstol	7 September 2005 (aged 19)	(Royal Spanish Football Federation) Deportivo La Coruña
17	DF	Camila Pescatore	23 May 2000 (aged 25)	(Royal Spanish Football Federation) As Celtas
18	FW	Ysaura Viso	17 June 1993 (aged 32)	(Brazilian Football Confederation) 3B da Amazônia
19	FW	Mariana Speckmaier	26 December 1997 (aged 27)	(Football Australia) Melbourne City
20	MF	Dayana Rodríguez	20 October 2001 (aged 23)	(Brazilian Football Confederation) Corinthians
21	FW	Bárbara Olivieri	24 February 2002 (aged 23)	(United States Soccer Federation) Houston Dash
22	GK	Valeria Rebanales	25 August 2009 (aged 15)	(Venezuelan Football Federation) ADIFFEM
23	MF	Melanie Chirinos	20 March 2008 (aged 17)	(Venezuelan Football Federation) ADIFFEM
