= Racing Club de Avellaneda (women) =

Argentine women's football club

Racing Club
- Full name: Racing Club
- Nicknames: La Academia (The Academy); Las Académicas (The Academics)
- Short name: Racing
- Founded: 1978 (first women's team); 1996 (first AFA participation)
- Ground: Predio Tita Mattiussi
- President: Diego Milito
- Manager: Héctor Bracamonte
- League: Primera División A
- Website: https://www.racingclub.com.ar/futbol/femenino/noticias
Home colours	Away colours	Third colours

Racing Club de Avellaneda Femenino is the women's football section of Racing Club, a sports club founded in 1903 and based in Avellaneda, Buenos Aires, Argentina. The team competes in the Primera División A, the highest division of women's football in Argentina.

Racing's involvement in women's football predates its official entry into Argentine Football Association (AFA) competitions in 1996. During the 1970s, the club fielded a team featuring several pioneers of the Argentine women's game and won a regional metropolitan tournament in 1978. Following an intermittent early presence—which included a brief return from 2003 to 2005—the team stepped away from organized play before permanently re-establishing its women's program for the 2017–18 season in the Primera División B. Racing earned immediate promotion to the top flight the following year, defeating Real Pilar 2–1 on aggregate in the Torneo Reducido final.

Upon returning to the top flight, Racing steadily consolidated its position among the league's elite. In 2022, the club recorded what was then its best campaign in history, finishing third in the Primera División with 47 points from 20 matches. Racing moved closer to a maiden title over the subsequent seasons, finishing runner-up in both league tournaments in 2024 and reaching another championship final in the second tournament of 2025. After winning the first leg 1–0, Racing fell 2–0 to Belgrano in the return leg in Córdoba, losing 2–1 on aggregate.

The historic breakthrough arrived in 2026 during the Torneo Apertura. Heading into the final matchday level on 35 points with San Lorenzo, Racing secured a 2–0 victory away against San Luis FC via goals from Rocío Bueno and Marleidy Cossio. San Lorenzo's defeat to Lanús that same day clinched the championship for Racing, delivering the club its first official AFA women's top-flight title. Racing completed the title-winning campaign with 38 points from 15 matches, recording 12 victories, two draws, and one defeat.

From its pioneering days in the 1970s to its historic 2026 title, Racing's women's section has evolved from intermittent appearances into a fully established top-tier contender. The 2026 Apertura championship marked the culmination of the club's structural expansion following its 2017 relaunch, cementing a strong foundation for its senior roster and youth academy.

== History ==
=== Pre-AFA era ===
Racing Club's involvement in women's football predates the organisation of official competitions by the Argentine Football Association (AFA). During the 1970s, the team was coached by Jorge Valverde and trained several times a week on an auxiliary pitch at the Cilindro. Former player Beatriz Porcel recalled that Racing commonly deployed a 4–2–4 formation, combining experienced players with a younger generation of footballers at a time when women's football in Argentina lacked official recognition and facilities were minimal.

The squad featured prominent figures of the era, including three players who had represented Argentina at the unofficial 1971 Women's World Cup in Mexico: Gloria "Betty" García, goalkeeper Marta Soler, and Virginia Cattaneo. García had notably scored in Argentina's historic 4–1 victory over England during that tournament, while Soler and Cattaneo were also key fixtures of the national side. Along with teammates such as Norma Saralegui, Beatriz Porcel, and María de los Ángeles Fernández, the core group remained together for several years.

The high point of this pioneering era came in 1978, when Racing competed in a month-long metropolitan tournament hosted at Excursionistas. Featuring clubs such as Yupanqui, Excursionistas, Minué, and San Fernando, Racing won the championship by defeating San Fernando on penalties in the final.

=== Entry into official AFA competition (1996–1997) ===
In 1996, Racing Club entered the Argentine Football Association (AFA) Campeonato de Fútbol Femenino for the first time. The nine-team championship ran from September 1996 into early 1997.

Racing made an immediate impact at the start of the tournament. The team opened its official campaign on 29 September 1996 with an 8–2 victory over cross-town rivals Independiente. Two weeks later, on 13 October, Racing defeated Boca Juniors 1–0 at the Cilindro. The home fixture against Boca was notable within contemporary Argentine women's football, as female teams were rarely granted access to main club stadiums during this period.

Despite its competitive performances, the team operated as a non-professional program with limited resources, resulting in several late-season matches being left unplayed and awarded to opponents walkover. Racing ultimately finished fourth with 22 points from 16 matches (recording seven wins, one draw, and eight losses) behind only River Plate, Boca Juniors, and Deportivo Español.

Following the 1996–97 championship, Racing did not register a team for the subsequent season. This hiatus coincided with severe institutional and financial challenges across the club during the late 1990s—which led to bankruptcy proceedings in 1998—resulting in the temporary suspension of several auxiliary and amateur sports sections.

=== Return to AFA competition and hiatus (2003–2005) ===
Following a six-year hiatus, Racing returned to official competition in late 2003, initiating a four-tournament spell through the 2005 Clausura.

The comeback began in the 13-team 2003 Apertura, where Racing finished eighth with 14 points (4 wins, 2 draws, 4 losses, with 24 goals scored and 30 conceded). The team built on this foundation during the 2004 Clausura, moving up to seventh place with 12 points across eight recorded matches.

The high point of this period arrived in the 2004 Apertura, when Racing finished sixth with 15 points (5 wins and a 27–24 goal record), trailing only traditional contenders Boca Juniors, San Lorenzo, River Plate, Gimnasia y Esgrima La Plata, and Banfield., and Banfield. The campaign was highlighted by a 5–1 victory over Estudiantes de La Plata, a 2–1 win against Huracán, a 3–2 away victory at Lugano, and a 9–0 win over Sportivo Barracas Bolívar. Racing closed the tournament with a 5–0 victory over cross-town rivals Independiente in the Avellaneda derby, securing a finish three places above their rivals.

Racing concluded this spell during the 2005 Clausura. Although surviving league records from the period remain incomplete, official club accounts confirm the team's participation, including a 1–0 away loss to Banfield. Following the tournament, Racing withdrew from the subsequent 2005 Apertura and stepped away from AFA competition for twelve years prior to its permanent relaunch in 2017.

=== Relaunch and Top-Flight Ascent (2017–Present) ===
Racing returned to official women's football in 2017 and entered the 2017–18 season of the Primera División B. The comeback quickly became a triumphant promotion campaign. Racing finished fourth in the regular-season standings with 82 points from 34 matches to qualify for the Torneo Reducido, which determined the final promotion place. In the knockout phase, Racing defeated Puerto Nuevo 2–0 in the quarter-finals and eliminated Lima on penalties after a 1–1 draw in the semi-final. In the final, the club defeated Real Pilar 2–1 on aggregate—winning the first leg 2–0 at the Predio Tita Mattiussi—to secure a swift return to the top tier.

Racing's return to the Primera División was immediately competitive. In the 2018–19 championship, the team capped a dominant opening stage at the top of Zone A with 22 points from nine matches, recording seven wins, one draw, and just one defeat while conceding only three goals. That performance qualified Racing for the elite Fase Campeonato alongside the country's leading clubs. During this landmark campaign, in March 2019, the AFA officially declared the full professionalization of the Primera División A, establishing a formal professional framework for top-flight clubs. Facing top-tier opposition in the championship phase, Racing finished sixth with nine points from 14 matches.

The club's most significant breakthrough arrived in 2022, as Racing established itself as a true domestic power. Racing claimed third place in the Primera División with a record-setting 47 points from 20 matches (15 wins, two draws, and three losses). Scoring 48 goals and conceding just 16, the team completed the finest top-flight campaign in the history of Racing's women's section. The campaign featured statement victories over traditional powerhouses San Lorenzo, River Plate, and Independiente, making Racing the first club outside the established "big four" of Boca Juniors, River Plate, UAI Urquiza, and San Lorenzo to break into the top four since 2013.

That same year, Racing also featured in the national Copa Federal, facing eventual finalists Belgrano in a hard-fought round of 16 encounter that ended 1–1 before Belgrano narrowly advanced on penalties.

Racing's rapid rise and institutional modernization were further demonstrated by landmark player transfers to international leagues. In August 2022, star striker and captain Rocío Bueno completed a historic move to Italian Serie A side Sassuolo. The transfer marked a milestone in Argentine women's football, as Bueno became the first player in national history whose overseas transfer generated a direct fee for her parent club (€2,000 loan fee with a €25,000 purchase option).

In July 2023, defender Luana Muñoz signed a two-year contract with Celtic Women, becoming the first Argentine footballer to play in the Scottish Women's Premier League, with Racing retaining a 20 per cent sell-on clause. This international expansion continued when playmaker Agostina Holzheier secured a transfer to NWSL side Bay FC in the United States, further establishing the club's reputation as a developer of talent for top global leagues.

The period beginning in 2017 marked a complete transformation. Racing executed a rapid ascent from the second division into the top flight, established itself as an elite contender in the professionalized Primera División, set club point records, and pioneered international player transfers that set new standards across Argentine women's football.

=== 2026 Apertura: First AFA title ===
Building on its runner-up finish in the second tournament of 2025, Racing entered 2026 under head coach Héctor Bracamonte with much of its squad intact. The 2026 Torneo Apertura of the Primera División A featured 16 teams competing in a single round-robin format.

Racing opened the campaign on 15 March with a 6–0 victory over Lanús at the Predio Tita Mattiussi. Five days later, the team secured a 3–2 away win against Boca Juniors—headlined by a long-range goal from Rocío Bueno—to take early possession of first place. Racing maintained its lead through the autumn, recording a 1–0 win over San Lorenzo and a 4–0 victory away to Banfield in June. In round ten, Racing recovered from an early second-half deficit against River Plate, winning 3–1 following two goals from Agostina Holzheier and a late strike by team captain Sindy Ramírez.

By July, the title race had narrowed to a head-to-head contest with San Lorenzo. A 3–1 victory over rivals Independiente in the Avellaneda derby kept Racing level on points at the top. In the penultimate round against Unión, Marleidy Cossio scored a 94th-minute header to seal a 2–1 victory and preserve the tie at the summit.

The championship was decided on the final matchday, 22 July 2026. Playing away to San Luis FC, Racing won 2–0 through second-half goals from Bueno and Cossio. Coupled with San Lorenzo's defeat to Lanús that same afternoon, Racing clinched the title outright by three points, ending the tournament with 38 points from 15 matches (12 wins, two draws, one loss).

The victory marked the first official AFA top-flight title in the history of Racing's women's section, coming three decades after the club's official AFA debut in 1996.

== Players ==
=== Current squad ===
As of 26 September 2026.

Note: Flags indicate national team as defined under FIFA eligibility rules; some limited exceptions apply. Players may hold more than one non-FIFA nationality.

No.	Pos.	Nation	Player
1	GK	ARG	Carolina Andrea Sailer
2	MF	ARG	Melina Moreno
3	DF	ARG	Luciana Pérez
4	DF	ARG	Milagros Otazú
5	MF	ARG	Gabriela Evangelina Herrera
6	DF	ARG	Valentina Nerea González
7	FW	ARG	Agustina Pacheco Etchart
8	MF	ARG	Rocío Vázquez
9	FW	ARG	Rocío Bueno
10	MF	URU	Sindy Ramírez (captain)
11	FW	ARG	Thalía Araujo
12	GK	PAR	Alicia Bobadilla

No.	Pos.	Nation	Player
15	DF	ARG	Abril Reche
18	GK	ARG	Tatiana Cáceres
19	FW	COL	Marleidy Cossio
20	MF	ARG	Rebeca Trebotic
22	DF	ARG	Serena Rodríguez
25	DF	ARG	Florencia Núñez
28	MF	ARG	Katalina Luz Chaparro
31	DF	ARG	Dolores Maregatti
32	DF	ARG	Cindy Piana
33	DF	ARG	Eugenia Nardone
35	DF	ARG	Adriana María Sachs
