= Vanina Correa =

Argentine footballer (born 1983)

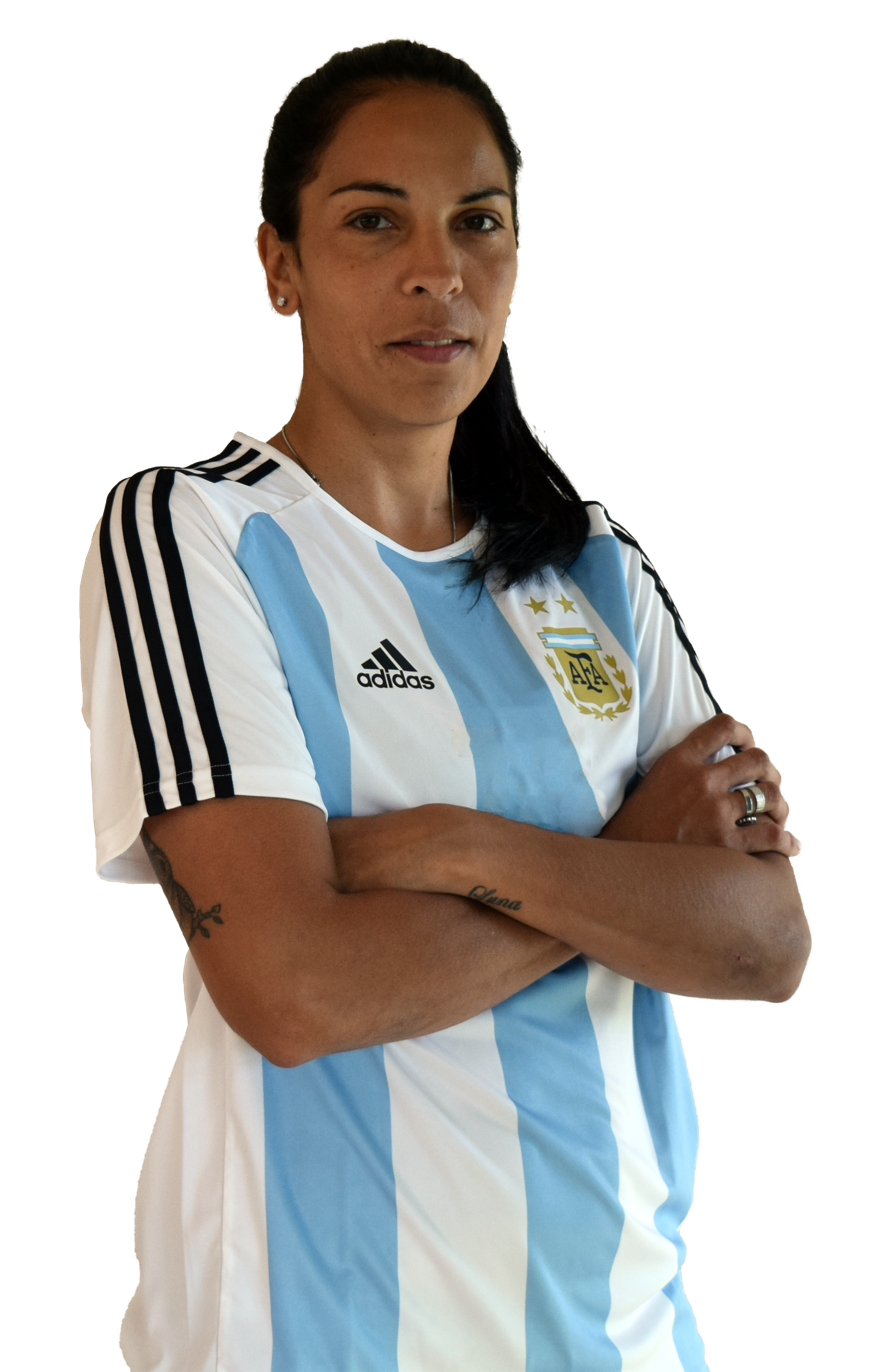

Personal information
- Full name: Vanina Noemí Correa
- Date of birth: August 14, 1983 (age 43)
- Place of birth: Villa Gobernador Gálvez, Argentina
- Height: 1.80 m (5 ft 11 in)
- Position: Goalkeeper

Senior career*
Years	Team	Apps	(Gls)
2000–2002	Rosario Central		
2002–2003	Banfield		
2003–2005	Boca Juniors		
2005–2008	Banfield		
2008–2009	Boca Juniors		
2009	Renato Cesarini		
2015	Rosario Central		
2016–2018	Social Lux		
2019	Rosario Central		
2019–2020	San Lorenzo		
2020–2021	Espanyol	8	(0)
2021	San Lorenzo		
2022–2024	Rosario Central	0	(0)
2022	→ Universidad de Chile (loan)		

International career^{‡}
2003–2023	Argentina	41	(0)
Medal record
Women's football
Representing Argentina
Copa América Femenina
Runner-up	2003 Peru
Winner	2006 Argentina
Third place	2018 Chile
Third place	2022 Colombia
Pan American Games
Silver medal – second place	2019 Lima	Team
- * Club domestic league appearances and goals ‡ National team caps and goals as of 8 April 2021

Vanina Noemí Correa (born 14 August 1983) is an Argentine former footballer who played as a goalkeeper.

== Club career ==
Correa has played for Renato Cesarini, Boca Juniors, Social Lux, Rosario Central and San Lorenzo in her country.

In the second half of 2022, she had a stint on loan with Universidad de Chile.

== International career ==
She played the inaugural match of the 2007 FIFA Women's World Cup against Germany, which Argentina lost 11–0, the biggest defeat in the history of the tournament until Thailand lost 13–0 to the United States in 2019. The following year she was the starting goalkeeper in the 2008 Summer Olympics women's football tournament.

When Argentina failed to qualify for the 2011 FIFA Women's World Cup, Correa retired from football the following year. She was persuaded into a national team comeback in 2017, when coach Carlos Borrello encountered her at a domestic fixture. She played in all seven of Argentina's matches at the 2018 Copa América Femenina and in both legs of the subsequent CONCACAF–CONMEBOL play-off win over Panama.

At the 2019 FIFA Women's World Cup Correa won acclaim for her performance in Argentina's 1–0 defeat by England in Le Havre. She made six saves including a penalty kick from Nikita Parris. English coach Phil Neville was effusive in his praise: "Their goalkeeper was incredible. I saw her before the game and she was unbelievable, even in the warm-up. What you've seen tonight is an unbelievable goalkeeping performance." The BBC Sport report described Correa's display as "a form of redemption", after her unhappy experiences at the 2003 and 2007 editions of the tournament.

== Personal life ==
On 24 February 2014, Correa gave birth to twins, who are the result of fertility treatments she did, in the company of her partner at that time.

== International Tournaments ==
Championship	Country	Result
2003 South American Women's Football Championship	Peru	Runners-up
2006 South American Women's Football Championship	Argentina	Winners
Football at the 2003 Pan American Games – Women's tournament	Dominican Republic	Fourth Place
Football at the 2007 Pan American Games – Women's tournament	Brazil	Group stage
2003 FIFA Women's World Cup	United States	Group stage
2007 FIFA Women's World Cup	China	Group stage
Football at the 2008 Summer Olympics – Women's tournament	China	Group stage
2018 Copa América Femenina	Chile	Third Place
2019 FIFA Women's World Cup	France	Group Stage
2019 Pan American Games	Peru	Runners-up
