= Crisely Pavón =

Argentine footballer (born 2001)

Personal information
- Full name: Stephanie Crisely Pavón
- Date of birth: 17 January 2001 (age 25)
- Place of birth: The Woodlands, Texas, U.S.
- Height: 1.60 m (5 ft 3 in)
- Position: Midfielder

Team information
- Current team: Belgrano
- Number: 14

College career
Years	Team	Apps	(Gls)
2019-2021	Texas Southern Tigers		
2022	Lamar Lady Cardinals		

Senior career*
Years	Team	Apps	(Gls)
2024	San Luis FC		
2025	Belgrano		
2026-	San Lorenzo		

International career^{‡}
2025-	Argentina	2	(0)
- * Club domestic league appearances and goals as of 8 November 2025 ‡ National team caps and goals as of 20 April 2024

Stephanie Crisely Pavón (born 17 January 2001) is a professional footballer who plays as a midfielder for San Lorenzo of Campeonato Femenino. Born in the United States, she plays for the Argentina national team.

== College career ==
Pavón began her career at Texas Southern University in 2019 then transferred to Lamar University in 2022, where she won the Southland Conference women's soccer tournament.

== Club career ==
Pavón's move to Argentine football came in 2024, when the newly promoted San Luis FC offered her the opportunity to join the squad and become a professional footballer in the country.

In early 2025, Belgrano announced her arrival via social media ahead of the new season.

== International career ==
Despite being born and raised in the United States, to an Argentine father from Córdoba and a Honduran mother, the minutes Pavón played for Belgrano earned herself her first call-up to the Argentina national team. In that friendly double-header, the team faced Canada, allowing Pavón to make her debut for the Albiceleste.

== Honours ==
=== Club ===
Belgrano

- Campeonato de Fútbol Femenino: Clausura 2025
