= Newell's Old Boys (women) =

- Full name: Club Atlético Newell's Old Boys
- Nickname(s): Las Leprosas (lit. 'The Lepers')
- Founded: 2018; 7 years ago
- Ground: Centro Jorge Griffa, Rosario, Santa Fe
- Chairman: Ignacio Astore
- Manager: Leandro Iglesias
- League: Campeonato de Fútbol Femenino
- Ap. 2025: 1st
- Website: https://newellsoldboys.com.ar/
Home colours	Away colours	Third colours

Club Atlético Newell's Old Boys is the women's football section of the sports club of the same name based in Rosario, Santa Fe, Argentina. They currently play in the Campeonato de Fútbol Femenino, the first division of women's football in Argentina.

== History ==
=== Beginnings and first successes ===
In 2018, women's football activities began at Newell's Old Boys, playing in the Rosarina League of the Rosarina Football Association. The first team was coached by Virginia Salera and Mariano Faurlin and was quickly formed to compete in the tournament that began in April. Two player trials were held in Bella Vista, with 150 players participating, of which 33 were selected. In their first appearance in the 2018 Rosarina League, they finished in third place.

In December 2019, Newell's won their first championship in their history, after beating Pablo VI 1-0 on the final matchday. In that championship they obtained 28 victories in 30 matches, scored 138 goals and received 14, their top scorer was María Eugenia Ramírez with 34 goals. In addition to winning the classic against their eternal rival Rosario Central by a 3-0 win, and by 2-1 against Social Lux (one of the best teams in the tournament).

=== Entry into the AFA ===
On 8 December 2020, it was confirmed that Newell's would play in official AFA tournaments, in the Primera División C (the third tier of Argentine women's football).

Their debut came in the 2021 season, on Saturday, 4 September, against Claypole away, losing 1-0. Their performance was good, finishing second in Zone A with 23 points and reaching the playoffs of the championship phase, where they defeated Sportivo Italiano 3-0 in the quarterfinals, but fell 3-2 to Belgrano in the semis. Reaching the final granted promotion since the final was to determine the champion, so the Leprosas were one game away from the Primera División B.

==== Promotion to División B ====
In 2023, due to Villa San Carlos' withdrawal from the Primera B, the AFA decided to award its place to Newell's, who had finished in 3rd place in the 2022 season and were therefore the highest ranked team behind the promoted San Luis FC and Talleres. Las Leprosas thus reached the second division of Argentina.

==== Promotion to División A ====
In the 2023 season championship, Newell's managed to qualify for the promotion phase and compete in the reduced tournament for the second promotion, where they played the final for the second promotion against Talleres de Córdoba in La Boutique, where with two goals from Feline Tokman and Damaris Sequeira they managed to win the match by 0-2, thus achieving their promotion to the Primera División A.

== Honours ==
=== Senior titles ===
- Campeonato de Fútbol Femenino (1): Apertura 2025
- Copa Federal (1): 2024
- Primera División B (1): 2023
- Primera División C (1): 2022

=== Regional ===
- Liga Rosarina (1): 2019
