= Catalina Primo =

Argentine footballer

Personal information
- Full name: Catalina Julia Primo
- Date of birth: 19 May 2000 (age 26)
- Place of birth: Río Tercero, Córdoba, Argentina
- Height: 1.65 m (5 ft 5 in)
- Position: Midfielder

Team information
- Current team: UAI Urquiza

Senior career*
Years	Team	Apps	(Gls)
2016–2018	Racing de Córdoba		
2018–2020	Talleres de Córdoba		
2020–	UAI Urquiza		

International career
2017–2020	Argentina U20		
- * Club domestic league appearances and goals

Catalina Julia Primo (born 19 May 2000) is an Argentine footballer who plays as a midfielder for football team UAI Urquiza. She also played for the Argentine U20 team.

== Club career ==
Primo began her steps in football at the age of 5 at the Sportivo 9 de Julio club in her hometown of Río Tercero. She first played for a women's football club at age 12 at Libertad de Hernando. She later moved to the city of Córdoba and had a brief stint at Instituto in 2015.

After playing in the Liga Cordobesa de Fútbol with Racing (2016–2018) and Talleres (2018–2020), Primo signed her first professional contract in 2020 with UAI Urquiza of the Primera División A.

== International career ==
Primo's first national call-up occurred in 2017, having been called-up the Argentine U20 team. She played in the South American U-20 Women's Championship in 2018 and 2020, but in both tournaments, the team did not manage to get past the group stage.
