= Rocío Bueno =

Argentine footballer

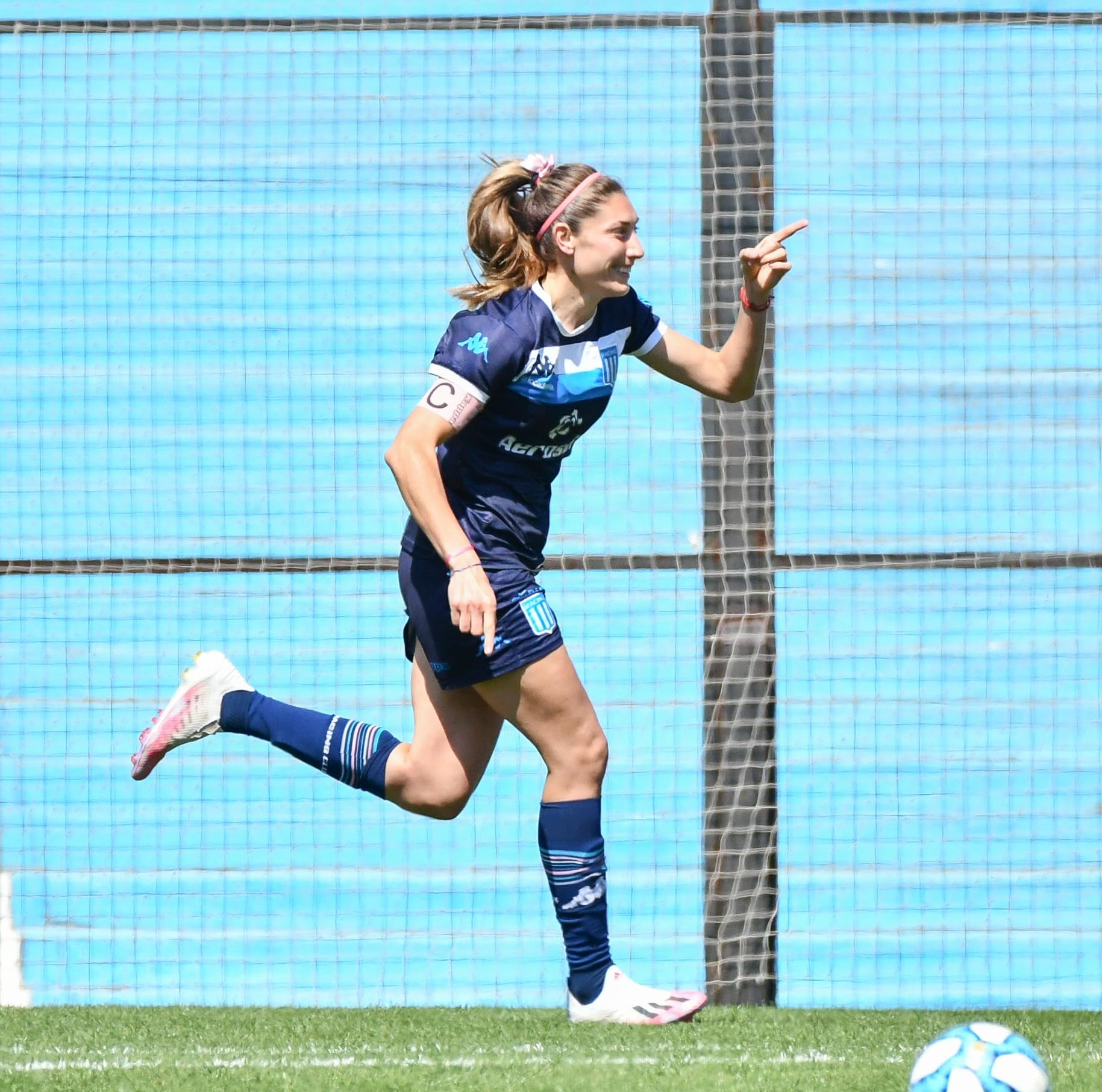
- Rocío Bueno in 2021 with Racing Club

Personal information
- Full name: Rocío Alejandra Bueno
- Date of birth: 16 October 1992 (age 34)
- Place of birth: Mechita, Buenos Aires, Argentina
- Height: 1.69 m (5 ft 7 in)
- Position: Striker

Team information
- Current team: Racing Club
- Number: 9

Senior career*
Years	Team	Apps	(Gls)
2014–2017	Boca Juniors		
2017–2020	UAI Urquiza		
2020–	Racing Club	45	(36)
2022	→ Sassuolo (loan)	2	(0)

International career
- Argentina
- * Club domestic league appearances and goals

Rocío Alejandra Bueno (born 16 October 1992) is an Argentine footballer who plays as a striker for Racing. Besides Argentina, she has played in Italy. She started playing football at the men's club of Mechita when she was six years old. She joined Boca Juniors in 2014. While playing for Boca in the 2015 Tournament against Platense, she scored five goals in 15 minutes. Bueno stayed with Boca until 2017, winning the Women's Super Cup in 2015.

She joined Racing in 2020. During her time at Academy she scored 31 goals over the course of 35 matches. She is a member of the Argentina women's national football team.

In 2022, Bueno was loaned for a year to Sassuolo of the Italian Serie A. She was the first woman Argentine footballer to be transferred to a foreign club.

== Personal life ==
Rocío Bueno enjoys singing and playing the guitar.

== Honours ==
Boca Juniors

- Supercopa Argentina de Fútbol Femenino: 2015

UAI Urquiza

- Primera División A: 2017–2018, 2018–2019
