= Oxandabarat =

Oxandabarat or Oxandabaratz is a Basque surname. Notable people with the surname include:

- Sofía Oxandabarat (born 1994), Uruguayan footballer
- Julián Alejandro Legaspi Oxandabarat (born 1973), Uruguayan-Peruvian actor
