= Talleres de Córdoba (women) =

Sports club in Argentina

Talleres
- Full name: Club Atlético Talleres
- Nickname: Matadoras (Killers)
- Founded: 2012; 14 years ago
- Ground: Estadio La Boutique, Córdoba, Argentina
- Capacity: 13,000
- Owner: 74,262 partners
- Chairman: Andrés Fassi
- Manager: Miqueas Russo
- Website: www.clubtalleres.com.ar/futbol-femenino/
Home colours	Away colours

Club Atlético Talleres (Spanish pronunciation: [ˈkluβ aˈtletiko taˈʎeɾes]; mostly known simply as Talleres [taˈʎeɾes] or Talleres de Córdoba [taˈʎeɾes ðe ˈkoɾðoβa]) is an Argentine football club from the city of Córdoba. They are the women's football section of the sports club of the same name. They play in the Argentine Primera División.

It was founded in 1913 and has played the Primera Femenina de la Liga Cordobesa de Fútbol (the first division of regional football in Córdoba) since 2012. Although women's football became professional in Argentina in 2019, this only reached teams located near Buenos Aires.

Even so, it has been one of the biggest exponents of women's football at a regional and national level even at that time, yielding players to the Argentine national team on numerous occasions and also selling players to professional teams.

In 2022, Talleres entered the national tournaments, being one of the first non-porteño teams to play at that level. Starting in the Primera C, in the lapse of three years, they got their promotion all the way up to Primera División A, the highest tier of Argentine women's football.

== History ==
In 2012, the first Torneo Amateur Femenino organized by the Liga Cordobesa de Fútbol was held. All teams affiliated with this regional league were required to submit a women's team for this season. The regulations indicated that two 30-minute halves would be played, up to seven changes could be made and that if there was a difference of seven goals, the match would be finalized. In addition, the women's teams depended on the performance of the men's equivalents to access the final instances of the local competition. Talleres created their team that year, under the direction of Manuel Ruiz and ex-Talleres world champion Luis Galván. In their first tournament, Las Matadoras, recently formed, achieved the runner-up position in the 2012 Liga Cordobesa.

During this time, Valentina Mansilla, Shirley Sosa, Milagros Cisneros and Sofía Muñoz were called up several times to represent the Argentina under-17 and under-20 national team. Other later call-ups include Milagros Mina (under-20), Catalina Primo (under-19 and under-20), Jazmín Allende, Magalí Chavero and Paulina Gramaglia (under-17).

Florencia Pianello was top scorer in 2017 and 2018. She became the all-time top scorer in Talleres with 135 goals in three years and later the all-time top scorer in the history of the institution, above male players such as Miguel Antonio Romero and Humberto Bravo. The international Argentine player would later sign Platense, a team in Primera División, but come back at the end of 2021 to play with "las Matadoras" again. In 2022, Talleres was confirmed to play in Primera C national league.

In their first national participation, they got promoted to Primera B. After two seasons, they were finally promoted to Primera División. They achieved the second division title in 2024 by not losing any match of the 22 they played, with 21 victories and 1 draw. Eliana Capdevila became the top scorer in national tournaments and Talleres continued receiving call-ups for national teams, such as Sofía Oxandabarat and Ahelín Piña to Uruguay and Brisa Jara and Priscila Ellena to under-17 and under-20 teams of Argentina.

Talleres will play in the highest level of national competition in Argentina in 2025.

== Players ==
=== Historic players ===
- Yamila Cazón – Captain between 2017 and 2022.
- Florencia Pianello – All-time top scorer (172 goals) and player of Argentina's national team.
- Paulina Gramaglia – Among the top scorers and player of Argentina's national team.

=== Players records ===
- Most goals in a season – Florencia Pianello and Eliana Capdevila (27 goals) in 2022 and 2024, respectively.
- Youngest player to debut in all-time – Paulina Gramaglia (13 years).
- Youngest player to debut in national tournaments – Lola Hernández (14 years and 5 days).

== Records ==
=== All-time records ===
- Victory:
  - Primera A – 4–0 v Newell's Old Boys and Huracán in 2026.
  - Primera B – 13–0 v Deportivo Español in 2024.
  - Primera C – 8–0 v Nueva Chicago in 2022.
- Defeat:
  - Primera A – 1–5 v Newell's Old Boys in 2025.
  - Primera B – 0–3 v Newell's Old Boys in 2023.
  - Primera C – 0–1 v Midland and San Luis in 2022.

=== Other records ===
- It is the only club to achieve an undefeated Primera B championship (22 matches, 21 wins and one draw).
- It is the third club in the country with the longest consecutive winning streak since the professionalization of Argentine football (21 matches in 2024), behind San Luis and Belgrano.
- It is the third club with the largest number of spectators at a match in Argentine football, with more than 10 thousand people at Estadio La Boutique when playing against Defensores de Belgrano for the 2024 Primera B.
- It is one of the Argentine clubs that yielded more players for the national team in all its levels.
- It is the fourth non-porteño team to be promoted to Primera División A, and the only one to do so with no lost matches.
- It is one of the first clubs from Córdoba to compete in national tournaments, together with Bella Vista and Belgrano.
- It is the third club in the country with the most followers on social networks.
- It is the only club, as well as Boca Juniors, to score five goals in a match against River Plate, an achievement that also meant the end of an over-four-year undefeated streak for las Millonarias.

== Honours ==
=== National ===
- Primera División B (1): 2024

=== Regional ===
- Liga Cordobesa de Fútbol (1): 2024
