= Shirley Sosa =

Argentine footballer and referee

Personal information
- Full name: Shirley Sosa
- Date of birth: January 8, 2001 (age 25)
- Place of birth: Argentina

Team information
- Current team: Talleres (Córdoba)

Youth career
- 2011–2015: Talleres

Senior career*
Years	Team	Apps	(Gls)
2015–2019	Talleres		
2019–202?	Camioneros		
2024–	Talleres (Córdoba)		

International career
- Argentina U-17
- * Club domestic league appearances and goals

Shirley Belén Sosa (born 8 January 2001) is an Argentine footballer and referee. She has played for Talleres de Córdoba and Camioneros, and has represented Argentina at the under-17 level.

== Career ==
Sosa joined the women's team of Talleres de Córdoba in 2015, having already trained at one of the club’s youth academies since 2011. She made her senior debut at the age of 14, and her strong performances earned her a call-up to the Argentina U-17 national team, where she played alongside older teammates.

She was a key part of the Talleres de Córdoba squad that competed in the Liga Cordobesa de Fútbol, helping the team win the Torneo Liguilla and achieve runner-up position in the Final Anual of 2015.

In 2019, Sosa joined Camioneros. After a few seasons with the club, she retired from playing and became a referee, officiating matches in the Liga Cordobesa de Fútbol.

In 2024, she returned to competitive football and rejoined Talleres de Córdoba.
