= Abigaíl Chaves =

Argentine footballer (born 1997)

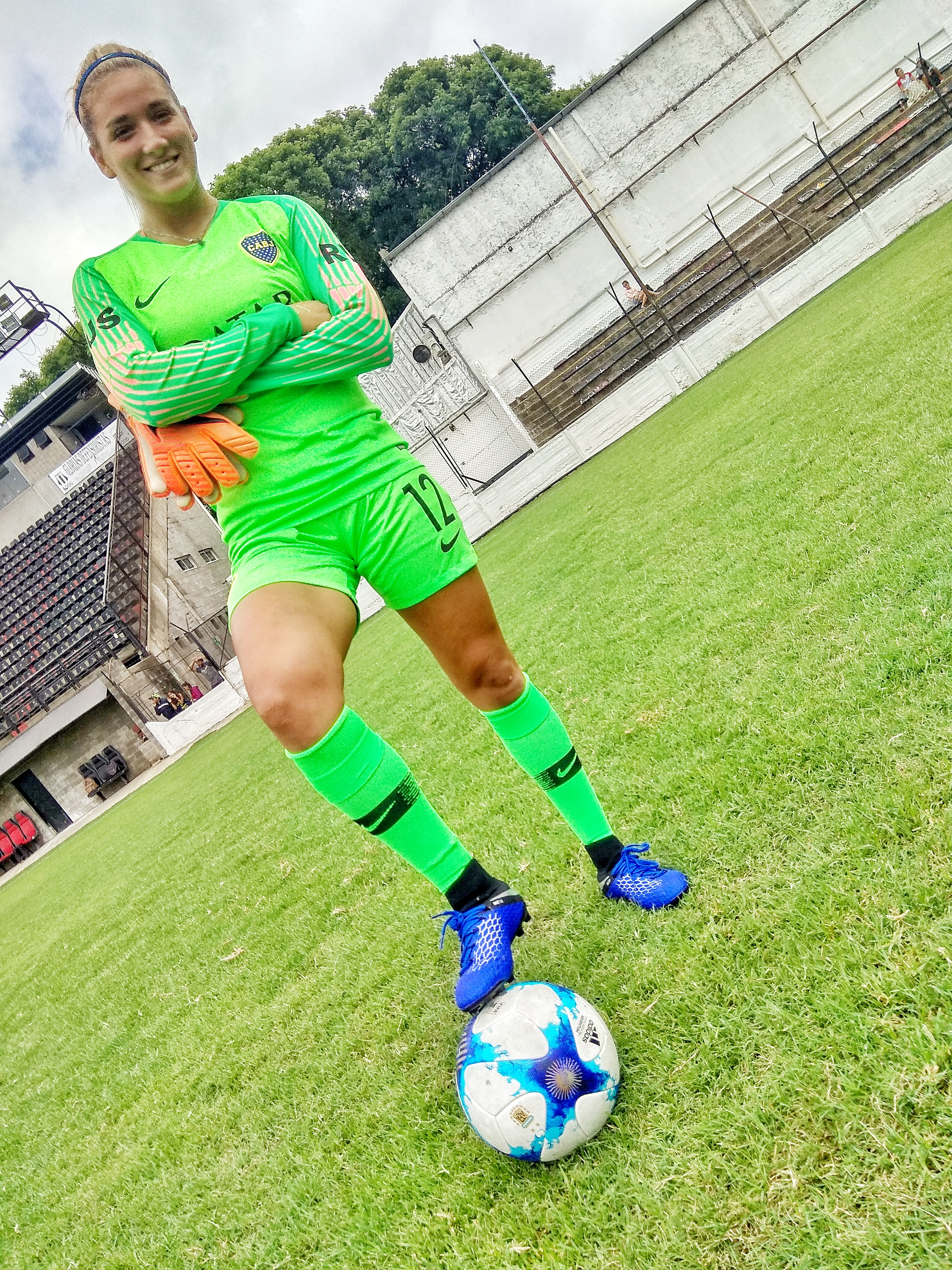
- Chaves with Boca Juniors in 2019

Personal information
- Full name: Abigaíl Paola Chaves
- Date of birth: 11 July 1997 (age 29)
- Place of birth: San Isidro, Buenos Aires, Argentina
- Height: 1.75 m (5 ft 9 in)
- Position: Goalkeeper

Youth career
- Pinocho
- Boca Juniors

Senior career*
Years	Team	Apps	(Gls)
2017–2020	Boca Juniors		
2020–2021	San Lorenzo		
2021–2024	Huracán		
2024	→ Universidad de Chile (loan)		
2025	Universidad de Chile		
2025–2026	Fenerbahçe	2	(0)
2026	1. FC Nürnberg	0	(0)

International career^{‡}
2023–	Argentina	2	(0)
Medal record
Women's football
Representing Argentina
Copa América Femenina
Bronze medal – third place	2025 Ecuador
- * Club domestic league appearances and goals as of 15 February 2026 (UTC) ‡ National team caps and goals as of 15 February 2026

Abigaíl Paola Chaves (born 11 July 1997) is an Argentine footballer who plays as a goalkeeper and the Argentina women's national team. Before playing football, Chaves played volleyball for club Pinocho.

== Club Career ==
Chaves has played for Boca Juniors, San Lorenzo and Huracán in her homeland.

In 2024, she moved to Chile and joined Universidad de Chile on loan from Huracán. In 2025, she continued with them and left them in September to move to Turkey.

== International career ==
At international level, she was a member of the Argentina squad in the 2023 FIFA World Cup.

== Career statistics ==
=== International ===
As of match played 18 April 2026

Appearances and goals by national team and year
National team	Year	Apps	Goals
Argentina	2025	2	0
Total		2	0
