= Damián Ledesma =

Argentine footballer

Personal information
- Full name: Damián David Ledesma
- Date of birth: 21 May 1982 (age 44)
- Place of birth: Rosario, Argentina
- Height: 1.81 m (5 ft 11 in)
- Positions: Centre back; defensive midfielder

Youth career
- –2004: Rosario Central

Senior career*
Years	Team	Apps	(Gls)
2004–2008	Rosario Central	101	(5)
2008–2009	Independiente	38	(1)
2009–2010	Racing Club	12	(1)
2011	Deportivo Cuenca	18	(0)
2011	LDU Loja	0	(0)
2012	Rangers	34	(1)
2013–2015	San Martín SJ	42	(5)
2016–2017	Aldosivi	11	(0)
2017–2018	Central Córdoba	47	(3)
2019–2020	Dock Sud	37	(0)
2020–2021	Central Córdoba	5	(0)
Total		345	(16)

Managerial career
- 2021–2022: Rosario Central (youth)
- 2022: Unión Totoras (assistant)
- 2022–2024: Rosario Central (women)
- 2025: Coronel Aguirre
- 2026–: Deportes Santa Cruz (assistant)
- * Club domestic league appearances and goals

Damián David Ledesma (born 21 May 1982 in Rosario) is an Argentine former footballer who played as a centre back and defensive midfielder.

== Playing career ==
Ledesma started his career with Rosario Central and scored a goal on his debut on 13 November 2004 in a 3–1 victory against Banfield. He remained with Rosario Central for four seasons and made 101 league appearances and scored five goals. In 2008, Ledesma joined Independiente and went onto make 38 appearances in the league before departing, in 2009, to join Independiente's rivals, Racing Club de Avellaneda. After spending one season with Racing, he left to join Ecuadorian Serie A side Deportivo Cuenca in 2011. 18 appearances followed before he left to join fellow Ecuadorian club Liga de Loja in 2012. His time with Liga de Loja lasted only a few months as he soon left to join Chile's Rangers de Talca.

After one season and one goal in 35 appearances with Rangers, Ledesma returned to Argentina in 2013 as he signed for San Martín. He made his debut on 10 February against San Lorenzo. Six games later he scored his first goal for the club, the second goal in a 2–3 defeat versus Godoy Cruz. He made 17 appearances in total in his first season with San Martín but it ended in disappointment as the club were relegated to the Primera B Nacional. Two goals in 25 appearances followed in the next three seasons (including 2014 when San Martín won promotion, but he played just once) for Ledesma before he left to sign for Argentine Primera División side Aldosivi.

Ledesma ended his career with Dock Sud and Central Córdoba de Rosario in 2020–21.

== Coaching career ==
Ledesma started coaching at the Rosario Central youth ranks in 2021. After a stint serving as assistant coach of his brother for Unión F.C. Totoras, he assumed as manager of the Rosario Central women's team in 2023. On 1 July 2025, he and Germán Rivarola assumed as managers of Club Atlético Coronel Aguirre.

In May 2026, Ledesma joined the technical staff of Dalcio Giovagnoli for Chilean club Deportes Santa Cruz.

== Career statistics ==
=== Club ===
As of 4 November 2016.

Club statistics
Club	Season	League			Cup (Note: Includes the Copa Argentina.)		League Cup		Continental (Note: Includes the Copa Libertadores and Copa Sudamericana.)		Other		Total	
Club	Season	Division	Apps	Goals	Apps	Goals	Apps	Goals	Apps	Goals	Apps	Goals	Apps	Goals
Aldosivi	2016	Argentine Primera División	7	0	0	0	—		—		0	0	7	0
Aldosivi	2016–17	Argentine Primera División	0	0	0	0	—		—		0	0	0	0
Aldosivi	Total		7	0	0	0	—		—		0	0	7	0
Career total			7	0	0	0	—		—		0	0	7	0
