= Paulina Gramaglia =

Argentine footballer

Personal information
- Full name: Paulina Gramaglia
- Date of birth: 21 March 2003 (age 23)
- Place of birth: Córdoba, Córdoba, Argentina
- Height: 1.75 m (5 ft 9 in)
- Position: Forward

Team information
- Current team: CD Tenerife
- Number: 24

Senior career*
Years	Team	Apps	(Gls)
2016–2020	Talleres		(61)
2020–2022	UAI Urquiza	7+	(9+)
2022	→ Houston Dash (loan)	1	(0)
2023–2025	Houston Dash	0	(0)
2023–2025	→ Red Bull Bragantino (loan)	32	(19)
2025-	CD Tenerife	9	(1)

International career^{‡}
- Argentina U17
2022	Argentina U20	4	(1)
2021-	Argentina	27	(2)
Medal record
Women's football
Representing Argentina
Copa América Femenina
Bronze medal – third place	2025 Ecuador
- * Club domestic league appearances and goals as of 2 December 2025 ‡ National team caps and goals as of 18 April 2026.

Paulina Gramaglia (born 21 March 2003), also known as Pauli, is an Argentine professional footballer who plays as a forward for the Spanish Primera División club CD Tenerife. She also plays for the Argentina women's national team.

== Club career ==
Gramaglia has played for Talleres de Córdoba and UAI Urquiza in Argentina. She joined and started playing for the latter in early December 2020. On 20 December 2021, she was announced as a new player of Houston Dash in the United States for the 2022 season, loaned by UAI Urquiza. She debuted for the Dash on 16 July 2022, the youngest player to debut in club history.

On 18 November 2022, the Dash announced that the club had exercised its option to purchase Gramaglia's contract, making her the first woman whose contract was sold from an Argentinian football club to a foreign club. The Dash re-signed Gramaglia to a one-year contract with an option for an additional year, and then on 10 February 2023 loaned her out to Brazilian club Red Bull Bragantino through 31 December 2023.

== International career ==
Gramaglia has captained Argentina at under-17 level. She made her senior debut on 27 November 2021.

== Career statistics ==
=== International ===
As of match played 14 April 2026

Appearances and goals by national team and year
National team	Year	Apps	Goals
Argentina	2021	1	0
Argentina	2022	1	0
Argentina	2023	14	0
Argentina	2025	9	2
Argentina	2026	2	0
Total		27	2

List of international goals scored by Paulina Gramaglia
No.	Date	Venue	Opponent	Score	Result	Competition
1.	2 December 2025	Estadio Florencio Sola, Banfield, Argentina	Bolivia	1–0	8–0	2025–26 CONMEBOL Women's Nations League
2.	2 December 2025	Estadio Florencio Sola, Banfield, Argentina	Bolivia	4–0	8–0	2025–26 CONMEBOL Women's Nations League
