= Rosana Gómez =

Argentine football player and manager and futsal player

Personal information
- Full name: Rosana Itatí Gómez
- Date of birth: 13 July 1980 (age 46)
- Place of birth: Granadero Baigorria, Argentina
- Position: Midfielder

Team information
- Current team: Bolivia Women (manager)

Senior career*
Years	Team	Apps	(Gls)
1995–1997	Rosario Central		
1998–2012	Boca Juniors		
2013	River Plate Futsal		

International career^{‡}
	Argentina	16	(0)

Managerial career
- 2010–2014: UBA Women
- 2014–2015: Rosario Central Women
- 2016: Social Lux Women
- 2017: Argentina Women (university team)
- 2017–2019: Rosario Central Women
- 2022–2023: Bolivia Women
- * Club domestic league appearances and goals ‡ National team caps and goals as of 10 September 2007 (before the 2007 FIFA Women's World Cup)

Rosana Itatí Gómez (born 13 July 1980) is an Argentine football manager and former player and former futsal player. She manages the Bolivia women's national team. She played as a midfielder for the Argentina women's national team.

== Club career ==
Gómez played for Rosario Central and Boca Juniors in Argentina.

== International career ==
Gómez capped for Argentina at senior level during two Copa America Femenina editions (2003 and 2006) and two editions of the FIFA Women's World Cup (2003 and 2007).

== Managerial career ==
Gómez managed the women's teams of UBA, Rosario Central and Social Lux in Argentina and the Argentina women (university team) at the 2017 Summer Universiade.
