= 1991 Campeonato de Fútbol Femenino =

1st season of women's football league in Argentina

Campeonato de Fútbol Femenino
- Season: 1991
- Dates: 27 October – 15 December 1991
- Champions: River Plate (1st title)
- Matches: 28
- Goals: 127 (4.54 per match)
- Biggest home win: River Plate 13–0 Sacachispas (4 December 1991)
- Biggest away win: Deportivo Español 1–8 River Plate (27 October 1991)
- Highest scoring: River Plate 13–0 Sacachispas (4 December 1991)

The 1991 Campeonato de Fútbol Femenino was the 1st season in top-flight women's football in Argentina. The season began on October 27 and ended on December 15.

The competition was contested by eight clubs and the tournament took a league format with each team playing the others once. River Plate became the inaugural champions.

In previous years, unofficial tournaments unrelated to AFA had been held, organized mainly by a woman named Nils Altuna, and most of the players who competed in this tournament came from there. Yupanqui arrived as champions and were considered one of the most powerful teams of the moment.

== Teams and locations ==
Team	Location
Boca Juniors	Buenos Aires
Deportivo Español	Buenos Aires
Excursionistas	Buenos Aires
Independiente	Avellaneda
Deportivo Laferrere	Gregorio de Laferrere
River Plate	Buenos Aires
Sacachispas	Buenos Aires
Yupanqui	Buenos Aires

== League table and results ==
Pos	Team	Pld	W	D	L	GF	GA	GD	Pts	RIV	BOC	EXC	IND	YUP	ESP	LAF	SAC
1	River Plate (C)	7	5	2	0	34	6	+28	12	—	—	0–0	—	—	—	1–0	13–0
2	Boca Juniors	7	4	1	2	21	10	+11	9	4–4	—	—	1–2	—	—	2–0	11–0
3	Excursionistas	7	3	3	1	15	5	+10	9	—	0–1	—	—	—	2–0	4–1	6–0
4	Independiente	7	4	1	2	21	15	+6	9	1–6	—	1–1	—	—	—	—	10–0
5	Yupanqui	7	3	3	1	13	9	+4	9	0–2	4–1	1–1	4–2	—	—	—	—
6	Deportivo Español	7	2	1	4	13	19	−6	5	1–8	0–1	—	2–3	2–2	—	—	—
7	Deportivo Laferrere	7	1	1	5	5	12	−7	3	—	—	—	0–1	1–1	0–1	—	—
8	Sacachispas	7	0	0	7	5	51	−46	0	—	—	—	—	0–1	3–7	2–3	—

Source: RSSSF
Rules for classification: 1) Points; 2) Head-to-head points; 3) Head-to-head goal difference; 4) Goal difference; 5) Goals scored.
(C) Champions
