= Ichika Egashira =

Japanese women's football (soccer) player

Ichika Egashira 江頭一花
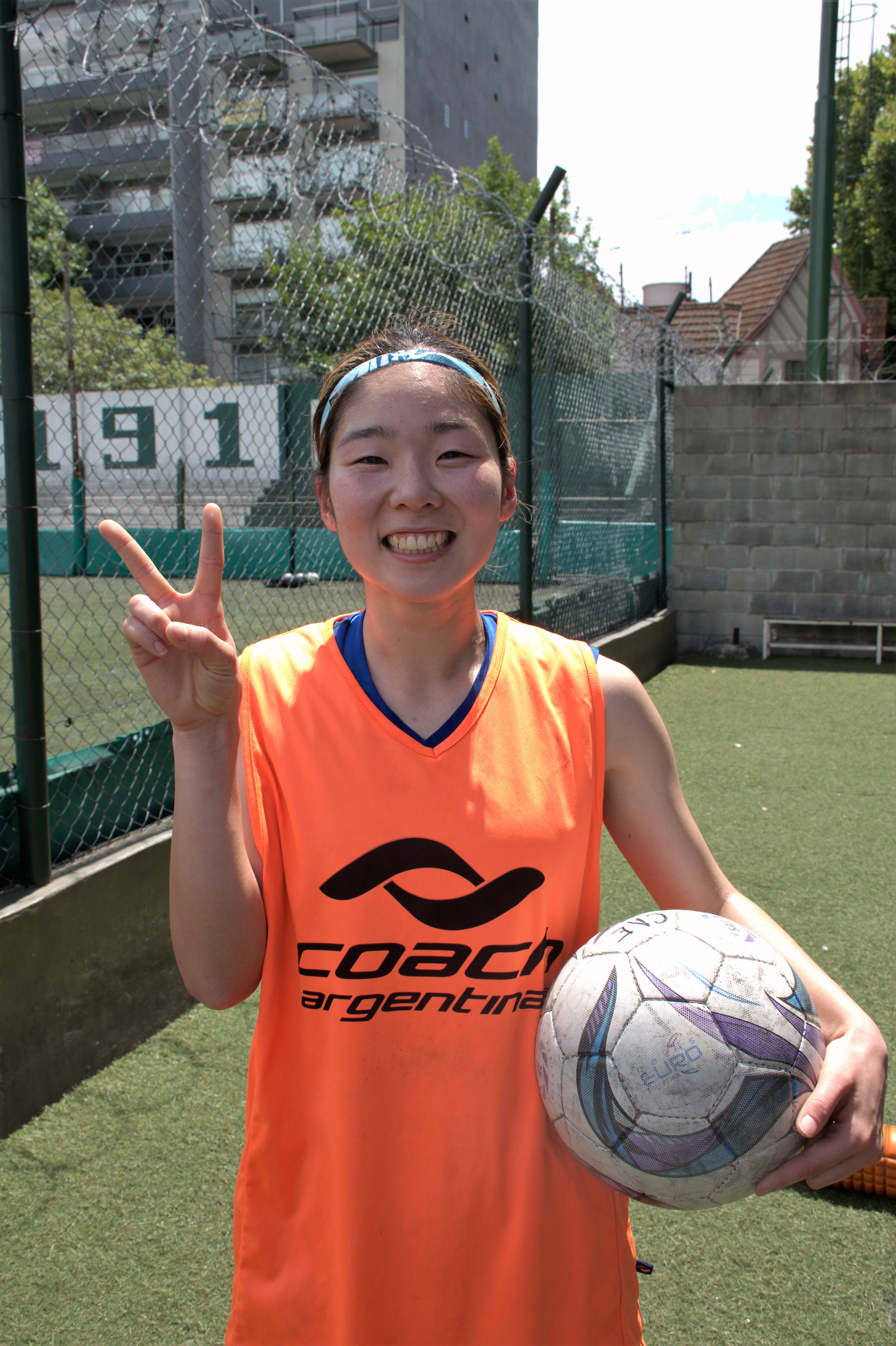

Personal information
- Full name: Ichika Egashira
- Date of birth: 18 June 2002 (age 24)
- Place of birth: Gotō, Nagasaki, Japan
- Height: 1.58 m (5 ft 2 in)
- Position: Forward

Team information
- Current team: San Lorenzo

Youth career
- 2020–2021: Iga FC Kunoichi Mie

Senior career*
Years	Team	Apps	(Gls)
2021–2022	Iga FC Kunoichi Mie		
2023	Excursionistas		
2024	River Plate	14	(9)
2025–	San Lorenzo		
- * Club domestic league appearances and goals

Ichika Egashira (Japanese: 江頭 一花; born 18 June 2002) is a Japanese footballer who plays as an attacker for San Lorenzo.

== Career ==
Before the 2023 season, Egashira signed for the Argentine side Excursionistas.

On 9 January 2024, it was announced that Egashira had signed for River Plate. She left the club at the end of the year after playing 14 matches and scoring 9 goals.

In January 2025, San Lorenzo de Almagro announced the signing of Egashira.

== Honours ==
Iga FC Kunoichi Mie

- Nadeshiko League : 2021
