= San Luis FC (Argentina) =

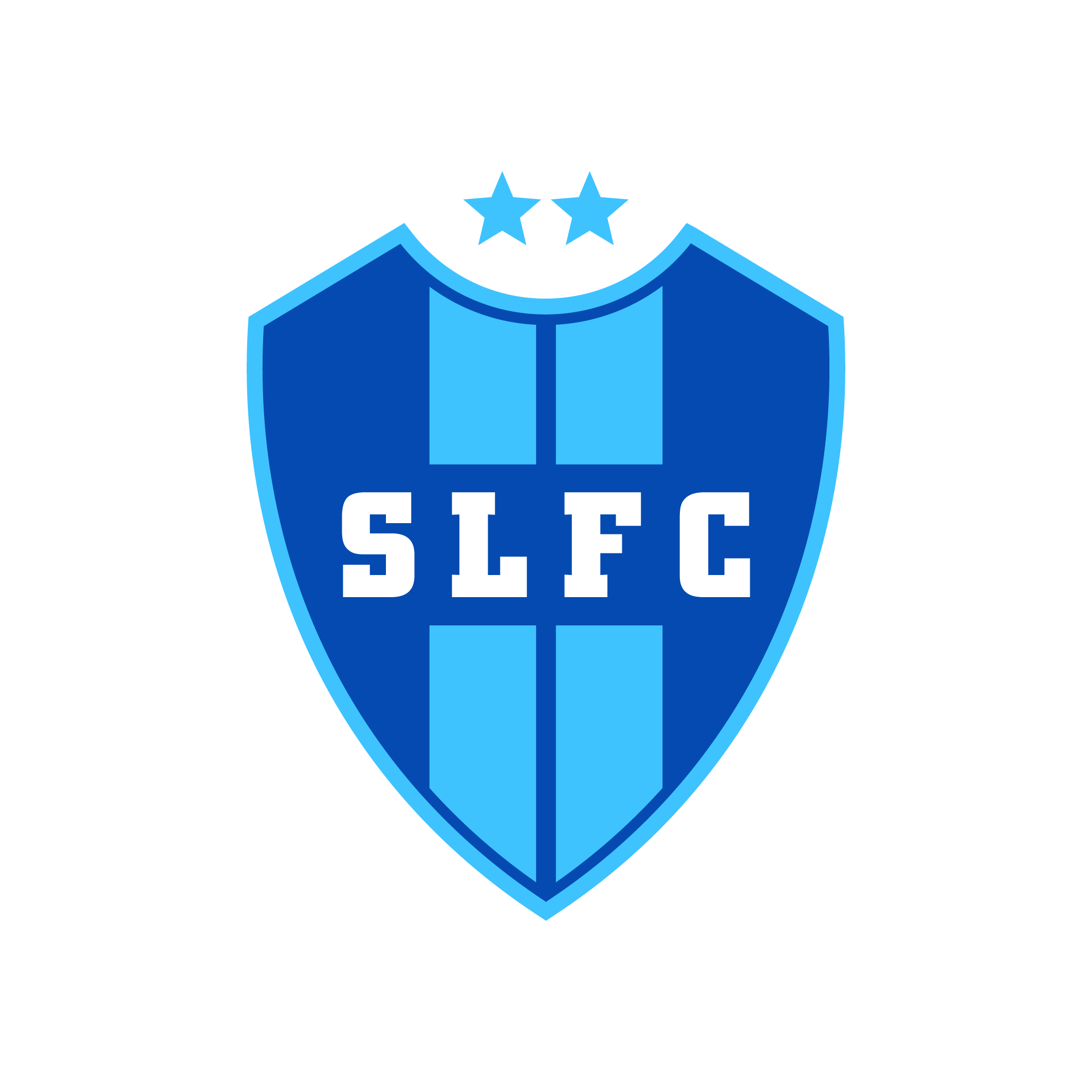
- Full name: San Luis Fútbol Club
- Nickname(s): Las Puntanas
- Founded: 2022; 3 years ago
- Ground: Estadio Provincial Juan Gilberto Funes, La Punta, Argentina
- Owner: Government of San Luis Province
- Chairman: Normalizing Committee
- Manager: Carlos Casteglione
- League: Primera División A
- 2024: In progress
- Website: https://sanluisfc.com.ar/
| Home colours | Away colours | Third colours |

San Luis Fútbol Club, also known as San Luis FC, is an Argentine women's football club founded in 2022 in the San Luis Province. It currently competes in the Primera División A. Juan Gilberto Funes is the club's home ground and it is based in the city of La Punta.

== History ==
=== Origins ===
Since 2020, the Argentine Sports Confederation has discussed the possibility of a women's football team in the province, since 2018 a women's football development plan had been carried out in which a San Luis Team participated and in 2022 the club was officially founded at the initiative of the government of San Luis. It is the first San Luis women's football team to officially compete in an AFA category. In April 2022 the team and coaching staff were presented at the "Ave Fénix" Center of Sports Development .

==== Debut and promotion to Second Division ====
The team's debut season was in Primera C 2022 in Zone A, their first match was against Berazategui, culminating in a 6–1 win in their favor at home. Mariana Alarcón was the author of the first official goal in the club's history.

They achieved promotion to the second category of Argentina on 3 December 2022, after the victory against Nueva Chicago. And on December 10, the Puntanas managed to become undefeated champions by defeating Talleres. Florencia Cordero was the team's top scorer with 22 goals.

=== Promotion to Primera División A ===
The official debut in the second division began on 19 March 2023 against Argentino de Quilmes where San Luis FC achieved the first victory in the category after winning 4–1. Promotion to the first division was achieved on November 5 after the 1–0 victory against Sarmiento with a goal from Nikol Laurnaga.

=== Intervention and disaffiliation ===
On 13 December 2023, an audit discovered a movement of 300 million pesos made by the Secretary of Sports of San Luis (and then president of the club), Cintia Ramírez, to the club, 2 days before the end of her position. As a result of this, the provincial government led by Claudio Poggi carried out an intervention that was going to last 3 months in the club at the beginning of investigations and Ramírez was criminally denounced for misappropriation of public funds. This intervention was against the regulations and Statute of the AFA, which through the Consejo Federal requested the Liga Sanluiseña to disaffiliate the club while it was intervened.

As a result of this situation, the team could not compete in the Copa Federal, where they had to face Boca Juniors on 31 January 2024.

=== Normalizing Committee ===
On 7 February 2024, the Government of San Luis decided to lift the intervention carried out in the club after reaching an agreement with the AFA and the Consejo Federal. On the 9th, the Consejo Federal sent a statement to the Liga Sanluiseña about the lifting of the sanction against the League and about the Normalizing Committee that the it will form to be in charge of the leadership of the club until its eventual elections.

== Honours ==
- Primera División B (1): 2023
- Primera División C (1): 2022
