= Érica Lonigro =

Argentine footballer

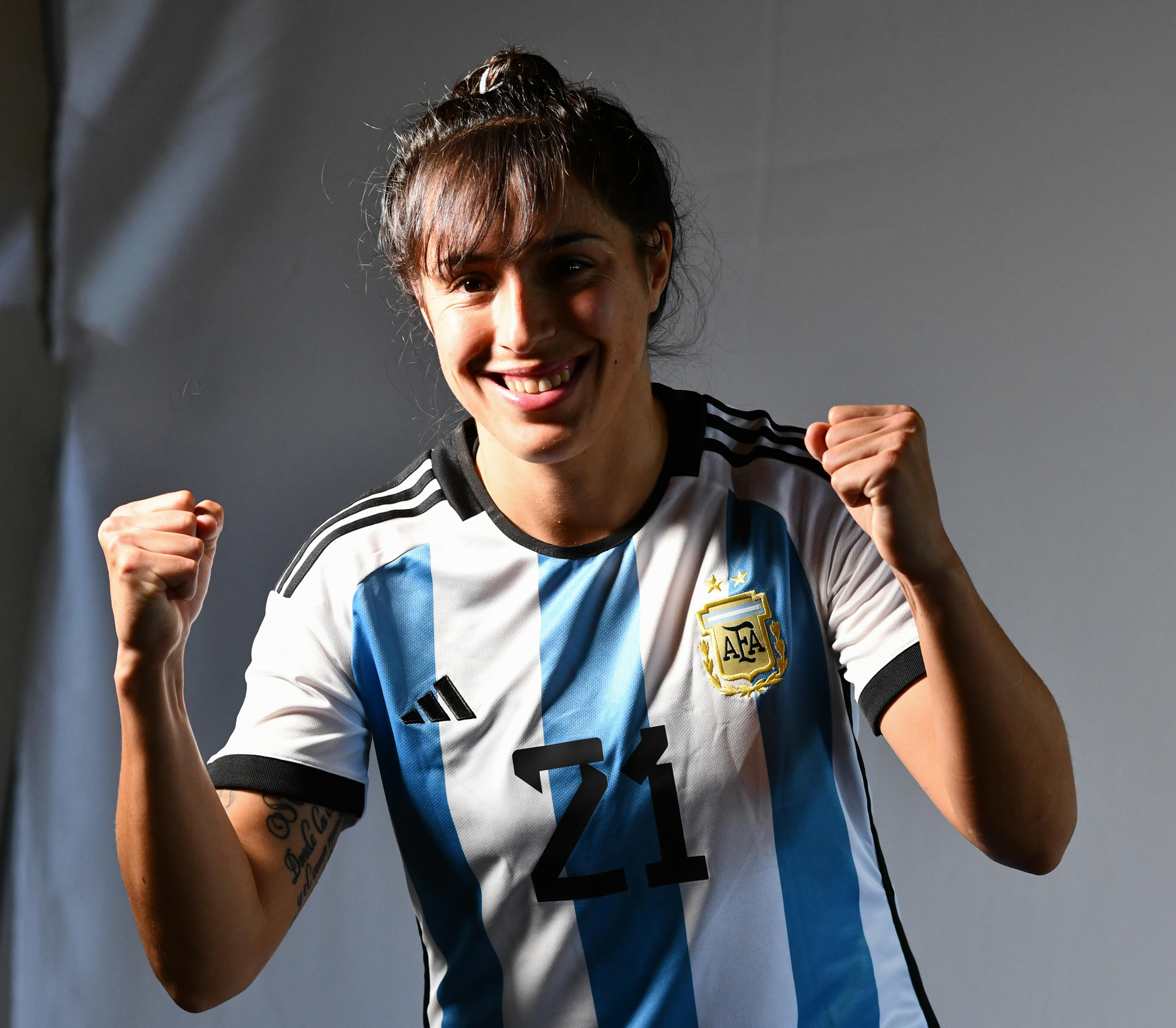

Personal information
- Full name: Érica Noelia Lonigro
- Date of birth: July 6, 1994 (age 32)
- Place of birth: Argentina
- Height: 1.66 m (5 ft 5 in)
- Position: Forward

Team information
- Current team: Rosario Central

Senior career*
Years	Team	Apps	(Gls)
2017–2023	Rosario Central		
2021	→ Libertad/Limpeño (loan)		
2022	→ River Plate (loan)		
2024–	Dux Logroño		

International career
2021–	Argentina	13	(2)
- * Club domestic league appearances and goals

Érica Noelia Lonigro (born 6 July 1994) is an Argentine footballer who plays as a striker for the Spanish club Dux Logroño.

== Early life ==
Lonigro was born in the Las Flores neighborhood and sold flowers as a child. Nicknamed "Jesi", she started playing football at a young age and played football with future FIFA World Cup winner Ángel Correa as a child. As a teenager, she was part of the Sur Productora youth program.

== Career ==
Before focusing on football, Lonigro worked in a cleaning company among other occupations. Besides Argentina, Lonigro has played in Paraguay. During the 2019/20 season, she made sixteen appearances and scored seventeen goals before the season was halted due to the Coronavirus pandemic.

== Career statistics ==
=== International goals ===
Scores and results list Argentina's goal tally first

As of match played 2 March 2024.

No.	Date	Venue	Opponent	Score	Result	Competition
1.	12 July 2022	Estadio Centenario, Armenia, Colombia	Peru	4–0	4–0	2022 Copa América
2.	9 October 2022	Estadio Municipal de Chapín, Jerez, Spain	Poland	2–0	2–2	Friendly
