= Sofía Oxandabarat =

Uruguayan footballer

María Sofía Oxandabarat Dornelles (born 15 June 1994) is a Uruguayan footballer who plays as a striker for Talleres.

== Early life ==
Oxandabarat was born in 1994 in Salto, Uruguay.

== College career ==
In 2022, Oxandabarat obtained a bachelor's degree in communications sciences.

== Club career ==
In 2021, Oxandabarat signed for Uruguayan side Defensor Sporting, helping the club win the league. In 2023, she signed for Argentine side Talleres.

== International career ==
Oxandabarat has played for the Uruguay women's national football team.

== Personal life ==
Oxandabarat has been a supporter of Italian Serie A side Roma.
