= Social Atlético Televisión =

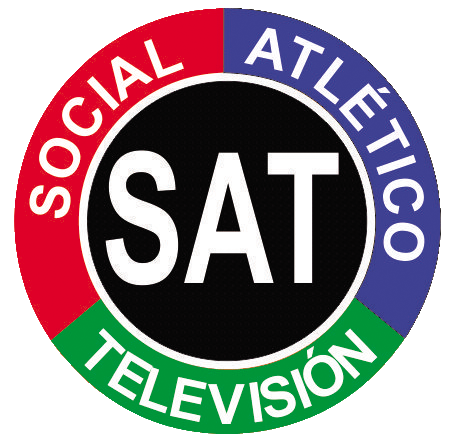
- Full name: Social Atlético Televisión
- Founded: 14 November 2017; 8 years ago
- Ground: Camping Moreno Satsaid, Moreno, Buenos Aires Province, Argentina
- Capacity: 1,000
- Chairman: Carlos Horacio Arreceygor
- League: Campeonato Femenino
- Website: https://clubsat.com.ar/home/
Home colours	Away colours

Social Atlético Televisión, commonly known as SAT, is an Argentine sports club situated in Moreno, Buenos Aires Province. Its women's football team is currently playing their debut season in the Campeonato Femenino. Other sports hosted at the club are men's football, cycling, archery, Taekwondo, rugby union, and volleyball.

== History ==
The men's team was formed in 2017 and affiliated with the Liga Lujanense de Fútbol. That same year they became champion of the First Division and qualified for the Torneo Federal C.

=== In Federal C ===
On January 28, 2018, he made his debut in Federal C and in the AFA, winning 2-0 on his visit to Poland, with 2 goals from Frangipane. He would be able to complete Zone 11 of the Northern Pampas Region in second place.

In the Round of 16, they beat Hurlingham Cathedral 2-0 and, after losing 3-2, advanced. In the Quarterfinals, they tied 1 to 1 against Colón, but managed to win 2 to 1 in Chivilcoy. In the semifinals, after two 1-1 draws, they lost on penalties to Fernando Cáceres.

=== In the Regional Federal Amateur ===
In mid-2018, the AFA eliminated Federal B and Federal C, being replaced by the new Torneo Regional Federal Amateur, which began to occupy the fourth category and at the same time became the route for the introduction of clubs in the regional leagues.

In the inaugural edition of 2019, it competed in Zone 6 of the Northern Pampas Region. On January 27 he made his debut in the tournament, drawing 0-0 in Chivilcoy with Independiente. On March 23, on the penultimate date, they lost 1 to 0 against Monterrey, being condemned to fourth place in the zone, due to the away goals scored by Monterrey in SAT's 5 to 4 victory in the first round. He said goodbye to the tournament by beating Fernando Cáceres 3 to 2.

In the 2021/22 tournament, he competed in Zone 3 of the Northern Pampas Region, finishing just in second place. In the Round of 16, they defeated Compañía General on penalties, after drawing 0-0 in both games. In the Quarterfinals, they lost 1 to 0 against Mariano Moreno and after equalizing 1 to 1, they were eliminated.

In the 2022/23 tournament, he competed in Zone 10 of the Northern Pampas Region. They reached the last date equal in points with Las Mandarinas in the obligation to win, since they had lost at home against them by 1 to 0, but on their visit they tied 1 to 1 with Las Mandarinas and came second in the Zone; Even so, he managed to advance to the next stage among the best seconds. In the Round of 16, they lost to Huracán de Chivilcoy by 1 to 0 and 2 to 1, being eliminated.

=== Present ===
In November 2023, the AFA raised the possibility of creating a new tournament for clubs that were not affiliated. The club was included among the 14 invited to the new Amateur Promotional Tournament, a competition that takes the place of the eliminated Primera D. At the beginning of January 2024, the club's delegates participated in a meeting at the AFA headquarters.

On February 23, 2024, they made their debut in the tournament, hosting Everton and losing 2 to 1.

== Women's football ==
The women's team was formed in 2017 and competed in Primera B (the second tier of women's football in Argentina) until their promotion at the end of the 2018-19. SAT are playing their first season in the Campeonato Femenino in 2019-20. In September 2019, SAT – for the first time – signed players on professional contracts. The squad currently consists of 26 players, eight of whom are on professional contracts.
