= Club Atlético Banfield (women) =

Banfield
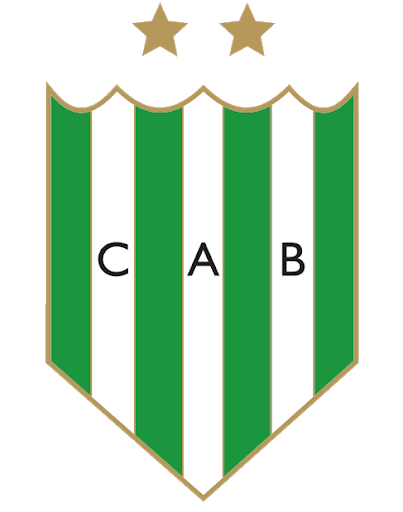
- Full name: Club Atlético Banfield
- Nickname(s): El Taladro (The Drill)
- Founded: 1997; 28 years ago
- Ground: Estadio Florencio Sola, Banfield, Buenos Aires
- Capacity: 34,901
- Chairman: Lucía Barbuto
- Manager: Indiana Fernandez
- League: Primera División A
- 2023: 11th
- Website: https://clubabanfield.org/category/futbol-femenino/
| Home colours | Away colours | Third colours |

Club Atlético Banfield Women is the women's association football section of the homonymous sports club, which is based in the city of Banfield in Greater Buenos Aires. They currently play in Primera División A.

== History ==
The first stage of the women's football section of the Drill dates from 1997 to 2005 where the institution did not continue with the discipline. On 31 May 2018, Banfield presented the required documents to the AFA to be able to join the women's football league in the corresponding category, starting its second stage. In the letter presented to the Argentine Football Association, it was expressly established that the representatives of this activity will be Laura Anabella Santana and Agustina Furno. Both members of the Women's Subcommittee who worked together with the club to build this team. In turn, with the creation of the first women's team of the institution, a youth category is added and meets the conditions of the Superliga (First Division of Argentina) and CONMEBOL to participate in their respective tournaments.

Since its creation in 2018, Banfield has played in Primera División B. In October 2018, with the inauguration of Lucía Barbuto, the club became the first one in the history of the first division to elect a female president.

On June 26 2023 Banfield played the first ever "Clásico del Sur femenino" against their rivals Lanús, the matched ended in a 3–0 victory for Banfield.
