= Campeonato de Fútbol Femenino =

Semi-professional women's football league in Argentina

Primera División A
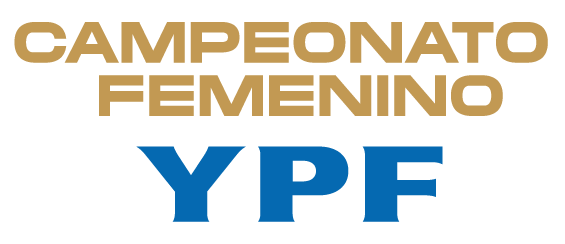
- Organising body: AFA
- Founded: 27 October 1991; 34 years ago
- First season: 1991
- Country: Argentina
- Confederation: CONMEBOL
- Number of clubs: 17
- Level on pyramid: 1
- Relegation to: Primera División B
- Domestic cup: Copa Federal
- International cup: Copa Libertadores Femenina
- Current champions: Belgrano (1st title) (2025 Clausura)
- Most championships: Boca Juniors (29 titles)
- Broadcaster(s): TV Pública; DeporTV
- Website: afa.com.ar/femenino
- Current: 2026 Argentine Women's Primera División A

The Primera División A (Spanish pronunciation: [pɾiˈmeɾa ðiβiˈsjon a]; English: "First Division A"), known officially as Campeonato Femenino YPF for sponsorship reasons, is a semi-professional women's football league in Argentina. The tournament is ruled by the Argentine Football Association (AFA), with its first season held in 1991.

Since 2016, the tournament has been the highest tier of the Argentine women's football league system following the creation of a second division called Primera División B. It applies a system of promotion and relegation with it, with the teams finishing at the bottom of the annual standings being relegated. Before then, the Primera División A was simply named "Campeonato de Fútbol Femenino", as it was the only women's football tournament in existence.

Teams contesting the championship are mainly from the region of Buenos Aires, which includes the Autonomous city, Greater Buenos Aires and La Plata. There are also teams from Córdoba, San Luis and Santa Fe. Apart from this competition, other regional female leagues exist around Argentina.

Boca Juniors is the most successful club with 29 titles won to date.

== History ==
The competition was first played in 1991, with 8 teams participating. The first champions were River Plate. Since 2009 the best team of the season wins the right to compete in the Copa Libertadores de Fútbol Femenino.

Since the 2011–12 season, the Association allowed non-affiliate clubs to play in the tournament as guest teams. Therefore Universidad de Buenos Aires (UBA) and Vélez Sársfield de Mercedes where the first clubs in that condition to take part.

In March 2019, it was announced that the league would become professional from the 2019/20 season. The agreement was signed by President of AFA, Claudio Tapia, and Sergio Marchi (representing the footballers union). The Association committed to give each club AR$ 125,000 for players' salaries. The AFA's facilities can be also used by clubs which don't have a venue to host their home games.

Changes in Argentine women's football also include the creation of a new competition (similar to men's Copa Argentina), named "Fútbol en Evolución", contested by teams all around the country.

== Format ==
For the 2019–20 season (Torneo Rexona), the tournament has three stages, Fase Clasificatoria, Fase Campeonato and Fase Permanencia.

The first stage, "Fase Clasificatoria", is contested by the 17 participating teams. Teams play in a single round-robin tournament. Clubs placed 1st to 8th at the end of the competition, qualify to the next stage ("Fase Campeonato") while the rest nine clubs play the "Fase Permanencia".

The "Fase Campeonato" is contested by the eight qualified teams from the previous stage, playing a double round-robin tournament. The club earning most points at the end of the competition is crowned champion, also qualifying to Copa Libertadores Femenina.

The "Fase Permanencia" is contested by the nine teams placed 9th to 17th in the qualification stage (Clasificatoria). After a double robin tournament, the three worst placed teams are relegated to Primera B (second division).

== Current teams ==
Clubs registered for the 2025 season:

| Club | City |
|---|---|
| Banfield | Banfield |
| Belgrano | Cordoba |
| Boca Juniors | Buenos Aires |
| Ferro Carril Oeste | Buenos Aires |
| Gimnasia y Esgrima (LP) | La Plata |
| Huracán | Buenos Aires |
| Independiente | Avellaneda |
| Newell's Old Boys | Rosario |
| Platense | Florida |
| Racing | Avellaneda |
| River Plate | Buenos Aires |
| Rosario Central | Rosario |
| San Lorenzo | Buenos Aires |
| San Luis FC | La Punta |
| S.A.T. | Moreno |
| Talleres (C) | Cordoba |
| UAI Urquiza | Villa Lynch |
| Vélez Sarsfield | Buenos Aires |

== List of champions ==
Below is the list of women's Primera División A champions since the first edition held in 1991. The 2019–20 edition was the only one to be canceled halfway through. This was due to the COVID-19 pandemic. When the National Government allowed football competitions to return in October, AFA organised a smaller tournament called Torneo de Transición 2020, which had a shortened format and took place between November 2020 and January 2021.

- (In bracket, title count):

| Ed. | Season | Champion | Runner-up |
|---|---|---|---|
| 1 | 1991 | River Plate (1) | Boca Juniors |
| 2 | 1992 | Boca Juniors (1) | River Plate |
| 3 | 1993 | River Plate (2) | Boca Juniors |
| 4 | 1994 | River Plate (3) | Boca Juniors |
| 5 | 1995 | River Plate (4) | Boca Juniors |
| 6 | 1996 | River Plate (5) | Boca Juniors |
| 7 | 1997 | River Plate (6) | Boca Juniors |
| 8 | 1998 | Boca Juniors (2) | River Plate |
| 9 | 1999 | Boca Juniors (3) | River Plate |
| 10 | 2000 | Boca Juniors (4) | River Plate |
| 11 | 2001 Apertura | Boca Juniors (5) | River Plate |
| 11 | 2002 Clausura | Boca Juniors (6) | Independiente |
| 12 | 2002 Apertura | River Plate (7) | Independiente |
| 12 | 2003 Clausura | River Plate (8) | Independiente |
| 13 | 2003 Apertura | Boca Juniors (7) | River Plate |
| 13 | 2004 Clausura | Boca Juniors (8) | River Plate |
| 14 | 2004 Apertura | Boca Juniors (9) | San Lorenzo |
| 14 | 2005 Clausura | Boca Juniors (10) | San Lorenzo |
| 15 | 2005 Apertura | Boca Juniors (11) | San Lorenzo |
| 15 | 2006 Clausura | Boca Juniors (12) | San Lorenzo |
| 16 | 2006 Apertura | Boca Juniors (13) | San Lorenzo |
| 16 | 2007 Clausura | Boca Juniors (14) | San Lorenzo |
| 17 | 2007 Apertura | Boca Juniors (15) | River Plate |
| 17 | 2008 Clausura | Boca Juniors (16) | River Plate |
| 18 | 2008 Apertura | San Lorenzo (1) | Boca Juniors |
| 18 | 2009 Clausura | River Plate (9) | Boca Juniors |
| 19 | 2009 Apertura | Boca Juniors (17) | San Lorenzo |
| 19 | 2010 Clausura | River Plate (10) | Boca Juniors |
| 20 | 2010 Apertura | Boca Juniors (18) | River Plate |
| 20 | 2011 Clausura | Boca Juniors (19) | River Plate |
| 21 | 2011 Apertura | Boca Juniors (20) | Estudiantes (LP) |
| 21 | 2012 Clausura | UAI Urquiza (1) | Boca Juniors |
| 22 | 2012 Apertura | Boca Juniors (21) | River Plate |
| 22 | 2013 Clausura | Boca Juniors (22) | UAI Urquiza |
| 23 | 2013 Inicial | Boca Juniors (23) | San Lorenzo |
| 23 | 2014 Final | UAI Urquiza (2) | Boca Juniors |
| 24 | 2015 | San Lorenzo (2) | UAI Urquiza |
| 25 | 2016 | UAI Urquiza (3) | Boca Juniors |
| 26 | 2016–17 | River Plate (11) | Boca Juniors |
| 27 | 2017–18 | UAI Urquiza (4) | Boca Juniors |
| 28 | 2018–19 | UAI Urquiza (5) | Boca Juniors |
| 29 | 2019–20 | (Cancelled due to COVID-19 pandemic) | |
| 30 | 2020 Transición | Boca Juniors (24) | River Plate |
| 31 | 2021 Apertura | San Lorenzo (3) | Boca Juniors |
| 31 | 2021 Clausura | Boca Juniors (25) | UAI Urquiza |
| 32 | 2022 | Boca Juniors (26) | UAI Urquiza |
| 33 | 2023 | Boca Juniors (27) | UAI Urquiza |
| 33 | 2023 Copa de la Liga | Boca Juniors (28) | Belgrano |
| 34 | 2024 Apertura | Boca Juniors (29) | Racing |
| 34 | 2024 Clausura | San Lorenzo (4) | Racing |
| 35 | 2025–I | Newell's Old Boys (1) | Belgrano |
| 35 | 2025–II | Belgrano (1) | Racing |
| 36 | 2026 Apertura | Racing (1) | San Lorenzo (4) |
| 36 | 2026 Clausura | | |

== Titles by club ==
| Rank | Club | Titles | Runners-up | Seasons won |
|---|---|---|---|---|
| 1 | Boca Juniors | 29 | 16 | 1992, 1998, 1999, 2000, 2001 Apertura, 2002 Clausura, 2003 Apertura, 2004 Clausura, 2004 Apertura, 2005 Clausura, 2005 Apertura, 2006 Clausura, 2007 Apertura, 2007 Clausura, 2007 Apertura, 2008 Clausura, 2009 Apertura, 2010 Apertura, 2011 Clausura, 2011 Apertura, 2012 Apertura, 2013 Clausura, 2013 Inicial, 2020, 2021 Clausura, 2022, 2023, 2023 Copa de la Liga, 2024 Apertura |
| 2 | River Plate | 11 | 13 | 1991, 1993, 1994, 1995, 1996, 1997, 2002 Apertura, 2003 Clausura, 2009 Clausura, 2010 Clausura, 2016–17 |
| 3 | UAI Urquiza | 5 | 5 | 2012 Clausura, 2014 Final, 2016, 2017–18, 2018–19 |
| 4 | San Lorenzo | 4 | 9 | 2008 Apertura, 2015, 2021 Apertura, 2024 Clausura |
| 5 | Racing | 1 | 3 | 2026 Apertura |
| 5 | Belgrano | 1 | 2 | 2025–II |
| 5 | Newell's Old Boys | 1 | — | 2025–I |

== National cups ==
=== Trofeo de Campeones ===
- (In bracket, title count):

| Ed. | Season | Champion | Score | Runner-up |
|---|---|---|---|---|
| 1 | 2025 | Belgrano (1) | 0–0 (4–2, p) | Newell's Old Boys |
