= Estudiantes de La Plata (women) =

Estudiantes (LP)
- Full name: Club Estudiantes de La Plata
- Nicknames: Los Pincharratas (The Rat Stabbers), Las Leonas (The Lions)
- Founded: 1997; 29 years ago
- Chairman: Juan Sebastián Verón
- Manager: Daniel Añon
- League: Primera División B
- 2025: 3rd (Zone B)
- Website: https://www.estudiantesdelaplata.com/futbol/futbol-femenino/
Home colours	Away colours

Estudiantes de La Plata Women is the women's football section of Argentine football club Estudiantes de La Plata, based in the city of La Plata, in Buenos Aires Province. The squad currently plays in the Primera División B, the second division of Argentine football league system.

The women's football section began as an amateur team of the institution in 1997 when it began to compete, albeit uninterruptedly, in the official tournaments of the Argentine Football Association.

== History ==
The first match of women's football club as an amateur team for Estudiantes was played in 1997, the season since it has participated continuously in the official tournaments organized by the AFA. The section was founded and promoted in the institution by Lorena Irene Berdula, considered the first women's football coach in Argentina who also founded a school for the development of this discipline.

Before the start of the 2019–20 season, Antonela Guarracino, one of the eight players from the institution who signed a professional contract, became the first player in this section to score a goal in the professional era of AFA women's football.
