= Campeonato de Fútbol Femenino de Primera División C =

Football league in Argentina

Primera División C
- Organising body: AFA
- Founded: 14 September 2019; 7 years ago
- Country: Argentina
- Confederation: CONMEBOL
- Number of clubs: 25
- Level on pyramid: 3
- Promotion to: Primera División B

The Campeonato de Fútbol Femenino de Primera División C (English: First Division C Women's Football Championship), also known as the Tercera División Femenina (English: Women's Third Division), is the third-highest division of women's football in Argentina. It was founded in 2019, after the foundation of 16 new teams to the division which is run by the Argentine Football Association. Unión were included also.

== Champions ==
Ed.	Season	Champion	Runner-up
1	2019–20	(abandoned) (Note: On 28 April 2020, AFA decided to abandon the competition and declare the season finished due to the COVID-19 pandemic with no champion crowned. All official football competitions were suspended on 17 March 2020.)	
2	2020	Vélez Sarsfield	San Miguel
3	2021	Belgrano	Claypole
4	2022	San Luis	Talleres (C)
5	2023	Unión	Aldosivi
6	2024	Aldosivi	Estrella del Sur
7	2025	Luján	Claypole

== Titles by club ==
Rank	Club	Titles	Seasons won
1	Aldosivi	1	2024
1	Belgrano	1	2021
1	Luján	1	2025
1	San Luis	1	2022
1	Unión	1	2023
1	Vélez Sarsfield	1	2020
