= Rosario Central (women) =

- Full name: Club Atlético Rosario Central
- Nickname(s): Las Canallas (The Rabbles); Las Guerreras (The Warriors)
- Founded: 2019; 6 years ago
- Ground: Gigante de Arroyito, Rosario, Argentina
- Capacity: 41,654
- President: Rodolfo Di Pollina
- Manager: Roxana Vallejos
- League: Campeonato de Fútbol Femenino
- Website: https://rosariocentral.com/plantel-femenino/
Home colours	Away colours

Club Atlético Rosario Central Women's is the women's football section of the homonymous sports club. The squad currently plays in the Campeonato de Fútbol Femenino, the first division of the Argentine league system.

Since 2017, Las Canallas (The Rabbels), achieved a string of titles from Casildense, Apertura y Clausura de la Asociación Rosarina de Fútbol and being runners-up in the first edition of the Copa Santa Fe Femenino. In addition, Rosario Central was the first team from the interior to participate in the women's first division.

In 2018, Rosario Central played a preliminary friendly against Estudiantes de La Plata, winning 3 to 0 with goals from Virginia Gómez at the 22nd minutes of the first half, Erica Lonigro at the 55th minute, scoring the team's second goal, and in the 67th minute, Maira Sánchez scored the last goal of the match. The friendly was developed thanks to #ProyectoNovlermoCARC for the fight for equality.
