= Sindy Ramírez =

Uruguayan football and futsal player (born 1991)

Personal information
- Full name: Sindy Noelia Ramírez Acosta
- Date of birth: 28 January 1991 (age 35)
- Place of birth: Sauce, Uruguay
- Height: 1.72 m (5 ft 7 1/2 in)
- Positions: Forward (football); Pivot (futsal)

Team information
- Current team: San Lorenzo (football and futsal)

Senior career*
Years	Team	Apps	(Gls)
- San Lorenzo (football)
- San Lorenzo (futsal)

International career^{‡}
2018–	Uruguay (football)	3	(1)
- * Club domestic league appearances and goals ‡ National team caps and goals as of 12 April 2018

Sindy Noelia Ramírez Acosta (born 28 January 1991) is a Uruguayan footballer and a futsal player who plays as a forward and a pivot for Argentine club San Lorenzo de Almagro (both football and futsal sides) and the Uruguay women's national football team.

== International career ==
Ramírez played for Uruguay in the 2018 Copa América Femenina.

=== International goals ===
Scores and results list Uruguay's goal tally first

No.	Date	Venue	Opponent	Score	Result	Competition
1	12 April 2018	Estadio La Portada, La Serena, Chile	Paraguay	1–0	1–2	2018 Copa América Femenina
