= Club Atlético Huracán (women) =

Huracán
- Full name: Club Atlético Huracán
- Nickname(s): Globo ("Balloon"); Quemeros ("Burners")
- Founded: 1998; 27 years ago
- League: Campeonato Femenino
- Website: https://cahuracan.com/
| Home colours | Away colours |

Club Atlético Huracán women's team (Spanish pronunciation: [uɾaˈkan]) is the women's football team of Argentine sports club Club Atlético Huracán. Established in 1998, where they compete in the Campeonato de Fútbol Femenino.
