= San Lorenzo de Almagro (women) =

San Lorenzo
- Full name: Club Atlético San Lorenzo de Almagro
- Nicknames: Las Santitas; Ciclón; Cuervas
- Founded: 16 December 1993; 32 years ago
- Ground: Estadio Pedro Bidegain, Flores, Buenos Aires
- Capacity: 47,964
- Chairman: Horacio Arreceygor
- Manager: Nicolás Basualdo
- League: Campeonato de Fútbol Femenino
- 2023: 8th
- Website: https://sanlorenzo.com.ar/deportes/futbol-femenino/noticias
Home colours	Away colours	Third colours

San Lorenzo de Almagro Femenino is the women's football section of the San Lorenzo de Almagro sports club based in Buenos Aires, Argentina. They currently play in the Campeonato de Fútbol Femenino, the first division of women's football in Argentina.

== History ==
Las Santitas, as its players are called, are one of the more successful women's football teams in Argentina. Within its recorded history, they have won three Primera División titles (2008 Apertura, 2015 and 2021 Apertura). In 2008 San Lorenzo become the first club other than Boca Juniors and River Plate to win a title. They were also the first Argentine team to play in Copa Libertadores Femenina in 2009, its male counterpart having achieved the same in Copa Libertadores in 1960.

San Lorenzo are one of the only four clubs to be champion of the first division, along with Boca, River and UAI Urquiza.

On 12 April 2019, San Lorenzo became the first Argentine women's football club with professional status. In total, 15 women became the first professional women's footballers in Argentina: Eliana Medina, Debora Molina, Sindy Ramírez, Cecilia López, Florencia Coronel, Federica Silvera, Milagros Vargas, Maricel Pereyra, Rocío Vázquez, Rocío Correa, Lavinia Antequera, Vanina Preininger, Ariana Álvarez, Florencia Salazar and Macarena Sánchez.

== Players ==
=== Current squad ===
As of July 2023

Note: Flags indicate national team as defined under FIFA eligibility rules; some limited exceptions apply. Players may hold more than one non-FIFA nationality.

No.	Pos.	Nation	Player
1	GK	ARG	Solana Pereyra
2	DF	ARG	Gisel Vidal
3	DF	ARG	Ludmila Oporto
4	DF	ARG	Cecilia López
5	MF	COL	Naila Imbachi
6	MF	ARG	Karen Venica
7	DF	ARG	Florencia Coronel
8	MF	ARG	Maricel Pereyra
9	MF	PAR	Juana Fonseca
10	MF	ARG	Eliana Andrea Medina
11	FW	ARG	Micaela Cabrera
12	GK	ARG	Lorena Salas
13	MF	URU	Federica Silvera
14	FW	ARG	Fernanda Grecco
15	MF	COL	Daniela Camargo
16	DF	ARG	Virginia Gómez

No.	Pos.	Nation	Player
17	FW	ARG	Guadalupe Miño
18	DF	ARG	Karen Puentes
19	MF	ARG	Carolina Imbrogiano
20	MF	ARG	Lucia Enrique
21	FW	ARG	Paula Ugarte
22	MF	ARG	Rocío Vázquez
23	MF	ARG	Juliana Angeli
24	FW	ARG	Paz Bustingorri
25	MF	ARG	Sabina Coronel
26	GK	ARG	Camila Espindola
27	DF	ARG	Margarita Guzmán
28	MF	ARG	Luciana Zacmon
30	MF	ARG	Brisa Gallo
31	DF	ARG	Catalina Sclauzero
32	DF	ARG	Camila Ruiz
33	MF	ARG	Noel Gervasoni

=== Notable players ===
==== FIFA World Cup participants ====
List of players that were called up for a FIFA Women's World Cup while playing for San Lorenzo de Almagro. In brackets, the tournament played:

- (Argentina) Florencia Quiñones (2007)
- (Argentina) Florencia Mandrile (2007)
- (Argentina) Analía Almeida (2007)

== Honours ==
- Campeonato de Fútbol Femenino (3): 2008 Apertura, 2015, 2021 Apertura
