= Campeonato de Fútbol Femenino de Primera División B =

Football league in Argentina

Primera División B
- Organising body: AFA
- Founded: 3 April 2016; 10 years ago
- Country: Argentina
- Confederation: CONMEBOL
- Number of clubs: 22
- Level on pyramid: 2
- Promotion to: Primera División A
- Relegation to: Primera División C
- Current champions: Rosario Central (2026)

The Campeonato de Fútbol Femenino de Primera División B (English: First Division B Women's Football Championship), also known as the Segunda División Femenina (English: Women's Second Division), is the second-highest division of women's football in Argentina.

It was established in 2016, after the Argentine Football Association decided to separate the Campeonato de Fútbol Femenino into two divisions, based on the final results in the 2015 season. The creation of the second division allowed more teams to enter Primera División B. Since the 2018-19 season, the worst-placed teams have been relegated to the Primera División C, the third division.

== History ==
=== 2016 ===
The first season began on 3 April 2016 with 14 teams that added the debuting teams and the teams that had descended from the Primera División in the 2015 season. These clubs were Almagro, Atlanta, Bella Vista (Córdoba), Defensores Unidos, Defensores del Chaco, Deportivo Morón, Excursionistas, Hebraica, El Porvenir, Liniers, Lujan, Villa San Carlos, Leandro N. Alem and Fernando Cáceres FC, although Bella Vista and Leandro N. Alem left before starting the season while Almagro did during it. The season was a round trip of everyone against everyone. On 25 September, Villa San Carlos was proclaimed champion and were promoted to Primera División A while El Porvenir and Atlanta, which finished second and third respectively, were also promoted.

== Champions ==
Ed.	Season	Champion	Runner-up	Torneo Reducido winner
1	2016	Villa San Carlos	El Porvenir	–
2	2016–17	Deportivo Morón	Excursionistas	–
3	2017–18	Independiente	Lanús	Racing
4	2018–19	Gimnasia y Esgrima (LP)	S.A.T.	S.A.T.
5	2019–20	(abandoned) (Note: On 28 April 2020, AFA decided to abandon the competition and declare the season finished due to the COVID-19 pandemic with no champion crowned. All official football competitions were suspended on 17 March 2020.)		
6	2020	Deportivo Español	Comunicaciones	–
7	2021	Estudiantes (BA)	Ferro Carril Oeste	–
8	2022	Belgrano	Banfield	Banfield
9	2023	San Luis	Talleres (C)	Newell's Old Boys
10	2024	Talleres (C)	Defensores de Belgrano	Vélez Sarsfield
11	2025	Unión	Lanús	Lanús
12	2026	Rosario Central	Platense	All Boys

== Titles by club ==
Rank	Club	Titles	Seasons won
1	Belgrano	1	2022
1	Deportivo Español	1	2020
1	Deportivo Morón	1	2016–17
1	Estudiantes (BA)	1	2021
1	Gimnasia y Esgrima (LP)	1	2018–19
1	Independiente	1	2017–18
1	Rosario Central	1	2026
1	San Luis	1	2023
1	Talleres (C)	1	2024
1	Unión	1	2025
1	Villa San Carlos	1	2016
