= 2022 South American Under-20 Women's Championship squads =

This article describes about the squads for the 2022 South American Under-20 Women's Football Championship.

== Group A ==
=== Chile ===
The squad was announced on 25 March 2022.

Head coach: Andrés Castro

No.	Pos.	Player	Date of birth (age)	Club
1	GK	Antonia Canales	16 October 2002 (aged 19)	(Football Federation of Chile) Colo-Colo
12	GK	Ignacia Bustos	13 August 2004 (aged 17)	(Football Federation of Chile) Fernández Vial
22	GK	Catalina Mellado	23 May 2006 (aged 15)	(Football Federation of Chile) Colo-Colo
3	DF	Alexia Gallardo	16 December 2002 (aged 19)	(Football Federation of Chile) Deportes Puerto Montt
4	DF	Milenka Pavez	11 February 2002 (aged 20)	(Football Federation of Chile) Everton
5	DF	Catalina Figueroa	28 January 2005 (aged 17)	(Football Federation of Chile) Universidad Católica
13	DF	Mariana Morales	14 July 2003 (aged 18)	(Football Federation of Chile) Universidad de Chile
16	DF	Monserratt González	30 October 2003 (aged 18)	(Football Federation of Chile) Universidad de Chile
17	DF	Gali Espinoza	27 November 2003 (aged 18)	(Football Federation of Chile) Universidad Católica
19	DF	Claudia Salfate	6 August 2003 (aged 18)	(Football Federation of Chile) Everton
2	MF	Karen Fuentes	3 August 2004 (aged 17)	(Football Federation of Chile) Universidad de Chile
6	MF	Elisa Durán	16 January 2002 (aged 20)	(Football Federation of Chile) Colo-Colo
8	MF	Llanka Groff	5 November 2002 (aged 19)	(Football Federation of Chile) Universidad de Chile
11	MF	Michelle Olivares	4 April 2002 (aged 20)	(Football Federation of Chile) Colo-Colo
14	MF	Millaray Cortés	30 June 2004 (aged 17)	(Football Federation of Chile) Universidad Católica
18	MF	Tamara Mansilla	6 January 2003 (aged 19)	(Football Federation of Chile) Colo-Colo
21	MF	Margarita Collinao	12 December 2003 (aged 18)	(Football Federation of Chile) Colo-Colo
7	FW	Isidora Olave	23 April 2002 (aged 19)	(Football Federation of Chile) Colo-Colo
9	FW	Sonya Keefe	11 April 2003 (aged 18)	(Football Federation of Chile) Universidad de Chile
10	FW	Valentina Navarrete	13 July 2003 (aged 18)	(Football Federation of Chile) Santiago Morning
15	FW	Valentina Delgado	23 February 2003 (aged 19)	(Football Federation of Chile) Everton
20	FW	Mary Valencia	8 February 2003 (aged 19)	(Football Federation of Chile) Santiago Morning

=== Colombia ===
The squad was announced on 2 April 2022.

Head coach: Carlos Paniagua

No.	Pos.	Player	Date of birth (age)	Club
1	GK	Natalia Giraldo	19 May 2003 (aged 18)	(Colombian Football Federation) América de Cali
12	GK	Valentina González	7 February 2002 (aged 20)	(Colombian Football Federation) Equidad
22	GK	Valery Restrepo	10 September 2004 (aged 17)	(Colombian Football Federation) Independiente Medellín
2	DF	Mary José Álvarez	22 August 2005 (aged 16)	(Colombian Football Federation) Independiente Medellín
3	DF	Ángela Barón	18 September 2003 (aged 18)	(United States Soccer Federation) D´Feeters Kick Soccer Club
4	DF	Kaili Siso	1 March 2003 (aged 19)	(Colombian Football Federation) Llaneros F.C.
13	DF	Ana María Guzmán	11 June 2005 (aged 16)	(Colombian Football Federation) Deportivo Pereira
17	DF	Kelly Caicedo	26 November 2002 (aged 19)	(Colombian Football Federation) Deportivo Cali
5	MF	Katherine Valbuena	6 July 2003 (aged 18)	(Colombian Football Federation) América de Cali
6	MF	Ilana Izquierdo	14 June 2002 (aged 19)	(United States Soccer Federation) University of Southern Mississippi
7	MF	Gisela Robledo	13 May 2003 (aged 18)	(Royal Spanish Football Federation) UDG Tenerife
8	MF	Camila Reyes	11 May 2002 (aged 19)	(Colombian Football Federation) Independiente Santa Fe
9	MF	Gabriela Rodríguez	10 May 2005 (aged 16)	(Colombian Football Federation) América de Cali
10	MF	Liced Serna	1 February 2002 (aged 20)	(Colombian Football Federation) Independiente Medellín
14	MF	Mariana Muñoz	2 January 2003 (aged 19)	(Colombian Football Federation) Atlético Nacional
16	MF	Juana Ortegón	6 August 2006 (aged 15)	(Colombian Football Federation) Deportivo Cali
20	MF	Wendy Bonilla	8 July 2002 (aged 19)	(Colombian Football Federation) América de Cali
11	FW	Greicy Landázury	1 August 2004 (aged 17)	(Colombian Football Federation) Independiente Medellín
15	FW	Sintia Cabezas	1 May 2006 (aged 15)	(Colombian Football Federation) Escuela Carlos Sarmiento Lora
18	FW	Íngrid Guerra	2 April 2003 (aged 19)	(Colombian Football Federation) Deportivo Cali
19	FW	Gabriela Ureña	29 March 2003 (aged 19)	(Colombian Football Federation) Llaneros F.C.
21	FW	Ximena Llerena	1 January 2003 (aged 19)	(Colombian Football Federation) Equidad

=== Argentina ===
The squad was announced on 31 March 2022.

Head coach: Germán Portanova

No.	Pos.	Player	Date of birth (age)	Club
1	GK	Lara Esponda	8 November 2005 (aged 16)	(Argentine Football Association) River Plate
12	GK	Alejandra Cabrera	14 April 2002 (aged 19)	(Argentine Football Association) Lanús
2	DF	Giuliana González	18 June 2002 (aged 19)	(Argentine Football Association) River Plate
3	DF	Celeste Dos Santos	4 November 2003 (aged 18)	(Argentine Football Association) Boca Juniors
5	DF	Catalina Roggerone	3 April 2003 (aged 19)	(Argentine Football Association) Godoy Cruz
6	DF	Catalina Alfonso	21 April 2003 (aged 18)	(Royal Spanish Football Federation) UE Cornellà
13	DF	Anela Nigito	22 June 2004 (aged 17)	(United States Soccer Federation) CSU Bakersfield
16	DF	Belén Ludueña	7 June 2004 (aged 17)	(Argentine Football Association) River Plate
17	DF	Morena Chachagua	2 January 2002 (aged 20)	(Argentine Football Association) SAT
4	MF	Sofía Domínguez	16 December 2005 (aged 16)	(Argentine Football Association) River Plate
8	MF	Maricel Pereyra	11 May 2002 (aged 19)	(Argentine Football Association) San Lorenzo
9	MF	Nina Nicosia	2 February 2003 (aged 19)	(United States Soccer Federation) Chicago Mustangs
10	MF	Dalila Ippólito	24 March 2002 (aged 20)	(Italian Football Federation) Pomigliano
14	MF	Magalí Natta	8 March 2003 (aged 19)	(Argentine Football Association) Platense
15	MF	Catalina Ongaro	26 March 2003 (aged 19)	(Argentine Football Association) UAI Urquiza
21	MF	Agostina Holzheier	30 September 2003 (aged 18)	(Argentine Football Association) River Plate
22	MF	Lourdes González	8 February 2004 (aged 18)	(Argentine Football Association) Platense
7	FW	Chiara Singarella	5 December 2003 (aged 18)	(United States Soccer Federation) Kennesaw University
11	FW	Paulina Gamaglia	21 March 2003 (aged 19)	(United States Soccer Federation) Houston Dash
18	FW	Estefanía Palomar	7 January 2003 (aged 19)	(Argentine Football Association) Boca Juniors
19	FW	Brisa de Ángelis	30 September 2002 (aged 19)	(Argentine Football Association) Ferro
20	FW	Yuliana Sanabria	26 January 2002 (aged 20)	(Argentine Football Association) Platense

=== Venezuela ===
The squad was announced on 3 April 2022.

Head coach: Pamela Conti

No.	Pos.	Player	Date of birth (age)	Club
1	GK	Hilary Azuaje	27 October 2004 (aged 17)	
12	GK	Ashley Pulgar	18 January 2003 (aged 19)	
22	GK	Ariagny Becerra	17 July 2002 (aged 19)	
2	DF	Fabiola Solórzano	22 October 2003 (aged 18)	
4	DF	Bárbara Russo	30 January 2003 (aged 19)	
7	DF	Gabriela Angulo	27 February 2004 (aged 18)	
13	DF	Sabrina Araujo-Elorza	11 May 2004 (aged 17)	
17	DF	Zulaycar Milano	17 July 2002 (aged 19)	
20	DF	Isabella Tabja	23 April 2003 (aged 18)	
3	MF	Alexineth Rosario	6 June 2003 (aged 18)	
5	MF	Naileth Rangel	6 April 2002 (aged 20)	
6	MF	Ana Paula Fraiz	13 February 2003 (aged 19)	
8	MF	Marianyela Jiménez	16 April 2004 (aged 17)	
9	MF	Jaimar Torrealba	4 September 2003 (aged 18)	
10	MF	Bárbara Olivieri	24 February 2002 (aged 20)	(Mexican Football Federation) C.F. Monterrey
11	MF	Raiderlin Carrasco	11 July 2002 (aged 19)	
15	DF	Alai Araujo-Elorza	22 February 2002 (aged 20)	
16	MF	Floriangel Apostol	7 September 2005 (aged 16)	
18	MF	Bárbara Martínez Flores	22 April 2003 (aged 18)	
14	FW	Karen Vilaú	23 November 2004 (aged 17)	
19	FW	Kimberlyn Campos	29 October 2003 (aged 18)	
21	FW	Génesis Hernández	19 June 2006 (aged 15)	

=== Peru ===
The squad was announced on 2 April 2022.

Head coach: Conrad Flores

No.	Pos.	Player	Date of birth (age)	Club
1	GK	Lucia Arcos	12 February 2004 (aged 18)	(Royal Spanish Football Federation) RCD Espanyol
12	GK	María Fernanda Dávila	25 October 2003 (aged 18)	(Peruvian Football Federation) Sporting Cristal
22	GK	Fernanda Lizárraga	17 June 2004 (aged 17)	(Peruvian Football Federation) Alianza Lima
2	DF	Fabiola Amaro	15 January 2003 (aged 19)	(Peruvian Football Federation) Universitario
3	DF	Yamile Rivas	16 October 2004 (aged 17)	(Peruvian Football Federation) Alianza Lima
4	DF	Braelym Llamoca	30 January 2002 (aged 20)	(United States Soccer Federation) UC Riverside
5	DF	Gianella Romero	22 October 2002 (aged 19)	(Peruvian Football Federation) Alianza Lima
6	DF	Rosa Ross	9 October 2003 (aged 18)	(Peruvian Football Federation) Sporting Cristal
13	DF	Wendy Rivera	28 October 2002 (aged 19)	(Peruvian Football Federation) Universitario
14	DF	María Ruíz	10 June 2003 (aged 18)	(Peruvian Football Federation) Universitario
20	DF	Shayna Gonzalez	6 October 2004 (aged 17)	(French Football Federation) US Saint-Malo
21	DF	Noelia Lumbre	20 December 2003 (aged 18)	(Peruvian Football Federation) Sporting Cristal
7	MF	Belén Arguedas	23 August 2004 (aged 17)	(Peruvian Football Federation) Sporting Cristal
8	MF	Teresa Wowk	10 January 2002 (aged 20)	(United States Soccer Federation) Kennesaw State University
10	MF	Allison Azabache	15 December 2003 (aged 18)	(Peruvian Football Federation) Sporting Cristal
15	MF	Kely Peralta	14 August 2003 (aged 18)	(Peruvian Football Federation) FC Killas
16	MF	Jhosely Gamarra	24 June 2002 (aged 19)	(Peruvian Football Federation) Sporting Cristal
18	MF	Mía León	22 March 2005 (aged 17)	(United States Soccer Federation) Beach FC
9	FW	Alessia Sanllehi	3 December 2003 (aged 18)	(Peruvian Football Federation) Sporting Cristal
11	FW	Izabella Ruiz	9 January 2002 (aged 20)	(Peruvian Football Federation) FC Killas
17	FW	Helen La Torre	22 August 2003 (aged 18)	(Peruvian Football Federation) FC Killas
19	FW	Azucena Daga	5 December 2003 (aged 18)	(Peruvian Football Federation) Academia Cantolao

== Group B ==
=== Brazil ===
The squad was announced on 18 March 2022.

Head coach: Jonas Urias

No.	Pos.	Player	Date of birth (age)	Club
1	GK	Gabi Barbieri	7 March 2003 (aged 19)	(Brazilian Football Confederation) Internacional
12	GK	Yanne Fonseca	7 January 2003 (aged 19)	(Brazilian Football Confederation) Ferroviária
2	DF	Bruna Nhaia	16 June 2002 (aged 19)	(Brazilian Football Confederation) Santos
3	DF	Tarciane	27 May 2003 (aged 18)	(Brazilian Football Confederation) Corinthians
4	DF	Lauren	13 September 2002 (aged 19)	(Royal Spanish Football Federation) Madrid CFF
6	DF	Ana Clara	31 July 2003 (aged 18)	(Brazilian Football Confederation) São Paulo
13	DF	Laís Giacomel	22 May 2003 (aged 18)	(Brazilian Football Confederation) Grêmio
14	DF	Patricia Maldaner	8 February 2003 (aged 19)	(Brazilian Football Confederation) Grêmio
5	MF	Cris	14 January 2002 (aged 20)	(Brazilian Football Confederation) Flamengo
7	MF	Luany	3 February 2003 (aged 19)	(Brazilian Football Confederation) Grêmio
8	MF	Rafa Levis	26 November 2002 (aged 19)	(Brazilian Football Confederation) Grêmio
10	MF	Analuyza Goiás	14 April 2004 (aged 17)	(Brazilian Football Confederation) Santos
11	MF	Gi Fernandes	23 December 2004 (aged 17)	(Brazilian Football Confederation) Santos
15	MF	Laura Valverde	2 June 2004 (aged 17)	(Brazilian Football Confederation) Santos
16	MF	Letícia Monteiro	13 July 2002 (aged 19)	(Brazilian Football Confederation) Red Bull Bragantino
18	MF	Vitória Yaya	23 January 2002 (aged 20)	(Brazilian Football Confederation) São Paulo
9	FW	Milena Barreto	18 March 2003 (aged 19)	(Brazilian Football Confederation) Internacional
17	FW	Isabelle Guimarães	19 October 2003 (aged 18)	(Brazilian Football Confederation) São Paulo
19	FW	Giovaninha	25 October 2002 (aged 19)	(Royal Spanish Football Federation) Tenerife
20	FW	Carol Lara	13 August 2003 (aged 18)	(Brazilian Football Confederation) América Mineiro
21	FW	Bia	13 February 2003 (aged 19)	(Brazilian Football Confederation) Internacional
22	FW	Layssa	23 May 2003 (aged 18)	(Brazilian Football Confederation) Red Bull Bragantino

=== Paraguay ===
The squad was announced on 31 March 2022.

Head coach: Daniel Almada

No.	Pos.	Player	Date of birth (age)	Club
1	GK	Araceli Leguizamón	6 August 2005 (aged 16)	(Paraguayan Football Association) Cerro Porteño
12	GK	Soledad Belotto	14 August 2003 (aged 18)	(Colombian Football Federation) Junior de Barranquilla
2	DF	Gabriela Ibáñez	18 August 2003 (aged 18)	(Paraguayan Football Association) Resistencia
3	DF	Sofía Almirón	20 January 2004 (aged 18)	(Paraguayan Football Association) Resistencia
4	DF	Gabriela Valdez	25 January 2004 (aged 18)	(Paraguayan Football Association) Olimpia
5	DF	Fiorela Martínez	18 April 2002 (aged 19)	(Paraguayan Football Association) Resistencia
13	DF	Hannah Núñez	6 October 2004 (aged 17)	(Paraguayan Football Association) Resistencia
14	DF	Loren Jara	3 September 2004 (aged 17)	(Paraguayan Football Association) Sol de América
15	DF	Naomi De León	6 May 2005 (aged 16)	(Paraguayan Football Association) Libertad/Limpeño
6	MF	Monserrath Ayala	20 March 2002 (aged 20)	(Brazilian Football Confederation) Atlético
7	MF	Belén Riveros	13 June 2002 (aged 19)	(Paraguayan Football Association) Cerro Porteño
8	MF	Yanina Servín	20 December 2003 (aged 18)	(Paraguayan Football Association) Cerro Porteño
11	MF	Nabila Perruchino	17 March 2003 (aged 19)	(Paraguayan Football Association) Resistencia
16	MF	Luján Ocampos	7 January 2002 (aged 20)	(Paraguayan Football Association) Resistencia
18	MF	Fiona Zaracho	20 July 2002 (aged 19)	(Paraguayan Football Association) Olimpia
19	MF	María Melgarejo	22 June 2002 (aged 19)	(Paraguayan Football Association) Resistencia
20	MF	Milagros Rolón	19 August 2004 (aged 17)	(Paraguayan Football Association) Olimpia
21	MF	Fátima Acosta	7 January 2005 (aged 17)	(Paraguayan Football Association) Resistencia
9	FW	Zunilda Coronel	2 August 2004 (aged 17)	(Paraguayan Football Association) Libertad/Limpeño
10	FW	Erika Cartaman	27 July 2002 (aged 19)	(Paraguayan Football Association) Resistencia
17	FW	Pamela Villalba	2 February 2006 (aged 16)	(Paraguayan Football Association) Nacional/Humaitá
22	FW	Cindy Ramos	1 November 2002 (aged 19)	(Paraguayan Football Association) Olimpia

=== Ecuador ===
The squad was announced on 2 April 2022.

Head coach: Eduardo Moscoso

No.	Pos.	Player	Date of birth (age)	Club
1	GK	Ashley Macías	26 March 2003 (aged 19)	(Ecuadorian Football Federation) Leones del Norte
12	GK	Jomaira Intriago	3 March 2003 (aged 19)	(Ecuadorian Football Federation) El Nacional
22	GK	Jade López	6 November 2004 (aged 17)	(Ecuadorian Football Federation) Independiente del Valle
2	DF	Maria Julia Serrano	29 October 2004 (aged 17)	(Ecuadorian Football Federation) Independiente del Valle
4	DF	Ariana Lomas	17 January 2002 (aged 20)	(Ecuadorian Football Federation) Independiente del Valle
5	DF	Ivette Fernández	12 October 2003 (aged 18)	(Ecuadorian Football Federation) Independiente del Valle
13	DF	Yannell Loza	9 January 2004 (aged 18)	(Ecuadorian Football Federation) Club Ñañas
14	DF	Analiz Zambrano	6 July 2002 (aged 19)	(Ecuadorian Football Federation) Club Ñañas
15	DF	Ingrid Pianda	6 March 2004 (aged 18)	(Ecuadorian Football Federation) D. Ibarra
3	MF	Danna Pacheco	29 March 2002 (aged 20)	(Ecuadorian Football Federation) Independiente del Valle
6	MF	Anahi Naranjo	12 September 2002 (aged 19)	(Ecuadorian Football Federation) Independiente del Valle
7	MF	Camila Paladines	26 September 2002 (aged 19)	(Ecuadorian Football Federation) Independiente del Valle
8	MF	Paulina Rosillo	2 September 2003 (aged 18)	(Ecuadorian Football Federation) Independiente del Valle
11	MF	Emily Arias	16 March 2003 (aged 19)	(Ecuadorian Football Federation) Independiente del Valle
16	MF	Jael Montalvo	20 June 2005 (aged 16)	(Ecuadorian Football Federation) L.D.U. Quito
17	MF	Tatiana Bermeo	20 August 2003 (aged 18)	(Ecuadorian Football Federation) Barcelona S.C.
18	MF	Ashley Reyes	28 May 2004 (aged 17)	
19	MF	Génesis Valdivieso	14 January 2004 (aged 18)	(Ecuadorian Football Federation) Barcelona S.C.
20	MF	Danna Pesántez	29 August 2003 (aged 18)	(Ecuadorian Football Federation) Carneras UPS Fútbol
9	FW	Milagro Barahona	20 June 2002 (aged 19)	(Ecuadorian Football Federation) D. Ibarra
10	FW	Nayely Bolaños	25 February 2003 (aged 19)	(Ecuadorian Football Federation) Independiente del Valle
21	FW	Nikole Riquero	18 April 2002 (aged 19)	(Ecuadorian Football Federation) L.D.U. Quito

=== Uruguay ===
The squad was announced on 18 March 2022.

Head coach: Ariel Longo

No.	Pos.	Player	Date of birth (age)	Club
1	GK	Vanina Sburlati	3 August 2003 (aged 18)	(Uruguayan Football Association) Peñarol
12	GK	Helena Reja	31 January 2004 (aged 18)	(Uruguayan Football Association) Defensor Sporting
2	DF	Adriana Salvagno	17 April 2002 (aged 19)	(Uruguayan Football Association) Peñarol
3	DF	Oriana Fontan	26 January 2002 (aged 20)	(Uruguayan Football Association) Defensor Sporting
4	DF	Florencia Méndez	10 May 2002 (aged 19)	(Uruguayan Football Association) River Plate de San José
6	DF	Sharon López	1 May 2003 (aged 18)	(Uruguayan Football Association) Nacional
13	DF	Lucía Cufré	7 January 2002 (aged 20)	(Uruguayan Football Association) Defensor Sporting
15	DF	Magalí Arias	7 August 2003 (aged 18)	(Uruguayan Football Association) Defensor Sporting
16	DF	Alison Latúa	23 May 2003 (aged 18)	(Uruguayan Football Association) Nacional
20	DF	Josefina Félix	10 June 2004 (aged 17)	(Uruguayan Football Association) Defensor Sporting
22	DF	Valentina Pereira	30 May 2006 (aged 15)	(Uruguayan Football Association) Nacional
7	MF	Juliana Viera	8 May 2002 (aged 19)	(Uruguayan Football Association) Nacional
8	MF	Ángela Gómez	19 August 2002 (aged 19)	(Uruguayan Football Association) Nacional
14	MF	Nikol Laurnaga	1 March 2002 (aged 20)	(Uruguayan Football Association) Atenas
17	MF	Pilar González	29 June 2002 (aged 19)	(Uruguayan Football Association) Peñarol
18	MF	Hevelin Jara	30 July 2002 (aged 19)	(Uruguayan Football Association) Nacional
21	MF	Manuela Maciel	19 March 2002 (aged 20)	(Uruguayan Football Association) River Plate de San José
5	FW	Martina Terra	9 March 2002 (aged 20)	(Uruguayan Football Association) Nacional
9	FW	Wendy Carballo	28 July 2002 (aged 19)	
10	FW	Solange Lemos	27 August 2002 (aged 19)	(Uruguayan Football Association) Nacional
11	FW	Belén Aquino	1 February 2002 (aged 20)	(Uruguayan Football Association) Peñarol
19	FW	Catalina Emanuele	10 December 2002 (aged 19)	(Uruguayan Football Association) San José FC

=== Bolivia ===
Head coach: Pablo Cabanillas Palazuelo

No.	Pos.	Player	Date of birth (age)	Club
1	GK	Alba Tamara Salazar	17 February 2005 (aged 17)	(Bolivian Football Federation) AD Somsardina
12	GK	Camila Danna Irusta	5 February 2003 (aged 19)	(Bolivian Football Federation) The Strongest
22	GK	Erika Paola Sanchez	2 August 2003 (aged 18)	(Bolivian Football Federation) Inter Stars Rush
2	DF	Judith Fabiola Herrera	24 June 2002 (aged 19)	(Bolivian Football Federation) Basco FC
3	DF	Yuditza Jimena Salvatierra	26 April 2003 (aged 18)	(Bolivian Football Federation) Mundo Futuro
4	DF	Valentina Velasquez	30 May 2003 (aged 18)	(Bolivian Football Federation) Wilstermann
5	DF	Sarah Nicol Cruz	24 May 2002 (aged 19)	(Bolivian Football Federation) Bolívar
13	DF	Jhoseline Lizbeth Quispe	17 May 2002 (aged 19)	(Bolivian Football Federation) The Strongest
14	DF	Ingrid Lizeth Guzman	27 June 2003 (aged 18)	(Bolivian Football Federation) The Strongest
19	DF	Virginia Nieves	31 December 2002 (aged 19)	(Bolivian Football Federation) Club Real Tarija
20	DF	Mariana Ortega	17 April 2003 (aged 18)	(Bolivian Football Federation) Real Tomayapo
6	MF	Liliam Lizeth Contreras	10 July 2004 (aged 17)	(Bolivian Football Federation) The Strongest
8	MF	Darling Davinia Melgar	6 January 2004 (aged 18)	(Bolivian Football Federation) Florida
9	MF	Luana San Miguel	5 November 2002 (aged 19)	(Bolivian Football Federation) Wilstermann
11	MF	Jhylian Mary Mamani	29 December 2004 (aged 17)	(Bolivian Football Federation) The Strongest
15	MF	Samantha Nicole Alurralde	4 January 2004 (aged 18)	(Bolivian Football Federation) The Strongest
16	MF	Brizna Yoelin Sanchez	5 January 2003 (aged 19)	(Bolivian Football Federation) The Strongest
17	MF	Nicol Zamara Paredes	27 July 2004 (aged 17)	(Bolivian Football Federation) The Strongest
21	MF	Andrea Brigitte Peña	27 June 2002 (aged 19)	(Bolivian Football Federation) Oriente Petrolero
7	FW	Tatiana Soleto	6 November 2005 (aged 16)	(Bolivian Football Federation) Calleja
10	FW	Majhely Romero	20 January 2003 (aged 19)	(Bolivian Football Federation) The Strongest
18	FW	Mishelle Pereyra	2 March 2004 (aged 18)	(Bolivian Football Federation) Santa Cruz FC
