= Kathalina Guerrero =

Chilean footballer

Personal information
- Full name: Kathalina Adriana Guerrero Bolados
- Date of birth: 4 November 2002 (age 24)
- Place of birth: Arica, Chile
- Position: Forward

Team information
- Current team: Deportes Iquique (on loan from Universidad de Chile)

Youth career
- San Marcos
- 2019: CODE Iquique

Senior career*
Years	Team	Apps	(Gls)
2019–2020	CODE Iquique		
2020–2025	Deportes Iquique	27+	(4+)
2026–	Universidad de Chile	0	(0)
2026–	→ Deportes Iquique (loan)		

International career^{‡}
2024–	Chile	2	(0)
- * Club domestic league appearances and goals ‡ National team caps and goals as of 29 February 2024

Kathalina Adriana Guerrero Bolados (born 4 November 2002) is a Chilean footballer who plays as a forward for Deportes Iquique on loan from Universidad de Chile.

== Club career ==
A product of the women's team of San Marcos de Arica, in 2019 she moved to Colegio Deportivo Iquique (CODE Iquique), the women's team of Deportes Iquique until 2020. Since then, Guerrero has played for the first team of both CODE Iquique and Deportes Iquique.

On 13 January 2026, Guerrero joined Universidad de Chile. On 9 March of the same year, she returned to Deportes Iquique on loan for a year.

== International career ==
In August 2023, Guerrero was called up to the training microcycle of the Chile national team under Luis Mena.

In February 2024, she replaced Agustina Heyermann in the Chile squad for the matches against Jamaica on 23 and 27 of the same month. She made her debut in the first match, a 5–1 win, by replacing Yenny Acuña at minute 73. Subsequently, she made another appearance in the second match, a 1–0 win, as a starting player.
