= Thomas Coulombe =

Chilean footballer

Personal information
- Full name: Thomas Dean Coulombe Montenegro
- Date of birth: 5 July 2007 (age 19)
- Place of birth: Barcelona, Spain
- Height: 1.82 m (6 ft 0 in)
- Position: Left-back

Team information
- Current team: Espanyol B
- Number: 2

Youth career
- PB Cinc Copes
- Badalona
- Espanyol
- 2024–2025: → Damm (loan)

Senior career*
Years	Team	Apps	(Gls)
2026–	Espanyol B	8	(2)

International career^{‡}
2026–	Chile U20	5	(1)
2026–	Chile	1	(0)
- * Club domestic league appearances and goals as of 17 November 2026 ‡ National team caps and goals as of 17 November 2026

Thomas Dean Coulombe Montenegro (born 5 July 2007) is a professional footballer who plays as a left-back for Espanyol B. Born in Spain, he plays for the Chile national team.

== Club career ==
Born in Barcelona, Spain, Coulombe was with PB Cinc Copes and Badalona before joining the Espanyol youth ranks. He was loaned out to CF Damm for the 2024–25 season.

Back to Espanyol, Coulombe was promoted to Espanyol B for the 2026–27 season.

== International career ==
Coulombe has represented Chile at under-20 level in friendly matches against Peru, Brazil and Mexico during 2026.

At senior level, Coulombe was called up to the Chile national team as a guest player for the friendly matches against Canada, United States and Mexico in September and October 2026. Later, he made his debut in the 0–0 against Colombia on 17 November 2026 replacing Gabriel Suazo at the minute 85.

== Personal life ==
Coulombe was born in Barcelona, Spain, to an American father and a Chilean mother called Mariana Montenegro. He also holds American citizenship.

Coulombe is the brother of the Chile international footballer Sofia Coulombe.
