= Viviana Torres =

Chilean footballer (born 1993)

Personal information
- Full name: Viviana Margot Torres Retamal
- Date of birth: 19 December 1993 (age 32)
- Position: Forward

Team information
- Current team: Huachipato

Senior career*
Years	Team	Apps	(Gls)
2014–2018	Naval		
2018–2019	Fernández Vial		
2019	Delfín SC		
2020–2021	Universidad de Concepción		
2022	Fernández Vial		
2023	Fernández Vial	7	(4)
2024–	Huachipato		

International career^{‡}
2021–	Chile	1	(0)
- * Club domestic league appearances and goals ‡ National team caps and goals as of 12 July 2023

Viviana Margot Torres Retamal (born 19 December 1993) is a Chilean football player who plays as a forward for Huachipato.

== Club career ==
Torres played for Naval from 2014 to 2018. After the club turned into Fernández Vial, she went on with them until 2019.

In 2019, Torres moved to Ecuador and joined Delfín SC along with her fellow Chilean player Daniela Ceballos. Shortly, both players returned to Chile and joined Universidad de Concepción.

In 2022, Torres returned to Fernández Vial. After being a free agent during the first half of 2023, she rejoined Fernández Vial in the second half of the same year, making seven appearances with four goals.

In 2024, she joined Huachipato.

== International career ==
Torres debuted for Chile on 23 October 2021 in a friendly game against Colombia.
