= Valentina Diaz =

Valentina Diaz may refer to:

- Valentina Diaz (Devious Maids), a fictional character on American television comedy-drama series Devious Maids
- Valentina Díaz (born 2001), Chilean footballer
