= Millaray =

Feminine given name of Mapuche origin

- Gender: Feminine
- Language: Mapuche

Origin
- Language: Mapuche
- Meaning: Golden flower
- Region of origin: Chile and Argentina

Millaray is a feminine given name of Mapuche origin. It means "golden flower" (from milla "gold" and rayen "flower"). As of 2010, it was the 49th most popular name in Chile.

== People named Millaray ==
- Millaray Cortés (born 2004), Chilean footballer
- Millaray Viera (born 1987), Chilean actress
