= Daniela Ceballos =

Chilean footballer (born 1993)

Personal information
- Full name: Daniela Alejandra Ceballos Gallegos
- Date of birth: 30 January 1993 (age 33)
- Place of birth: Temuco, Chile
- Position: Left-back

Youth career
- Unión Temuco

Senior career*
Years	Team	Apps	(Gls)
2011–2019	Deportes Temuco		
2019	Delfín SC		
2019–2023	Universidad de Concepción	47	(4)
2024	Deportes Antofagasta	14	(1)
2025	Deportes Recoleta		
2026	Deportes Temuco	23	(0)
- * Club domestic league appearances and goals as of 12 September 2026

Daniela Alejandra Ceballos Gallegos (born 30 January 1993) is a Chilean professional footballer who plays as a left-back.

== Club career ==
Born in Temuco, Chile, Ceballos began playing at amateur level in neighbourhoods from Padre Las Casas at the age of fifteen. She then joined Unión Temuco, and began her senior career with Deportes Temuco in 2011, after Unión Temuco folded.

On 29 July 2019, Ceballos joined Ecuadorian club Delfín SC on a permanent deal, alongside fellow Chilean Viviana Torres. However, both players returned to Chile just a few months later, with Ceballos subsequently joining Universidad de Concepción.

At the end of the 2021 season, she was selected in the Campeonato Nacional Fútbol Femenino's Ideal Team.

On 11 March 2023, Ceballos became one of the eleven footballers who signed their first professional contracts with Universidad de Concepción. In January 2024, she announced the end of her stint with the club after forty seven matches with four goals.

On 26 February 2024, Ceballos signed with fellow Chilean side Deportes Antofagasta. The next two years, she played for Deportes Recoleta and Deportes Temuco.

== International career ==
In September 2021, Ceballos received her first call-up to the Chilean senior national team, for a training camp in preparation to the 2022 Copa América.

== Personal life ==
After graduating as a nurse at the Autonomous University of Chile, Ceballos worked part-time at the emergency medicine facility of a local hospital, while pursuing her footballing career.

During the COVID-19 pandemic, she worked as a part-time contributor for the Chilean Football Federation, being involved in the supervision of safety protocols, as well as COVID-19 rapid testing, in national football competitions.

== Honours ==
Individual

- Premios Contragolpe - Ideal Team: 2021
