= Mariana Morales =

Chilean footballer (born 2003)

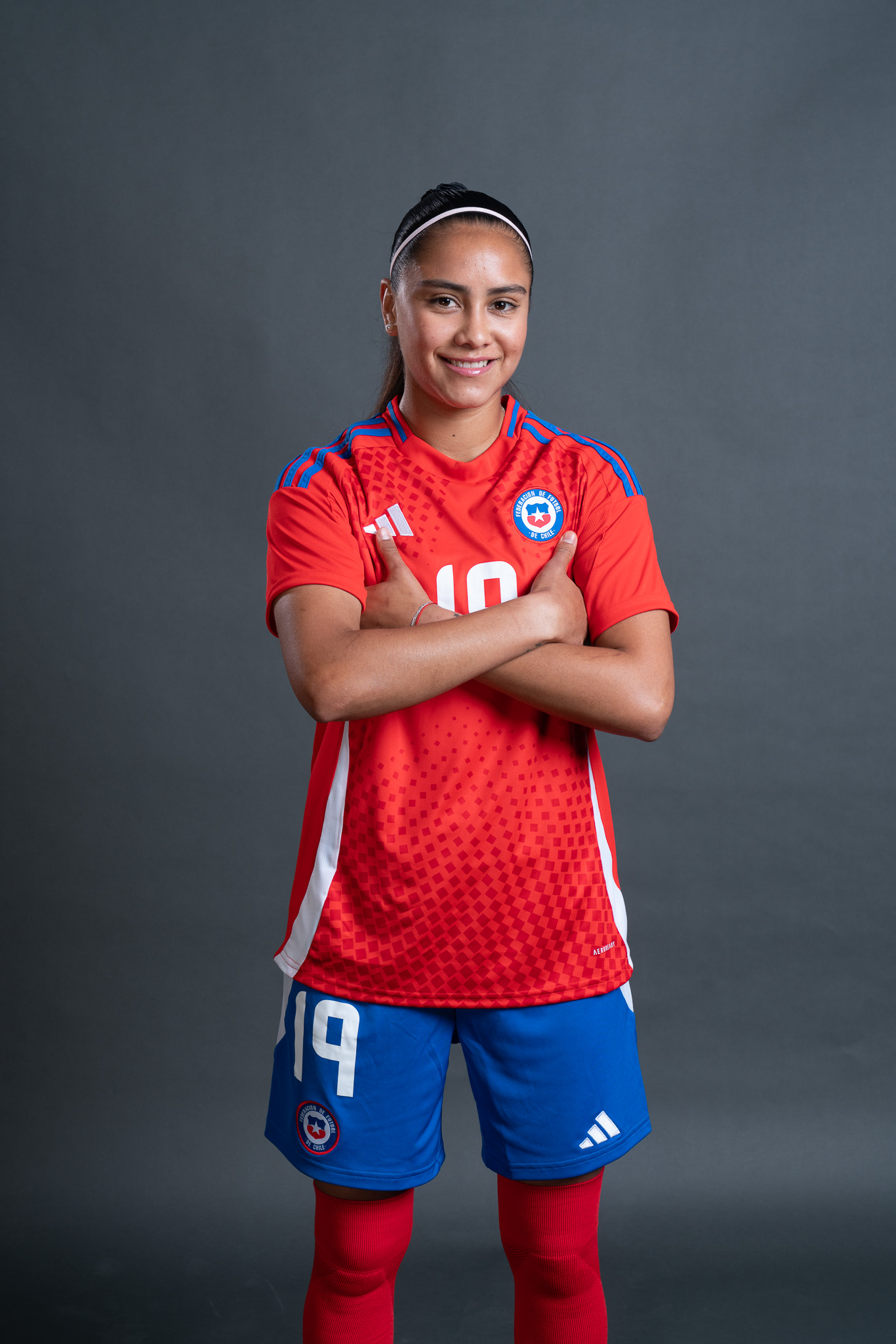

Personal information
- Full name: Mariana Ignacia Morales Bustamante
- Date of birth: 14 July 2003 (age 23)
- Place of birth: La Calera, Chile
- Height: 1.62 m (5 ft 4 in)
- Position: Defender

Team information
- Current team: Universidad de Chile
- Number: 5

Youth career
- 2012–2019: Universidad de Chile

Senior career*
| Years | Team | Apps | (Gls) |
| 2020– | Universidad de Chile | | |
| 2021 | → Everton (loan) | | |

International career^{‡}
- Chile U17
| 2022 | Chile U20 | | |
| 2025– | Chile | 1 | (0) |
- * Club domestic league appearances and goals ‡ National team caps and goals as of 26 October 2025

Mariana Ignacia Morales Bustamante (born 14 July 2003) is a Chilean footballer who plays as a defender for Universidad de Chile and the Chile women's national team. She can also operate as a defensive midfielder.

== Club career ==
Born in La Calera, Chile, Morales joined the Universidad de Chile youth ranks in 2012, aged 9. She made her senior debut in 2020 against Colo-Colo and the next year, she was loaned out to Everton de Viña del Mar. Back to Universidad de Chile in 2022, she got regularity during 2023 and signed her first professional contract on 5 January 2024, on a deal for two years.

== International career ==
Morales represented the Chile national under-17 team in friendly tournaments. Later, she represented the under-20's in the 2022 South American Championship.

At senior level, Morales was called up to training microcycles from 2021 to 2023. She received her first official call-up for the 2025–26 CONMEBOL Liga de Naciones matches against Venezuela and Bolivia on 24 and 28 October 2025 and made her debut in the second match by replacing Catalina Figueroa at the minute 55.
