= Llanka Groff =

Chilean footballer

Personal information
- Full name: Llanka Montserrat Groff Díaz
- Date of birth: 5 November 2002 (age 24)
- Place of birth: La Serena, Chile
- Height: 1.61 m (5 ft 3 in)
- Position: Midfielder

Team information
- Current team: Universidad de Chile
- Number: 10

Youth career
- Deportes La Serena

Senior career*
Years	Team	Apps	(Gls)
2015–2018	Deportes La Serena		
2019–	Universidad de Chile	100	(9)

International career^{‡}
2022	Chile U20	4	(0)
2024–	Chile	2	(0)
- * Club domestic league appearances and goals as of 12 February 2024 ‡ National team caps and goals as of 13 March 2024

Llanka Montserrat Groff Díaz (born 5 November 2002) is a Chilean footballer who plays as a midfielder for Universidad de Chile in the Chilean Primera División and the Chile women's national team.

== Club career ==
Born in La Serena, Chile, Groff began her career with the women's team of Deportes La Serena. At the age of twelve, she became the youngest player in the national under-17 championship at the same time she played for the senior team.

In 2019, she joined Universidad de Chile, winning the league title in 2021. In December 2023, she renewed her contract for two seasons. Wearing the number 6 until the 2023 season, she changed it for the number 10 since the 2024 season.

== International career ==
Groff represented Chile at under-20 level in the 2022 South American Championship.

She was included in the Chile under-20 squad for the 2022 South American Games, however her club, Universidad de Chile, did not give her in.

At senior level, she received her first call up for the matches against Jamaica on 23 and 27 February 2024 and made her debut in the first match, a 5–1 win. She also entered in the second match, a 1–0 win.

== Personal life ==
She studies engineering in information systems and management control at the University of Chile.
