= Denisse Orellana =

Chilean footballer (born 1996)

Personal information
- Full name: Denisse Alejandra Orellana Betancourt
- Date of birth: 8 November 1996 (age 29)
- Position: Defender

Youth career
- Universidad de Chile

Senior career*
| Years | Team | Apps | (Gls) |
| 2008–2025 | Universidad de Chile | | |

International career^{‡}
| 2017 | Chile | 1 | (0) |
- * Club domestic league appearances and goals ‡ National team caps and goals as of 15 September 2017

Denisse Alejandra Orellana Betancourt (born 8 November 1996) is a Chilean footballer who plays as a defender.

== Club career ==
Orellana spent 17 seasons with Universidad de Chile from 2008 to 2025 and made over 200 appearances in official matches.

== International career ==
Orellana made her senior debut for Chile on 15 September 2017.
