= Anaís Cifuentes =

Chilean footballer

Personal information
- Full name: Anaís Almendra Cifuentes San Juan
- Date of birth: 1 January 2005 (age 21)
- Place of birth: Santiago, Chile
- Height: 1.65 m (5 ft 5 in)
- Position: Right-back

Team information
- Current team: Colo-Colo
- Number: 15

Youth career
- Colo-Colo

Senior career*
Years	Team	Apps	(Gls)
2021–	Colo-Colo		

International career^{‡}
2022	Chile U17	12	(2)
2023–	Chile	1	(1)
- * Club domestic league appearances and goals ‡ National team caps and goals as of 8 February 2024

Anaís Almendra Cifuentes San Juan (born 1 January 2005) is a Chilean footballer who plays as a right-back for Colo-Colo and the Chile women's national team.

== Club career ==
A product of the Colo-Colo youth system, she made her debut for the first team in the 2021 season.

She has been nominated as Revelation Player and Best Full-back in the Premios FutFem 2021 and 2022, respectively, the awards about the Chilean women's football, reaching the second place in the voting.

At the end of the 2023 season, she announced that she was leaving Colo-Colo to move abroad, but she finally renewed with them for two years.

== International career ==
In 2022, she represented Chile at under-17 level in both the South American Championship and the World Cup. At the World Cup, she scored a goal in the first match against New Zealand, a 3–1 win.

At senior level, she made her debut scoring a goal in a 6–0 win against Peru on 5 December 2023 in Santiago, Chile.

== Personal life ==
She is nicknamed Chimbi.

== Honours ==
Colo-Colo

- Primera División (5): 2022, 2023, 2024, 2025, 2026
