= Javiera Soto =

Chilean footballer

Personal information
- Full name: Javiera Isidora Soto Arriagada
- Date of birth: 23 January 2005 (age 21)
- Place of birth: Chile
- Height: 1.65 m (5 ft 5 in)
- Position: Defender

Team information
- Current team: Magallanes
- Number: 3

Youth career
- 2013–2022: Universidad Católica

Senior career*
Years	Team	Apps	(Gls)
2022–2024	Universidad Católica		
2025	Deportes Recoleta	12	(0)
2026–	Magallanes	17	(1)

International career^{‡}
2026–	Chile	1	(0)
- * Club domestic league appearances and goals as of 15 October 2026 ‡ National team caps and goals as of 15 October 2026

Javiera Isidora Soto Arriagada (born 23 January 2005) is a Chilean footballer who plays as a defender for Magallanes and the Chile women's national team.

== Club career ==
Soto joined the Universidad Católica youth ranks at the age of 7. She made her senior debut in November 2022 and was promoted to the first team the next season.

In 2025, Soto joined Deportes Recoleta. The next year, she switched to Magallanes.

== International career ==
In August 2021, Soto was called up to a training microcycle of Chile at under-17 level.

Soto received her first call-up to the Chile national team for the friendly matches against Bolivia in October 2026, making her debut in the 7–0 win on 11 October.
