= Melany Letelier =

Chilean footballer

Personal information
- Full name: Melany Janett Letelier Toledo
- Date of birth: 28 November 2000 (age 25)
- Place of birth: Antofagasta, Chile
- Height: 1.56 m (5 ft 1 in)
- Position: Attacking midfielder

Team information
- Current team: Palestino
- Number: 18

Youth career
- Deportivo Ormazábal
- Deportivo Liceo
- Santiago Amengual
- Deportes Antofagasta

College career
Years	Team	Apps	(Gls)
2022	Universidad de Antofagasta (futsal)		

Senior career*
Years	Team	Apps	(Gls)
2014–2023	Deportes Antofagasta	17+	(5+)
2024	Palestino	23	(3)
2025	Millonarios	5	(0)
2025	Deportes Iquique	9	(1)
2026–	Palestino	23	(4)

International career^{‡}
2018	Chile U20		
2026–	Chile	1	(0)
- * Club domestic league appearances and goals as of 14 October 2026 ‡ National team caps and goals as of 14 October 2026

Melany Janett Letelier Toledo (born 28 November 2000) is a Chilean footballer who plays as an attacking midfielder for Palestino and the Chile national team.

== Club career ==
Born in Antofagasta, Chile, Letelier was with local clubs Deportivo Ormazábal, Deportivo Liceo and Santiago Amengual before joining Deportes Antofagasta. At the same time she played for them, she represented the Universidad de Antofagasta futsal team in a national championship in 2022.

In January 2024, Letelier signed with Palestino. The next year, she moved abroad and signed with Colombian Football League side Millonarios.

Back to Chile, Letelier joined Deportes Iquique for the second half of 2025. She rejoined Palestino for the 2026 season.

== International career ==
Letelier represented Chile U20 in the 2018 South American Championship.

At senior level, Letelier received her first call-up for the friendly matches against Bolivia in October 2026, making her debut in the 7–0 win on 11 October.

== Personal life ==
At the age of 9, Letelier was the central figure of a chapter of Chilean docu-reality ¿Con Qué Sueñas? (What Do You Dream About?) from CNTV Infantil.

While playing for Deportes Antofagasta, Letelier studied Occupational therapy at the University of Antofagasta.
