= Ignacia Bustos =

Chilean footballer (born 2004)

Personal information
- Full name: Ignacia Agustina Bustos Reyes
- Date of birth: 13 August 2004 (age 22)
- Place of birth: Chile
- Height: 1.73 m (5 ft 8 in)
- Position: Goalkeeper

Team information
- Current team: Universidad Católica
- Number: 13

Youth career
- 2018–2021: Universidad de Concepción

Senior career*
Years	Team	Apps	(Gls)
2021	Universidad de Concepción	8	(0)
2022	Fernández Vial		
2023–	Universidad Católica	15+	(0)

International career^{‡}
2022–2024	Chile U20	4	(0)
2023	Chile U19	4	(0)
2026–	Chile	1	(0)
- * Club domestic league appearances and goals as of 14 October 2026 ‡ National team caps and goals as of 14 October 2026

Ignacia Agustina Bustos Reyes (born 13 August 2004) is a Chilean footballer who plays as a goalkeeper for Universidad Católica and the Chile national team.

== Club career ==
Bustos started her career with Universidad de Concepción, making her senior debut in 1–2 away victory against Deportes Iquique on 3 July 2021, aged 16. In 2022, she switched to Fernández Vial.

In January 2023, Bustos signed with Universidad Católica.

== International career ==
Bustos represented Chile at under-20 level in both the 2022 and the 2024 South American Championship. In 2023, she represented the under 19's in the Liga Evolución.

At senior level, Bustos received her first call-up to the Chile squad for the friendly matches against Peru in December 2023. Almost three years later, she was included in the squad for the friendlies against Bolivia in October 2026, making her debut in the 7–0 win on 11 October.
