= María Paz Bogado =

Paraguayan footballer

Personal information
- Full name: María Paz Bogado Villalba
- Date of birth: 15 April 2001 (age 25)
- Place of birth: Capiatá, Paraguay
- Height: 1.65 m (5 ft 5 in)
- Position: Left-back

Team information
- Current team: Universidad Católica

Senior career*
Years	Team	Apps	(Gls)
2017–2021	Deportivo Capiatá		
2022	Fernández Vial		
2023–2025	Coquimbo Unido	51+	(9+)
2026–	Universidad Católica		

International career
2018	Paraguay U17		
2019	Paraguay U19		
2020	Paraguay U20		
- * Club domestic league appearances and goals

María Paz Bogado Villalba (born 15 April 2001) is a Paraguayan footballer who plays as a left-back for Chilean club Universidad Católica.

== Club career ==
Born in Capiatá, Paraguay, Bogado started her career with local club Deportivo Capiatá and took part in the Copa Libertadores in 2017 and 2021.

In 2021, Bogado moved to Chile to join Fernández Vial. However, she signed with them in January 2022 due to COVID-19 pandemic health emergency.

In March 2023, Bogado joined Coquimbo Unido for two seasons and renewed for the 2025 season. She left them after reaching the Campeonato Nacional Fútbol Femenino semifinals three consecutive times. In the 2025 season, she also was selected the best left-back by ANFP and TNT Sports Chile.

In December 2025, Bogado joined Universidad Católica.

== International career ==
Bogado represented Paraguay at under-17 level in the 2018 South American Championship, the under-19's, and the under-20's in the 2020 South American Championship.

She also was pre-selected to the Paraguay senior team.

== Honours ==
Deportivo Capiatá

- Paraguayan Primera División: 2017 Clausura

Individual

- Chilean Primera División Ideal Team: 2025
