= Catalina Figueroa =

Chilean footballer

Personal information
- Full name: Catalina Figueroa Fernández
- Date of birth: 28 January 2005 (age 21)
- Place of birth: Santiago, Chile
- Height: 1.67 m (5 ft 6 in)
- Position: Defender

Team information
- Current team: Universidad de Chile

Youth career
- Universidad Católica

Senior career*
Years	Team	Apps	(Gls)
2020–2025	Universidad Católica		
2025	Fundación Albacete	2	(0)
2026–	Universidad de Chile	0	(0)

International career^{‡}
2022	Chile U17	10	(1)
2022	Chile U20	3	(0)
2022–	Chile	2	(0)
- * Club domestic league appearances and goals as of 5 January 2026 ‡ National team caps and goals as of 24 January 2024

Catalina Figueroa Fernández (born 28 January 2005) is a Chilean footballer who plays as a defender for Universidad de Chile.

== Club career ==
A product of the women's team of Universidad Católica, Figueroa officially joined the first team in the 2021 season. She and her teammate Millaray Cortés were the first players to sign a professional contract with the club on 1 February 2022. She became the team captain.

On 23 July 2025, it was announced her signing with Fundación Albacete in the Primera Federación on a deal until 2026.

Back to Chile, Figueroa joined Universidad de Chile in February 2026.

== International career ==
In 2022, Figueroa represented Chile U17 in both the South American Championship and the FIFA World Cup, becoming the team captain. She also represented the under-20's in the South American Championship and friendlies against Costa Rica.

At senior level, she received her first call-up in February 2022 for the friendly against Ecuador. The next year, she made her debut in a 0–4 loss against Argentina on 17 February 2023. She made a second appearance in a 0–4 loss against Brazil on 2 July of the same year.
