= Adriana Moreno =

Chilean footballer

Personal information
- Full name: Adriana Isabel del Carmen Moreno Martínez
- Date of birth: 6 December 2000 (age 25)
- Place of birth: San Felipe, Chile
- Height: 1.63 m (5 ft 4 in)
- Position: Forward

Team information
- Current team: Coquimbo Unido
- Number: 10

Youth career
- Liceo Mixto

Senior career*
| Years | Team | Apps | (Gls) |
| 2020–2021 | Everton | | |
| 2022 | Santiago Morning | | |
| 2023 | Unión Española | 21 | (27) |
| 2024– | Coquimbo Unido | 24 | (21+) |

International career^{‡}
| 2026– | Chile | 5 | (5) |
- * Club domestic league appearances and goals ‡ National team caps and goals as of 11 October 2026

Adriana Isabel del Carmen Moreno Martínez (born 6 December 2000) is a Chilean footballer who plays as a forward for Coquimbo Unido.

== Club career ==
Born in San Felipe, Chile, Moreno represented her school, Liceo Mixto, in handball, basketball and football. At club level, she started her career with Everton in 2020.

The next two seasons, she played for Santiago Morning, taking part in the 2022 Copa Libertadores, and Unión Española. With Unión Española, she got promotion to the Chilean top level scoring 27 goals.

In 2024, Moreno signed with Coquimbo Unido. After scoring 21 goals during the 2025 season, the third goalscorer of the Chilean championship, she renewed for the next season.

== International career ==
Moreno received her first call-up to the Chile national team for the friendly match against the United States on 27 January 2026. She was called up again for the friendly matches against Paraguay on 4 and 7 March 2026. She made her debut in the first match and scored the winning goal in the second match.

== International goals ==
| No. | Date | Venue | Opponent | Score | Result | Competition |
|---|---|---|---|---|---|---|
| 1. | 7 March 2026 | CARFEM, Ypané, Paraguay | Paraguay | 1–0 | 1–0 | Friendly |
| 2. | 11 October 2026 | Estadio Bicentenario de La Florida, Santiago, Chile | Bolivia | 2–0 | 7–0 | Friendly |
| 3. | 11 October 2026 | Estadio Bicentenario de La Florida, Santiago, Chile | Bolivia | 3–0 | 7–0 | Friendly |
| 4. | 11 October 2026 | Estadio Bicentenario de La Florida, Santiago, Chile | Bolivia | 4–0 | 7–0 | Friendly |
| 5. | 11 October 2026 | Estadio Bicentenario de La Florida, Santiago, Chile | Bolivia | 6–0 | 7–0 | Friendly |

== Personal life ==
Her father, Marco Antonio Moreno, is a former footballer for Unión San Felipe.

== Honours ==
Individual

- Primera División de Chile Top goalscorer: 2026
