= Camila Arriagada =

Chilean footballer

Personal information
- Full name: Camila Fernanda Arriagada Arraños
- Date of birth: 1 September 2002 (age 24)
- Place of birth: Santiago, Chile
- Height: 1.58 m (5 ft 2 in)
- Position: Forward

Team information
- Current team: Magallanes
- Number: 14

Youth career
- 2014–2016: Universidad Católica

Senior career*
Years	Team	Apps	(Gls)
2016–2023	Universidad Católica	12+	(2+)
2024–2025	Audax Italiano	7+	(4+)
2026–	Magallanes	17	(7)

International career^{‡}
2016	Chile U17		
2026–	Chile	1	(0)
- * Club domestic league appearances and goals as of 15 October 2026 ‡ National team caps and goals as of 15 October 2026

Camila Fernanda Arriagada Arraños (born 1 September 2002) is a Chilean footballer who plays as a forward for Magallanes and the Chile women's national team.

== Club career ==
As a youth player, Arriagada represented the Santiago's team in the Copa ENEL, a Chilean traditional five-a-side football championship.

At club level, Ariagada joined the women's team of Universidad Católica at the age of 12. She left them at the end of the 2023 season.

In January 2024, Arriagada signed with Audax Italiano. Two years later, she switched to Magallanes.

== International career ==
Arriagada represented the Chile at under-17 level during 2016, with views to the 2018 South American Championship.

Arriagada received her first call-up to the Chile national team for the friendly matches against Bolivia in October 2026, making her debut in the 7–0 win on 11 October.
