= Yordana Martínez =

Chilean footballer

Personal information
- Full name: Yordana Karina Martínez Cifuentes
- Date of birth: 28 July 2004 (age 22)
- Place of birth: Temuco, Chile
- Height: 1.60 m (5 ft 3 in)
- Position: Right winger

Team information
- Current team: Coquimbo Unido
- Number: 7

Youth career
- Magallanes Temuco
- Unión Araucanía

Senior career*
Years	Team	Apps	(Gls)
2022	Magallanes Temuco		
2023	Unión Araucanía		
2023–2024	Defensores de Belgrano		
2024	Universidad de Concepción		
2025	Everton	22	(1)
2026–	Coquimbo Unido	24	(3)

International career^{‡}
2019	Chile U17		
- Chile U19
2021	Chile (futsal)		
2026–	Chile	1	(0)
- * Club domestic league appearances and goals as of 12 October 2026 ‡ National team caps and goals as of 12 October 2026

Yordana Karina Martínez Cifuentes (born 28 July 2004) is a Chilean footballer who plays as a right winger for Coquimbo Unido.

== Club career ==
Born in Temuco, Chile, Martínez was trained at Magallanes de Temuco and Unión Araucanía. After standing out with them in 2022 and 2023, respectively, she moved abroad and signed with Argentine club Defensores de Belgrano in August 2023.

Back to her homeland, Martínez joined Universidad de Concepción in July 2024. The next year, she switched to Everton de Viña del Mar.

In December 2025, Martínez signed with Coquimbo Unido.

== International career ==
Martínez represented Chile at under-17 and under-19 level in addition to the senior futsal team in 2021.

Martínez received her first call-up to the Chile senior team for the friendly matches against Bolivia in October 2026. She made her debut in the first match on 11 October.
