= Milenka Pavez =

Chilean footballer

Personal information
- Full name: Milenka Anaís Pavez Osorio
- Date of birth: 11 February 2002 (age 24)
- Place of birth: Chile
- Height: 1.70 m (5 ft 7 in)
- Position: Left-back

Team information
- Current team: Unión Española
- Number: 4

Youth career
- Everton

Senior career*
Years	Team	Apps	(Gls)
2017–2025	Everton	65+	(5+)
2026–	Unión Española	24	(1)

International career^{‡}
2022	Chile U20	4	(0)
2026–	Chile	1	(1)
- * Club domestic league appearances and goals as of 15 October 2026 ‡ National team caps and goals as of 15 October 2026

Milenka Anaís Pavez Osorio (born 11 February 2002) is a Chilean footballer who plays as a left-back for Unión Española and the Chile national team.

== Club career ==
A product of Everton de Viña del Mar, Pavez signed her first professional contract in 2023 and won the Primera B in the same year.

Pavez left Everton at the end of the 2025 season and switched to Unión Española.

== International career ==
Pavez represented the Chile at under-20 level in the 2022 South American Championship.

At senior level, Pavez received her first call-up to the Chile squad for the friendly matches against Bolivia in October 2026, making her debut with a goal in the 7–0 win on 11 October.

== Honours ==
Everton

- Primera B: 2023
