= Millaray Cortés =

Chilean footballer (born 2004)

Personal information
- Full name: Millaray Scarleth Cortés Espinoza
- Date of birth: 30 June 2004 (age 22)
- Place of birth: Santiago, Chile
- Position: Midfielder

Team information
- Current team: Fiorentina

Youth career
- Quinta Normal (city team)
- 2018: Lo Prado (city team)
- 2018–2021: Universidad Católica

Senior career*
Years	Team	Apps	(Gls)
2022–2024	Universidad Católica	65	(12)
2024–2026	Sevilla	44	(4)
2026–	Fiorentina	0	(0)

International career^{‡}
2022	Chile U20	3	(0)
2022–	Chile	4	(2)
- * Club domestic league appearances and goals as of 11 September 2026 ‡ National team caps and goals as of 3 February 2024

Millaray Scarleth Cortés Espinoza (born 30 June 2004) is a Chilean professional footballer who plays as a midfielder for Serie A club Fiorentina and the Chile national team.

== Club career ==
Cortés began to play football at early age in Renca, Santiago de Chile. After being discovered by the coach Silvana Zúñiga, she represented the teams of Quinta Normal and Lo Prado in the Copa Enel in 2017 and 2018, respectively.

Cortés came to the women's team of Universidad Católica at the age of fourteen. On 2 February 2022, she signed her first professional contract alongside her teammate Catalina Figueroa, the two first in the club history. On 1 August 2023, she renewed with them for a season.

In the 2023 season, she made up a successful attacking pair along with Agustina Heyermann, becoming nominated for the Premios FutFem, the women's football awards in Chile, in the categories Best Midfielder and Best Goal for a goal against Universidad de Chile on 3 June, winning the second award.

In the second half of 2024, Cortés moved to Spain and joined Sevilla.

In September 2026, Cortés moved to Italy and signed with Serie A club Fiorentina.

== International career ==
At under-20 level, Cortés represented Chile in the 2022 South American Championship.

She made her senior debut in a 1–1 draw against Philippines on 12 November 2022 by replacing Yessenia López at the minute 85. In her fourth match, she scored her first two goals in the 6–0 win against Peru on 5 December 2023.

== Honours ==
Individual

- Premios FutFem - Best Goal: 2023
