= C.D. Arturo Fernández Vial (women) =

Association football club

Fernández Vial
- Full name: Club Deportivo Corporación; Arturo Fernández Vial
- Nicknames: La maquina aurinegra Vialinas; Aurinegras
- Founded: 2009; 17 years ago
- Ground: Estadio Municipal de Concepción; Concepción, Chile
- Capacity: 30,448
- Chairman: Ángelo Castiglione
- Manager: Antonio Zaracho
- League: Campeonato Nacional Fútbol Femenino
Home colours	Away colours

Club Deportivo Corporación Arturo Fernández Vial Femenino is a football club in Chile, from the Concepción area, in the Bio-Bio Region. It represents Fernandez Vial in Chile Women's Championship.

== Uniform ==
- Home Uniform: Yellow Jersey with vertical black stripes, black shorts, black socks.
- Away Uniform: Black Jersey, black shorts, black socks.

== Stadium ==
Estadio Municipal de Concepción Alcaldesa Ester Roa, located in Concepción, Chile.

=== Current squad ===
As of Apr 2022 Note: Flags indicate national team as defined under FIFA eligibility rules; some limited exceptions apply. Players may hold more than one non-FIFA nationality.

No.	Pos.	Nation	Player
1	GK	CHI	Ignacia Bustos
2	DF	PAR	María Paz Bogado
3	DF	CHI	Ninoska Lecaros
4	DF	CHI	Norma Castilla
5	MF	CHI	Elisa Perez
6	MF	CHI	Pia Fehrmann
7	FW	CHI	Franchesca Caniguan
8	MF	CHI	Nicole Chavez
9	FW	CHI	Marinka Huircan
10	MF	CHI	Camila Guzman
11	DF	CHI	Catherine Monsalvez

No.	Pos.	Nation	Player
12	GK	CHI	Macarena Vergara
13	DF	CHI	Camille Iluffi
14	DF	CHI	Javiera Salvo
16	FW	CHI	Constanza Reveco
17	FW	CHI	Carla Marquez
19	DF	VEN	Barbara Koster
20	MF	CHI	Martina Oses
22	MF	CHI	Krystell Muñoz
24	MF	CHI	Maira Vidal
28	FW	CHI	Viviana Torres
30	GK	CHI	Javiera Diaz
