= Cris (footballer, born 2002) =

Brazilian footballer (born 1992)

Personal information
- Full name: Miriam Cristina Cavalcante
- Date of birth: 14 January 2002 (age 24)
- Height: 1.65 m (5 ft 5 in)
- Position: Midfielder

Team information
- Current team: Flamengo
- Number: 8

Senior career*
Years	Team	Apps	(Gls)
2020–2021	São Paulo	19	(1)
2022–	Flamengo	34	(1)

International career^{‡}
2018	Brazil U17	3	(0)
2019–	Brazil U20	14	(3)
Medal record
Representing Brazil
South American U-20 Women's Championship
Winner	2022 Chile
- * Club domestic league appearances and goals as of 14:27, 3 August 2023 (UTC) ‡ National team caps and goals as of 14:27, 3 August 2023 (UTC)

Miriam Cristina Cavalcante (born 14 January 2002), better known as Cris, is a Brazilian footballer who plays professionally as a midfielder for the Flamengo women's association football team in Brazil. She has represented Brazil internationally, including playing at the 2022 FIFA U-20 Women's World Cup, held in Costa Rica, where she scored her team's only goal in the semi-finals game when they lost 2–1 to Japan. This was her only goal in that World Cup. She also had one assist in six games played. She also participated at the 2018 FIFA U-17 Women's World Cup, where she did not register a goal or assist in three games where she participated at.
