= Sofia Coulombe =

Chilean footballer (born 2005)

Sofía Coulombe
Personal information
- Full name: Sofía Coulombe Montenegro
- Date of birth: 22 July 2005 (age 21)
- Place of birth: Barcelona, Spain
- Height: 1.57 m (5 ft 2 in)
- Position: Forward

Team information
- Current team: Espanyol B
- Number: 22

Youth career
- Colegio La Miranda
- Sant Gabriel

College career
Years	Team	Apps	(Gls)
2023–2025	Colorado State Rams	34	(4)

Senior career*
Years	Team	Apps	(Gls)
2022–2023	Sant Gabriel		
2026	Ona Sant Adrià		
2026–	Espanyol B		

International career^{‡}
2026–	Chile	1	(0)
- * Club domestic league appearances and goals as of 8 June 2026 ‡ National team caps and goals as of 8 JUne 2025

Sofía Coulombe Montenegro (born 22 July 2005) is a professional footballer who plays as a forward for Espanyol B. Born in Spain, she plays for the Chile national team.

== Club career ==
Born in Barcelona, Spain, Coulombe played for the Colegio La Miranda football team as a student, helping them to win a league title. As a footballer, she was trained at CE Sant Gabriel and played for them in 2022–23. In 2023, she emigrated to the United States and spent three seasons with Colorado State Rams until 2025.

Back to Spain, Coulombe joined Ona Sant Adrià, an affiliate team to Badalona and shortly after she switched to Espanyol B.

== International career ==
In May 2026, Coulombe was called up to a training microcycle of the Chile national team under Luis Mena. Following she was included in the final squad and made her debut in the 2025–26 Liga de Naciones match against Ecuador on 5 June 2026.

== Personal life ==
Coulombe was born in Barcelona, Spain, to an American father and a Chilean mother called Mariana Montenegro. She also holds American citizenship.

Couloumbe is the sister of the footballer Thomas Dean Coulombe, who has played for the Chile under-20 national team.
