= Agustina Heyermann =

Chilean footballer (born 2004)

Personal information
- Full name: Agustina Verónica Heyermann Grossi
- Date of birth: 3 August 2004 (age 22)
- Place of birth: Antofagasta, Chile
- Position: Forward

Team information
- Current team: Universidad Católica
- Number: 7

Youth career
- 2016–2022: Universidad Católica

Senior career*
Years	Team	Apps	(Gls)
2022–	Universidad Católica		(20)

International career^{‡}
2022–2023	Chile U20	3	(0)
2023–	Chile	2	(0)
- * Club domestic league appearances and goals as of 30 January 2024 ‡ National team caps and goals as of 30 January 2024

Agustina Verónica Heyermann Grossi (born 3 August 2004) is a Chilean footballer who plays as a forward for Universidad Católica and the Chile women's national team.

== Club career ==
Heyermann came to the women's team of Universidad Católica in 2016, aged 11, and was promoted to the under-17 team at the age of twelve. She made her senior debut in 2022, becoming the team goalscorer with seven goals. In January 2023, she signed her first professional contract.

In 2023, she made up a successful attacking pair along with her teammate Millaray Cortés, scored thirteen goals and renewed her contract until the end of 2025.

== International career ==
At under-20 level, Heyermann represented Chile in the 2022 South American Games. In September 2023, Heyermann also represented the under-19 team in a friendly against Peru U19.

She made her senior debut in a 1–0 win against Peru on 1 December 2023 by replacing Yenny Acuña at the minute 77. Subsequently, she made a second appearance in the 6–0 win against the same opponent on 5 December of the same year.

== Personal life ==
She is nicknamed Androide (Android).

She also has played tennis, basketball and equestrianism.
