= Bruninha =

Brazilian footballer (born 2002)

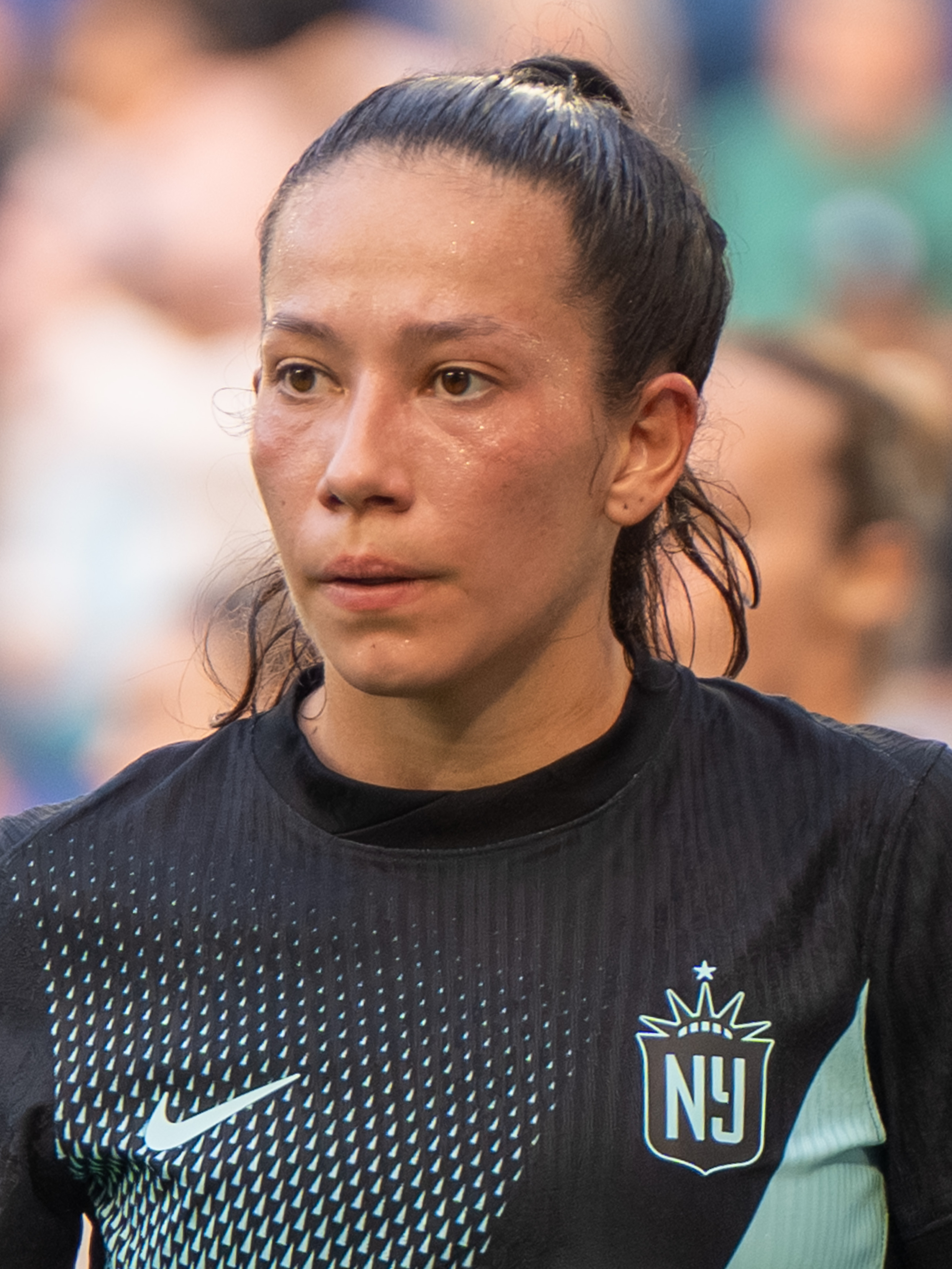
- Bruninha with Gotham FC in 2025

Personal information
- Full name: Bruna Santos Nhaia
- Date of birth: 16 June 2002 (age 24)
- Place of birth: Castro, Paraná, Brazil
- Height: 1.57 m (5 ft 2 in)
- Position: Right back

Team information
- Current team: Gotham FC
- Number: 3

Youth career
- 2016–2019: Chapecoense
- 2019: Internacional

Senior career*
Years	Team	Apps	(Gls)
2018	Chapecoense		
2020	Internacional	6	(1)
2021–2022	Santos	24	(1)
2022–	Gotham FC	76	(2)

International career^{‡}
2018	Brazil U17	3	(0)
2019–	Brazil U20	15	(1)
2021–	Brazil	19	(1)
- * Club domestic league appearances and goals as of 1 November 2026 ‡ National team caps and goals as of 17 October 2023

Bruna Santos Nhaia (born 16 June 2002), known as Bruninha or just Bruna, is a Brazilian professional footballer who plays as a right back for Gotham FC of the National Women's Soccer League (NWSL) and the Brazil national team.

She previously played for Brazilian sides Chapecoense, Internacional, and Santos FC. She captained the Brazilian team at the 2022 U-20 World Cup and participated in the 2023 World Cup.

Known for her strong play on both sides of the ball, she won the 2023 and 2025 NWSL Championships with Gotham is the youngest goal scorer in NWSL competition in the history of the club.

== Club career ==
=== Youth career and Beginnings in Brazil ===
Born in Castro, Paraná, Bruninha joined Chapecoense's youth setup after a trial period in 2016. She made her first team debut for the club in 2018, but went back to playing at the under-18 level following a 2019 move to Internacional.

Bruninha began featuring in Internacional's first team during the 2020 campaign, scoring a goal on her debut in a 3–0 away win against Vitória on 5 September. In February 2021, she moved to Santos FC. She appeared in 24 matches for the club and won the 2021 Bola de Prata (Silver Ball) for her play.

=== Gotham FC, 2022–present ===
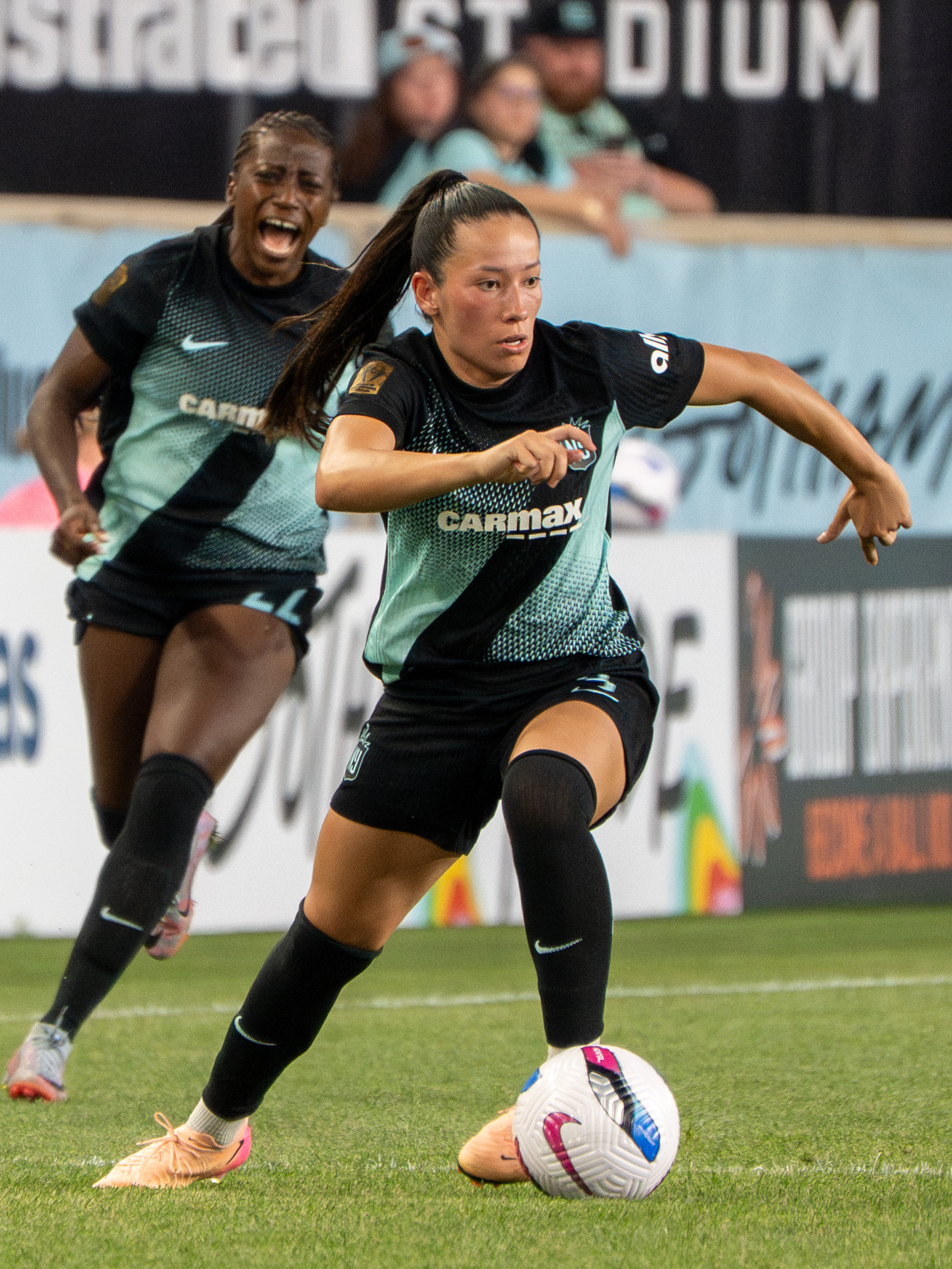
Bruninha with Gotham FC in 2025

On 23 August 2022, Santos transferred Bruninha to NJ/NY Gotham FC of the National Women's Soccer League for an undisclosed fee. She made one appearance in 2022 and 17 league appearances during the 2023 season, in which Gotham placed sixth. She scored her first NWSL goal on 21 May 2023, becoming the youngest goal scorer in club history at 20 years of age. During the month of May she was named Player of the Week for Week 9 and appeared on the Team of the Month for her strong defensive and attacking play.

She played in every minute of Gotham's postseason run, scoring a crucial assist in the quarter final match against the North Carolina Courage and playing in a defense that allowed one goal in three games. Gotham FC lifted the NWSL Championship trophy on 11 November 2023. She is currently under contract through the 2027 season. In November 2025, she performed a stepover assist to Rose Lavelle, who scored the lone goal in a win against Washington Spirit in the 2025 NWSL Championship final.

== International career ==
Bruninha has made appearances for Brazil at the under-17, under-20, and senior levels. In 2022 she won the South American U-20 Championship and captained her team at the FIFA U-20 Women's World Cup, in which Brazil finished in third, playing in every match.

She made her first appearance for the full women's national team on 17 September 2021, in a 3–1 win against Argentina, notching one assist. In 2023 she appeared in the SheBelieves Cup and made her first World Cup appearance in a 4–0 group stage win over Panama.

== Style of play ==
Bruninha is a right-footed defender who typically plays on the right side of a back four as a right back, though she occasionally plays on the opposite side of the field. Upon re-signing Bruninha in 2023, NJ/NY Gotham FC head coach Juan Carlos Amorós described her as having "great skill on the ball, and she is strong in 1v1 defending. She can read the game well, and has the ability to be a dangerous part of our attack."

== Career statistics ==
=== International ===
As of 17 October 2023

Brazil
Year	Apps	Goals
2021	5	0
2022	1	0
2023	3	0
Total	9	0

=== Club ===
As of February 15, 2025

Club	Season	League			Domestic Cup		Continental		Total	
Club	Season	Division	Apps	Goals	Apps	Goals	Apps	Goals	Apps	Goals
SC Internacional	2020	Brasileiro Feminino	6	1	—		—		6	1
Santos	2021	Brasileiro Feminino	16	1	1	0	—		17	1
Santos	2022	Brasileiro Feminino	8	0	—		—		8	0
Gotham FC	2022	NWSL	1	0	0	0	—		1	0
Gotham FC	2023	NWSL	20	2	2	0	—		22	2
Gotham FC	2024	NWSL	22	0	1	0	9	0	32	0
Gotham FC	2025	NWSL	0	0	0	0	0	0	0	0
Career total			73	4	4	0	9	0	86	4

== Honours ==
Gotham FC

- NWSL Championship: 2023, 2025
- NWSL Shield: 2026
- NWSL Challenge Cup: 2026
- CONCACAF W Champions Cup: 2024–25

Brazil U20

- South American Under-20 Women's Football Championship: 2022

Individual

- ESPN Bola de Prata: 2021
- NWSL Player of the Week: Week 9, 2023
- NWSL Team of the Month: May 2023
