= Valentina Díaz =

Chilean footballer (born 2001)

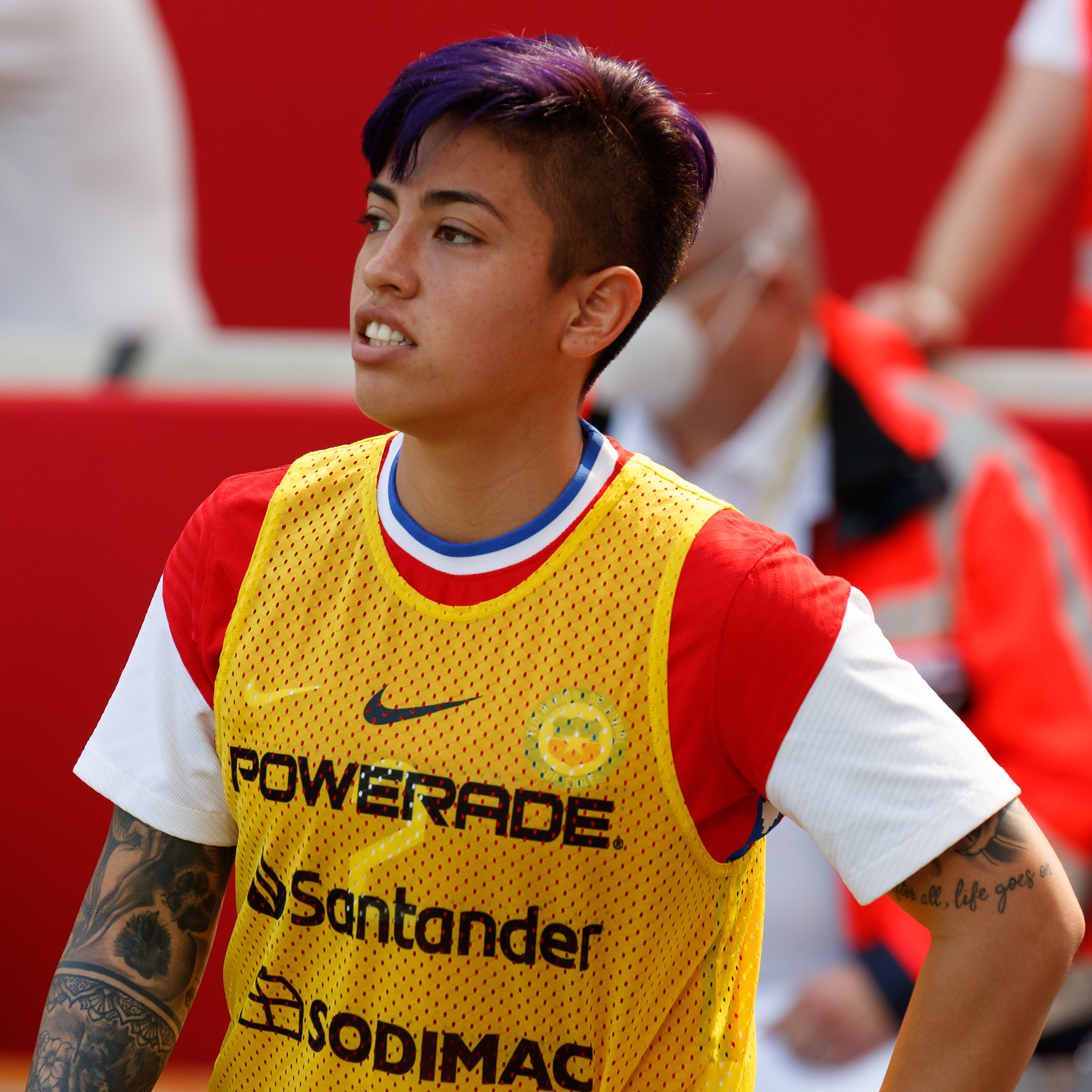

Personal information
- Full name: Valentina Fernanda Díaz Tapia
- Date of birth: 30 March 2001 (age 25)
- Place of birth: Santiago, Chile
- Height: 1.56 m (5 ft 1 in)
- Position: Defender

Team information
- Current team: Universidad de Chile
- Number: 22

Youth career
- 2016–2018: Colo-Colo

Senior career*
Years	Team	Apps	(Gls)
2018–2021	Colo-Colo		
2022–	Universidad de Chile		

International career^{‡}
2018	Chile U20		
2019–	Chile	2	(0)
- * Club domestic league appearances and goals ‡ National team caps and goals as of 3 March 2019

Valentina Fernanda Díaz Tapia (born 30 March 2001) is a Chilean footballer who plays as a defender for Universidad de Chile and the Chile women's national team.

== International career ==
At under-20 level, she was part of the Chile squad at the 2018 South American Games.

Díaz made her senior debut for Chile on 3 March 2019 in a 2–3 friendly loss against Jamaica.

== Statistics ==
COMPETITION	SEASON	FOOTBALL CLUB								
Friendly International Women	2019	Chile W	174	2	0	1	0	0	0	0

== Honours ==
Individual

- Primera División Ideal Team: 2024,
