= Nicolás Chahuán Nazar Municipal Stadium =

Stadium in La Calera, Chile

Nicolás Chahuán Stadium
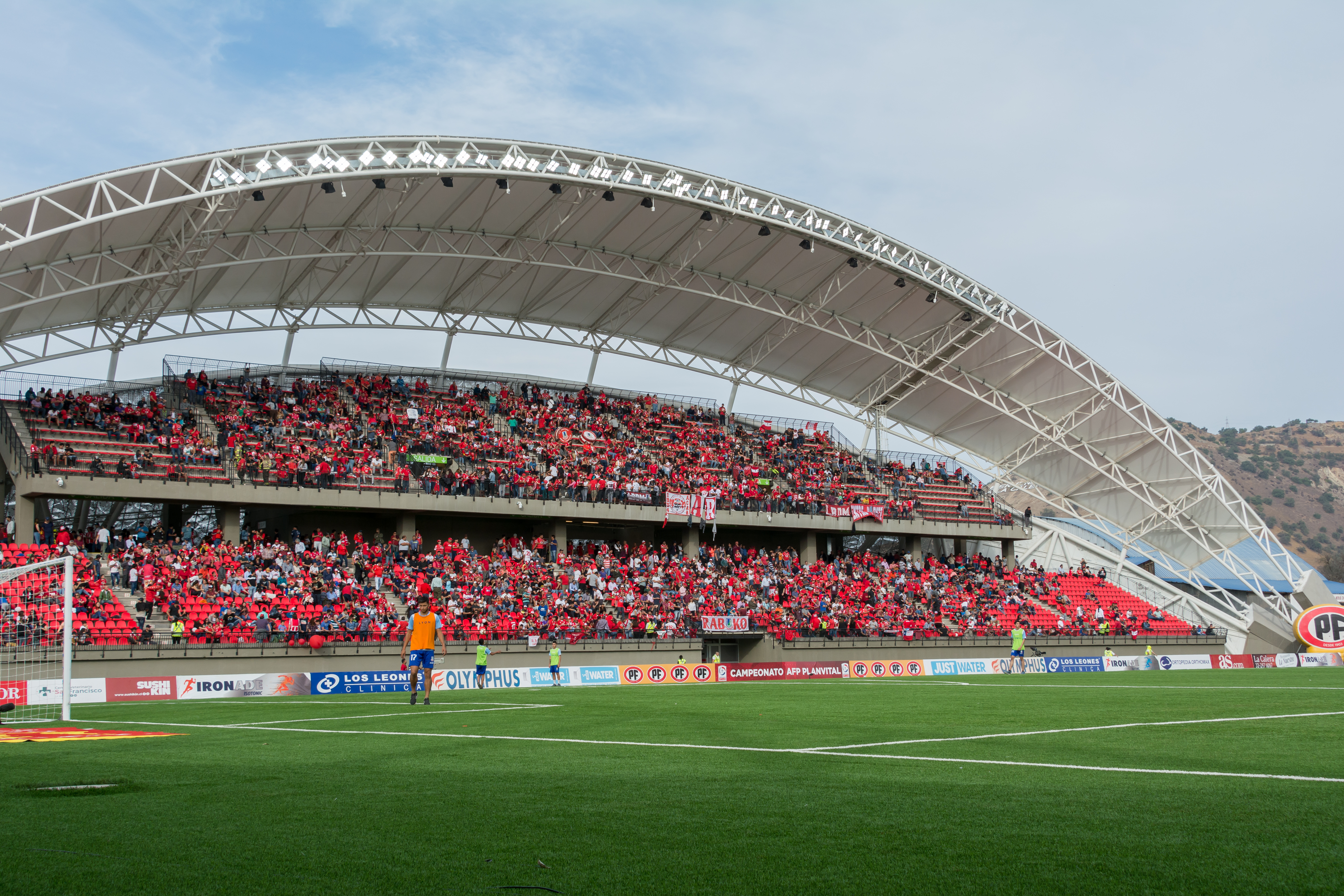
- Interactive map of Nicolás Chahuán Stadium
- Full name: Nicolás Chahuán Nazar Municipal Stadium
- Location: La Calera, Chile
- Coordinates: 32°47′03″S 71°11′58″W
- Owner: Municipality of La Calera
- Capacity: 8,353; 10,000 (international)
- Surface: Artificial turf
- Field size: 105 x 68 m

Construction
- Opened: 1950
- Renovated: 2019
- Demolished: 2017 (old stadium)
- Architect: Fernando Guarello
- Project manager: INDUSTRIALDRAFT

Tenant
- Unión La Calera

Nicolás Chahuán Nazar Municipal Stadium (Spanish: Estadio Municipal Nicolás Chahuán Nazar) is a multi-use stadium in La Calera, Valparaíso Region, Chile. It is currently used mostly for football matches, and is the home ground of Unión La Calera of the Chilean Primera División. The stadium was opened in 1950, but it was demolished and completely rebuilt in 2019, with a seating capacity of 9,200 spectators.
