= Karen Fuentes =

Chilean footballer (born 2004)

Personal information
- Full name: Karen Paola Fuentes Gómez
- Date of birth: 3 August 2004 (age 22)
- Place of birth: Puente Alto, Santiago, Chile
- Position: Midfielder

Team information
- Current team: Universidad de Chile
- Number: 13

Youth career
- 2017–2021: Universidad de Chile

Senior career*
Years	Team	Apps	(Gls)
2021–	Universidad de Chile		

International career^{‡}
2020–2022	Chile U20		
2023–	Chile	4	(0)
Medal record
Women's football
Representing Chile
Pan American Games
Silver medal – second place	2023 Santiago	Team
- * Club domestic league appearances and goals ‡ National team caps and goals as of 6 November 2023

Karen Paola Fuentes Gómez (born 3 August 2004) is a Chilean footballer who plays as a midfielder for Club Universidad de Chile and the Chile women's national team.

== Club career ==
Fuentes joined Universidad de Chile's sub 17 team in 2017. In 2021, she was promoted to senior team.

In 2023, she signed a professional contract with Universidad de Chile.

== International career ==
Fuentes has been a member of Chile women's U20 team. She has played in 2020 and 2022's CONMEBOL U20 tournament.

She made her senior debut for Chile women's national team in a friendly against Brazil on 2 July 2023.

She represented Chile at the 2023 Pan American Games, where Chile won the silver medal.

== Honours ==
Chile

- Pan American Games Silver Medal: 2023
