= Kelly Caicedo =

Colombian footballer (born 2002)

Personal information
- Full name: Kelly Johana Caicedo Alegría
- Date of birth: 26 November 2002 (age 23)
- Place of birth: Cali, Colombia
- Height: 1.72 m (5 ft 8 in)
- Position: Centre-back

Team information
- Current team: Pachuca
- Number: 1

Senior career*
Years	Team	Apps	(Gls)
2018–2019	América de Cali		
2020–2022	Deportivo Cali	23	(1)
2023	Cruzeiro	2	(0)
2023	Aliaza Lima		
2024–2025	Deportivo Cali		
2026–	Pachuca	17	(1)

International career^{‡}
2018	Colombia U17	4	(0)
2018	Colombia U18	1	(0)
2020–2022	Colombia U20	15	(1)
2019–	Colombia	3	(0)
- * Club domestic league appearances and goals as of 26 June 2023 ‡ National team caps and goals as of 20 August 2022

Kelly Johana Caicedo Alegría (born 26 November 2002) is a Colombian professional footballer who plays as a centre-back for Liga Femenil club Pachuca and the Colombia women's national team.

== Early life ==
Caicedo started playing football at the age of ten.

== Career ==
Caicedo started her career with Colombian side América de Cali, helping the club win the league.

== Personal life ==
Caicedo is the sister of Colombia international Linda Caicedo.
