= Club Universidad de Chile (women) =

Women's team of Chilean football club Universidad de Chile

Universidad de Chile
- Full name: Club Universidad de Chile
- Nickname: "Leonas" ("lioness")
- Founded: 2008
- Ground: Estadio Nacional Julio Martínez Prádanos, Santiago
- Capacity: 46,190
- Manager: Nilson Concha
- League: Campeonato Nacional Fútbol Femenino
- 2023: Semi-final
- Website: Official website
Home colours	Away colours	Third colours

Universidad de Chile Femenino is a Chilean women's football club from Santiago representing Club Universidad de Chile in the Campeonato Nacional Fútbol Femenino. It was founded in 2008.

Universidad de Chile has won the 2016 Apertura Championship.

The team made its debut on Copa Libertadores Femenina 2020 in Argentina in March 2021. Eventually it reached semi-final.

== Honours ==
=== Domestic ===
- Campeonato Nacional Fútbol Femenino:
  - Winners (2): 2016-A, 2021,

== Players ==
=== Current squad ===
As of Jan 2024 Note: Flags indicate national team as defined under FIFA eligibility rules; some limited exceptions apply. Players may hold more than one non-FIFA nationality.

No.	Pos.	Nation	Player
1	GK	CHI	Natalia Campos
2	DF	CHI	Constanza Santander
3	DF	CHI	Carla Guerrero
4	DF	CHI	Ignacia Durán
5	DF	CHI	Mariana Morales
6	MF	CHI	Gisela Pino
7	FW	PAR	Rebeca Fernández
8	DF	CHI	Denisse Orellana
9	FW	CHI	Franchesca Caniguán
10	MF	CHI	Llanka Groff
11	FW	CHI	Fernanda Araya
12	GK	ARG	Abigail Chaves
13	DF	CHI	Karen Fuentes
15	FW	CHI	Daniela Zamora
16	FW	CHI	Monserratt González
18	MF	VEN	Bárbara Sánchez
19	FW	CHI	Yessenia Huenteo

No.	Pos.	Nation	Player
20	FW	CHI	Natalia Cayupán
21	MF	CHI	Melissa Bustos
22	MF	CHI	Valentina Díaz
23	MF	CHI	Claudia Herrera
24	MF	CHI	Emma González
24	FW	CHI	Arantza Suazo
26	MF	CHI	Grettel Suazo
27	GK	CHI	Emilie Borie
28	FW	CHI	Florencia Acevedo
30	MF	CHI	Isidora Espinoza

=== Out on loan ===
Note: Flags indicate national team as defined under FIFA eligibility rules; some limited exceptions apply. Players may hold more than one non-FIFA nationality.

No.	Pos.	Nation	Player
—	GK	CHI	Gabriela Bórquez (at Millonarios F.C. (women))
