= Chile women's national football team =

Women's national football team representing Chile

Chile
- Nickname: La Roja Femenina (The Feminine Red)
- Association: Federación de Fútbol de Chile (FFCh)
- Confederation: CONMEBOL (South America)
- Head coach: Luis Mena
- Captain: Yanara Aedo
- Most caps: Yanara Aedo (125)
- Top scorer: Francisca Lara (27)
- Home stadium: Estadio Nacional de Chile
- FIFA code: CHI
First colours	Second colours

FIFA ranking
- Current: 49 ▼1 (20 October 2026)
- Highest: 36 (December 2019; December 2020)
- Lowest: 54 (March 2007)

First international
- Brazil 6–1 Chile (Maringá, Brazil; 28 April 1991)

Biggest win
- Chile 12–0 Peru (Santiago, Chile; 28 May 2017)

Biggest defeat
- Argentina 8–0 Chile (Mar del Plata, Argentina; 12 November 2006)

World Cup
- Appearances: 1 (first in 2019)
- Best result: Group stage (2019)

Copa América Femenina
- Appearances: 10 (first in 1991)
- Best result: Runners-up (1991, 2018)
Medal record
Pan American Games
Silver medal – second place	2023 Santiago	Team
South American Games
Silver medal – second place	2014 Santiago	Team

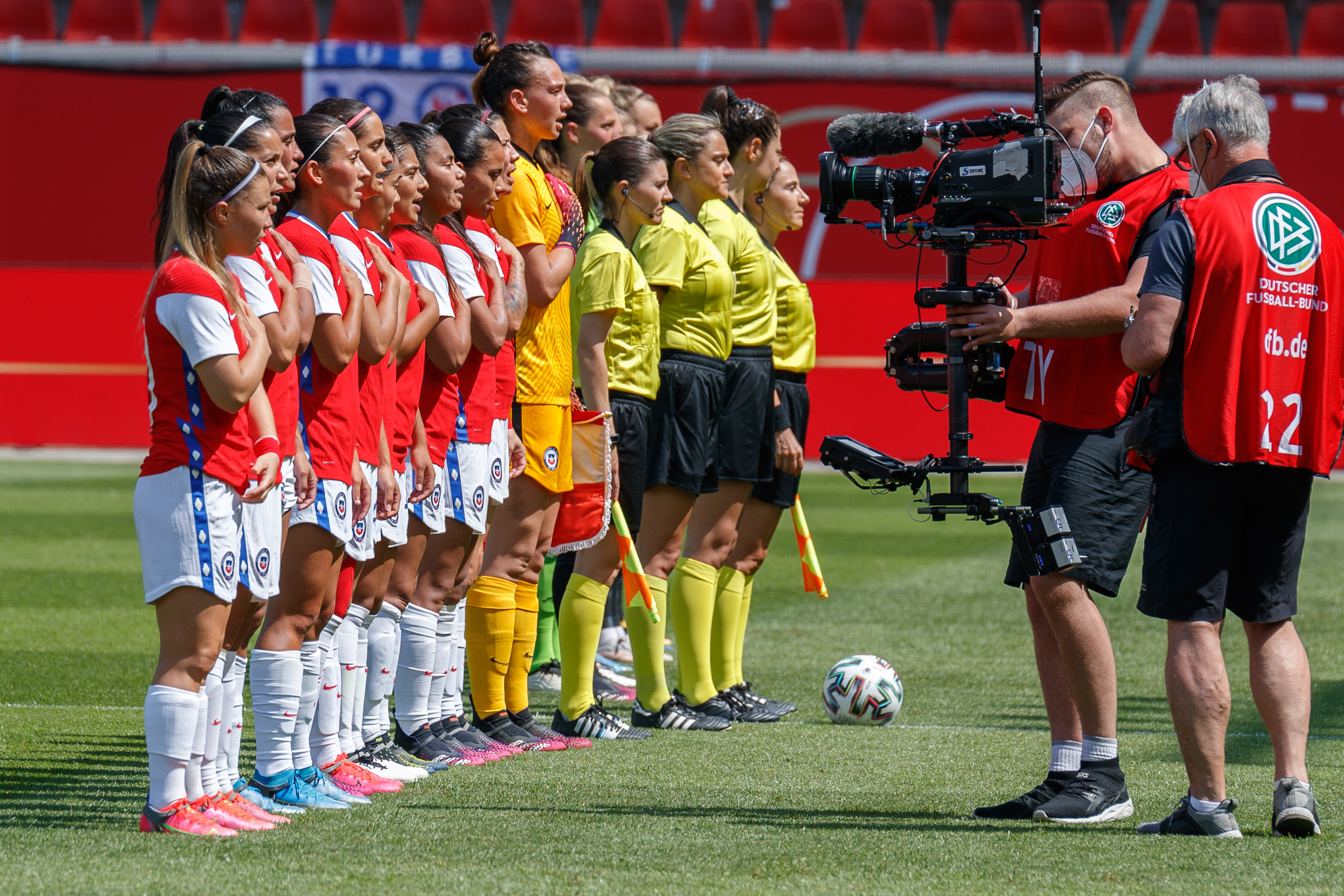
Chile women's national football team in 2021

The Chile women's national football team represents Chile in international women's football. It is administered by the Federación de Fútbol de Chile and is a member of CONMEBOL. Chile came close to qualifying for the FIFA Women's World Cup in 1991, 1995, and 2011, finally qualifying in 2019. Chile is, along with Brazil, one of the two teams to never fail to qualify for the Copa América Femenina. Chile's friendlies are frequently played against Argentina, is a traditional rival. The team is currently coached by Luis Mena and is captained by Yanara Aedo.

Chile, for qualifying to the 2019 FIFA Women's World Cup in France, became the fifth nation in CONMEBOL to have both men's and women's teams qualify for senior FIFA tournaments. Chile is one of only three Spanish-speaking countries to have won a game in the Women's World Cup.

Chile women's national football team qualified for its first Summer Olympic Games in Tokyo 2020.

== History ==
Chile is one of the first participants in the Copa América Femenina, when it did in the inaugural 1991 edition, alongside Brazil and Venezuela. Chile lost 1–6 to the Brazilian hosts and won 1–0 over Venezuela, thus failed to qualify for the 1991 FIFA Women's World Cup. Chile then entered an era of decline in fortunes, only winning third place in 1995 and 2010.

Following the failure to qualify for the 2015 FIFA Women's World Cup, Chile women's team had become inactive for three years, before the team was able to return in May 2017 for a friendly against Peru, won by Chile 12–0. This marked the revival of Chile in women's football fortune, and following the 2018 Copa América Femenina as hosts, Chile rode to eventual second place with fan attendance of Chile's games nearly full, which also confirmed Chile a place in the 2019 FIFA Women's World Cup, the first FIFA Women's World Cup in Chile's women's football history, and was seen with joys among Chilean supporters after its men's counterparts failed to qualify for the 2018 FIFA World Cup and accusations of discrimination based on gender toward female footballers.

Chile was drawn into the group F of the 2019 Women's World Cup, sharing group with two very powerful women's forces, world champions United States and Sweden, alongside Southeast Asian opponent and 2015 edition debutant Thailand. Sitting in a totally too difficult group, Chile nonetheless demonstrated brave performances against Sweden and the United States but could not gain a single point, losing 0–2 to Sweden and 0–3 to the United States respectively, or scoring a single goal. Chile's last match, however, was a crucial meeting against Thailand, whose fighting spirits were even more demoralised following two devastating losses to the United States and Sweden earlier. Chile salvaged with a historic 2–0 triumph over Thailand, but the penalty miss in late minutes by Francisca Lara saw Chile eliminated from the World Cup due to inferior goal differences with Nigeria, which later progressed.

Chile then took part in the 2020 Summer Olympics thanked to beating Cameroon in the playoff, but facing stronger opponents Great Britain, Canada and hosts Japan, the Chileans could not gain even just a draw, though not without putting strong fights as Chile's losses weren't as heavy as expected.

== Team image ==
=== Nicknames ===
The Chile women's national football team has been known or nicknamed as "La Roja Femenina (The Feminine Red)".

=== Home stadium ===
Chile plays their home matches on the Estadio Nacional Julio Martínez Prádanos.

=== Sponsors ===
- Cerveza Cristal
- BCI
- Adidas
- Mega
- DSports (TV broadcaster of Chile's April 2022 friendly matches)

== Results and fixtures ==
The following is a list of match results in the last 12 months, as well as any future matches that have been scheduled.

Legend

Win Draw Loss Fixture Void or Postponed

=== 2025 ===
24 October 2025–26 Liga de Naciones	Venezuela	0–0	Chile	Cabudare, Venezuela
17:00 (UTC−4)	Rodríguez (yellow card) 71'; García (yellow card) 86'	Report		Stadium: Estadio Metropolitano de Cabudare; Referee: Danna Victorino (Colombia)

28 October 2025–26 Liga de Naciones	Chile	5–0	Bolivia	Rancagua, Chile
18:00 UTC−3	Keefe 3' (pen.), 9'; Pinilla 17'; Jiménez 45+1'; López Opazo 46'	Report	Salvatierra (yellow card) 84'	Stadium: Estadio El Teniente; Referee: Marcelly Zambrano (Ecuador)

28 November 2025–26 Liga de Naciones	Peru	3–1	Chile	Cusco, Peru
16:00 UTC−5	G. García (yellow card) 19'; A. García 30'; Campoverde 62'; Bilcape 65' (yellow card) 79'; Mamani (yellow card) 90+4'	Report	López Opazo 41' (yellow card) 90+7'; Cortés (yellow card) 82'	Stadium: Estadio Inca Garcilaso de la Vega; Referee: María Victoria Daza (Colombia)

2 December 2025–26 Liga de Naciones	Chile	1–0	Paraguay	Rancagua, Chile
20:00 UTC−3	Aedo 33' (yellow card) 72'	Report	Garcete (yellow card) 50' (yellow-red card) 69'	Stadium: Estadio El Teniente; Referee: Milagros Arruela (Peru)

=== 2026 ===
27 January Friendly	United States	5–0	Chile	Santa Barbara, California, United States
19:00 UTC−8	Bethune 18'; Joseph 26'; Sams 33'; Sears 46'; Rodman 68'	Report	Aedo (yellow card) 90'	Stadium: Harder Stadium; Attendance: 14,797; Referee: Timothy Derry (Trinidad and Tobago)

4 March Friendly	Paraguay	0–1	Chile	Ypané, Paraguay
19:00 UTC−3	Riso (yellow card) 10'; Garcete (yellow card) 43'; Riveros (yellow card) 62'	Report	Moreno (yellow card) 13'; López Opazo (yellow card) 62'; Valencia 77'	Stadium: CARFEM; Referee: Angelina Rodas (Paraguay)

7 March Friendly	Paraguay	0–1	Chile	Ypané, Paraguay
19:00 UTC−3		Report	Moreno 56' (yellow card) 83'; López (yellow card) 77'	Stadium: CARFEM; Referee: Angelina Rodas (Paraguay)

10 April 2025–26 Liga de Naciones	Chile	0–1	Argentina	Valparaíso, Chile
20:00 UTC−4	Cifuentes (yellow card) 31'; Y. López (yellow card) 71'; Aedo (yellow card) 90+3'	Report	Preininger (yellow card) 17'; Bonsegundo 42' (pen.); Cometti (yellow card) 82'; S. Pereyra (yellow card) 84'	Stadium: Estadio Elías Figueroa Brander; Attendance: 7,300; Referee: Charly Deretti (Brazil)

14 April 2025–26 Liga de Naciones	Colombia	2–0	Chile	Cali, Colombia
20:00 UTC−5	Caicedo 14'; Santos (yellow card) 23'; López (yellow card) 49'; Vanegas 90+6' (pen.)	Report	Cifuentes (yellow card) 27'	Stadium: Estadio Olímpico Pascual Guerrero; Referee: Marcelly Zambrano (Ecuador)

18 April 2025–26 Liga de Naciones	Uruguay	1–3	Chile	Montevideo, Uruguay
18:00 UTC−3	Pa. González 5'; Lacoste (yellow card) 22'; Barone (yellow card) 45'; Ag. Gómez (red card) 86'; Aquino (yellow card) 89'	Report	Valencia 9'; Cifuentes (yellow card) 45'; Acevedo 70'; Pardo 76'	Stadium: Estadio Centenario; Referee: Laura Fortunato (Argentina)

5 June 2025–26 Liga de Naciones	Chile	1–2	Ecuador	Santiago, Chile
19:00 UTC−4	Figueroa (yellow card) 66'; Valencia 73'	Report	Cuadra 36'; Bolaños 80' (pen.); Baquerizo (yellow card) 90+5'	Stadium: Estadio Nacional Julio Martínez Prádanos; Attendance: 22,052; Referee: Anahí Fernández (Uruguay)

11 October Friendly	Chile	7–0	Bolivia	Santiago, Chile
18:00 UTC−3	Cortés 30'; Moreno 41', 52', 53'; Sánchez 77' (pen.); Mendiola 79' (o.g.); Pavez 86'; Soto (yellow card) 88'	Report	Rojas (yellow card) 40'	Stadium: Estadio Bicentenario de La Florida; Referee: Gabriela Arce (Paraguay)

13 October Friendly	Chile	Cancelled	Bolivia	Santiago, Chile
17:00 UTC−3		Report		Stadium: CAR José Sulantay Silva; Attendance: BCD
Note: Cancelled due to weather conditions

28 November Friendly	Spain	v	Chile	León, Spain
18:00 UTC+1				Stadium: Estadio Reino de León

3 December Unofficial Friendly	United States U23	v	Chile	Leganés, Spain
12:30 UTC+1				Stadium: Estadio Ontime Butarque

- Chile Results and Fixtures – Soccerway.com

== Head-to-head record ==
As of 22 February 2023

- Counted for the FIFA A-level matches only.

Nations	First Played	P	W	D	L	GF	GA	GD	Confederation
Argentina	1995	19	6	4	9	22	36	−14	CONMEBOL
Australia	2018	4	1	0	3	5	11	−6	AFC
Bolivia	1995	6	5	0	1	25	7	+18	CONMEBOL
Brazil	1991	15	0	1	14	5	55	−50	CONMEBOL
Cameroon	2021	2	1	1	0	2	1	+1	CAF
Canada	2013	2	1	0	1	2	3	0	CONCACAF
China	2009	2	1	0	1	1	2	−1	AFC
Colombia	1998	14	2	6	6	10	21	−11	CONMEBOL
Costa Rica	2018	3	2	1	0	7	2	0	CONCACAF
Denmark	2010	2	0	0	2	1	6	−5	UEFA
Ecuador	1995	6	4	1	1	12	8	4	CONMEBOL
France	2017	1	0	0	1	0	1	−1	UEFA
Germany	2019	2	0	1	1	0	2	−2	UEFA
Ghana	2020	1	1	0	0	3	0	3	CAF
Great Britain	2021	1	0	0	1	0	2	−2	UEFA
Haiti	2023	1	0	0	1	1	2	−1	CONCACAF
Hungary	1994	1	0	0	1	0	4	−4	UEFA
India	1994	2	2	0	0	5	1	+4	AFC
Italy	2011	3	0	0	3	3	11	−8	UEFA
Jamaica	2019	3	1	0	2	8	4	4	CONCACAF
Japan	2010	2	0	1	1	1	2	−1	AFC
Kenya	2020	1	1	0	0	5	0	+5	CAF
Mexico	2009	5	0	2	3	2	15	−13	CONCACAF
Netherlands	2019	1	0	0	1	0	7	−7	UEFA
Northern Ireland	2020	1	1	0	0	5	0	+5	UEFA
Panama	2023	2	1	0	1	5	3	+2	CONCACAF
Paraguay	2014	4	1	1	2	6	7	−1	CONMEBOL
Peru	1998	5	3	0	2	21	4	+17	CONMEBOL
Philippines	2022	2	1	1	0	2	1	1	AFC
Portugal	2011	1	0	1	0	0	0	0	UEFA
Romania	2011	2	0	1	1	1	3	−2	UEFA
Russia	1994	1	0	0	1	0	2	−2	UEFA
Scotland	2013	2	1	1	0	5	4	+1	UEFA
Slovakia	2021	1	0	0	1	0	1	−1	UEFA
South Africa	2018	2	1	1	0	4	3	+1	CAF
Sweden	2019	1	0	0	1	0	2	−2	UEFA
Thailand	2019	1	1	0	0	2	0	+2	AFC
Trinidad and Tobago	2011	1	1	0	0	3	0	+3	CONCACAF
United States	2018	4	1	0	3	2	11	−9	CONCACAF
Uruguay	2006	8	5	2	1	14	7	+7	CONMEBOL
Uzbekistan	1994	1	1	0	0	5	0	+5	AFC
Venezuela	1991	6	3	1	2	8	4	+4	CONMEBOL
Wales	2011	1	0	0	1	1	2	−1	UEFA
Zambia	2020	1	0	0	1	1	2	−1	CAF

== Coaching staff ==
=== Current coaching staff ===
Position	Name	Ref.
Head coach	(Chile) Luis Mena	

=== Manager history ===
As of 6 June 2026, after match against Ecuador

Below is the record of each head coach in the national team's history. The winning percentages given are with draws counted as ½ wins.

Name	Period	Matches	Wins	Draws	Losses	Winning %	Honours
(Chile) Bernardo Bello	1990–1991	2	1	0	1	50.0%	
(Chile) Sergio Rojas	1993–1995	4	1	1	2	37.5%	
(Chile) Humberto Coppo	1996	0	0	0	0	—	
(Chile) Juan Montenegro	1998	4	1	0	3	25.0%	
(Chile) Claudio Quintiliani	2003	2	0	0	2	0.0%	
(Chile) Manuel Rodríguez Vega	2006	4	1	0	3	25.0%	
(Chile) Nibaldo Rubio	2007	0	0	0	0	—	
(Spain) Marta Tejedor	2007–2011	29	6	9	14	36.2%	
(Chile) Rocío Yáñez	2011–2012	4	0	0	4	0.0%	
(Chile) Ronnie Radonich	2012–2014	12	6	1	5	54.2%	2014 South American Games Silver medal
(Chile) José Letelier	2015–2023	68	23	15	30	44.9%	2019 Torneio Uber Internacional; 2020 Turkish Women's Cup
(Chile) Manuel González	2023	0	0	0	0	—	
(Chile) Luis Mena	2023–	41	23	3	15	59.8%	2023 Pan American Games Silver medal

== Players ==
=== Current squad ===
The following players were called up for the friendly matches against Spain and the United States U23 on 28 November and 3 December 2026, respectively.

Caps and goals correct as of 11 October 2026, after the match against Bolivia.

No.	Pos.	Player	Date of birth (age)	Caps	Goals	Club
	GK	Ryann Torrero	1 September 1990 (age 36)	12	0	(Football Federation of Chile) Colo-Colo
	GK	Ignacia Bustos	13 August 2004 (age 22)	1	0	(Football Federation of Chile) Universidad Católica
	GK	Oriana Cristancho	2 October 2009 (age 17)	0	0	(Football Federation of Chile) Universidad de Chile
	DF	Michelle Acevedo	4 April 2002 (age 24)	30	4	(Football Federation of Chile) Colo-Colo
	DF	Anaís Cifuentes	1 January 2005 (age 21)	15	1	(Football Federation of Chile) Colo-Colo
	DF	Catalina Figueroa	28 January 2005 (age 21)	11	1	(Football Federation of Chile) Universidad de Chile
	DF	Valentina Díaz	30 March 2001 (age 25)	10	0	(Football Federation of Chile) Universidad de Chile
	DF	Monserrat Hernández	19 July 2005 (age 21)	3	0	(Football Federation of Chile) Universidad Católica
	DF	Milenka Pavez	11 February 2002 (age 24)	1	1	(Football Federation of Chile) Unión Española
	DF	Natsumy Millones	1 January 2007 (age 19)	1	0	(Football Federation of Chile) Coquimbo Unido
	MF	Yastin Jiménez	17 October 2000 (age 26)	56	5	(Football Federation of Chile) Colo-Colo
	MF	Millaray Cortés	30 June 2004 (age 22)	24	3	(Italian Football Federation) Fiorentina
	MF	Anaís Álvarez	4 July 2007 (age 19)	6	0	(Football Federation of Chile) Colo-Colo
	MF	Nerea Sánchez	2 December 2004 (age 21)	1	1	(Royal Spanish Football Federation) Eibar
	MF	Amparo Abarca	8 August 2009 (age 17)	1	0	(Football Federation of Chile) Universidad Católica
	FW	Sonya Keefe	11 April 2003 (age 23)	27	7	(Royal Spanish Football Federation) Real Sociedad
	FW	Mary Valencia	8 February 2003 (age 23)	26	5	(Football Federation of Chile) Colo-Colo
	FW	Vaitiare Pardo	20 August 2007 (age 19)	21	3	(Football Federation of Chile) Universidad Católica
	FW	Pamela Cabezas López	10 July 2007 (age 19)	7	3	(Football Federation of Chile) Universidad Católica
	FW	Adriana Moreno	6 December 2000 (age 25)	5	4	(Football Federation of Chile) Coquimbo Unido
	FW	Agustina Heyermann	3 August 2004 (age 22)	3	0	(Football Federation of Chile) Universidad Católica
	FW	Geraldine Mardones	20 December 2008 (age 17)	1	0	(Football Federation of Chile) Colo-Colo

=== Recent call-ups ===
The following players have also been called up to the squad within the past 12 months.

Pos.	Player	Date of birth (age)	Caps	Goals	Club	Latest call-up
GK	Débora Cubillos	14 October 1996 (age 30)	0	0	(Chile) Coquimbo Unido	v. Bolivia, 13 October 2026
GK	Marian Jerez	10 January 2006 (age 20)	0	0	(Chile) Santiago Wanderers	v. Bolivia, 13 October 2026
GK	Christiane Endler (captain)	23 July 1991 (age 35)	112	0	(France) Lyon	v. Ecuador, 5 June 2026
GK	Catalina Mellado	23 May 2006 (age 20)	0	0	(Chile) Universidad Católica	v. United States, 27 January 2026 ^{INJ}
GK	Antonia Canales	16 October 2002 (age 24)	19	0	(Spain) Badalona	v. Paraguay, 2 December 2025 ^{INJ}
DF	Isidora Flores Vitta	13 April 2008 (age 18)	1	0	(Chile) Universidad Católica	v. Bolivia, 13 October 2026
DF	Yordana Martínez	28 July 2004 (age 22)	1	0	(Chile) Coquimbo Unido	v. Bolivia, 13 October 2026
DF	Javiera Soto	23 January 2005 (age 21)	1	0	Unattached	v. Bolivia, 13 October 2026
DF	Camila Sáez	17 October 1994 (age 32)	117	11	(Spain) Valencia	v. Ecuador, 5 June 2026
DF	Fernanda Pinilla	6 November 1993 (age 33)	62	3	(Mexico) León	v. Ecuador, 5 June 2026
DF	Fernanda Ramírez	30 August 1992 (age 34)	26	0	(Chile) Universidad Católica	v. Ecuador, 5 June 2026
DF	Gabriela García	25 February 2006 (age 20)	0	0	Universidad de Chile	v. Ecuador, 5 June 2026
DF	Constanza González	18 September 2010 (age 16)	0	0	(Chile) Universidad Católica	Microcycle, 25–27 May 2026
DF	María Silva	7 October 2004 (age 22)	0	0	Unattached	v. Uruguay, 18 April 2026
DF	Karen Fuentes	3 August 2004 (age 22)	12	0	Universidad de Chile	v. United States, 27 January 2026
DF	Catalina Arias	24 May 2007 (age 19)	1	0	(Chile) Colo-Colo	v. United States, 27 January 2026
MF	Cristina Julio	17 November 1999 (age 27)	8	0	(Chile) Universidad Católica	v. Bolivia, 13 October 2026
MF	Isidora Agurto	9 December 2004 (age 21)	1	0	(Chile) Palestino	v. Bolivia, 13 October 2026
MF	Melany Letelier	28 November 2000 (age 25)	1	0	(Chile) Palestino	v. Bolivia, 13 October 2026
MF	Valentina Peña	10 August 2006 (age 20)	1	0	(Chile) Universidad Católica	v. Bolivia, 13 October 2026
MF	Gabriela MacFarlane	2 May 2005 (age 21)	0	0	(United States) Utah Valley Wolverines	v. Bolivia, 13 October 2026
MF	Valentina Nardone	15 June 2006 (age 20)	0	0	(United States) Saint Joseph's Hawks	v. Bolivia, 13 October 2026
MF	Natalia Pino	1 February 2003 (age 23)	0	0	(Chile) Palestino	v. Bolivia, 13 October 2026
MF	Yanara Aedo	5 August 1993 (age 33)	125	19	(Chile) Colo-Colo	v. Ecuador, 5 June 2026
MF	Yessenia López	20 October 1990 (age 36)	88	10	(Chile) Colo-Colo	v. Ecuador, 5 June 2026
MF	Nayadet López Opazo	5 August 1994 (age 32)	47	3	(Spain) Alavés Gloriosas	v. Ecuador, 5 June 2026
MF	Javiera Grez	11 July 2000 (age 26)	43	2	(Chile) Colo-Colo	v. Ecuador, 5 June 2026
MF	Mariana Morales	14 July 2003 (age 23)	4	0	Universidad de Chile	v. Ecuador, 5 June 2026
MF	Amaral Farías	8 January 2010 (age 16)	0	0	(Chile) Colo-Colo	Microcycle, 25–27 May 2026
MF	Antonella Martínez	14 September 2009 (age 17)	0	0	(Chile) Universidad Católica	Microcycle, 25–27 May 2026
MF	Gisela Pino	1 September 1992 (age 34)	17	0	Universidad de Chile	v. United States, 27 January 2026
MF	Anays Miranda	30 September 2008 (age 18)	0	0	(Chile) Santiago Wanderers	v. Paraguay, 2 December 2025
FW	Sofia Coulombe	22 July 2005 (age 21)	2	0	(Spain) Espanyol B	v. Bolivia, 13 October 2026
FW	Camila Arriagada	1 September 2002 (age 24)	1	0	Unattached	v. Bolivia, 13 October 2026
FW	Rosario Balmaceda	23 March 1999 (age 27)	57	0	(Chile) Colo-Colo	v. Ecuador, 5 June 2026
FW	Katerine Cubillos	6 January 2005 (age 21)	1	0	(Chile) Iquique	Microcycle, 25–27 May 2026
FW	Lesly Olivares	17 September 2000 (age 26)	3	0	(Peru) Universitario	v. Uruguay, 18 April 2026
FW	Ámbar Figueroa	24 October 2007 (age 19)	6	0	(Chile) Universidad Católica	v. Paraguay, 7 March 2026
FW	Francisca Vargas	21 July 2006 (age 20)	1	0	Universidad de Chile	v. United States, 27 January 2026
FW	María José Urrutia	17 December 1993 (age 32)	60	7	(Chile) Colo-Colo	v. Paraguay, 2 December 2025
FW	Yenny Acuña	18 May 1997 (age 29)	51	9	(Chile) Colo-Colo	v. Paraguay, 2 December 2025
Notes: ^{INJ} = Withdrew due to injury; ^{PRE} = Preliminary squad / standby; ^{RET} = Retired from the national team; ^{SUS} = Withdrew from the squad due to suspension; ^{WD} = Player withdrew from the squad due to non-injury issue -->; ^{TRP} = Invited as a training player

=== Notable players ===
- Ada Cruz

=== Captains ===
- Patricia Hermida (1990–1991)
- Bella Lemus (1991)
- Alexandra Benado (2008–2010)
- Christiane Endler (2014–2023, 2025–Present)
- Yanara Aedo (2023–2025)
- Karen Araya (2025)

=== Previous squads ===
FIFA Women's World Cup

- 2019 FIFA Women's World Cup squad

CONMEBOL Copa América Femenina

- 2018 Copa América Femenina squad

== Records ==
As of 5 June 2026

Players in bold are still active with the national team.

=== Most appearances ===
Rank	Player	Career	Caps	Goals
1	**Yanara Aedo**	2010–present	125	19
2	**Camila Sáez**	2011–present	117	11
3	**Christiane Endler**	2009–present	112	0
4	**Karen Araya**	2006–present	106	19
5	**Francisca Lara**	2009–present	94	27
6	**Yessenia López**	2017–present	88	10
7	**Carla Guerrero**	2006–present	84	6
8	Daniela Zamora	2009–2024	77	10
9	**Fernanda Pinilla**	2011–present	62	3
10	**María José Urrutia**	2018–present	59	7

=== Top goalscorers ===
Rank	Player	Career	Goals	Caps	Avg.
1	**Francisca Lara**	2009–present	27	94	0.29
2	**Karen Araya**	2006–present	19	106	0.18
2	**Yanara Aedo**	2010–present	19	125	0.15
4	María José Rojas	2010–2023	12	57	0.21
5	Fernanda Araya	2011–2025	11	22	0.50
5	**Camila Sáez**	2011–present	11	117	0.09
7	Daniela Zamora	2009–2024	10	77	0.13
7	**Yessenia López**	2017–present	10	88	0.11
9	**Yenny Acuña**	2021–present	9	51	0.18
10	**Sonya Keefe**	2022–present	7	27	0.26
10	**María José Urrutia**	2018–present	7	59	0.12

== Honours ==
=== Major competitions ===
- Copa América Femenina
  - (silver) Runners-up (2): 1991, 2018
  - (bronze) Third place (2): 1995, 2010

=== Others competitions ===
Intercontinental

- Pan American Games
  - (silver) Silver Medalists (1): 2023

Continental

- South American Games
  - (silver) Silver Medalists (1): 2014

=== Friendly ===
- Turkish Women's Cup
  - (gold) Champions (1): 2020
- International Tournament Brazil
  - (gold) Champions (1): 2019

== Competitive record ==
=== FIFA Women's World Cup ===
FIFA Women's World Cup record
Year	Result	Pld	W	D*	L	GF	GA	GD
(China) 1991	Did not qualify							
(Sweden) 1995	Did not qualify							
(United States) 1999	Did not qualify							
(United States) 2003	Did not qualify							
(China) 2007	Did not qualify							
(Germany) 2011	Did not qualify							
(Canada) 2015	Did not qualify							
(France) 2019	Group stage	3	1	0	2	2	5	−3
(Australia) (New Zealand) 2023	Did not qualify							
(Brazil) 2027	Did not qualify							
(Costa Rica) (Jamaica) (Mexico) (United States) 2031	To be determined							
(United Kingdom) 2035	To be determined							
Total	1/12	3	1	0	2	2	5	−3

FIFA Women's World Cup history
Year	Round	Date	Opponent	Result	Stadium
(France) 2019	Group stage	11 June	Sweden	L 0–2	Roazhon Park, Rennes
(France) 2019	Group stage	16 June	United States	L 0–3	Parc des Princes, Paris
(France) 2019	Group stage	20 June	Thailand	W 2–0	Roazhon Park, Rennes

=== Olympic Games ===
Summer Olympics record
Year	Result	Position	Matches	Wins	Draws	Losses	GF	GA
(United States) 1996	Did not qualify							
(Australia) 2000	Did not qualify							
(Greece) 2004	Did not qualify							
(China) 2008	Did not qualify							
(United Kingdom) 2012	Did not qualify							
(Brazil) 2016	Did not qualify							
(Japan) 2020	Group stage	11th	3	0	0	3	1	5
(France) 2024	Did not qualify							
Total	1/8		3	0	0	3	1	5

Summer Olympics history
Year	Round	Date	Opponent	Result	Stadium
(Japan) 2020	Group stage	21 July	Great Britain	0–2	Sapporo Dome, Sapporo
(Japan) 2020	Group stage	24 July	Canada	1–2	Sapporo Dome, Sapporo
(Japan) 2020	Group stage	27 July	Japan	0–1	Miyagi Stadium, Rifu

=== CONMEBOL Copa América Femenina ===
CONMEBOL Copa América Femenina record
Year	Result	Matches	Wins	Draws	Losses	GF	GA
(Brazil) 1991	Runners-up	2	1	0	1	2	6
(Brazil) 1995	Third place	4	1	1	2	14	9
(Argentina) 1998	Group stage	4	1	0	3	6	13
(Peru) (Argentina) (Ecuador) 2003	Group stage	2	0	0	2	2	9
(Argentina) 2006	Group stage	4	1	0	3	5	13
(Ecuador) 2010	Third place	7	3	2	2	11	8
(Ecuador) 2014	Group stage	4	2	0	2	6	5
(Chile) 2018	Runners-up	7	3	3	1	13	5
(Colombia) 2022	Fifth place	5	2	1	2	10	9
(Ecuador) 2025	Sixth place	5	2	0	3	6	7
Total	10/10	44	16	7	21	75	84

=== Pan American Games ===
Pan American Games record
Year	Result	Matches	Wins	Draws	Losses	GF	GA
(Canada) 1999	Did not qualify						
(Dominican Republic) 2003	Did not qualify						
(Brazil) 2007	Did not qualify						
(Mexico) 2011	Group stage	3	1	1	1	3	1
(Canada) 2015	Did not qualify						
(Peru) 2019	Did not qualify						
(Chile) 2023	Runners-up	5	3	0	2	10	5
(Peru) 2027	To be determined						
Total	2/7	8	4	1	3	13	6

=== South American Games ===
South American Games record
Year	Result	Matches	Wins	Draws	Losses	GF	GA
(Chile) 2014	Silver Medal	4	2	1	1	4	2
(Bolivia) 2018 to present	U-20 Tournament						
Total	Silver Medal	4	2	1	1	4	2

== See also ==
- Sport in Chile
  - Football in Chile
    - Women's football in Chile
- Chile women's national under-20 football team
- Chile women's national under-17 football team
- Chile men's national football team
