= 2022 South American Under-20 Women's Football Championship =

8th edition of the South American Under-20 Women's Football Championship

CONMEBOL Sub 20 Femenino Chile 2022

Tournament details
- Host country: Chile
- City: La Calera
- Dates: 6–24 April
- Teams: 10 (from 1 confederation)

Final positions
- Champions: Brazil (9th title)
- Runners-up: Colombia
- Third place: Uruguay
- Fourth place: Venezuela

Tournament statistics
- Matches played: 26
- Goals scored: 86 (3.31 per match)
- Top scorer: (Uruguay) Belén Aquino (10 goals)

The 2022 South American Under-20 Women's Football Championship was the 10th edition of the South American Under-20 Women's Football Championship (Spanish: CONMEBOL Sudamericano Femenino Sub-20), the biennial international youth football championship organised by CONMEBOL for the women's under-20 national teams of South America. It was held in La Calera, Chile from 6 to 24 April 2022.

The top two teams of the tournament qualified for the 2022 FIFA U-20 Women's World Cup in Costa Rica as the CONMEBOL representatives.

Brazil were the defending champions having won the title in 2018 since the final stage of the 2020 edition ended up being cancelled due to the COVID-19 pandemic and consequently there was no champion for that year. Brazil successfully retained their title and won their ninth in a row after finish first in the final stage and alongside the runners-up Colombia qualified for the 2022 FIFA U-20 Women's World Cup.

== Teams ==
All ten CONMEBOL member national teams are eligible to enter the tournament.

| Team | Appearance | Previous best top-4 performance |
|---|---|---|
| Argentina (hosts) | 10th | Runners-up (2006, 2008, 2012) |
| Bolivia | 10th | Fourth place (2004, 2014) |
| Brazil (holders) | 10th | Champions (2004, 2006, 2008, 2010, 2012, 2014, 2015, 2018, 2022) |
| Chile | 10th | Fourth place (2008, 2010) |
| Colombia | 10th | Runners-up (2010) |
| Ecuador | 10th | Third place (2004) |
| Paraguay | 10th | Runners-up (2004, 2014, 2018) |
| Peru | 10th | Fourth place (2006) |
| Uruguay | 10th | None |
| Venezuela | 10th | Runners-up (2015) |

== Venues ==
La Calera
Estadio Municipal Nicolás Chahuán Nazar
Capacity: 9,200
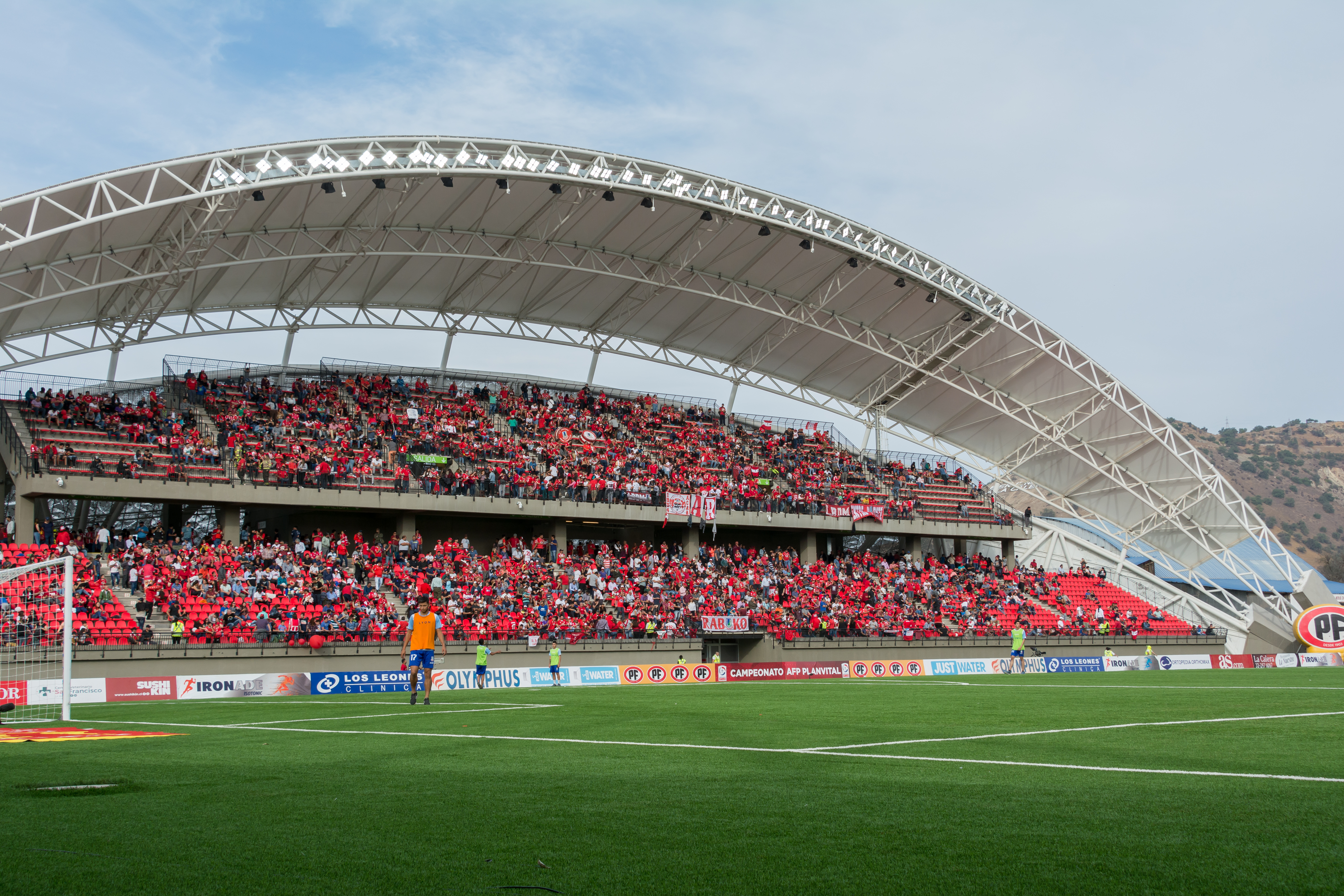

Chile was named as host country of the tournament at the CONMEBOL Council meeting held on 27 October 2021. The Estadio Municipal Nicolás Chahuán Nazar in La Calera will host all the matches.

== Draw ==
The draw was held on 11 March 2022, 12:00 PYST (UTC−3), at the CONMEBOL headquarters in Luque, Paraguay. The hosts Chile and the title holders Brazil were seeded and assigned to the head of the groups A and B respectively. The remaining eight teams were split into four "pairing pots" (Paraguay-Colombia, Venezuela-Ecuador, Argentina-Uruguay, Peru-Bolivia) based on the final placement they reached in the 2018 edition of the tournament (shown in brackets).

| Pot 1 | Pot 2 | Pot 3 | Pot 4 |
|---|---|---|---|
| Paraguay (2); Colombia (3) | Venezuela (4); Ecuador (6) | Argentina (7); Uruguay (8) | Peru (9); Bolivia (10) |

From each pot, the first team drawn was placed into Group A and the second team drawn was placed into Group B. In both groups, teams from pot 1 were allocated in position 2, teams from pot 2 in position 3, teams from pot 3 in position 4 and teams from pot 4 in position 5.

The draw resulted in the following groups:

Group A
| Pos | Team |
|---|---|
| A1 | Chile |
| A2 | Colombia |
| A4 | Venezuela |
| A3 | Argentina |
| A5 | Peru |

Group B
| Pos | Team |
|---|---|
| B1 | Brazil |
| B2 | Paraguay |
| B3 | Ecuador |
| B4 | Uruguay |
| B5 | Bolivia |

== Squads ==
Players born between 1 January 2002 and 31 December 2006 are eligible to compete in the tournament. Each team could register a maximum of 22 and a minimum of 18 players, including at least 2 goalkeepers (Regulations Article 29).

== Match officials ==
On 21 March 2022, CONMEBOL announced the referees appointed for the tournament. For the first time the tournament featured the participation of a UEFA refereeing team as part of the memorandum of understanding signed by CONMEBOL and UEFA in February 2020, which included a referee exchange programme. Referee Helena Cantero was replaced by Zulma Quiñónez, both from Paraguay.

- (Argentina) Roberta Echeverría
  - Assistants: Gisela Truco and Gisela Bosso
- (Bolivia) Jhanet Portugal
  - Assistants: Inés Choque and Elizabeth Blanco
- (Brazil) Thayslane de Melo
  - Assistants: Barbara Da Costa and Brigida Cirilo
- (Chile) Madelaine Rojas
  - Assistants: Loreto Toloza and Leslie Vásquez
- (Colombia) Jenny Arias
  - Assistants: Nataly Arteaga and Carolina Vicuña
- (Ecuador) María Zamora
  - Assistants: Viviana Segura and Nataly Ramírez
- (Paraguay) Zulma Quiñónez
  - Assistants: Nilda Gamarra and Nancy Fernández
- (Peru) Milagros Arruela
  - Assistants: Vera Yupanqui and Mariana Aquino
- (Uruguay) Silvia Ríos
  - Assistants: Adela Sánchez and Daiana Fernández
- (Venezuela) Yercinia Correa
  - Assistants: Migdalia Rodríguez and Laura Cárdenas

UEFA Refereeing team

- (Italy) Maria Sole Ferrieri
  - Assistants: (Spain) Eliana Fernández González and (Italy) Giulia Tempestilli

== First stage ==
In the first stage, the teams are ranked according to points earned (3 points for a win, 1 point for a draw, 0 points for a loss). If tied on points, tiebreakers are applied in the following order (Regulations Article 20):

1. Head-to-head result in games between tied teams;
  1. Points in the matches played between the teams in question;
  2. Goal difference in the matches played between the teams in question;
  3. Number of goals scored in the matches played between the teams in question;
2. Goal difference in all group matches;
3. Number of goals scored in all group matches;
4. Fewest red cards received;
5. Fewest yellow cards received
6. Drawing of lots.

The top two teams of each group advance to the final stage.

All match times are in CLT (UTC−4), as listed by CONMEBOL.

=== Group A ===
| Pos | Team | Pld | W | D | L | GF | GA | GD | Pts | Qualification |
|---|---|---|---|---|---|---|---|---|---|---|
| 1 | Venezuela | 4 | 3 | 1 | 0 | 7 | 1 | +6 | 10 | Final stage |
| 2 | Colombia | 4 | 2 | 2 | 0 | 7 | 1 | +6 | 8 | Final stage |
| 3 | Argentina | 4 | 1 | 2 | 1 | 3 | 2 | +1 | 5 | |
| 4 | Chile (H) | 4 | 1 | 1 | 2 | 3 | 3 | 0 | 4 | |
| 5 | Peru | 4 | 0 | 0 | 4 | 0 | 13 | −13 | 0 | |

Source: CONMEBOL
(H) Hosts
6 April 2022
16:00

| Chile | 0–0 | Argentina |
|---|---|---|
| | Report |

Estadio Municipal Nicolás Chahuán Nazar, La Calera
Referee: Thayslane de Melo (Brazil)
6 April 2022
18:30

| Peru | 0–2 | Venezuela |
|---|---|---|
| | Report | Campos 48', 90' |

Estadio Municipal Nicolás Chahuán Nazar, La Calera
Referee: Jhanet Portugal (Bolivia)

8 April 2022
16:00

| Argentina | 0–0 | Colombia |
|---|---|---|
| | Report |

Estadio Municipal Nicolás Chahuán Nazar, La Calera
Referee: Zulma Quiñónez (Paraguay)
8 April 2022
18:30

| Peru | 0–3 | Chile |
|---|---|---|
| | Report | Valencia 3'; Keefe 45'; Olivares 58' |

Estadio Municipal Nicolás Chahuán Nazar, La Calera
Referee: María Zamora (Ecuador)

10 April 2022
17:00 (Note: The Colombia v Venezuela and Argentina v Perú matches, originally scheduled for 10 April 2022, 18:00 and 20:30 local time respectively, were re-scheduled to 17:00 and 19:30 local time.)

| Colombia | 1–1 | Venezuela |
|---|---|---|
| Robledo 51' | Report | Campos 65' |

Estadio Municipal Nicolás Chahuán Nazar, La Calera
Referee: Silvia Ríos (Uruguay)
10 April 2022
19:30

| Argentina | 3–0 | Peru |
|---|---|---|
| Ippólito 31' (pen.), 32'; Gramaglia 35' | Report |

Estadio Municipal Nicolás Chahuán Nazar, La Calera
Referee: Maria Sole Ferrieri (Italy)

12 April 2022
16:00

| Colombia | 5–0 | Peru |
|---|---|---|
| Rodríguez 7'; Robledo 23'; Reyes 34'; Caicedo 58'; Muñoz 66' | Report |

Estadio Municipal Nicolás Chahuán Nazar, La Calera
Referee: Thayslane de Melo (Brazil)
12 April 2022
18:30

| Venezuela | 2–0 | Chile |
|---|---|---|
| Olivieri 8'; Martínez 75' | Report |

Estadio Municipal Nicolás Chahuán Nazar, La Calera
Referee: Zulma Quiñónez (Paraguay)

14 April 2022
16:00

| Venezuela | 2–0 | Argentina |
|---|---|---|
| Olivieri 73', 89' | Report |

Estadio Municipal Nicolás Chahuán Nazar, La Calera
Referee: Silvia Ríos (Uruguay)
14 April 2022
18:30

| Chile | 0–1 | Colombia |
|---|---|---|
| | Report | Robledo 4' |

Estadio Municipal Nicolás Chahuán Nazar, La Calera
Referee: María Zamora (Ecuador)

=== Group B ===
| Pos | Team | Pld | W | D | L | GF | GA | GD | Pts | Qualification |
|---|---|---|---|---|---|---|---|---|---|---|
| 1 | Brazil | 4 | 4 | 0 | 0 | 17 | 0 | +17 | 12 | Final stage |
| 2 | Uruguay | 4 | 3 | 0 | 1 | 19 | 3 | +16 | 9 | Final stage |
| 3 | Ecuador | 4 | 2 | 0 | 2 | 9 | 9 | 0 | 6 | |
| 4 | Paraguay | 4 | 1 | 0 | 3 | 4 | 9 | −5 | 3 | |
| 5 | Bolivia | 4 | 0 | 0 | 4 | 3 | 31 | −28 | 0 | |

Source: CONMEBOL
7 April 2022
16:00

| Brazil | 2–0 | Uruguay |
|---|---|---|
| Tarciane 63', 66' (pen.) | Report |

Estadio Municipal Nicolás Chahuán Nazar, La Calera
Referee: Madelaine Rojas (Chile)
7 April 2022
18:30

| Bolivia | 1–5 | Ecuador |
|---|---|---|
| San Miguel 11' | Report | Arias 5'; Bolaños 15' (pen.), 49', 53' (pen.), 62' |

Estadio Municipal Nicolás Chahuán Nazar, La Calera
Referee: Maria Sole Ferrieri (Italy)

9 April 2022
17:00 (Note: The Uruguay v Paraguay and Bolivia v Brazil matches, originally scheduled for 9 April 2022, 18:00 and 20:30 local time respectively, were re-scheduled to 17:00 and 19:30 local time.)

| Uruguay | 3–0 | Paraguay |
|---|---|---|
| Aquino 16'; Carballo 75'; Fontan 83' | Report |

Estadio Municipal Nicolás Chahuán Nazar, La Calera
Referee: Jenny Arias (Colombia)
9 April 2022
19:30

| Bolivia | 0–10 | Brazil |
|---|---|---|
| | Report | Cris 3'; Tarciane 6', 51'; Luany 17'; Gi Fernandes 18'; Yaya 27'; Maldaner 31'; Mileninha 53'; Bia 54'; Bruninha 81' |

Estadio Municipal Nicolás Chahuán Nazar, La Calera

11 April 2022
16:00

| Paraguay | 1–3 | Ecuador |
|---|---|---|
| Acosta 70' | Report | Bolaños 37'; Arias 83'; Pesántez 89' |

Estadio Municipal Nicolás Chahuán Nazar, La Calera
Referee: Roberta Echeverría (Argentina)
11 April 2022
18:30

| Uruguay | 13–0 | Bolivia |
|---|---|---|
| Carballo 16', 64', 65'; Aquino 18', 21', 24', 35' (pen.), 38', 59'; Viera 43', 90'; Félix 57'; Emanuele 69' | Report |

Estadio Municipal Nicolás Chahuán Nazar, La Calera
Referee: Yercinia Correa (Venezuela)

13 April 2022
16:00

| Paraguay | 3–2 | Bolivia |
|---|---|---|
| Riveros 5'; Rolón 24'; Coronel 83' | Report | Salvatierra 41', 57' |

Estadio Municipal Nicolás Chahuán Nazar, La Calera
Referee: Madelaine Rojas (Chile)
13 April 2022
18:30

| Ecuador | 0–4 | Brazil |
|---|---|---|
| | Report | Giovaninha 14', 19'; Gi Fernandes 28'; Analuyza 55' |

Estadio Municipal Nicolás Chahuán Nazar, La Calera
Referee: Jenny Arias (Colombia)

15 April 2022
16:00

| Ecuador | 1–3 | Uruguay |
|---|---|---|
| Rosillo 43' | Report | Carballo 3'; Aquino 54', 78' |

Estadio Municipal Nicolás Chahuán Nazar, La Calera
Referee: Roberta Echeverría (Argentina)
15 April 2022
18:30

| Brazil | 1–0 | Paraguay |
|---|---|---|
| Analuyza 67' | Report |

Estadio Municipal Nicolás Chahuán Nazar, La Calera
Referee: Yercinia Correa (Venezuela)

== Final stage ==
In the final stage, the teams are ranked according to points earned (3 points for a win, 1 point for a draw, 0 points for a loss). If tied on points, the same tiebreakers as in the first stage are applied, taking into account only matches in the final stage (Regulations Article 21):

All match times are in CLT (UTC−4), as listed by CONMEBOL.

| Pos | Team | Pld | W | D | L | GF | GA | GD | Pts | Qualification |
|---|---|---|---|---|---|---|---|---|---|---|
| 1 | Brazil (C) | 3 | 3 | 0 | 0 | 5 | 0 | +5 | 9 | 2022 FIFA U-20 Women's World Cup |
| 2 | Colombia | 3 | 2 | 0 | 1 | 6 | 3 | +3 | 6 | 2022 FIFA U-20 Women's World Cup |
| 3 | Uruguay | 3 | 1 | 0 | 2 | 2 | 5 | −3 | 3 | |
| 4 | Venezuela | 3 | 0 | 0 | 3 | 1 | 6 | −5 | 0 | |

Source: CONMEBOL
(C) Champions
18 April 2022
16:00

| Venezuela | 1–2 | Uruguay |
|---|---|---|
| Martínez 70' | Report | Aquino 12' (pen.); Terra 71' |

Estadio Municipal Nicolás Chahuán Nazar, La Calera
Referee: Maria Sole Ferrieri (Italy)
18 April 2022
18:30

| Brazil | 3–0 | Colombia |
|---|---|---|
| Giovaninha 16'; Analuyza 39'; Isabelle Guimarães 90+2' | Report |

Estadio Municipal Nicolás Chahuán Nazar, La Calera
Referee: Zulma Quiñónez (Paraguay)

21 April 2022
16:00

| Uruguay | 0–1 | Brazil |
|---|---|---|
| | Report | Cris 28' |

Estadio Municipal Nicolás Chahuán Nazar, La Calera
Referee: María Laura Fortunato (Argentina)
21 April 2022
18:30

| Colombia | 3–0 | Venezuela |
|---|---|---|
| Robledo 36', 90+3'; Guerra 76' | Report |

Estadio Municipal Nicolás Chahuán Nazar, La Calera
Referee: María Carvajal (Chile)

24 April 2022
17:00

| Uruguay | 0–3 | Colombia |
|---|---|---|
| | Report | Izquierdo 7'; Robledo 17' (pen.), 32' |

Estadio Municipal Nicolás Chahuán Nazar, La Calera
Referee: Zulma Quiñónez (Paraguay)
24 April 2022
19:30

| Venezuela | 0–1 | Brazil |
|---|---|---|
| | Report | Yaya 3' |

Estadio Municipal Nicolás Chahuán Nazar, La Calera
Referee: Milagros Arruela (Peru)

== Goalscorers ==
There were 86 goals scored in 26 matches, for an average of 3.31 goals per match.

10 goals

- (Uruguay) Belén Aquino

7 goals

- (Colombia) Gisela Robledo

5 goals

- (Ecuador) Nayely Bolaños
- (Uruguay) Wendy Carballo

4 goals

- (Brazil) Tarciane

3 goals

- (Brazil) Analuyza
- (Brazil) Giovaninha
- (Venezuela) Kimberlyn Campos
- (Venezuela) Bárbara Olivieri

2 goals

- (Argentina) Dalila Ippólito
- (Bolivia) Yuditza Salvatierra
- (Brazil) Cris
- (Brazil) Gi Fernandes
- (Brazil) Vitória Yaya
- (Ecuador) Emily Arias
- (Uruguay) Juliana Viera
- (Venezuela) Bárbara Martínez

1 goal

- (Argentina) Paulina Gramaglia
- (Bolivia) Luana San Miguel
- (Brazil) Bia
- (Brazil) Bruninha
- (Brazil) Isabelle Guimarães
- (Brazil) Luany
- (Brazil) Patricia Maldaner
- (Brazil) Mileninha
- (Chile) Sonya Keefe
- (Chile) Michelle Olivares
- (Chile) Mary Valencia
- (Colombia) Kelly Caicedo
- (Colombia) Ingrid Guerra
- (Colombia) Ilana Izquierdo
- (Colombia) Mariana Muñoz
- (Colombia) María Camila Reyes
- (Colombia) Gabriela Rodríguez
- (Ecuador) Danna Pesantez
- (Ecuador) Paulina Rosillo
- (Paraguay) Fátima Acosta
- (Paraguay) Zunilda Coronel
- (Paraguay) Antonia Riveros
- (Paraguay) Milagros Rolón
- (Uruguay) Catalina Emanuele
- (Uruguay) Josefina Félix
- (Uruguay) Oriana Fontan
- (Uruguay) Martina Terra

== Qualified teams for FIFA U-20 Women's World Cup ==
The following two teams from CONMEBOL qualify for the 2022 FIFA U-20 Women's World Cup.

| Team | Qualified on | Previous appearances in tournament^{1} |
|---|---|---|
| Brazil | 21 April 2022 | 9 (2002, 2004, 2006, 2008, 2010, 2012, 2014, 2016, 2018) |
| Colombia | 24 April 2022 | 1 (2010) |

^{1} Bold indicates champions for that year. Italic indicates hosts for that year.
