= 2026 Boston Legacy FC season =

Boston Legacy's 2026 National Women's Soccer League season

Boston Legacy FC
2026 season
- Owner: Boston Unity Soccer Partners
- General Manager: Domènec Guasch
- Head Coach: Filipa Patão
- Stadium: Gillette Stadium; Centreville Bank Stadium
- NWSL: 13th
- Playoffs: DNQ
- Top goalscorer: Amanda Gutierres (11)
- Highest home attendance: 30,207 (Mar 14 vs. GFC)
- Lowest home attendance: 3,804 (Apr 29 vs. NC)
- Average home league attendance: 10,809
Home colors	Away colors
- All statistics correct as of November 1, 2026.

The 2026 season was the inaugural season of Boston Legacy FC as a professional women's soccer team. The club played in the National Women's Soccer League (NWSL), the top tier of soccer in the United States. Boston Legacy FC played their home games at Gillette Stadium in Foxborough, Massachusetts, and at Centreville Bank Stadium in Pawtucket, Rhode Island.

== Summary ==
The NWSL expansion team launched in the 2026 NWSL season, alongside Denver Summit FC, which brought the NWSL to 16 teams.

On March 3, 2025, the club announced the hiring of Edward Gallagher as their first director of player recruitment. On March 26, 2025, the club announced the hiring of Domènec Guasch as general manager.

In May 2025, the team announced they would play their full first season at Gillette Stadium in Foxborough, Massachusetts, as White Stadium renovations have not been completed. Seven of the team's fifteen home matches were scheduled to be played at Centreville Bank Stadium in Pawtucket, Rhode Island, due to scheduling conflicts at Gillette Stadium during the 2026 FIFA Men's World Cup.

On June 25, 2025, the club announced that they had hired Filipa Patão as the club's inaugural head coach.

On July 2, 2025, Annie Karich became the first ever signing for Boston Legacy FC.

In June 2026, the team broke ground on a 30,000-square-foot training facility in Brockton that was scheduled to open by the end of 2026, with an all-seasons bubble dome to be completed in January 2027.

The club had planned to move all matches to White Stadium in Boston in 2027, but following a protracted legal challenge by the Emerald Necklace Conservatory and local residents that ended with a Massachusetts Supreme Judicial Court decision on August 19, 2026, the club instead planned to move home matches to Centreville Bank Stadium in 2027 and to White Stadium in 2028.

== Squad ==
As of August 9, 2026

No.	Pos.	Nation	Player
1	GK	USA	Casey Murphy
2	DF	USA	Lilly Reale
3	DF	BRA	Kaká (D45)
4	DF	USA	Emerson Elgin
5	MF	DEN	Josefine Hasbo
6	MF	USA	Annie Karich
7	FW	CAN	Amanda Allen
8	FW	USA	Sammy Smith
9	FW	BRA	Amanda Gutierres
10	FW	USA	Ella Stevens
11	MF	USA	Chloe Ricketts (D45)
12	FW	CAN	Nichelle Prince
13	FW	UGA	Fauzia Najjemba (SEI)
14	FW	MLI	Aissata Traoré
15	MF	USA	Aleigh Gambone
16	DF	COL	Jorelyn Carabalí
18	GK	USA	Laurel Ivory
20	DF	MEX	Nicki Hernández
21	MF	VEN	Bárbara Olivieri
24	DF	BRA	Laís Araújo
26	MF	ESP	Alba Caño
29	DF	USA	Deja Davis
34	DF	USA	Laurel Ansbrow
53	DF	CAN	Bianca St-Georges
87	GK	JPN	Hannah Stambaugh

=== Out on loan ===
No.	Pos.	Nation	Player
25	MF	USA	Sophia Lowenberg (on loan to Brooklyn FC)

== Competitions ==
=== Regular season ===
==== Regular season standings ====
Pos	Team	Pld	W	D	L	GF	GA	GD	Pts
11	Orlando Pride	30	11	3	16	39	47	−8	36
12	Houston Dash	30	9	6	15	38	44	−6	33
13	Boston Legacy FC	30	9	6	15	41	53	−12	33
14	Bay FC	30	7	6	17	30	47	−17	27
15	Racing Louisville FC	30	7	3	20	38	62	−24	24

Source: NWSL
Rules for classification: 1) points; 2) total goal difference; 3) total wins; 4) total goals scored; 5) head-to-head points; 6) head-to-head goal goals scored; 7) fewest disciplinary points; 8) coin toss (if 2 clubs tied) or drawing of lots (if ≥3 clubs tied).

==== Results summary ====
Overall								Home						Away					
Pld	W	D	L	GF	GA	GD	Pts	W	D	L	GF	GA	GD	W	D	L	GF	GA	GD
30	9	6	15	41	53	−12	33	5	2	8	23	27	−4	4	4	7	18	26	−8

Last updated: November 1, 2026.
Source: NWSLsoccer.com

==== Results by matchday ====
Matchday	1	2	3	4	5	6	7	8	9	10	11	12	13	14	15	16	17	18	19	20	21	22	23	24	25	26	27	28	29	30
Ground	H	A	H	H	A	H	H	A	H	A	H	A	H	H	A	H	H	A	H	A	A	H	A	A	H	A	A	H	A	A
Result	L	L	L	L	L	D	W	D	W	D	L	L	D	W	W	L	W	D	L	L	L	L	W	W	L	L	W	W	D	L
Position	15	16	16	16	16	16	16	16	14	14	14	15	15	14	12	14	13	12	12	14	14	15	14	13	14	14	13	12	13	13

Updated to match(es) played on November 1, 2026. Source: NWSLsoccer.com
A = Away; H = Home; W = Win; D = Draw; L = Loss; P = Postponed; = NWSL Shield; = NWSL Playoffs

==== March ====
March 14, 2026 1	Boston Legacy FC	0–1	Gotham FC	Foxborough, Massachusetts
12:30 p.m. EDT (UTC-4)	Caño (yellow card) 29'; St-Georges (yellow card) 40' (yellow-red card) 77'; Carabalí (yellow card) 73'; Kaká (yellow card) 88'; Karich (yellow card) 90+2'	Report	Carter (yellow card) 30'; González 55'; Purce (yellow card) 83'; Howell (yellow card) 90+6'	Stadium: Gillette Stadium; Attendance: 30,207; Referee: Jeremy Scheer

March 21, 2026 2	Houston Dash	3–0	Boston Legacy FC	Houston, Texas
4:00 p.m. EDT (UTC-4)	Berkely (penalty missed) 13'; Van Zanten 43', 59'; Colaprico (yellow card) 57'; Rader 65'	Report	Gutierres (yellow card) 29'; Carabalí (yellow card) 75'	Stadium: Shell Energy Stadium; Attendance: 10,259; Referee: Lauren Aldrich

March 28, 2026 3	Boston Legacy FC	1–2	Utah Royals	Foxborough, Massachusetts
12:00 p.m. EDT (UTC-4)	Traoré (yellow card) 17' (goal) 72'; Stevens (yellow card) 36'; Karich (yellow card) 45+5'; Caño (yellow card) 68'	Report	Milazzo 33'; Tanaka (yellow card) 45+4'; Lacasse (yellow card) 47'; Prašnikar 50' (pen.); Del Fava (yellow card) 78'; Palacios (yellow card) 90+6'	Stadium: Gillette Stadium; Attendance: 10,012; Referee: Elvis Osmanovic

==== April ====
April 4, 2026 4	Boston Legacy FC	0–1	San Diego Wave FC	Foxborough, Massachusetts
8:00 p.m. EDT (UTC-4)	Carabalí (yellow card) 36'; Ansbrow (yellow card) 58'	Report	Ludmila 63'; Portilho (yellow card) 90'	Stadium: Gillette Stadium; Attendance: 10,123; Referee: Danielle Chesky

April 25, 2026 5	Chicago Stars FC	2–0	Boston Legacy FC	Evanston, Illinois
6:30 p.m. EDT (UTC-4)	Huitema 10'; Farmer (yellow card) 27'; Grosso (yellow card) 33'; Gomes 51'	Report	Prince (yellow card) 40'; Traoré (yellow card) 78'	Stadium: Martin Stadium; Attendance: 4,579; Referee: Calin Radosav

April 29, 2026 6	Boston Legacy FC	2–2	North Carolina Courage	Foxborough, Massachusetts
8:00 p.m. EDT (UTC-4)	Caño 5'; Smith 13'; Traoré (yellow card) 69'	Report	Vine (yellow card) 49'; Weatherholt 53'; Koyama (yellow card) 55'; Sanchez 76'; Okafor (yellow card) 90+6'	Stadium: Gillette Stadium; Attendance: 3,804; Referee: Thomas Snyder

==== May ====
May 3, 2026 7	Boston Legacy FC	3–2	Denver Summit FC	Foxborough, Massachusetts
3:00 p.m. EDT (UTC-4)	Prince 44'; St-Georges (yellow card) 59' (goal) 90+4'; Traoré 90'	Report	Ryan 18'; Flint 77' (yellow card) 90+4'	Stadium: Gillette Stadium; Attendance: 12,524; Referee: Jaclyn Metz

May 9, 2026 8	Gotham FC	1–1	Boston Legacy FC	Harrison, New Jersey
6:30 p.m. EDT (UTC-4)	Shaw 37'	Report	Olivieri (yellow card) 21'; Smith (yellow card) 28'; Caño 40' (yellow card) 45+2'; Araújo (yellow card) 67'	Stadium: Sports Illustrated Stadium; Attendance: 11,308; Referee: Matthew Thompson

May 12, 2026 9	Boston Legacy FC	2–1	Orlando Pride	Foxborough, Massachusetts
7:00 p.m. EDT (UTC-4)	Araújo (yellow card) 48'; Gambone 72'; Smith (yellow card) 83'; Gutierres 90+8' (pen.)	Report	Marta 14' (pen.); Doyle (yellow card) 44'; Raabe (yellow card) 85'	Stadium: Gillette Stadium; Attendance: 8,182; Referee: Katja Koroleva

May 15, 2026 10	Bay FC	1–1	Boston Legacy FC	San Jose, California
10:00 p.m. EDT (UTC-4)	Bailey 51'; Silkowitz (yellow card) 63'	Report	St-Georges (red card) 42'; Gutierres 64' (pen.); Karich (yellow card) 76'	Stadium: PayPal Park; Attendance: 12,533; Referee: Gerald Flores

May 22, 2026 11	Boston Legacy FC	1–2	Seattle Reign FC	Pawtucket, Rhode Island
8:00 p.m. EDT (UTC-4)	Traoré 90+4'	Report	Huerta 11' (pen.); Dahlien 51'; Curry (yellow card) 79'	Stadium: Centreville Bank Stadium; Attendance: 9,141; Referee: John Matto

May 30, 2026 12	Kansas City Current	1–0	Boston Legacy FC	Kansas City, Missouri
1:30 p.m. EDT (UTC-4)	Chawinga 69'	Report	Karich (yellow card) 84'; Olivieri (yellow card) 90+2'	Stadium: CPKC Stadium; Attendance: 11,500; Referee: Brad Jensen

==== July ====
July 5, 2026 13	Boston Legacy FC	2–2	Bay FC	Pawtucket, Rhode Island
12:00 p.m. EDT (UTC-4)	Murphy (yellow card) 3'; Carabalí (yellow card) 8'; Gutierres 45+2'; Traoré 79' (pen.); Karich (yellow card) 81'	Report	Hutton 5' (pen.); Lema 17'; Courtnall (yellow card) 90+11'	Stadium: Centreville Bank Stadium; Attendance: 8,014; Referee: Joshua Encarnación

July 10, 2026 14	Boston Legacy FC	2–0	Chicago Stars FC	Pawtucket, Rhode Island
8:00 p.m. EDT (UTC-4)	Gutierres 22' (pen.); Prince 58'; Caño (yellow card) 76'	Report		Stadium: Centreville Bank Stadium; Attendance: 7,463; Referee: Shawn Tehini

July 15, 2026 15	Orlando Pride	0–1	Boston Legacy FC	Orlando, Florida
7:00 p.m. EDT (UTC-4)	McCutcheon (yellow card) 26'; Anderson (yellow card) 65'	Report	Olivieri 17'; Traoré (yellow card) 35'; Reale (yellow card) 71'; Smith (yellow card) 90+2'	Stadium: Inter&Co Stadium; Attendance: 6,004; Referee: Christian Campo Hernandez

July 19, 2026 16	Boston Legacy FC	1–2	Washington Spirit	Pawtucket, Rhode Island
7:00 p.m. EDT (UTC-4)	St-Georges (yellow card) 53'; Smith 88'	Report	Rudd 25'; Rodman 31'; Abiodun (yellow card) 45+3'; Sullivan (yellow card) 90+2'	Stadium: Centreville Bank Stadium; Attendance: 10,101; Referee: John Matto

July 25, 2026 17	Boston Legacy FC	1–0	Kansas City Current	Pawtucket, Rhode Island
5:00 p.m. EDT (UTC-4)	Traoré 18'; Olivieri (yellow card) 45'; Stevens (red card) 90+6'	Report	LaBonta (yellow card) 83'	Stadium: Centreville Bank Stadium; Attendance: 8,939; Referee: Matthew Corrigan

==== August ====
August 2, 2026 18	Denver Summit FC	1–1	Boston Legacy FC	Centennial, Colorado
9:00 p.m. EDT (UTC-4)	Lynch (yellow card) 65'; Sonis 72' (pen.)	Report	Smith 34'	Stadium: Centennial Stadium; Attendance: 12,380; Referee: Mark Verso

August 9, 2026 19	Boston Legacy FC	3–4	Portland Thorns FC	Pawtucket, Rhode Island
4:00 p.m. EDT (UTC-4)	St-Georges 31'; Caño 42'; Olivieri (yellow card) 69'; Gutierres 82'	Report	Tordin 2', 10', 37'; Wilson 6'; Nijstad (yellow card) 54'; Vilahamn (red card) 58'; McKenzie (yellow card) 64'; Perry (yellow card) 83'; Weaver (yellow card) 87'; Arnold (yellow card) 90+6'	Stadium: Centreville Bank Stadium; Attendance: 10,223; Referee: Jeremy Scheer

August 15, 2026 20	Racing Louisville FC	4–1	Boston Legacy FC	Louisville, Kentucky
6:30 p.m. EDT (UTC-4)	Fischer 44', 62'; O'Kane 53' (pen.); Sears 59'	Report	Smith 90+5'	Stadium: Lynn Family Stadium; Attendance: 7,018; Referee: Calin Radosav

August 22, 2026 21	North Carolina Courage	2–1	Boston Legacy FC	Cary, North Carolina
7:30 p.m. EDT (UTC-4)	Sanchez 10', 90+17' (pen.); Parkinson (yellow card) 83'	Report	Traoré 90+2'; Caño (yellow card) 90+11'	Stadium: WakeMed Soccer Park; Attendance: 8,050; Referee: Laadi Issaka

August 31, 2026 22	Boston Legacy FC	2–5	Angel City FC	Foxborough, Massachusetts
8:00 p.m. EDT (UTC-4)	S. Smith 8'; Traoré 88'	Report	Sentnor 5'; Chilufya 14', 58'; Jónsdóttir 18'; Niehues 66'	Stadium: Gillette Stadium; Attendance: 9,681; Referee: Muhammad Hassan

==== September ====
September 5, 2026 23	Utah Royals FC	1–2	Boston Legacy FC	Sandy, Utah
9:30 p.m. EDT (UTC-4)	Palacios 17'; Cronin (yellow card) 88'	Report	Traoré 10'; Karich (yellow card) 75'; Gambone 86'	Stadium: America First Field; Attendance: 8,112; Referee: Corbyn May

September 13, 2026 24	Washington Spirit	0–3	Boston Legacy FC	Washington, D.C.
1:00 p.m. EDT (UTC-4)	Hershfelt (yellow card) 39'; Ngock (yellow card) 43'; Martínez (yellow card) 76'	Report	Carabalí (yellow card) 20'; Hernández (yellow card) 45+5'; Traoré 81'; Gutierres 90+4', 90+6'	Stadium: Audi Field; Attendance: 15,588; Referee: Nabil Bensalah

September 20, 2026 25	Boston Legacy FC	1–2	Houston Dash	Pawtucket, Rhode Island
2:00 p.m. EDT (UTC-4)	Traoré (yellow card) 24', (goal) 59'	Report	Colaprico 44'; Bright 85'	Stadium: Centreville Bank Stadium; Attendance: 9,739; Referee: Brad Jensen

September 25, 2026 26	Seattle Reign FC	2–0	Boston Legacy FC	Seattle, Washington
8:30 p.m. EDT (UTC-4)	Fishlock 23', 64'	Report	Davis (yellow card) 18'	Stadium: Lumen Field; Attendance: 7,116; Referee: Elton García

==== October and November ====
October 3, 2026 27	Portland Thorns FC	2–4	Boston Legacy FC	Portland, Oregon
8:45 p.m. EDT (UTC-4)	Reyes (yellow card) 6'; Wilson (red card) 22'; Tordin 59' (pen.); Turner (yellow card) 64'; Harvey 90'; Fleming (yellow card) 90+5'	Report	Olivieri (yellow card) 27'; Caño 35'; Schupansky 39'; Murphy (yellow card) 58'; Gutierres 88', 90+3'	Stadium: Providence Park; Attendance: 17,860; Referee: Calin Radosav

October 16, 2026 28	Boston Legacy FC	2–1	Racing Louisville FC	Foxborough, Massachusetts
8:00 p.m. EDT (UTC-4)	Gutierres 9'; Davis 51'; Reale (yellow card) 90'	Report	Fischer 22'	Stadium: Gillette Stadium; Attendance: 13,892; Referee: John Griggs

October 25, 2026 29	San Diego Wave FC	2–2	Boston Legacy FC	San Diego, California
7:00 p.m. EDT (UTC-4)	Corley 51'; Araújo 54' (o.g.); Dali (yellow card) 90+3'	Report	Karich 48'; Caño 73'; Ivory (yellow card) 90+3'	Stadium: Snapdragon Stadium; Attendance: 15,701; Referee: Matthew Corrigan

November 1, 2026 30	Angel City FC	4–1	Boston Legacy FC	Carson, California
5:00 p.m. EST (UTC-5)	Martin 17'; Borges (yellow card) 19'; Shores 53'; Jónsdóttir 72'; Emslie 84'	Report	Gutierres 37'	Stadium: Dignity Health Sports Park; Attendance: 17,860; Referee: Brad Jensen

== Statistics ==
=== Appearances and goals ===
Starting appearances are listed first, followed by substitute appearances after the + symbol where applicable.

As of match played August 15, 2026

No.	Pos	Nat	Player	Total		NWSL	
No.	Pos	Nat	Player	Apps	Goals	Apps	Goals
Goalkeepers
1	GK	(United States) USA	Casey Murphy	20	0	20	0
18	GK	(United States) USA	Laurel Ivory	0	0	0	0
87	GK	(Japan) JPN	Hannah Stambaugh	0	0	0	0
Defenders
2	DF	(United States) USA	Lilly Reale	8	0	8	0
3	DF	(Brazil) BRA	Kaká	2	0	2	0
4	DF	(United States) USA	Emerson Elgin	15	0	15	0
16	DF	(Colombia) COL	Jorelyn Carabalí	20	0	15+5	0
20	DF	(Mexico) MEX	Nicki Hernandez	12	0	3+9	0
24	DF	(Brazil) BRA	Laís Araújo	7	0	6+1	0
29	DF	(United States) USA	Deja Davis	2	0	1+1	0
34	DF	(United States) USA	Laurel Ansbrow	8	0	5+3	0
53	DF	(Canada) CAN	Bianca St-Georges	16	2	15+1	2
Midfielders
5	MF	(Denmark) DEN	Josefine Hasbo	15	0	9+6	0
6	MF	(United States) USA	Annie Karich	20	0	20	0
11	MF	(United States) USA	Chloe Ricketts	6	0	1+5	0
15	MF	(United States) USA	Aleigh Gambone	19	1	4+15	1
21	MF	(Venezuela) VEN	Bárbara Olivieri	19	1	15+4	1
25	MF	(United States) USA	Sophia Lowenberg	1	0	0+1	0
26	MF	(Spain) ESP	Alba Caño	20	3	20	3
Forwards
7	FW	(Canada) CAN	Amanda Allen	11	0	1+10	0
8	FW	(United States) USA	Sammy Smith	19	4	12+7	4
9	FW	(Brazil) BRA	Amanda Gutierres	19	5	10+9	5
10	FW	(United States) USA	Ella Stevens	11	0	4+7	0
12	FW	(Canada) CAN	Nichelle Prince	20	2	19+1	2
13	FW	(Uganda) UGA	Fauzia Najjemba	5	0	1+4	0
14	FW	(Mali) MLI	Aissata Traoré	19	5	14+5	5

== Transactions ==
=== Transfers in ===
Date	Player	Pos.	Previous club	Fee/notes	Ref.
July 2, 2025	(United States) Annie Karich	MF	(Germany) SC Freiburg	Transfer, first ever club signing	
July 10, 2025	(Mali) Aissata Traoré	FW	(France) FC Fleury 91	Transfer	
July 31, 2025	(Spain) Alba Caño	MF	(Spain) Barcelona	Transfer	
August 11, 2025	(United States) Aleigh Gambone	MF	(Scotland) Glasgow City	Transfer	
August 22, 2025	(Venezuela) Bárbara Olivieri	FW	(United States) Houston Dash	Trade	
October 1, 2025	(United States) Chloe Ricketts	MF	(United States) Houston Dash	Transfer	
October 3, 2025	(Brazil) Amanda Gutierres	FW	(Brazil) Palmeiras	Transfer	
December 3, 2025	(United States) Sophia Lowenberg	MF	(United States) Boston College	Transfer	
December 8, 2025	(Brazil) Laís Araújo	DF	(Portugal) Benfica	Transfer	
December 15, 2025	(United States) Casey Murphy	GK	(United States) North Carolina Courage	Free agent	
December 17, 2025	(United States) Laurel Ivory	GK	(United States) Kansas City Current	Free agent	
December 22, 2025	(United States) Ella Stevens	FW	(United States) Gotham FC	Free agent	
December 26, 2025	(Canada) Amanda Allen	FW	(United States) Orlando Pride	Transfer	
December 29, 2025	(United States) Sammy Smith	FW	(Iceland) Breiðablik	Transfer	
January 2, 2026	(Canada) Bianca St-Georges	MF	(United States) Utah Royals	Free agent	
January 5, 2026	(Mexico) Nicolette Hernández	DF	(Mexico) Club América	Free agent	
January 6, 2026	(Brazil) Kaká	DF	(Brazil) São Paulo	Transfer	
January 7, 2026	(Colombia) Jorelyn Carabalí	DF	(England) Brighton & Hove Albion	Transfer	
January 8, 2026	(Uganda) Fauzia Najjemba	FW	(Russia) Dynamo Moscow	Transfer	
January 14, 2026	(Canada) Nichelle Prince	FW	(United States) Kansas City Current	Trade	
February 12, 2026	(Denmark) Josefine Hasbo	MF	(United States) Gotham FC	Trade	
June 17, 2026	(United States) Lilly Reale	DF	(United States) Gotham FC	Traded for $350,000 in allocation money and $50,000 in intraleague transfer fee funds.	
July 1, 2026	(United States) Deja Davis	DF	(France) Paris FC	Free agent	

=== Loans in ===
Start date	End date	Player	Pos.	Loaning club	Fee/notes	Ref.
April 6, 2026	July 1, 2026	(United States) Sam Angel	DF	(United States) Chicago Stars FC	Mutual option between clubs to extend to end of season	

=== Loans out ===
Date	Player	Pos.	Loaned to	Fee/notes	Ref.
July 10, 2026	(United States) Sophia Lowenberg	MF	(United States) Brooklyn FC	Loaned through the end of the 2026 calendar year.	

== See also ==
- 2026 National Women's Soccer League season
- 2026 in American soccer
