= List of Boston Legacy FC players =

Boston Legacy FC players gathering during the club's inaugural match in March 2026

Boston Legacy FC is an American professional women's soccer club which began play in the National Women's Soccer League (NWSL) in 2026 as an expansion team. All rostered players during the NWSL season, including the playoffs, even if they did not make an appearance, are listed below.

== Key ==
- The list is ordered alphabetically.
- Appearances as a substitute are included.
- Statistics are correct as of November 1, 2026, the end of the 2026 NWSL season, and are updated once a year after the conclusion of the NWSL season.
- Players whose names are highlighted in **bold** were active players on the Boston Legacy roster as of the list's most recent update.

Positions key
| GK | Goalkeeper |
| DF | Defender |
| MF | Midfielder |
| FW | Forward |

Nationality
Unless otherwise noted, the nationality of a player is determined by the country they most recently represented in international play, or if said player has not played international football then by their country of birth.
Position
Playing positions are listed according to the player's roster designation as of the list's most recent update.
Years
Years are defined as the first and last calendar years in which the player was rostered for the club in any of the competitions listed below.
Appearances and goals
This list counts appearances and goals in the National Women's Soccer League and NWSL Playoffs.

== Players ==
| Yrs | No. | Pos | Nat | Player | Total | | NWSL | | Playoffs | | Cup | |
| Yrs | No. | Pos | Nat | Player | Apps | Goals | Apps | Goals | Apps | Goals | Apps | Goals |
|---|---|---|---|---|---|---|---|---|---|---|---|---|
| 2026– | 7 | FW | (Canada) CAN | Amanda Allen | 15 | 0 | 15 | 0 | 0 | 0 | 0 | 0 |
| 2026– | 34 | DF | (United States) USA | Laurel Ansbrow | 8 | 0 | 8 | 0 | 0 | 0 | 0 | 0 |
| 2026 | 23 | DF | (United States) USA | Sam Angel | 0 | 0 | 0 | 0 | 0 | 0 | 0 | 0 |
| 2026– | 24 | MF | (Brazil) BRA | Laís Araújo | 10 | 0 | 10 | 0 | 0 | 0 | 0 | 0 |
| 2026– | 26 | MF | (Spain) ESP | Alba Caño | 30 | 5 | 30 | 5 | 0 | 0 | 0 | 0 |
| 2026– | 16 | DF | (Colombia) COL | Jorelyn Carabalí | 26 | 0 | 26 | 0 | 0 | 0 | 0 | 0 |
| 2026– | 29 | DF | (United States) USA | Deja Davis | 11 | 1 | 11 | 1 | 0 | 0 | 0 | 0 |
| 2026– | 4 | DF | (United States) USA | Emerson Elgin | 17 | 0 | 17 | 0 | 0 | 0 | 0 | 0 |
| 2026– | 15 | MF | (United States) USA | Aleigh Gambone | 26 | 2 | 26 | 2 | 0 | 0 | 0 | 0 |
| 2026– | 9 | FW | (Brazil) BRA | Amanda Gutierres | 29 | 11 | 29 | 11 | 0 | 0 | 0 | 0 |
| 2026– | 5 | MF | (Denmark) DEN | Josefine Hasbo | 21 | 0 | 21 | 0 | 0 | 0 | 0 | 0 |
| 2026– | 20 | DF | (Mexico) MEX | Nicki Hernández | 21 | 0 | 21 | 0 | 0 | 0 | 0 | 0 |
| 2026– | 18 | GK | (United States) USA | Laurel Ivory | 5 | 0 | 5 | 0 | 0 | 0 | 0 | 0 |
| 2026– | 3 | DF | (Brazil) BRA | Kaká | 3 | 0 | 3 | 0 | 0 | 0 | 0 | 0 |
| 2026– | 6 | MF | (United States) USA | Annie Karich (Note: Karich was the Legacy's inaugural signing, announced on July 2, 2025.) | 30 | 1 | 30 | 1 | 0 | 0 | 0 | 0 |
| 2026– | 25 | MF | (United States) USA | Sophia Lowenberg | 1 | 0 | 1 | 0 | 0 | 0 | 0 | 0 |
| 2026– | 22 | FW | (Nigeria) NGR | Gift Monday | 2 | 0 | 2 | 0 | 0 | 0 | 0 | 0 |
| 2026– | 1 | GK | (United States) USA | Casey Murphy | 25 | 0 | 25 | 0 | 0 | 0 | 0 | 0 |
| 2026– | 13 | FW | (Uganda) UGA | Fauzia Najjemba | 5 | 0 | 5 | 0 | 0 | 0 | 0 | 0 |
| 2026– | 21 | MF | (Venezuela) VEN | Bárbara Olivieri | 29 | 1 | 29 | 1 | 0 | 0 | 0 | 0 |
| 2026– | 12 | FW | (Canada) CAN | Nichelle Prince | 28 | 2 | 28 | 2 | 0 | 0 | 0 | 0 |
| 2026– | 2 | DF | (United States) USA | Lilly Reale | 16 | 0 | 16 | 0 | 0 | 0 | 0 | 0 |
| 2026– | 11 | MF | (United States) USA | Chloe Ricketts | 6 | 0 | 6 | 0 | 0 | 0 | 0 | 0 |
| 2026– | 23 | MF | (United States) USA | Sarah Schupansky | 9 | 0 | 9 | 0 | 0 | 0 | 0 | 0 |
| 2026– | 8 | FW | (United States) USA | Sammy Smith | 26 | 5 | 26 | 5 | 0 | 0 | 0 | 0 |
| 2026– | 53 | DF | (Canada) CAN | Bianca St-Georges | 26 | 2 | 26 | 2 | 0 | 0 | 0 | 0 |
| 2026– | 87 | GK | (Japan) JPN | Hannah Stambaugh | 0 | 0 | 0 | 0 | 0 | 0 | 0 | 0 |
| 2026– | 10 | FW | (United States) USA | Ella Stevens | 16 | 0 | 16 | 0 | 0 | 0 | 0 | 0 |
| 2026– | 14 | FW | (Mali) MLI | Aïssata Traoré (Note: Traoré scored the Legacy's first-ever goal, coming against the Utah Royals on March 28, 2026.) | 29 | 10 | 29 | 10 | 0 | 0 | 0 | 0 |

== By nationality ==
In total, 29 players representing 11 countries have played for the Boston Legacy.

Note: Countries indicate national team as defined under FIFA eligibility rules. Players may hold more than one non-FIFA nationality.

| Country | Total players |
|---|---|
| Brazil | 3 |
| Canada | 3 |
| Colombia | 1 |
| Denmark | 1 |
| Japan | 1 |
| Mali | 1 |
| Mexico | 1 |
| Nigeria | 1 |
| Spain | 1 |
| Uganda | 1 |
| United States | 15 |

== See also ==
- List of top-division football clubs in CONCACAF countries
- List of professional sports teams in the United States and Canada
