= Guasch =

Guasch is a surname. Notable people with the surname include:

- Andrea Guasch (born 1990), Spanish actress, singer, composer, and dancer
- Bernard Guasch (born 1960), French rugby player
- David Guasch (born 1990), French rugby player
- Domènec Guasch, football executive
- Jorge Guasch (born 1961), Paraguayan football player
- Mike Guasch (born 1958), American businessman and racing driver
- Ricardo Guasch (1933–2010), Mexican equestrian
- Sara Guasch (1918–2005), Chilean actress
- Toni Soler i Guasch (born 1965), Spanish journalist, television producer and writer
