= Sophia Lowenberg =

American soccer player (born 2004)

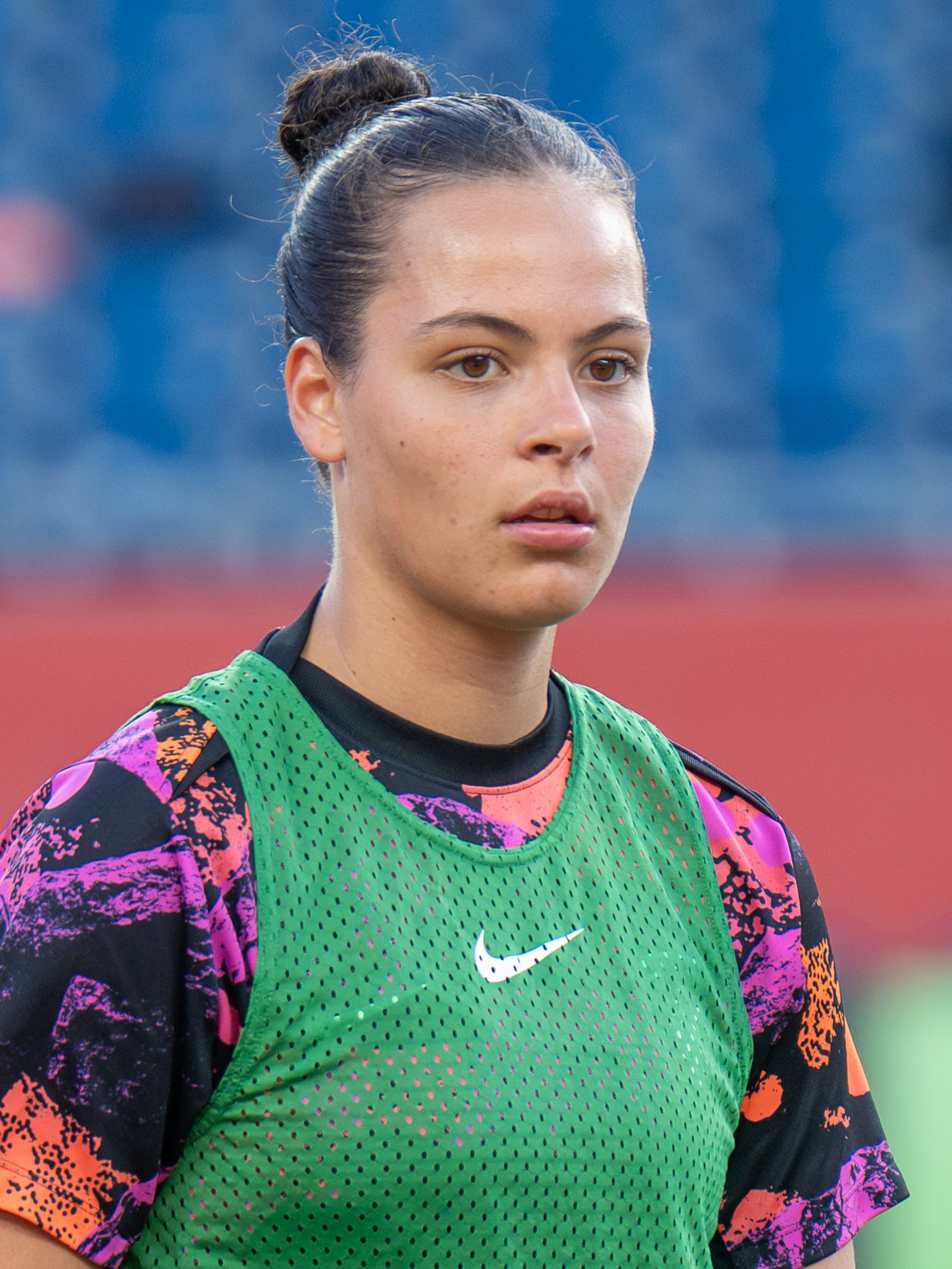
- Lowenberg with the Boston Legacy in 2026

Personal information
- Full name: Sophia Rose Lowenberg
- Date of birth: May 17, 2004 (age 22)
- Place of birth: Connecticut, United States
- Height: 5 ft 9 in (1.75 m)
- Positions: Midfielder; center back

Team information
- Current team: Brooklyn FC (on loan from the Boston Legacy)
- Number: 20

Youth career
- Connecticut FC

College career
Years	Team	Apps	(Gls)
2022–2025	Boston College Eagles	67	(7)

Senior career*
Years	Team	Apps	(Gls)
2026–	Boston Legacy	1	(0)
2026–	→ Brooklyn FC (loan)	1	(0)
- * Club domestic league appearances and goals as of 05:39, August 16, 2026 (UTC)

Sophia Rose Lowenberg (born May 17, 2004) is an American professional soccer player who plays as a midfielder or defender for USL Super League club Brooklyn FC, on loan from Boston Legacy FC. She played college soccer for the Boston College Eagles.

== Early life ==
Lowenberg grew up in Trumbull, Connecticut, one of two children born to Paul Lowenberg and Magda Elmaghrabi. She began playing soccer when she was young and moved up two age groups by the time she was eight. She also trained in mixed martial arts and achieved a second-degree black belt. She played club soccer for Connecticut FC, earning ECNL all-conference honors. She played four years for the varsity team at Trumbull High School, earning all-state honors twice and totaling 33 goals and 56 assists. She developed as an attacking or central midfielder who could also play at center back or forward. She committed to play college soccer for Boston College the summer before her junior year. In 2021, she was named MVP of the High School All-American Game after playing center back for East in a 5–0 victory.

== College career ==
Lowenberg played for the Boston College Eagles from 2022 to 2025, appearing in 67 games, starting 41, and scoring 7 goals. Positionally flexible, she played multiple roles for the team across her career. She recorded career highs with 3 goals and 16 starts in her senior season. Earlier that year, she played in both exhibition games for the Vermont Green women's team coached by Sam Mewis, scoring a stellar goal from distance in the first game and wearing the captain's armband in the second.

== Club career ==
National Women's Soccer League (NWSL) expansion team Boston Legacy FC announced on December 3, 2025, that they had signed Lowenberg to her first professional contract on a two-year deal with the club option for another year. She was the tenth player and first local college product signed to the team. She made her professional debut on May 30, 2026, as a late substitute for Emerson Elgin in a 1–0 loss to the Kansas City Current.

On July 10, 2026, Lowenberg joined USL Super League club Brooklyn FC on loan for the rest of the year. She made her Super League debut on August 15, 2026, earning the start in Brooklyn's season-opening defeat to Lexington SC.
