= Filipa Patão =

Portuguese soccer coach (born 1989)

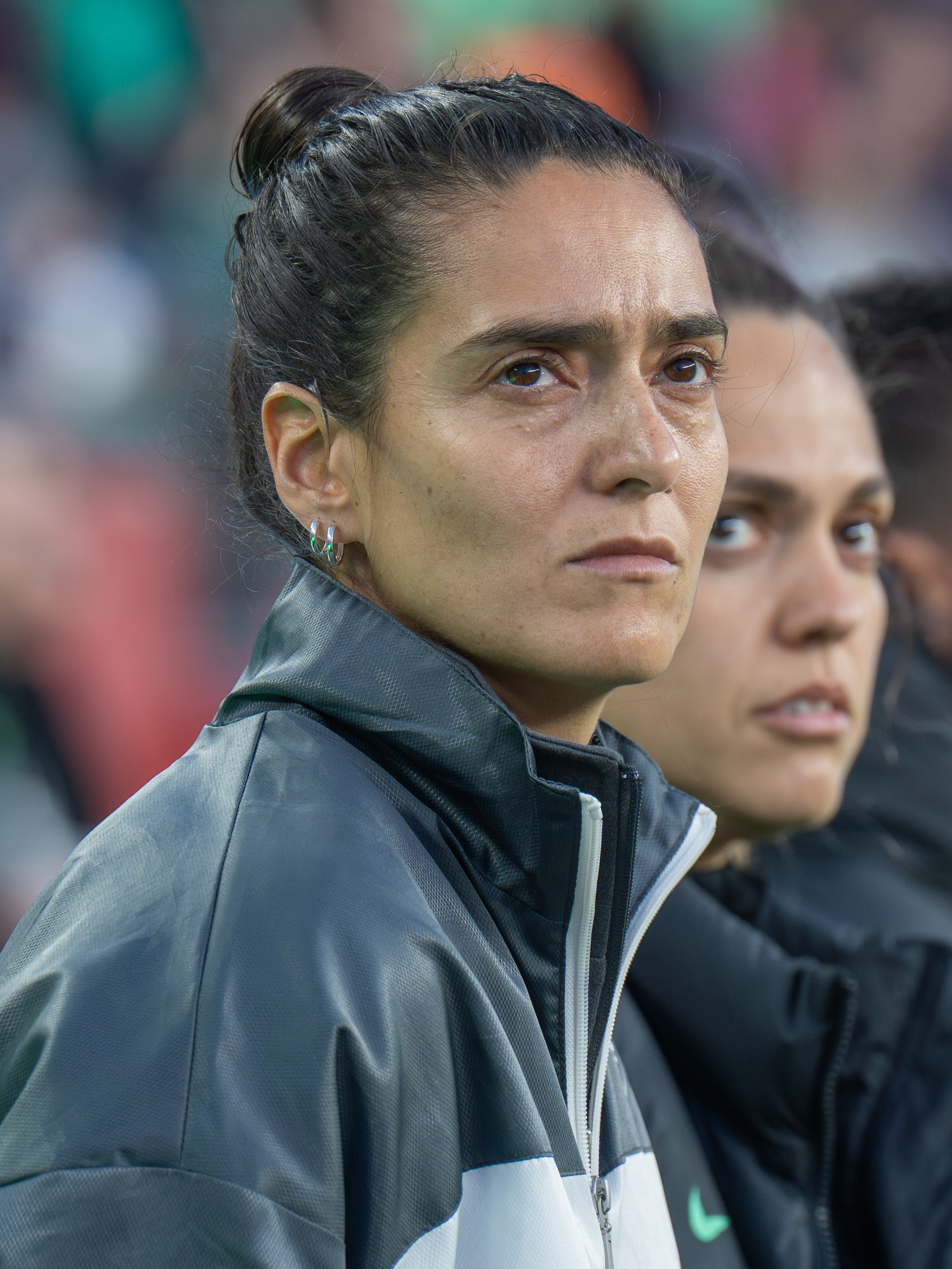
- Patão with the Boston Legacy in 2026

Personal information
- Full name: Filipa Santos Patão
- Date of birth: March 6, 1989 (age 37)
- Position: Centre back

Team information
- Current team: Boston Legacy (head coach)

Youth career
- 2002–2006: 1º Dezembro

Senior career*
Years	Team	Apps	(Gls)
2006–2013	1º Dezembro		
2013–2018	CF Benfica		

International career
2007	Portugal U19	1	(0)
2011	Portugal	1	(0)

Managerial career
- 2020–2025: Benfica
- 2026–: Boston Legacy
- * Club domestic league appearances and goals

Filipa Santos Patão (born March 6, 1989) is a Portuguese football manager and former player who is the head coach of Boston Legacy FC of the National Women's Soccer League (NWSL). She previously managed Benfica and led the club to five consecutive league titles.

== Career ==
=== Benfica ===
Patão became Benfica's manager in December 2020, taking over from Luís Andrade. In five seasons with the club, she won the Campeonato Nacional Feminino five times consecutively, the Taça de Portugal Feminina once, and the Taça da Liga Feminina three times. In the 2023–24 UEFA Women's Champions League, she led Benfica to the quarterfinals, a first for a Portuguese club.

=== Boston Legacy ===
In June 2025, it was announced that Patão would become the inaugural head coach of the National Women's Soccer League (NWSL) expansion side Boston Legacy FC, who begin play in 2026.

== Honors ==
=== Player ===
1º Dezembro

- Campeonato Nacional (6): 2006–07, 2007–08, 2008–09, 2009–10, 2010–11, 2011–12
- Taça de Portugal (5): 2006–07, 2007–08, 2009–10, 2010–11, 2011–12

CF Benfica

- Campeonato Nacional (2): 2014–15, 2015–16
- Taça de Portugal (2): 2014–15, 2015–16
- Supertaça de Portugal (1): 2015

=== Manager ===
Benfica

- Campeonato Nacional (5): 2020–21, 2021–22, 2022–23, 2023–24, 2024–25
- Taça de Portugal (1): 2023–24
- Taça da Liga (3): 2022–23, 2023–24, 2024–25
- Supertaça de Portugal (2): 2022, 2023
