= Boston Legacy FC =

Women's soccer club in Greater Boston

- Full name: Boston Legacy Football Club
- Nickname: The Swans
- Founded: September 19, 2023; 3 years ago
- Stadium: Centreville Bank Stadium (interim); Pawtucket, Rhode Island; White Stadium (2028); Boston, Massachusetts
- Capacity: 10,500
- Owner: Boston Unity Soccer Partners
- Head coach: Filipa Patão
- League: National Women's Soccer League
- 2026: Regular season: 13th of 16; Playoffs: DNQ
- Website: bostonlegacyfc.com
Home colors	Away colors

Boston Legacy FC is an American professional soccer team based in the Greater Boston area that competes in the National Women's Soccer League (NWSL). Nicknamed "the Swans," Legacy FC joined the league as an expansion team in 2026. Its home ground will be at a renovated White Stadium starting in 2028; during construction, the team will play in the 2027 season at Centreville Bank Stadium in Pawtucket, Rhode Island.

== History ==
=== Establishment ===
Boston's second professional women's soccer club, the Boston Breakers, were founded in 2009, and competed in Women's Professional Soccer, Women's Premier Soccer League Elite, and the early seasons of the National Women's Soccer League. The club folded in 2017 due to a limited fanbase, with reports generally blaming a lack of marketing. Boston Unity Soccer Partners put forward bids during the 2024 and 2026 rounds of National Women's Soccer League expansion – ultimately winning the latter.

The club unveiled its original name, BOS Nation FC, in October 2024 – an anagram of Bostonian, and a play on boss. Their branding was launched with a marketing campaign that sported the tagline, "there are too many balls in this town". While its intent was to highlight the patriarchal nature of sports in Boston, it was criticized by the LGBTQ community as transphobic, and by others for focusing on male athletes as opposed to highlighting Boston's existing and preceding women's sports teams. Days after its branding launch, the club issued a public apology, and immediately discontinued the campaign.

The criticism led to a rebranding, and the club relaunched as Boston Legacy Football Club in March 2025.

On June 25, 2025, the club announced that they had hired Filipa Patão as their inaugural head coach.

Former FC Barcelona Femení recruitment and contract manager Domènec "Domè" Guasch serves as the club's general manager. The club also hired former Brighton & Hove Albion women's player recruitment manager Edward Gallagher as their first director of player recruitment.

=== Inaugural season ===
The team began in the 2026 season, alongside Denver Summit FC, bringing the NWSL to a total of 16 teams. Boston and Denver were the first NWSL expansion teams to assemble rosters from scratch following the league's elimination of expansion drafts.

Legacy FC drew 30,207 fans to its first-ever match — setting a then-league record for largest attendance at a new team’s first home opener — a narrow loss to defending league champions Gotham FC at Gillette Stadium in the Boston suburb of Foxborough.

The club's first-ever goal was scored by Mali international Aïssata Traoré in the third game of the season, a 2-1 loss to Utah Royals. The team lost its first five matches before earning its first point in a draw with North Carolina Courage on April 29. Its first win came against expansion rivals Denver on May 2, coming from behind in stoppage time to win 3-2.

== Club identity ==
The team's crest, designed by Matthew Wolff, was unveiled in June 2025. It features an eight-feathered swan representing the eight original NWSL teams, including the Legacy's predecessor in Boston, the Breakers. The design is also a nod to Romeo and Juliet, two female mute swans that previously resided in the Boston Public Garden. The inaugural primary uniform, dubbed "First Light", is an all-bright green kit with accents in black and "Fire Berry".

The club's colors are "Legacy Green", "Pitch Black", and "Stadium White". The club also uses fuchsia, orange and yellow as secondary colors; these are used in the graphic elements on the black secondary kit.

== Stadium ==
Beginning in 2028, the team will play home matches at a newly renovated White Stadium in Franklin Park, a facility shared with Boston Public Schools athletics, following a multi-year renovation project funded by the team and the city of Boston. White Stadium originally opened in 1949, but had fallen into significant disrepair in recent years, including limited open hours and the entire east side having been condemned and closed off since a fire in the 1990s.

The rebuilt stadium was announced as the first venue in the country to be the simultaneous home to both a major league sports franchise and the athletic program of a public high school. The stadium is planned to be shared with BPS track and soccer, and will include training, sports medicine, and study rooms for the exclusive use of city student-athletes. To avoid wear and tear on its playing surface, gridiron football matches would be prohibited on the field until after the professional soccer season, during the MIAA playoffs and Thanksgiving games.

The city initially planned to commit up to $50 million towards the stadium's renovation, and BUSP pledged $30 million. By 2026, estimates for the stadium revitalization had risen to $325 million, with $135 million committed in public funding from the city, and $190 million in private funding from the team.

The Emerald Necklace Conservancy and a group of local residents sued both the city of Boston and the club over the White Stadium plan, but were denied a preliminary injunction, and the suit was dismissed in April 2025. The plaintiffs' appeal was denied by the Massachusetts Supreme Judicial Court in August 2026, clearing the project to proceed as planned, albeit behind schedule.

=== Temporary stadiums ===
With White Stadium still under construction, the team announced in 2025 that they would play the full 2026 season at Gillette Stadium in Foxborough, Massachusetts, home of the New England Patriots and New England Revolution. Later that year, New England soccer blog The Blazing Musket reported that Legacy FC was, additionally, looking into playing games in Pawtucket, Rhode Island and Hartford, Connecticut in its first season, due to scheduling conflicts at Gillette Stadium including the 2026 FIFA Men's World Cup.

Gillette Stadium ultimately hosted eight Legacy FC home games in 2026, including the club's debut match; the team played their remaining seven home games in 2026, and is scheduled to play all 2027 home games, approximately one hour outside Boston at Centreville Bank Stadium in Pawtucket, Rhode Island, which is a 10,500-capacity soccer-specific stadium and the home of the USL Championship side Rhode Island FC.

=== Training facility ===
In June 2026, the team broke ground on a 30,000-square-foot training facility in Brockton that was scheduled to open by the end of 2026, with an all-seasons bubble dome to be completed in January 2027.

== Ownership ==
Boston Legacy FC are owned by Boston Unity Soccer Partners (BUSP), an all-female ownership group led by Jennifer Epstein, Stephanie Connaughton, Ami Danoff, and Anna Palmer. BUSP's investors include Aly Raisman, Elizabeth Banks, and Tracy and Brad Stevens. In July 2025, WNBA All-Star Aliyah Boston joined the ownership group. Linda Henry, the CEO of The Boston Globe's parent company and the wife of Fenway Sports Group founder John Henry, was briefly an investor in the group but exited before the club's first season.

== Supporters ==
Legacy FC's supporters' group is the Boston Independent Supporters' Association, or Boston ISA. The group includes some former members of the Boston Breakers' former supporters' group, the Armada, and designed and raised a tifo that read "Our Legacy Takes Flight" at the first Legacy FC match in 2026.

== Players and staff ==
=== Current squad ===
As of October 8, 2026

No.	Pos.	Nation	Player
1	GK	USA	Casey Murphy
2	DF	USA	Lilly Reale
3	DF	BRA	Kaká
4	DF	USA	Emerson Elgin
5	MF	DEN	Josefine Hasbo
6	MF	USA	Annie Karich
7	FW	CAN	Amanda Allen
8	FW	USA	Sammy Smith
9	FW	BRA	Amanda Gutierres
10	FW	USA	Ella Stevens
11	MF	USA	Chloe Ricketts
12	FW	CAN	Nichelle Prince
13	FW	UGA	Fauzia Najjemba
14	FW	MLI	Aïssata Traoré
15	MF	USA	Aleigh Gambone
16	DF	COL	Jorelyn Carabalí
18	GK	USA	Laurel Ivory
20	DF	MEX	Nicki Hernández
21	MF	VEN	Bárbara Olivieri
22	FW	NGR	Gift Monday
23	MF	USA	Sarah Schupansky
24	MF	BRA	Laís Araújo
26	MF	ESP	Alba Caño
29	DF	USA	Deja Davis
34	DF	USA	Laurel Ansbrow
53	DF	CAN	Bianca St-Georges
87	GK	JPN	Hannah Stambaugh

==== Out on loan ====
No.	Pos.	Nation	Player
25	MF	USA	Sophia Lowenberg (on loan to Brooklyn FC until December 31, 2026)

=== Former players ===
For details of former players, see Category:Boston Legacy FC players and List of Boston Legacy FC players.

=== Coaching staff ===
As of July 3, 2025.

Position	Staff
Head coach	Filipa Patão
General manager	Domènec Guasch
Technical director	Edward Gallagher

== Team records ==
As of November 21, 2026. Current players in bold. Statistics are updated once a year after the conclusion of the NWSL season.

Most appearances
Player					Appearances				
#	Name	Nat.	Pos.	Legacy career	NWSL	Playoffs	Cup	Other	Total
1	Alba Caño	(Spain)	MF	2026–	30	0	0	0	30
1	Annie Karich	(United States)	MF	2026–	30	0	0	0	30
3	Amanda Gutierres	(Brazil)	FW	2026–	29	0	0	0	29
3	Bárbara Olivieri	(Venezuela)	MF	2026–	29	0	0	0	29
3	Aïssata Traoré	(Mali)	FW	2026–	29	0	0	0	29
6	Nichelle Prince	(Canada)	FW	2026–	28	0	0	0	28
7	Jorelyn Carabalí	(Colombia)	DF	2026–	26	0	0	0	26
7	Aleigh Gambone	(United States)	MF	2026–	26	0	0	0	26
7	Sammy Smith	(United States)	FW	2026–	26	0	0	0	26
7	Bianca St-Georges	(Canada)	DF	2026–	26	0	0	0	26

Top goalscorers
Player					Appearances				
#	Name	Nat.	Pos.	Legacy career	NWSL	Playoffs	Cup	Other	Total
1	Amanda Gutierres	(Brazil)	FW	2026–	11	0	0	0	11
2	Aïssata Traoré	(Mali)	FW	2026–	10	0	0	0	10
3	Alba Caño	(Spain)	MF	2026–	5	0	0	0	5
3	Sammy Smith	(United States)	FW	2026–	5	0	0	0	5
5	Nichelle Prince	(Canada)	FW	2026–	2	0	0	0	2
5	Aleigh Gambone	(United States)	MF	2026–	2	0	0	0	2
5	Bianca St-Georges	(Canada)	DF	2026–	2	0	0	0	2

== Managers ==
As of April 4, 2026

Name	Tenure	Refs
(Portugal) Filipa Patão	June 25, 2025 –	

== See also ==
- Boston Breakers (WUSA)
- List of top-division football clubs in CONCACAF countries
- List of professional sports teams in the United States and Canada
