= Amanda Allen =

Canadian soccer player (born 2005)

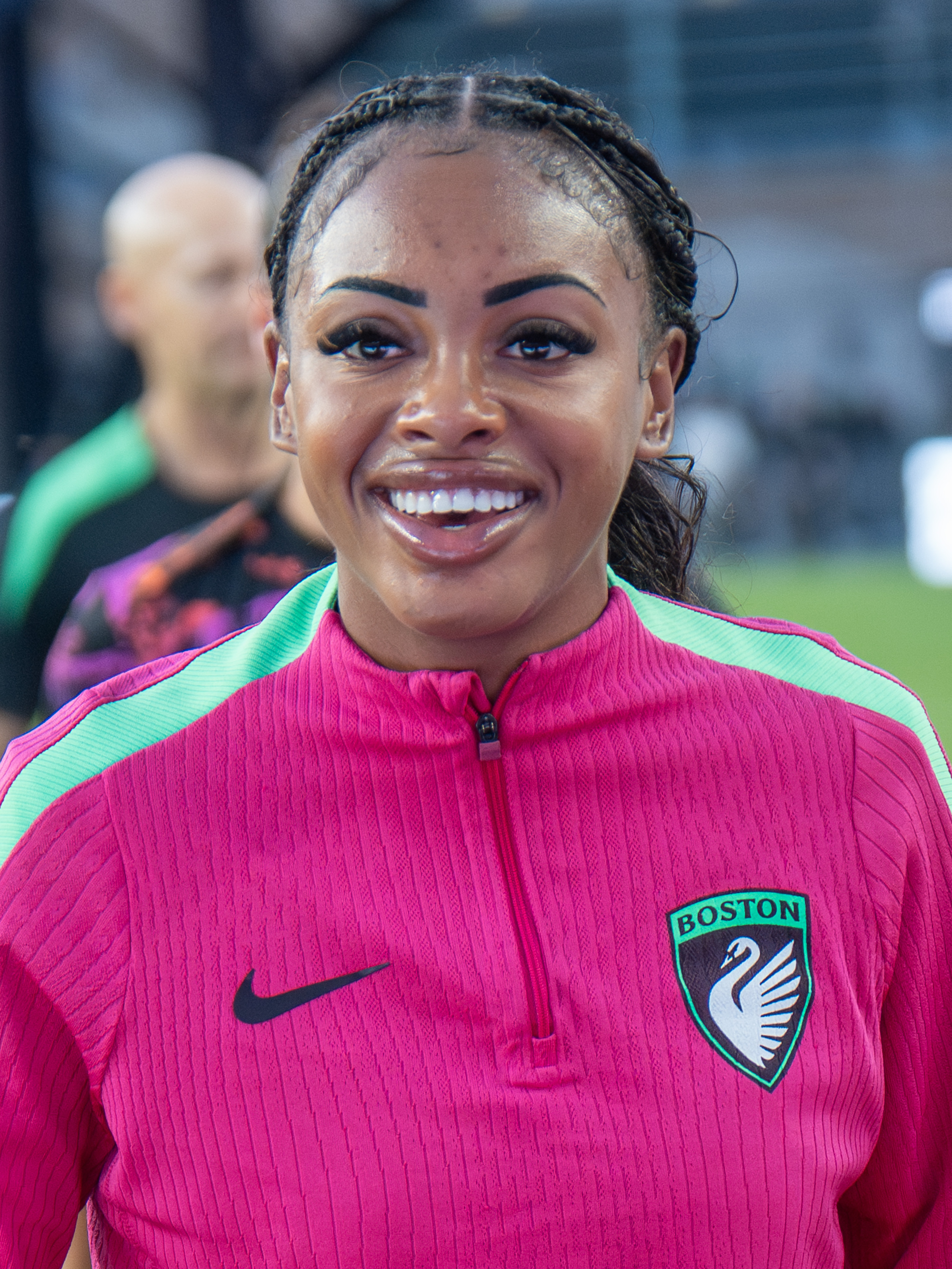
- Allen with the Boston Legacy in 2026

Personal information
- Full name: Amanda Marie Allen
- Date of birth: February 21, 2005 (age 21)
- Place of birth: Mississauga, Ontario, Canada
- Height: 1.63 m (5 ft 4 in)
- Position: Forward

Team information
- Current team: Boston Legacy
- Number: 7

Youth career
- North Mississauga SC
- Woodbridge Strikers
- NDC Ontario

Senior career*
Years	Team	Apps	(Gls)
2022	NDC Ontario	14	(10)
2023–2025	Orlando Pride	11	(0)
2024	→ Lexington SC (loan)	9	(0)
2025	→ Halifax Tides (loan)	11	(1)
2026–	Boston Legacy	15	(0)

International career^{‡}
2021–2022	Canada U17	11	(4)
2023–	Canada U20	10	(4)
2022–	Canada	1	(0)
- * Club domestic league appearances and goals as of 03:19, November 4, 2026 (UTC) ‡ National team caps and goals as of September 11, 2024

Amanda Marie Allen (born February 21, 2005) is a Canadian professional soccer player who plays as a forward for Boston Legacy FC of the National Women's Soccer League and the Canada national team.

== Early life ==
Allen was born in Mississauga, Ontario, to mother Nicola and father Mark, both of whom were born in Kingston, Jamaica. She grew up participating in figure skating, gymnastics and track and field. Allen began playing soccer at age four with North Mississauga SC. She later joined the youth ranks at Woodbridge Strikers before moving to the Canada Soccer NDC Ontario program. She also played for the Team Ontario provincial team. In 2022, she represented Ontario at the 2022 Canada Summer Games.

== Club career ==
=== NDC Ontario ===
In 2022, Allen played with NDC Ontario in the team's inaugural League1 Ontario season. She made 14 regular season appearances and scored 10 goals as NDC Ontario finished runners-up behind Vaughan Azzurri. She made a further two appearances in the playoffs as the team beat Alliance United FC 3–1 in the final to win the championship title. Allen was named a league Third Team All-Star and U18 All-Star.

In November 2022, Allen signed a National Letter of Intent, committing to play college soccer for Syracuse Orange at Syracuse University beginning in August 2023 (however, she ultimately opted to forgo college and turn professional instead).

=== Orlando Pride ===
In March 2023, Allen began training with the Orlando Pride of the National Women's Soccer League during her high school spring break. In April 2023, she signed a three-year contract with the club, choosing to forgo her NCAA eligibility to turn professional instead. She began the team's youngest ever signing and also the youngest debutant, making her first league appearance on May 6, 2023, against Racing Louisville FC at the age of 18 years, two months and 15 days. On March 16, 2024, she recorded her first professional assist, a header to Summer Yates in the Pride's season-opener.

In September 2024, Allen was loaned to Lexington SC of the USL Super League through May 2025. In December 2024, Orlando recalled her from her loan, after she sustained a shoulder injury and placed her on the season-ending injury list.

In July 2025, Allen was loaned to Canadian club Halifax Tides FC of the Northern Super League for the remainder of the 2025 season. She scored her first goal on August 2, in a 1-1 draw against Montreal Roses FC.

=== Boston Legacy ===
On December 26, 2025, NWSL expansion team Boston Legacy FC announced that they had signed Allen to a two-year contract ahead of the Legacy's inaugural season of play.

== International career ==
=== Youth ===
Allen's first international involvement with the Canada Soccer program was in December 2021 when she was invited to an under-17 camp under coach Emma Humphries. The camp included a friendly with Mexico under-17s in which she debuted as a half time substitute. In May 2022, Allen was selected to the roster for the 2022 CONCACAF Women's U-17 Championship. She appeared in all seven games, including five starts, and scored four goals: two in the opening group stage match as Canada beat Dominican Republic 10–0, another in a 4–1 round of 16 win against Honduras and her fourth in a 3–0 third place playoff victory over Panama as Canada claimed the bronze medal. The result also qualified the team for the 2022 FIFA U-17 Women's World Cup. She was named to the roster and started all three group stage games. She scored a penalty in the final match, a 1–1 draw with Tanzania, but Canada were eliminated after finishing third in the group behind Japan and Tanzania.

=== Senior ===
After her performance at the U17 World Cup, Allen was called up to the Canada senior team for the first time, at age 17, for a double header of friendlies against Brazil in November 2022. She made her senior debut on November 11, coming on as a 71st-minute substitute in a 2–1 victory against Brazil.

== Career statistics ==
=== Club ===
As of June 3, 2026

Club	Season	League			Playoffs (Note: Includes NWSL playoffs)		League Cup (Note: Includes NWSL Challenge Cup)		Other (Note: Includes NWSL x Liga MX Femenil Summer Cup)		Total	
Club	Season	Division	Apps	Goals	Apps	Goals	Apps	Goals	Apps	Goals	Apps	Goals
NDC Ontario	2022	League1 Ontario	14	10	2	0	—		—		16	10
Orlando Pride	2023	NWSL	3	0	—		3	0	—		6	0
Orlando Pride	2024	NWSL	8	0	0	0	—		3	0	11	0
Orlando Pride	Total		11	0	0	0	3	0	3	0	17	0
Lexington SC (loan)	2024–25	USL Super League	9	0	—		—		—		9	0
Halifax Tides FC (loan)	2025	Northern Super League	11	1	—		—		—		11	1
Boston Legacy	2026	NWSL	6	0	0	0	0	0	0	0	6	0
Career total			51	11	2	0	3	0	3	0	59	11

=== International ===
As of November 11, 2022

Canada
Year	Apps	Goals
2022	1	0
Total	1	0

== Honours ==
NDC Ontario

- League1 Ontario championship: 2022

Orlando Pride

- NWSL Shield: 2024

International

- CONCACAF Women's U-17 Championship third place: 2022
