= White Stadium =

Sports venue in Boston, Massachusetts

- Location within Massachusetts Location within the United States
- Interactive map of White Stadium
- Full name: George R. White Memorial Stadium
- Address: 450 Walnut Avenue; Boston, Massachusetts; United States
- Coordinates: 42°18′35.02″N 71°5′45.39″W
- Owner: Boston Public Schools
- Capacity: 10,519
- Public transit: Orange Line at Green; Bus; Routes 16, 22, 29, 42, 44
- Parking: 0

Construction
- Opened: 1949
- Rebuilt: 2025–2027
- Cost: $1 million (original 1949 cost); $325 million (2027 renovation cost)

Tenants
- Boston Public Schools athletics (1949-2024; 2027-future); Boston Legacy FC (NWSL) (2028-future)

White Stadium, formally the George R. White Memorial Stadium, is a 10,519-seat stadium in Franklin Park, Boston, Massachusetts. Originally constructed between 1947 and 1949 for the use of Boston Public Schools athletics, the stadium is currently closed and undergoing a renovation that will turn it into an 10,500-seat venue shared with Boston Legacy FC of the National Women's Soccer League.

== History ==
Financed by the George Robert White fund, the cost was originally estimated to be between $350,000 to $450,000. However, the final amount ballooned to $1,000,000 (equivalent to $14,000,000 in 2025), a figure that city clerk and former acting mayor John Hynes blamed on Mayor James Michael Curley.

Following two days of rain postponements, the stadium opened with four football games on September 30, 1949, played by the teams from Roslindale, Charlestown, East Boston, Brandeis Vocational, Hyde Park, Brighton, South Boston and Jamaica Plain high schools. The English–Latin Thanksgiving football game was played at White Stadium beginning in 1950, drawing an estimated 500,000 TV viewers, and track and field teams from as many as 14 BPS schools used White Stadium as their home facility in subsequent years.

In 1970, a proposal was made to enlarge the stadium to 50,000 seats for a potential home for the New England Patriots, though the Patriots ultimately chose to build Foxboro Stadium instead.

In the latter half of the 20th century, interest in high school football waned considerably, and games at White Stadium were marred by low attendance and violent incidents particularly as the city faced unrest around the time of the Boston busing crisis. By the 1980s, White Stadium had deteriorated as maintenance was neglected and improvements were deferred. The scoreboard had been rendered unusable due to vandalism, and the locker rooms lacked working showers and toilets.

A $4.2 million renovation project concluded in 1990, outfitting the stadium with new and updated athletic facilities and bleachers, but a fire in the 1990s led to the entire eastside grandstand to be condemned and permanently closed off. In its later years, White Stadium was open only intermittently, and spectators were only permitted to use the west grandstand's bleacher areas, due to its interior and concourse having fallen into deep disrepair and lacking running water.

In 2009, with the stadium again in poor condition with low attendances, then-Mayor Thomas Menino tried to organize a renovation project funded by Northeastern University to move Huskies football to the stadium, but this was abandoned when the university shut its football program later that year. Businessman John Fish lobbied for a $45 million renovation and expansion plan starting in 2013, but the project was shelved by then-Mayor Marty Walsh, citing budget concerns. White Stadium was proposed to be renovated and used as a venue for equestrian events as part of Boston's bid for the 2024 Summer Olympics, though this plan was also shelved when the Olympic bid was dropped.

=== Renovation ===
In 2023, the city of Boston announced that the stadium would undergo a $30 million renovation to prepare for the arrival of an expansion team in the National Women's Soccer League, set to start play in 2026. The owners of the team, which was eventually christened Boston Legacy FC, were the only group to respond to the city's RFP for a partner to renovate the stadium.

The renovation would include additional seats to bring capacity to 11,000 in order to meet the league's minimum standards, as well as new facilities for Boston Public Schools athletics including new locker rooms, sports-medicine facilities, study spaces, and the replacement of the unmaintained, six-lane track with a new eight-lane track at regulation size. The renovated stadium will also include water fountains and restrooms for the public, accessible from the park outside the stadium. The project, championed by Mayor Michelle Wu, is a public-private partnership, in which Boston Public Schools would retain ownership and scheduling priority, leasing the stadium to Boston Legacy for a maximum of 20 games and 20 practices per year.

Some neighborhood organizations and the Emerald Necklace Conservancy opposed the renovation, and the project was repeatedly criticized during the 2025 Boston mayoral election by candidate Josh Kraft as expensive, unpopular, and detrimental to communities living near the stadium. Kraft, whose family's New England Revolution men's soccer team was attempting to build a stadium in nearby Everett at the time, ultimately dropped out of the race after finishing a distant second to Wu in the preliminary election, and the Revolution filed an Amicus brief in support of the White Stadium project in 2026.

In February 2024, the Emerald Necklace Conservancy and a group of local residents filed a lawsuit claiming that the renovation was illegal, but the plaintiffs' claims were denied at the preliminary-injunction stage, during pretrial proceedings, at trial, and on appeal to the Massachusetts Supreme Judicial Court. The August 2026 ruling cleared the project to proceed as planned, albeit with delays that pushed the planned re-opening of the stadium to 2027 and Boston Legacy FC's first game there to 2028.

Other organizations, including the Franklin Park Coalition and Boston Preservation Alliance, supported the plan once the city addressed its concerns. A 2024 survey commissioned by the Franklin Park Coalition and a 2025 poll by Emerson College Polling found that a majority of Boston residents polled supported the renovation plans.

Demolition work for the project was completed by mid-2025. The final structural beam was placed in late 2026, by which point cost estimates for the project had risen to $325 million, with $135 million committed in public funding from the City of Boston and $190 million in private funding from the owners of Boston Legacy FC.

== Design ==
White Stadium sits at the northern corner of Franklin Park near Egleston Square, at the meeting point of the Roxbury and Jamaica Plain neighborhoods and nearby the Dorchester and Mattapan neighborhoods on the other side of the park. The site was chosen to use Franklin Park's natural landscape to protect attendees from the elements while orienting the playing field in the sun. The stadium, designed by the firm Desmond & Lord, was originally constructed to hold 10,519 patrons. The structure consisted of a pair of twin clamshell bleacher sections, mirrored on either side of the playing field and track; the design was said to be borrowed from a stadium at Brown University while the locker rooms were inspired by those at Yankee Stadium.

The Boston Preservation Alliance called White Stadium "a rare example of Streamline Art Deco architecture in New England with a hint of Bauhaus influence".

The 2020s renovation project demolished the condemned, fire-damaged east grandstand and gutted the west grandstand, while preserving the west grandstand's original Art Deco clamshell wall, the ticketing booths, and entry gates on the north side to incorporate them into the new stadium design. The track and field were torn up and rebuilt from scratch to install new drainage and expand the track to an eight-lane regulation size. The project will add a restaurant and public gathering space to the south end of the site, while the rebuilt grandstands on either side of the field will add canopies above the seating areas; the rebuilt stadium will include movable bleachers that can be added on top of the track to bring spectators closer to the field during soccer and football games, and retracted when the track is in use.

== Tenants ==
The stadium was originally built for use by public school teams in Boston, most notably football; the English–Latin football rivalry game drew a sellout crowd and a half-million TV viewers when it was played at White in 1950. In track and field, 14 Boston schools were competing at White following the stadium's opening. Franklin Park's cross country course encircles the stadium, and is used as a home course by local high schools and universities as well as for MIAA statewide meets.

By the time the stadium rebuild project began in 2024, high school football in Boston was at a nadir due to waning interest and poor infrastructure; only Boston Latin School and Boston Latin Academy were using White Stadium as a home field. The English–Latin game had long been played at Harvard Stadium, while other notable Thanksgiving rivalry games that had historically been played at White were moved elsewhere, such as the 100th East Boston-South Boston game moving due to poor field conditions.

Boston Legacy FC, of the National Women's Soccer League, plan to move in to White Stadium in 2028 after the renovation project concludes. The team provided the majority of the funding for the renovation project, including money to build professional-level infrastructure in the rebuilt west grandstand. Legacy FC's lease with the city will permit them to use the stadium for up to 20 home games per year, while BPS athletics will use it on all other days. Football games will be prohibited at the rebuilt stadium until after the conclusion of Legacy FC's season, due to risk of field damage, although this is not planned to conflict with the football teams' Thanksgiving or postseason games. No such restrictions have been placed on high school soccer or track.

== Other events ==
A rally by the Black Panther Party was held in the park on July 27, 1969, at 2 p.m.

Uptown in the Park, a three part series of funk/soul and jazz concerts to benefit Elma Lewis School of Fine Arts, was held in the park in 1974. On July 7, Sly and the Family Stone along with Tower of Power, Hues Corporation, Donald Byrd and the Blackbyrds, and Richard Pryor performed. Funkadelic performed on August 25 along with The Voices of East Harlem, The Isley Brothers, Gil Scott-Heron, Mandrill, and Bar-Kays. A September 2 concert featuring the Ohio Players, Staple Singers, Bobbi Humphrey, and Bobby Womack was canceled.

The 1992 IAAF World Cross Country Championships were held at Franklin Park; the course, covered in mud, ice and snow from an unusually late winter storm, concluded with its final stretch and finish line running down the center of White Stadium. The women's race was won by hometown runner Lynn Jennings, who ran cross country at Franklin Park in her high school years.

White Stadium has historically served as the start and finish line for the annual Boston Half, previously known as the B.A.A. Half Marathon.
