= Aïssata Traoré =

Malian footballer (born 1997)

- Traoré with Boston Legacy FC in 2026

Personal information
- Date of birth: 9 September 1997 (age 29)
- Place of birth: Bamako, Mali
- Height: 1.72 m (5 ft 8 in)
- Position: Forward

Team information
- Current team: Boston Legacy
- Number: 14

Senior career*
Years	Team	Apps	(Gls)
- Super Lionnes d’Hamdallaye
2019	Beşiktaş	9	(8)
2019–2024	Guingamp	84	(8)
2024–2025	Fleury	20	(9)
2026–	Boston Legacy	29	(10)
2025	→ Fleury (loan)	9	(2)

International career^{‡}
	Mali	14	(6)
- * Club domestic league appearances and goals as of 02:18, 8 November 2026 (UTC) ‡ National team caps and goals as of 30 November 2018

Aïssata Traoré (born 9 September 1997) is a Malian professional footballer who plays as a forward for Boston Legacy FC of the National Women's Soccer League (NWSL) and the Mali national team.

== Club career ==
Traoré played for AS Super Lionness in her country before she was loaned out to the Istanbul-based club Beşiktaş J.K. for the second half of the 2018-19 Turkish First League season. She won the championship with her team.

Traoré signed with FC Fleury 91 in July 2024. In her first season with the club, she scored nine goals and notched four assists in 20 games.

On 10 July 2025, she signed with American club Boston Legacy FC, becoming the first Malian to sign in the National Women's Soccer League. With Boston starting play in 2026 as an expansion club, Traoré was loaned back to Fleury for the first half of the 2025–26 season. On 28 March 2026, Traoré scored the first goal in Legacy FC club history, with an assist from Amanda Gutierres, in the 71st minute of a 2–1 loss to the Utah Royals at Gillette Stadium.

== International career ==
She was called up to the Mali national team in 2018, and took part at the 2018 Africa Cup of Nations held in Ghana. She played in five matches and scored one goal, helping her team reach the semifinals.

International goals
No.	Date	Venue	Opponent	Score	Result	Competition
1.	17 November 2018	Accra Sports Stadium, Accra, Ghana	Cameroon	1–0	1–2	2018 Africa Women Cup of Nations
2.	7 June 2026	Stade du 4 Août, Ouagadougou, Burkina Faso	Burkina Faso	2–2	2–2	Friendly
3.	8 October 2026	Stade de Kégué, Lomé, Togo	Benin	1–3	1–3	2028 CAF Women's Olympic qualifying tournament
4.	13 October 2026	26 March Stadium, Bamako, Mali	Benin	4–2	6–2	2028 CAF Women's Olympic qualifying tournament

== Career statistics ==
As of match played 12 May 2019

Club	Season	League			Continental		National		Total	
Club	Season	Division	Apps	Goals	Apps	Goals	Apps	Goals	Apps	Goals
Beşiktaş J.K.	2018–19	Turkish First League	9	8	–	–	5	1	14	9
Beşiktaş J.K.	Total		9	8	-	-	5	1	14	9

== Honours ==
Beşiktaş J.K.

- Turkish Women's First Football League: 2018–19
