= Santa Cruz de Monte Castelo =

Coordinates: 22°57′S 53°19′W

- Municipality
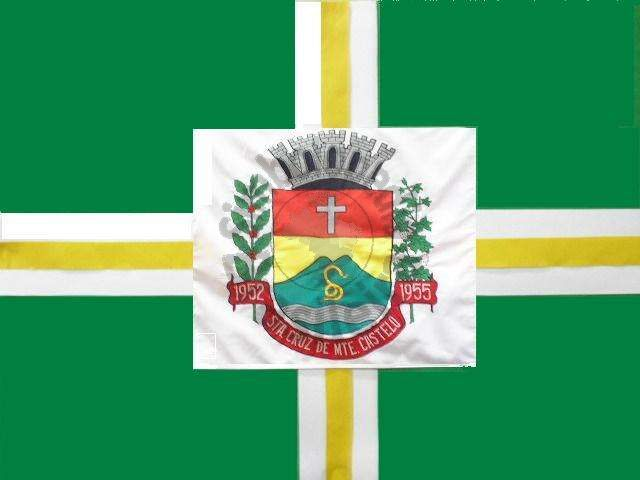
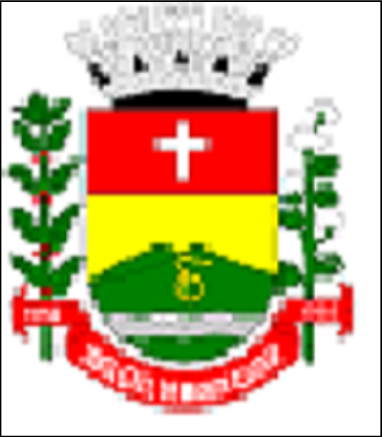
- Flag Coat of arms
- Interactive map of Santa Cruz de Monte Castelo
- Country: Brazil
- Region: Southern
- State: Paraná
- Mesoregion: Noroeste Paranaense

Population (2020)
  - Total: 7,751
- Time zone: UTC−3 (BRT)

Santa Cruz de Monte Castelo is a municipality in the state of Paraná in the Southern Region of Brazil.

== See also ==
- List of municipalities in Paraná
