= Amanda Gutierres =

Brazilian footballer (born 2001)

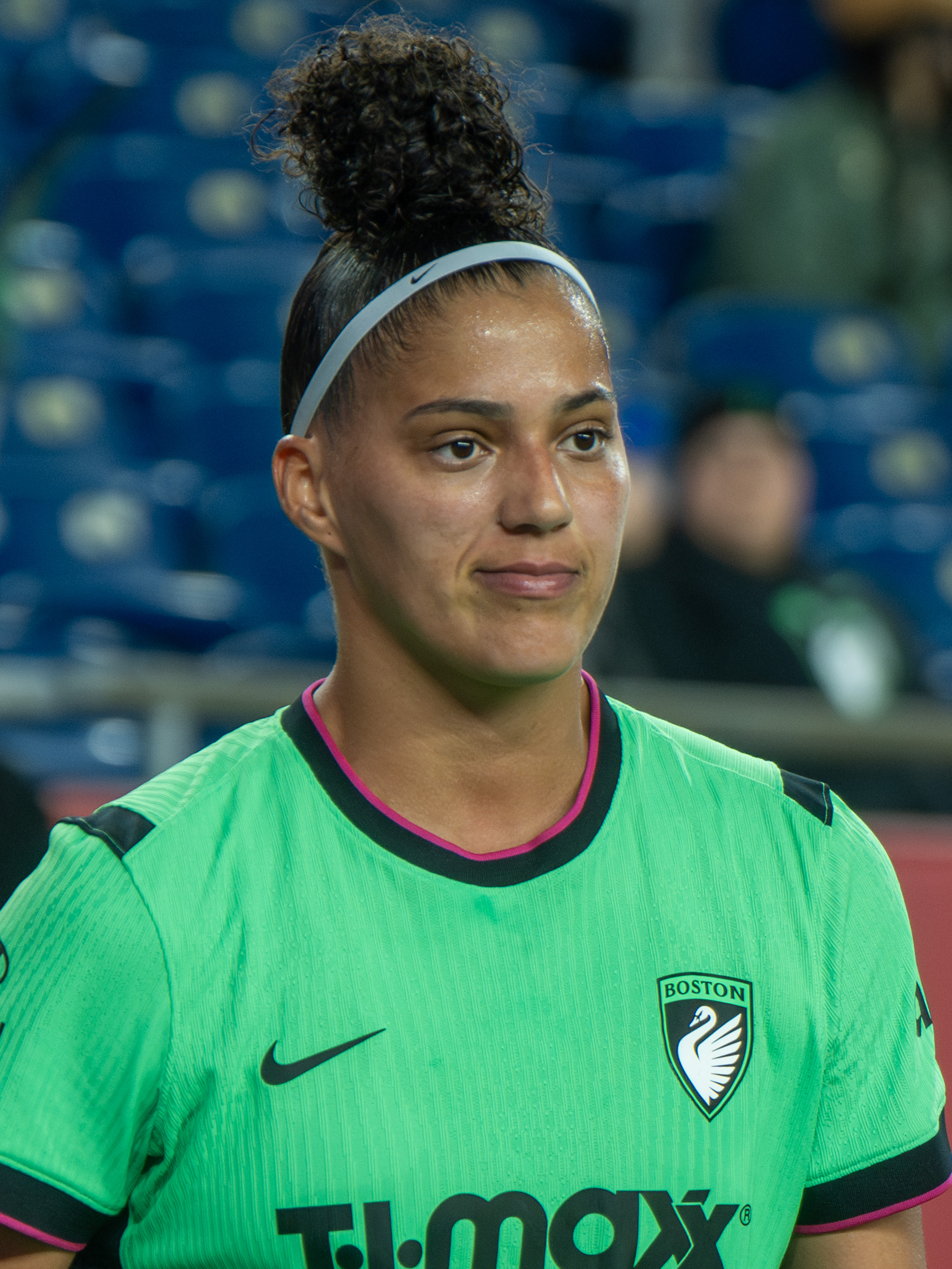
- Gutierres with Boston Legacy FC in 2026

Personal information
- Full name: Amanda Gutierres dos Santos
- Date of birth: 18 March 2001 (age 25)
- Place of birth: Santa Cruz do Monte Castelo, Brazil
- Height: 1.75 m (5 ft 9 in)
- Position: Striker

Team information
- Current team: Boston Legacy
- Number: 9

Youth career
- 2016–2018: Vila Guarani
- 2017: → União Suzano (loan)
- 2018–2019: Santos

Senior career*
Years	Team	Apps	(Gls)
2018	Embu das Artes		
2018	Foz Cataratas	3	(0)
2019–2021	Santos	34	(5)
2022	Bordeaux	13	(0)
2023–2025	Palmeiras	67	(61)
2026–	Boston Legacy	29	(11)

International career^{‡}
2018	Brazil U17	3	(1)
2024–	Brazil	13	(9)
Medal record
Women's football
Representing Brazil
Copa América Femenina
Gold medal – first place	2025 Ecuador
- * Club domestic league appearances and goals as of 02:13, 8 November 2026 (UTC) ‡ National team caps and goals as of 19:15, 7 January 2026 (UTC)

Amanda Gutierres dos Santos (born 18 March 2001) is a Brazilian professional footballer who plays as a striker for Boston Legacy FC of the National Women's Soccer League (NWSL) and the Brazil national team. She previously played for Palmeiras where she was the Brasileirão Feminino's top scorer three years running.

Gutierres made her senior debut for Brazil in 2024. She was the top scorer in their victory at the 2025 Copa América Femenina.

== Club career ==
=== Career beginnings ===
Gutierres was born in Santa Cruz do Monte Castelo, Paraná, and moved to the São Paulo state to start her career in 2016. After starting it out at Clube Escola Vila Guarani, she was the top scorer of the Campeonato Paulista de Futebol Feminino under-17 with União Suzano before making her senior debut with Embu das Artes in 2018.

=== Foz Cataratas ===
Amanda Gutierres made her league debut against AAD Vitória das Tabocas on 26 June 2018.

=== Santos ===
In 2018, after a brief period at Foz Cataratas, Gutierres moved to Santos. Initially assigned to the under-18 squad, she made her first team debut in the following year. She scored her first league goal against São Francisco BA on 27 March 2019, scoring in the 61st minute.

On 20 December 2021, Gutierres opted to leave Santos after not renewing her contract.

=== Bordeaux ===
The following 11 January, she was announced at French club Bordeaux. Amanda Gutierres made her league debut against Stade de Reims on 22 January 2022.

=== Palmeiras ===
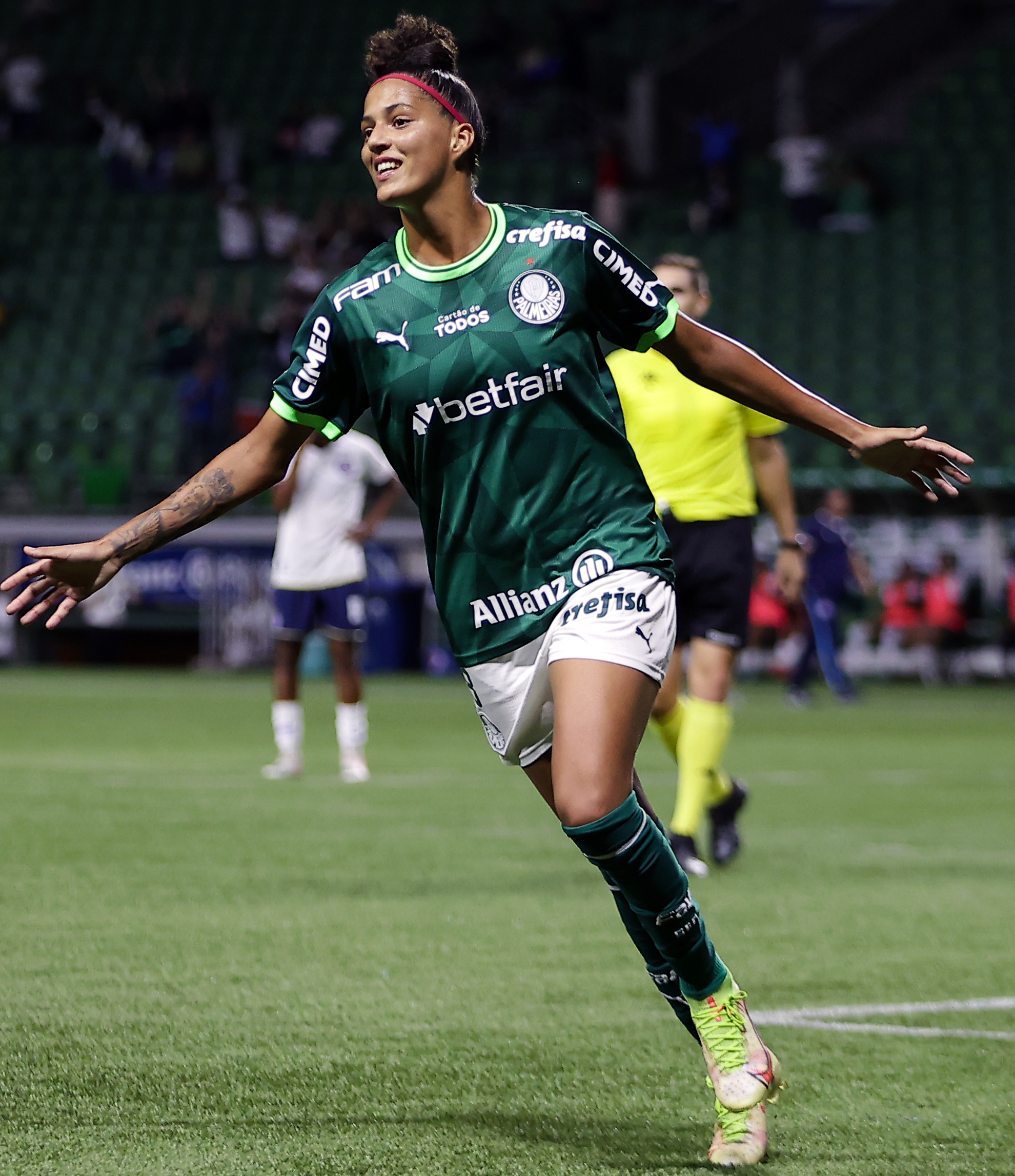
Amanda Gutierres with Palmeiras in 2023

On 30 November 2022, Amanda Gutierres joined Palmeiras ahead of the upcoming season. She made her league debut against Real Ariquemes on 26 February 2023. Amanda scored her first league goal against Avaí on 12 March 2023, scoring in the 75th minute. She scored a hattrick against Atlético Mineiro on 23 April 2023. Amanda scored all 4 goals against Ferroviária on 20 May 2023.

=== Boston Legacy ===
On 3 October 2025, Boston Legacy FC of the National Women's Soccer League announced the signing of Gutierres to play from 2026 (their inaugural season) through 2029.

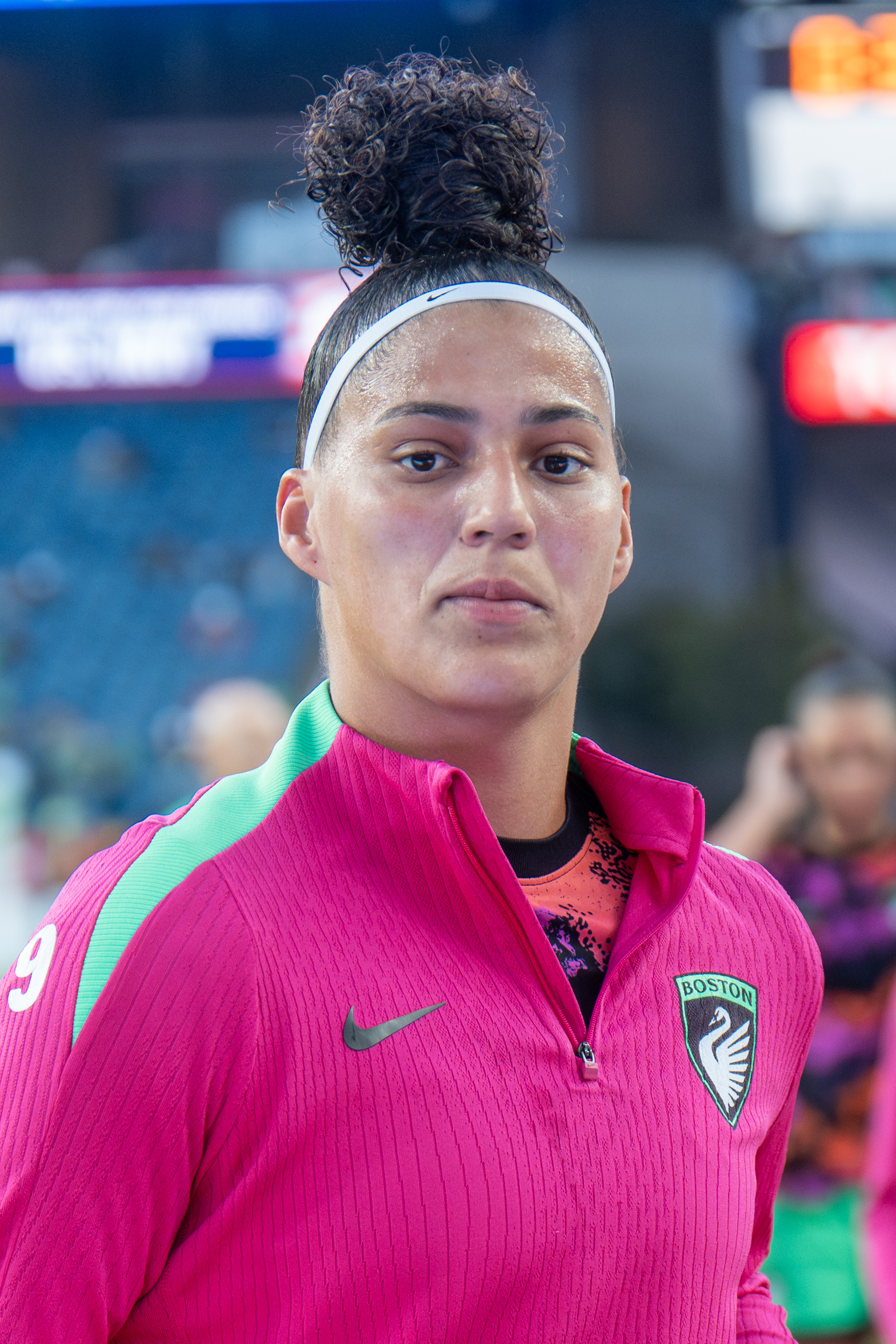
Amanda Gutierres with Boston Legacy FC in 2026

== International career ==
As of match played 2 August 2025

Appearances and goals by national team and year
National team	Year	Apps	Goals
Brazil	2024	4	2
Brazil	2025	9	7
Total		13	9

=== International goals ===
No.	Date	Venue	Opponent	Score	Result	Competition
1.	28 November 2024	Suncorp Stadium, Brisbane, Australia	Australia	1–0	3–1	Friendly
2.	28 November 2024	Suncorp Stadium, Brisbane, Australia	Australia	2–0	3–1	Friendly
3.	8 April 2025	PayPal Park, San Jose, United States	United States	2–1	2–1	Friendly
4.	13 July 2025	Estadio Gonzalo Pozo Ripalda, Quito, Ecuador	Venezuela	1–0	2–0	2025 Copa América Femenina
5.	16 July 2025	Estadio Gonzalo Pozo Ripalda, Quito, Ecuador	Bolivia	6–0	6–0	2025 Copa América Femenina
6.	22 July 2025	Estadio Gonzalo Pozo Ripalda, Quito, Ecuador	Paraguay	3–0	4–1	2025 Copa América Femenina
7.	29 July 2025	Estadio Rodrigo Paz Delgado, Quito, Ecuador	Uruguay	1–0	5–1	2025 Copa América Femenina
8.	29 July 2025	Estadio Rodrigo Paz Delgado, Quito, Ecuador	Uruguay	4–1	5–1	2025 Copa América Femenina
9.	2 August 2025	Estadio Rodrigo Paz Delgado, Quito, Ecuador	Colombia	2–2	4–4	2025 Copa América Femenina

== Honours ==
Santos

- Copa Paulista de Futebol Feminino: 2020

Palmeiras

- Campeonato Paulista de Futebol Feminino: 2024,2025
- Copa do Brasil de Futebol Feminino: 2025
- Brasil Ladies Cup: 2025

Brazil women's national football team

- Copa America Femenina: 2025

Individual

- Campeonato Brasileiro Feminino Série A1 top scorer: 2023, 2024, 2025
- Bola de Prata: 2024, 2025
- Campeonato Brasileiro Série A1 Team of the Year: 2025
