= Aleigh Gambone =

American soccer player (born 2000)

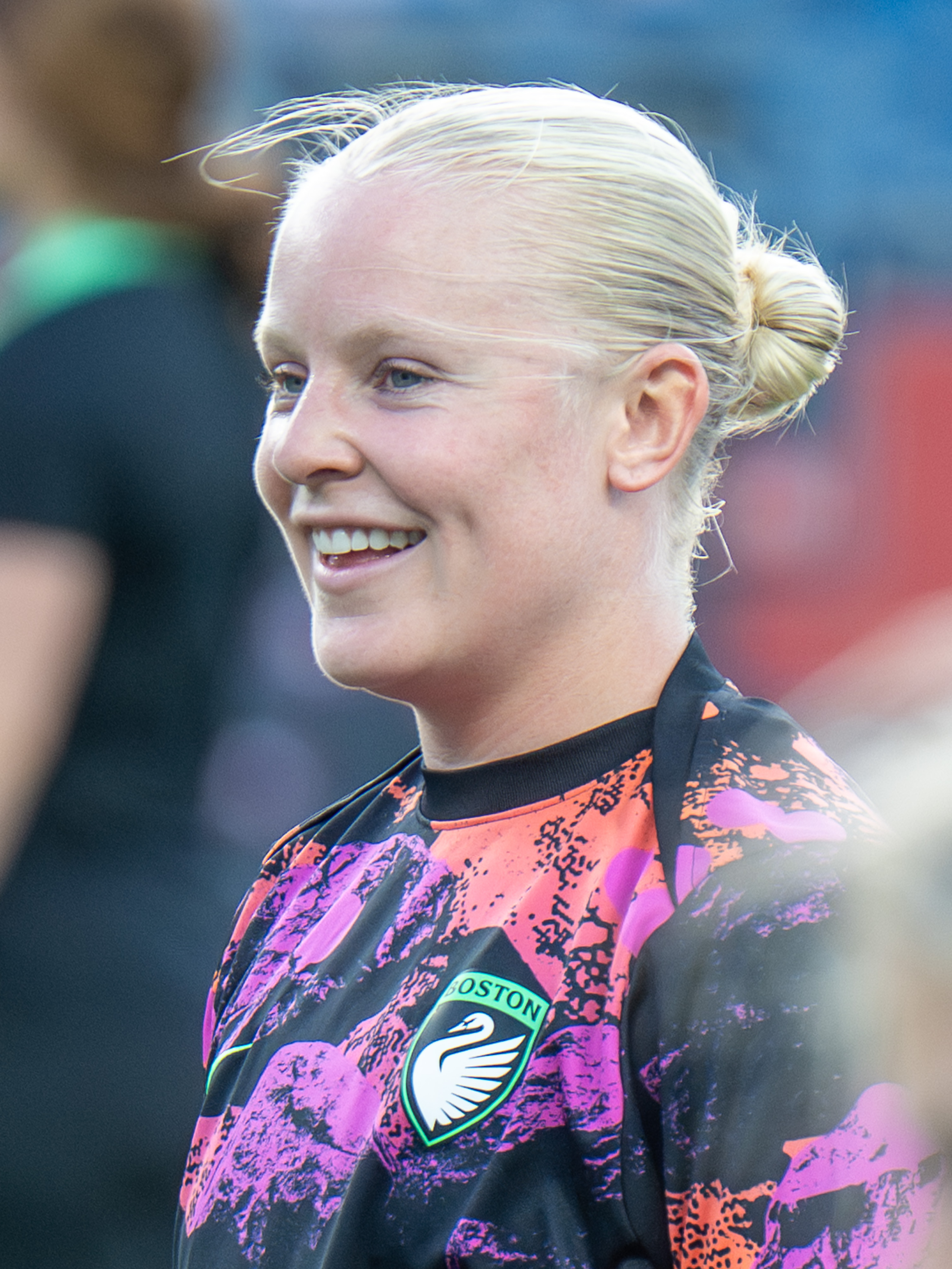
- Gambone with Boston Legacy FC in 2026

Personal information
- Full name: Aleigh Kathryn Gambone
- Date of birth: October 9, 2000 (age 26)
- Place of birth: Clifton, Virginia, United States
- Height: 5 ft 3 in (1.60 m)
- Positions: Midfielder; forward

Team information
- Current team: Boston Legacy
- Number: 15

Youth career
- 2006–2015: Southwestern Youth Association
- 2015–2019: McLean Soccer

College career
Years	Team	Apps	(Gls)
2019–2022	North Carolina Tar Heels	85	(2)

Senior career*
Years	Team	Apps	(Gls)
2023	Fortuna Hjørring	5	(0)
2023–2025	Glasgow City	36	(9)
2026–	Boston Legacy	26	(2)
2025	→ 1. FC Nürnberg (loan)	14	(0)

International career
2017–2018	United States U-18		
2017–2018	United States U-19		
- * Club domestic league appearances and goals as of 03:25, November 4, 2026 (UTC)

Aleigh Kathryn Gambone (born October 9, 2000) is an American professional soccer player who plays as a midfielder or forward for Boston Legacy FC of the National Women's Soccer League (NWSL). She played college soccer for the North Carolina Tar Heels. She began her professional career with Danish club Fortuna Hjørring in 2023, before moving to Glasgow City in Scotland, where she was named Player of the Year by her teammates and coaches in 2025.

== Early life ==
Gambone was born and raised in Clifton, Virginia, one of four children born to Michael and Robbi Gambone. She began playing organized soccer with the Southwestern Youth Association at age five before moving to McLean Soccer at 14. There she captained her team to the ECNL under-18/19 national title in 2018, earning ECNL All-American honors twice and the conference player of the year award in 2019. She played both soccer and basketball at Centreville High School, receiving TopDrawerSoccer All-American recognition in soccer and The Washington Post All-Met honors in basketball. She committed to play college soccer at the University of North Carolina when she was a sophomore. She was ranked by TopDrawerSoccer as the No. 56 recruit of the 2019 class, part of North Carolina's fourth-ranked cohort.

== College career ==
Gambone made a career-high 7 starts (out of 21 appearances), all of them early in the season, in her freshman year with the North Carolina Tar Heels in 2019. She played 24 minutes in the 2019 NCAA tournament title game against Stanford, losing on penalties after a scoreless draw. In her sophomore season in 2020 (partly played in 2021 due to the COVID-19 pandemic, she played in all 20 games and made two starts, both in the NCAA tournament including the semifinal loss to Santa Clara. She played in all 18 games, with four starts, in her junior season in 2021. In 2022, she scored her first career goal in the season opener against Tennessee. In the NCAA tournament semifinals, she scored the opening goal against Florida State, helping the Tar Heels to the final, where she played 44 minutes in the overtime loss to UCLA. She had the two goals in 26 games (1 start) in her senior season.

== Club career ==
=== Fortuna Hjørring and Glasgow City ===
After going unselected in the 2023 NWSL Draft, Gambone began her professional career with Danish Women's League club Fortuna Hjørring, signing alongside North Carolina teammate Libby Moore in February 2023. She made only six appearances in all competitions before joining Glasgow City in the summer of 2023, signing a two-year contract with the Scottish Women's Premier League champions. She made her club debut on September 6, 2023, in a 2–0 UEFA Women's Champions League qualifying round win over Irish champions Shelbourne and former college teammate Maggie Pierce. She scored 6 goals and added 3 assists in 30 appearances in all competitions in her debut season. In her second season, she was voted the club's Player of the Year by both her coaches and her teammates after scoring 4 goals and providing 7 assists in 31 league games. She was also named in the PFA Scotland Team of the Year after helping her side to runner-up finishes in the league and the Women's Scottish Cup.

=== Boston Legacy ===
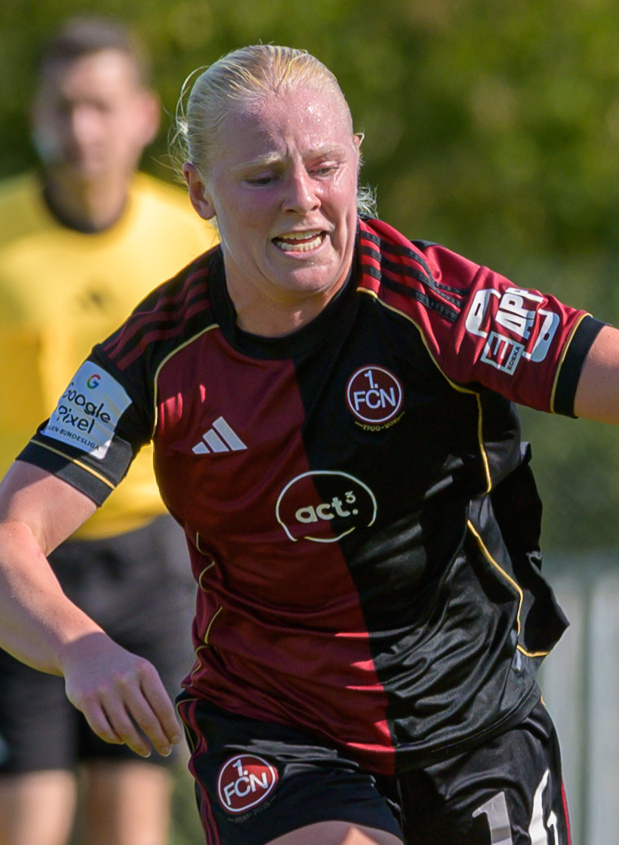
Gambone playing for 1. FC Nürnberg in 2025

National Women's Soccer League (NWSL) expansion team Boston Legacy announced on August 11, 2025, that the club had signed Gambone on a two-and-a-half-year contract. Before the Legacy began play, she finished the year on loan with Frauen-Bundesliga club 1. FC Nürnberg, making 14 league appearances.

Gambone made her NWSL debut in the Legacy's inaugural game on March 14, 2026, starting and playing 70 minutes in a 1–0 defeat to reigning champions Gotham FC. On May 12, she scored her first NWSL goal to equalize in an eventual 2–1 win over the Orlando Pride.

== International career ==
Gambone was called up to train and play friendlies with the United States youth national team at the under-18 and under-19 levels in 2017 and 2018.

== Honors and awards ==
North Carolina Tar Heels

- Atlantic Coast Conference: 2019, 2022
- ACC tournament: 2019
- NCAA tournament runner-up: 2019, 2022

Glasgow City

- Scottish Women's Premier League: runner-up: 2024–25
- Women's Scottish Cup runner-up: 2024–25

Individual

- PFA Scotland Team of the Year: 2024–25
- Glasgow City Players' Player of the Year: 2024–25
- Glasgow City Coaches' Player of the Year: 2024–25
