= Hannah Stambaugh =

Japanese footballer (born 1998)

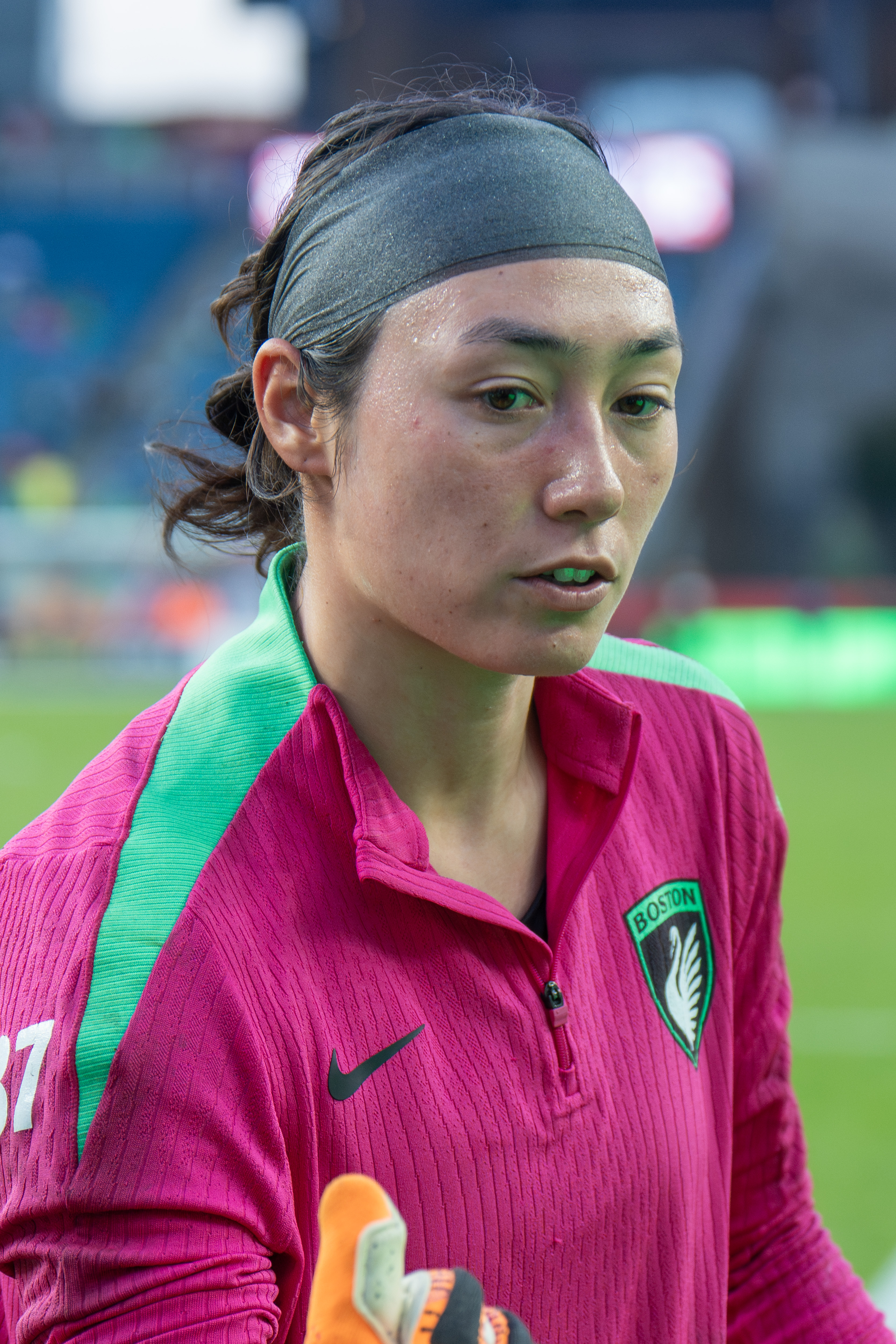
- Stambaugh with the Boston Legacy in 2026

Personal information
- Date of birth: 24 December 1998 (age 27)
- Place of birth: Tokyo Prefecture, Japan
- Height: 1.75 m (5 ft 9 in)
- Position: Goalkeeper

Team information
- Current team: Boston Legacy
- Number: 87

Senior career*
Years	Team	Apps	(Gls)
2016–2020	INAC Kobe Leonessa	21	(0)
2021–2024	Omiya Ardija Ventus	8	(0)
2024–2025	Angel City	0	(0)
2026–	Boston Legacy	0	(0)
- * Club domestic league appearances and goals as of 22:00, 11 November 2025 (UTC)

Hannah Stambaugh (スタンボー 華, Sutambō Hana; born 24 December 1998) is a Japanese professional footballer who plays as a goalkeeper for Boston Legacy FC of the National Women's Soccer League (NWSL).

== Youth career ==
Stambaugh joined JFA Academy Fukushima in 2011. She was selected as a candidate for the U-16 Japan Women's National Team in 2013 and was also a candidate for the U-19 Japan Women's National Team 2 years later. In April 2016, she was approved by the Japan Football Association as a 2016 Women's Specially Designated Player. She also began playing for INAC Kobe Leonessa.

== Club career ==
In 2017, she joined INAC Kobe Leonessa. Stambaugh made five appearances during the 2018 FIFA U-20 Women's World Cup, helping the Japanese team win their first title. In November 2020, Stambaugh attended the training camp for the Japan Women's National Team for the first time. She was also selected for an international friendly match before the 2020 Tokyo Olympics but became injured during practice and was dropped.

In January 2021, Stambaugh transferred to Omiya Ardija Ventus. Stambaugh made her WE League debut on 20 September 2021.

On January 24, 2024, NWSL club Angel City FC announced they had acquired Stambaugh in exchange from Omiya Ardija Ventus for a $10,000 transfer fee. Stambaugh made her debut for Angel City on August 18, 2024, subbing in for DiDi Haračić in the 29th minute of a friendly against FC Juárez. On December 4, 2024, after the conclusion of the 2024 season, Stambaugh signed a one-year contract extension with Angel City. After failing to make any competitive appearances for the club, Stambaugh departed from Angel City upon the expiration of her contract.

In December 2025, Stambaugh signed a two-year contract with Boston Legacy FC ahead of the club's inaugural season in the NWSL.

== Personal life ==
Stambaugh was born in Japan to an American father and Japanese mother.

== Career statistics ==
=== Club ===
Appearances and goals by club, season and competition
Club	Season	League			League cup		Open cup		Total	
Club	Season	Division	Apps	Goals	Apps	Goals	Apps	Goals	Apps	Goals
JFA Academy Fukushima	2011	Nadeshiko Challenge League	1	0	—		0	0	1	0
JFA Academy Fukushima	2012	Nadeshiko Challenge League	2	0	—		0	0	2	0
JFA Academy Fukushima	2013	Nadeshiko Challenge League	1	0	—		0	0	1	0
JFA Academy Fukushima	2014	Nadeshiko Challenge League	5	0	—		0	0	5	0
JFA Academy Fukushima	2015	Nadeshiko Challenge League	9	0	—		0	0	9	0
JFA Academy Fukushima	2016	Nadeshiko Challenge League	16	0	—		2	0	18	0
JFA Academy Fukushima	Total		34	0	0	0	2	0	36	0
INAC Kobe Leonessa	2016	Nadeshiko League	0	0	0	0	—		0	0
INAC Kobe Leonessa	2017	Nadeshiko League	0	0	0	0	0	0	0	0
INAC Kobe Leonessa	2018	Nadeshiko League	2	0	0	0	0	0	2	0
INAC Kobe Leonessa	2019	Nadeshiko League	0	0	1	0	0	0	1	0
INAC Kobe Leonessa	2020	Nadeshiko League	18	0	—		0	0	18	0
INAC Kobe Leonessa	Total		20	0	1	0	0	0	21	0
Omiya Ardija Ventus	2021–22	WE League	4	0	—		0	0	4	0
Omiya Ardija Ventus	2022–23	WE League	0	0	2	0	2	0	4	0
Omiya Ardija Ventus	Total		4	0	2	0	2	0	8	0
Angel City FC	2024	NWSL	0	0	—		—		0	0
Angel City FC	2025	NWSL	0	0	—		—		0	0
Career total			58	0	3	0	4	0	65	0
