= Alba Caño =

Spanish footballer (born 2003)

- Caño with Boston Legacy FC in 2025

Personal information
- Birth name: Alba Caño Isant
- Date of birth: 30 September 2003 (age 23)
- Place of birth: Puiggròs, Catalonia, Spain
- Height: 1.65 m (5 ft 5 in)
- Position: Midfielder

Team information
- Current team: Boston Legacy
- Number: 26

Youth career
- 2008–2015: Les Garrigues
- 2015–2018: SE AEM
- 2018–2020: Barcelona

Senior career*
Years	Team	Apps	(Gls)
2020–2024	Barcelona B		
2022–2025	Barcelona	10	(1)
2026–	Boston Legacy	30	(5)
2025	→ Barcelona (loan)	0	(0)

International career^{‡}
2022	Spain U-19	7	(0)
2025–	Catalonia	1	(0)
- * Club domestic league appearances and goals as of 03:21, 4 November 2026 (UTC) ‡ National team caps and goals as of 18:49, 31 December 2024 (UTC)

Alba Caño Isant (born 30 September 2003) is a Spanish professional footballer who plays as a midfielder for Boston Legacy FC of the National Women's Soccer League (NWSL). She previously played for Liga F club Barcelona.

== Club career ==
=== Early career ===
Caño is from Puiggròs, Catalonia. She started her football career at the age of five with local team Escola Futbol Comarçal Les Garrigues before moving to SE AEM in Lleida in 2015 and joining Barcelona three years later.

=== Barcelona ===
Caño joined Barcelona's youth setup in 2018. After two years, she was promoted to the B team in 2020. She began being incorporated in training with the first team in 2022.

Caño made her first-team – and Liga F – debut on 3 November 2022 in a 4–0 away win against Levante.

Caño played her first match of the 2024–25 season on 8 September 2024 when she came on as a substitute and played the remaining 44 minutes of the game in a 3–0 away victory at Deportivo de La Coruña.

=== Boston Legacy ===
Alba Cano with the Boston Legacy in 2026

On 31 July 2025, National Women's Soccer League (NWSL) expansion team Boston Legacy announced the signing of Caño on a two-and-a-half-year contract with the team option for an additional year. She remained at Barcelona on loan until Boston began play in 2026, making just one appearance in their Copa de la Reina win against Alavés on 21 December 2025.

Caño made her NWSL debut starting in Boston's inaugural game, which they lost 1–0 to defending champions Gotham FC. She scored her first NWSL goal on 29 April 2026, netting the opener in a 2–2 draw with the North Carolina Courage. She ended the inaugural season with Boston starting 30 games and scoring 5 goals. She was rewarded with a two-year contract extension through 2029.
