= Laís Araújo =

Brazilian soccer player

- Araújo with the Boston Legacy in 2026

Personal information
- Full name: Laís dos Santos Araújo
- Date of birth: 16 March 1996 (age 30)
- Place of birth: Salvador, Brazil
- Height: 1.73 m (5 ft 8 in)
- Positions: Centre back; midfielder

Team information
- Current team: Boston Legacy
- Number: 24

College career
Years	Team	Apps	(Gls)
2014–2015	ASA College	21	(20)
2017–2018	Florida Gators	44	(7)

Senior career*
Years	Team	Apps	(Gls)
2013	São Francisco	5	(1)
2017	Sport Club do Recife	14	(1)
2019	Arna-Bjørnar	21	(2)
2019–2020	Adelaide United	11	(0)
2020	Apollon		
2021	Madrid CFF	12	(0)
2021–2023	Famalicão	30	(2)
2023–2025	Benfica	23	(4)
2026–	Boston Legacy	10	(0)

International career^{‡}
2016	Brazil U20		
- * Club domestic league appearances and goals as of 03:20, 4 November 2026 (UTC) ‡ National team caps and goals as of 15:24, 4 September 2021 (UTC)

Laís dos Santos Araújo (born 16 March 1996) is a Brazilian professional footballer who plays as a centre back or midfielder for Boston Legacy FC of the National Women's Soccer League (NWSL).

== Early life ==
Araújo was born in Salvador, Brazil and lived her early years in a favela. She learned to play soccer on the streets and featured on the documentary Warriors of a Beautiful Game which brought her to the attention of Pelé.

The documentary looked at the state of the women's game in several countries on various continent and how the development of women's equality mirrored the focus women's soccer received.

== Club career ==
Araújo has spent time playing college soccer for ASA College and the Florida Gators.

She spent the 2019 season playing for Arna-Bjørnar, 21 league games, before signing with Adelaide United for the 2019–20 W-League season.

In September 2020, Araújo joined Cypriot club Apollon Limassol.

On December 8th, 2025, NWSL club Boston Legacy FC announced the signing of Araújo to their inaugural squad.

== International career ==
Araújo played for the Brazilian under 20 team, which she captained. She played in the 2016 FIFA U-20 Women's World Cup team.
