= Sammy Smith (soccer, born 2001) =

American soccer player (born 2001)

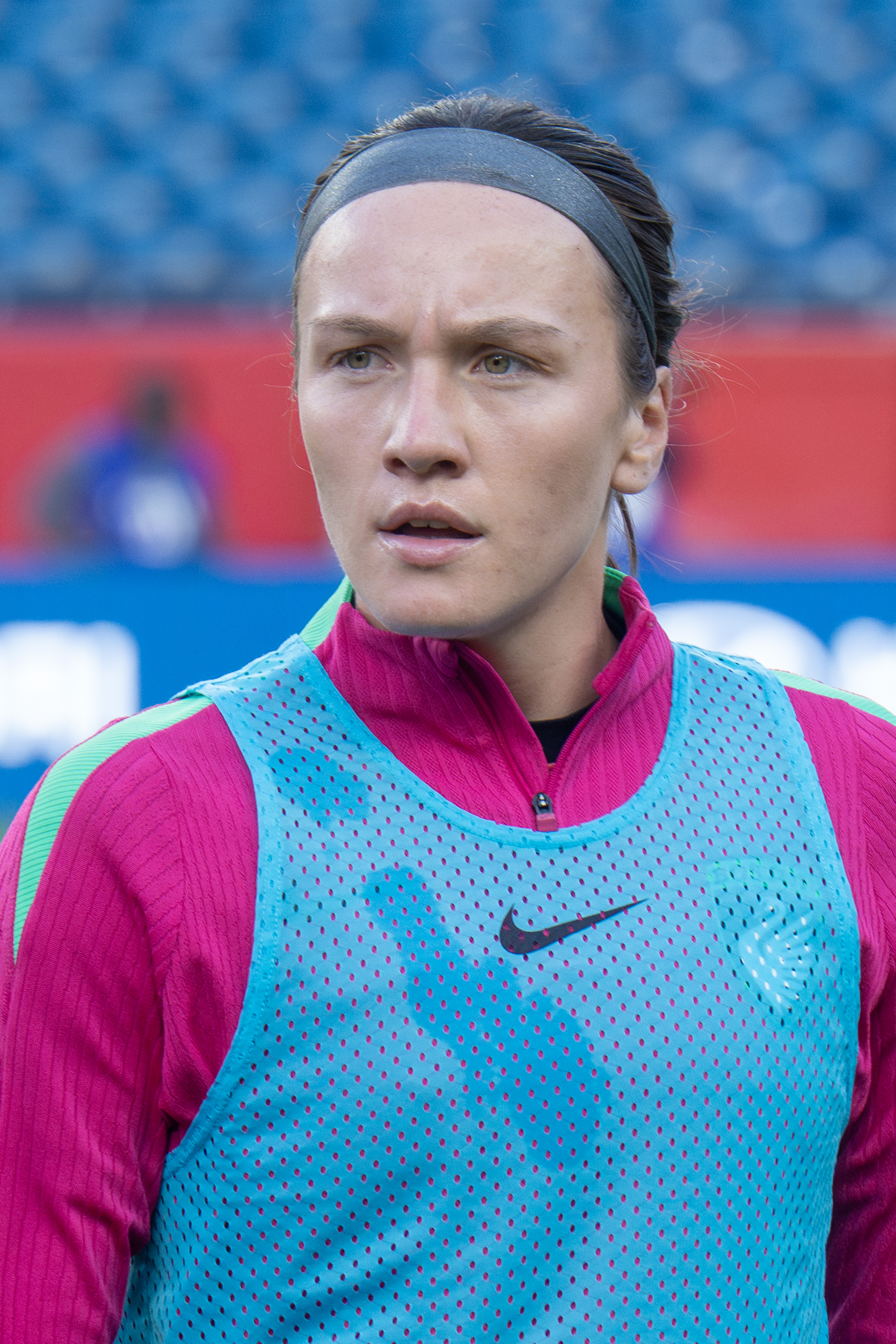
- Smith with the Boston Legacy in 2026

Personal information
- Full name: Samantha Rose Smith
- Date of birth: July 5, 2001(age 25)
- Height: 5 ft 6 in (1.68 m)
- Position: Forward

Team information
- Current team: Boston Legacy
- Number: 8

Youth career
- South Shore Select

College career
Years	Team	Apps	(Gls)
2019–2022	Boston College Eagles	72	(26)
2023	Texas A&M Aggies	22	(3)

Senior career*
Years	Team	Apps	(Gls)
2024	FHL	14	(15)
2024	→ Breiðablik (loan)	7	(9)
2025	Breiðablik	23	(12)
2026–	Boston Legacy	26	(5)
- * Club domestic league appearances and goals as of 02:17, November 8, 2026 (UTC)

Samantha Rose Smith (born July 5, 2001) is an American professional soccer player who plays as a forward for Boston Legacy FC of the National Women's Soccer League (NWSL). She played college soccer for the Boston College Eagles and the Texas A&M Aggies. She started her professional career in Iceland in 2024, achieving top-flight promotion with FHL and winning two national championships and one national cup with Breiðablik.

== Early life ==
Smith grew up in Hanson, Massachusetts, one of three children born to David and Renee Smith. She played soccer and basketball at Whitman-Hanson Regional High School, earning state all-star honors as a defender. She played club soccer for South Shore Select. Initially committed to New Hampshire, she switched her college commitment to Boston College.

== College career ==
Smith started all 18 games in her freshman season with the Boston College Eagles in 2019. She led the team with 8 goals, which included two braces – in a win against Princeton and a loss to Florida State – and was named to the ACC all-freshman team. She went on to be Boston College's leading scorer in three out of her four years on the team, finishing with 26 goals in 72 games. With a fifth year of college eligibility due to the COVID-19 pandemic, Smith transferred to the Texas A&M Aggies in 2023. She scored 3 goals and led the team with 7 assists in 22 games, helping the Aggies to the SEC tournament semifinals.

== Club career ==
=== FHL and Breiðablik ===
Smith signed her first professional contract with Icelandic club FHL, playing in the second-tier 1. deild kvenna, in February 2024. She scored 15 goals in 14 games, second in the league only to her teammate Emma Hawkins, as the club won the league title and earned promotion to the top-flight Besta deild kvenna. In August 2024, she joined first-tier club Breiðablik on loan until the end of the Besta deild kvenna season. She scored 9 goals in 7 league games, including a 14-minute hat trick against Þór/KA, as she helped Breiðablik win the league title. In doing so, she achieved the rare combination of winning Iceland's second-division and first-division league titles in the same year. On September 4, she scored her first continental goal against Minsk in her debut in UEFA Women's Champions League qualifying, before Breiðablik lost to Sporting CP in the next round. She re-signed with Breiðablik for the following season.

Smith scored 12 goals in 24 league games in 2025, helping Breiðablik retain the league title. On August 16, she scored two goals including the extra-time winner in a 3–2 victory over FH to win the Icelandic Women's Football Cup. Later that month, she scored twice against Athlone Town in Champions League qualifying. Breiðablik lost in the next round but earned a place in the inaugural UEFA Women's Europa Cup. On November 19, she scored a goal and forced a stoppage-time own goal in a 4–2 win over Fortuna Hjørring in the second leg of the Europa Cup round of sixteen, helping Breiðablik overturn a three-goal deficit to advance to the quarterfinals.

=== Boston Legacy ===
On December 29, 2025, National Women's Soccer League (NWSL) expansion team Boston Legacy announced the signing of Smith on a two-year contract. She made her NWSL debut in the Legacy's first road game, starting in a 3–0 loss to the Houston Dash on March 21, 2026. On April 29, she scored her first NWSL goal in a 2–2 draw with the North Carolina Courage as Boston earned their first point in the standings.

== Honors and awards ==
FHL

- 1. deild kvenna: 2024

Breiðablik

- Besta deild kvenna: 2024, 2025
- Icelandic Women's Football Cup: 2025
- Icelandic Women's Football League Cup: 2025

Individual

- ACC all-freshman team: 2019
