= Domènec Guasch =

Spanish football executive

Boston Legacy FC
- General Manager

Teams
- As executive: FC Barcelona Femení (2011–2024) various; Boston Legacy FC (2024– General manager

Domènec Guasch is an association football executive who currently serves as the general manager of Boston Legacy FC. His career is focused on the women's game, most notably with FC Barcelona in Spain, where he began as a youth coach and progressed to Head of Management for Women’s Football over the course of 14 years.

== Early life ==
Guasch was born and raised in Barcelona, Spain. He grew up an avid fan of FC Barcelona.

Guasch attended the University of Barcelona, from which he graduated with a degree in sports science. During his time in school, he also earned his UEFA A license.

== Career ==
Guasch began his career as a youth coach at CF Begues, a regional club near Barcelona, Spain, at age 16. He spent nearly 6 years there, the last two as a sports coordinator.

In 2011, Domè joined FC Barcelona as Head Coach & International Camps Coordinator. He went on to hold several roles, in the organization, including as the local project director for the Barça academies in São Paulo, Rio de Janeiro, and New York. Subsequently in New York, he spent 3 years as a project executive and head of America at Barça academy, before taking over as Head of Management for Women's Football.

In 2024, the Boston Legacy (then BOS Nation) announced Guasch as their inaugural General Manager. Guasch cited "The opportunity to build this team from the ground up" as the reason to leave FC Barcelona.
