= Annie Karich =

American soccer player (born 2003)

- Karich with the Boston Legacy in 2026

Personal information
- Full name: Annie Lee Karich
- Date of birth: October 26, 2003 (age 23)
- Place of birth: California, United States
- Height: 1.75 m (5 ft 9 in)
- Positions: Defensive midfielder; center back

Team information
- Current team: Boston Legacy
- Number: 6

Youth career
- 2018–2019: Blues FC
- 2019–2021: Beach FC

College career
Years	Team	Apps	(Gls)
2022–2023	Santa Clara Broncos	41	(2)

Senior career*
Years	Team	Apps	(Gls)
2024–2025	SC Freiburg	33	(0)
2026–	Boston Legacy	30	(1)
2025	→ América (loan)	23	(0)

International career
2019	United States U-17		
2022	United States U-20		
- * Club domestic league appearances and goals as of 02:14, November 8, 2026 (UTC)

Annie Lee Karich (born October 26, 2003) is an American professional soccer player who plays as a defensive midfielder for Boston Legacy FC of the National Women's Soccer League (NWSL). She played college soccer for the Santa Clara Broncos before starting her professional career with Frauen-Bundesliga club SC Freiburg.

== Early life ==
Karich grew up in Surfside, California, the daughter of parents who played college basketball and college lacrosse at Santa Clara University. She began playing soccer when she was three. She played club soccer for Blues SC and Beach SC, winning the ECNL under-16 national title with the former in 2019. Before her freshman year, she had committed to play college soccer for the Santa Clara Broncos. She attended Mater Dei High School, where she earned Trinity League MVP and first-team All-CIF honors. Before starting college, she trained with hometown NWSL expansion team Angel City FC in the 2022 preseason.

== College career ==
Karich had a strong freshman season with the Santa Clara Broncos in 2022, recording a team-high 8 assists and starting all but one game in 20 appearances. She helped the Broncos win the West Coast Conference (WCC) regular-season championship and was named first-team All-WCC and the WCC Freshman of the Year. She started all 21 games and scored 2 goals with 2 assists as a sophomore in 2023. Leading a team that allowed just three goals in conference play, she was named first-team All-WCC and the WCC Defender of the Year. After two seasons at Santa Clara, she decided to go pro and give up her remaining college eligibility.

== Club career ==
On November 24, 2023, German club SC Freiburg announced that they had signed Karich to her first professional contract and she would arrive after the winter break. She made her professional debut in the first game of the year, starting and playing the full match at center back, in a 2–0 win over RB Leipzig on January 27, 2024. She made a solid defensive partnership with Janina Minge, helping the club to three consecutive clean sheets in February/March, before moving to defensive midfielder toward the end of the season. She made 12 league appearances that season. The following season, she made 21 appearances as SC Freiburg finished fifth in the league.

On July 2, 2025, Boston Legacy announced the signing of Karich as the NWSL expansion team's first player, signing a two-and-a-half-year contract with the option for a further year. She was loaned to Liga MX Femenil side Club América through the end of the year before Boston's inaugural season. During her time in Mexico, she made key contributions with the most minutes in the squad as América reached the Apertura playoff final.

== International career ==
Karich began training with the United States under-15 team in 2018. She was a regular part of the under-17 team the following year. She was named to the under-20 squad for the 2022 FIFA U-20 Women's World Cup as an injury replacement for her Santa Clara teammate Sally Menti.

== Honors and awards ==
Santa Clara Broncos

- West Coast Conference: 2022

Individual

- First-team All-WCC: 2022, 2023
- WCC Defender of the Year: 2023
- WCC Freshman of the Year: 2022
