= Nicolette Hernández =

American-born Mexican footballer (born 1999)

- Hernández with the Boston Legacy in 2026

Personal information
- Full name: Nicolette Andrea Hernández Sippel
- Date of birth: 17 February 1999 (age 27)
- Place of birth: Naperville, Illinois, U.S.
- Height: 1.72 m (5 ft 8 in)
- Position: Left back

Team information
- Current team: Boston Legacy
- Number: 20

College career
Years	Team	Apps	(Gls)
2017–2021	Michigan Wolverines	93	(29)

Senior career*
Years	Team	Apps	(Gls)
2022–2025	América	133	(12)
2026–	Boston Legacy	21	(0)

International career^{‡}
2022–	Mexico	28	(1)
Medal record
Women's football
Representing Mexico
Pan American Games
Gold medal – first place	2023 Santiago	Team
- * Club domestic league appearances and goals as of 02:13, 8 November 2026 (UTC) ‡ National team caps and goals as of 16 January 2026

Nicolette Andrea Hernández Sippel (born 17 February 1999) is a professional footballer who plays as a left back for Boston Legacy FC of the National Women's Soccer League (NWSL). Born in the United States, she plays for the Mexico national team. She played college soccer for the Michigan Wolverines. She began her professional career with Club América in 2022, winning one championship from six Liga MX Femenil finals appearances.

== College career ==
Hernández played college soccer for the Michigan Wolverines from 2017 to 2021, making 93 appearances and scoring 29 goals with the Wolverines.

== Club career ==
Nicki Hernandez during Boston Legacy v Houston Dash on 20 September 2026

=== Club América ===
Hernández signed her first professional contract with Club América of the Liga MX Femenil on 31 December 2021, and made her professional debut in January 2022 in a match against Pumas. Hernández scored her first goal as a professional on 10 February 2022 in a match against León.

Originally a forward, Hernández became a key player for América after manager Ángel Villacampa switched her to play as a left-back. She helped the league championship in the Clausura 2023 and reached the league finals on five other occasions.

On 5 December 2025, Club América announced that Hernández was departing América after spending four years at the club.

=== Boston Legacy ===
On 5 January 2026, National Women's Soccer League (NWSL) expansion team Boston Legacy FC announced the signing of Hernández on a two-year contract.

== International career ==
Hernández was at one point part of the United States national team youth program during her early teens.

As Hernández's paternal grandparents were born in Mexico, she had the option to represent Mexico at the international stage. She was called to the Mexico women's national football team for the first time on 18 November 2021 for a pair of friendly matches against Canada, but was unable to attend. Hernández was called once more to the Mexico national team by manager Pedro López on 3 October 2022 to replace Joseline Montoya (Injury) for a friendly match against Chile. She made her debut with Mexico on 10 October 2022 on the friendly match against Chile.

=== 2023 Pan American Games ===
Hernández was selected to represent Mexico at the 2023 Pan American Games held in Santiago, Chile, where the Mexican squad went undefeated to win the gold medal for the first time in their history at the Pan American Games, defeating Chile 1–0. Hernández started all five matches during this tournament.

=== 2024 W Gold Cup ===
Hernández was selected to be part of Mexico's squad for the 2024 CONCACAF W Gold Cup on 11 February 2024. She scored her first goal with Mexico during this tournament, in the 0–8 victory against Dominican Republic in the second match of the group stage. Hernandez played an important part for Mexico to finished top of its group in this tournament and advancing to the knockout stage, and subsequently the semi-finals, but during the semi-final match against Brazil, Hernández got a red card at the 29th minute for a foul called after VAR review. México subsequently ended up losing the match 3–0.

== Personal life ==
Hernández is engaged her long-time girlfriend Nat Cruz on June 16, 2026.

== Career statistics ==
=== Club ===
As of match played 2 March 2024

Appearances and goals by club, season, and competition
Club	Season	League			Cup (Note: Includes Campeón de Campeones)		League Cup (Note: Includes Summer Cup)		Continental (Note: Includes CONCACAF W Champions Cup)		Total	
Club	Season	Division	Apps	Goals	Apps	Goals	Apps	Goals	Apps	Goals	Apps	Goals
Club América	2021–22	Liga MX Femenil	16	2	—		—		—		16	2
Club América	2022–23	Liga MX Femenil	37	3	—		—		—		37	3
Club América	2023–24	Liga MX Femenil	30	1	2	0	—		—		32	1
Club América	2024–25	Liga MX Femenil	34	5	—		3	0	6	1	43	6
Club América	Total		117	11	2	0	3	0	6	1	128	12
Career total			117	11	2	0	3	0	6	1	128	12

=== International goals ===
No.	Date	Venue	Opponent	Score	Result	Competition
1.	23 February 2024	Dignity Health Sports Park, Carson, United States	Dominican Republic	1–0	8–0	2024 CONCACAF W Gold Cup
2.	2 March 2026	Daren Sammy Cricket Ground, Gros Islet, Saint Lucia	Saint Lucia	6–0	7–0	2026 CONCACAF W Championship qualification

== Honours and awards ==
Michigan Wolverines

- Big Ten women's soccer tournament: 2021

Club América

- Liga MX Femenil: Clausura 2023

Mexico

- Pan American Games gold medal: 2023

Individual

- First-team All-Big Ten: 2020
- Second-team All-Big Ten: 2021
- Third-team All-Big Ten: 2019
