= Kaká (footballer, born 1999) =

Brazilian footballer

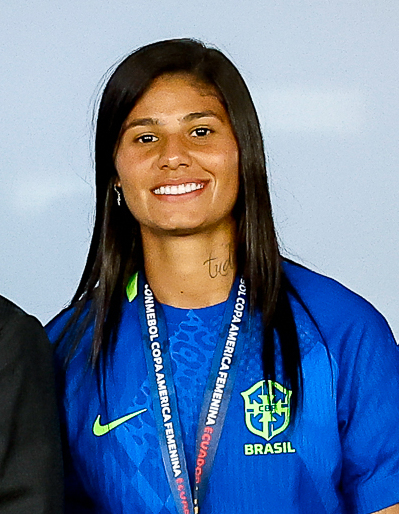
- Kaká in 2025

Personal information
- Full name: Andressa Karolaine Freire Gomes Ferreira
- Date of birth: 2 August 1999 (age 27)
- Place of birth: Brasília, Brazil
- Height: 1.76 m (5 ft 9 in)
- Position: Centre back

Team information
- Current team: Boston Legacy
- Number: 3

Youth career
- 2016–2018: Minas Brasília

Senior career*
Years	Team	Apps	(Gls)
2018–2021	Minas Brasília	48	(3)
2022–2023	Santos	24	(1)
2024–2025	São Paulo	20	(0)
2026–	Boston Legacy	3	(0)

International career^{‡}
2024–	Brazil	1	(0)
Medal record
Women's football
Representing Brazil
Copa América Femenina
Gold medal – first place	2025 Ecuador
- * Club domestic league appearances and goals as of 03:19, 4 November 2026 (UTC) ‡ National team caps and goals as of 20:35, 26 November 2024 (UTC)

Andressa Karolaine Freire Gomes Ferreira (born 2 August 1999), commonly known as Kaká, is a Brazilian professional footballer who plays as a centre back for Boston Legacy FC of the National Women's Soccer League (NWSL) and the Brazil national team.

== Club career ==
Born in Brasília, Federal District, Kaká began her career with local side Minas Brasília in 2016, as a forward. Promoted to the first team in 2018, she was a first-choice as the side won the year's Campeonato Brasileiro de Futebol Feminino Série A2.

She remained as a starter for Minas in the following years, suffering relegation from the Campeonato Brasileiro de Futebol Feminino Série A1 in 2021. On 4 February 2022, she moved to Santos.

On 21 November 2022, Kaká renewed her contract with Santos for a further year. She announced her departure from the club on 2 January 2024.

On 6 January 2026, National Women's Soccer League (NWSL) expansion team Boston Legacy FC announced the signing of Kaká on two-year contract with a club option for another year.

== Honours ==
Minas Brasília

- Campeonato Brasileiro de Futebol Feminino Série A2: 2018

São Paulo

- Supercopa do Brasil: 2025

Brazil

- Copa América Femenina: 2025
