= Deja Davis =

American soccer player (born 1995)

- Davis with the Boston Legacy in 2026

Personal information
- Full name: Deja Nicole Davis
- Date of birth: June 22, 1995 (age 31)
- Height: 5 ft 9 in (1.75 m)
- Position: Center back

Team information
- Current team: Boston Legacy
- Number: 29

College career
Years	Team	Apps	(Gls)
2013–2016	La Salle Explorers	84	(10)

Senior career*
Years	Team	Apps	(Gls)
2017–2024	Le Havre	113+	(15+)
2024–2026	Paris FC	65	(0)
2026–	Boston Legacy	11	(1)
- * Club domestic league appearances and goals as of 03:23, November 4, 2026 (UTC)

Deja Nicole Davis (born June 22, 1995) is an American professional soccer player who plays as a center back for Boston Legacy FC of the National Women's Soccer League (NWSL). Davis played college soccer for the La Salle Explorers and began her professional career with Le Havre in 2017. After seven seasons at Le Havre, she joined Première Ligue club Paris FC in 2024, winning the Coupe de France Féminine in her debut season.

== Early life ==
Raised in Montclair, New Jersey, Davis played three sports at Montclair High School. She captained both the soccer and softball teams and played basketball, earning all-state honors in soccer after scoring 19 goals in her senior season.

== College career ==
Davis attended La Salle University in Philadelphia, where she played for the La Salle Explorers soccer team. She helped the team win the Atlantic 10 Conference tournament during her freshman season in 2013, also picking up conference all-rookie honors. In her sophomore season in 2014, the team earned an at-large bid to the NCAA tournament after falling in the conference tournament final. After two seasons primarily as a substitute, Davis started every game for the Explorers in her junior and senior seasons, scoring 8 goals and adding 7 assists in 39 games between them.

== Club career ==
=== Le Havre ===
After graduating from college, Davis began her professional career with then-Division 3 Féminine club Le Havre AC in July 2017, joining the team along with two other former La Salle players. Le Havre won promotion to the Division 2 Féminine in her first professional season. Davis also scored 6 goals in 5 games in the 2017–18 Coupe de France Féminine, helping the club to the quarterfinals.

The following season ended in second place for Le Havre, but the 2019–20 season saw the team become Division 2 champions and gain promotion to the Division 1 Féminine. Davis scored 7 goals in 29 games during those two seasons in the second division.

Davis made her Division 1 debut on September 5, 2020, starting and playing the full 90 minutes as Le Havre won 4–0 against Issy. Her first top-flight goal came the following week as the opener in a 3–1 defeat Fleury on September 12. However, the team won just one more game the rest of the season and was relegated back to Division 2. Davis played in 21 games, all but two as a starter, and scored 1 goal, featuring at center back, left or right back, and sometimes midfielder or forward.

Davis moved permanently to center back before the 2021–22 season on the advice of general manager Laure Lepailleur. On May 22, 2022, Davis scored the second goal in a 4–0 win against FC Vendenheim that secured Le Havre's return to the top division. She finished the season with 3 goals in 19 games.

Davis started all 22 games in the 2022–23 season and played every minute of the season alongside goalkeeper Laëtitia Philippe. She added 2 goals for Le Havre, who placed eighth in Division 1. The following season, she again scored 2 goals in 22 games, with Le Havre finishing ninth in the league.

=== Paris FC ===
After seven seasons at Le Havre, Davis joined fellow Division 1 team Paris FC in May 2024, signing a two-year contract. She made her club debut – and continental debut – against First Vienna the first qualifying round of the UEFA Women's Champions League, playing the full match in a 9–0 victory. Manchester City eliminated Paris FC in the second qualifying round. On January 26, 2025, she scored her first goal for Paris FC in a Coupe de France match, scoring the second in a 6–0 round of 16 win against La Roche-sur-Yon. On May 3, she lifted the Coupe de France trophy after winning the final against city rivals Paris Saint-Germain, prevailing 5–4 on penalties after a 0–0 draw in regulation.

The following season, Davis helped Paris FC advance to the Champions League knockout rounds for the first time in club history, losing to Real Madrid. On May 16, 2026, she played the full match in the league semifinals as Paris FC won 1–0 against Paris Saint-Germain to reach the league final, also having finished above the rival club in second place in the standings. She left Paris FC after two seasons with the club, having made 65 appearances in all competitions.

=== Boston Legacy ===
On July 1, 2026, Davis signed a two-and-a-half-year contract with National Women's Soccer League (NWSL) expansion team Boston Legacy FC.

== International career ==
Davis was called up to the United States under-23 team before an international friendly tournament August 2018.

== Honors and awards ==
La Salle Explorers

- Atlantic 10 Conference tournament: 2013

Paris FC

- Coupe de France Féminine: 2024–25

Individual

- Atlantic 10 Conference all-rookie team: 2013
