= Emerson Elgin =

American soccer player (born 2003)

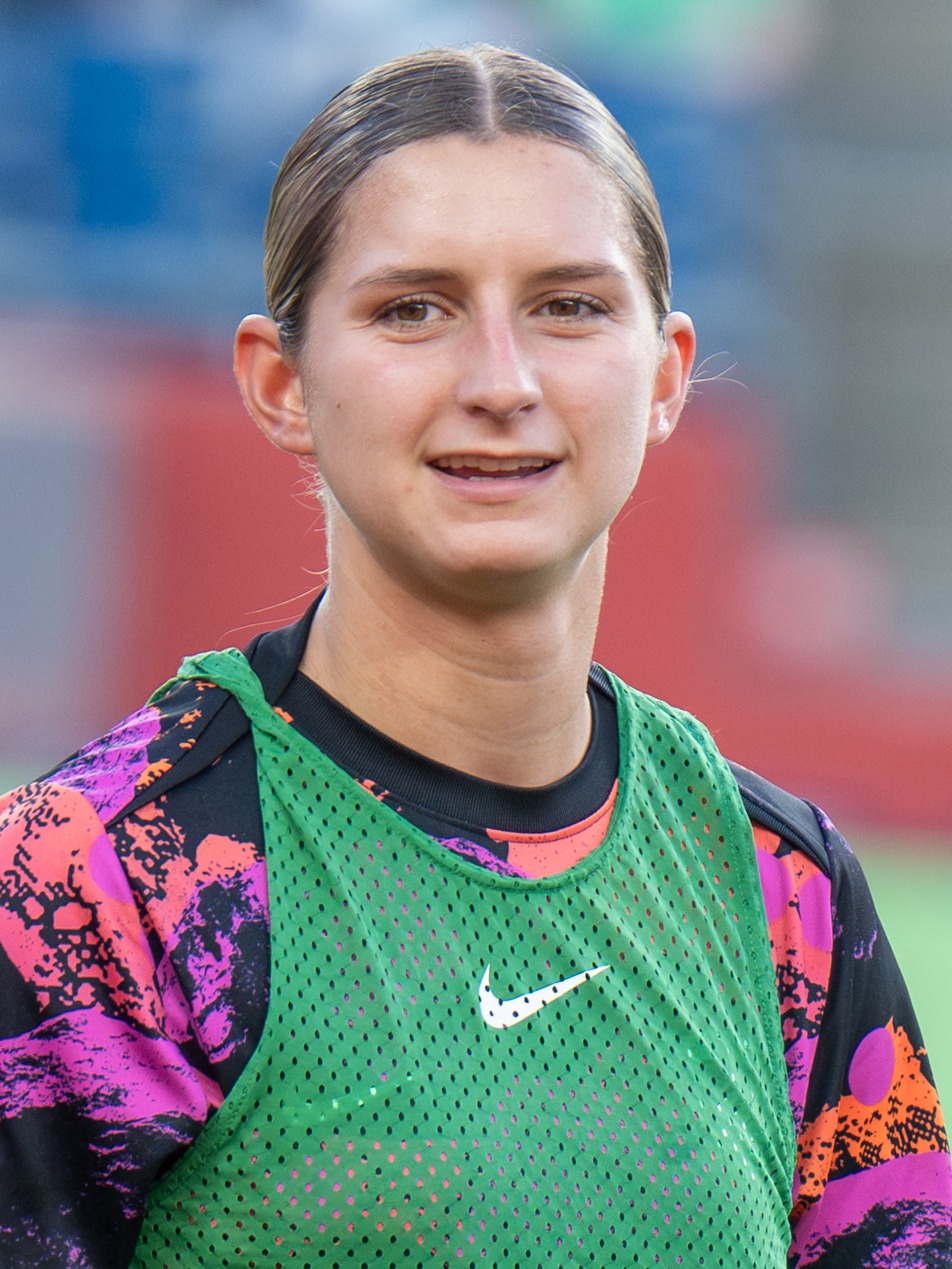
- Elgin with the Boston Legacy in 2026

Personal information
- Full name: Emerson Mackenzie Elgin
- Date of birth: March 21, 2003 (age 23)
- Height: 5 ft 7 in (1.70 m)
- Positions: Center back; left back

Team information
- Current team: Boston Legacy
- Number: 4

Youth career
- Players Development Academy
- 2018: Ramapo Raiders
- 2019–2021: STA

College career
Years	Team	Apps	(Gls)
2021–2024	North Carolina Tar Heels	73	(1)

Senior career*
Years	Team	Apps	(Gls)
2024	North Carolina Courage U23	5	(2)
2025	Gotham FC	0	(0)
2026–	Boston Legacy	17	(0)
2025	→ Tampa Bay Sun (loan)	2	(0)
- * Club domestic league appearances and goals as of 03:23, November 4, 2026 (UTC)

Emerson Mackenzie Elgin (born March 21, 2003) is an American professional soccer player who plays as a center back or left back for Boston Legacy FC of the National Women's Soccer League (NWSL). She played college soccer for the North Carolina Tar Heels, winning the 2024 national championship.

== Early life ==
Elgin grew up in Franklin Lakes, New Jersey, the daughter of Johanna and Ernest Elgin, and has three older brothers. She played soccer at a young age in the footsteps of her brothers, two of whom played in college. She attended Ramapo High School, earning all-state honors and leading the team with 20 goals in 16 games in her lone season as a sophomore. She played club soccer for Players Development Academy before moving to STA Soccer, where she was team captain. She committed to North Carolina as a freshman.

== College career ==
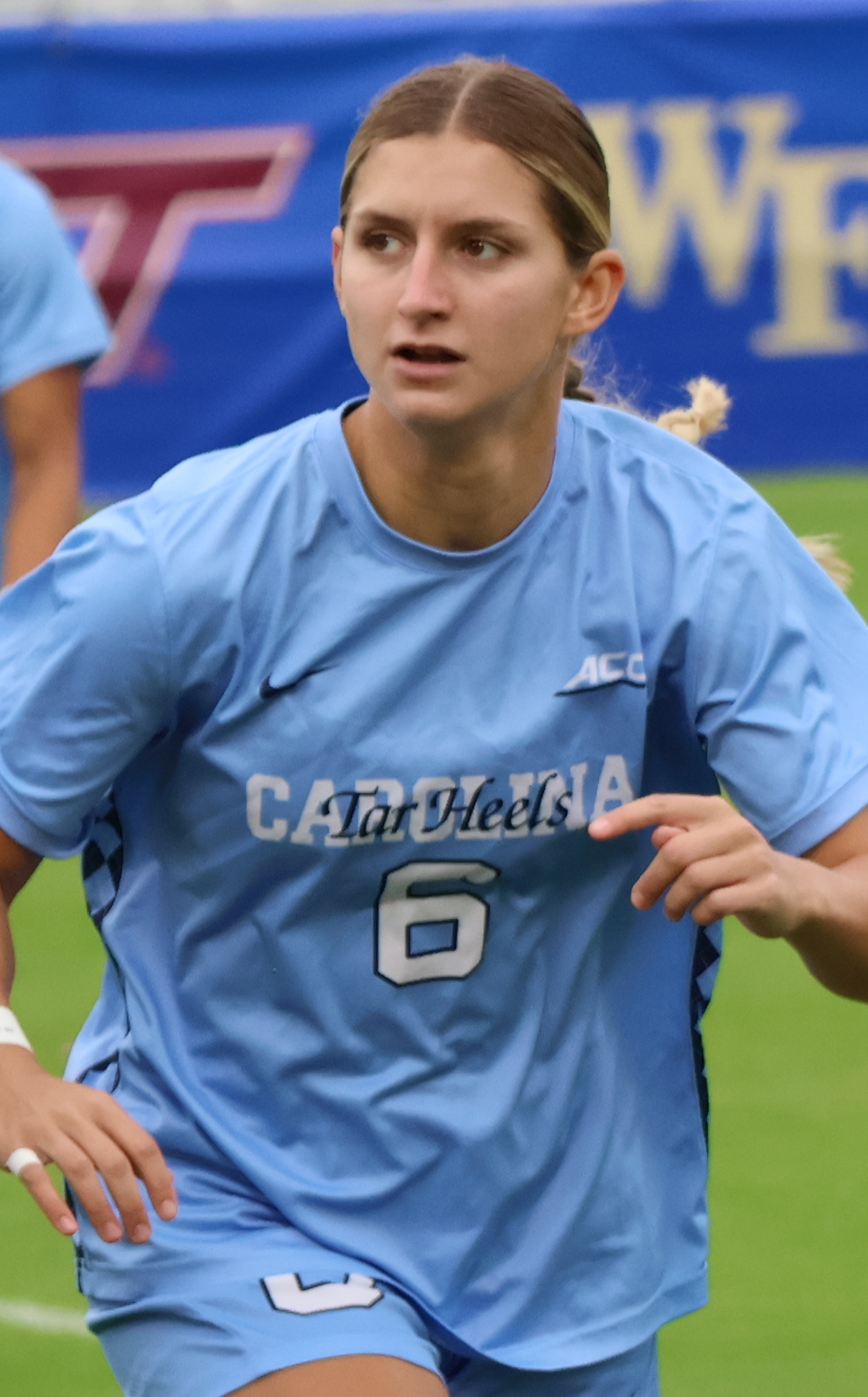
Elgin with North Carolina in 2024

Elgin entered her freshman season with North Carolina Tar Heels as a starter but tore her quadriceps in the second game of the season, ruling her out for the rest of the year. She returned the next year to play in 23 games (7 starts) as a sophomore in 2022, starting the last five rounds in the NCAA tournament as North Carolina finished runners-up to UCLA. In 2023, she recorded 3 assists in 22 games (21 starts), including the winning assist to Ally Sentnor in the NCAA tournament second round as North Carolina reached the quarterfinals. She was the only starter to return to the team in 2024, when she played in 26 games (25 starts) and scored 1 goal with 1 assist. She played every minute in the NCAA tournament after the first round, helping her team concede just once in six games. North Carolina defeated Wake Forest 1–0 in the final to win its 23rd national title and first since 2012.

During college, Elgin also played for the 2024 USL W League champion North Carolina Courage U23, scoring two goals in five games.

== Club career ==
Elgin trained with the National Women's Soccer League (NWSL)'s North Carolina Courage and Gotham FC as a non-roster trialist in the 2025 preseason. On April 12, Gotham FC signed Elgin to a short-term injury replacement contract through June, but she did not make any appearances.

On July 17, 2025, NWSL expansion team Boston Legacy announced the signing of Elgin on a two-and-a-half-year deal through 2027. Before the Legacy began play, she finished the year on loan with USL Super League club Tampa Bay Sun. With the Sun, she made her professional debut in their season-opening 2–1 loss to Brooklyn FC on August 23, but then got a foot injury that limited her to just one more appearance.

Elgin made her NWSL debut on April 25, 2026, earning the start in a 2–0 defeat to the Chicago Stars.

== International career ==
Elgin was invited to virtual training with the United States under-19 team during the COVID-19 pandemic in 2021.

== Honors ==
North Carolina Courage U23

- USL W League: 2024

North Carolina Tar Heels

- NCAA Division I women's soccer tournament: 2024

Gotham FC

- CONCACAF W Champions Cup: 2024–25
