= Ana María Guzmán =

Colombian footballer (born 2005)

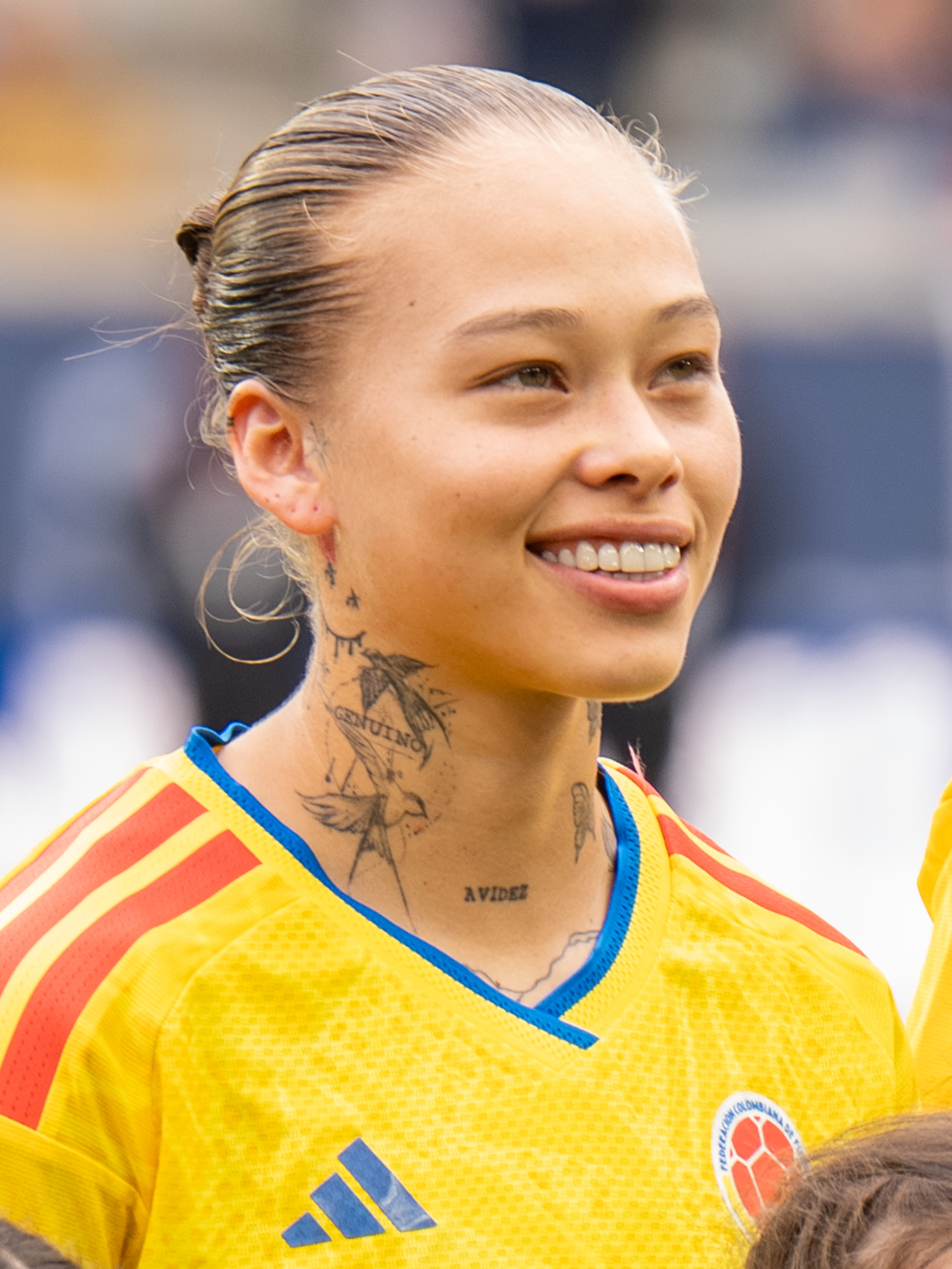
- Guzmán in 2026

Personal information
- Full name: Ana María Guzmán Zapata
- Date of birth: 11 June 2005 (age 21)
- Place of birth: Mistrató, Colombia
- Height: 1.62 m (5 ft 4 in)
- Position: Right-back

Team information
- Current team: Palmeiras
- Number: 2

Senior career*
Years	Team	Apps	(Gls)
2022–2023	Deportivo Pereira	21	(0)
2023–2026	Bayern Munich	2	(0)
2024	Bayern Munich II	6	(3)
2025	→ Utah Royals (loan)	5	(0)
2025–2026	→ Palmeiras (loan)	11	(1)
2026–	Palmeiras	0	(0)

International career^{‡}
2022	Colombia U17	6	(0)
2022	Colombia U20	11	(0)
2023–	Colombia	25	(2)
Medal record
Women's football
Representing Colombia
CONMEBOL Women's Nations League
Gold medal – first place	2025–26
Copa América Femenina
Silver medal – second place	2025 Ecuador
Bolivarian Games
Gold medal – first place	2022 Valledupar	Team
- * Club domestic league appearances and goals as of 10 July 2025 ‡ National team caps and goals as of 15 June 2026

Ana María Guzmán Zapata (born 11 June 2005) is a Colombian professional footballer who plays as a right back for Série A1 club Palmeiras and the Colombia national team.

Raised in the small Risaralda town of Mistrató, Guzmán moved to Pereira at 11 to pursue the game and began her senior career with Deportivo Pereira. She joined Bayern Munich at 18 on a four-year contract, but a knee injury sustained on international duty kept her out for most of a year and she made only two first-team appearances for the German club before loan spells at the Utah Royals and Palmeiras, the latter becoming permanent in 2026.

Guzmán was a runner-up at the 2022 FIFA U-17 Women's World Cup and made her senior debut at the 2023 FIFA Women's World Cup, where she came off the bench in the round of 16 and set up the winning goal against Jamaica. She finished second at the 2025 Copa América Femenina and scored twice in the decisive match of the inaugural CONMEBOL Women's Nations League in June 2026, as Colombia took the title and qualified for the 2027 FIFA Women's World Cup.

== Early life ==
Guzmán was born on 11 June 2005 and grew up in Mistrató, a small municipality in the north-west of Risaralda. She started playing at the age of six and was for a time the only girl playing football in the town, joining in with her siblings, cousins and other children from the neighbourhood; she also played volleyball and basketball.

She trained at Club Sueños Dorados in Mistrató and, at 11, moved to Pereira on the recommendation of the coach Carlos Ariel to join Club Atlético Dosquebradas, at first living with another family before her parents relocated to be with her. Money was tight — she has recalled the family going without in order to afford bus fares — and she was called into Colombia's youth set-up at 13.

== Club career ==
=== Deportivo Pereira ===
Guzmán began her senior career with Deportivo Pereira in 2022, making 21 league appearances across two seasons. Her displays at the 2023 World Cup drew interest from Europe, with Manchester City and Arsenal reported among the clubs pursuing her before she chose Bayern Munich.

=== Bayern Munich ===
On 19 September 2023, Guzmán signed a four-year contract with Bayern Munich of the Frauen-Bundesliga. She had been expected to spend the rest of 2023 on loan at Atlético Nacional in order to play the Copa Libertadores, held in Colombia that October, but the club did not register her before CONMEBOL's deadline of 8 September and the arrangement lapsed; she played instead in a CONMEBOL development tournament in Uruguay with Colombia's under-20 side before moving to Germany.

Weeks after signing, Guzmán damaged the cartilage in her right knee in training with Colombia. She was operated on in Germany on 17 November 2023, and Bayern said she would be out for several months. She returned to competition in late September 2024 with the club's reserve team, coming on against Union Berlin after around nine months out. Her first-team debut came on 17 November 2024, more than a year after she had joined, when she replaced Linda Dallmann in the 83rd minute of a 5–0 Bundesliga win over Carl Zeiss Jena.

=== Utah Royals (loan) ===
On 10 January 2025, National Women's Soccer League club Utah Royals signed Guzmán on a one-year loan for the 2025 NWSL season. She made her NWSL debut on 11 April 2025 as a second-half substitute for Bianca St-Georges in a 1–0 defeat to the Portland Thorns. Bayern recalled her in July 2025 after five appearances.

=== Palmeiras ===
On 22 July 2025, Palmeiras announced Guzmán's arrival on a one-year loan from Bayern, joining a squad that included her compatriot Yoreli Rincón; she said she was "moved to be part of this beautiful family". She made her debut on 20 August, scoring in a 2–1 win over Taubaté. In June 2026 she left Bayern and signed a permanent contract with the Brazilian club.

== International career ==
=== Youth ===
Guzmán was called into Colombia's youth set-up at 13 and came to wider notice at the 2022 FIFA U-17 Women's World Cup in India, where Colombia — a side that also included Linda Caicedo — reached the final and finished as runners-up. The same year she played at the 2022 FIFA U-20 Women's World Cup in Costa Rica, where Colombia were eliminated in the quarter-finals, and won the gold medal in the football tournament at the 2022 Bolivarian Games, Colombia beating Venezuela 3–0 in the final.

=== Senior ===
Guzmán received her first call-up to the senior squad in September 2021, at the age of 16. On 4 July 2023 she was named in Colombia's squad for the 2023 FIFA Women's World Cup.

She made her senior debut in the tournament's round of 16 on 8 August 2023, coming on against Jamaica in place of the suspended Manuela Vanegas and crossing for Catalina Usme to score the only goal. Opta recorded her as the youngest player to provide an assist in a knockout match at a Women's World Cup, at 18 years and 58 days.

The knee injury she suffered that November interrupted her international career, but she returned to finish as a runner-up at the 2025 Copa América Femenina. On 10 June 2026 she scored twice — an opener in the sixth minute and the winner two minutes from time — as Colombia came from behind to beat Paraguay 4–3 in Asunción, winning the inaugural CONMEBOL Women's Nations League and securing qualification for the 2027 FIFA Women's World Cup.

=== International goals ===
Scores and results list Colombia's goal tally first.

No.	Date	Venue	Opponent	Score	Result	Competition
1.	10 June 2026	Estadio Defensores del Chaco, Asunción, Paraguay	Paraguay	1–1	4–3	2025–26 CONMEBOL Women's Nations League
2.	10 June 2026	Estadio Defensores del Chaco, Asunción, Paraguay	Paraguay	4–3	4–3	2025–26 CONMEBOL Women's Nations League

== Honours ==
Colombia

- CONMEBOL Women's Nations League: 2025–26
- Copa América Femenina runner-up: 2025

Colombia U-20

- Bolivarian Games gold medal: 2022

Colombia U-17

- FIFA U-17 Women's World Cup runner-up: 2022
