= Mayra Ramírez =

Colombian footballer (born 1999)

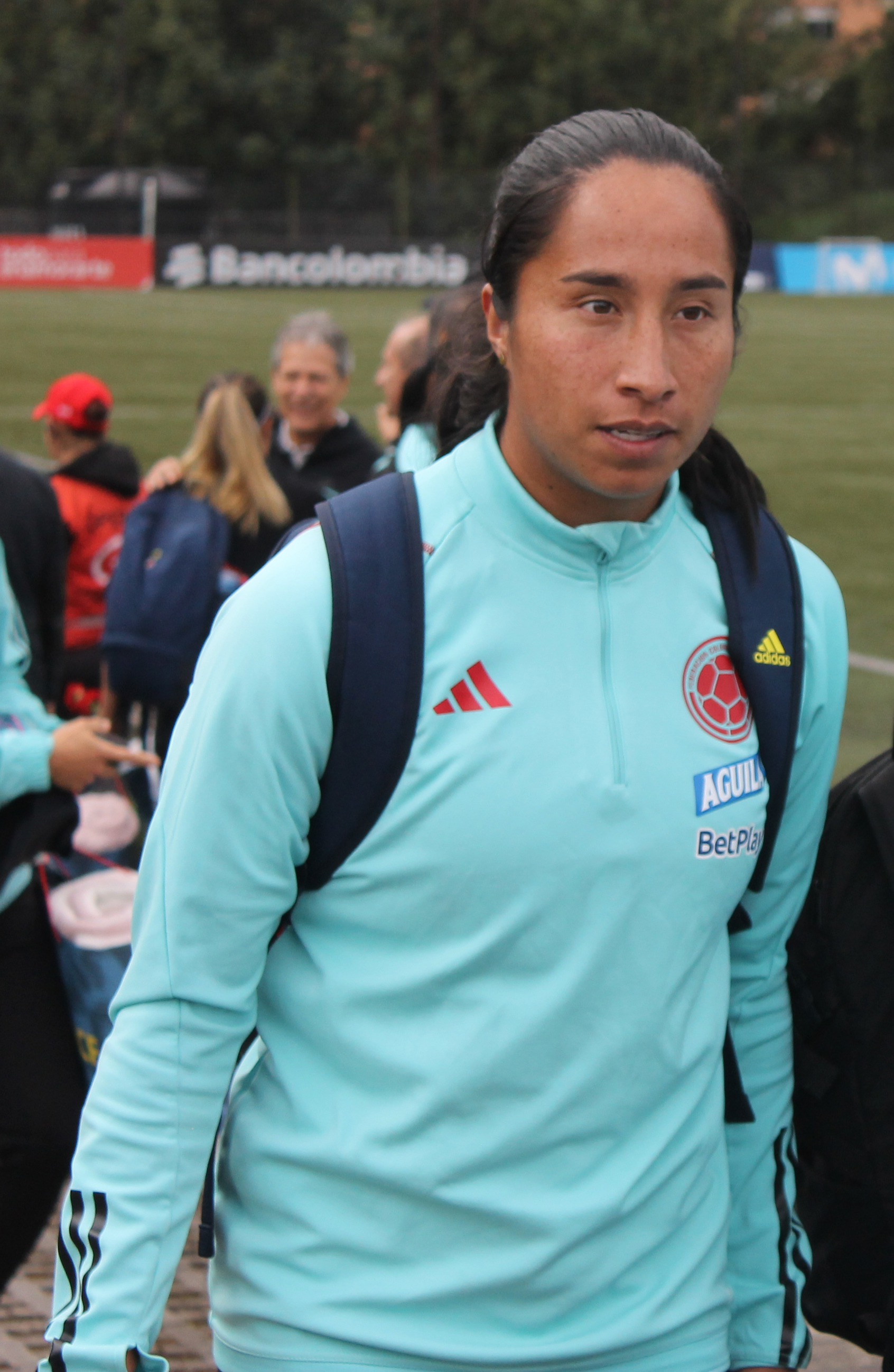
- Ramírez with Colombia in 2023

Personal information
- Full name: Mayra Tatiana Ramírez Ramírez
- Date of birth: 25 March 1999 (age 27)
- Place of birth: Sibaté, Colombia
- Height: 1.77 m (5 ft 10 in)
- Position: Striker

Team information
- Current team: Chelsea
- Number: 7

Youth career
- Real Pasión

Senior career*
Years	Team	Apps	(Gls)
2015–2016	Real Pasión		
2017	Fortaleza CEIF		
2019–2020	Independiente Medellín		
2020–2022	Sporting de Huelva	61	(12)
2022–2024	Levante	34	(20)
2024–	Chelsea	25	(7)

International career^{‡}
- Colombia U20
2018–	Colombia	65	(12)
Medal record
Women's football
Representing Colombia
CONMEBOL Women's Nations League
Winner	2025–26
Copa América Femenina
Runner-up	2022 Colombia
Runner-up	2025 Ecuador
Pan American Games
Gold medal – first place	2019 Lima	Team
- * Club domestic league appearances and goals as of 16 May 2026 ‡ National team caps and goals as of 9 June 2026

Mayra Tatiana Ramírez Ramírez (Spanish: [ˈmajɾa taˈtjana raˈmiɾes]; born 25 March 1999) (Note: Some outlets, including El Tiempo, give her date of birth as 23 March 1999.) is a Colombian professional footballer who plays as a striker for Women's Super League club Chelsea and the Colombia national team.

Ramírez began her career with Real Pasión in Funza and played in the first season of Colombia's professional women's league with Fortaleza CEIF in 2017, before spending 2019 with Independiente Medellín. She moved to Spain in 2020 to join Sporting de Huelva, with whom she reached the final of the 2022 Copa de la Reina, and signed for Levante in 2022, helping the club qualify for the UEFA Women's Champions League. In January 2024 she joined Chelsea for €450,000, then the highest transfer fee in women's football, and won the Women's Super League in her first season and again in 2024–25, when Chelsea also won the Women's FA Cup and the FA Women's League Cup. She received the 2024 Trofeo EFE as the best Ibero-American female player.

Ramírez made her senior debut for Colombia in 2018 and won gold at the 2019 Pan American Games. She played in the 2022 Copa América Femenina, where Colombia finished as runners-up, the quarter-finals of the 2023 FIFA Women's World Cup and the 2024 Summer Olympics, and the final of the 2025 Copa América Femenina, after which she was named in the team of the tournament. In 2026 she returned from a long injury for the last two matches of the inaugural CONMEBOL Women's Nations League, which Colombia won, qualifying for the 2027 FIFA Women's World Cup.

== Early life ==
Ramírez grew up in Chacua, a rural vereda of Sibaté in Cundinamarca, on the farm of her maternal grandmother while her parents worked in a flower plantation. Football ran through her family: her mother, Liseth, had been a goalkeeper, and her father, Juan Carlos, and her uncles played microfútbol, a form of indoor football, for most of their lives. According to her family, she would run onto the pitch at half-time of her father's matches and ask the referee to lend her the ball.

She played in the street with boys and began in fútbol de salón under her first coach, Gabriel Bejarano. Ramírez has said she played in a boys' team until she was 13 or 14, when she joined Real Pasión, and her father has described her as a girl among more than twenty boys.

== Youth career ==
Ramírez joined Real Pasión, an amateur club in Funza, where she was coached by Jean Albert Martínez Camargo. (Note: El País places her arrival at the club when she was ten years old, while Ramírez has said she joined after playing in boys' teams until she was 13 or 14.) The journey from Sibaté took between one and two hours each way, and she made it alone by bus, paid for with roughly 20,000 pesos a day from the shop run by her aunt; Martínez later persuaded her parents to let her live in a house he rented in Funza with the help of the local administration. At Real Pasión she won two consecutive national tournaments and the Supérate inter-school games seven times, and according to the club's own records scored more than 80 goals; her coaches developed her as a forward and goalscorer.

In 2016 she played for the Cundinamarca team that won the national women's club championship, beating Antioquia in the final, and was named the championship's top scorer. Martínez recalled that in the quarter-final against Valle she scored five second-half goals to turn a 5–0 deficit into a 6–5 win. That year she was also called up to Colombia's under-17 team for the South American Under-17 Women's Championship in Venezuela, where coach Carlos Quintero used her as a defender; according to Martínez, Colombia's only goal of the tournament came from a penalty won by Ramírez after she was moved into attack. In 2017 she won gold with Colombia's under-20 team at the Bolivarian Games.

== Club career ==
=== Fortaleza and Independiente Medellín (2017–2019) ===
Through an agreement between Real Pasión and Fortaleza CEIF, Ramírez played in 2017 in the first edition of Colombia's professional women's league, in a project directed by Martínez. After remaining with Real Pasión until the end of 2018, she signed for Independiente Medellín for the 2019 season. Medellín reached the final of the 2019 league, but Ramírez missed the second leg of the semi-final against Huila and the final series against América de Cali, who won the title, through injury.

=== Sporting de Huelva (2020–2022) ===
In 2020 Ramírez became one of the first members of the Colombia national team to move to Europe when she signed for Sporting de Huelva, saying before she left that she hoped to help the club climb away from the relegation places. Huelva finished 10th in the league in 2021–22 but reached the final of the Copa de la Reina, eliminating Atlético Madrid and Granadilla Tenerife on the way. Ramírez scored a penalty in the round-of-32 win over Real Oviedo on 26 January 2022 and scored again in the 2–1 win over Atlético Madrid in the round of 16 on 3 March. Barcelona won the final 6–1 on 29 May 2022.

=== Levante (2022–2024) ===
Ramírez joined Levante in July 2022 on a three-year contract, remaining in Spain's top flight. She became a regular starter in her first season and formed an attacking partnership with Alba Redondo, the league's top scorer. She scored twice in a 5–0 win over Levante Las Planas on 11 February 2023, and finished the 2022–23 Liga F season with 14 goals and 11 assists in 27 league matches, the third-highest assist tally in the league, as Levante qualified for the Champions League.

=== Chelsea (2024–present) ===
==== 2023–24 ====
On 26 January 2024, Chelsea announced that Ramírez had signed on a four-and-a-half-year contract. Levante reported that the fee was €450,000, making her the most expensive signing in women's football at the time; further add-ons of up to €50,000 were reported.

She made her debut on 27 January 2024 in a 3–0 away win over Brighton & Hove Albion, replacing Lauren James in the second half. Her first goal, on her third appearance, was a back-heeled finish that gave Chelsea a 1–0 win over Crystal Palace in the FA Cup on 11 February, and supporters soon adopted a chant about her strength. She scored her first league goal on 3 March in a 4–0 win over Leicester City, and opened her European account in the second leg of the Champions League quarter-final against Ajax, scoring after 33 minutes of a tie Chelsea won 4–1 on aggregate. On the final day of the season, 18 May 2024, she scored two goals and provided two assists in a 6–0 win over Manchester United that gave Chelsea the WSL title.

==== 2024–25 ====
Under new head coach Sonia Bompastor, Ramírez started the 2024–25 season as Chelsea's first-choice striker. She scored after four minutes from a corner in a win away at Arsenal in the fourth round of the league season, and on 8 October headed her first goal of that season's Champions League in a 3–2 win over Real Madrid at Stamford Bridge. In November she broke clear of Manchester City's defence to score the first goal of a 2–0 win that took Chelsea to the top of the league, a goal later ranked third in a fan vote of the club's best goals of the season. She added a goal in a 6–1 Champions League win over Twente in December.

In January 2025 EFE presented her with the Trofeo EFE for the best Ibero-American female player of 2024 at Chelsea's Cobham training ground. On 16 February she scored the equaliser in a 2–1 comeback win over Everton, and on 15 March she opened the scoring after eight minutes of the League Cup final at Pride Park, in which Chelsea beat Manchester City 2–1.

Chelsea trailed Manchester City 2–0 after the first leg of their Champions League quarter-final, and in the second leg on 27 March Ramírez scored in the 43rd minute of a 3–0 win that sent Chelsea through 3–2 on aggregate. Barcelona eliminated Chelsea in the semi-finals. Chelsea clinched a sixth consecutive league title on 30 April 2025 with a 1–0 win at Manchester United, and completed a domestic treble on 18 May with a 3–0 win over United in the FA Cup final at Wembley, in which Ramírez started and played 62 minutes.

Ramírez was nominated for the 2024 Ballon d'Or and finished 21st with 36 points.

==== 2025–present ====
On 30 August 2025 Ramírez left the field after 34 minutes of a pre-season friendly against AC Milan with a hamstring injury, and Chelsea confirmed three days later that she had undergone successful surgery and would miss the rest of 2025. A return planned for early 2026 was delayed in February by a calf problem during rehabilitation, and in March Bompastor said she might not play again that season after a further setback. She returned to competitive action on 16 May 2026, in Chelsea's final league match against Manchester United, 287 days after her previous match. In August 2026 she joined Chelsea's pre-season tour of New Zealand and Australia.

== International career ==
=== Youth ===
Ramírez was first called up by Colombia in 2016 for the South American Under-17 Women's Championship in Venezuela, and in 2017 won gold with the under-20 team at the Bolivarian Games.

=== Senior ===
==== 2018–2021 ====
Ramírez made her senior debut on 19 July 2018 in a 1–0 defeat to Costa Rica at the Central American and Caribbean Games in Barranquilla, where Colombia finished outside the medals. She scored her first international goal in a 4–0 friendly win over Peru in Lima on 8 April 2019. Later that year she won gold at the 2019 Pan American Games in Lima, where Colombia beat Argentina on penalties in the final.

==== 2022 Copa América ====
Coach Nelson Abadía called Ramírez up for the 2022 Copa América Femenina, hosted by Colombia, on 3 July 2022. She started the opening match against Paraguay on 8 July and scored Colombia's second goal, a header, in a 4–2 win; she came on in the 58th minute of the win over Bolivia and started against Ecuador, scoring in a 2–1 win on 17 July. Colombia lost the final 1–0 to Brazil, and reaching the final secured the team's qualification for the 2023 World Cup.

==== 2023 World Cup ====
Ramírez was named in Colombia's squad for the 2023 FIFA Women's World Cup on 4 July 2023, and played in each of her team's five matches. She started the opening 2–0 win over South Korea as the central striker, spending much of the match holding up play and helping the midfield defensively, and carried a knock to her knee from the 2–1 win over Germany through the group-stage loss to Morocco and the round-of-16 win over Jamaica, after a scan found no serious damage. Colombia, who topped their group, were eliminated in the quarter-finals by England.

==== 2024 Olympics ====
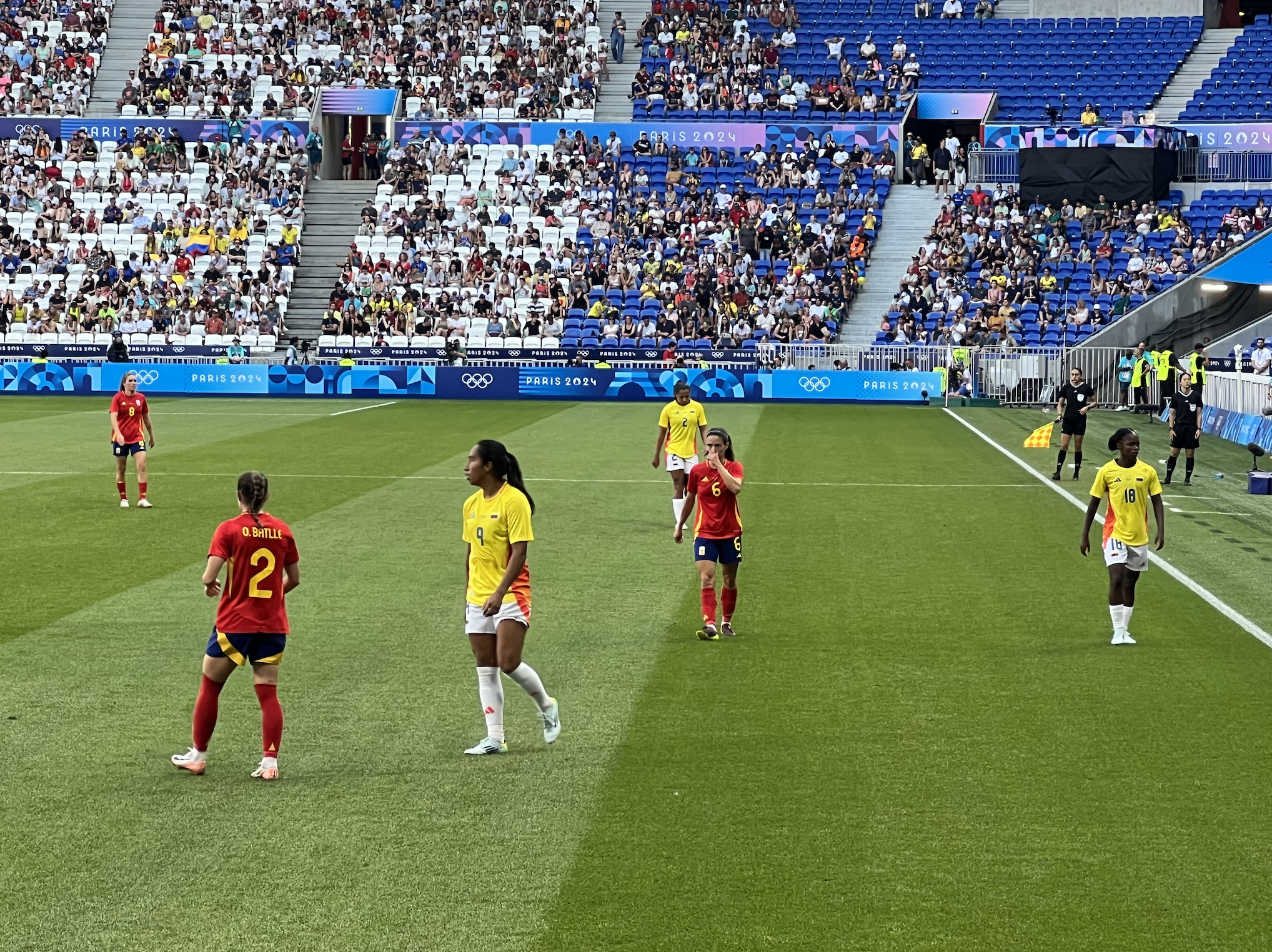
Ramírez (n°9) playing against Spain at the Summer Olympics in 2024

On 5 July 2024 Ramírez was called up for the 2024 Summer Olympics. She started the opening 3–2 defeat to France and was sent off for a foul on Selma Bacha, which brought a two-match suspension; the Colombian federation's appeal was rejected, and she missed the 2–0 win over New Zealand and the 1–0 defeat to Canada that still carried Colombia into the knockout stage. Colombia reached the Olympic quarter-finals for the first time.

Back from suspension, Ramírez opened the scoring against Spain in Lyon on 3 August after 12 minutes, and Leicy Santos made it 2–0 shortly after half-time; Spain equalised in stoppage time of normal time and won 4–2 on penalties after a 2–2 draw.

==== 2025 Copa América ====
At the 2025 Copa América Femenina in Ecuador, Ramírez scored Colombia's second goal, in the 57th minute, of a 4–1 win over Paraguay on 19 July, then scored and set up two goals in an 8–0 win over Bolivia three days later. Colombia beat Argentina 5–4 on penalties after a 0–0 draw in the semi-final, which also secured qualification for the 2028 Summer Olympics. In the final against Brazil on 2 August, Ramírez scored in a 4–4 draw, and Brazil won the shoot-out 5–4. She finished the tournament with three goals and four assists, more direct goal contributions than any other Colombian, and was named in the CONMEBOL team of the tournament alongside Linda Caicedo and Katherine Tapia.

==== 2026 Nations League ====
Ramírez did not play for Colombia between the Copa América final and June 2026 because of her injury, and missed most of the inaugural CONMEBOL Women's Nations League. Coach Ángelo Marsiglia recalled her for the last two rounds, in which Colombia needed results to qualify directly for the 2027 FIFA Women's World Cup. She came on in the 55th minute of the 1–0 win over Uruguay at the Estadio Olímpico Pascual Guerrero on 5 June, which secured Colombia's place at the World Cup, and had a goal-bound counter-attack for Leicy Santos ruled out by the video assistant referee. Four days later she played until the 77th minute of Colombia's 4–3 win away to Paraguay in Asunción, a comeback that made Colombia the first champions of the competition.

== Style of play ==
Ramírez is a tall, physically powerful centre-forward who uses her strength to hold up the ball as a pivot, win aerial duels and press and track back for her team. Chelsea describe her as a forward who can play anywhere across the front line, and she has also been used on the right wing, from where she has driven into the area to lay on chances for teammates. Her ability to run in behind defences suited Chelsea's counter-attacking play in 2024–25, when she recorded eight fast breaks, more than any other player in the squad. Her first coach recalled that she has struck the ball hard since childhood.

== Career statistics ==
=== Club ===
As of match played 16 May 2026

Appearances and goals by club, season and competition
Club	Season	League			National cup (Note: Includes Copa de la Reina, Women's FA Cup)		League cup (Note: Includes FA Women's League Cup)		Continental		Total	
Club	Season	Division	Apps	Goals	Apps	Goals	Apps	Goals	Apps	Goals	Apps	Goals
Sporting Huelva	2020–21	Primera División	32	8	—		—		—		32	8
Sporting Huelva	2021–22	Primera División	29	4	3	2	—		—		32	6
Sporting Huelva	Total		61	12	3	2	—		—		64	14
Levante	2022–23	Liga F	27	14	1	1	—		0	0	28	15
Levante	2023–24	Liga F	7	6	1	1	—		2 (Note: Appearances in UEFA Women's Champions League)	0	10	7
Levante	Total		34	20	2	2	—		2	0	38	22
Chelsea	2023–24	Women's Super League	7	3	2	1	2	0	2	1	13	5
Chelsea	2024–25	Women's Super League	17	4	5	2	2	1	9	3	33	10
Chelsea	2025–26	Women's Super League	1	0	0	0	0	0	0	0	1	0
Chelsea	Total		25	7	7	3	4	1	11	4	47	15
Career total			120	39	12	7	4	1	13	4	149	51

=== International ===
As of 9 June 2026

Scores and results list Colombia's goal tally first, score column indicates score after each Ramírez goal.

List of international goals scored by Mayra Ramírez
No.	Date	Venue	Opponent	Score	Result	Competition
1	8 April 2019	Estadio San Marcos, Lima, Peru	Peru	1–0	4–0	Friendly
2	16 May 2019	Estadio Nacional Julio Martínez Prádanos, Santiago, Chile	Chile	1–0	2–0	Friendly
3	20 February 2022	Estadio Olímpico Pascual Guerrero, Cali, Colombia	Argentina	2–1	2–2	Friendly
4	8 July 2022	Estadio Olímpico Pascual Guerrero, Cali, Colombia	Paraguay	2–1	4–2	2022 Copa América Femenina
5	17 July 2022	Estadio Olímpico Pascual Guerrero, Cali, Colombia	Ecuador	1–0	2–1	2022 Copa América Femenina
6	12 November 2022	Estadio Olímpico Pascual Guerrero, Cali, Colombia	Zambia	1–0	1–0	Friendly
7	15 November 2022	Estadio Olímpico Pascual Guerrero, Cali, Colombia	Zambia	1–0	1–0	Friendly
8	9 April 2024	Hinchliffe Stadium, Paterson, United States	Guatemala	2–0	3–0	Friendly
9	3 August 2024	Stade de Lyon, Décines-Charpieu, France	Spain	1–0	2–2 (a.e.t.) (2–4 p)	2024 Summer Olympics
10	19 July 2025	Estadio Gonzalo Pozo Ripalda, Quito, Ecuador	Paraguay	2–0	4–1	2025 Copa América Femenina
11	22 July 2025	Estadio Gonzalo Pozo Ripalda, Quito, Ecuador	Bolivia	2–0	8–0	2025 Copa América Femenina
12	2 August 2025	Estadio Rodrigo Paz Delgado, Quito, Ecuador	Brazil	3–2	4–4 (a.e.t.) (4–5 p)	2025 Copa América Femenina

== Honours ==
Sporting de Huelva

- Copa de la Reina runner-up: 2021–22

Chelsea

- Women's Super League: 2023–24, 2024–25
- Women's FA Cup: 2024–25
- FA Women's League Cup: 2024–25

Colombia

- Bolivarian Games: 2017 (under-20)
- Pan American Games: 2019
- Copa América Femenina runner-up: 2022, 2025
- CONMEBOL Women's Nations League: 2025–26

Individual

- Trofeo EFE: 2024
- Copa América Femenina team of the tournament: 2025
