= Catalina Pérez (footballer, born 1994) =

Colombian footballer (born 1994)

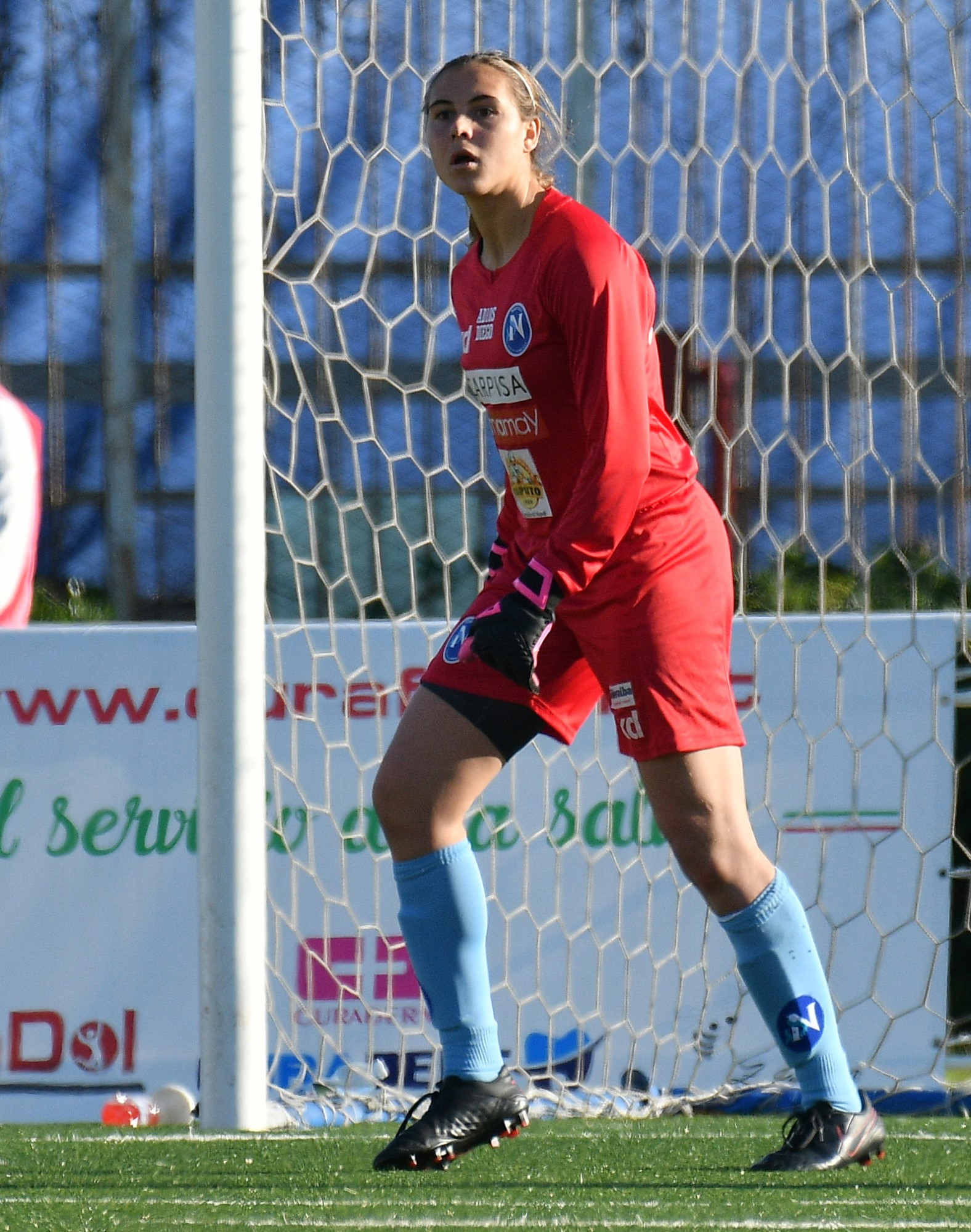
- Pérez with Napoli in 2020

Personal information
- Full name: Catalina Pérez Jaramillo
- Date of birth: 8 November 1994 (age 32)
- Place of birth: Bogotá, Colombia
- Height: 1.73 m (5 ft 8 in)
- Position: Goalkeeper

Youth career
- 2003–2012: Team Boca

College career
Years	Team	Apps	(Gls)
2013–2016	Miami	18	(0)
2017	Mississippi State	18	(0)

Senior career*
Years	Team	Apps	(Gls)
2019	New England Mutiny	1	(0)
2020	Fiorentina	0	(0)
2020–2021	Napoli	10	(0)
2021–2022	Real Betis	3	(0)
2023	Avaí	7	(0)
2023–2025	Werder Bremen	2	(0)
2025–2026	Racing Strasbourg	0	(0)

International career^{‡}
2010–2011	Colombia U20	0	(0)
2015–	Colombia	20	(0)
Medal record
Women's football
Representing Colombia
Copa América Femenina
Runner-up	2022 Colombia
Runner-up	2025 Ecuador
Pan American Games
Gold medal – first place	2019 Lima	Team
- * Club domestic league appearances and goals as of 22 September 2026 ‡ National team caps and goals as of 18 July 2023

Catalina Pérez Jaramillo (born 8 November 1994) is a Colombian professional footballer who plays as a goalkeeper for the Colombia women's national team.

Born in Bogotá and raised in Florida, Pérez played college soccer for Miami and Mississippi State, where she was named an All-American in 2017. After a spell away from the professional game—during which she completed an MBA and worked in banking in Boston—she returned to football with the New England Mutiny in 2019 and subsequently played in Italy, Spain, Brazil, Germany and France.

Pérez was sent off on her World Cup debut in 2015, but returned eight years later as Colombia's first-choice goalkeeper at the 2023 tournament, where the team reached the quarter-finals and conceded only two goals in four matches, neither from open play. She won a gold medal at the 2019 Pan American Games, was a runner-up at the Copa América Femenina in 2022 and 2025, and was part of the squad that won the inaugural CONMEBOL Women's Nations League in 2026.

== Early life ==
Pérez was born in Bogotá and moved with her family to Boca Raton, Florida, as a young child. She has said that watching an older brother play drew her to the game as a small child. (Note: Pérez's own website says she was drawn to football at the age of four; ESPN reported in 2015 that she began playing at eight.) She spent her youth career with Team Boca, the competitive arm of the Soccer Association of Boca Raton, and attended Saint Andrew's School, graduating in 2013.

== College career ==
Pérez played four seasons for the Miami Hurricanes between 2013 and 2016, making 18 appearances, before transferring to Mississippi State as a graduate student for the 2017 season.

Her single season in the Southeastern Conference was the most productive of her college career: she kept six clean sheets, won nine matches, and was named an All-American and to the First-Team All-SEC side. Her career goals-against average of 1.00 remains the second-best in Mississippi State history.

== Club career ==
=== New England Mutiny ===
Pérez stepped away from professional football after college and, following an injury in 2018, took an MBA and began working for a bank in Boston. She was drawn back into the game in 2019 by Joe Ferrara, managing director of the United Women's Soccer club New England Mutiny, who told her: "Why don't you play for us? You've got your whole life to work." She also appeared for Team Boca Blast in the Women's Premier Soccer League.

=== Italy and Spain ===
In January 2020 Pérez joined Fiorentina in Serie A, but the season was curtailed by the COVID-19 pandemic and she did not make a competitive appearance.

Her transfer to Napoli was announced on 25 July 2020. She debuted on 27 September in a Coppa Italia tie against US Città di Pontedera, a 1–0 win, and made ten appearances across the campaign.

She moved to Real Betis of Spain's Liga F in 2021, making three league appearances over the following season, and spent 2023 in Brazil with Avaí.

=== Werder Bremen ===
Pérez joined Frauen-Bundesliga club Werder Bremen in July 2023, shortly before the World Cup.

On 25 January 2024 the club announced that she had torn the anterior cruciate ligament in her right knee in training. Coach Thomas Horsch said she "also wanted to represent Colombia at the Olympic Games. Unfortunately, she will now miss this great objective." Pérez opted for conservative treatment rather than surgery in an attempt to be fit for the Games. She made two Bundesliga appearances in two seasons at Bremen and struggled for continuity after the injury, which prompted her departure.

=== Racing Strasbourg ===
In August 2025 Pérez signed for Première Ligue club Racing Strasbourg on a contract to June 2026, becoming the club's tenth signing of the summer and the only South American goalkeeper on its books. She said the move was intended to restore her match rhythm and her claim on the Colombia jersey, Katherine Tapia having established herself as first choice.

== International career ==
=== Youth ===
At 15, Pérez was named in Colombia's squad for the 2010 FIFA U-20 Women's World Cup in Germany, where the team reached the semi-finals and finished fourth, though she did not play. She was also part of Colombia's squad at the 2011 Pan American Games in Guadalajara.

=== 2015 World Cup ===
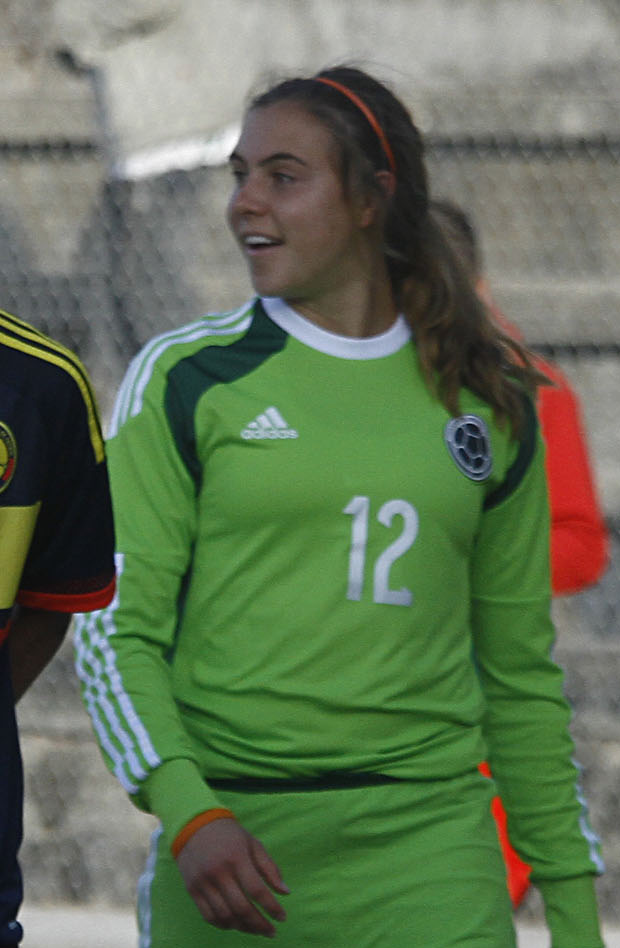
Pérez with Colombia in 2015

Pérez was selected in Colombia's squad for the 2015 FIFA Women's World Cup on 20 May 2015. She did not feature in the group stage, but made her World Cup debut in the round of 16 against the United States on 22 June, deputising for the suspended Sandra Sepúlveda.

Her involvement lasted 47 minutes. Moments into the second half she brought down Alex Morgan in the penalty area and was sent off. Abby Wambach missed the resulting penalty, but the United States used their numerical advantage to win 2–0 and eliminate Colombia.

=== Olympics and Pan American gold ===
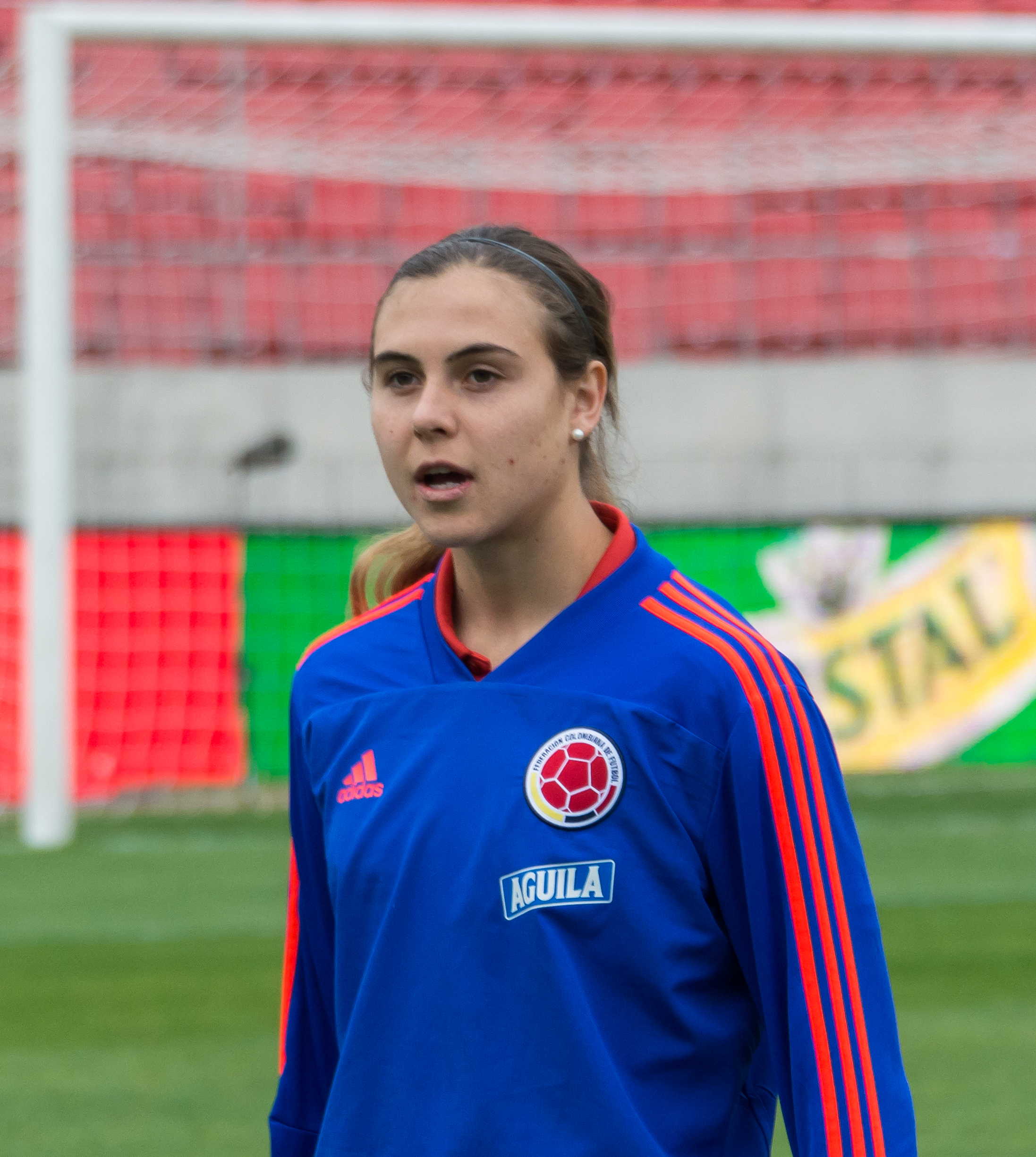
Pérez with Colombia in 2019

Pérez was called up for the 2016 Summer Olympics on 14 July 2016.

She was part of the Colombia side that won the gold medal in the women's football tournament at the 2019 Pan American Games in Lima.

=== 2022 Copa América and 2023 World Cup ===
On 3 July 2022 Pérez was named in the squad for the 2022 Copa América Femenina, which Colombia hosted and finished as runners-up.

Named in the squad for the 2023 FIFA Women's World Cup on 4 July 2023, Pérez started every match as Colombia reached the quarter-finals, their best performance at the tournament. Colombia beat South Korea 2–0, upset Germany 2–1 and defeated Jamaica 1–0 in the round of 16, conceding only twice in four matches and never from open play; against Morocco, Pérez saved a penalty from Anissa Lahmari, who converted the rebound.

=== Injury and Nations League title ===
On 25 January 2024, five months after the World Cup, Pérez tore the anterior cruciate ligament in her right knee in training at Werder Bremen. She was nonetheless named in Colombia's squad for the 2024 Summer Olympics on 5 July 2024, but a meniscus injury sustained in training with the national team left her short of fitness and she did not play at the Games, where Katherine Tapia started and Sandra Sepúlveda deputised.

She returned to the squad for the 2025 Copa América Femenina, where Colombia again finished as runners-up, and was named in Colombia's squad for the closing matches of the 2025–26 CONMEBOL Women's Nations League. Colombia won the competition on the final matchday on 9 June 2026, beating Paraguay 4–3 in Asunción to finish two points clear of Argentina, taking the inaugural title and direct qualification for the 2027 FIFA Women's World Cup.

== Outside football ==
After an injury in 2018 interrupted her playing career, Pérez completed an MBA and worked for Banco Santander in Boston before returning to the game the following year.

== Honours ==
Colombia

- CONMEBOL Women's Nations League: 2025–26
- Pan American Games gold medal: 2019
- Copa América Femenina runner-up: 2022, 2025

Individual

- NSCAA All-American: 2017
- First-team All-SEC: 2017
