= Katherine Tapia =

Colombian footballer (born 1992)

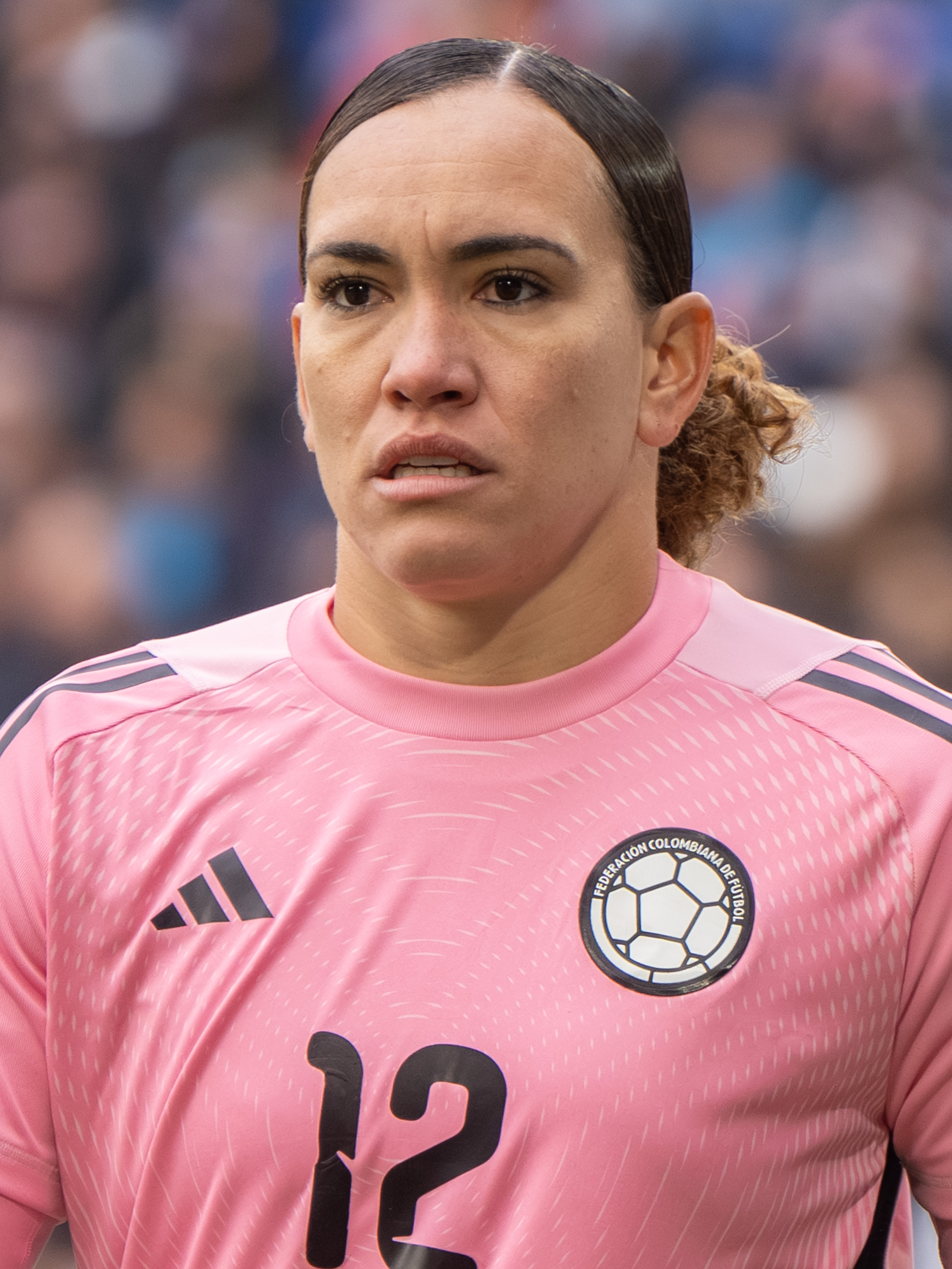
- Tapia with Colombia in 2026

Personal information
- Full name: Luz Katherine Tapia Ramírez
- Date of birth: 7 December 1992 (age 33)
- Place of birth: Santa Cruz de Lorica, Colombia
- Height: 1.78 m (5 ft 10 in)
- Position: Goalkeeper

Team information
- Current team: Palmeiras
- Number: 25

Senior career*
Years	Team	Apps	(Gls)
2018–2020	Atlético Nacional		
2020–2021	América de Cali	9+	(0)
2021–2022	Santa Fe		
2022–2023	Santiago Morning		
2023–	Palmeiras	15	(0)

International career^{‡}
2022–	Colombia	25	(0)
Medal record
Women's football
Representing Colombia
CONMEBOL Women's Nations League
Gold medal – first place	2025–26
Copa América Femenina
Silver medal – second place	2025 Ecuador
- * Club domestic league appearances and goals as of 13 March 2025 ‡ National team caps and goals as of 2 August 2025

Luz Katherine Tapia Ramírez (born 7 December 1992), also known as Kate Tapia, is a Colombian footballer who plays as a goalkeeper for Série A1 club Palmeiras and the Colombia national team.

Tapia served for several years with ESMAD, the riot squad of the National Police of Colombia, and was working as a security escort for Atlético Nacional when she was recruited by the club's women's team. She reached the final of the 2020 Copa Libertadores with América de Cali, saving two penalties in the semi-final shootout against Corinthians, spent a season in Chile with Santiago Morning, and joined Palmeiras in 2023, winning the Copa do Brasil and the Supercopa among other titles.

An injury cost Tapia a place at the 2023 FIFA Women's World Cup, but she became Colombia's first-choice goalkeeper and was named the best goalkeeper of the 2025 Copa América Femenina, in which Colombia finished as runners-up. She was nominated for the IFFHS world's best woman goalkeeper award for 2025 and kept goal as Colombia won the inaugural CONMEBOL Women's Nations League in June 2026.

== Early life ==
Tapia was born on 7 December 1992 in Santa Cruz de Lorica, in Córdoba, and was raised in the rural settlement of Las Flores nearby. Her parents did not support her wish to play football; her grandfather, José Joaquín, covered for her, and she funded her own boots and equipment by saving her lunch money and minding children. With no girls' teams nearby, she played in school tournaments against boys. She finished school at 14 after skipping two years and enrolled at the University of Córdoba. Travelling back from a match in Caucasia, she and her companions were stopped and held for a time by an armed group at Nechí.

Tapia began as an outfield player and was moved into goal by the coach Diego Rodríguez Toro at Gol Star in Bogotá, who thought her height suited the position.

== Police career ==
Tapia joined the National Police of Colombia and served with its Mobile Anti-Disturbance Squadron (ESMAD), spending about five years in the unit and working security at football stadiums, including as part of the escort for Atlético Nacional's men's team. She has said that sport changed her life "drastically", and that pulling on the police uniform produced the same adrenaline she now feels on the pitch. In August 2025, after the Copa América, she was given a special commendation by the unit, by then renamed the UNDMO.

== Club career ==
=== Atlético Nacional ===
Tapia was recruited by Atlético Nacional after impressing the coach Diego Bedoya in a match, joining the women's team of the club whose men's side she had escorted as a police officer. On 17 October 2020 she converted a penalty against Real Santander, reported as the first goal scored by a goalkeeper in Colombia's professional women's league.

=== América de Cali ===
Tapia joined América de Cali for the 2020 Copa Libertadores Femenina, which was postponed and played in Argentina in March 2021. In the semi-final on 17 March, she saved two spot-kicks as América beat the holders Corinthians 4–3 on penalties following a 1–1 draw, sending a Colombian club to the final of the competition for the first time. América lost the final 2–1 to Ferroviária.

=== Independiente Santa Fe ===
Tapia played for Independiente Santa Fe between 2021 and 2022.

=== Santiago Morning ===
In January 2022, Tapia signed for Chilean club Santiago Morning. She was the club's first-choice goalkeeper for the 2022 season and was voted the league's best goalkeeper at that year's Premios FutFem.

=== Palmeiras ===
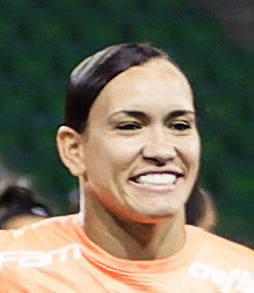
Tapia with for Palmeiras in 2023

On 9 January 2023, Tapia was announced by Palmeiras, then the reigning Copa Libertadores Femenina champions. She won the Campeonato Paulista in 2024 and 2025, and in 2025 also won the Copa do Brasil, the club's first, and the Brasil Ladies Cup.

In the 2026 Supercopa do Brasil final in February 2026, Tapia saved three penalties — from Gabi Zanotti, Jhonson and Tamires — as Palmeiras beat Corinthians in a shootout after a 1–1 draw to win the competition for the first time.

== International career ==
Tapia was part of Nelson Abadía's plans for the 2023 FIFA Women's World Cup but withdrew after an injury sustained on 29 May 2023, saying that she had worked "hours and hours" in double sessions to recover but had to stop and think about her health. On 5 July 2024, she was called up for the 2024 Summer Olympics. She became Colombia's first-choice goalkeeper following a serious injury to Catalina Pérez.

At the 2025 Copa América Femenina in Ecuador, Tapia played six matches and saved a penalty in the semi-final against Argentina to send Colombia to the final, which Brazil won on penalties. CONMEBOL named her the tournament's best goalkeeper, the first Colombian woman to receive the award. In October 2025 she was one of ten goalkeepers nominated by the IFFHS for its world's best woman goalkeeper award.

Tapia playing against the United States in March 2026

Tapia started in goal on 10 June 2026 as Colombia beat Paraguay 4–3 in Asunción to win the inaugural CONMEBOL Women's Nations League. Colombia finished the competition unbeaten, with six wins and two draws, and had already secured qualification for the 2027 FIFA Women's World Cup and the 2028 Summer Olympics.

== Honours ==
América de Cali

- Copa Libertadores Femenina runner-up: 2020

Palmeiras

- Campeonato Paulista de Futebol Feminino: 2024, 2025
- Copa do Brasil de Futebol Feminino: 2025
- Brasil Ladies Cup: 2025
- Supercopa do Brasil de Futebol Feminino: 2026

Colombia

- CONMEBOL Women's Nations League: 2025–26
- Copa América Femenina runner-up: 2025

Individual

- Premios FutFem best goalkeeper: 2022
- Copa América Femenina best goalkeeper: 2025
