= Daniela Montoya =

Colombian footballer (born 1990)

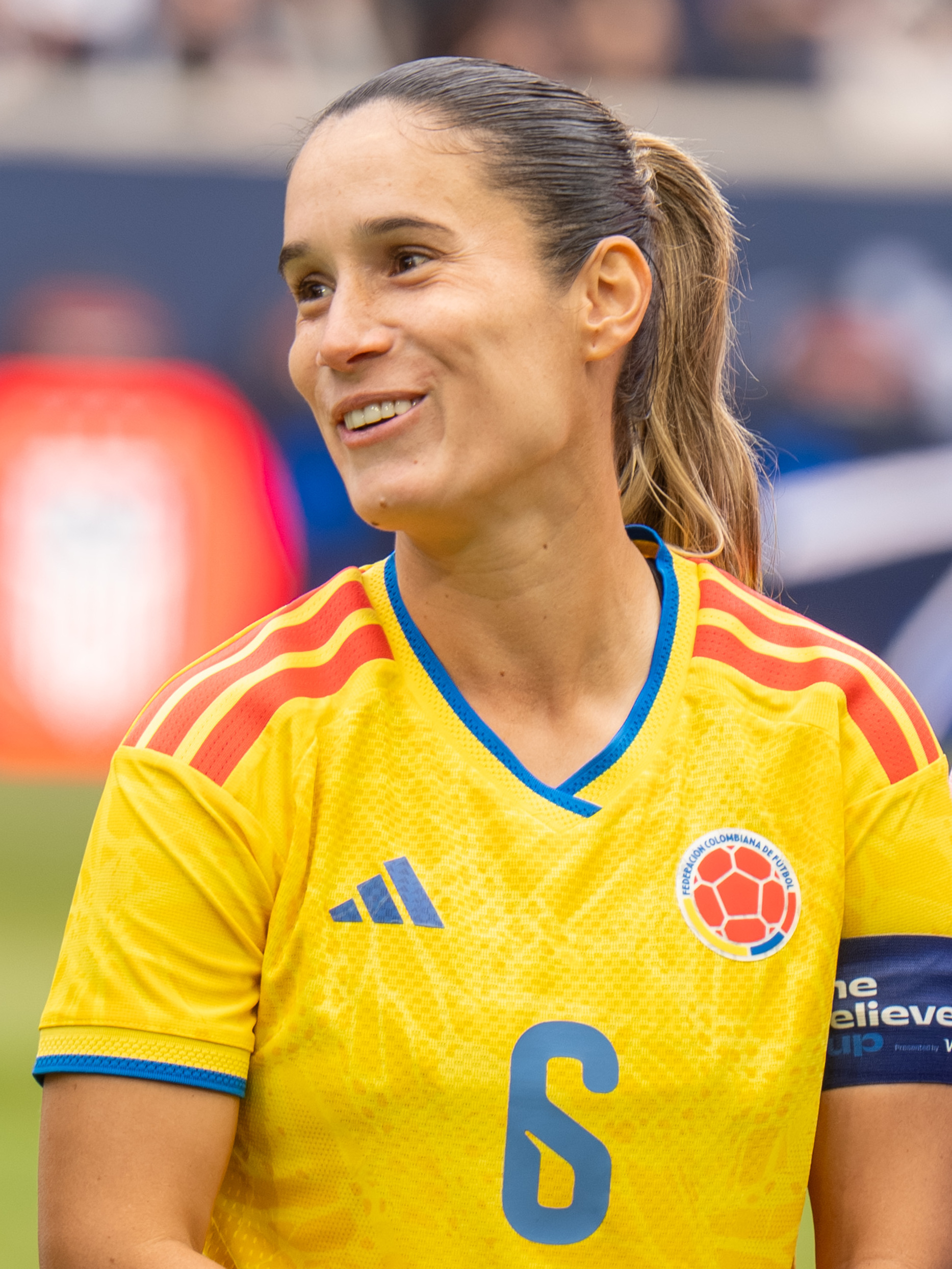
- Montoya in 2026

Personal information
- Full name: Daniela Montoya Quiroz
- Date of birth: 22 August 1990 (age 36)
- Place of birth: Medellín, Colombia
- Height: 1.60 m (5 ft 3 in)
- Position: Midfielder

Team information
- Current team: Alianza Lima

Senior career*
| Years | Team | Apps | (Gls) |
- Formas Íntimas
| 2013–2014 | CD Burela FS (futsal) | | |
| 2016 | Levante | 11 | (0) |
| 2017–2018 | Envigado | | |
| 2019– | Junior | | |
| 2019 | → Al-Riffa (loan) | 0 | (0) |
| 2021 | Independiente Medellín | 10 | (2) |
| 2022 | Junior | 15 | (3) |
| 2023–2024 | Atlético Nacional | 18 | (8) |
| 2025–2026 | Grêmio | 28 | (0) |
| 2026– | Alianza Lima | | |

International career^{‡}
| 2010 | Colombia U20 | 5 | (2) |
| 2010– | Colombia | 64 | (6) |
- Colombia futsal
Medal record
Women's football
Representing Colombia
CONMEBOL Women's Nations League
| Gold medal – first place | 2025–26 |
Copa América Femenina
| Runner-up | 2010 Ecuador |
| Runner-up | 2014 Ecuador |
| Runner-up | 2022 Colombia |
| Silver medal – second place | 2025 Ecuador |
Pan American Games
| Gold medal – first place | 2019 Lima | Team |
| Silver medal – second place | 2015 Toronto | Team |
- * Club domestic league appearances and goals ‡ National team caps and goals as of 18 July 2023

Daniela Montoya Quiroz (born 22 August 1990) is a Colombian footballer who plays as a midfielder for Primera División club Alianza Lima and captains the Colombia national team.

Raised in Sabaneta, Montoya spent the first part of her career with Formas Íntimas of Medellín, playing in seven editions of the Copa Libertadores Femenina, and also had a successful career in futsal, scoring regularly for Burela in Spain. She has since played club football in Colombia, Spain, Bahrain, Brazil and Peru.

A Colombia international since 2010, Montoya has appeared at three editions of the FIFA Women's World Cup — 2011, 2015 and 2023 — and at the 2012 and 2024 Olympic tournaments. Her goal against Mexico in 2015 was the first Colombia had scored at a Women's World Cup. She was subsequently left out of the national team for around 18 months after publicly criticising the Colombian Football Federation over unpaid bonuses, and returned to win gold at the 2019 Pan American Games, finish as a runner-up at four editions of the Copa América Femenina, captain Colombia to the quarter-finals of the 2023 World Cup, and win the inaugural CONMEBOL Women's Nations League in 2026.

== Early life ==
Montoya was born on 22 August 1990 in Medellín and grew up in the Holanda neighbourhood of Sabaneta, in Antioquia. Her father, Juan Guillermo Montoya, had played as a midfielder for Sabaneta's municipal side, and her mother is Martha Quiroz; she is the youngest of five sisters and has a twin, Daryi, born ten minutes before her.

She began playing in the street at around the age of seven and joined the local youth club Visión 2020, taking part in a boys' tournament in southern Sabaneta as the only girl in it. She has said that at the time "people didn't approve of me playing", and she was subjected to slurs about girls playing football. She later studied sport at the Politécnico Colombiano Jaime Isaza Cadavid.

== Club career ==
=== Formas Íntimas ===
Montoya came through and spent the early part of her career at Formas Íntimas of Medellín, for many years the dominant club in Antioquia and a regular in continental competition. She played in seven editions of the Copa Libertadores Femenina between 2009 and 2015, finishing third in 2009 and reaching the final in 2013, and won four consecutive Copa Pre-Libertadores titles from 2012 to 2015. She also represented Antioquia at the Colombian National Games, winning gold in 2008 and silver in 2012.

=== Futsal ===
Alongside her football career, Montoya played futsal to a high level. She co-founded the team Futsasa with her twin sister in 2008 and played for Paisitas de Antioquia before moving to Spain to join Burela of Galicia, where she scored 11 goals in 19 matches, won the Copa de la Xunta de Galicia and finished as a runner-up in the Spanish league; her scoring earned her the nickname "la bombardera". She has also been capped by Colombia's national futsal team.

=== Levante ===
Montoya returned to Spain in 2016 to play football for Levante, making 11 league appearances.

=== Colombian clubs and Al-Riffa ===
Back in Colombia, Montoya played for Envigado and then Junior of Barranquilla. In 2019 she had a brief spell in Bahrain with Al-Riffa, for whom she scored once in four matches at the 2019 WAFF Women's Clubs Championship. She later played ten league matches for Independiente Medellín, scoring twice, and returned to Junior in 2022, scoring three times in 15 appearances.

=== Atlético Nacional ===
Montoya joined Atlético Nacional in 2023, a move Colombian media framed as a blow for Junior. Playing further forward than earlier in her career, she scored eight goals in 18 league appearances across two seasons.

=== Grêmio ===
On 3 February 2025, Montoya signed for Grêmio of the Série A1, on a contract to the end of December 2025 that renewed automatically if she met agreed targets for playing time and goal involvement. She helped the club win the Campeonato Gaúcho in 2025, and the renewal clause was triggered that November. On 10 July 2026, after 28 appearances without scoring, club and player agreed to terminate the contract.

=== Alianza Lima ===
On 4 August 2026, Montoya joined Peruvian club Alianza Lima for the closing tournament of the season. She said the club's plans for its women's team had persuaded her: "The project convinced me most. I felt this club believes in women's football and wants to compete at the highest level." Sisy Quiroz, the club's head of women's football, said her leadership would strengthen the squad.

== International career ==
=== Early years ===
Montoya played for Colombia at the 2010 FIFA U-20 Women's World Cup in Germany, scoring twice against Costa Rica, and made her senior debut the same year. She was a runner-up at the 2010 South American Women's Football Championship, scoring against Uruguay, and went on to play at the 2011 FIFA Women's World Cup, where Colombia were eliminated in the group stage, and at the 2012 Summer Olympics in London, appearing in two of the three matches.

=== 2014–2015 ===
Montoya was a runner-up again at the 2014 Copa América Femenina and won silver at the 2014 Central American and Caribbean Games, where she scored in the semi-final against Venezuela. She took a second Pan American Games silver medal at the 2015 Games in Toronto.

At the 2015 FIFA Women's World Cup in Canada, Montoya scored in a 1–1 draw with Mexico on 9 June 2015 — the first goal Colombia had scored at a Women's World Cup. The BBC likened the long-range strike to James Rodríguez's goals at the men's tournament a year earlier.

=== Exclusion from the national team ===
After the 2015 World Cup, Montoya publicly criticised the Colombian Football Federation over unpaid bonuses and the conditions in which the squad worked. She was left out of Colombia's preparations for the 2016 Summer Olympics and went roughly 18 months without a call-up, having been a fixture in the side for a decade. In a 2019 interview with El Tiempo she described writing to federation officials seeking an explanation, and said the players did not want "war" but wanted to build something; she also questioned the reasoning behind leaving out more experienced players.

=== Return and later career ===
Montoya with Colombia in May 2019

Montoya returned to the squad for the 2018 Copa América Femenina, scoring against Uruguay, and in 2019 was part of the team that won gold in the women's tournament at the 2019 Pan American Games in Lima.

Named in the squad for the 2022 Copa América Femenina on 3 July 2022, she scored twice against Paraguay as the hosts reached the final, and was named in the team of the tournament. She captained Colombia at the 2023 FIFA Women's World Cup, for which she was called up on 4 July 2023, and where the team reached the quarter-finals for the first time.

She played at the 2024 CONCACAF W Gold Cup and was named on 5 July 2024 in the squad for the 2024 Summer Olympics in Paris.

By 2025, at 35, Montoya was being used largely from the bench by coach Ángelo Marsiglia, described by El Tiempo as a substitute brought on to organise the midfield. She scored twice against Bolivia at the 2025 Copa América Femenina, where Colombia again finished as runners-up, and in October came off the bench to score in successive CONMEBOL Women's Nations League matches — against Peru on the 24th and Ecuador on the 28th, the latter a long-range strike that settled a 2–1 win. She said afterwards that she had not known how to celebrate. Colombia won the competition on 10 June 2026, beating Paraguay 4–3 in Asunción to take the inaugural title and qualify for the 2027 FIFA Women's World Cup.

== International goals ==
Scores and results list Colombia's goal tally first.

| No. | Date | Venue | Opponent | Score | Result | Competition |
|---|---|---|---|---|---|---|
| 1. | 25 November 2014 | Estadio Unidad Deportiva Hugo Sánchez, Boca del Río, Mexico | Venezuela | 1–0 | 1–0 | 2014 Central American and Caribbean Games |
| 2. | 9 June 2015 | Moncton Stadium, Moncton, Canada | Mexico | 1–1 | 1–1 | 2015 FIFA Women's World Cup |
| 3. | 4 April 2018 | Estadio La Portada, La Serena, Chile | Uruguay | 2–0 | 7–0 | 2018 Copa América Femenina |
| 4. | 8 July 2022 | Estadio Olímpico Pascual Guerrero, Cali, Colombia | Paraguay | 1–0 | 4–2 | 2022 Copa América Femenina |
| 5. | 8 July 2022 | Estadio Olímpico Pascual Guerrero, Cali, Colombia | Paraguay | 3–1 | 4–2 | 2022 Copa América Femenina |
| 6. | 5 December 2023 | Estadio Metropolitano de Techo, Bogotá, Colombia | New Zealand | 1–0 | 1–0 | Friendly |
| 7. | 13 July 2024 | Estadio Jaime Morón León, Cartagena, Colombia | Ecuador | 1–2 | 1–2 | Friendly |
| 8. | 22 July 2025 | Estadio Gonzalo Pozo Ripalda, Quito, Ecuador | Bolivia | 1–0 | 8–0 | 2025 Copa América Femenina |
| 9. | 22 July 2025 | Estadio Gonzalo Pozo Ripalda, Quito, Ecuador | Bolivia | 3–0 | 8–0 | 2025 Copa América Femenina |
| 10. | 24 October 2025 | Estadio Atanasio Girardot, Medellín, Colombia | Peru | 2–1 | 4–1 | 2025–26 CONMEBOL Women's Nations League |
| 11. | 28 October 2025 | Estadio Rodrigo Paz Delgado, Quito, Ecuador | Ecuador | 2–1 | 2–1 | 2025–26 CONMEBOL Women's Nations League |

== Honours ==
Formas Íntimas

- Copa Pre-Libertadores: 2012, 2013, 2014, 2015
- Copa Libertadores Femenina runner-up: 2013

Burela (futsal)

- Copa de la Xunta de Galicia
- Spanish league runner-up: 2013–14

Grêmio

- Campeonato Gaúcho: 2025

Colombia

- CONMEBOL Women's Nations League: 2025–26
- Pan American Games gold medal: 2019
- Pan American Games silver medal: 2015
- Copa América Femenina runner-up: 2010, 2014, 2022, 2025
- Central American and Caribbean Games silver medal: 2014

Individual

- Copa América Femenina team of the tournament: 2022

== See also ==
- List of women's footballers with 100 or more international caps
