= Gisela Robledo =

Colombian footballer (born 2003)

Personal information
- Full name: Gisela Robledo Gil
- Date of birth: 13 May 2003 (age 23)
- Place of birth: Guacarí, Colombia
- Height: 1.65 m (5 ft 5 in)
- Positions: Forward; midfielder

Team information
- Current team: Corinthians

Youth career
- –2018: CD Atlas

Senior career*
Years	Team	Apps	(Gls)
2019–2021	América de Cali	10	(2)
2021	→ Santa Fe (loan)		
2021–2023	Granadilla	12	(1)
2024	América de Cali	0	(0)
2024–	Corinthians		

International career^{‡}
2018–2020	Colombia U17	4	(2)
2020–2023	Colombia U20	11	(12)
2019–	Colombia		(2)
Medal record
Women's football
Representing Colombia
CONMEBOL Women's Nations League
Winner	2025–26
Copa América Femenina
Runner-up	2022 Colombia
- * Club domestic league appearances and goals as of 23 August 2024 ‡ National team caps and goals as of 9 June 2026

Gisela Robledo Gil (born 13 May 2003) is a Colombian professional footballer who plays as a forward for Corinthians and the Colombia women's national team.

Robledo came through the CD Atlas academy in Cali and joined América de Cali in 2019, winning the league title and finishing third in the 2019 Copa Libertadores Femenina in her first season, and reaching the final of the following edition. After a spell with Santa Fe she moved to Spain in 2021 to play for Granadilla Tenerife, and in 2024 she signed for Corinthians, with whom she won the 2024 and 2025 Copa Libertadores Femenina and the 2025 Campeonato Brasileiro.

Robledo scored both of Colombia's goals at the 2018 FIFA U-17 Women's World Cup and was the team's leading scorer at the 2022 South American Under-20 Championship, which took Colombia to the 2022 FIFA U-20 Women's World Cup, where they reached the quarter-finals. She made her senior debut in 2019, was part of the squad that finished as runners-up at the 2022 Copa América Femenina, and in 2026 scored in two CONMEBOL Women's Nations League matches, including the goal against Uruguay that secured Colombia's qualification for the 2027 FIFA Women's World Cup.

== Early life ==
Robledo grew up in Guacarí, a town in the Valle del Cauca about 50 kilometres from Cali. She began kicking a ball in the street and on the town's rough pitches at around the age of four, often playing alongside her older brother, and at five he took her to a futsal court. Her mother initially disapproved, telling her that football was a men's sport and that she should choose another.

At around eleven or twelve, having played only indoor football until then, she stepped in for a missing player in a game her brother's friends were playing on a full-size pitch, and her ability won over the boys who had laughed when she offered to play. Her aunt paid the bus fares to a club an hour from her home and bought her football boots, which allowed her to continue.

== Youth career ==
Robledo trained at the Atlas club in Cali, making the journey of more than an hour each way by bus from Guacarí while still at school; after she began travelling to national youth tournaments with Atlas, her mother came to support her football career. She was selected several times for Valle's under-17 team and for Colombia's youth sides. In 2018, at a CONMEBOL development tournament in Paraguay, she scored ten goals, finishing second in the scoring charts as Atlas won the under-16 competition.

== Club career ==
=== América de Cali (2019–2021) ===
Robledo signed for América de Cali in 2019 and formed an attacking partnership with Linda Caicedo, another young Valle player, which El Espectador described as the best strike duo of the season. América won the league title that year, beating Independiente Medellín in the final. In the group stage of the 2019 Copa Libertadores Femenina in Ecuador, she scored a hat-trick in a 6–1 win over Ecuadorian club Ñañas, when she was 16. She scored again in a 3–2 quarter-final win over UAI Urquiza, but Corinthians beat América 4–0 in the semi-final. In the third-place match, she scored twice in the first half of a 3–1 win over Cerro Porteño, which earned América the bronze medal.

América finished as runners-up in the 2020 Colombian league. The 2020 Copa Libertadores Femenina was played in Argentina in March 2021 because of the COVID-19 pandemic, and Robledo led the América attack as the team beat Corinthians on penalties in the semi-final and reached the final.

=== Santa Fe and Granadilla Tenerife (2021–2023) ===
In 2021 Robledo played for Santa Fe. In December of that year she signed for Spanish club Granadilla Tenerife, who presented her as a young Colombian talent. She was registered with the club when she was called up for the 2022 Copa América and the U-20 World Cup, and left Spain in 2023.

=== Corinthians (2024–present) ===
Robledo returned to América de Cali in 2024 and on 23 August of that year signed for Brazilian club Corinthians, joining in time for the Copa Libertadores Femenina and the state championship. The registration deadline kept her out of the knockout rounds of the 2024 Campeonato Brasileiro, and she featured only in the Libertadores and the state championship in her first season. Corinthians won the 2024 Copa Libertadores Femenina in Paraguay, beating Santa Fe in the final.

Under coach Lucas Piccinato she established herself in the squad, at times playing as a right wing-back, and she was among the starters as Corinthians won a sixth continental title at the 2025 Copa Libertadores Femenina; the final in Banfield against Deportivo Cali finished 0–0 and Corinthians won 5–3 on penalties. Corinthians also won the 2025 Campeonato Brasileiro, and on returning to Guacarí after the Libertadores she was received by residents of her home town. In August 2026 the club announced that she had extended her contract until 31 August 2027, having made 58 appearances for the team since arriving.

== International career ==
=== Youth ===
Robledo joined Colombia's youth teams at 14 and was part of the under-17 side that finished as runners-up at the 2018 South American Under-17 Women's Championship. At the 2018 FIFA U-17 Women's World Cup in Uruguay, Colombia went out in the group stage, but she scored both of the team's goals, one of them against eventual champions Spain, and was named player of the match in that game.

In the qualifying tournament for the 2020 FIFA U-20 Women's World Cup she scored five goals and led Colombia to the final phase in Argentina; the final phase was postponed because of the COVID-19 pandemic and the World Cup itself was cancelled. She returned for the 2022 South American Under-20 Championship in Chile, where she scored seven goals in the tournament, half of them among Colombia's first ten, and was highlighted by CONMEBOL as one of its top scorers. In the decisive last match on 24 April she scored a penalty and added a second goal in a 3–0 win over Uruguay that qualified Colombia for the World Cup.

At the 2022 FIFA U-20 Women's World Cup in Costa Rica, Colombia beat Germany 1–0 in their opening match and reached the quarter-finals, where a penalty gave Brazil a 1–0 win on 20 August. Robledo was one of the team's most prominent players, and set up two goals for Caicedo during the tournament.

=== Senior ===
Robledo made her senior debut on 9 November 2019, in a friendly against Argentina. She was named in the squad for the 2022 Copa América Femenina, hosted by Colombia, and played in four matches, all as a substitute, as Colombia reached the final and secured places at the 2023 World Cup and the 2024 Olympics.

Robledo scored her first two senior goals in the 2025–26 CONMEBOL Women's Nations League. On 10 April 2026 she scored late in the second half to give Colombia a 2–1 win over Venezuela at the Estadio Olímpico Pascual Guerrero, controlling the ball with her chest in the area and finishing across the goalkeeper. On 5 June she scored after 13 minutes in a 1–0 win over Uruguay in Cali that made Colombia the first CONMEBOL team to qualify for the 2027 World Cup. Four days later, in Colombia's 4–3 win in Asunción that made the team the first champions of the competition, a Robledo goal was disallowed in the first half.

=== International goals ===
Scores and results list Colombia's goal tally first

No.	Date	Venue	Opponent	Score	Result	Competition
1.	10 April 2026	Estadio Olímpico Pascual Guerrero, Cali, Colombia	Venezuela	2–1	2–1	2025–26 CONMEBOL Women's Nations League
2.	5 June 2026	Estadio Olímpico Pascual Guerrero, Cali, Colombia	Uruguay	1–0	1–0	2025–26 CONMEBOL Women's Nations League

== Style of play ==
Robledo is a quick, technical attacker whose close control lets her carry the ball with it tight to her feet and take on larger opponents, and she has a powerful shot. FIFA described her as a skilful attacking midfielder in 2020, and she has since been used mainly as a forward, on the wing and, under Corinthians coach Lucas Piccinato, occasionally as a right wing-back.

== Outside football ==
In early 2020 Robledo appeared in an international sports advertisement with Lionel Messi, Serena Williams and Usain Bolt, which was filmed over a week in Slovenia.

== Honours ==
América de Cali

- Colombian Women's Football League: 2019
- Copa Libertadores Femenina third place: 2019

Corinthians

- Copa Libertadores Femenina: 2024, 2025
- Campeonato Brasileiro de Futebol Feminino: 2025

Colombia U17

- South American Under-17 Women's Championship runner-up: 2018

Colombia

- Copa América Femenina runner-up: 2022
- CONMEBOL Women's Nations League: 2025–26
