= Verónica Herrera =

Venezuelan footballer (born 2000)

Verónica Valentina Herrera Souto (born 14 January 2000) is a Venezuelan professional footballer who plays as a centre-back for Spanish Liga F club UDG Tenerife and the Venezuela women's national team.

== Career ==
Herrera played college soccer in the United States. After that, she played in Spain.

=== International goals ===
Scores and results list Venezuela's goal tally first

No.	Date	Venue	Opponent	Score	Result	Competition
1.	10 April 2026	Estadio Olimpico Pascual Guerrero, Cali, Colombia	Colombia	1–0	1–2	2025–26 CONMEBOL Women's Nations League
