= Colombia women's national football team =

Women's national association football team representing Colombia

Colombia
- Nickname(s): Las Chicas Superpoderosas (The Powerpuff Girls); Las Cafeteras (The Coffee Growers)
- Association: Federación Colombiana de Fútbol (FCF)
- Confederation: CONMEBOL (South America)
- Head coach: Ángelo Marsiglia
- Captain: Daniela Montoya
- Most caps: Catalina Usme (126)
- Top scorer: Catalina Usme (62)
- Home stadium: Estadio Olímpico Pascual Guerrero
- FIFA code: COL
First colours	Second colours

FIFA ranking
- Current: 20 (16 June 2026)
- Highest: 18 (June – August 2025)
- Lowest: 43 (March 2007)

First international
- Colombia 4–1 Venezuela (Mar del Plata, Argentina; 2 March 1998)

Biggest win
- Colombia 8–0 Venezuela (Lima, Peru; 11 April 2003); Uruguay 0–8 Colombia (Barranquilla, Colombia; 6 June 2004); Uruguay 0–8 Colombia (Cuenca, Ecuador; 13 November 2010); Colombia 8–0 Bolivia (Quito, Ecuador; 22 July 2025)

Biggest defeat
- Brazil 12–0 Colombia (Lima, Peru; 27 April 2003)

World Cup
- Appearances: 3 (first in 2011)
- Best result: Quarter-finals (2023)

Copa América
- Appearances: 8 (first in 1998)
- Best result: Runners-up (2010, 2014, 2022, 2025)

Olympic Games
- Appearances: 4 (first in 2012)
- Best result: Quarter-finals (2024)

CONMEBOL Nations League
- Appearances: 1 (first in 2025–26)
- Best result: Champions (2026)
Medal record
Copa América
Silver medal – second place	2010 Ecuador	Team
Silver medal – second place	2014 Ecuador	Team
Silver medal – second place	2022 Colombia	Team
Silver medal – second place	2025 Ecuador	Team
Bronze medal – third place	2003 Peru, Argentina & Ecuador	Team
CONMEBOL Nations League
Gold medal – first place	2025–26	Team
Pan American Games
Gold medal – first place	2019 Lima	Team
Silver medal – second place	2015 Toronto	Team
Central American and Caribbean Games
Silver medal – second place	2014 Veracruz	Team
Silver medal – second place	2026 Santo Domingo	Team
Bolivarian Games
Gold medal – first place	2009 Sucre	Team
Silver medal – second place	2005 Armenia-Pereira	Team

The Colombia women's national football team (Spanish: Selección femenina de fútbol de Colombia) represents Colombia in international women's football competitions and is controlled by the Colombian Football Federation. They are a member of the CONMEBOL. The team is currently ranked 20th in the FIFA Ranking and has qualified for four FIFA Women's World Cups, in Germany 2011, Canada 2015, Australia–New Zealand 2023 and Brazil 2027.

Colombia is one of South America's best-ranked national teams, and are also the third nation of the continent to qualify for World Cup and the Olympics, besides Brazil and Argentina. Colombia was the first Spanish-speaking country to win a game in the Women's World Cup and whose women's team advanced beyond the group stage in a World Cup (in 2015). In 2023, Colombia first reached the Women's World Cup quarterfinals.

Las Cafeteras have participated in all Copa América Femenina editions since 1998, finishing as runners-up in 2010, 2014, 2022 and 2025. They are the reigning champions of the CONMEBOL Women's Nations League, having won the inaugural 2025–26 edition. The team also won gold at the 2019 Pan American Games in Lima and silver at Toronto 2015. At the Bolivarian Games, they won gold at Sucre 2009 and silver at Colombia 2005.

== History ==
=== Origins and early international appearances ===
Women's football was played in Colombia from the 1940s onwards, largely through informal and regional competitions that operated without federation backing, and the sport gained institutional recognition only decades later. A national team did not appear in official competition until the 1998 South American Women's Football Championship in Mar del Plata. Colombia beat Venezuela 4–1 in their first match and won two of four group games, but a 12–1 defeat by Brazil indicated the distance still separating them from the continent's established side.

That pattern of heavy wins against weaker opponents and heavy losses to Brazil persisted. At the 2003 South American Women's Football Championship in Lima, under Myriam Guerrero, Colombia beat Venezuela 8–0 and finished third, yet also lost 12–0 to Brazil in the same tournament. Guerrero later attributed the team's limitations to the absence of a domestic professional league. The federation's commitment remained uneven: for the 2005 Bolivarian Games it entered an under-19 side even though senior teams were eligible, and that team still finished second behind hosts Peru.

=== Breakthrough and first global tournaments (2010–2012) ===
The decisive change came in 2010. Under Ricardo Rozo, Colombia finished runners-up at the 2010 South American Women's Football Championship in Ecuador, beating Uruguay 8–0, Venezuela 5–0 and Argentina 1–0 in the final group. A single tournament thereby delivered three debuts: the 2011 FIFA Women's World Cup, the 2011 Pan American Games and the 2012 Olympic tournament.

Those first appearances exposed how little the results in South America translated. Drawn against Sweden, the United States and North Korea in Germany, Colombia lost 1–0 and 3–0 before drawing 0–0 with North Korea, finishing 14th without scoring. They came fourth at the Pan American Games in Guadalajara and then lost all three group matches in London. The opening game at Hampden Park was delayed after organisers displayed the South Korean flag beside the North Korean line-up, prompting the North Korean team to leave the pitch for around an hour.

=== Canada 2015 and the dispute with the federation (2014–2016) ===
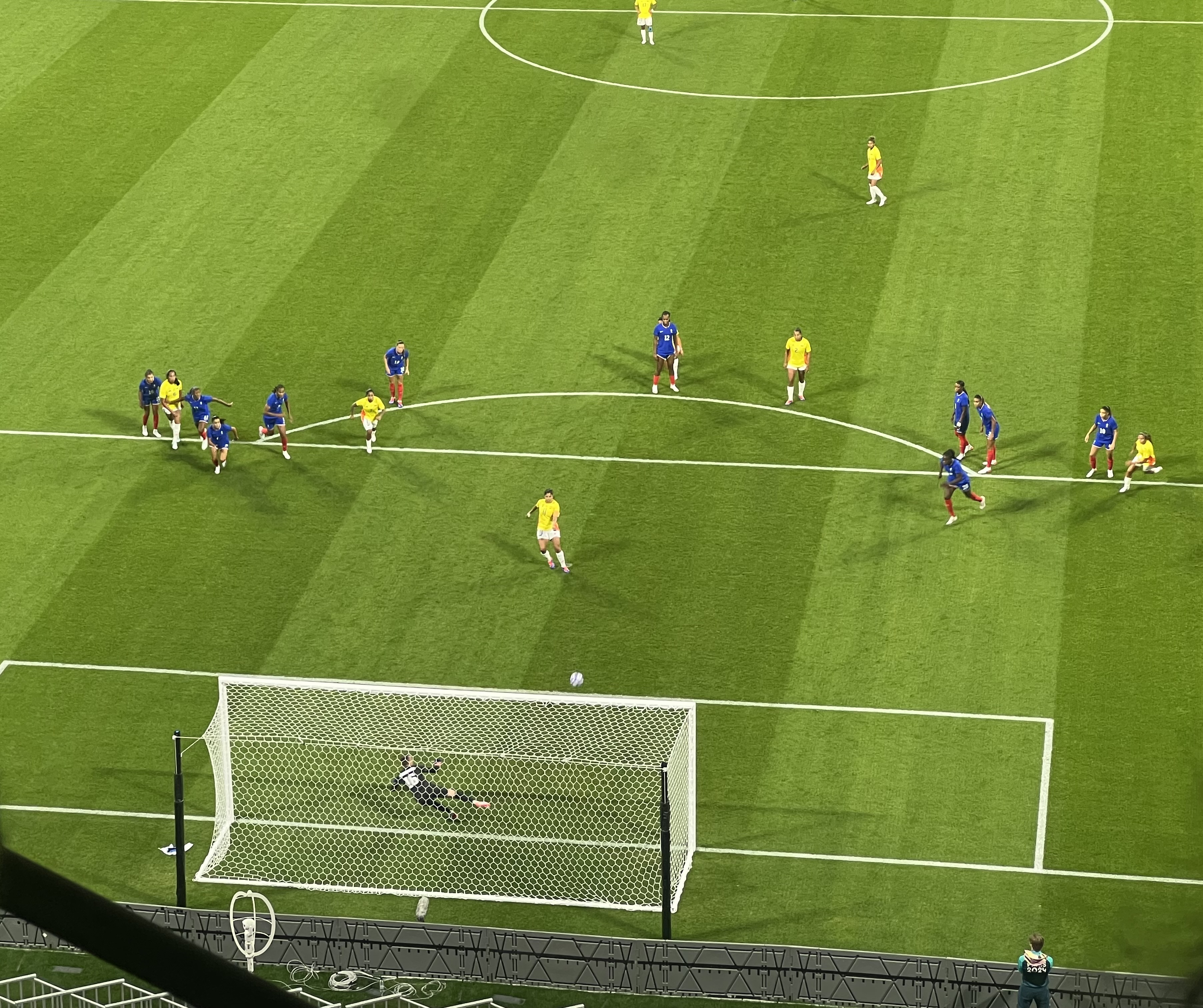
Catalina Usme scores a penalty against France at the 2024 Summer Olympics

Fabián Felipe Taborda took charge for the 2014 Copa América Femenina, where Colombia conceded twice in seven matches and again finished behind Brazil, qualifying for both the 2015 FIFA Women's World Cup and the 2016 Olympic tournament. In Canada they drew 1–1 with Mexico and then beat France 2–0 in Moncton—their first Women's World Cup win, and the first by a Spanish-speaking nation at the tournament. A 2–1 loss to England still left them in the round of 16, where the eventual champions the United States eliminated them 2–0.

At the 2015 Pan American Games in Toronto, Colombia reached the women's football final after defeating Canada 1–0 in the semi-final at the Hamilton Pan Am Soccer Stadium. They ultimately finished with the silver medal after losing 4–0 to Brazil in the final. The result added another major tournament final to Colombia's growing record during the period, although Brazil remained the dominant side in the region.

Progress on the pitch coincided with open conflict off it. After players criticised disparities in bonuses and conditions compared with the men's team, several members of the 2015 squad—among them the goalkeeper Sandra Sepúlveda and the forwards Daniela Montoya and Lady Andrade—were left out of the pre-Olympic training camp. Colombia went out in the group stage at Rio 2016, though they drew a match and scored their first Olympic goals.

=== Titles and the 2023 quarter-final (2019–present) ===
Colombia won their first senior title at the 2019 Pan American Games, beating Argentina on penalties in the final in Lima. They reached the semi-finals of the 2018 Copa América Femenina and, as hosts of the 2022 edition, lost a third final to Brazil before large crowds in Cali.

The 2023 FIFA Women's World Cup produced their best global result. Colombia won Group H ahead of Germany, South Korea and Morocco, beating the two-time champions 2–1 in Sydney through a Linda Caicedo goal and a 97th-minute winner, then beat Jamaica 1–0 in the round of 16. England beat them 2–1 in the quarter-finals, leaving Colombia eighth.

Under Ángelo Marsiglia the team reached the quarter-finals of the 2024 Olympic tournament and entered the top 20 of the FIFA Women's World Rankings for the first time in June 2025, at 18th. A fourth Copa América final defeat by Brazil followed in Ecuador in 2025. The long wait for a senior continental title ended in June 2026, when Colombia won the inaugural 2025–26 CONMEBOL Women's Nations League, finishing unbeaten on 20 points from eight matches after a 4–3 win over Paraguay in Asunción on the final matchday, which also confirmed direct qualification for the 2027 FIFA Women's World Cup.

== Team image ==
Colombia's identity as a women's side has been shaped less by symbols inherited from the men's team than by the emergence of Cali as its adopted home, where crowds have repeatedly set national records for the sport.

=== Nicknames and colours ===
The team carries two nicknames. Las Cafeteras ("The Coffee Growers"), the feminine form of the men's Los Cafeteros, refers to Colombia's coffee production, while Las Chicas Superpoderosas ("The Powerpuff Girls") alludes to the American animated series and is specific to the women's side. CONMEBOL and the Colombian press also use las cafeteras in match coverage.

Colombia wear yellow at home, with blue and red trim drawn from the national flag, and the kits supplied by Adidas are shared across the federation's men's, women's and youth teams. An exception came in March 2023, when Adidas released an away shirt inspired by the Caño Cristales river for the women's team alone—reported as the first kit designed exclusively for a Colombian women's national side, which had previously worn the men's designs.

=== Home venues and support ===
Supporters during Colombia's match against Chile at the 2022 Copa América Femenina

Colombia have no permanent home ground, but the Estadio Olímpico Pascual Guerrero in Cali has become their principal venue; the city government declared itself the team's home in 2022 after a run of large attendances, and the coach Nelson Abadía credited municipal backing for the shift.

The 2022 Copa América Femenina, which Colombia hosted, demonstrated that support. The team played its group matches at Pascual Guerrero before crowds rising from 15,000 against Paraguay to 25,000 against Ecuador, and a friendly against Costa Rica in Cali that September drew about 34,000. The tournament also used the Estadio Centenario in Armenia and the Estadio Américo Montanini in Bucaramanga, where Brazil beat Colombia 1–0 in the final. Two years later the same stadium recorded the largest crowd for any women's football match in Colombia, 37,382, for the national under-20 team's quarter-final against the Netherlands at the 2024 FIFA U-20 Women's World Cup.

== Results and fixtures ==
The following is a list of match results in the last 12 months, as well as any future matches that have been scheduled.

Legend

Win Draw Loss Fixture Void or Postponed

=== 2025 ===
24 October Liga de Naciones	Colombia	4–1	Peru	Medellín, Colombia
20:00 UTC−5	Santos 6' (pen.), 89'; Montoya 74'; Chacón 90+6'	Report (FIFA); Report (CONMEBOL)	Núñez 48'	Stadium: Estadio Atanasio Girardot; Referee: Laura Fortunato (Argentina)

28 October Liga de Naciones	Ecuador	1–2	Colombia	Quito, Ecuador
18:00 UTC−5	Bolaños 52' (pen.)	Report (FIFA)	Santos 45' (pen.); Montoya 71'	Stadium: Estadio Rodrigo Paz Delgado; Referee: Zulma Quiñónez (Paraguay)

28 November Liga de Naciones	Bolivia	1–1	Colombia	El Alto, Bolivia
17:00 UTC−4	Turihuano 46'	Report (FIFA); Report (CONMEBOL)	Rodríguez 76'	Stadium: Estadio Municipal de El Alto; Referee: Stefani Escobar (Venezuela)

=== 2026 ===
March 1 SheBelieves Cup	Canada	4–1	Colombia	Nashville, United States
14:00 ET	Gilles 31'; Sonis 67'; Collins 73'; Prince 90'	Report	Santos 81' (pen.); Robledo (yellow card) 64' (yellow-red card) 83'	Stadium: Geodis Park; Attendance: 17,125; Referee: Katja Koroleva (United States)

4 March SheBelieves Cup	Argentina	0–1	Colombia	Columbus, United States
		Report	Caicedo 64'	Stadium: ScottsMiracle-Gro Field; Attendance: 18,545; Referee: Natalie Simon (United States)

7 March SheBelieves Cup	United States	1–0	Colombia	Harrison, United States
	A. Thompson 82'	Report		Stadium: Sports Illustrated Stadium; Attendance: 22,385; Referee: Vimarest Diaz (Dominican Republic)

10 April Liga de Naciones	Colombia	2–1	Venezuela	Cali, Colombia
	Santos 22' (pen.); Robledo 80'		V. Herrera 10'	Stadium: Estadio Olímpico Pascual Guerrero

14 April Liga de Naciones	Colombia	2–0	Chile	Cali, Colombia
20:00 UTC−5	Caicedo 14'; Vanegas 90+6' (pen.)	Report (FIFA); Report (CONMEBOL)		Stadium: Estadio Olimpico Pascual Guerrero; Referee: Marcelly Zambrano (Ecuador)

18 April Liga de Naciones	Argentina	0–0	Colombia	Lanús, Argentina
20:00 UTC−3		Report (FIFA); Report (CONMEBOL)		Stadium: Estadio Ciudad de Lanús; Referee: Emikar Calderas (Venezuela)

5 June Liga de Naciones	Colombia	1–0	Uruguay	Cali, Colombia
18:00 UTC−5	Robledo 14'	Report		Stadium: Estadio Olímpico Pascual Guerrero; Referee: Verónica Guazhambo (Ecuador)

9 June Liga de Naciones	Paraguay	3–4	Colombia	Asunción, Paraguay
20:00 UTC−3	Quintana 3' (pen.); C. Martínez 9'; Chamorro 45+1'	Report	Guzmán 7', 89'; Restrepo 43'; Caicedo 60'	Stadium: Estadio Defensores del Chaco; Referee: Daiane Muniz (Brazil)

29 July CACG GS	Jamaica	0–5	Colombia	La Vega, Dominican Republic
14:00		Report	Ibargüen 7', 34'; Garavito 35'; González 76'; Baldovino 89'	Stadium: Estadio Olímpico; Referee: Arron Stamper (Aruba)

31 July CACG GS	Colombia	0–1	Mexico	Moca, Dominican Republic
19:00		Report	P. García 28'	Stadium: Estadio Moca 85; Referee: Minely Ureña (Dominican Republic)

2 August CACG GS	Puerto Rico	0–3	Colombia	Santiago de los Caballeros, Dominican Republic
14:00		Report	Guerra 25'; Viáfara 32'; Carvajal 75'	Stadium: Estadio Cibao FC; Referee: Kattia Flores (El Salvador)

4 August CACG SF	Venezuela	2–2 (a.e.t.) (3–4 p)	Colombia	Moca, Dominican Republic
15:00	Flórez 4'; Herrera 24'	Report	Aponzá 40'; Zamorano 53'	Stadium: Estadio Moca 85; Referee: Kenisha Prescott (Guyana)
	Penalties
	Sandoval (penalty scored); Flórez (penalty scored); Muñoz (penalty missed); O. Durán (penalty scored); Chirinos (penalty missed)		(penalty scored) González; (penalty scored) Viáfara; (penalty scored) Martínez; (penalty scored) Vásquez; (penalty missed) Perlaza

6 August CACG F	Colombia	1–1 (a.e.t.) (2–4 p)	Mexico	Santiago de los Caballeros, Dominican Republic
20:00	Guerra 118'	Report	Mendoza 120+4'	Stadium: Estadio Cibao FC; Referee: Marjorie Ponce (Nicaragua)
	Penalties
	Carvajal (penalty scored); Guerra (penalty missed); Ibargüen (penalty missed); Viáfara (penalty scored)		(penalty scored) Pérez; (penalty scored) Colin; (penalty scored) Vargas; (penalty scored) Veloz

10 October Friendly	Venezuela	0–1	Colombia	Maneiro, Venezuela
17:00 UTC−4		Report	Guerra 66'	Stadium: Centro Nacional de Alto Rendimiento

13 October Friendly	Venezuela	1–2	Colombia	Maneiro, Venezuela
17:00 UTC−4	Higuera 87'	Report	Vanegas 18' (pen.); Rodríguez 45+4'	Stadium: Centro Nacional de Alto Rendimiento

28 November Friendly	Australia	v	Colombia	Canberra, Australia
19:35 UTC+11		Source		Stadium: GIO Stadium

2 December Friendly	Australia	v	Colombia	Geelong, Australia
19:35 UTC+11		Source		Stadium: GMHBA Stadium

== Head-to-head record ==
Below is a result summary of all matches Colombia have played against FIFA recognized teams.

As of 3 November 2026

Positive Record Neutral Record Negative Record

Opponents	Pld	W	D	L	GF	GA	GD	Win %
Argentina	17	4	9	4	14	19	-5	24%
Australia	1	1	0	0	2	1	1	100%
Bolivia	5	4	1	0	19	4	15	80%
Brazil	15	0	4	11	10	52	-42	0%
Canada	5	1	0	4	3	8	-5	20%
Chile	15	8	6	1	25	9	16	53%
China	1	0	0	1	0	2	-2	0%
Costa Rica	6	4	1	1	10	6	4	67%
Denmark	2	0	2	0	3	3	0	0%
Ecuador	14	11	2	1	29	10	19	79%
England	2	0	0	2	2	4	-2	0%
France	5	1	0	4	6	13	-7	20%
Germany	1	1	0	0	2	1	1	100%
Guatemala	1	1	0	0	3	0	3	100%
Haiti	1	1	0	0	3	0	3	100%
Italy	1	0	0	1	1	2	-1	0%
Jamaica	4	3	0	1	9	2	7	75%
Japan	4	0	1	3	5	15	-10	0%
Mexico	16	2	6	8	12	21	-9	13%
Morocco	1	0	0	1	0	1	-1	0%
New Zealand	6	2	1	3	4	4	0	33%
Nigeria	1	1	0	0	1	0	1	100%
North Korea	2	0	1	1	0	2	-2	0%
Panama	3	2	1	0	9	1	8	67%
Paraguay	8	7	1	0	25	7	18	88%
Peru	10	7	0	3	19	9	10	67%
Puerto Rico	2	2	0	0	5	0	5	100%
South Korea	3	2	1	0	4	1	3	67%
Spain	1	0	1	0	2	2	0	0%
Sweden	1	0	0	1	0	1	-1	0%
Thailand	1	0	1	0	1	1	0	0%
Trinidad and Tobago	3	2	1	0	9	1	8	67%
United States	15	0	2	13	2	44	-42	0%
Uruguay	8	8	0	0	27	2	25	100%
Venezuela	24	19	4	1	55	13	42	79%
Vietnam	1	1	0	0	2	0	2	100%
Wales	1	1	0	0	3	1	2	100%
Zambia	2	2	0	0	2	0	2	100%
Total	209	98	46	65	328	262	66	47%

=== Full Confederation record ===
Team	Pld	W	D	L	GF	GA	GD	WPCT
AFC	14	5	4	5	15	22	−7	35.71
CAF	3	2	0	1	2	1	+1	66.67
CONCACAF	56	18	11	27	65	83	−18	32.14
CONMEBOL	116	68	27	21	223	125	+98	58.62
OFC	6	2	1	3	4	4	0	33.33
UEFA	14	3	3	8	19	27	−8	21.43
Total	209	98	46	65	328	262	+66	46.89

Source: Results

== Players ==
=== Current squad ===
The following 23 players were called up for the 2025–26 CONMEBOL Liga de Naciones matches against Uruguay and Paraguay on 5 and 9 June 2026.

No.	Pos.	Player	Date of birth (age)	Club
	GK	Catalina Pérez	8 November 1994 (aged 31)	(French Football Federation) Strasbourg
	GK	Katherine Tapia	7 December 1992 (aged 33)	(Brazilian Football Confederation) Palmeiras
	GK	Luisa Agudelo	27 March 2007 (aged 19)	(United States Soccer Federation) San Diego Wave
	DF	Ana María Guzmán	11 June 2005 (aged 20)	(Brazilian Football Confederation) Palmeiras
	DF	Ángela Barón	18 September 2003 (aged 22)	(French Football Federation) Le Havre
	DF	Daniela Arias	31 August 1994 (aged 31)	(Mexican Football Federation) León
	DF	Daniela Caracas	25 April 1997 (aged 29)	(Royal Spanish Football Federation) Deportivo de A Coruña
	DF	Jorelyn Carabalí	18 May 1997 (aged 29)	(United States Soccer Federation) Boston Legacy FC
	DF	Manuela Vanegas	30 November 2000 (aged 25)	(The Football Association) Brighton & Hove Albion
	DF	Yirleidis Minota	10 November 2002 (aged 23)	(Mexican Football Federation) Pachuca
	MF	Daniela Montoya	22 August 1990 (aged 35)	(Peruvian Football Federation) Alianza Lima
	MF	Gabriela Rodríguez	10 May 2005 (aged 21)	(Brazilian Football Confederation) Cruzeiro
	MF	Ilana Izquierdo	14 June 2002 (aged 23)	(Mexican Football Federation) Tigres UANL
	MF	Leicy Santos	16 May 1996 (aged 30)	(United States Soccer Federation) Washington Spirit
	MF	Lorena Bedoya	6 October 1997 (aged 28)	(Brazilian Football Confederation) Cruzeiro
	MF	Marcela Restrepo	10 November 1995 (aged 30)	(Mexican Football Federation) Monterrey
	FW	Gisela Robledo	13 May 2003 (aged 23)	(Brazilian Football Confederation) Corinthians
	FW	Greicy Landázury	1 August 2004 (aged 21)	(Brazilian Football Confederation) Palmeiras
	FW	Linda Caicedo	22 February 2005 (aged 21)	(Royal Spanish Football Federation) Real Madrid
	FW	Maithé López	24 January 2007 (aged 19)	(Canadian Soccer Association) Vancouver Rise
	FW	Mayra Ramírez	25 March 1999 (aged 27)	(The Football Association) Chelsea
	FW	Michelle Vásquez	16 December 2004 (aged 21)	(Colombian Football Federation) Deportivo Cali
	FW	Wendy Bonilla	8 July 2002 (aged 23)	(Brazilian Football Confederation) Santos

=== Recent call-ups ===
The following players have been called up for the squad within the past 12 months.

Pos.	Player	Date of birth (age)	Caps	Goals	Club	Latest call-up
GK	Natalia Giraldo	19 May 2003 (age 23)	–	–	(Colombia) América de Cali	2026 Central American and Caribbean Games
DF	Liz Katerine Osorio	20 November 2004 (age 21)	–	–	(Colombia) Deportivo Cali	2026 Central American and Caribbean Games
DF	Carolina Arias	2 September 1990 (age 36)	–	–	(Colombia) América de Cali	v. Bolivia, 28 November 2025
DF	Mary Álvarez	22 August 2005 (age 21)	–	–	(Colombia) Atlético Nacional	v. Bolivia, 28 November 2025
MF	Sara Martínez	22 January 2001 (age 25)	–	–	(Colombia) Atlético Nacional	2026 Central American and Caribbean Games
MF	Juana Ortegón	6 August 2006 (age 20)	–	–	(Colombia) Santa Fe	2026 Central American and Caribbean Games
FW	Valerin Loboa	3 July 2007 (age 19)	–	–	(United States) Portland Thorns	v. Bolivia, 28 November 2025
FW	Ivonne Chacón	12 October 1997 (age 29)	–	–	(Italy) Fiorentina	v. Bolivia, 28 November 2025

== Competitive record ==
*Draws include knockout matches decided on penalty kicks.
**Red border colour indicates tournament was held on home soil.

Champions Runners-up Third place Fourth place

=== FIFA Women's World Cup ===
FIFA Women's World Cup record
Year	Result	Position	Pld	W	D*	L	GF	GA	Squad
(China) 1991	Did not enter								
(Sweden) 1995	Did not enter								
(United States) 1999	Did not qualify								
(United States) 2003	Did not qualify								
(China) 2007	Did not qualify								
(Germany) 2011	Group stage	14th	3	0	1	2	0	4	Squad
(Canada) 2015	Round of 16	12th	4	1	1	2	4	5	Squad
(France) 2019	Did not qualify								
(Australia) (New Zealand) 2023	Quarter-finals	8th	5	3	0	2	6	4	Squad
(Brazil) 2027	Qualified								
(Costa Rica) (Jamaica) (Mexico) (United States) 2031	To be determined								
(United Kingdom) 2035	To be determined								
Total	Quarter-finals	4/10	12	4	2	6	10	13	

FIFA Women's World Cup history
Year	Round	Date	Opponent	Result	Stadium
(Germany) 2011	Group stage	28 June	Sweden	L 0–1	BayArena, Leverkusen
(Germany) 2011	Group stage	2 July	United States	L 0–3	Rhein-Neckar-Arena, Sinsheim
(Germany) 2011	Group stage	6 July	North Korea	D 0–0	Ruhrstadion, Bochum
(Canada) 2015	Group stage	9 June	Mexico	D 1–1	Moncton Stadium, Moncton
(Canada) 2015	Group stage	13 June	France	W 2–0	Moncton Stadium, Moncton
(Canada) 2015	Group stage	17 June	England	L 1–2	Olympic Stadium, Montreal
(Canada) 2015	Round of 16	22 June	United States	L 0–2	Commonwealth Stadium, Edmonton
(Australia) (New Zealand) 2023	Group stage	25 July	South Korea	W 2–0	Sydney Football Stadium, Sydney
(Australia) (New Zealand) 2023	Group stage	30 July	Germany	W 2–1	Sydney Football Stadium, Sydney
(Australia) (New Zealand) 2023	Group stage	3 August	Morocco	L 0–1	Perth Oval, Perth
(Australia) (New Zealand) 2023	Round of 16	8 August	Jamaica	W 1–0	Melbourne Rectangular Stadium, Melbourne
(Australia) (New Zealand) 2023	Quarter-finals	12 August	England	L 1–2	Stadium Australia, Sydney
(Brazil) 2027	Group stage				

=== Olympic Games ===
Olympic Games record
Year	Result	Position	Pld	W	D*	L	GF	GA	Squad
(United States) 1996	Did not enter								
(Australia) 2000	Did not qualify								
(Greece) 2004	Did not qualify								
(China) 2008	Did not qualify								
(United Kingdom) 2012	Group stage	11th	3	0	0	3	0	6	Squad
(Brazil) 2016	Group stage	11th	3	0	1	2	2	7	Squad
(Japan) 2020	Did not qualify								
(France) 2024	Quarter-finals	8th	4	1	1	2	6	6	Squad
(United States) 2028	Qualified								
(Australia) 2032	To be determined								
Total	Quarter-finals	3/8	10	1	2	7	8	19	

=== Copa América Femenina ===
Copa América Femenina record
Year	Result	Position	Pld	W	D*	L	GF	GA
(Brazil) 1991	Did not enter							
(Brazil) 1995	Did not enter							
(Argentina) 1998	Group Stage	6th	4	2	0	2	11	16
(Peru) 2003	Third place	3rd	5	2	1	2	12	16
(Argentina) 2006	Group stage	7th	4	1	1	2	4	11
(Ecuador) 2010	Runners-up	2nd	7	4	1	2	19	8
(Ecuador) 2014	Runners-up	2nd	7	5	2	0	12	2
(Chile) 2018	Fourth place	4th	7	3	2	2	17	8
(Colombia) 2022	Runners-up	2nd	6	5	0	1	14	4
(Ecuador) 2025	Runners-up	2nd	6	2	4	0	16	5
Total	Runners-up	8/10	46	24	11	11	105	70

=== CONMEBOL Women's Nations League ===
CONMEBOL Women's Nations League record
Year	Result	Position	Pld	W	D*	L	GF	GA
2025-26	Champions	1st	8	6	2	0	16	7
Total	1 Title	1/1	8	6	2	0	16	7

=== Pan American Games ===
Pan American Games record
Year	Result	Position	Pld	W	D*	L	GF	GA	Squad
(Canada) 1999	Did not enter								
(Dominican Republic) 2003	Did not enter								
(Brazil) 2007	Did not enter								
(Mexico) 2011	Fourth place	4th	5	2	0	3	3	4	Squad
(Canada) 2015	Runners-up	2nd	5	3	1	1	5	5	Squad
(Peru) 2019	Champions	1st	5	2	3	0	9	6	Squad
(Chile) 2023	Did not qualify								
(Peru) 2027	To be determined								
Total	1 Title	4/8	15	7	4	4	17	15	

=== Central American and Caribbean Games ===
Central American and Caribbean Games record
Year	Result	Pld	W	D*	L	GF	GA
(Puerto Rico) 2010	Did not enter						
(Mexico) 2014	Silver medal	5	3	1	1	12	3
(Colombia) 2018	Group stage	3	1	0	2	4	5
(El Salvador) 2023	Withdrew						
(Dominican Republic) 2026	Silver medal	5	2	2	1	11	4
Total	Silver medal	13	6	3	4	27	12

=== South American Games ===
South American Games record
Year	Result	Pld	W	D*	L	GF	GA
(Chile) 2014	5°	3	1	0	2	3	3
(Bolivia) 2018	2°	5	3	2	0	6	2
(Paraguay) 2022	3°	3	2	0	1	3	3
Total	4°	11	6	2	3	12	8

*Draws include knockout matches decided on penalty kicks.

=== Bolivarian Games ===
Bolivarian Games record
Year	Result	Pld	W	D*	L	GF	GA
(Colombia) 2005	Silver Medal	6	4	0	2	12	7
(Bolivia) 2009	Gold Medal	4	4	0	0	10	3
2013 to present	U20 Team Tournament						
Total	2/2	10	8	0	2	22	10

=== CONCACAF W Gold Cup ===
CONCACAF W Gold Cup record
Year	Result	Pld	W	D*	L	GF	GA	P
(United States) 2024	Quarter-finals	4	2	0	2	8	4	6
Total	1/1	4	2	0	2	8	4	6

*Denotes draws include knockout matches decided via penalty shoot-out.

== Honours ==
=== Major competitions ===
- Copa América Femenina
  - (silver) Runners-up (4): 2010, 2014, 2022, 2025
  - (bronze) Third place (1): 2003
- CONMEBOL Women's Nations League
  - (gold) Champions (1): 2025-26

=== Others competitions ===
Intercontinental

- Pan American Games
  - (gold) Gold Medalists (1): 2019
  - (silver) Silver Medalists (1): 2015

Regional

- Bolivarian Games
  - (gold) Gold Medalists (1): 2009
  - (silver) Silver Medalists (1): 2005
- Central American and Caribbean Games
  - (silver) Silver Medalists (2): 2014, 2026

== See also ==
- Sport in Colombia
  - Football in Colombia
    - Women's football in Colombia
- Colombia women's national under-20 football team
- Colombia women's national under-17 football team
- Colombia women's national futsal team
- Colombia men's national football team
