= Manuela Vanegas =

Colombian footballer (born 2000)

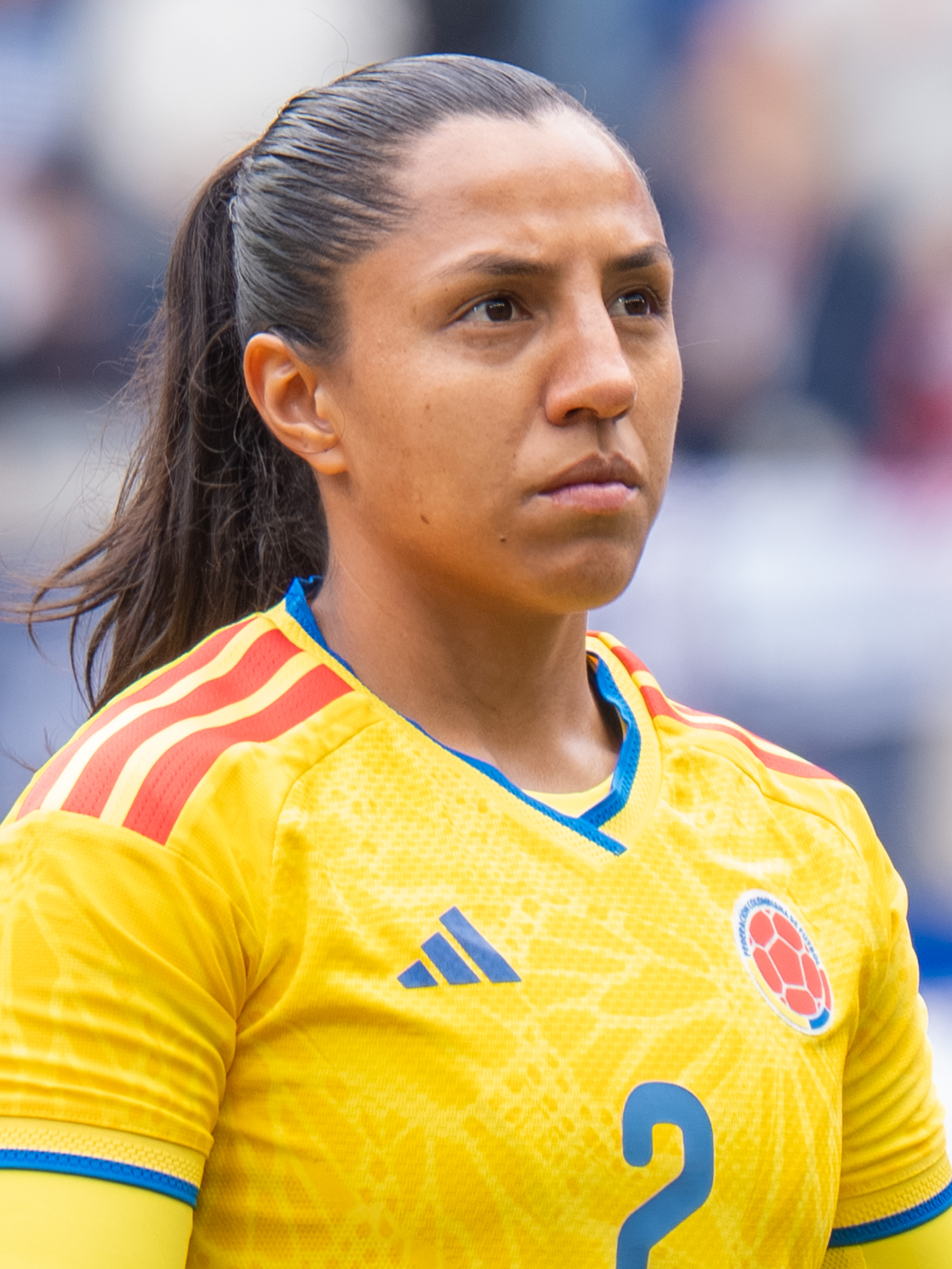
- Vanegas with Colombia in 2026

Personal information
- Full name: Manuela Vanegas Cataño
- Date of birth: 9 November 2000 (age 26)
- Place of birth: Copacabana, Colombia
- Height: 1.70 m (5 ft 7 in)
- Position: Left back

Team information
- Current team: Brighton & Hove Albion
- Number: 2

Senior career*
Years	Team	Apps	(Gls)
2013–2017	Formas Íntimas		
2017–2018	Envigado		
2018	Atlético Huila		
2019	Independiente Medellín		
2020–2021	Espanyol	33	(3)
2021–2025	Real Sociedad	83	(9)
2025–	Brighton & Hove Albion	25	(1)

International career^{‡}
2020	Colombia U20	2	(3)
2018–	Colombia	62	(11)
Medal record
Women's football
Representing Colombia
CONMEBOL Women's Nations League
Gold medal – first place	2025–26
Copa América Femenina
Runner-up	2022 Colombia
Pan American Games
Gold medal – first place	2019 Lima	Team
- * Club domestic league appearances and goals as of 22 November 2026 ‡ National team caps and goals as of 24 October 2026

Manuela Vanegas Cataño (Latin American Spanish: [maˈnwela baˈneɡas kaˈtaɲo]; born 9 November 2000) is a Colombian professional footballer who plays as a defender, chiefly at left back, for Women's Super League club Brighton & Hove Albion and the Colombia national team.

Vanegas played as a goalkeeper in her early years at Formas Íntimas, making her Copa Libertadores Femenina debut at 13, before settling in defence. After spells with Envigado, Atlético Huila and Independiente Medellín, she moved to Spain in 2020 with Espanyol and spent four seasons at Real Sociedad before joining Brighton in 2025.

A Colombia international since 2018, Vanegas won gold at the 2019 Pan American Games, finished as a runner-up at the 2022 Copa América Femenina and scored the stoppage-time winner against Germany at the 2023 FIFA Women's World Cup. A cruciate ligament injury in January 2025 kept her out for most of a year, but she returned to win the inaugural CONMEBOL Women's Nations League in 2026.

== Early life ==
Vanegas was born on 9 November 2000 and grew up in Copacabana, a town in the department of Antioquia, near Medellín. She grew up around the game — her father, Héctor, and her brother Franky both played — and she started at the age of five, later becoming the first member of her family to play professionally. She has described her mother, who grew up in Amalfi some 80 km to the north-east and worked in clothing manufacturing, as her biggest inspiration; her father worked as a labourer, and money was tight for a family with three children. The eldest of her two older brothers was killed in 2005, aged 16, when Vanegas was four; she has said she has few memories of him and carries a tattoo in his memory.

She grew up admiring Cristiano Ronaldo and Marta, and played against the latter at the 2018 Copa América Femenina at the age of 18.

== Club career ==
=== Formas Íntimas ===
Vanegas began playing club football with Formas Íntimas of Medellín, alternating between goalkeeper and outfield positions. She played in the Copa Libertadores Femenina with the club in 2013 and 2014, reaching the final and the semi-finals respectively, and made her debut in the competition at the age of 13, going in goal after Sandra Sepúlveda was sent off.

=== Envigado, Atlético Huila and Independiente Medellín ===
Vanegas joined Envigado in 2017, and in a league match in May 2018 again deputised in goal, saving a penalty after replacing the club's injured goalkeeper. She moved to Atlético Huila later in 2018 and to Independiente Medellín in 2019, helping the latter reach the league final.

=== Espanyol ===
Vanegas moved to Spain in 2020 with Espanyol, where she played 33 league matches and scored three goals in the 2020–21 season, establishing herself as a mainstay of the defence.

=== Real Sociedad ===
On 9 July 2021, Vanegas joined Real Sociedad as the club's second signing of the summer. She became a regular in the Basque side and in May 2023 signed a contract extension running to 2025. Across four seasons she made 96 appearances and scored ten goals in all competitions.

Her final season was cut short on 5 January 2025, when she ruptured the anterior cruciate ligament in her right knee in a match against Barcelona. She had scored three goals in 12 appearances before the injury, which required surgery and ended her campaign.

=== Brighton & Hove Albion ===
In July 2025, Vanegas signed for Brighton & Hove Albion, joining fellow Colombia international Jorelyn Carabalí at the club. Head coach Dario Vidošić described her as "a solid defender who is both reliable at defending and threatening moving forward". Speaking in February 2026, after a first half-season back from her knee injury, Vanegas said she was "happy because last year I was injured, so it feels good playing with the team regularly". On 5 October 2026, Vanegas signed a new long term contract with Brighton & Hove Albion.

== International career ==
Vanegas was called up to the Colombia squad for the 2018 Copa América Femenina, where she made her senior debut. Earlier that year she had scored against Venezuela at the Central American and Caribbean Games, and in 2019 she was part of the Colombia side that won gold in the women's tournament at the 2019 Pan American Games in Lima.

Named in the squad for the 2022 Copa América Femenina on 3 July 2022, Vanegas played in all six of Colombia's matches and scored twice as the host nation reached the final.

Vanegas was called up for the 2023 FIFA Women's World Cup on 4 July 2023. On 30 July, she headed in a 97th-minute winner against Germany in Sydney, giving Colombia a 2–1 group-stage victory over the two-time world champions. Colombia went on to reach the quarter-finals.

She played at the 2024 CONCACAF W Gold Cup, scoring against Panama in the group stage, and was named on 5 July 2024 in the squad for the 2024 Summer Olympics.

Her cruciate ligament injury ruled her out of the 2025 Copa América Femenina and kept her out of the national team for close to a year, her last appearance before it having come against Argentina on 30 November 2024. She was recalled for Colombia's CONMEBOL Women's Nations League fixture away to Bolivia on 28 November 2025. On 14 April 2026 she scored in a 2–0 win over Chile in the same competition, and on 10 June she started as Colombia beat Paraguay 4–3 in Asunción to win the inaugural edition, a result that also secured qualification for the 2027 FIFA Women's World Cup.

== Career statistics ==
=== Club ===
As of match played 22 November 2026

Appearances and goals by club, season and competition
Club	Season	League			National cup (Note: Includes Copa de la Reina and Women's FA Cup)		League cup (Note: FA Women's League Cup)		Continental (Note: UEFA Women's Champions League)		Other (Note: Supercopa de España Femenina)		Total	
Club	Season	Division	Apps	Goals	Apps	Goals	Apps	Goals	Apps	Goals	Apps	Goals	Apps	Goals
Espanyol	2020–21	Primera División	33	3	1	0	—		—		—		34	3
Real Sociedad	2021–22	Primera División	26	2	2	0	—		—		—		28	2
Real Sociedad	2022–23	Liga F	26	3	1	0	—		1	0	2	0	30	3
Real Sociedad	2023–24	Liga F	20	1	5	2	—		—		—		25	3
Real Sociedad	2024–25	Liga F	11	3	1	0	—		—		—		12	3
Real Sociedad	Total		83	9	9	2	—		1	0	2	0	95	11
Brighton & Hove Albion	2025–26	Women's Super League	14	1	5	1	0	0	—		—		19	2
Brighton & Hove Albion	2026–27	Women's Super League	11	0	0	0	4	0	—		—		15	0
Brighton & Hove Albion	Total		25	1	5	1	4	0	—		—		34	2
Career total			141	13	15	3	4	0	1	0	2	0	163	16

=== International ===
As of match played 13 October 2026

Appearances and goals
National team	Year	Apps	Goals
Colombia	2018	1	1
Colombia	2019	4	1
Colombia	2021	4	2
Colombia	2022	16	3
Colombia	2023	15	1
Colombia	2024	11	1
Colombia	2025	1	0
Colombia	2026	10	2
Total		62	11

Scores and results list Colombia's goal tally first.

List of international goals scored by Manuela Vanegas
No.	Date	Venue	Opponent	Score	Result	Competition
1	21 July 2018	Estadio Moderno Julio Torres, Barranquilla, Colombia	Venezuela	2–0	3–2	2018 Central American and Caribbean Games
2	3 August 2019	Estadio Universidad San Marcos, Lima, Peru	Mexico	2–2	2–2	2019 Pan American Games
3	23 October 2021	Estadio Olímpico Pascual Guerrero, Cali, Colombia	Chile	2–0	2–0	Friendly
4	30 November 2021	Estadio Deportivo Cali, Palmira, Colombia	Uruguay	1–0	1–0	Friendly
5	8 July 2022	Estadio Olímpico Pascual Guerrero, Cali, Colombia	Paraguay	4–1	4–2	2022 Copa América Femenina
6	20 July 2022	Estadio Centenario, Armenia, Colombia	Chile	3–0	4–0	2022 Copa América Femenina
7	12 October 2022	Estadio Olímpico Pascual Guerrero, Cali, Colombia	Paraguay	2–0	4–0	Friendly
8	30 July 2023	Sydney Football Stadium, Sydney, Australia	Germany	2–1	2–1	2023 FIFA Women's World Cup
9	21 February 2024	Snapdragon Stadium, San Diego, United States	Panama	4–0	6–0	2024 CONCACAF W Gold Cup
10	14 April 2026	Estadio Olímpico Pascual Guerrero, Cali, Colombia	Chile	2–0	2–0	2025–26 CONMEBOL Women's Nations League
11	13 October 2026	Centro Nacional de Alto Rendimiento, Maneiro, Venezuela	Venezuela	1–0	2–1	Friendly

== Honours ==
Colombia

- CONMEBOL Women's Nations League: 2025–26
- Pan American Games gold medal: 2019
- Copa América Femenina runner-up: 2022
