= Mistrató =

Coordinates: 5°18′N 75°53′W

Mistrato
- Municipality and town
- Flag Coat of arms

- Location of the municipality and town of Mistrato in the Risaralda Department of Colombia.
- Country: Colombia
- Department: Risaralda Department

Area
  - Total: 690 km^{2} (270 sq mi)
- Elevation: 1,570 m (5,150 ft)

Population (2023)
  - Total: 17,527
  - Density: 25/km^{2} (66/sq mi)
- Time zone: UTC-5 (Colombia Standard Time)

Mistrato is a town and municipality in the Department of Risaralda, Colombia. About 86 km away from the capital Pereira. In 2023 the town had an estimated population of 17,527.

== Climate ==
Mistrató has a subtropical highland climate with an average annual temperature of 20°C.
