= 2025–26 CONMEBOL Women's Nations League =

Tournament details
- Dates: 24 October 2025 – 9 June 2026
- Teams: 9 (from 1 confederation)

Final positions
- Champions: Colombia (1st title)
- Runners-up: Argentina
- Third place: Venezuela
- Fourth place: Ecuador

Tournament statistics
- Matches played: 36
- Goals scored: 110 (3.06 per match)
- Top scorer(s): (Paraguay) Claudia Martínez (6 goals)

The 2025–26 CONMEBOL Women's Nations League (Spanish: 2025–26 CONMEBOL Liga de Naciones Femenina) was the inaugural edition of the CONMEBOL Women's Nations League, an international women's football competition contested by the senior women's national teams of the member associations of CONMEBOL. It was held from 24 October 2025 to 9 June 2026.

The tournament served as the CONMEBOL qualifiers for the 2027 FIFA Women's World Cup in Brazil. The top two teams, Colombia and Argentina, qualified for the Women's World Cup and will join Brazil, which qualified automatically as hosts. The next two best-placed teams, Venezuela and Ecuador, advanced to the inter-confederation play-offs.

== Background ==
On 12 December 2024, following a CONMEBOL Council meeting, it was announced the creation of the South American qualifier for the FIFA Women's World Cup starting with the 2027 edition in Brazil. This new tournament would be CONMEBOL's new qualification pathway for FIFA's top women's national team tournament, replacing the Copa América Femenina, which from its first edition in 1991 (then called the South American Women's Football Championship) until the 2022 edition had been the competition that determined CONMEBOL's representatives to the FIFA Women's World Cup.

The tournament was officially launched on 19 July 2025 and it was formally named the CONMEBOL Women's Nations League, confirming the start date for after the 2025 Copa América Femenina.

== Format ==
The competition format consisted of a single round-robin tournament in which the nine teams played each other once, with each team playing four home and four away matches for a total of eight matches per team in nine matchdays. Brazil did not participate as they were automatically qualified for the 2027 Women's World Cup as hosts, so there was one team left out in each matchday.

The fixtures were determined by a draw held on 31 July 2025, 14:00 PYT (UTC−3). Pot 1 contained the nine teams entering qualification, and Pot 2 contained positions 1–9. Each team was drawn to one of the nine positions (E1–E9), thus defining the order of the matches in the predetermined schedule.

== Entrants ==
Nine national teams from CONMEBOL entered qualification. Brazil were excluded as they had automatically qualified to the 2027 Women's World Cup as hosts.

Draw position	Team	FIFA Rankings (Note: As of the draw)
E1	Paraguay	45
E2	Peru	77
E3	Bolivia	105
E4	Colombia	18
E5	Chile	39
E6	Venezuela	48
E7	Argentina	32
E8	Ecuador	67
E9	Uruguay	63

== Schedule ==
The predetermined schedule was completed once the draw was made. The qualifying matches were held on dates that fell within the FIFA International Match Calendar, with at least three days of rest between matches.

There were a total of nine matchdays, four in 2025 and five in 2026.

Matchday	Date	Ref.
Matchday 1	24 October 2025	
Matchday 2	28 October 2025	
Matchday 3	28 November 2025	
Matchday 4	2 December 2025	
Matchday 5	10 April 2026	
Matchday 6	14 April 2026	
Matchday 7	18 April 2026	
Matchday 8	5 June 2026	
Matchday 9	9 June 2026	

== Standings ==
Pos	Team	Pld	W	D	L	GF	GA	GD	Pts	Qualification	(Colombia)	(Argentina)	(Venezuela)	(Ecuador)	(Peru)	(Paraguay)	(Chile)	(Uruguay)	(Bolivia)
1	Colombia (C)	8	6	2	0	16	7	+9	20	2027 FIFA Women's World Cup	—	—	2–1	—	4–1	—	2–0	1–0	—
2	Argentina	8	5	3	0	18	5	+13	18	2027 FIFA Women's World Cup	0–0	—	—	—	1–1	3–1	—	—	8–0
3	Venezuela	8	3	3	2	19	6	+13	12	Inter-confederation play-offs	—	1–2	—	—	6–0	—	0–0	—	8–0
4	Ecuador	8	3	2	3	8	6	+2	11	Inter-confederation play-offs	1–2	0–1	0–0	—	1–0	—	—	—	—
5	Peru	8	3	2	3	12	15	−3	11		—	—	—	—	—	1–1	3–1	2–1	4–0
6	Paraguay	8	3	1	4	17	11	+6	10		3–4	—	1–2	2–0	—	—	—	1–0	—
7	Chile	8	3	1	4	11	9	+2	10		—	0–1	—	1–2	—	1–0	—	—	5–0
8	Uruguay	8	1	3	4	7	11	−4	6		—	2–2	1–1	0–0	—	—	1–3	—	—
9	Bolivia	8	0	1	7	2	40	−38	1		1–1	—	—	0–4	—	0–8	—	1–2	—

Source: CONMEBOL
(C) Champions

== Matches ==
=== Matchday 1 ===
24 October 2025
17:00 UTC−4

Bolivia	0–4	Ecuador
	Report (FIFA); Report (CONMEBOL)	Rodríguez 3'; Cedeño 50'; Barahona 78'; Flores 86'

Estadio Municipal de El Alto, El Alto
Referee: Anahí Fernández (Uruguay)

24 October 2025
17:00 UTC−4

Venezuela	0–0	Chile
	Report (FIFA); Report (CONMEBOL)

Estadio Metropolitano de Cabudare, Cabudare
Referee: Danna Victorino (Colombia)

24 October 2025
18:00 UTC−5

Colombia	4–1	Peru
Santos 6' (pen.), 89'; Montoya 74'; Chacón 90+6'	Report (FIFA); Report (CONMEBOL)	Núñez 48'

Estadio Atanasio Girardot, Medellín
Referee: Laura Fortunato (Argentina)

24 October 2025
20:00 UTC−3

Argentina	3–1	Paraguay
Cometti 17'; Holzheier 22'; Pereyra 45+4'	Report (FIFA); Report (CONMEBOL)	Barreto 45+2'

Estadio Diego Armando Maradona, Buenos Aires
Referee: Edina Alves (Brazil)

=== Matchday 2 ===
28 October 2025
18:00 UTC−3

Chile	5–0	Bolivia
Keefe 3' (pen.), 9'; Pinilla 17'; Jiménez 45+1'; López 46'	Report (FIFA); Report (CONMEBOL)

Estadio El Teniente, Rancagua
Referee: Marcelly Zambrano (Ecuador)

28 October 2025
18:00 UTC−3

Uruguay	2–2	Argentina
Lacoste 34'; Aquino 72'	Report (FIFA); Report (CONMEBOL)	M. Pereyra 48'; Paz 89'

Estadio Centenario, Montevideo
Referee: Emikar Calderas (Venezuela)

28 October 2025
20:00 UTC−3

Paraguay	1–2	Venezuela
Chamorro 37'	Report (FIFA); Report (CONMEBOL)	Carrasco 20'; García 69'

Estadio Tigo La Huerta, Asunción
Referee: Dione Rissios (Chile)

28 October 2025
18:00 UTC−5

Ecuador	1–2	Colombia
Bolaños 52' (pen.)	Report (FIFA); Report (CONMEBOL)	Santos 45' (pen.); Montoya 71'

Estadio Rodrigo Paz Delgado, Quito
Referee: Zulma Quiñónez (Paraguay)

=== Matchday 3 ===
28 November 2025
16:00 UTC−5

Peru	3–1	Chile
A. García 30'; Campoverde 62'; Bilcape 65'	Report (FIFA); Report (CONMEBOL)	López 41'

Estadio Garcilaso, Cusco
Referee: María Victoria Daza (Colombia)

28 November 2025
17:00 UTC−4

Bolivia	1–1	Colombia
Turihuano 46'	Report (FIFA); Report (CONMEBOL)	Rodríguez 76'

Estadio Hernando Siles, La Paz (Note: The Bolivia v Colombia match, originally scheduled to be played at Estadio Municipal de El Alto, El Alto, was relocated to Estadio Hernando Siles, La Paz by decision of the Bolivian Football Federation.)
Referee: Stefani Escobar (Venezuela)

28 November 2025
20:00 UTC−3

Paraguay	1–0	Uruguay
C. Martínez 90+6'	Report (FIFA); Report (CONMEBOL)

Estadio Tigo La Huerta, Asunción
Referee: Laura Fortunato (Argentina)

28 November 2025
18:00 UTC−5

Ecuador	0–0	Venezuela
	Report (FIFA); Report (CONMEBOL)

Estadio Olímpico Atahualpa, Quito (Note: The Ecuador v Venezuela match, originally scheduled to be played at Estadio Rodrigo Paz Delgado, Quito, was relocated to Estadio Olímpico Atahualpa, Quito as the Estadio Rodrigo Paz Delgado was reserved for a match between LDU Quito and Independiente del Valle for the 2025 LigaPro Serie A.)
Referee: Adriana Farfán (Bolivia)

=== Matchday 4 ===
2 December 2025
18:00 UTC−3

Uruguay	0–0	Ecuador
	Report (FIFA); Report (CONMEBOL)

Estadio Alfredo Victor Viera, Montevideo
Referee: Charly Deretti (Brazil)

2 December 2025
19:00 UTC−4

Venezuela	6–0	Peru
Castellanos 13'; García 36'; Martínez 42'; Higuera 48', 52'; Flórez 85'	Report (FIFA); Report (CONMEBOL)

Estadio Metropolitano de Cabudare, Cabudare
Referee: Zulma Quiñónez (Paraguay)

2 December 2025
20:00 UTC−3 (Note: The Argentina v Bolivia match, originally scheduled at 18:00 local time, was rescheduled to 20:00 local time.)

Argentina	8–0	Bolivia
Gramaglia 7', 51'; Cometti 31'; Bonsegundo 43' (pen.), 90+4'; Núñez 60', 89'; Altgelt 73'	Report (FIFA); Report (CONMEBOL)

Estadio Florencio Sola, Banfield
Referee: Nadia Fuques (Uruguay)

2 December 2025
20:00 UTC−3

Chile	1–0	Paraguay
Aedo 33'	Report (FIFA); Report (CONMEBOL)

Estadio El Teniente, Rancagua
Referee: Milagros Arruela (Peru)

=== Matchday 5 ===
10 April 2026
16:00 UTC−5 (Note: The Peru v Uruguay and Peru v Paraguay matches, originally scheduled at 18:00 local time, were rescheduled to 16:00 local time.)

Peru	2–1	Uruguay
García 33'; Arévalo 71'	Report (FIFA); Report (CONMEBOL)	González 25' (pen.)

Estadio Garcilaso, Cusco
Referee: Paula Fernández (Colombia)

10 April 2026
20:00 UTC−3

Paraguay	2–0	Ecuador
Ramos 32'; Arrieta 90+8' (pen.)	Report (FIFA); Report (CONMEBOL)

Estadio Defensores del Chaco, Asunción
Referee: Anahí Fernández (Uruguay)

10 April 2026
20:00 UTC−4

Chile	0–1	Argentina
	Report (FIFA); Report (CONMEBOL)	Bonsegundo 42' (pen.)

Estadio Elías Figueroa Brander, Valparaíso
Referee: Charly Deretti (Brazil)

10 April 2026
20:00 UTC−5

Colombia	2–1	Venezuela
Santos 22' (pen.); Robledo 80'	Report (FIFA); Report (CONMEBOL)	Herrera 10'

Estadio Olimpico Pascual Guerrero, Cali
Referee: Edina Alves (Brazil)

=== Matchday 6 ===
14 April 2026
16:00 UTC−5

Peru	1–1	Paraguay
Campoverde 51'	Report (FIFA); Report (CONMEBOL)	Tacilla 18' (o.g.)

Estadio Garcilaso, Cusco
Referee: Adriana Farfán (Bolivia)

14 April 2026
17:00 UTC−4

Bolivia	1–2	Uruguay
Veizaga 78'	Report (FIFA); Report (CONMEBOL)	Pizarro 61', 87'

Estadio Municipal de El Alto, El Alto
Referee: Elizabeth Tintaya (Peru)

14 April 2026
19:00 UTC−4

Venezuela	1–2	Argentina
Olivieri 86'	Report (FIFA); Report (CONMEBOL)	Holzheier 7'; Bonsegundo 57'

Estadio Metropolitano de Cabudare, Cabudare
Referee: Brenda Cisternas (Chile)

14 April 2026
20:00 UTC−5

Colombia	2–0	Chile
Caicedo 14'; Vanegas 90+6' (pen.)	Report (FIFA); Report (CONMEBOL)

Estadio Olimpico Pascual Guerrero, Cali
Referee: Marcelly Zambrano (Ecuador)

=== Matchday 7 ===
18 April 2026
18:00 UTC−3

Uruguay	1–3	Chile
Pa. González 5'	Report (FIFA); Report (CONMEBOL)	Valencia 9'; Olivares 70'; Pardo 76'

Estadio Centenario, Montevideo
Referee: Laura Fortunato (Argentina)

18 April 2026
16:00 UTC−5

Ecuador	1–0	Peru
Bolaños 77' (pen.)	Report (FIFA); Report (CONMEBOL)

Estadio Olímpico Atahualpa, Quito
Referee: Daiane Muniz (Brazil)

18 April 2026
19:00 UTC−4

Venezuela	8–0	Bolivia
Flórez 2'; García 45+1'; Olivieri 45+8'; Martinet 52', 75'; Moreno 68', 90+1'; Castellanos 84' (pen.)	Report (FIFA); Report (CONMEBOL)

Estadio Metropolitano de Cabudare, Cabudare
Referee: Nadia Fuques (Uruguay)

18 April 2026
20:00 UTC−3

Argentina	0–0	Colombia
	Report (FIFA); Report (CONMEBOL)

Estadio Ciudad de Lanús, Lanús
Referee: Emikar Calderas (Venezuela)

=== Matchday 8 ===
5 June 2026
19:00 UTC−4

Bolivia	0–8	Paraguay
	Report (FIFA); Report (CONMEBOL)	C. Martínez 19', 23', 51', 58'; Chamorro 45+1'; Garay 48'; Fernández 52'; Ayala 73'

Estadio Municipal de El Alto, El Alto
Referee: Emikar Calderas (Venezuela)

5 June 2026
20:00 UTC−3

Argentina	1–1	Peru
Diz 75'	Report (FIFA); Report (CONMEBOL)	Cox 85'

Estadio Ciudad de Lanús, Lanús (Note: The Argentina v Peru match, originally scheduled to be played at Estadio Florencio Sola, Banfield, was relocated twice.)
Referee: Zulma Quiñónez (Paraguay)

5 June 2026
18:00 UTC−5

Colombia	1–0	Uruguay
Robledo 14'	Report (FIFA); Report (CONMEBOL)

Estadio Olimpico Pascual Guerrero, Cali
Referee: Verónica Guazhambo (Ecuador)

5 June 2026
19:00 UTC−4

Chile	1–2	Ecuador
Pardo 73'	Report (FIFA); Report (CONMEBOL)	Cuadra 36'; Bolaños 80' (pen.)

Estadio Nacional Julio Martínez Prádanos, Santiago
Referee: Anahí Fernández (Uruguay)

=== Matchday 9 ===
9 June 2026
18:00 UTC−5

Peru	4–0	Bolivia
García 24' (pen.); Campoverde 57'; Cagnina 62'; Arévalo 83'	Report (FIFA); Report (CONMEBOL)

Estadio Miguel Grau, Callao
Referee: Paula Fernández (Colombia)

9 June 2026
20:00 UTC−3

Paraguay	3–4	Colombia
Quintana 3' (pen.); C. Martínez 9'; Chamorro 45+1'	Report (FIFA); Report (CONMEBOL)	Guzmán 7', 89'; Restrepo 43'; Caicedo 60'

Estadio Defensores del Chaco, Asunción
Referee: Daiane Muniz (Brazil)

9 June 2026
20:00 UTC−3

Uruguay	1–1	Venezuela
Pa. González 52'	Report (FIFA); Report (CONMEBOL)	Castellanos 58'

Estadio Centenario, Montevideo
Referee: Milagros Arruela (Peru)

9 June 2026
18:00 UTC−5

Ecuador	0–1	Argentina
	Report (FIFA); Report (CONMEBOL)	Bonsegundo 90+5'

Estadio Olímpico Atahualpa, Quito
Referee: Edina Alves (Brazil)

== Goalscorers ==
There were 110 goals scored in 36 matches, for an average of 3.06 goals per match.

6 goals

- (Paraguay) Claudia Martínez

5 goals

- (Argentina) Florencia Bonsegundo

4 goals

- (Colombia) Leicy Santos

3 goals

- (Ecuador) Nayely Bolaños
- (Paraguay) Lice Chamorro
- (Peru) Luz Campoverde
- (Peru) Alesia García
- (Uruguay) Pamela González
- (Venezuela) Deyna Castellanos
- (Venezuela) Gabriela García

2 goals

- (Argentina) Aldana Cometti
- (Argentina) Paulina Gramaglia
- (Argentina) Agostina Holzheier
- (Argentina) Kishi Núñez
- (Argentina) Maricel Pereyra
- (Chile) Sonya Keefe
- (Chile) Nayadet López
- (Chile) Vaitiare Pardo
- (Colombia) Linda Caicedo
- (Colombia) Ana María Guzmán
- (Colombia) Daniela Montoya
- (Colombia) Gisela Robledo
- (Peru) Sandra Arévalo
- (Uruguay) Esperanza Pizarro
- (Venezuela) Génesis Flórez
- (Venezuela) Enyerliannys Higuera
- (Venezuela) Lou Martinet
- (Venezuela) Lourdes Moreno
- (Venezuela) Bárbara Olivieri

1 goal

- (Argentina) Francisca Altgelt
- (Argentina) Mercedes Diz
- (Argentina) Annika Paz
- (Bolivia) Sonia Turihuano
- (Bolivia) Cielo Veizaga
- (Chile) Yanara Aedo
- (Chile) Yastin Jiménez
- (Chile) Lesly Olivares
- (Chile) Fernanda Pinilla
- (Chile) Mary Valencia
- (Colombia) Ivonne Chacón
- (Colombia) Marcela Restrepo
- (Colombia) Gabriela Rodríguez
- (Colombia) Manuela Vanegas
- (Ecuador) Milagro Barahona
- (Ecuador) Justine Cuadra
- (Ecuador) Stefany Cedeño
- (Ecuador) Karen Flores
- (Ecuador) Mayerli Rodríguez
- (Paraguay) Camila Arrieta
- (Paraguay) Monserrath Ayala
- (Paraguay) Liz Barreto
- (Paraguay) Rebeca Fernández
- (Paraguay) Griselda Garay
- (Paraguay) Dulce Quintana
- (Paraguay) Cindy Ramos
- (Peru) Raquel Bilcape
- (Peru) Grace Cagnina
- (Peru) Cherrie Cox
- (Peru) Pierina Núñez
- (Uruguay) Belén Aquino
- (Uruguay) Stephanie Lacoste
- (Venezuela) Raiderlin Carrasco
- (Venezuela) Verónica Herrera
- (Venezuela) Bárbara Martínez

1 own goal

- (Peru) Yomira Tacilla (against Paraguay)
