= CONMEBOL Women's Nations League =

International women's association football tournament

- Organiser(s): CONMEBOL
- Founded: 2025; 1 year ago
- Region: South America (CONMEBOL)
- 2025–26 CONMEBOL Women's Nations League

The CONMEBOL Women's Nations League (Spanish: Liga de Naciones Femenina, Portuguese: Liga das Nações Feminina) is an international women's football competition contested by the senior women's national teams of the member associations of CONMEBOL, the regional governing body of South America. It was announced in July 2025 and the first edition took place from October 2025 to June 2026. The tournament serves as qualification for the FIFA Women's World Cup as a replacement for the Copa América Femenina.

== Results ==
Season	Women's World Cup qualifiers		Play-off qualifiers	
Season	Winners	Runners-up	Third place	Fourth place
2025–26	Colombia	Argentina	Venezuela	Ecuador
