= 2025 Copa América Femenina knockout stage =

Knockout stage of the 2025 Copa América Femenina

The knockout stage of 2025 Copa América Femenina began on 28 July 2025 with the fifth place play-off and ended on 2 August 2025 with the final.

== Format ==
In the knockout phase, if the fifth-place play-off, semi-finals and third-place play-off are level at the end of 90 minutes of normal playing time, no extra time will be played and the match will be decided by a direct penalty shoot-out. If the final is level at the end of the normal playing time, extra time will be played (two periods of 15 minutes each), where each team will be allowed to make an extra substitution. If still tied after extra time, the final will be decided by a penalty shoot-out to determine the champions.

== Qualified teams ==
The top two placed teams from each of the two groups qualified for the knockout stage.

| Group | Winners | Runners-up |
|---|---|---|
| A | Argentina | Uruguay |
| B | Brazil | Colombia |

== Bracket ==
Semi-finals
28 July – Quito (RPD)
Argentina | 0 (4)
Colombia (p) | 0 (5)
29 July – Quito (RPD)
Brazil | 5
Uruguay | 1

Final
2 August – Quito (RPD)
Colombia | 4 (4)
Brazil (p) | 4 (5)

| Fifth place match |
| 28 July – Quito (IDV) |
| Chile | 0 |
| Paraguay | 1 |

| Third place match |
| 1 August – Quito (RPD) |
| Argentina (p) | 2 (5) |
| Uruguay | 2 (4) |

All times are local, ECT (UTC−5).

== Fifth place play-off ==
The winners of the fifth place match qualified to the 2027 Pan American Games.

28 July 2025
16:00

| Chile | 0–1 | Paraguay |
|---|---|---|
| | Report (WEB) Report (CONMEBOL) | Arrieta 90+2' |

Estadio Banco Guayaquil, Quito
Referee: Emikar Calderas (Venezuela)

| Chile | Paraguay |

| GK | 1 | Antonia Canales |
| DF | 3 | Fernanda Ramírez |
| DF | 18 | Camila Sáez |
| DF | 17 | Fernanda Pinilla | (yellow card) 19' |
| MF | 21 | Mary Valencia | | (substituted off) 46' |
| MF | 6 | Yastin Jiménez | (yellow card) 64' | (substituted off) 66' |
| MF | 5 | Nayadet López |
| MF | 14 | Vaitiare Pardo | | (substituted off) 87' |
| FW | 9 | Sonya Keefe |
| FW | 20 | Anaís Álvarez | | (substituted off) 77' |
| FW | 8 | Karen Araya (c) |
Substitutes:
| GK | 12 | Ryann Torrero |
| GK | 23 | Gabriela Bórquez |
| DF | 2 | Michelle Olivares |
| DF | 4 | Catalina Figueroa |
| DF | 13 | Claudia Salfate | | (substituted on) 87' |
| DF | 22 | Rosario Balmaceda | | (substituted on) 46' |
| MF | 10 | Yanara Aedo | | (substituted on) 77' |
| MF | 11 | Yessenia López |
| MF | 15 | Gisela Pino |
| FW | 7 | Yenny Acuña | | (substituted on) 66' |
| FW | 16 | Franchesca Caniguán |
| FW | 19 | Pamela Cabezas |
Manager:
(Chile) Luis Mena

| GK | 12 | Soledad Belotto |
| DF | 14 | Naomi de León |
| DF | 5 | Dahiana Bogarín |
| DF | 16 | Fiorela Martínez | (yellow card) 58' | (substituted off) 76' |
| MF | 23 | Liz Barreto |
| MF | 21 | Cindy Ramos |
| MF | 8 | Celeste Aguilera |
| MF | 17 | Camila Arrieta |
| FW | 11 | Fátima Acosta | | (substituted off) 77' |
| FW | 9 | Lice Chamorro (c) |
| FW | 18 | Claudia Martínez |
Substitutes:
| GK | 1 | Cristina Recalde |
| GK | 22 | Araceli Legüizamón |
| DF | 2 | Camila Barbosa |
| DF | 3 | Daysy Bareiro |
| DF | 4 | Deisy Ojeda | | (substituted on) 76' |
| DF | 13 | María Martínez |
| DF | 15 | Danna Garcete |
| MF | 6 | Fanny Godoy |
| MF | 7 | Ramona Martínez |
| MF | 19 | Belén Riveros |
| MF | 20 | Diana Benítez |
| FW | 10 | Jessica Martínez | | (substituted on) 77' |
Manager:
(Brazil) Fábio Fukumoto

Player of the Match:
Camila Arrieta (Paraguay)

Assistant referees:
Migdalia Rodríguez (Venezuela)
Francis García (Venezuela)
Fourth official:
Milagros Arruela (Peru)

== Semi-finals ==
The winners of the semi-finals qualified for the football tournament at the 2028 Summer Olympics. The losers qualified for the 2027 Pan American Games women's football tournament

=== Colombia vs Argentina ===
28 July 2025
19:00

| Argentina | 0–0 | Colombia |
|---|---|---|
| | Report (WEB) Report (CONMEBOL) |
Penalties
| Bonsegundo (penalty scored); Braun (penalty scored); Gramaglia (penalty missed); Cometti (penalty scored); Núñez (penalty scored); Stábile (penalty missed) | 4–5 | (penalty scored) Usme; (penalty scored) Carabalí; (penalty scored) Paví; (penalty missed) Ramírez; (penalty scored) Caicedo; (penalty scored) Bonilla |

Estadio Rodrigo Paz Delgado, Quito
Referee: Ivana Projkovska (North Macedonia)

| Argentina | Colombia |

| GK | 1 | Solana Pereyra |
| DF | 4 | Catalina Roggerone |
| DF | 13 | Sophia Braun |
| DF | 6 | Aldana Cometti (c) |
| DF | 14 | Milagros Iara Martín | | (substituted off) 70' |
| MF | 16 | Sofía Domínguez | | (substituted off) 80' |
| MF | 5 | Vanina Preininger |
| MF | 8 | Daiana Falfán |
| MF | 10 | Maricel Pereyra | | (substituted off) 80' |
| FW | 11 | Yamila Rodríguez | (yellow card) 44' | (substituted off) 66' |
| FW | 15 | Florencia Bonsegundo |
Substitutes:
| GK | 12 | Renata Masciarelli |
| GK | 23 | Abigaíl Chaves |
| DF | 2 | Adriana Sachs |
| DF | 3 | Eliana Stábile | | (substituted on) 70' |
| MF | 19 | Agostina Holzheier |
| MF | 20 | Virginia Gómez |
| FW | 7 | Margarita Giménez | | (substituted on) 80' |
| FW | 9 | Kishi Núñez | | (substituted on) 66' |
| FW | 17 | Francisca Altgelt |
| FW | 18 | Carolina Troncoso |
| FW | 21 | Paulina Gramaglia | | (substituted on) 80' |
| FW | 22 | Betina Soriano |
Manager:
(Argentina) Germán Portanova

| GK | 12 | Katherine Tapia |
| DF | 17 | Carolina Arias (c) |
| DF | 3 | Daniela Arias | (yellow card) 38' | (substituted off) 76' |
| DF | 16 | Jorelyn Carabalí | (yellow card) 69' |
| DF | 22 | Daniela Caracas |
| MF | 10 | Leicy Santos |
| MF | 5 | Lorena Bedoya | | (substituted off) 75' |
| MF | 11 | Catalina Usme |
| FW | 21 | Valerin Loboa | | (substituted off) 76' |
| FW | 9 | Mayra Ramírez |
| FW | 18 | Linda Caicedo | (yellow card) 49' |
Substitutes:
| GK | 1 | Catalina Pérez |
| GK | 13 | Luisa Agudelo |
| DF | 2 | Mary Álvarez |
| DF | 4 | Ana María Guzmán |
| DF | 14 | Ángela Barón |
| DF | 19 | Yirleidis Minota |
| MF | 6 | Daniela Montoya | | (substituted on) 75' |
| MF | 8 | Marcela Restrepo |
| MF | 20 | Ilana Izquierdo |
| FW | 7 | Manuela Paví | | (substituted on) 76' |
| FW | 15 | Wendy Bonilla | | (substituted on) 76' |
| FW | 23 | Liced Serna |
Manager:
(Colombia) Ángelo Marsiglia

Player of the Match:
Katherine Tapia (Colombia)

Assistant referees:
Giulia Tempestilli (Italy)
Iragartze Fernández (Spain)
Fourth official:
Marcelly Zambrano (Peru)

=== Brazil vs Uruguay ===
29 July 2025
19:00

| Brazil | 5–1 | Uruguay |
|---|---|---|
| Amanda Gutierres 11', 65'; Gio Garbelini 13'; Marta 27' (pen.); Dudinha 86' | Report (WEB) Report (CONMEBOL) | Isa Haas 51' (o.g.) |

Estadio Rodrigo Paz Delgado, Quito
Referee: Zulma Quiñónez (Paraguay)

| Brazil | Uruguay |

| GK | 14 | Cláudia |
| DF | 2 | Antônia |
| DF | 23 | Isa Haas | (yellow card) 28' | (substituted off) 59' |
| DF | 3 | Tarciane | | (substituted off) 59' |
| MF | 22 | Luany |
| MF | 5 | Duda Sampaio |
| MF | 8 | Angelina | | (substituted off) 46' |
| MF | 16 | Fátima Dutra |
| MF | 10 | Marta (c) | | (substituted off) 79' |
| FW | 9 | Amanda Gutierres |
| FW | 11 | Gio Garbelini | | (substituted off) 46' |
Substitutes:
| GK | 1 | Lorena |
| GK | 12 | Camila Rodrigues |
| DF | 4 | Kaká | (yellow card) 84' | (substituted on) 59' |
| DF | 6 | Yasmim |
| DF | 13 | Fe Palermo |
| DF | 20 | Mariza | | (substituted on) 59' |
| MF | 15 | Ary Borges |
| MF | 17 | Vitória Yaya | | (substituted on) 46' |
| FW | 7 | Kerolin | | (substituted on) 79' |
| FW | 18 | Gabi Portilho |
| FW | 19 | Jhonson |
| FW | 21 | Dudinha | | (substituted on) 46' |
Manager:
(Brazil) Arthur Elias

| GK | 12 | Agustina Sánchez | (yellow card) 71' |
| DF | 20 | Ángela Gómez | | (substituted off) 80' |
| DF | 16 | Yannel Correa |
| DF | 3 | Daiana Farías | (yellow card) 63' | (substituted off) 85' |
| DF | 21 | Juliana Viera |
| MF | 14 | Alaides Bonilla | | (substituted off) 45' |
| MF | 2 | Stephanie Lacoste |
| MF | 8 | Ximena Velazco (c) |
| MF | 19 | Wendy Carballo | (yellow card) 8' |
| FW | 10 | Belén Aquino |
| FW | 11 | Esperanza Pizarro |
Substitutes:
| GK | 1 | Romina Olmedo |
| GK | 13 | Sofía Olivera |
| DF | 4 | Carina Felipe |
| DF | 7 | Stephanie Tregartten |
| DF | 15 | Fátima Barone | | (substituted on) 85' |
| DF | 18 | Alison Latúa |
| MF | 5 | Micaela Fitipaldi | | (substituted on) 80' |
| MF | 6 | Sindy Ramírez |
| MF | 9 | Pamela González |
| MF | 17 | Pilar González | | (substituted on) 45' |
| MF | 22 | Ilana Guedes |
| FW | 23 | Yamila Dornelles | (yellow card) 57' (yellow-red card) 58' |
Manager:
(Uruguay) Ariel Longo

Player of the Match:
Marta (Brazil)

Assistant referees:
Nadia Weiler (Paraguay)
Nancy Fernández (Paraguay)
Fourth official:
Adriana Farfán (Bolivia)

== Third place play-off ==
The winner eventually advanced to the AFC–CONMEBOL play-off match for the football tournament at the 2028 Summer Olympics, after the FIFA Council's official announcement on the number of spots distributed for confederations on 17 December 2025.

1 August 2025
19:00

| Argentina | 2–2 | Uruguay |
|---|---|---|
| Cometti 24'; Bonsegundo 83' (pen.) | Report (WEB) Report (CONMEBOL) | Pizarro 35'; Viera 45' |
Penalties
| Bonsegundo (penalty scored); Braun (penalty scored); Roggerone (penalty scored); Cometti (penalty scored); Núñez (penalty scored) | 5–4 | (penalty scored) Pa. González; (penalty missed) Lacoste; (penalty scored) Ramírez; (penalty scored) Olivera; (penalty scored) Pizarro |

Estadio Rodrigo Paz Delgado, Quito
Referee: Emikar Calderas (Venezuela)

| Argentina | Uruguay |

| GK | 1 | Solana Pereyra |
| DF | 4 | Catalina Roggerone |
| DF | 13 | Sophia Braun |
| DF | 6 | Aldana Cometti (c) |
| DF | 14 | Milagros Iara Martín | (substituted off) 81' |
| MF | 22 | Betina Soriano | (substituted off) 81' |
| MF | 5 | Vanina Preininger |
| MF | 8 | Daiana Falfán | (substituted off) 66' |
| FW | 11 | Yamila Rodríguez | (substituted off) 66' |
| FW | 15 | Florencia Bonsegundo |
| FW | 10 | Maricel Pereyra | (substituted off) 66' |
Substitutes:
| GK | 12 | Renata Masciarelli |
| GK | 23 | Abigaíl Chaves |
| DF | 2 | Adriana Sachs |
| DF | 3 | Eliana Stábile | (substituted on) 81' |
| MF | 16 | Sofía Domínguez | (substituted on) 66' |
| MF | 19 | Agostina Holzheier | (substituted on) 66' |
| MF | 20 | Virginia Gómez |
| FW | 7 | Margarita Giménez |
| FW | 9 | Kishi Núñez | (substituted on) 66' |
| FW | 17 | Francisca Altgelt |
| FW | 18 | Carolina Troncoso | (substituted on) 81' |
| FW | 21 | Paulina Gramaglia |
Manager:
(Argentina) Germán Portanova

| GK | 12 | Agustina Sánchez | | (substituted off) 90+4' |
| DF | 4 | Carina Felipe | (yellow card) 90+3' |
| DF | 2 | Stephanie Lacoste |
| DF | 15 | Fátima Barone |
| DF | 7 | Stephanie Tregartten | | (substituted off) 90+4' |
| MF | 19 | Wendy Carballo | | (substituted off) 84' |
| MF | 8 | Ximena Velazco | (yellow card) 65' |
| MF | 9 | Pamela González (c) |
| MF | 21 | Juliana Viera |
| FW | 10 | Belén Aquino | | (substituted off) 70' |
| FW | 11 | Esperanza Pizarro |
Substitutes:
| GK | 1 | Romina Olmedo |
| GK | 13 | Sofía Olivera | | (substituted on) 90+4' |
| DF | 3 | Daiana Farías |
| DF | 16 | Yannel Correa |
| DF | 18 | Alison Latúa |
| MF | 5 | Micaela Fitipaldi | | (substituted on) 84' |
| MF | 6 | Sindy Ramírez | | (substituted on) 90+4' |
| MF | 17 | Pilar González |
| MF | 20 | Ángela Gómez | | (substituted on) 70' |
| MF | 22 | Ilana Guedes |
| FW | 14 | Alaides Paz |
| FW | 23 | Yamila Dornelles |
Manager:
(Uruguay) Ariel Longo

Player of the Match:
Florencia Bonsegundo (Argentina)

Assistant referees:
Migdalia Rodríguez (Venezuela)
Francis García (Venezuela)
Fourth official:
Marcelly Zambrano (Ecuador)

== Final ==
2 August 2025
16:00

| Colombia | 4–4 (a.e.t.) | Brazil |
|---|---|---|
| Caicedo 25'; Tarciane 69' (o.g.); Ramírez 88'; Santos 115' | Report (WEB) Report (CONMEBOL) | Angelina 45+9' (pen.); Amanda Gutierres 80'; Marta 90+6', 105' |
Penalties
| Usme (penalty scored); Restrepo (penalty scored); Paví (penalty missed); Santos (penalty missed); Caicedo (penalty scored); Bonilla (penalty scored); Carabalí (penalty missed) | 4–5 | (penalty scored) Tarciane; (penalty missed) Angelina; (penalty scored) Amanda Gutierres; (penalty scored) Mariza; (penalty missed) Marta; (penalty scored) Jhonson; (penalty scored) Luany |

Estadio Rodrigo Paz Delgado, Quito
Referee: Dione Rissios (Chile)

| Colombia | Brazil |

| GK | 12 | Katherine Tapia | (yellow card) 45+3' |
| DF | 17 | Carolina Arias (c) | | (substituted off) 107' |
| DF | 3 | Daniela Arias | (yellow card) 40' |
| DF | 16 | Jorelyn Carabalí | (yellow card) 45+7' |
| DF | 22 | Daniela Caracas |
| MF | 10 | Leicy Santos |
| MF | 5 | Lorena Bedoya | (yellow card) 32' | (substituted off) 107' |
| MF | 20 | Ilana Izquierdo | | (substituted off) 86' |
| FW | 21 | Valerin Loboa | | (substituted off) 72' |
| FW | 9 | Mayra Ramírez | | (substituted off) 90+5' |
| FW | 18 | Linda Caicedo |
Substitutes:
| GK | 1 | Catalina Pérez |
| GK | 13 | Luisa Agudelo |
| DF | 2 | Mary Álvarez |
| DF | 4 | Ana María Guzmán |
| DF | 14 | Ángela Barón |
| DF | 19 | Yirleidis Minota |
| MF | 6 | Daniela Montoya |
| MF | 8 | Marcela Restrepo | | (substituted on) 107' |
| MF | 11 | Catalina Usme | | (substituted on) 72' |
| FW | 7 | Manuela Paví | | (substituted on) 86' |
| FW | 15 | Wendy Bonilla | | (substituted on) 107' |
| FW | 23 | Liced Serna | | (substituted on) 90+5' |
Manager:
(Colombia) Ángelo Marsiglia

| GK | 1 | Lorena |
| DF | 3 | Tarciane | (yellow card) 40' |
| DF | 20 | Mariza | (yellow card) 103' |
| DF | 13 | Fe Palermo | | (substituted off) 44' |
| MF | 18 | Gabi Portilho | | (substituted off) 76' |
| MF | 5 | Duda Sampaio | | (substituted off) 81' |
| MF | 8 | Angelina (c) | (yellow card) 118' |
| MF | 6 | Yasmim |
| MF | 7 | Kerolin | | (substituted off) 108' |
| FW | 11 | Gio Garbelini | | (substituted off) 82' |
| FW | 21 | Dudinha | | (substituted off) 44' |
Substitutes:
| GK | 12 | Camila Rodrigues |
| GK | 14 | Cláudia |
| DF | 2 | Antônia |
| DF | 4 | Kaká |
| DF | 16 | Fátima Dutra |
| DF | 23 | Isa Haas | (yellow card) 104' | (substituted on) 44' |
| MF | 15 | Ary Borges |
| MF | 17 | Vitória Yaya | | (substituted on) 81' |
| FW | 9 | Amanda Gutierres | | (substituted on) 44' |
| FW | 10 | Marta | | (substituted on) 82' |
| FW | 19 | Jhonson | | (substituted on) 108' |
| FW | 22 | Luany | | (substituted on) 76' |
Manager:
(Brazil) Arthur Elias

Player of the Match:
Marta (Brazil)

Assistant referees:
Marcia Castillo (Chile)
Leslie Vasquez (Chile)
Fourth official:
Anahí Fernández (Uruguay)
Video assistant referee:
Augusto Alfredo Menendez (Peru)
Assistant video assistant referee:
Wilma Balderrama (Bolivia)
