= Brazil women's national football team results (2020–present) =

- Win Draw Loss

This is a list of the Brazil women's national football team results from 2020 to present.

== Results ==
=== 2020 ===
4 March 2020 2020 Tournoi de France	Netherlands	0–0	Brazil	Valenciennes, France
19:00 CET (UTC+1)		Report		Stadium: Stade du Hainaut; Attendance: 6,199; Referee: Victoria Beyer (France)

7 March 2020 2020 Tournoi de France	France	1–0	Brazil	Valenciennes, France
21:00 CET (UTC+1)	Gauvin 55'	Report		Stadium: Stade du Hainaut; Attendance: 17,022; Referee: Marta Huerta de Aza (Spain)

10 March 2020 2020 Tournoi de France	Brazil	2–2	Canada	Calais, France
19:00 CET (UTC+1)	Marta 8'; Ludmila 18'	Report	Matheson 74'; Beckie 87'	Stadium: Stade de l'Épopée; Attendance: 0 Referee: Stéphanie Frappart (France)

8 April 2020 Friendly	Costa Rica	Cancelled	Brazil	San José, Costa Rica
				Stadium: Estadio Nacional

14 April 2020 Friendly	United States	Cancelled	Brazil	San Jose, United States
19:00 UTC−7		Report		Stadium: Earthquakes Stadium

27 November 2020 Friendly	Brazil	6–0	Ecuador	São Paulo, Brazil
20:30 UTC−3	Debinha 33', 77', 84' (pen.); Valéria 78'; Rafaelle 82'; Duda Santos 87'	Report		Stadium: Neo Química Arena; Attendance: 0 Referee: Charly Wendy Straub Deretti (Brazil)

1 December 2020 Friendly	Brazil	8–0	Ecuador	São Paulo, Brazil
20:30 UTC−3	Debinha 1'; Luana 15'; Andressa Alves 18', 45'; Rafaelle 20', 41'; Júlia Bianchi 71'; Érika 79'	Report		Stadium: Estádio do Morumbi; Attendance: 0 Referee: Edina Alves Batista (Brazil)

=== 2021 ===
18 February 2021 2021 SheBelieves Cup	Brazil	4–1	Argentina	Orlando, United States
16:00 UTC−5	Marta 30' (pen.); Debinha 47'; Adriana 54'; Geyse 84'	Report	Larroquette 60'	Stadium: Exploria Stadium; Attendance: 1,119; Referee: Ekaterina Koroleva (United States

21 February 2021 2021 SheBelieves Cup	United States	2–0	Brazil	Orlando, United States
15:00 UTC−5	Press 11'; Rapinoe 88'	Report		Stadium: Exploria Stadium; Attendance: 4,000; Referee: Melissa Borjas (Honduras)

24 February 2021 2021 SheBelieves Cup	Canada	0–2	Brazil	Orlando, United States
16:00 UTC−5		Report	Debinha 14'; Júlia Bianchi 38'	Stadium: Exploria Stadium; Attendance: 1,409; Referee: Danielle Chesky (United States)

11 June 2021 Friendly	Brazil	3–0	Russia	Cartagena, Spain
21:00 UTC+2	Bruna Benites 42', 64'; Andressa Alves 81'	Report		Stadium: Estadio Cartagonova; Referee: Miriam Matulova (Slovakia)

14 June 2021 Friendly	Brazil	0–0	Canada	Cartagena, Spain
21:00 UTC+2		Report		Stadium: Estadio Cartagonova; Referee: Zuzana Valentova (Slovakia)

21 July 2021 2020 Olympic Games GS	China	0–5	Brazil	Rifu, Japan
17:00 UTC+9		Report	Marta 9', 74'; Debinha 22'; Andressa Alves 82'; Bia Zaneratto 89'	Stadium: Miyagi Stadium; Attendance: 1,645; Referee: Kateryna Monzul (Ukraine)

24 July 2021 2020 Olympic Games GS	Netherlands	3–3	Brazil	Rifu, Japan
20:00 UTC+9	Miedema 3', 59'; Janssen 79'	Report	Debinha 16'; Marta 65' (pen.); Ludmila 68'	Stadium: Miyagi Stadium; Attendance: 2,621; Referee: Kate Jacewicz (Australia)

27 July 2021 2020 Olympic Games GS	Brazil	1–0	Zambia	Saitama, Japan
20:30 UTC+9	Andressa Alves 19'	Report		Stadium: Saitama Stadium 2002; Attendance: 0 Referee: Yoshimi Yamashita (Japan)

30 July 2021 2020 Olympic Games QF	Canada	0–0 (a.e.t.) (4–3 p)	Brazil	Rifu, Japan
17:00 UTC+9		Report		Stadium: Miyagi Stadium; Attendance: 3,403; Referee: Stéphanie Frappart (France)
	Penalties
	Sinclair (penalty missed); Fleming (penalty scored); Lawrence (penalty scored); Leon (penalty scored); Gilles (penalty scored)		(penalty scored) Marta; (penalty scored) Debinha; (penalty scored) Érika; (penalty missed) Andressa Alves

17 September 2021 Friendly	Brazil	3–1	Argentina	João Pessoa, Brazil
14:00 UTC−3	Debinha 38'; Nycole 50'; Angelina 59'	Report	Bonsegundo 73'	Stadium: Almeidão; Referee: Deborah Correia (Brazil)

20 September 2021 Friendly	Brazil	4–1	Argentina	Campina Grande, Brazil
14:00 UTC−3	Kerolin 19'; Marta 37'; Debinha 48'; Yasmim 52'	Report	Larroquette 51'	Stadium: Amigão; Referee: Thayslane Costa (Brazil)

23 October 2021 Friendly	Australia	3–1	Brazil	Sydney, Australia
19:45 UTC+10	Polkinghorne 38'; Fowler 66'; van Egmond 80'	Report	Adriana 68'	Stadium: CommBank Stadium; Attendance: 15,270; Referee: Esther Staubli (Switzerland)

26 October 2021 Friendly	Australia	2–2	Brazil	Sydney, Australia
20:05 UTC+10	Polkinghorne 9'; Kerr 52'	Report	Érika 63'; Debinha 70'	Stadium: CommBank Stadium; Attendance: 12,087; Referee: Désirée Grundbacher (Switzerland)

25 November 2021 2021 Torneio Internacional de Futebol Feminino	Brazil	6–1	India	Manaus, Brazil
21:00 UTC−3	Debinha 1'; Gio 37'; Ary Borges 52', 81'; Kerolin 54'; Geyse 76'	Report	Kalyan 8'	Stadium: Arena da Amazônia; Referee: Daiane Caroline Muniz (Brazil)

28 November 2021 2021 Torneio Internacional de Futebol Feminino	Brazil	4–1	Venezuela	Manaus, Brazil
20:00 UTC−3	Kerolin 20', 40'; Gabi Nunes 25'; Debinha 45+1'	Report	Villamizar 3'	Stadium: Arena da Amazônia; Referee: Charly Wendy Straub Deretti (Brazil)

1 December 2021 2021 Torneio Internacional de Futebol Feminino	Brazil	2–0	Chile	Manaus, Brazil
20:00 UTC−3	Kerolin 50'; Gio 84'	Report		Stadium: Arena da Amazônia; Referee: Edina Alves Batista (Brazil)

=== 2022 ===
16 February 2022 2022 Tournoi de France	Brazil	1–1	Netherlands	Caen, France
19:00 UTC+1	Marta 87' (pen.)	Report	Beerensteyn 62'	Stadium: Stade Michel d'Ornano; Attendance: 1,182; Referee: Stéphanie Frappart (France)

19 February 2022 2022 Tournoi de France	France	2–1	Brazil	Caen, France
21:10 UTC+1	Katoto 23', 59'	Report	Marta 19' (pen.)	Stadium: Stade Michel d'Ornano; Attendance: 12,050; Referee: Esther Staubli (Switzerland)

22 February 2022 2022 Tournoi de France	Brazil	0–0	Finland	Le Havre, France
18:30 UTC+1		Report		Stadium: Stade Océane; Referee: Victoria Beyer (France)

7 April 2022 Friendly	Spain	1–1	Brazil	Alicante, Spain
20:00 UTC+2	Putellas 8'	Report	Geyse 39'	Stadium: Estadio José Rico Pérez; Referee: Rebecca Welch (England)

11 April 2022 Friendly	Brazil	3–1	Hungary	San Pedro del Pinatar, Spain
20:30 UTC+2	Gabi Nunes 14', 63'; Bia Zaneratto 53'	Report	Csiki 75' (pen.)	Stadium: Pinatar Arena; Referee: Ainara Acevedo (Spain)

24 June 2022 Friendly	Denmark	2–1	Brazil	Copenhagen, Denmark
19:00 UTC+2	Thomsen 17'; Gejl 90+1'	Report	Debinha 87'	Stadium: Parken Stadium; Attendance: 21,542; Referee: Henrikke Nervik (Norway)

28 June 2022 Friendly	Sweden	3–1	Brazil	Stockholm, Sweden
18:30 UTC+2	Rytting Kaneryd 65'; Hurtig 67'; Blackstenius 89'	Report	Debinha 50'	Stadium: Friends Arena; Attendance: 33,218; Referee: Sandra Braz (Portugal)

9 July 2022 2022 Copa América Femenina GS	Brazil	4–0	Argentina	Armenia, Colombia
19:00 UTC−5	Adriana 28', 58'; Bia Zaneratto 36' (pen.); Debinha 87'	Report		Stadium: Estadio Centenario; Referee: María Carvajal (Chile)

12 July 2022 2022 Copa América Femenina GS	Uruguay	0–3	Brazil	Armenia, Colombia
16:00 UTC−5		Report	Adriana 32', 48'; Debinha 45+2'	Stadium: Estadio Centenario; Referee: Zulma Quiñónez (Paraguay)

18 July 2022 2022 Copa América Femenina GS	Venezuela	0–4	Brazil	Armenia, Colombia
16:00 UTC−5		Report	Bia Zaneratto 22'; Ary Borges 51'; Debinha 58', 65'	Stadium: Estadio Centenario; Referee: Zulma Quiñónez (Paraguay)

21 July 2022 2022 Copa América Femenina GS	Brazil	6–0	Peru	Cali, Colombia
19:00 UTC−5	Duda Francelino 1'; Duda Sampaio 17'; Geyse 41'; Duda Santos 44' (pen.); Fe Palermo 48'; Adriana 50' (pen.)	Report		Stadium: Estadio Olímpico Pascual Guerrero; Referee: Susana Corella (Ecuador)

26 July 2022 2022 Copa América Femenina SF	Brazil	2–0	Paraguay	Bucaramanga, Colombia
19:00 UTC−5	Ary Borges 16'; Bia Zaneratto 28'	Report		Stadium: Estadio Alfonso López; Referee: Anahí Fernández (Uruguay)

30 July 2022 2022 Copa América Femenina F	Colombia	0–1	Brazil	Bucaramanga, Colombia
19:00 UTC−5		Report	Debinha 39' (pen.)	Stadium: Estadio Alfonso López; Referee: Laura Fortunato (Argentina)

2 September 2022 Friendly	South Africa	0–3	Brazil	Soweto, South Africa
18:00 UTC+2		Report	Geyse 43'; Adriana 45'; Tamires 63'	Stadium: Orlando Stadium; Referee: Maria Rivet (Mauritius)

5 September 2022 Friendly	South Africa	0–6	Brazil	Durban, South Africa
18:00 UTC+2		Report	Adriana 4'; Debinha 44', 81'; Bia Zaneratto 49' (pen.); Duda Francelino 51'; Kathellen 58'	Stadium: Moses Mabhida Stadium; Referee: Tatu Nuru Malogo (Tanzania)

7 October 2022 Friendly	Norway	1–4	Brazil	Oslo, Norway
19:00 UTC+2	Ildhusøy 50'	Report	Adriana 43'; Bia Zaneratto 47', 52'; Jaqueline 73'	Stadium: Ullevaal Stadium; Referee: Lina Lehtovaara (Finland)

10 October 2022 Friendly	Italy	0–1	Brazil	Genoa, Italy
18:30 UTC+2		Report	Adriana 47'	Stadium: Luigi Ferraris Stadium; Referee: Michèle Schmölzer (Switzerland)

11 November 2022 Friendly	Brazil	1–2	Canada	Santos, Brazil
14:15 UTC−3	Debinha 33'	Report	Zadorsky 21'; Leon 28'	Stadium: Vila Belmiro; Attendance: 3,786; Referee: Gabriela Coronel (Argentina)

15 November 2022 Friendly	Brazil	2–1	Canada	São Paulo, Brazil
14:15 UTC−3	Bia Zaneratto 41'; Ana Vitória 90+1'	Report	Lawrence 60' (pen.)	Stadium: Neo Química Arena; Attendance: 19,585; Referee: Laura Fortunato (Argentina)

=== 2023 ===
16 February 2023 2023 SheBelieves Cup	Japan	0–1	Brazil	Orlando, United States
16:00 UTC−5		Report	Debinha 71'	Stadium: Exploria Stadium; Attendance: 6,453; Referee: Tori Penso (United States)

19 February 2023 2023 SheBelieves Cup	Brazil	0–2	Canada	Nashville, United States
17:30 UTC−6		Report	Gilles 31'; Viens 71'	Stadium: Geodis Park; Attendance: 6,502; Referee: Katja Koroleva (United States)

22 February 2023 2023 SheBelieves Cup	United States	2–1	Brazil	Frisco, United States
18:00 UTC−6	Morgan 45+2'; Swanson 63'	Report	Ludmila 90'	Stadium: Toyota Stadium; Attendance: 17,784; Referee: Marie-Soleil Beaudoin (Canada)

6 April 2023 2023 UEFA–CONMEBOL Women's Finalissima	England	1–1 (4–2 p)	Brazil	London, England
19:45 BST (UTC+1)	Toone 23'	Report	Andressa Alves 90+3'	Stadium: Wembley Stadium; Attendance: 83,132; Referee: Stéphanie Frappart (France)
	Penalties
	Stanway (penalty scored); Toone (penalty missed); Daly (penalty scored); Greenwood (penalty scored); Kelly (penalty scored)		(penalty scored) Adriana; (penalty missed) Tamires; (penalty missed) Rafaelle; (penalty scored) Kerolin

11 April 2023 Friendly	Germany	1–2	Brazil	Nuremberg, Germany
18:00 CEST (UTC+2)	Brand 90+2'	Report	Tamires 11'; Ary Borges 38'	Stadium: Max-Morlock-Stadion; Attendance: 32,857; Referee: Esther Staubli (Switzerland)

2 July 2023 Friendly	Brazil	4–0	Chile	Brasília, Brazil
10:30 BRT (UTC–3)	Gabi Nunes 4'; Duda Sampaio 28'; Luana 34'; Geyse 49'	Report		Stadium: Estádio Nacional Mané Garrincha; Attendance: 15,892; Referee: Anahi Fernandez (Uruguay)

24 July 2023 2023 FIFA Women's World Cup GS	Brazil	4–0	Panama	Adelaide, Australia
20:30 UTC+9:30	Ary Borges 19', 39', 70'; Bia Zaneratto 48'	Report		Stadium: Hindmarsh Stadium; Attendance: 13,142; Referee: Cheryl Foster (Wales)

29 July 2023 2023 FIFA Women's World Cup GS	France	2–1	Brazil	Brisbane, Australia
20:00 UTC+10	Le Sommer 17'; Renard 83'	Report	Debinha 58'	Stadium: Lang Park; Attendance: 49,378; Referee: Kate Jacewicz (Australia)

2 August 2023 2023 FIFA Women's World Cup GS	Jamaica	0–0	Brazil	Melbourne, Australia
20:00 UTC+10		Report		Stadium: Melbourne Rectangular Stadium; Attendance: 27,638; Referee: Esther Staubli (Switzerland)

28 October 2023 Friendly	Canada	0–1	Brazil	Montréal, Canada
14:30 UTC−4		Report	Debinha 90+4'	Stadium: Stade Saputo; Referee: Natalie Simon (United States)

31 October 2023 Friendly	Canada	2–0	Brazil	Halifax, Canada
19:30 UTC−3	Huitema 69'; Rose 89'	Report		Stadium: Wanderers Grounds; Referee: Alex Billeter (United States)

30 November 2023 Friendly	Brazil	4–3	Japan	São Paulo, Brazil
15:15 BRT (UTC–3)	Bia Zaneratto 41', 63'; Gabi Portilho 61'; Priscila 90+7'	Report	Fujino 38'; Endō 86' (pen.); Mi. Tanaka 88'	Stadium: Arena Corinthians; Referee: María Victoria Daza Ortíz (Colombia)

3 December 2023 Friendly	Brazil	0–2	Japan	São Paulo, Brazil
11:00 BRT (UTC–3)		Report	Minami 17'; Mi. Tanaka 19'	Stadium: Estádio do Morumbi; Referee: Jenny Arias Parga (Colombia)

6 December 2023 Friendly	Brazil	4–0	Nicaragua	Araraquara, Brazil
17:00 BRT (UTC–3)	Gabi Nunes 16'; Marta 40'; Luana 64'; Aline Milene 68'	Report		Stadium: Fonte Luminosa; Referee: María Victoria Daza Ortíz (Colombia)

=== 2024 ===
21 February 2024 2024 CONCACAF W Gold Cup GS	Brazil	1–0	Puerto Rico	San Diego, United States
19:15 UTC−8	Gabi Nunes 81'	Report		Stadium: Snapdragon Stadium; Referee: Natalie Simon (United States)

24 February 2024 2024 CONCACAF W Gold Cup GS	Colombia	0–1	Brazil	San Diego, United States
19:15 UTC−8		Report	Duda Santos 6'	Stadium: Snapdragon Stadium; Referee: Tori Penso (United States)

27 February 2024 2024 CONCACAF W Gold Cup GS	Brazil	5–0	Panama	San Diego, United States
19:15 UTC−8	Geyse 4', 74'; Bia Menezes 10'; Rafaelle 23'; Debinha 51'	Report		Stadium: Snapdragon Stadium; Referee: Myriam Marcotte (Canada)

2 March 2024 2024 CONCACAF W Gold Cup QF	Brazil	5–1	Argentina	Los Angeles, United States
19:15 UTC−8	Yaya 19'; Yasmim 36'; Bia Zaneratto 54', 90+5'; Gabi Nunes 62'	Report	Dos Santos 82'	Stadium: BMO Stadium; Referee: Myriam Marcotte (Canada)

6 March 2024 2024 CONCACAF W Gold Cup SF	Brazil	3–0	Mexico	San Diego, United States
16:00 UTC−8	Adriana 21'; Antônia 32'; Yasmim 48'	Report		Stadium: Snapdragon Stadium; Referee: Tori Penso (United States)

10 March 2024 2024 CONCACAF W Gold Cup F	United States	1–0	Brazil	San Diego, United States
17:15 UTC−8	Horan 45+1'	Report		Stadium: Snapdragon Stadium; Attendance: 31,528; Referee: Melissa Borjas (Honduras)

6 April 2024 2024 SheBelieves Cup SF	Brazil	1–1 (2–4 p)	Canada	Atlanta, United States
15:30 UTC−4	Tarciane 22' (pen.)	Report	Gilles 76'	Stadium: Mercedes-Benz Stadium; Attendance: 50,644; Referee: Tori Penso (United States)
	Penalties
	Marta (penalty missed); Cristiane (penalty scored); Antônia (penalty missed); Tarciane (penalty scored)		(penalty missed) Lawrence; (penalty scored) Leon; (penalty scored) J. Rose; (penalty scored) Awujo; (penalty scored) Grosso

9 April 2024 2024 SheBelieves Cup 3rd	Japan	1–1 (0–3 p)	Brazil	Columbus, United States
16:00 UTC−4	Tanaka 35'	Report	Cristiane 71'	Stadium: Lower.com Field; Attendance: 12,001; Referee: Danielle Chesky (United States)
	Penalties
	Seike (penalty missed); Nagano (penalty missed); Hasegawa (penalty missed)		(penalty scored) Cristiane; (penalty scored) Tarciane; (penalty scored) Angelina

1 June 2024 Friendly	Brazil	4–0	Jamaica	São Lourenço da Mata, Brazil
17:00 BRT (UTC–3)	Adriana 26'; Swaby 38' (o.g.); Marta 64', 90'	Report		Stadium: Arena Pernambuco; Attendance: 27,031; Referee: Zulma Quñonez (Paraguay)

4 June 2024 Friendly	Brazil	4–0	Jamaica	Salvador, Brazil
20:00 BRT (UTC–3)	Debinha 7'; Jheniffer 64', 79'; Marta 84'	Report		Stadium: Arena Fonte Nova; Attendance: 31,537; Referee: Emikar Calderas (Venezuela)

25 July 2024 2024 Olympic Games GS	Nigeria	0–1	Brazil	Bordeaux, France
19:00 CEST (UTC+2)		Report	Gabi Nunes 37'	Stadium: Stade de Bordeaux; Attendance: 6,244; Referee: Kim Yu-jeong (South Korea)

28 July 2024 2024 Olympic Games GS	Brazil	1–2	Japan	Paris, France
17:00 CEST (UTC+2)	Jheniffer 56'	Report	Kumagai 90+2' (pen.); Tanikawa 90+6'	Stadium: Parc de Princes; Attendance: 40,918; Referee: Rebecca Welch (Great Britain)

31 July 2024 2024 Olympic Games GS	Brazil	0–2	Spain	Bordeaux, France
17:00 CEST (UTC+2)		Report	Del Castillo 68'; Putellas 90+17'	Stadium: Stade de Bordeaux; Attendance: 14,497; Referee: Espen Eskås (Norway)

3 August 2024 2024 Olympic Games QF	France	0–1	Brazil	Nantes, France
21:00 CEST (UTC+2)		Report	Gabi Portilho 82'	Stadium: Stade de la Beaujoire; Attendance: 32,280; Referee: Tori Penso (United States)

6 August 2024 2024 Olympic Games SF	Brazil	4–2	Spain	Marseille, France
21:00 CEST (UTC+2)	Paredes 6' (o.g.); Gabi Portilho 45+4'; Adriana 72'; Kerolin 90+1'	Report	Paralluelo 85', 90+12'	Stadium: Stade de Marseille; Attendance: 14,201; Referee: Rebecca Welch (Great Britain)

10 August 2024 2024 Olympic Games Gold	Brazil	0–1	United States	Paris, France
17:00 CEST (UTC+2)		Report	Swanson 57'	Stadium: Parc des Princes; Attendance: 43,813; Referee: Tess Olofsson (Sweden)

26 October 2024 Friendly	Brazil	1–1	Colombia	Cariacica, Brazil
18:30 BRT (UTC–3)	Tarciane 75'	Report	Usme 6'	Stadium: Estádio Kléber Andrade; Attendance: 10,564; Referee: Dione Rissios (Chile)

29 October 2024 Friendly	Brazil	3–1	Colombia	Cariacica, Brazil
19:00 BRT (UTC–3)	Isa Haas 28'; Gio 45+2'; Adriana 83' (pen.)	Report	Caicedo 69'	Stadium: Estádio Kléber Andrade; Referee: Dione Rissios (Chile)

28 November 2024 Friendly	Australia	1–3	Brazil	Brisbane, Australia
20:00 UTC+10	Foord 43'	Report	Amanda Gutierres 6', 13'; Gio 54'	Stadium: Suncorp Stadium; Attendance: 47,501; Referee: Oh Hyeon-jeong (South Korea)

1 December 2024 Friendly	Australia	1–2	Brazil	Gold Coast, Australia
18:45 UTC+10	Raso 42'	Report	Gabi Portilho 29'; Lauren 40'	Stadium: Cbus Super Stadium; Attendance: 25,297; Referee: Oh Hyeon-jeong (South Korea)

=== 2025 ===
5 April 2025 Friendly	United States	2–0	Brazil	Inglewood, United States
14:00 UTC−7	Rodman 5'; Heaps 66' (pen.)	Report		Stadium: SoFi Stadium; Attendance: 32,303; Referee: Katia García (Mexico)

8 April 2025 Friendly	United States	1–2	Brazil	San Jose, United States
19:30 UTC−7	Macario 1'	Report	Kerolin 24'; Amanda Gutierres 90+5'	Stadium: PayPal Park; Attendance: 19,049; Referee: Marianela Araya (Costa Rica)

30 May 2025 Friendly	Brazil	3–1	Japan	São Paulo, Brazil
21:30 UTC−3	Dudinha 28', 42'; Kerolin 55'	Report	Seike 89'	Stadium: Neo Química Arena; Attendance: 33,325; Referee: Roberta Echeverría (Argentina)

2 June 2025 Friendly	Brazil	2–1	Japan	Bragança Paulista, Brazil
20:00 UTC−3	Ishikawa 54' (o.g.); Jhonson 79'	Report	Seike 46'	Stadium: Estádio Cícero de Souza Marques; Attendance: 8,412; Referee: Maria Laura Fortunato (Argentina)

27 June 2025 Friendly	France	3–2	Brazil	Grenoble, France
21:10 UTC+2	Geyoro 45', 56'; Katoto 76'	Report	Luany 7'; Kerolin 12'	Stadium: Stade des Alpes; Attendance: 13,100; Referee: Ewa Augustyn (Poland)

13 July 2025 2025 Copa América Femenina GS	Brazil	2–0	Venezuela	Quito, Ecuador
19:00 UTC−5	Amanda Gutierres 32'; Duda Sampaio 88'	Report		Stadium: Estadio Gonzalo Pozo Ripalda; Referee: Milagros Arruela (Peru)

16 July 2025 2025 Copa América Femenina GS	Bolivia	0–6	Brazil	Quito, Ecuador
16:00 UTC−5		Report	Luany 13', 32'; Kerolin 37' (pen.), 79', 83'; Amanda Gutierres 90+5'	Stadium: Estadio Gonzalo Pozo Ripalda; Referee: Roberta Echeverría (Argentina)

22 July 2025 2025 Copa América Femenina GS	Paraguay	1–4	Brazil	Quito, Ecuador
19:00 UTC−5	C. Martínez 65'	Report	Yasmim 27', 39'; Amanda Gutierres 60'; Duda Sampaio 75'	Stadium: Estadio Gonzalo Pozo Ripalda; Referee: Dione Rissios (Chile)

25 July 2025 2025 Copa América Femenina GS	Brazil	0–0	Colombia	Quito, Ecuador
19:00 UTC−5		Report		Stadium: Estadio Gonzalo Pozo Ripalda; Referee: Milagros Arruela (Peru)

29 July 2025 2025 Copa América Femenina SF	Brazil	5–1	Uruguay	Quito, Ecuador
19:00 UTC−5	Amanda Gutierres 11', 65'; Gio 13'; Marta 27' (pen.); Dudinha 86'	Report	Isa Haas 51' (o.g.)	Stadium: Estadio Rodrigo Paz Delgado; Referee: Zulma Quiñónez (Paraguay)

2 August 2025 2025 Copa América Femenina F	Colombia	4–4 (a.e.t.) (4–5 p)	Brazil	Quito, Ecuador
16:00 UTC−5	Caicedo 25'; Tarciane 69' (o.g.); Ramírez 88'; Santos 115'	Report	Angelina 45+9' (pen.); Amanda Gutierres 80'; Marta 90+6', 105'	Stadium: Estadio Rodrigo Paz Delgado; Referee: Dione Rissios (Chile)
	Penalties
	Usme (penalty scored); Restrepo (penalty scored); Paví (penalty missed); Santos (penalty missed); Caicedo (penalty scored); Bonilla (penalty scored); Carabalí (penalty missed)		(penalty scored) Tarciane; (penalty missed) Angelina; (penalty scored) Amanda Gutierres; (penalty scored) Mariza; (penalty missed) Marta; (penalty scored) Jhonson; (penalty scored) Luany

25 October 2025 Friendly	England	1–2	Brazil	Manchester, England
17:30 BST (UTC+1)	Stanway 52' (pen.)	Report	Bia Zaneratto 9'; Dudinha 18'	Stadium: City of Manchester Stadium; Attendance: 37,460; Referee: Natalie Simon (United States)

28 October 2025 Friendly	Italy	0–1	Brazil	Parma, Italy
18:15 CET (UTC+1)		Report	Luany 68'	Stadium: Stadio Ennio Tardini; Attendance: 3,800; Referee: Amina Gutschi (Austria)

28 November 2025 Friendly	Norway	3–1	Brazil	La Línea, Spain
19:00 CET (UTC+1)	Gaupset 11', 53'; Stølen Godø 69' (pen.)	Report	Mariza 44'	Stadium: Estadio Municipal de La Línea; Attendance: 374; Referee: Frederikke Lydia Søkjær (Denmark)

2 December 2025 Friendly	Portugal	0–5	Brazil	Aveiro, Portugal
19:45 WET (UTC+0)		Report	Gabi Zanotti 1'; Ludmila 16'; Dudinha 37'; Isabela 73'; Bia Zaneratto 90' (pen.)	Stadium: Estádio Municipal de Aveiro; Attendance: 15,323; Referee: Riem Hussein (Germany)

=== 2026 ===
27 February 2026 Friendly	Costa Rica	2–5	Brazil	Alajuela, Costa Rica
19:00 UTC−6	Chinchilla 52', 67'	Report	Kerolin 11'; Jheniffer 14'; Taina Maranhão 28', 90+2'; Adriana 81' (pen.)	Stadium: Estadio Alejandro Morera Soto; Referee: Félix Mojica (Nicaragua)

3 March 2026 Friendly	Brazil	1–2	Venezuela	Toluca, Mexico
15:00 UTC−6	Jaqueline 89'	Report	Romero 45'; Higuera 49'	Stadium: FMF Asociación; Referee: Francia González (Mexico)

7 March 2026 Friendly	Mexico	1–0	Brazil	Mexico City, Mexico
17:00 UTC−6	Espinoza 76'	Report		Stadium: Estadio Ciudad de los Deportes; Attendance: 24,876; Referee: Carly Shaw-MacLaren (Canada)

11 April 2026 2026 FIFA Series	Brazil	5–1	South Korea	Cuiabá, Brazil
21:30 UTC−4	Ary Borges 42'; Ludmila 47'; Dudinha 58'; Kerolin 61'; Taina Maranhão 83'	Report	Park Soo-jeong 87'	Stadium: Arena Pantanal; Referee: Laura Fortunato (Argentina)

14 April 2026 2026 FIFA Series	Brazil	6–1	Zambia	Cuiabá, Brazil
21:30 UTC−4	Yasmim 30'; Taina Maranhão 47'; Angelina 60' (pen.); Raíssa Bahia 77'; Kerolin 90+1'; Vitória Calhau 90+6'	Report	Banda 51'	Stadium: Arena Pantanal; Referee: Emikar Calderas (Venezuela)

18 April 2026 2026 FIFA Series	Brazil	1–0	Canada	Cuiabá, Brazil
21:30 UTC−4	Aline Gomes 47'	Report		Stadium: Arena Pantanal; Referee: María Victoria Daza (Colombia)

6 June 2026 Friendly	Brazil	2–1	United States	São Paulo, Brazil
18:30 UTC−3	Taina Maranhão 11'; Bia Zaneratto 14'	Report	Wilson 2'	Stadium: Neo Química Arena; Attendance: 31,336; Referee: María Eugenia Gil Soriano (Spain)

9 June 2026 Friendly	Brazil	0–1	United States	Fortaleza, Brazil
21:30 UTC−3		Report	Isabela 63' (o.g.)	Stadium: Arena Castelão; Attendance: 55,144; Referee: Paola Cebollada López (Spain)

10 October 2026 Friendly	Brazil	3–1	Argentina	Porto Alegre, Brazil
16:30 UTC−3	Luany 27'; Geyse 39'; Angelina 45+1'	Report	Pereyra 51'	Stadium: Estádio Beira-Rio; Attendance: 28,386; Referee: Erika Monserrat González Nevarez (Mexico)

13 October 2026 Friendly	Brazil	2–2	Argentina	São Lourenço da Mata, Brazil
20:30 UTC−3	Bia Zaneratto 13'; Gio 28'	Report	Falfán 35'; Bonsegundo 55' (pen.)	Stadium: Arena Pernambuco; Attendance: 29,444; Referee: Erika Monserrat González Nevarez (Mexico)

29 November 2026 Friendly	Japan	v	Brazil	Hiroshima, Japan
		Report		Stadium: Edion Peace Wing Hiroshima

5 December 2026 Friendly	Japan	v	Brazil	Okayama, Japan
		Report		Stadium: JFE Harenokuni Stadium
