= 2025 Copa América Femenina =

10th edition of the CONMEBOL Copa América women's tournament

Tournament details
- Host country: Ecuador
- Dates: 11 July – 2 August
- Teams: 10 (from 1 confederation)
- Venues: 3 (in 1 host city)

Final positions
- Champions: Brazil (9th title)
- Runners-up: Colombia
- Third place: Argentina
- Fourth place: Uruguay

Tournament statistics
- Matches played: 25
- Goals scored: 85 (3.4 per match)
- Top scorer(s): (Brazil) Amanda Gutierres (Paraguay) Claudia Martínez (6 goals each)
- Best player: (Brazil) Marta
- Best goalkeeper: (Colombia) Katherine Tapia
- Fair play award: Argentina

The 2025 Copa América Femenina was the 10th edition of the main international women's football championship in South America, the Copa América Femenina, for national teams affiliated with CONMEBOL. The competition was held in Ecuador from 11 July to 2 August 2025. The tournament was originally scheduled to begin on 12 July 2025, but CONMEBOL announced on 3 July 2025 that the first match would be played on 11 July 2025.

In the final, Brazil defeated Colombia in a penalty shoot-out after a 4–4 draw in extra time to win their fifth consecutive and a record-extending ninth overall title.

Unlike all previous editions, the tournament did not act as South American qualification for the 2027 FIFA Women's World Cup with a separate qualifying tournament called the Women's Nations League being organised instead. However, it did provide two slots (and later on, an intercontinental play-off spot) for the 2028 Summer Olympics women's football tournament. In addition to Peru (who qualified automatically as hosts) it also provided three more places for the 2027 Pan American Games tournament.

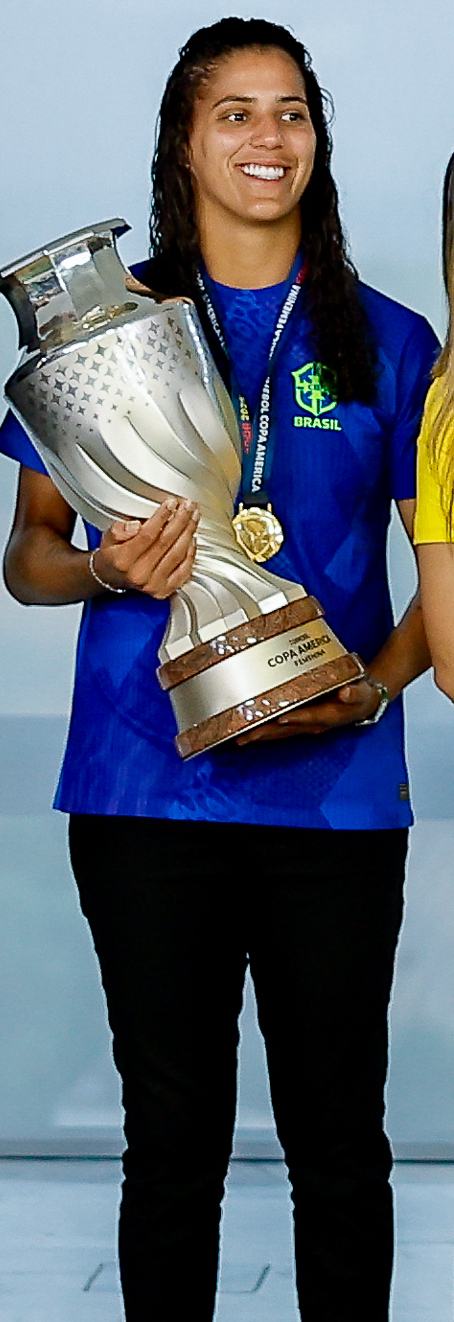
Brazil’s forward Amanda Gutierres with the winners trophy and medal of the 2025 Copa América Femenina

== Teams ==
All ten CONMEBOL women's national teams participated.

Team	Appearance	Previous best performance	FIFA ranking at start of event
Argentina	9th	Champions (2006)	32
Bolivia	9th	Fifth place (1995)	105
Brazil (holders)	10th	Champions (1991, 1995, 1998, 2003, 2010, 2014, 2018, 2022)	4
Chile	10th	Runners-up (1991, 2018)	39
Colombia	8th	Runners-up (2010, 2014, 2022)	18
Ecuador (hosts)	9th	Third place (2014)	67
Paraguay	8th	Fourth place (2006, 2022)	45
Peru	8th	Third place (1998)	77
Uruguay	8th	Third place (2006)	63
Venezuela	9th	Third place (1991)	48

== Venues ==
The venues were announced on 5 May 2025. The matches were played in three stadiums in a city in Ecuador: Quito.

For commercial reasons, Estadio Banco Guayaquil changed its name during the tournament.

Quito			Location of Quito.
Estadio IDV (Estadio Banco Guayaquil)	Estadio Gonzalo Pozo Ripalda	Estadio Rodrigo Paz Delgado	Location of Quito.
Capacity: 12,000	Capacity: 18,779	Capacity: 41,575	Location of Quito.

== Draw ==
The tournament draw was held on 19 December 2024, 13:30 local time (UTC−3), in Asunción, Paraguay.

Seeds	Pot 1	Pot 2	Pot 3	Pot 4
Ecuador (Group A); Brazil (Group B)	Colombia; Argentina	Paraguay; Chile	Venezuela; Uruguay	Bolivia; Peru

== Match officials ==
On 14 June 2025, CONMEBOL announced the list of match officials for the tournament.

Referees

- (Argentina) Roberta Echeverría
- (Bolivia) Adriana Farfán
- (Brazil) Daiane Muniz
- (Chile) Dione Rissios
- (Colombia) María Victoria Daza
- (Ecuador) Marcelly Zambrano
- (North Macedonia) Ivana Projkovska
- (Paraguay) Zulma Quiñónez
- (Peru) Milagros Arruela
- (Uruguay) Anahí Fernández
- (Venezuela) Emikar Calderas

Assistant referees

- (Argentina) Daiana Milone
- (Argentina) Gisela Trucco
- (Bolivia) Elizabeth Blanco
- (Bolivia) Maricela Urapuca
- (Brazil) Maíra Mastella
- (Brazil) Leila Moreira
- (Chile) Marcia Castillo
- (Chile) Leslie Vásquez
- (Colombia) Mary Blanco
- (Colombia) Mayra Sánchez
- (Ecuador) Mónica Amboya
- (Ecuador) Viviana Segura
- (Italy) Giulia Tempestilli
- (Paraguay) Nancy Fernández
- (Paraguay) Nadia Weiler
- (Peru) Mariana Aquino
- (Peru) Vera Yupanqui
- (Spain) Iragartze Fernández
- (Uruguay) Belén Clavijo
- (Uruguay) Daiana Fernández
- (Venezuela) Francis García
- (Venezuela) Migdalia Rodríguez

== Group stage ==
The top two teams of each group advanced to the semi-finals, while the two third-placed teams advanced to the fifth place match.

All times are local, ECT (UTC−5).

=== Tiebreakers ===
In the first stage, the teams were ranked according to points (3 points for a win, 1 point for a draw, 0 points for a loss). If tied on points, tiebreakers were applied in the following order:

1. Points obtained in the matches played between the teams in question;
2. Goal difference in the matches played between the teams in question;
3. Number of goals scored in the matches played between the teams in question;
4. Goal difference in all group matches;
5. Number of goals scored in all group matches;
6. Fewest red cards;
7. Fewest yellow cards;
8. Drawing of lots.

=== Group A ===
Pos	Team	Pld	W	D	L	GF	GA	GD	Pts	Qualification
1	Argentina	4	4	0	0	6	1	+5	12	Advance to semi-finals
2	Uruguay	4	2	1	1	6	3	+3	7	Advance to semi-finals
3	Chile	4	2	0	2	6	6	0	6	Advance to fifth place match
4	Ecuador (H)	4	1	1	2	6	7	−1	4	
5	Peru	4	0	0	4	1	8	−7	0	

Source: CONMEBOL
Rules for classification: Group stage tiebreakers
(H) Hosts
11 July 2025
19:00

Ecuador	2–2	Uruguay
Correa 72' (o.g.); Arias 78'	Report (WEB) Report (CONMEBOL)	Aquino 11'; Pa. González 53' (pen.)

Estadio Banco Guayaquil, Quito
Referee: Daiane Muniz (Brazil)
12 July 2025
16:00

Peru	0–3	Chile
	Report (WEB) Report (CONMEBOL)	Cabezas 62'; Keefe 82'; Valencia 90+4'

Estadio Banco Guayaquil, Quito
Referee: Emikar Calderas (Venezuela)

15 July 2025
16:00

Uruguay	0–1	Argentina
	Report (WEB) Report (CONMEBOL)	Bonsegundo 76'

Estadio Banco Guayaquil, Quito
Referee: Zulma Quiñónez (Paraguay)
15 July 2025
19:00

Peru	1–3	Ecuador
Bilcape 69'	Report (WEB) Report (CONMEBOL)	Arias 16'; Bolaños 42' (pen.); Moreira 90+7'

Estadio Banco Guayaquil, Quito
Referee: Ivana Projkovska (North Macedonia)

18 July 2025
16:00

Uruguay	1–0	Peru
Aquino 64'	Report (WEB) Report (CONMEBOL)

Estadio Banco Guayaquil, Quito
Referee: Adriana Farfán (Bolivia)
18 July 2025
19:00

Argentina	2–1	Chile
Falfán 75'; Cometti 90'	Report (WEB) Report (CONMEBOL)	Pardo 11'

Estadio Banco Guayaquil, Quito
Referee: María Victoria Daza (Colombia)

21 July 2025
16:00

Argentina	1–0	Peru
Rodríguez 88'	Report (WEB) Report (CONMEBOL)

Estadio Banco Guayaquil, Quito
Referee: Daiane Muniz (Brazil)
21 July 2025
19:00

Chile	2–1	Ecuador
Keefe 35'; N. López 45+5'	Report (WEB) Report (CONMEBOL)	Bolaños 24' (pen.)

Estadio Banco Guayaquil, Quito
Referee: Zulma Quiñónez (Paraguay)

24 July 2025
19:00

Ecuador	0–2	Argentina
	Report (WEB) Report (CONMEBOL)	Núñez 19'; Bonsegundo 70'

Estadio Banco Guayaquil, Quito
Referee: Adriana Farfán (Bolivia)
24 July 2025
19:00

Chile	0–3	Uruguay
	Report (WEB) Report (CONMEBOL)	Pa. González 40' (pen.); Carballo 65', 73'

Estadio Gonzalo Pozo Ripalda, Quito
Referee: Ivana Projkovska (North Macedonia)

=== Group B ===
Pos	Team	Pld	W	D	L	GF	GA	GD	Pts	Qualification
1	Brazil	4	3	1	0	12	1	+11	10	Advance to semi-finals
2	Colombia	4	2	2	0	12	1	+11	8	Advance to semi-finals
3	Paraguay	4	2	0	2	8	9	−1	6	Advance to fifth place match
4	Venezuela	4	1	1	2	8	5	+3	4	
5	Bolivia	4	0	0	4	1	25	−24	0	

Source: CONMEBOL
Rules for classification: Group stage tiebreakers
13 July 2025
16:00

Bolivia	0–4	Paraguay
	Report (WEB) Report (CONMEBOL)	C. Martínez 23', 40', 61'; Chamorro 90+3'

Estadio Gonzalo Pozo Ripalda, Quito
Referee: Marcelly Zambrano (Ecuador)
13 July 2025
19:00

Brazil	2–0	Venezuela
Amanda Gutierres 32'; Duda Sampaio 88'	Report (WEB) Report (CONMEBOL)

Estadio Gonzalo Pozo Ripalda, Quito
Referee: Milagros Arruela (Peru)

16 July 2025
16:00

Bolivia	0–6	Brazil
	Report (WEB) Report (CONMEBOL)	Luany 13', 32'; Kerolin 37' (pen.), 79', 83'; Amanda Gutierres 90+5'

Estadio Gonzalo Pozo Ripalda, Quito
Referee: Roberta Echeverría (Argentina)
16 July 2025
19:00

Venezuela	0–0	Colombia
	Report (WEB) Report (CONMEBOL)

Estadio Gonzalo Pozo Ripalda, Quito
Referee: Dione Rissios (Chile)

19 July 2025
16:00

Venezuela	7–1	Bolivia
Altuve 13', 58', 61'; García 24'; Guarecuco 29'; Chirinos 48'; Carrasco 69'	Report (WEB) Report (CONMEBOL)	Doerksen 18'

Estadio Gonzalo Pozo Ripalda, Quito
Referee: Ivana Projkovska (North Macedonia)
19 July 2025
19:00

Colombia	4–1	Paraguay
Caicedo 13', 83'; Ramírez 57'; Santos 90+4'	Report (WEB) Report (CONMEBOL)	C. Martínez 15'

Estadio Gonzalo Pozo Ripalda, Quito
Referee: Anahí Fernández (Uruguay)

22 July 2025
16:00

Colombia	8–0	Bolivia
Montoya 9', 33'; Ramírez 13'; A. Flores 37' (o.g.); Caicedo 43'; Bonilla 56'; Carabalí 70'; Loboa 90+3'	Report (WEB) Report (CONMEBOL)

Estadio Gonzalo Pozo Ripalda, Quito
Referee: Marcelly Zambrano (Ecuador)
22 July 2025
19:00

Paraguay	1–4	Brazil
C. Martínez 65'	Report (WEB) Report (CONMEBOL)	Yasmim 27', 39'; Amanda Gutierres 60'; Duda Sampaio 75'

Estadio Gonzalo Pozo Ripalda, Quito
Referee: Dione Rissios (Chile)

25 July 2025
19:00

Brazil	0–0	Colombia
	Report (WEB) Report (CONMEBOL)

Estadio Banco Guayaquil, Quito
Referee: Milagros Arruela (Peru)
25 July 2025
19:00

Paraguay	2–1	Venezuela
Acosta 64'; C. Martínez 84'	Report (WEB) Report (CONMEBOL)	Altuve 40'

Estadio Gonzalo Pozo Ripalda, Quito
Referee: Anahí Fernández (Uruguay)

== Knockout stage ==
In the knockout phase, if the fifth-place play-off, semi-finals and third-place play-off were level at the end of 90 minutes of normal playing time, no extra time would be played and the match would be decided by a direct penalty shoot-out. If the final was level at the end of the normal playing time, extra time would be played (two periods of 15 minutes each), where each team would be allowed to make an extra substitution. If still tied after extra time, the final would be decided by a penalty shoot-out to determine the champions.

=== Bracket ===
Semi-finals
28 July – Quito (RPD)
Argentina	0 (4)
Colombia (p)	0 (5)
29 July – Quito (RPD)
Brazil	5
Uruguay	1

Final
2 August – Quito (RPD)
Colombia	4 (4)
Brazil (p)	4 (5)

Fifth place match
28 July – Quito (IDV)
Chile	0
Paraguay	1

Third place match
1 August – Quito (RPD)
Argentina (p)	2 (5)
Uruguay	2 (4)

=== Fifth place match ===
The winners of the fifth place match qualified for the 2027 Pan American Games.

28 July 2025
16:00

Chile	0–1	Paraguay
	Report (WEB) Report (CONMEBOL)	Arrieta 90+2'

Estadio Banco Guayaquil, Quito
Referee: Emikar Calderas (Venezuela)

=== Semi-finals ===
The winners of the semi-finals qualified for the football tournament at the 2028 Summer Olympics. The losers qualified for the 2027 Pan American Games.

28 July 2025
19:00

Argentina	0–0	Colombia
	Report (WEB) Report (CONMEBOL)
Penalties
Bonsegundo (penalty scored); Braun (penalty scored); Gramaglia (penalty missed); Cometti (penalty scored); Núñez (penalty scored); Stábile (penalty missed)	4–5	(penalty scored) Usme; (penalty scored) Carabalí; (penalty scored) Paví; (penalty missed) Ramírez; (penalty scored) Caicedo; (penalty scored) Bonilla

Estadio Rodrigo Paz Delgado, Quito
Referee: Ivana Projkovska (North Macedonia)

29 July 2025
19:00

Brazil	5–1	Uruguay
Amanda Gutierres 11', 65'; Gio Garbelini 13'; Marta 27' (pen.); Dudinha 86'	Report (WEB) Report (CONMEBOL)	Isa Haas 51' (o.g.)

Estadio Rodrigo Paz Delgado, Quito
Referee: Zulma Quiñónez (Paraguay)

=== Third place match ===
The winner eventually advanced to the AFC–CONMEBOL play-off match for the football tournament at the 2028 Summer Olympics.

1 August 2025
19:00

Argentina	2–2	Uruguay
Cometti 24'; Bonsegundo 83' (pen.)	Report (WEB) Report (CONMEBOL)	Pizarro 35'; Viera 45'
Penalties
Bonsegundo (penalty scored); Braun (penalty scored); Roggerone (penalty scored); Cometti (penalty scored); Núñez (penalty scored)	5–4	(penalty scored) Pa. González; (penalty missed) Lacoste; (penalty scored) Ramírez; (penalty scored) Olivera; (penalty scored) Pizarro

Estadio Rodrigo Paz Delgado, Quito
Referee: Emikar Calderas (Venezuela)

=== Final ===
2 August 2025
16:00

Colombia	4–4 (a.e.t.)	Brazil
Caicedo 25'; Tarciane 69' (o.g.); Ramírez 88'; Santos 115'	Report (WEB) Report (CONMEBOL)	Angelina 45+9' (pen.); Amanda Gutierres 80'; Marta 90+6', 105'
Penalties
Usme (penalty scored); Restrepo (penalty scored); Paví (penalty missed); Santos (penalty missed); Caicedo (penalty scored); Bonilla (penalty scored); Carabalí (penalty missed)	4–5	(penalty scored) Tarciane; (penalty missed) Angelina; (penalty scored) Amanda Gutierres; (penalty scored) Mariza; (penalty missed) Marta; (penalty scored) Jhonson; (penalty scored) Luany

Estadio Rodrigo Paz Delgado, Quito
Referee: Dione Rissios (Chile)

== Statistics ==
=== Goalscorers ===
There were 85 goals scored in 25 matches, for an average of 3.4 goals per match.

6 goals

- (Brazil) Amanda Gutierres
- (Paraguay) Claudia Martínez

4 goals

- (Colombia) Linda Caicedo
- (Venezuela) Oriana Altuve

3 goals

- (Argentina) Florencia Bonsegundo
- (Brazil) Kerolin
- (Brazil) Marta
- (Colombia) Mayra Ramírez

2 goals

- (Argentina) Aldana Cometti
- (Brazil) Duda Sampaio
- (Brazil) Luany
- (Brazil) Yasmim
- (Chile) Sonya Keefe
- (Colombia) Daniela Montoya
- (Colombia) Leicy Santos
- (Ecuador) Emily Arias
- (Ecuador) Nayely Bolaños
- (Uruguay) Belén Aquino
- (Uruguay) Wendy Carballo
- (Uruguay) Pamela González

1 goal

- (Argentina) Daiana Falfán
- (Argentina) Kishi Núñez
- (Argentina) Yamila Rodríguez
- (Bolivia) Emilie Doerksen
- (Brazil) Angelina
- (Brazil) Dudinha
- (Brazil) Gio Garbelini
- (Chile) Pamela Cabezas
- (Chile) Nayadet López
- (Chile) Vaitiare Pardo
- (Chile) Mary Valencia
- (Colombia) Wendy Bonilla
- (Colombia) Jorelyn Carabalí
- (Colombia) Valerin Loboa
- (Ecuador) Ligia Moreira
- (Paraguay) Fátima Acosta
- (Paraguay) Camila Arrieta
- (Paraguay) Lice Chamorro
- (Peru) Raquel Bilcape
- (Uruguay) Esperanza Pizarro
- (Uruguay) Juliana Viera
- (Venezuela) Raiderlin Carrasco
- (Venezuela) Melanie Chirinos
- (Venezuela) Gabriela García
- (Venezuela) Joemar Guarecuco

1 own goal

- (Bolivia) Anabel Flores (against Colombia)
- (Brazil) Isa Haas (against Uruguay)
- (Brazil) Tarciane (against Colombia)
- (Uruguay) Yannel Correa (against Ecuador)

== Awards ==
2025 Copa América Femenina winners

Brazil
9th title

Award	Winner
Golden Ball	(Brazil) Marta
Top scorer	(Paraguay) Claudia Martínez (6 goals) (Brazil) Amanda Gutierres (6 goals)
Golden Glove	(Colombia) Katherine Tapia
Fair Play	Argentina

Best XI
Goalkeeper	Defenders	Midfielders	Forwards
(Colombia) Katherine Tapia	(Brazil) Tarciane; (Argentina) Aldana Cometti; (Uruguay) Stephanie Lacoste	(Colombia) Linda Caicedo; (Brazil) Duda Sampaio; (Argentina) Florencia Bonsegundo; (Brazil) Marta	(Paraguay) Claudia Martínez; (Brazil) Amanda Gutierres; (Colombia) Mayra Ramírez

== Tournament teams ranking ==
This table shows the ranking of teams throughout the tournament.

Pos	Team	Pld	W	D	L	GF	GA	GD	Pts	Final result
1	Brazil	6	4	2	0	21	6	+15	14	Champions
2	Colombia	6	2	4	0	16	5	+11	10	Runners-up
3	Argentina	6	4	2	0	8	3	+5	14	Third place
4	Uruguay	6	2	2	2	9	10	−1	8	Fourth place
5	Paraguay	5	3	0	2	9	9	0	9	Fifth place
6	Chile	5	2	0	3	6	7	−1	6	Sixth place
7	Venezuela	4	1	1	2	8	5	+3	4	Eliminated in group stage
8	Ecuador (H)	4	1	1	2	6	7	−1	4	Eliminated in group stage
9	Peru	4	0	0	4	1	8	−7	0	Eliminated in group stage
10	Bolivia	4	0	0	4	1	25	−24	0	Eliminated in group stage

Source: CONMEBOL
(H) Hosts

== Qualification for international tournaments ==
=== Qualified teams for Olympic Football Tournament ===
Two teams from CONMEBOL qualified for the 2028 Summer Olympic women's football tournament in the United States. Eventually, Argentina may also qualify if they win the AFC–CONMEBOL play-off match.

Team	Qualified on	Previous appearances in Summer Olympics
Colombia	28 July 2025	3 (2012, 2016, 2024)
Brazil	29 July 2025	8 (1996, 2000, 2004, 2008, 2012, 2016, 2020, 2024)

=== Qualified teams for Pan American Games ===
The remaining three teams from CONMEBOL qualified for the 2027 Pan American Games women's football tournament, together with Peru which qualified as hosts.

Team	Qualified on	Previous appearances in Pan American Games
Peru	12 March 2024	1 (2019)
Paraguay	28 July 2025	3 (2007, 2019, 2023)
Argentina	28 July 2025	6 (2003, 2007, 2011, 2015, 2019, 2023)
Uruguay	29 July 2025	1 (2007)

^{2} Bold indicates champions for that year. Italic indicates hosts for that year.

== Controversies ==
=== MUFP and AUF Pre-tournament Labor Dispute ===
The Uruguayan women's national team refused to train for one week prior to the start of the final tournament in protest of alleged inadequate preparations by the Uruguayan Football Association (AUF) for the competition. Among the demands made by the players union, the Mutual Uruguaya De Futbolistas Profesionales (MUFP), were the full use of the national team training centre—the Complejo Celeste in Barros Blancos, improved training conditions and equipment, and an increase in per diem wages. The MUFP announced the resolution of the dispute on the evening of Tuesday, 8 July, three days before Uruguay's opening match against Ecuador on Friday, 11 July. To the International Federation of Professional Footballers (FIFPRO), MUFP General Secretary Mitchell Duarte said about the agreement:

"While there is still a lot of room for improvement, we are in a process of continuous improvement. There was a very good working relationship in this instance, and both parties were satisfied with the agreements reached."

=== Lack of Video Assistant Referee (VAR) in the Group Stage ===
Chilean defenders Yanara Aedo and Fernanda Pinilla criticized CONMEBOL's decision not to utilize VAR technology throughout the group stage of the tournament, with Aedo saying:

"It’s disrespectful that we don’t have VAR. For us, as players, it’s shameful to watch the [differences between] the Euros and the Copa América...In our last match [a 3-0 win over Peru], a legitimate goal was disallowed. It’s good that the game was broadcast so people could see the two penalties we weren’t given. I’m not saying Argentina didn’t deserve to win but VAR would have changed the game for them and us, for every player. The organisers should get their act together because we’re as much footballers as the men are."

=== Accusations of Inadequate Pre-match Warm-up Conditions ===
Following Brazil, hosts of the 2027 FIFA Women's World Cup, and Bolivia's group stage match at Estadio Gonzalo Pozo Ripalda, multiple Brazilian squad members, including veteran star Marta, and manager Arthur Elias publicly condemned CONMEBOL's decision to prohibit warm-ups on the match pitch. Starting striker Kerolin took to social media to voice her frustrations; she said, in reference to the concurrent UEFA Women's Euro 2025:

"While in Europe they break technology records, we're warming up in a MAXIMUM 20m room with the smell of paint. WEIRD!"

Midfielder Ary Borges directly challenged the president of CONMEBOL, Alejandro Domínguez, on the teams' warm-up conditions and other equity concerns—including the selection of tournament venue and the choice by CONMEBOL not to utilize VAR in the tournament's group stage; after the Bolivia match, she told commentator and former Brazilian international, Francielle Alberto:

"...it’s very difficult, because last year we had a men’s Copa América at good times, in good stadiums and we see...this disregard for women’s football and it’s a shame."

She added to Brazilian news outlet, Globo Esporte:

"Ask [Domínguez] if he could warm up in a 5 to 10 meter space that smells of paint. I think we had the example of the Men’s Copa América, with a huge structure. Why is the women’s tournament having this kind of thing?"

CONMEBOL later reversed the decision, saying in a statement to Reuters:

"From now on, in addition to goalkeepers who already had a 15-minute warm-up period on the field, outfield players will also be allowed to warm up on the pitch for the same duration... This decision was made after a detailed assessment of the condition of the playing surfaces at the competition’s stadiums to date, and after taking into account feedback from some participating teams."
