= Aldana Cometti =

Argentine footballer (born 1996)

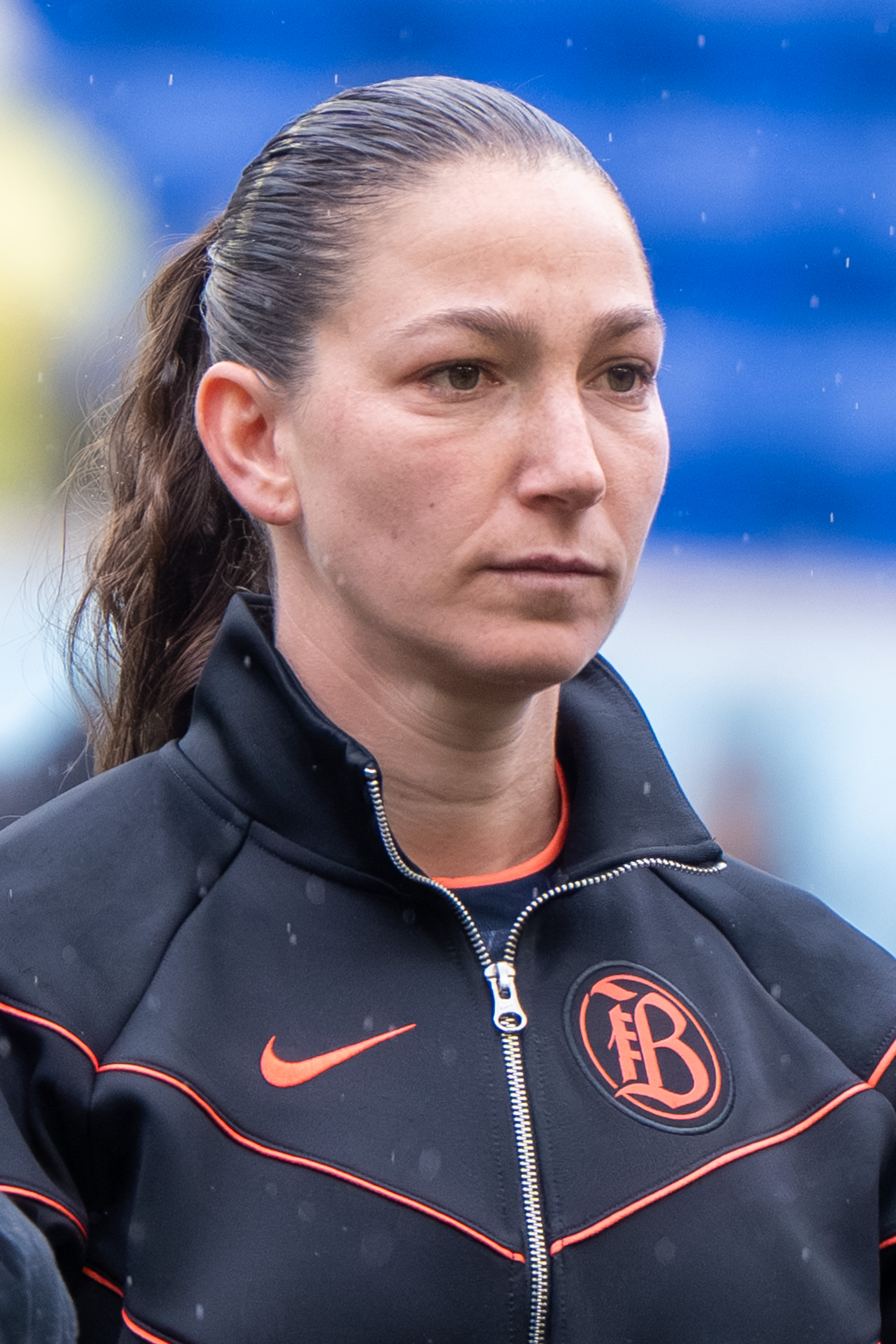
- Cometti with Bay FC in 2026

Personal information
- Date of birth: 3 March 1996 (age 30)
- Place of birth: Buenos Aires, Argentina
- Height: 1.66 m (5 ft 5 in)
- Positions: Centre-back; defensive midfielder

Team information
- Current team: Bay FC
- Number: 21

Youth career
- 2005–2009: Excursionistas
- 2009–2010: Arsenal de Sarandí
- 2010–2012: Independiente

Senior career*
Years	Team	Apps	(Gls)
2013–2014	River Plate		
2014–2016	Boca Juniors		
2016–2017	Granada		
2017–2018	Atlético Huila		
2018–2020	Sevilla	30	(0)
2020–2022	Levante	49	(2)
2022–2025	Madrid CFF	71	(9)
2025–2026	Fleury	13	(0)
2026–	Bay FC	22	(0)

International career^{‡}
2014–	Argentina	106	(11)
Medal record
Women's football
Representing Argentina
Copa América Femenina
Third place	2018 Chile
Third place	2022 Colombia
Third place	2025 Ecuador
South American Games
Gold medal – first place	2014 Santiago	Team
Pan American Games
Silver medal – second place	2019 Lima	Team
- * Club domestic league appearances and goals as of 05:02, 2 November 2026 (UTC) ‡ National team caps and goals as of 18 April 2026

Aldana Cometti (born 3 March 1996) is an Argentine professional footballer who plays as a centre-back for Bay FC of the National Women's Soccer League (NWSL) and the Argentina national team.

== Club career ==
On 4 March 2026, it was announced that Cometti had transferred from Fleury to NWSL side Bay FC for an undisclosed fee, signing a two-year contract with the club.

== International career ==
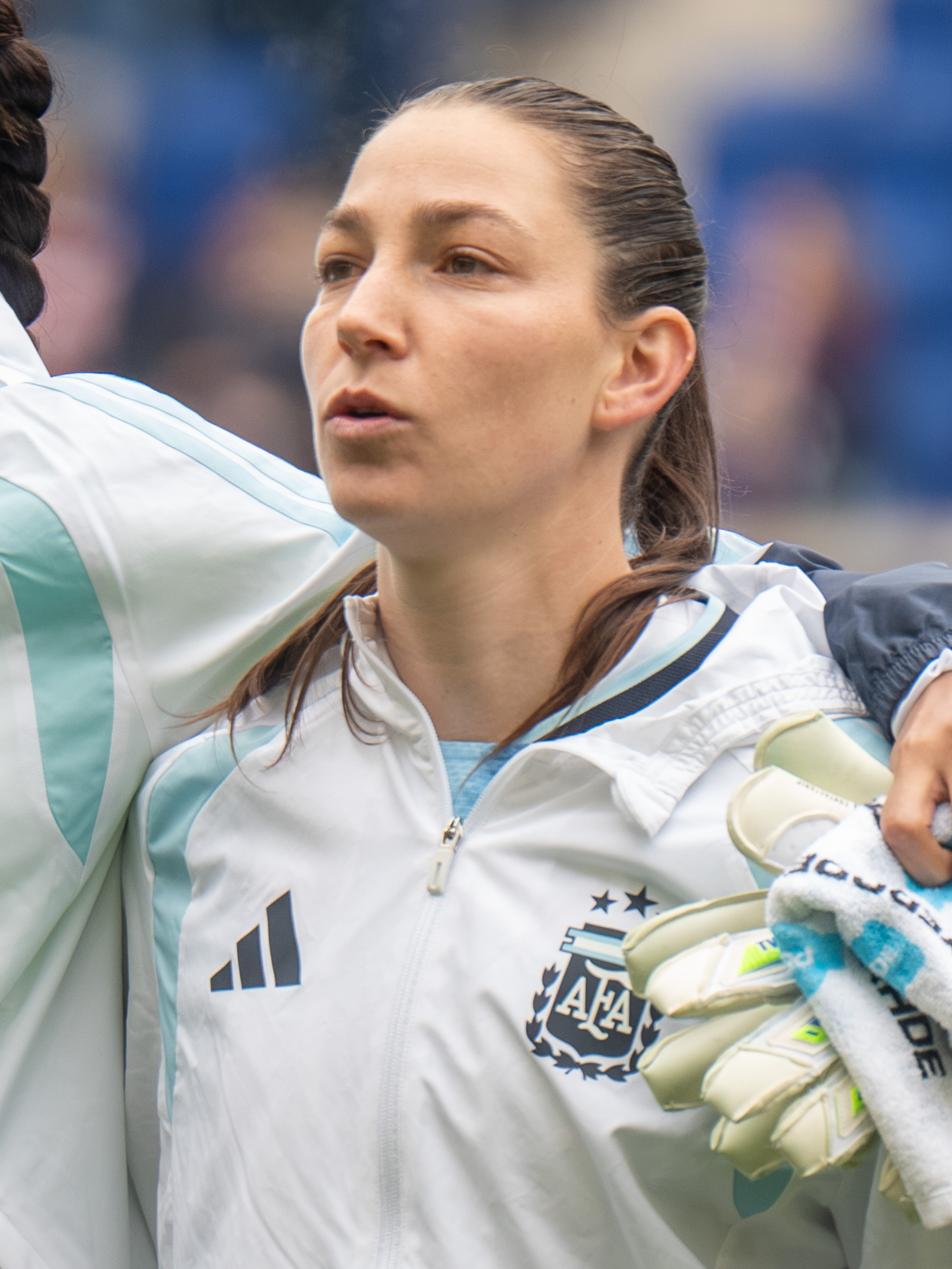
Cometti with Argentina in 2026

Cometti scored one goal at the 2014 Copa América Femenina. On 28 October 2025, she made her 100th international appearance in a 2–2 away draw with Uruguay during the Liga de Naciones, becoming the first Argentine player to achieve this feat.

== Career statistics ==
=== International ===
As of match played 14 April 2026

Appearances and goals by national team and year
National team	Year	Apps	Goals
Argentina	2014	14	1
Argentina	2017	2	0
Argentina	2018	13	2
Argentina	2019	15	1
Argentina	2021	9	0
Argentina	2022	11	0
Argentina	2023	15	3
Argentina	2024	8	0
Argentina	2025	14	4
Argentina	2026	5	0
Total		106	11

=== International goals ===
Scores and results list Argentina's goal tally first

No.	Date	Venue	Opponent	Score	Result	Competition
1	20 September 2014	Estadio Jorge Andrade, Azogues, Ecuador	Brazil	1–0	2–0	2014 Copa América Femenina
2	30 August 2018	Mayagüez Athletics Stadium, Mayagüez, Puerto Rico	Puerto Rico	2–0	3–0	Friendly
3	30 August 2018	Mayagüez Athletics Stadium, Mayagüez, Puerto Rico	Puerto Rico	3–0	3–0	Friendly
4	6 August 2019	Estadio Universidad San Marcos, Lima, Peru	Paraguay	2–0	3–0	2019 Pan American Games
5	20 February 2023	Waikato Stadium, Hamilton, New Zealand	New Zealand	2–0	2–0	Friendly
6	6 April 2023	Estadio Mario Alberto Kempes, Córdoba, Argentina	Venezuela	1–1	1–1	Friendly
7	25 October 2023	Estadio Elías Figueroa Brander, Valparaíso, Chile	Bolivia	1–0	3–0	2023 Pan American Games
8	18 July 2025	Estadio Banco Guayaquil, Quito, Ecuador	Chile	2–1	2–1	2025 Copa América Femenina
9	1 August 2025	Estadio Rodrigo Paz Delgado, Quito, Ecuador	Uruguay	1–0	2–2 (5–4 p)	2025 Copa América Femenina
10	24 October 2025	Estadio Diego Armando Maradona, Buenos Aires, Argentina	Paraguay	1–0	3–1	2025–26 CONMEBOL Liga de Naciones Femenina
11	2 December 2025	Estadio Florencio Sola, Banfield, Argentina	Bolivia	2–0	8–0	2025–26 CONMEBOL Liga de Naciones Femenina

== Honours ==
Boca Juniors

- Supercopa Argentina: 2015

Atlético Huila

- Copa Libertadores Femenina: 2018

Argentina

- South American Games: 2014

== Personal life ==
Cometti is a supporter of River Plate.

== See also ==
- List of women's footballers with 100 or more international caps
