= Duda Sampaio =

Brazilian footballer (born 2001)

Personal information
- Full name: Maria Eduarda Ferreira Sampaio
- Date of birth: 18 May 2001 (age 25)
- Place of birth: Rio Casca, Brazil
- Height: 1.68 m (5 ft 6 in)
- Position: Midfielder

Team information
- Current team: Corinthians
- Number: 10

Youth career
- América Mineiro

Senior career*
Years	Team	Apps	(Gls)
2017–2018	América Mineiro	8	(1)
2019–2021	Cruzeiro	38	(21)
2022	Internacional	20	(4)
2023–	Corinthians	76	(21)

International career^{‡}
2019–2020	Brazil U20	7	(1)
2022–	Brazil	46	(4)
Medal record
Women's football
Representing Brazil
Olympic Games
Silver medal – second place	2024 Paris
Copa América Femenina
Gold medal – first place	2022 Colombia
Gold medal – first place	2025 Ecuador
- * Club domestic league appearances and goals as of 14:07, 28 June 2023 (UTC) ‡ National team caps and goals as of 24 November 2022 (UTC)

Maria Eduarda Ferreira Sampaio (born 18 May 2001), known as Duda Sampaio or just Duda, is a Brazilian professional footballer who plays as a midfielder for Corinthians and the Brazil women's national football team.

== Club career ==
Born in Rio Casca, Minas Gerais, Duda began her career with América Mineiro, making her senior debut in 2017. Ahead of the 2019 season, after already becoming a starter, she moved to Cruzeiro.

On 30 December 2021, Duda opted to leave Cruzeiro as her contract was expiring. The following 19 January, she signed for Internacional.

On 27 December 2022, Duda signed for Corinthians. On 3 September 204, she extended her contract with the club until the end of 2028.

== International career ==
After representing Brazil at under-20 level, Duda received her first call up for the full side on 2 September 2020, for a period of trainings. She made her international debut on 10 July 2022, coming on as a second-half substitute for Ary Borges in a 4–0 Copa América Femenina win over Argentina.

Duda was called up to the Brazil squad for the 2022 Copa América Femenina, which Brazil finished as winners.

Duda was called up to the Brazil squad for the 2023 FIFA Women's World Cup.

On 1 February 2024, Duda was called up to the Brazil squad for the 2024 CONCACAF W Gold Cup.

On 2 July 2024, Duda was called up to the Brazil squad for the 2024 Summer Olympics.

On 9 June 2025, Duda was called up to the Brazil squad for the 2025 Copa América Femenina.

== Personal life ==
Duda spent her childhood in the countryside, helping her family to milk cows, pick vegetables and make sauces.

== Career statistics ==
=== International ===
As of 10 July 2022

Brazil
Year	Apps	Goals
2022	1	0
Total	1	0

=== International goals ===
No.	Date	Venue	Opponent	Score	Result	Competition
1.	21 July 2022	Estadio Olímpico Pascual Guerrero, Cali, Colombia	Peru	2–0	6–0	2022 Copa América Femenina
2.	2 July 2023	Estádio Nacional Mané Garrincha, Brasília, Brazil	Chile	4–0	4–0	Friendly
3.	13 July 2025	Estadio Gonzalo Pozo Ripalda, Quito, Ecuador	Venezuela	2–0	2–0	2025 Copa América Femenina
4.	22 July 2025	Estadio Gonzalo Pozo Ripalda, Quito, Ecuador	Paraguay	4–1	4–1	2025 Copa América Femenina

== Honours ==
América Mineiro

- Campeonato Mineiro: 2017, 2018

Cruzeiro

- Campeonato Mineiro: 2019

Corinthians

- Copa Libertadores Femenina: 2023, 2024, 2025
- Campeonato Brasileiro Série A1: 2023, 2024, 2025
- Supercopa do Brasil: 2023, 2024
- Campeonato Paulista: 2023
- FIFA Women's Champions Cup runner up: 2026

Brazil

- Copa América Femenina: 2022, 2025
- Summer Olympics silver medal: 2024

Individual

- Bola de Prata: 2022, 2023, 2024
- Campeonato Brasileiro Série A1 Team of the Year: 2022, 2025
