= Rio Casca =

Coordinates: 20°13′33″S 42°39′03″W

- Municipality
- Municipality of Rio Casca
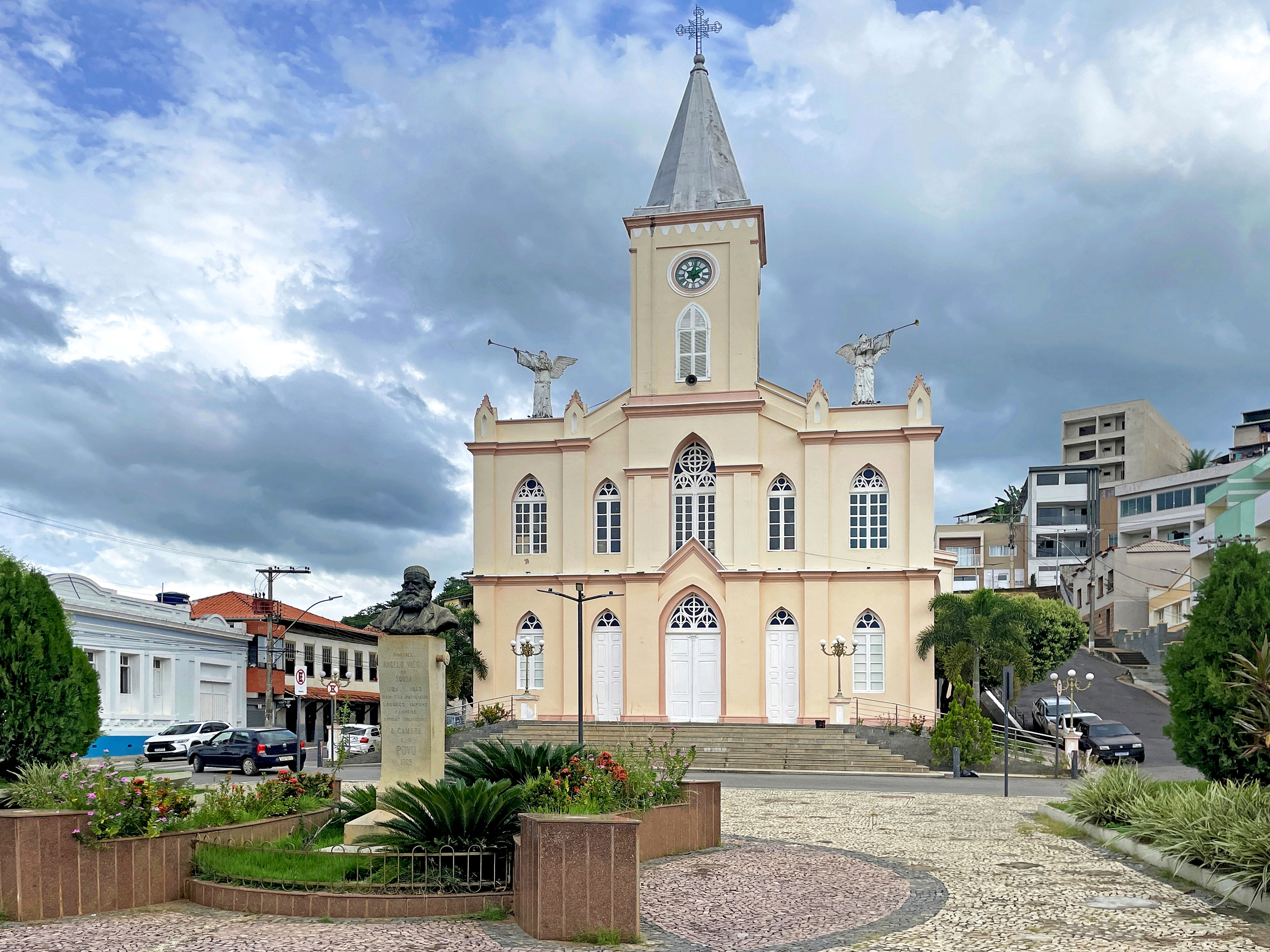
- Furriel Ângelo Vieira de Souza Square with the Our Lady of Immaculate Conception Matriz Church in the background

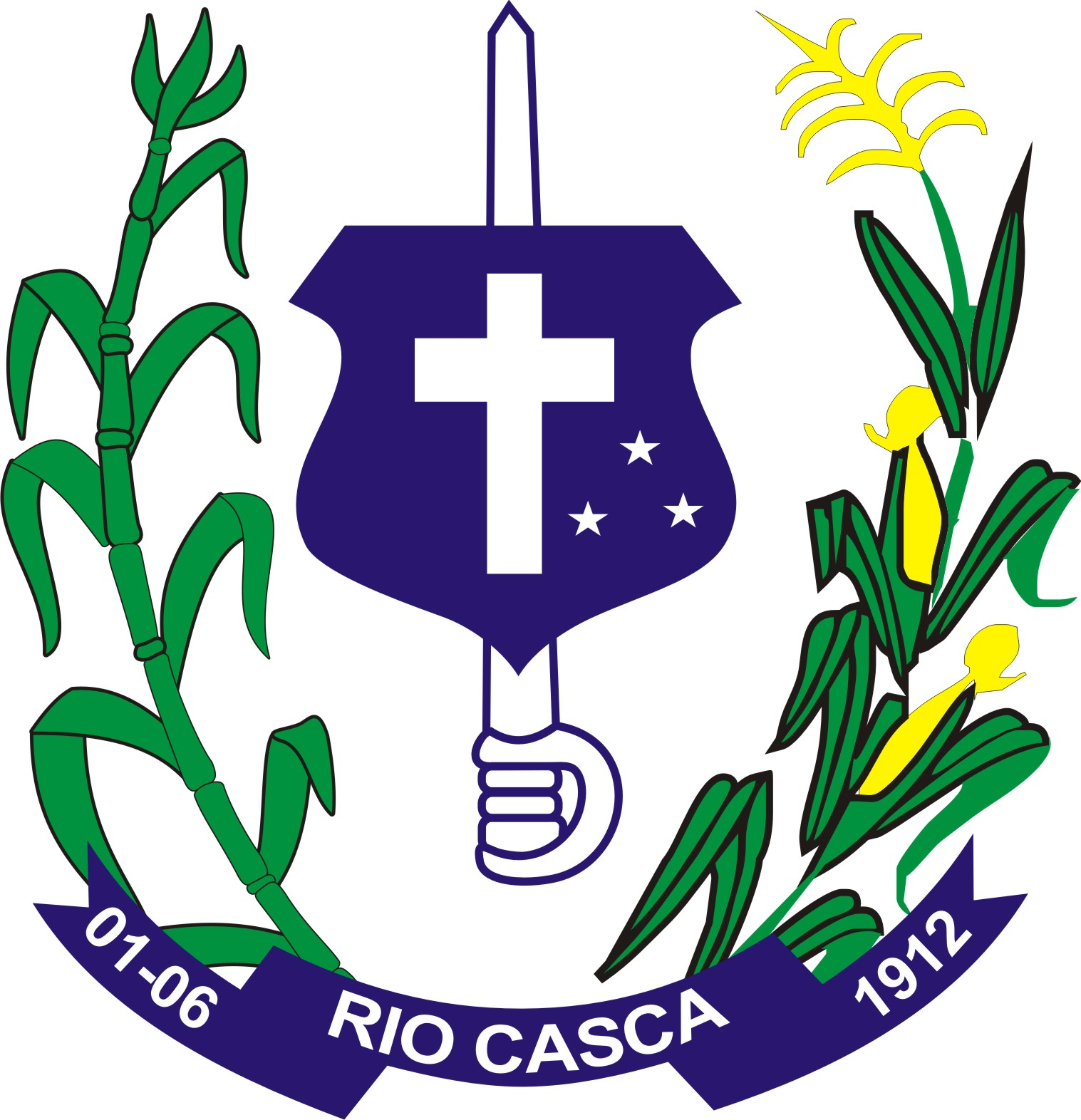
- Flag Coat of arms

- Location in Minas Gerais
- Country: Brazil
- Region: Southeast
- State: Minas Gerais
- Founded: 1 June 1912

Government
  - Mayor: Adriano Alvarenga (PP)

Area
  - Total: 384.174 km^{2} (148.330 sq mi)
- Elevation: 333.87 m (1,095.4 ft)

Population (2021)
  - Total: 13,384
  - Density: 36.95/km^{2} (95.7/sq mi)
- Demonym: rio-casquense
- Time zone: UTC−3 (BRT)
- Postal Code: 35370-000 to 35379-999
- HDI (2010): 0.650 – medium
- Website: www.riocasca.mg.gov.br

Rio Casca is a Brazilian municipality located in the state of Minas Gerais. The city belongs to the mesoregion of Zona da Mata and to the microregion of Ponte Nova. As of 2020, the population was 13,473 in a total area of 384 km^{2} (148 sq mi).

== See also ==
- List of municipalities in Minas Gerais
