= Leicy Santos =

Colombian footballer (born 1996)

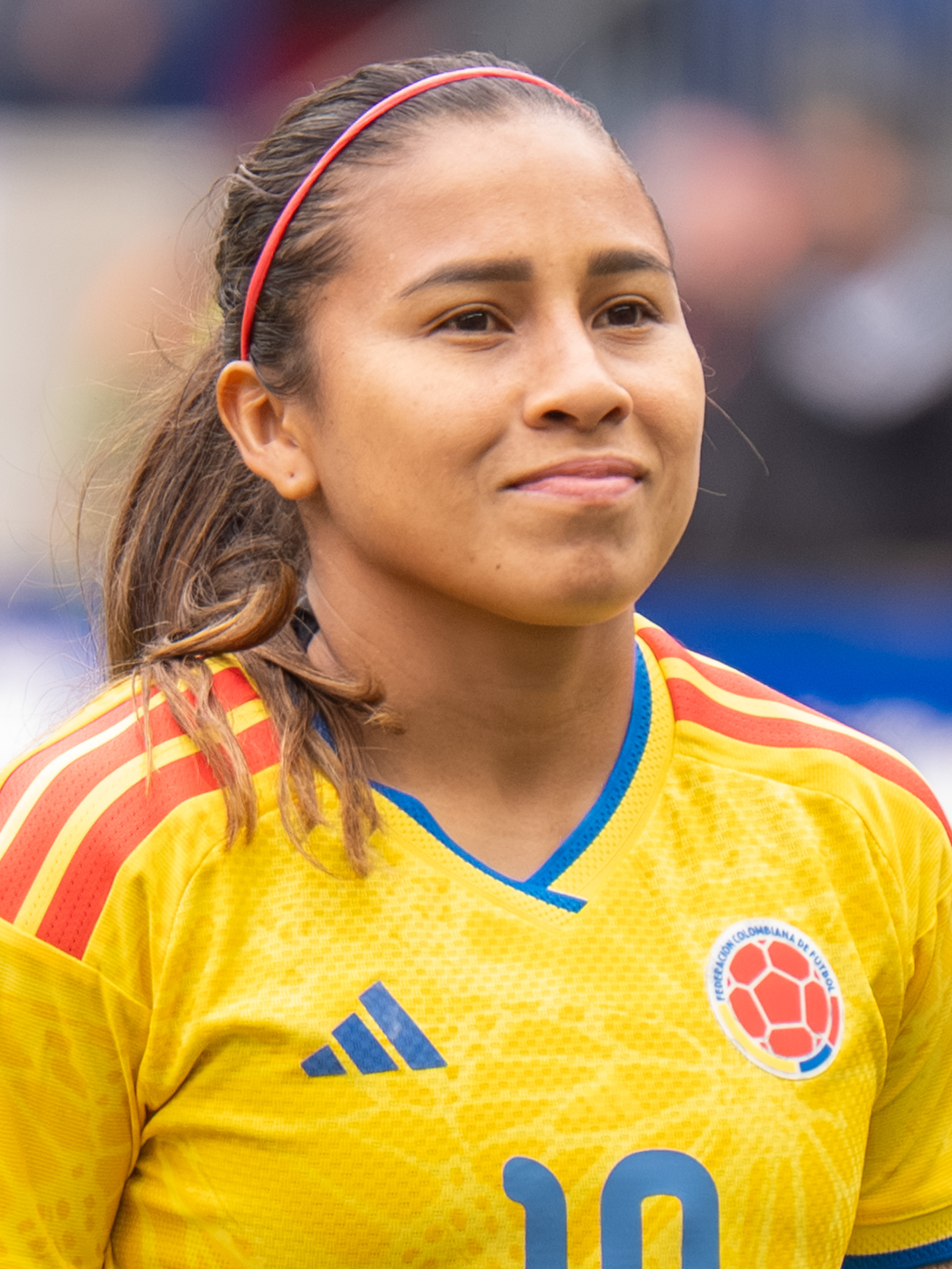
- Santos with Colombia in 2026

Personal information
- Full name: Leicy María Santos Herrera
- Date of birth: 16 May 1996 (age 30)
- Place of birth: Lorica, Colombia
- Height: 1.59 m (5 ft 3 in)
- Position: Midfielder

Team information
- Current team: Washington Spirit
- Number: 10

Youth career
- 2009–2016: Club Besser

College career
Years	Team	Apps	(Gls)
2015	Iowa Central Tritons	11	(7)

Senior career*
Years	Team	Apps	(Gls)
2016	Future Soccer		(12)
2017–2019	Santa Fe		
2019–2024	Atlético Madrid	100	(15)
2024–	Washington Spirit	45	(8)

International career^{‡}
2012	Colombia U17	3	(0)
2013–2015	Colombia U20	2	(2)
2014–	Colombia	58	(16)
Medal record
Women's football
Representing Colombia
Copa América Femenina
Runner-up	2014 Ecuador
Runner-up	2022 Colombia
Runner-up	2025 Ecuador
CONMEBOL Women's Nations League
Winner	2025–26
Pan American Games
Gold medal – first place	2019 Lima	Team
Silver medal – second place	2015 Toronto	Team
- * Club domestic league appearances and goals as of 05:30, 15 November 2026 (UTC) ‡ National team caps and goals as of 13 August 2024

Leicy María Santos Herrera (born 16 May 1996) is a Colombian professional footballer who plays as a midfielder for National Women's Soccer League club Washington Spirit and the Colombia national team.

Raised in rural Córdoba, Santos moved to Bogotá as a teenager to join Club Besser and won the NJCAA national championship with Iowa Central in 2015. She was one of the leading players in Santa Fe's title in the inaugural Colombian Women's Football League in 2017, and in 2019 acted as the players' spokesperson in negotiations that saved the league. At Atlético Madrid from 2019 to 2024, she became the first Colombian woman to score in the UEFA Women's Champions League, received the Trofeo EFE as the most valuable Latin American player in Spanish football, and won the Supercopa de España and the Copa de la Reina. With Washington Spirit, she won the 2025 NWSL Challenge Cup, scoring the late equalizer in the final.

Santos made her senior international debut in 2014. She has played at two FIFA Women's World Cups and two Olympic Games, won Pan American Games gold in 2019 and silver in 2015, and been a runner-up at three editions of the Copa América Femenina. In 2026, she was part of the Colombia side that won the inaugural CONMEBOL Women's Nations League.

== Early life ==
Santos was born on 16 May 1996 in San Sebastián, a rural settlement in the municipality of Santa Cruz de Lorica, Córdoba. Her father, Elizaith Santos, who had played for Córdoba's departmental under-20 team, encouraged her to play from an early age. Her mother was initially opposed and insisted she help with housework instead.

As a child Santos played on boys' teams and was often the only girl at tournaments. After watching her play, César Correa, a friend of her father's, recommended that she try out for Club Besser in Bogotá, which was looking for female players. With her family and friends helping to pay for the trip, she moved to Bogotá with Correa; her parents followed six months later. With coach Pedro Rodríguez, she helped form Club Besser's women's team, and her performances there led to selection for Bogotá's regional side and Colombia's under-17 team. She stayed with Club Besser until 2016.

In 2015 Santos played college soccer in the United States for Iowa Central Community College, scoring a hat-trick in her second game. She finished with seven goals and three assists in 11 games. Iowa Central won the NJCAA national championship that November after she assisted the only goal of the final against Eastern Florida State College.

== Club career ==
=== Santa Fe and Generaciones Palmiranas (2016–2019) ===
In 2016, alongside the announcement of a new Colombian Women's Football League, Santa Fe formed an alliance with the amateur club Future Soccer to build a professional women's team. Santos played for the side in that year's national amateur club championship, in which it went unbeaten through 26 matches before losing in the semi-finals, and was regarded as one of its best players. Her form earned a call-up to Colombia's squad for the 2016 Summer Olympics.

After the Olympics, Santos temporarily joined Club Deportivo Generaciones Palmiranas for the 2016 Copa Libertadores Femenina. She made her debut on 7 December against Bolivia's San Martín de Porres, and three days later scored a hat-trick in a 7–0 win over Uruguay's Nacional. Generaciones Palmiranas went out after a draw with Brazil's Foz Cataratas, and Santos returned to Santa Fe for the first professional season.

Santos made her professional league debut on 19 February 2017 in a 3–0 win over La Equidad. A week later, on 26 February, she scored her first professional goals, completing a hat-trick. Santa Fe won the inaugural league title in front of 33,327 spectators at Estadio El Campín, a record crowd for women's football in Colombia, and Santos was widely named as the team's standout player. As champions, Santa Fe entered the 2017 Copa Libertadores Femenina; Santos scored twice in a 9–2 group-stage win over Bolivia's Club Deportivo ITA, but the team was eliminated by Corinthians in its final group match.

Santa Fe opened the 2018 season with a defeat, then won its second match 10–0, with Santos scoring four goals. The team finished first in the regular season, and Santos scored in both legs of the quarter-final win over Cortuluá before Santa Fe lost the semi-final to Atlético Nacional.

Early in 2019, players from the professional league and the national team made complaints of sexual and labour abuse, homophobia and misogyny against the Colombian Football Federation, and the league's 2019 season was briefly cancelled. Santos acted as the players' spokesperson in meetings with the Government of Colombia and club directors, who agreed on 19 March to continue the professional league. She played only twice for Santa Fe that season because of her call-up for the 2019 Pan American Games and her move to Spain, and the club marked her final appearance with a farewell tribute.

=== Atlético Madrid (2019–2024) ===
On 4 August 2019, Atlético Madrid announced an agreement with Santa Fe to take Santos on loan for the 2019–20 season. She made her debut as a second-half substitute for Toni Duggan on 7 September 2019 in a 1–0 win over Sporting de Huelva at the Estadio Nueva Condomina. Her first goal for the club came on 26 October in a 4–1 win at Real Sociedad. Having started the season on the bench, she became a regular starter when Virginia Torrecilla and Duggan were injured, and she had five goals and one assist in 20 league matches when the season was halted by the COVID-19 pandemic. She also played in the Supercopa semi-final defeat to Barcelona. Diario AS called her the revelation of Atlético's season, and the club extended her stay.

Santos began the 2020–21 season on the bench while recovering from COVID-19, but soon returned to the starting line-up. In December 2020 the Spanish news agency EFE awarded her the Trofeo EFE as the most valuable Latin American player of the 2019–20 Liga Iberdrola season. On 15 December 2020, she became the first Colombian woman to score in the UEFA Women's Champions League, in a 5–0 second-leg win over Servette in the round of 32. Despite inconsistent league results, Atlético won the Supercopa in January 2021. She made 38 appearances and scored five goals that season, four in the league and one in the Champions League, and Atlético's supporters voted her the club's Five-Star Player (Jugadora Cinco Estrellas) of the season.

Santos was again used mainly as a substitute at the start of the 2021–22 season before winning back a starting place. Atlético finished fourth, one point short of Champions League qualification, lost the Supercopa final to Barcelona and went out of the Copa de la Reina to Sporting de Huelva in the round of 16. The IFFHS named her in its CONMEBOL women's team of the year for 2022, having also selected her for 2020.

The 2022–23 season was disrupted by injuries: abdominal problems, a muscle strain in her right leg and, in May 2023, a first-degree sprain that kept her out of the Copa de la Reina semi-final. She linked the injuries partly to playing constantly without rest. Atlético changed coaches and finished fourth, and won the Copa de la Reina final against Real Madrid on penalties after coming back from 2–0 down in stoppage time; Santos missed the final through injury.

Santos was a starter in the first half of 2023–24, but muscle injuries returned in the new year. After a Supercopa exit and dropped points in February, Manolo Cano was replaced as head coach by the reserve-team coach Arturo Ruiz, and Atlético won a run of matches without her to finish third and qualify for the Champions League. She left at the end of the season, having made more than 100 league appearances for the club.

=== Washington Spirit (2024–present) ===
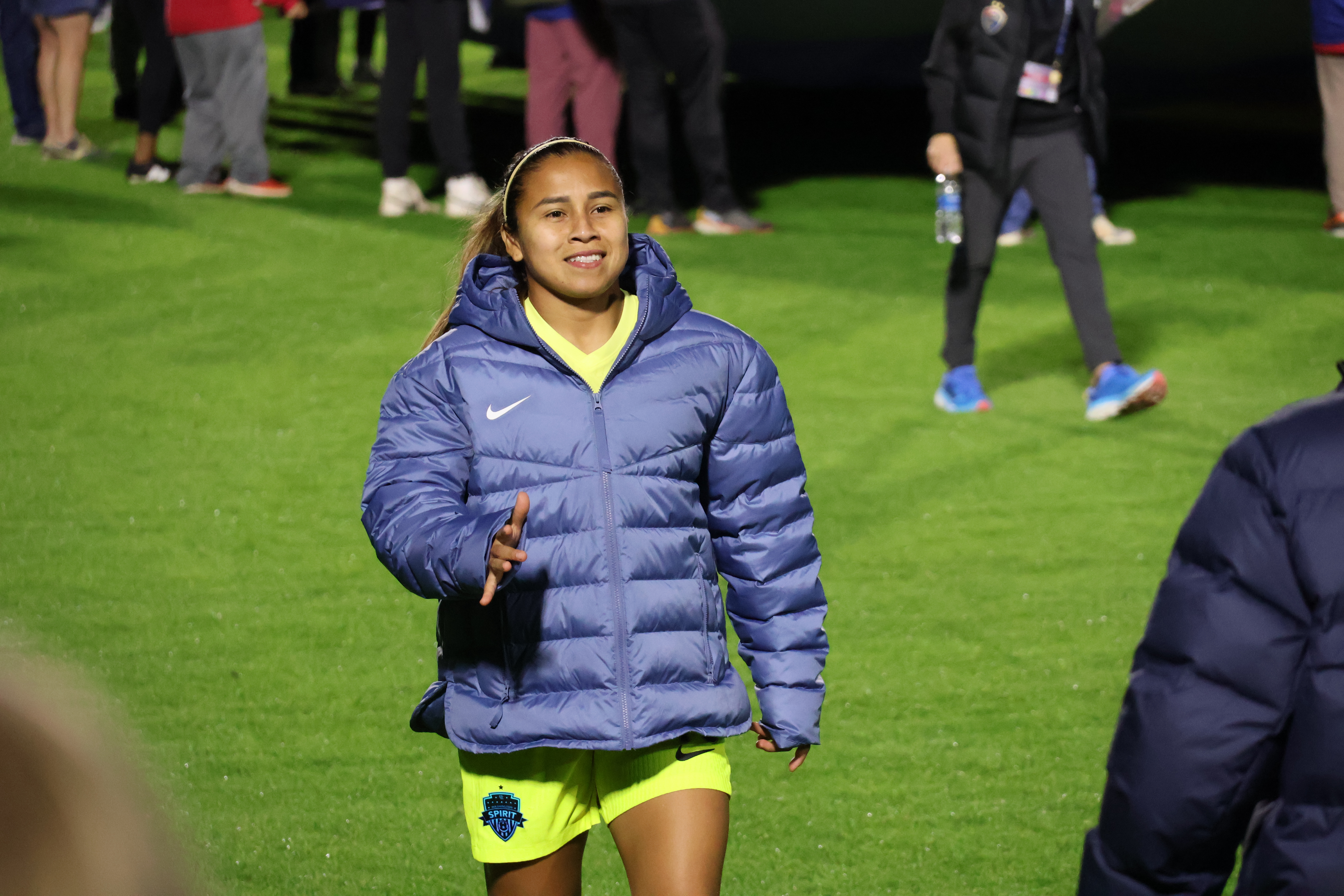
Santos playing for the Washington Spirit in 2024

On 2 April 2024, the Washington Spirit announced that Santos had signed a three-year contract and would join after the 2023–24 Liga F season. Wearing the number 10, she started the 2024 NWSL Championship at CPKC Stadium on 23 November, which the Spirit lost 1–0 to the Orlando Pride after a 37th-minute goal by Barbra Banda.

The two teams met again in the 2025 NWSL Challenge Cup on 7 March 2025 at Inter.co Stadium in Orlando, where the Spirit were without five injured starters. Santos equalised in the 72nd minute with a direct free kick over the wall into the top corner, the first direct free-kick goal and the latest equaliser in a Challenge Cup final, then scored in the shootout as Washington won 4–2. She started the 2025 NWSL Championship at PayPal Park on 22 November, which the Spirit lost 1–0 to Gotham FC after an 80th-minute goal by Rose Lavelle, finishing as runners-up for the second year in a row.

On 25 April 2026, Santos scored her first NWSL brace, including the winning goal, in a 4–0 win over the Kansas City Current, and was named NWSL Player of the Week. In July her 37th-minute volley in a 2–0 win over the North Carolina Courage, her fifth goal of the season, was voted the league's Goal of the Week. In September 2026 she signed a one-year extension through the 2027 season, having scored nine goals, three of them direct free kicks, and provided ten assists in all competitions for the club.

== International career ==
=== Youth ===
Santos was selected for Colombia's under-17 and under-20 teams in 2012 and 2013, and won a gold medal with the under-20 side at the 2013 Bolivarian Games in Peru.

=== 2014–2016: First tournaments ===
Santos received her first senior call-up in 2014. Listed as a Club Besser player, she was named in the 22-player squad for the 2014 Copa América Femenina in Ecuador. Colombia finished second behind Brazil after a goalless draw between the two in Quito on 28 September, and qualified for both the 2015 FIFA Women's World Cup and the 2016 Summer Olympics. At the World Cup in Canada, the 19-year-old made her tournament debut as a substitute, as understudy to Yoreli Rincón. She also played at the 2015 Pan American Games, where Colombia lost the final 4–0 to Brazil in Hamilton, Ontario, to take silver. On 14 July 2016, she was named to the squad for the Rio Olympics. By 2017 she was described as the national team's captain.

=== 2018–2019: Pan American gold ===
Santos was called up for the 2018 Copa América Femenina in Chile. At the 2019 Pan American Games in Lima, she opened the scoring with a header in the semi-final against Costa Rica on 6 August and assisted Catalina Usme's extra-time winner in a 4–3 victory. Colombia then beat Argentina 7–6 on penalties after a 1–1 draw in the final on 10 August to win the country's first Pan American gold medal in women's football.

=== 2022–2023: Copa América final and World Cup quarter-final ===
On 3 July 2022, Santos was named to Colombia's squad for the 2022 Copa América Femenina, played on home soil. She provided an assist in the opening win over Paraguay, and Colombia reached the final in Bucaramanga, losing 1–0 to Brazil on a 39th-minute Debinha penalty.

Santos recovered from her injuries in time to be named on 4 July 2023 to Colombia's squad for the 2023 FIFA Women's World Cup, wearing the number 10. During the tournament she told FIFPRO that conditions had improved through collective action, recalling that Colombian players had once gone "two or three years without being paid, playing for free", and calling for a qualification system based on regular international windows instead of a single tournament. Colombia beat Jamaica 1–0 in the round of 16 to reach a Women's World Cup quarter-final for the first time. In that quarter-final Santos lobbed England goalkeeper Mary Earps to give Colombia the lead, in a manner commentators compared to Ronaldinho's lob over David Seaman in the 2002 men's World Cup quarter-final; England came back to win 2–1.

=== 2024–present: Olympics, Copa América final and Nations League title ===
On 5 July 2024, Santos was named to the squad for the Paris Olympics. In the quarter-final against Spain in Lyon on 3 August, she scored Colombia's opening goal and assisted Mayra Ramírez for the second, but Spain came back to draw 2–2 and won 4–2 on penalties.

At the 2025 Copa América Femenina in Ecuador, Santos scored in the 115th minute of the final against Brazil to make it 4–4, but Brazil won 5–4 on penalties, leaving Colombia runners-up for the second consecutive edition. CONMEBOL named her in its team of the semi-finals and final, alongside Linda Caicedo and Mayra Ramírez.

Colombia's next competitive campaign was the inaugural 2025–26 CONMEBOL Women's Nations League, which also served as qualification for the 2027 FIFA Women's World Cup. In the opening round, Santos scored twice against Peru and once against Ecuador, and was named in CONMEBOL's team of the round. Colombia went through the competition unbeaten, with six wins and two draws, and clinched the title on the final matchday, 9 June 2026, with a 4–3 win over Paraguay at the Estadio Defensores del Chaco in Asunción, in which Santos provided an assist. Finishing two points ahead of Argentina, Colombia won the first edition of the competition and qualified directly for the 2027 World Cup in Brazil. Santos's seven goal contributions were the joint third-highest in the tournament.

== Style of play ==
Santos is a creative attacking midfielder who usually wears the number 10 for club and country, and has been described as one of the most complete players in the Colombian team, able to both create and finish chances. Her ball control, vision and quick thinking have been singled out. She is also a set-piece specialist, with three direct free-kick goals for the Washington Spirit by September 2026, including her equaliser in the 2025 Challenge Cup final.

== Personal life ==
In 2016, Santos and fellow footballer Lina Arciniegas co-founded Cacahuates, a Colombian company that makes nut butters. She holds a degree in sports management from Sergio Arboleda University. In 2021 she joined Common Goal, pledging part of her salary to football-based social projects. She also received a "10 Colombianos" award from the Colombian embassy in Spain.

On 1 July 2024, Santos proposed to her partner, Geraldine Matallana, in San Antero, Córdoba, and announced the engagement on 7 July.

== International goals ==
Scores and results list Colombia's goal tally first.

No.	Date	Venue	Opponent	Score	Result	Competition
1.	10 March 2014	Estadio Bicentenario de La Florida, Santiago, Chile	Uruguay	1–0	2–0	2014 South American Games
2.	13 September 2014	Estadio Bellavista, Ambato, Ecuador	Uruguay	3–0	4–0	2014 Copa América Femenina
3.	8 April 2018	Estadio La Portada, La Serena, Chile	Paraguay	5–0	5–1	2018 Copa América Femenina
4.	10 April 2018	Estadio La Portada, La Serena, Chile	Peru	2–0	3–0	2018 Copa América Femenina
5.	31 July 2019	Estadio Universidad San Marcos, Lima, Peru	Jamaica	1–0	2–0	2019 Pan American Games
6.	31 July 2019	Estadio Universidad San Marcos, Lima, Peru	Jamaica	2–0	2–0	2019 Pan American Games
7.	6 August 2019	Estadio Universidad San Marcos, Lima, Peru	Costa Rica	1–0	4–3 (a.e.t.)	2019 Pan American Games
8.	28 November 2021	Estadio Deportivo Cali, Palmira, Colombia	Uruguay	3–2	3–2	Friendly
9.	9 April 2022	Estadio Olímpico Pascual Guerrero, Cali, Colombia	Venezuela	1–2	2–2	Friendly
10.	9 April 2022	Estadio Olímpico Pascual Guerrero, Cali, Colombia	Venezuela	2–2	2–2	Friendly
11.	11 July 2022	Estadio Olímpico Pascual Guerrero, Cali, Colombia	Bolivia	1–0	3–0	2022 Copa América Femenina
12.	12 October 2022	Estadio Olímpico Pascual Guerrero, Cali, Colombia	Paraguay	3–0	4–0	Friendly
13.	12 October 2022	Estadio Olímpico Pascual Guerrero, Cali, Colombia	Paraguay	4–0	4–0	Friendly
14.	12 August 2023	Stadium Australia, Sydney, Australia	England	1–0	1–2	2023 FIFA Women's World Cup
15.	28 July 2024	Stade de Lyon, Décines-Charpieu, France	New Zealand	2–0	2–0	2024 Summer Olympics
16.	3 August 2024	Stade de Lyon, Décines-Charpieu, France	Spain	1–0	2–2 (a.e.t.) (2–4 p)	2024 Summer Olympics
17.	19 July 2025	Estadio Gonzalo Pozo Ripalda, Quito, Ecuador	Paraguay	4–1	4–1	2025 Copa América Femenina
18.	2 August 2025	Estadio Rodrigo Paz Delgado, Quito, Ecuador	Brazil	4–4	4–4 (a.e.t.) (4–5 p)	2025 Copa América Femenina
19.	24 October 2025	Estadio Atanasio Girardot, Medellín, Colombia	Peru	1–0	4–1	2025–26 CONMEBOL Women's Nations League
20.	24 October 2025	Estadio Atanasio Girardot, Medellín, Colombia	Peru	3–1	4–1	2025–26 CONMEBOL Women's Nations League
21.	28 October 2025	Estadio Rodrigo Paz Delgado, Quito, Ecuador	Ecuador	1–0	2–1	2025–26 CONMEBOL Women's Nations League
22.	1 March 2026	Geodis Park, Nashville, United States	Canada	1–3	1–4	2026 SheBelieves Cup
23.	10 April 2026	Estadio Olímpico Pascual Guerrero, Cali, Colombia	Venezuela	1–1	2–1	2025–26 CONMEBOL Women's Nations League

== Honours ==
Iowa Central Tritons

- NJCAA Women's Soccer Championship: 2015

Independiente Santa Fe

- Colombian Women's Football League: 2017

Atlético Madrid

- Supercopa de España Femenina: 2020–21
- Copa de la Reina: 2022–23

Washington Spirit

- NWSL Challenge Cup: 2025
- NWSL Championship runner-up: 2024, 2025

Colombia U20

- Bolivarian Games gold medal: 2013

Colombia

- CONMEBOL Women's Nations League: 2025–26
- Pan American Games gold medal: 2019; silver medal: 2015
- Copa América Femenina runner-up: 2014, 2022, 2025

Individual

- Trofeo EFE: 2020
- IFFHS CONMEBOL Women's Team of the Year: 2020, 2022
- Atlético Madrid Five-Star Player of the Season (supporters' award): 2020–21
- Copa América Femenina team of the semi-finals and final: 2025
