= Wendy Bonilla =

Colombian footballer (born 2002)

Personal information
- Full name: Wendy Katerine Bonilla Candelo
- Date of birth: 8 July 2002 (age 24)
- Place of birth: Buenaventura, Valle del Cauca, Colombia
- Height: 1.60 m (5 ft 3 in)
- Position: Forward

Team information
- Current team: Santos

Senior career*
Years	Team	Apps	(Gls)
2018	Cortuluá		
2019–2020	América de Cali		
2021	Alianza Lima		
2021–2024	América de Cali	60	(10)
2024	→ Santa Fe (loan)		
2025–2026	UNAM	22	(3)
2026–	Santos		

International career^{‡}
2018	Colombia U17	4	(0)
2022	Colombia U20	6	(0)
2019–	Colombia	6	(1)
Medal record
Women's football
Representing Colombia
Copa América Femenina
Silver medal – second place	2025 Ecuador
- * Club domestic league appearances and goals as of 31 January 2026 ‡ National team caps and goals as of 27 February 2025

Wendy Katerine Bonilla Candelo (born 8 July 2002) is a Colombian professional association football player who plays as a forward for Campeonato Brasileiro Série A1 club Santos and the Colombia national team. She is also known professionally as Wendy Candelo.

Bonilla began her senior career with Cortuluá before joining América de Cali, with whom she won the Colombian Women's Football League in 2019 and 2022. She later played for Alianza Lima in Peru, represented Santa Fe in the 2024 Copa Libertadores Femenina, and played for Mexican club UNAM. In 2026, she moved to Santos, her third club outside Colombia.

At international level, Bonilla represented Colombia at under-17 and under-20 level before making her senior debut in 2019. She scored in the 2025 SheBelieves Cup and the 2025 Copa América Femenina, where Colombia finished runners-up to Brazil.

== Early life ==
Bonilla was born in Buenaventura, Valle del Cauca, Colombia. She developed as an attacking player in Colombia and entered the country's organised women's football system before making her senior debut with Cortuluá in 2018, at the age of 16.

== Club career ==
=== Early career ===
Born in Buenaventura, Valle del Cauca, Bonilla began her senior career with Cortuluá in 2018. She joined América de Cali in 2019 and won the 2019 Liga Femenina title during her first season with the club.

Bonilla moved to Peruvian club Alianza Lima in 2021, playing in the Peruvian Primera División Femenina. She returned to América later that year and became part of the club's attacking rotation.

During the 2022 Liga Femenina season, Bonilla scored six goals in 13 league appearances and helped América win the championship. She also scored América's opening goal in its 1–0 victory over Santiago Morning in the 2022 Copa Libertadores Femenina. Bonilla opened the scoring in the 65th minute after arriving at the far post to finish a cross, giving América an important victory in its opening group-stage match.

América finished third in the 2022 Copa Libertadores Femenina. Bonilla remained with the club through 2024 and recorded 60 league appearances and 10 goals during her second spell in Cali.

=== Loan to Santa Fe ===
In September 2024, Bonilla joined Santa Fe on loan for the club's campaign in the 2024 Copa Libertadores Femenina.

She started Santa Fe's quarter-final against Alianza Lima, but received a straight red card during the match. The suspension ruled her out of Santa Fe's semi-final against Dragonas Independiente del Valle and the final against Corinthians. Santa Fe defeated Dragonas Independiente del Valle in the semi-final to reach the final, where it lost 2–0 to Corinthians.

=== Pumas UNAM ===
Bonilla joined Mexican club UNAM, commonly known as Pumas, in January 2025. The club announced her signing on 31 December 2024 as one of seven additions for the Clausura 2025 tournament.

Bonilla made the move after four seasons with América and a short loan spell at Santa Fe. At Pumas, she continued to play as a forward and was used in the club's attacking rotation during the 2025 and 2025–26 Liga MX Femenil campaigns. She recorded 22 league appearances and three goals for the club.

=== Santos ===
On 11 August 2026, Bonilla was announced as a player for Brazilian club Santos, where she was presented under the name Wendy Candelo. She signed a contract through the end of the 2026 season and joined Santos's women's team, known as the Sereias da Vila, for its Brazilian and São Paulo State competitions.

The transfer marked Bonilla's first move to Brazilian football and her third foreign club after Alianza Lima and UNAM. Santos identified her as an attacking reinforcement with experience in Colombia, Peru and Mexico, as well as at international level with Colombia.

== International career ==
=== Youth teams ===
Bonilla represented Colombia at under-17 level in 2018 and was selected for the 2018 FIFA U-17 Women's World Cup. She later played for the Colombia under-20 team and represented the country at the 2022 FIFA U-20 Women's World Cup.

=== Senior team ===
Bonilla made her senior debut for the Colombia national team on 12 November 2019, coming on as a late substitute for Linda Caicedo in a friendly against Argentina.

She scored her first senior international goal on 9 April 2024 in Colombia's 3–0 friendly victory over Guatemala at Hinchliffe Stadium in Paterson, New Jersey.

Bonilla was selected as an alternate player for Colombia's squad at the 2024 Summer Olympics in Paris.

On 27 February 2025, Bonilla scored in Colombia's 2–1 victory over Australia in the 2025 SheBelieves Cup at Snapdragon Stadium in San Diego. She opened the scoring before Australia equalised and Catalina Usme scored Colombia's winning goal.

Bonilla was selected for Colombia's squad at the 2025 Copa América Femenina in Ecuador. She scored in Colombia's 8–0 group-stage victory over Bolivia on 22 July, finishing after a poor clearance by the Bolivian goalkeeper. The goal came in the 56th minute and contributed to Colombia's qualification for the semi-finals.

Colombia defeated Argentina in the semi-final on penalties to reach the final. Bonilla converted her penalty in the shoot-out, joining Catalina Usme, Jorelyn Carabalí, Manuela Paví and Linda Caicedo among Colombia's successful takers.

In the final against Brazil, Bonilla scored during the shoot-out, but Brazil won the title 5–4 on penalties after the match finished 4–4 following extra time. Colombia therefore finished runners-up, while Bonilla ended the tournament with a goal in open play and successful penalties in both the semi-final and final shoot-outs.

== International goals ==
No.	Date	Venue	Opponent	Score	Result	Competition
1	9 April 2024	Hinchliffe Stadium, Paterson, United States	Guatemala	1–0	3–0	Friendly
2	26 February 2025	Snapdragon Stadium, San Diego, United States	Australia	1–0	2–1	2025 SheBelieves Cup
3	22 July 2025	Estadio Gonzalo Pozo Ripalda, Quito, Ecuador	Bolivia	1–0	8–0	2025 Copa América Femenina
