= Florencia Bonsegundo =

Argentine footballer (born 1993)

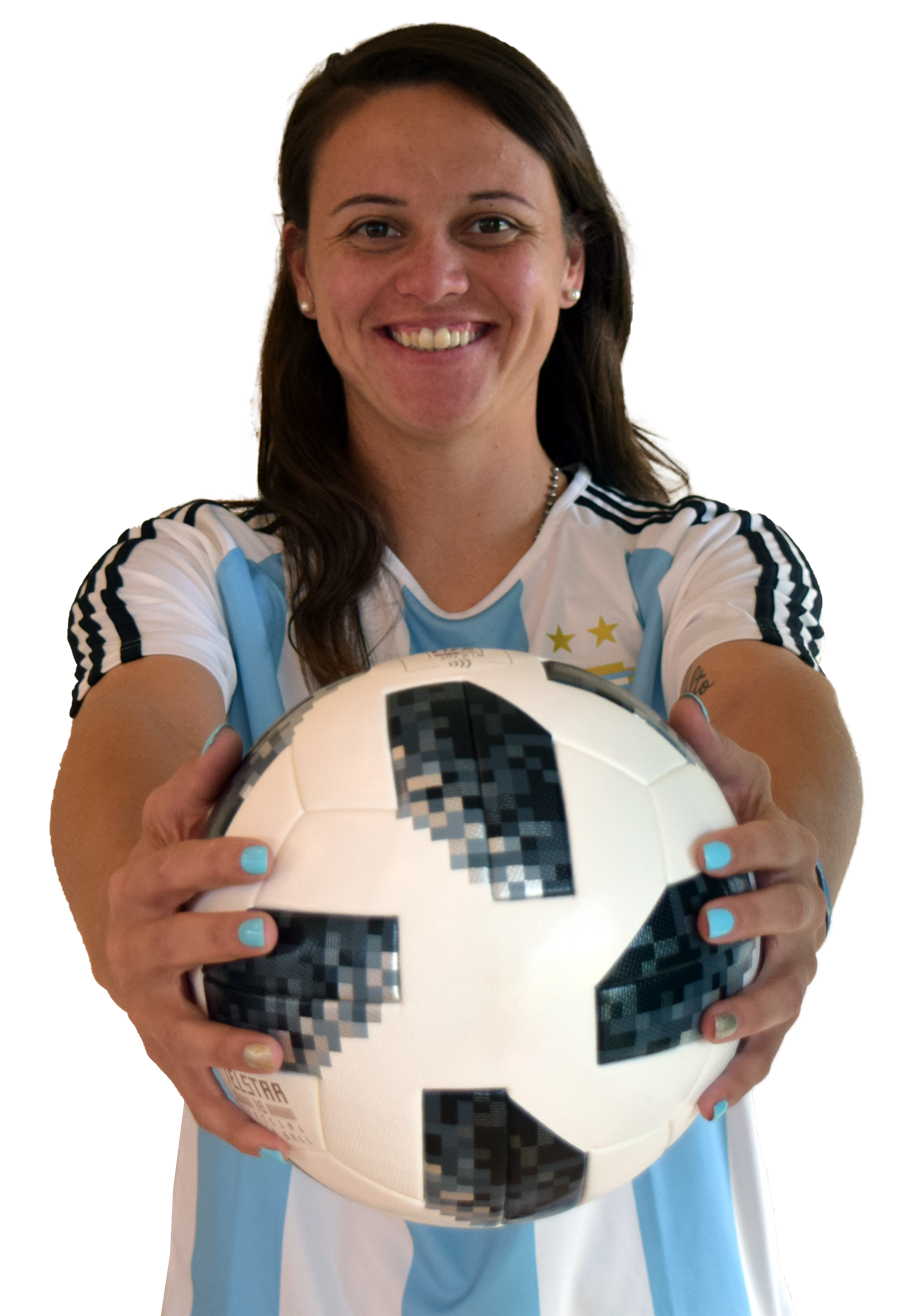

Personal information
- Full name: María Florencia Bonsegundo
- Date of birth: 14 July 1993 (age 33)
- Place of birth: Morteros, Córdoba, Argentina
- Height: 1.68 m (5 ft 6 in)
- Position: Midfielder

Team information
- Current team: Sporting CP
- Number: 19

Senior career*
| Years | Team | Apps | (Gls) |
| 2011–2012 | Huracán | | |
| 2013–2018 | UAI Urquiza | | |
| 2018–2019 | Sporting Huelva | 29 | (5) |
| 2019–2021 | Valencia | 42 | (4) |
| 2021–2025 | Madrid CFF | 49 | (6) |
| 2025– | Sporting CP | 0 | (0) |

International career^{‡}
| 2012 | Argentina U20 | 5 | (4) |
| 2014– | Argentina | 85 | (28) |
Medal record
Women's football
Representing Argentina
South American Games
| Gold medal – first place | 2014 Santiago | Team |
Copa América Femenina
| Third place | 2018 Chile |
| Third place | 2022 Colombia |
| Third place | 2025 Ecuador |
- * Club domestic league appearances and goals as of 26 February 2023 ‡ National team caps and goals as of 13 October 2026

María Florencia "Flor" Bonsegundo (born 14 July 1993), known as Florencia Bonsegundo, is an Argentine professional footballer who plays as a midfielder for Portuguese Campeonato Nacional Feminino club Sporting CP and the Argentina women's national team.

== Club career ==
Bonsegundo played in the Spanish Primera División for Sporting de Huelva between 2018 and 2019.

== International career ==
Bonsegundo represented Argentina at the 2012 FIFA U-20 Women's World Cup. At senior level, she played two Copa América Femenina editions (2014 and 2018), scoring two goals in the first and three in the latter, and the 2015 Pan American Games. (Note: 2015 Pan American Games matches are not recognised by FIFA.) At 2019 Women's World Cup, she scored the final goal of a 3–3 tie with Scotland.

== Career statistics ==
=== International ===
As of match played 13 October 2026

Appearances and goals by national team and year
| National team | Year | Apps | Goals |
|---|---|---|---|
| Argentina | 2014 | 14 | 2 |
| Argentina | 2015 | 3 | 1 |
| Argentina | 2017 | 3 | 2 |
| Argentina | 2018 | 11 | 5 |
| Argentina | 2019 | 7 | 2 |
| Argentina | 2021 | 5 | 2 |
| Argentina | 2022 | 13 | 3 |
| Argentina | 2023 | 9 | 2 |
| Argentina | 2025 | 11 | 5 |
| Argentina | 2026 | 9 | 4 |
| Total | | 85 | 28 |

=== International goals ===
Scores and results list Argentina's goal tally first

| No. | Date | Venue | Opponent | Score | Result | Competition |
|---|---|---|---|---|---|---|
| 1 | 14 September 2014 | Estadio Bellavista, Ambato, Ecuador | Bolivia | 2–0 | 6–0 | 2014 Copa América Femenina |
| 2 | 28 September 2014 | Estadio Olímpico Atahualpa, Quito, Ecuador | Ecuador | 2–0 | 2–3 | 2014 Copa América Femenina |
| 3 | 14 July 2015 | Hamilton Pan Am Soccer Stadium, Hamilton, Canada | Mexico | 1–3 | 1–3 | 2015 Pan American Games |
| 4 | 30 August 2017 | Estadio Luis Franzini, Montevideo, Uruguay | Uruguay | 1–0 | 3–0 | Friendly |
| 5 | 30 August 2017 | Estadio Luis Franzini, Montevideo, Uruguay | Uruguay | 2–0 | 3–0 | Friendly |
| 6 | 9 April 2018 | Estadio Municipal Francisco Sánchez Rumoroso, Coquimbo, Chile | Ecuador | 5–2 | 6–3 | 2018 Copa América Femenina |
| 7 | 9 April 2018 | Estadio Municipal Francisco Sánchez Rumoroso, Coquimbo, Chile | Ecuador | 6–3 | 6–3 | 2018 Copa América Femenina |
| 8 | 16 April 2018 | Estadio La Portada, Coquimbo, Chile | Colombia | 1–1 | 3–1 | 2018 Copa América Femenina |
| 9 | 2 October 2018 | Complejo Celeste, Barros Blancos, Uruguay | Uruguay | 3–0 | 3–1 | Friendly |
| 10 | 13 November 2018 | Estadio Rommel Fernández, Panama City, Panama | Panama | 1–1 | 1–1 | 2019 FIFA Women's World Cup qualification |
| 11 | 23 May 2019 | Estadio Provincial Juan Gilberto Funes, La Punta, Argentina | Uruguay | 1–0 | 3–1 | Friendly |
| 12 | 19 June 2019 | Parc des Princes, Paris, France | Scotland | 3–3 | 3–3 | 2019 FIFA Women's World Cup |
| 13 | 17 September 2021 | Amigão, Campina Grande, Brazil | Brazil | 1–3 | 1–3 | Friendly |
| 14 | 23 October 2021 | Estadio Gregorio "Tepa" Gómez, Tepatitlán, Mexico | Mexico | 1–0 | 1–6 | Friendly |
| 15 | 12 July 2022 | Estadio Centenario, Armenia, Colombia | Peru | 2–0 | 4–0 | 2022 Copa América Femenina |
| 16 | 21 July 2022 | Estadio Centenario, Armenia, Colombia | Venezuela | 1–0 | 1–0 | 2022 Copa América Femenina |
| 17 | 29 July 2022 | Estadio Centenario, Armenia, Colombia | Paraguay | 2–1 | 3–1 | 2022 Copa América Femenina |
| 18 | 17 February 2023 | North Harbour Stadium, Auckland, New Zealand | Chile | 4–0 | 4–0 | Friendly |
| 19 | 9 April 2023 | Estadio Carlos Augusto Mercado Luna, La Rioja, Argentina | Venezuela | 2–0 | 3–0 | Friendly |
| 20 | 15 July 2025 | Estadio Banco Guayaquil, Quito, Ecuador | Uruguay | 1–0 | 1–0 | 2025 Copa América Femenina |
| 21 | 24 July 2025 | Estadio Banco Guayaquil, Quito, Ecuador | Ecuador | 2–0 | 2–0 | 2025 Copa América Femenina |
| 22 | 1 August 2025 | Estadio Rodrigo Paz Delgado, Quito, Ecuador | Uruguay | 2–2 | 2–2 (5–4 p) | 2025 Copa América Femenina |
| 23 | 2 December 2025 | Estadio Florencio Sola, Banfield, Argentina | Bolivia | 3–0 | 8–0 | 2025–26 CONMEBOL Women's Nations League |
| 24 | 2 December 2025 | Estadio Florencio Sola, Banfield, Argentina | Bolivia | 8–0 | 8–0 | 2025–26 CONMEBOL Women's Nations League |
| 25 | 10 April 2026 | Estadio Elías Figueroa Brander, Valparaíso, Chile | Chile | 1–0 | 1–0 | 2025–26 CONMEBOL Women's Nations League |
| 26 | 14 April 2026 | Estadio Metropolitano de Cabudare, Cabudare, Venezuela | Venezuela | 2–0 | 2–1 | 2025–26 CONMEBOL Women's Nations League |
| 27 | 9 June 2026 | Estadio Olímpico Atahualpa, Quito, Ecuador | Ecuador | 1–0 | 1–0 | 2025–26 CONMEBOL Women's Nations League |
| 28 | 13 October 2026 | Arena Pernambuco, São Lourenço da Mata, Brazil | Brazil | 2–2 | 2–2 | Friendly |

== Personal life ==
Bonsegundo also holds Spanish citizenship, her full name in that document being María Florencia Bonsegundo Foces (Note: In this Spanish name, the first or paternal surname is Bonsegundo and the second or maternal family name is Foces.).
