= Sofía Olivera =

Uruguayan footballer (born 1991)

Personal information
- Full name: Sofía Victoria Olivera Trakimas
- Date of birth: 14 August 1991 (age 35)
- Place of birth: Montevideo, Uruguay
- Height: 1.66 m (5 ft 5 1/2 in)
- Position: Goalkeeper

Team information
- Current team: UAI Urquiza

Senior career*
Years	Team	Apps	(Gls)
–2008	Rampla Juniors		
2008–2015	Cerro	15	(3)
2016–2021	Peñarol	80	(0)
2014–2017	Río Negro City (futsal)	29	(12)
2018–2021	Peñarol (futsal)	31	(13)
2021	Rosario Central		
2022–2024	UAI Urquiza	43	(0)
2024–2025	Belgrano	0	(0)
2025-	Gimnasia y Esgrima (LP)	0	(0)

International career^{‡}
2018–	Uruguay	21	(0)
- * Club domestic league appearances and goals ‡ National team caps and goals as of 16 May 2025

Sofía Victoria Olivera Trakimas (born 14 August 1991) is a Uruguayan footballer who plays as a goalkeeper for Argentine club UAI Urquiza and the Uruguay women's national team.
