= Estadio Banco Guayaquil =

Football stadium in Quito, Ecuador

- Estadio Independiente del Valle
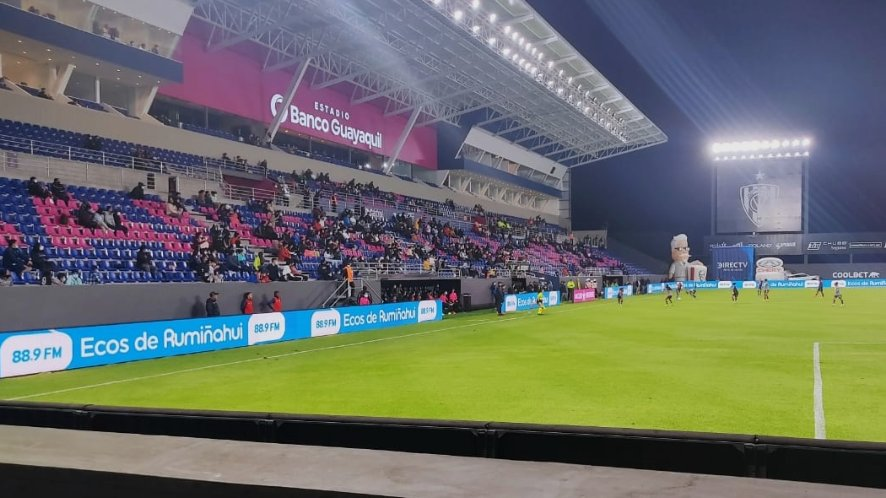
- Interactive map of Estadio Banco Guayaquil
- Full name: Estadio Banco Guayaquil
- Location: Quito, Ecuador
- Coordinates: 0°20′57″S 78°28′14″W
- Owner: Independiente del Valle
- Operator: Independiente del Valle
- Capacity: 12,000; 11,030 (international)
- Surface: Grass

Construction
- Built: October 2020 – 2021
- Opened: 20 March 2021
- Cost: US$ 12 million

Tenants
- Independiente del Valle (2021–present); Independiente Juniors (2021–present); Independiente del Valle Femenino (2022–present)

Estadio Banco Guayaquil, sometimes known as Estadio Independiente del Valle, is a football stadium in Quito, Ecuador. It is currently used at club level by owner Independiente del Valle and their reserve team Independiente Juniors. The stadium has a capacity of 12,000 spectators.

== History ==
Independiente del Valle's project to build a stadium was revealed by his general manager Santiago Morales in October 2019. The construction of the stadium started in October 2020, and the club presented the name of the stadium on 18 February 2021, after being sponsored by Banco Guayaquil.

The stadium's first match occurred on 20 March 2021, as IDV faced Delfín, with Lorenzo Faravelli scoring its first goal as the match ended 2–0 for the hosts. The lights were installed in June, with the stadium hosting matches of CONMEBOL competitions shortly after.
