= Estadio Gonzalo Pozo Ripalda =

Stadium in Quito, Ecuador

- Estadio Chillogallo / La Caldera del Sur.
- Interactive map of Estadio Gonzalo Pozo Ripalda
- Former names: Estadio Chillogallo
- Location: Quito, Ecuador
- Coordinates: title 00°16′44″S 78°32′46″W
- Capacity: 18,799
- Surface: Grass
- Field size: 108 x 70 m

Construction
- Groundbreaking: 1987
- Built: 1987–1991
- Opened: February 19, 1994

Tenant
- Aucas: 1994–present

Estadio Gonzalo Pozo Ripalda is a multi-use stadium in southern Quito, Ecuador. It is currently used mostly for football matches and is the home stadium of Aucas. The stadium, which holds 18,799 spectators, was built in 1987 and opened in 1994.

British Heavy Metal band Iron Maiden performed in the stadium as part of their Somewhere Back in Time World Tour on March 10, 2009.

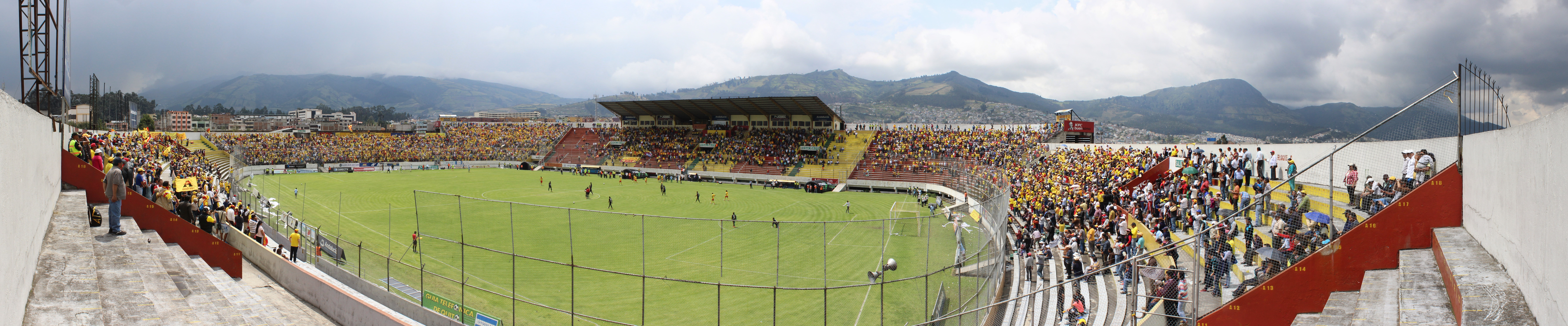
Panoramic view of the stadium (2014)
