= 2025 Copa América Femenina Group B =

Association football championship group

The 2025 Copa América Femenina Group B was the first of two sets in the group stage of the 2025 Copa América Femenina that took place from 11 July 2025 to 2 August 2025. The group competition consisted of Brazil, Colombia, Paraguay, Venezuela, and Bolivia.

The top two teams automatically qualified for the top four knockout stage, while third place moved on to a fifth place match against the third-place finisher of Group B. In the knockout stage, the two finalists qualified to the 2028 Summer Olympics and the third and fourth classified (semifinalists) and the fifth (after playing the final duel) will get three places for the 2027 Pan American Games tournament in Lima (in addition to Peru that qualified automatically as hosts). Otherwise, the fourth and fifth classified are was eliminated.

== Teams ==
Draw position	Team	Pot	Finals appearance	Previous best performance	FIFA Rankings
B1	Brazil	Seed	10th	Champions (1991, 1995, 1998, 2003, 2010, 2014, 2018, 2022)	4
B2	Colombia	1	8th	Runners-up (2010, 2014, 2022)	18
B3	Paraguay	2	8th	Fourth place (2006, 2022)	45
B4	Venezuela	3	9th	Third place (1991)	48
B5	Bolivia	4	9th	Fifth place (1995)	105

== Standings ==
Pos	Team	Pld	W	D	L	GF	GA	GD	Pts	Qualification
1	Brazil	4	3	1	0	12	1	+11	10	Advance to semi-finals
2	Colombia	4	2	2	0	12	1	+11	8	Advance to semi-finals
3	Paraguay	4	2	0	2	8	9	−1	6	Advance to fifth place match
4	Venezuela	4	1	1	2	8	5	+3	4	
5	Bolivia	4	0	0	4	1	25	−24	0	

Source: CONMEBOL
Rules for classification: Group stage tiebreakers

== Matches ==
=== Bolivia vs Paraguay ===
13 July 2025
16:00

Bolivia	0–4	Paraguay
	Report (WEB) Report (CONMEBOL)	C. Martínez 23', 40', 61'; Chamorro 90+3'

Estadio Gonzalo Pozo Ripalda, Quito
Referee: Marcelly Zambrano (Ecuador)

Bolivia	Paraguay

GK	1	Jodi Liliana Medina
DF	2	Eyda Serrudo	(substituted off) 65'
DF	4	Lucerito Bravo
DF	5	Érika Salvatierra (c)
DF	3	Aide Mendiola
MF	15	Angelina Rivero
MF	7	Samantha Alurralde	(substituted off) 56'
MF	6	Yaneth Viveros	(substituted off) 85'
FW	14	Ana Paula Rojas
FW	10	Abigail Quiroz
FW	11	Emilie Doerksen
Substitutes:
GK	12	Hillary Saavedra
GK	23	Erika Sánchez
DF	20	María José Bravo
DF	21	Jaise Fernanda Nina
MF	8	Ángela Cárdenas
MF	16	Anabel Flores	(substituted in) 85'
MF	18	Nelly Carballo	(substituted in) 56'
MF	22	Alison Belén Mamani
FW	9	Marlene Flores Segovia	(substituted in) 65'
FW	13	Maya Siles
FW	17	Briseyda Orellana Rocha
FW	19	Carla Méndez
Manager:
(Argentina) Rosana Gómez

GK	12	Soledad Belotto
DF	4	Deisy Ojeda
DF	5	Dahiana Bogarín
DF	13	María Martínez	(substituted off) 78'
MF	3	Daysy Bareiro	(substituted off) 66'
MF	8	Celeste Aguilera
MF	6	Fanny Godoy	(substituted off) 66'
MF	23	Liz Baretto	(substituted off) 66'
FW	11	Fátima Acosta	(substituted off) 78'
FW	9	Lice Chamorro (c)
FW	18	Claudia Martínez
Substitutes:
GK	1	Cristina Recalde
GK	22	Araceli Legüizamón
DF	2	Camila Barbosa	(substituted in) 78'
DF	14	Naomi de León
DF	16	Fiorela Martínez
DF	17	Camila Arrieta	(substituted in) 66'
MF	15	Danna Garcete
MF	19	Antonia Riveros	(substituted in) 78'
MF	20	Diana Benítez	(substituted in) 66'
FW	7	Ramona Martínez
FW	10	Jessica Martínez
FW	21	Cindy Ramos	(substituted in) 66'
Manager:
(Brazil) Fábio Fukumoto

Player of the match:
Claudia Martínez (Paraguay)

Assistant referees:
Mónica Amboya (Ecuador)
Viviana Segura (Ecuador)
Fourth official:
Anahí Fernández (Uruguay)

=== Brazil vs Venezuela ===
13 July 2025
19:00

Brazil	2–0	Venezuela
Amanda Gutierres 32'; Duda Sampaio 88'	Report (WEB) Report (CONMEBOL)

Estadio Gonzalo Pozo Ripalda, Quito
Referee: Milagros Arruela (Peru)

Brazil	Venezuela

GK	1	Lorena
DF	2	Antônia
DF	23	Isa Haas
DF	13	Fe Palermo	(yellow card) 28'	(substituted off) 59'
MF	18	Gabi Portilho	(yellow card) 45'	(substituted off) 59'
MF	8	Angelina
MF	5	Duda Sampaio
MF	6	Yasmim		(substituted off) 59'
MF	10	Marta (c)		(substituted off) 74'
FW	9	Amanda Gutierres
FW	11	Gio Garbelini		(substituted off) 90+1'
Substitutes:
GK	12	Camila Rodrigues
GK	14	Cláudia
DF	3	Tarciane		(substituted in) 59'
DF	4	Kaká
DF	16	Fátima Dutra		(substituted in) 59'
DF	20	Mariza
MF	15	Ary Borges		(substituted in) 90+1'
MF	17	Vitória Yaya
FW	7	Kerolin
FW	19	Jhonson
FW	21	Dudinha		(substituted in) 74'
FW	22	Luany		(substituted in) 59'
Manager:
(Brazil) Arthur Elias

GK	13	Nayluisa Cáceres (c)
DF	6	Michelle Romero
DF	2	Verónica Herrera
DF	5	Yenifer Giménez
DF	14	Raiderlin Carrasco
MF	20	Dayana Rodríguez
MF	7	Daniuska Rodríguez	(substituted off) 71'
MF	21	Bárbara Olivieri	(substituted off) 84'
MF	8	Gabriela García
MF	19	Mariana Speckmaier	(substituted off) 71'
FW	9	Deyna Castellanos	(substituted off) 83'
Substitutes:
GK	1	Micheel Rengifo
GK	22	Valeria Rebanales
DF	3	Gabriela Angulo
DF	4	María Peraza
DF	17	Camila Pescatore
MF	12	Ailing Herrera
MF	15	Yerliane Moreno	(substituted in) 84'
MF	16	Floriangel Apóstol
MF	23	Melanie Chirinos
FW	10	Joemar Guarecuco	(substituted in) 71'
FW	11	Oriana Altuve	(substituted in) 83'
FW	18	Ysaura Viso	(substituted in) 71'
Manager:
(Brazil) Ricardo Belli

Player of the match:
Gio Garbelini (Brazil)

Assistant referees:
Mariana Aquino (Peru)
Vera Yupanqui (Peru)
Fourth official:
Roberta Echeverría (Argentina)

=== Bolivia vs Brazil ===
16 July 2025
16:00

Bolivia	0–6	Brazil
	Report (WEB) Report (CONMEBOL)	Luany 13', 32'; Kerolin 37' (pen.), 79', 83'; Amanda Gutierres 90+5'

Estadio Gonzalo Pozo Ripalda, Quito
Referee: Roberta Echeverría (Argentina)

Bolivia	Brazil

GK	23	Érika Sánchez
DF	14	Ana Paula Rojas
DF	4	Lucerito Bravo
DF	5	Érika Salvatierra (c)
DF	2	Eyda Serrudo
DF	3	Aidé Mendiola
MF	10	Abigail Quiroz		(substituted off) 40'
MF	18	Nelly Carballo	(yellow card) 16'	(substituted off) 83'
MF	6	Yaneth Viveros		(substituted off) 77'
MF	15	Angelina Rivero	(yellow card) 57' (yellow-red card) 90+2'
FW	11	Emilie Doerksen
Substitutes:
GK	1	Jodi Medina
GK	12	Hillary Saavedra
DF	20	María José Bravo
DF	21	Jaise Nina
MF	7	Samantha Alurralde		(substituted in) 77'
MF	8	Ángela Cárdenas
MF	16	Anabel Flores	(yellow card) 51'	(substituted in) 40'
MF	22	Alison Mamani
FW	9	Marlene Flores	(yellow card) 90'	(substituted in) 83'
FW	13	Ivana Siles
FW	17	Briseyda Orellana
FW	19	Carla Méndez
Manager:
(Argentina) Rosana Gómez

GK	12	Camila Rodrigues
DF	4	Kaká		(substituted off) 65'
DF	3	Tarciane
DF	13	Fe Palermo	(yellow card) 66'	(substituted off) 66'
MF	22	Luany
MF	21	Dudinha		(substituted off) 66'
MF	17	Vitória Yaya
MF	16	Fátima Dutra		(substituted off) 75'
MF	18	Gabi Portilho	(yellow card) 57'	(substituted off) 64'
MF	15	Ary Borges
FW	7	Kerolin (c)
Substitutes:
GK	1	Lorena
GK	14	Cláudia
DF	2	Antônia
DF	6	Yasmim		(substituted in) 75'
DF	20	Mariza		(substituted in) 65'
DF	23	Isa Haas
MF	5	Duda Sampaio
MF	8	Angelina
FW	9	Amanda Gutierres		(substituted in) 66'
FW	10	Marta		(substituted in) 66'
FW	11	Gio Garbelini		(substituted in) 64'
FW	19	Jhonson
Manager:
(Brazil) Arthur Elias

Player of the match:
Luany (Brazil)

Assistant referees:
Gisela Trucco (Argentina)
Daiana Milone (Argentina)
Fourth official:
Milagros Arruela (Peru)

=== Venezuela vs Colombia ===
16 July 2025
19:00

Venezuela	0–0	Colombia
	Report (WEB) Report (CONMEBOL)

Estadio Gonzalo Pozo Ripalda, Quito
Referee: Dione Rissios (Chile)

Venezuela	Colombia

GK	13	Nayluisa Cáceres (c)
DF	6	Michelle Romero
DF	2	Verónica Herrera
DF	5	Yenifer Giménez	(yellow card) 57'	(substituted off) 82'
DF	14	Raiderlin Carrasco
MF	20	Dayana Rodríguez
MF	7	Daniuska Rodríguez	(yellow card) 55'
MF	21	Bárbara Olivieri	(yellow card) 43'
MF	8	Gabriela García
MF	19	Mariana Speckmaier		(substituted off) 68'
FW	9	Deyna Castellanos
Substitutes:
GK	1	Micheel Rengifo
GK	22	Valeria Rebanales
DF	3	Gabriela Angulo
DF	4	María Peraza
DF	17	Camila Pescatore
MF	12	Ailing Herrera
MF	15	Yerliane Moreno
MF	16	Floriangel Apóstol
MF	23	Melanie Chirinos
FW	10	Joemar Guarecuco		(substituted in) 68'
FW	11	Oriana Altuve
FW	18	Ysaura Viso		(substituted in) 82'
Manager:
(Brazil) Ricardo Belli

GK	12	Katherine Tapia
DF	17	Carolin Arias (c)
DF	3	Daniela Arias
DF	16	Jorelyn Carabalí
DF	5	Lorena Bedoya
MF	9	Mayra Ramírez	(yellow card) 75'	(substituted off) 76'
MF	7	Manuela Paví
MF	20	Ilana Izquierdo
FW	22	Daniela Caracas		(substituted off) 70'
FW	18	Linda Caicedo		(substituted off) 87'
FW	10	Leicy Santos
Substitutes:
GK	1	Catalina Pérez
GK	13	Luisa Agudelo
DF	2	Mary Álvarez
DF	4	Ana María Guzmán
DF	14	Ángela Barón
DF	19	Yirleidis Minota		(substituted off) 70'
MF	6	Daniela Montoya
MF	8	Marcela Restrepo
FW	11	Catalina Usme
FW	15	Wendy Bonilla	(yellow card) 90'	(substituted in) 87'
FW	21	Valerin Loboa		(substituted off) 76'
FW	23	Liced Serna
Manager:
(Colombia) Ángelo Marsiglia

Player of the match:
Daniuska Rodríguez (Venezuela)

Assistant referees:
Marcia Castillo (Chile)
Leslie Vásquez (Chile)
Fourth official:
Marcelly Zambrano (Ecuador)

=== Venezuela vs Bolivia ===
19 July 2025
16:00

Venezuela	7–1	Bolivia
Altuve 13', 58', 61'; García 24'; Guarecuco 29'; Chirinos 48'; Carrasco 69'	Report (WEB) Report (CONMEBOL)	Doerksen 18'

Estadio Gonzalo Pozo Ripalda, Quito
Referee: Ivana Projkovska (North Macedonia)

Venezuela	Bolivia

GK	13	Nayluisa Cáceres (c)
DF	6	Michelle Romero
DF	2	Verónica Herrera		(substituted off) 45'
DF	4	María Peraza
DF	14	Raiderlin Carrasco		(substituted off) 75'
MF	9	Deyna Castellanos
MF	15	Yerliane Moreno		(substituted off) 45'
MF	8	Gabriela García
MF	18	Ysaura Viso		(substituted off) 63'
FW	10	Joemar Guarecuco	(yellow card) 6'	(substituted off) 63'
FW	11	Oriana Altuve
Substitutes:
GK	1	Micheel Rengifo
GK	22	Valeria Rebanales
DF	3	Gabriela Angulo
DF	5	Yenifer Giménez
DF	17	Camila Pescatore
MF	7	Daniuska Rodríguez		(substituted in) 45'
MF	12	Ailing Herrera		(substituted in) 63'
MF	16	Floriangel Apóstol		(substituted in) 63'
MF	20	Dayana Rodríguez
MF	23	Melanie Chirinos		(substituted in) 45'
FW	19	Mariana Speckmaier	(yellow card) 83'	(substituted in) 75'
FW	21	Bárbara Olivieri
Manager:
(Brazil) Ricardo Belli

GK	1	Jodi Medina
DF	14	Ana Paula Rojas
DF	4	Lucerito Bravo	(yellow card) 25'
DF	5	Érika Salvatierra
DF	3	Aidé Mendiola		(substituted off) 86'
MF	7	Samantha Alurralde		(substituted off) 86'
MF	18	Nelly Carballo		(substituted off) 62'
MF	6	Yaneth Viveros (c)
FW	11	Emilie Doerksen
FW	9	Marlene Flores		(substituted off) 45'
FW	19	Carla Méndez
Substitutes:
GK	12	Hillary Saavedra
GK	23	Érika Sánchez
DF	2	Eyda Serrudo		(substituted in) 86'
DF	20	María José Bravo		(substituted in) 86'
DF	21	Jaise Nina
MF	8	Ángela Cárdenas
MF	10	Abigail Quiroz	(substituted in) 45'	(substituted off) 86'
MF	15	Angelina Rivero
MF	16	Anabel Flores		(substituted in) 62'
MF	22	Alison Mamani
FW	13	Ivana Siles		(substituted in) 86'
FW	17	Briseyda Orellana
Manager:
(Argentina) Rosana Gómez

Player of the match:
Oriana Altuve (Venezuela)

Assistant referees:
Giulia Tempestilli (Italy)
Iragartze Fernández (Spain)
Fourth official:
Marcelly Zambrano (Ecuador)

=== Colombia vs Paraguay ===
19 July 2025
19:00

Colombia	4–1	Paraguay
Caicedo 13', 83'; Ramírez 57'; Santos 90+4'	Report (WEB) Report (CONMEBOL)	C. Martínez 15'

Estadio Gonzalo Pozo Ripalda, Quito
Referee: Anahí Fernández (Uruguay)

Colombia	Paraguay

GK	12	Katherine Tapia
DF	17	Carolina Arias (c)	(substituted off) 62'
DF	3	Daniela Arias
DF	16	Jorelyn Carabalí
DF	22	Daniela Caracas
MF	10	Leicy Santos
MF	5	Lorena Bedoya
MF	20	Ilana Izquierdo	(substituted off) 90'
FW	9	Mayra Ramírez	(substituted off) 90'
FW	7	Manuela Paví	(substituted off) 45'
FW	18	Linda Caicedo	(substituted off) 90'
Substitutes:
GK	1	Catalina Pérez
GK	13	Luisa Agudelo
DF	2	Mary Álvarez
DF	4	Ana María Guzmán	(substituted in) 62'
DF	14	Ángela Barón
DF	19	Yirleidis Minota
MF	6	Daniela Montoya
MF	8	Marcela Restrepo
FW	11	Catalina Usme	(substituted in) 45'
FW	15	Wendy Bonilla	(substituted in) 90'
FW	21	Valerin Loboa	(substituted in) 90'
FW	23	Liced Serna	(substituted in) 90'
Manager:
(Colombia) Ángelo Marsiglia

GK	12	Soledad Belotto
DF	13	María Martínez
DF	5	Dahiana Bogarín
DF	4	Deisy Ojeda
MF	23	Liz Baretto		(substituted off) 71'
MF	6	Fanny Godoy	(yellow card) 31'	(substituted off) 61'
MF	8	Celeste Aguilera
MF	17	Camila Arrieta
FW	9	Lice Chamorro (c)
FW	21	Cindy Ramos		(substituted off) 61'
FW	18	Claudia Martínez
Substitutes:
GK	1	Cristina Recalde
GK	22	Araceli Legüizamón
DF	2	Camila Barbosa
DF	3	Daysy Bareiro
DF	14	Naomi de León
DF	16	Fiorela Martínez
MF	15	Danna Garcete		(substituted in) 61'
MF	19	Antonia Riveros
MF	20	Diana Benítez
FW	7	Ramona Martínez		(substituted in) 71'
FW	10	Jessica Martínez
FW	11	Fátima Acosta		(substituted in) 61'
Manager:
(Brazil) Fábio Fukumoto

Player of the match:
Linda Caicedo (Colombia)

Assistant referees:
Belén Clavijo (Uruguay)
Daiana Fernández (Uruguay)
Fourth official:
Dione Rissios (Chile)

=== Colombia vs Bolivia ===
22 July 2025
16:00

Colombia	8–0	Bolivia
Montoya 9', 33'; Ramírez 13'; A. Flores 37' (o.g.); Caicedo 43'; Bonilla 56'; Carabalí 70'; Loboa 90+3'	Report (WEB) Report (CONMEBOL)

Estadio Gonzalo Pozo Ripalda, Quito
Referee: Marcelly Zambrano (Ecuador)

Colombia	Bolivia

GK	12	Katherine Tapia
DF	16	Jorelyn Carabalí
DF	3	Daniela Arias	(yellow card) 49'	(substituted off) 71'
DF	2	Mary Álvarez
MF	15	Wendy Bonilla
MF	5	Lorena Bedoya		(substituted off) 45'
MF	6	Daniela Montoya (c)
MF	18	Linda Caicedo		(substituted off) 45'
MF	10	Leicy Santos		(substituted off) 64'
FW	9	Mayra Ramírez		(substituted off) 64'
FW	11	Catalina Usme
Substitutes:
GK	1	Catalina Pérez
GK	13	Luisa Agudelo
DF	4	Ana María Guzmán		(substituted in) 45'
DF	14	Ángela Barón		(substituted in) 71'
DF	17	Carolina Arias
DF	19	Yirleidis Minota
DF	22	Daniela Caracas
MF	8	Marcela Restrepo		(substituted in) 45'
MF	20	Ilana Izquierdo
FW	7	Manuela Paví
FW	21	Valerin Loboa		(substituted in) 64'
FW	23	Liced Serna		(substituted in) 64'
Manager:
(Colombia) Ángelo Marsiglia

GK	23	Érika Sánchez
DF	2	Eyda Serrudo	(substituted off) 45'
DF	4	Lucerito Bravo
DF	7	Samantha Alurralde	(substituted off) 45'
MF	14	Ana Paula Rojas
MF	16	Anabel Flores	(substituted off) 70'
MF	15	Angelina Rivero
MF	3	Aidé Mendiola (c)
FW	18	Nelly Carballo
FW	19	Carla Méndez
FW	11	Emilie Doerksen
Substitutes:
GK	1	Jodi Medina
GK	12	Hillary Saavedra
DF	5	Érika Salvatierra
DF	20	María José Bravo	(substituted in) 45'
DF	21	Jaise Nina
MF	6	Yaneth Viveros
MF	8	Ángela Cárdenas
MF	10	Abigail Quiroz
MF	22	Alison Mamani
FW	9	Marlene Flores	(substituted in) 70'
FW	13	Ivana Siles	(substituted in) 45'
FW	17	Briseyda Orellana
Manager:
(Argentina) Rosana Gómez

Player of the match:
Mayra Ramírez (Colombia)

Assistant referees:
Mónica Amboya (Ecuador)
Viviana Segura (Ecuador)
Fourth official:
Roberta Echeverría (Argentina)

=== Paraguay vs Brazil ===
22 July 2025
19:00

Paraguay	1–4	Brazil
C. Martínez 65'	Report (WEB) Report (CONMEBOL)	Yasmim 27', 39'; Amanda Gutierres 60'; Duda Sampaio 75'

Estadio Gonzalo Pozo Ripalda, Quito
Referee: Dione Rissios (Chile)

Paraguay	Brazil

GK	12	Soledad Belotto
DF	2	Camila Barbosa
DF	5	Dahiana Bogarín
DF	16	Fiorela Martínez		(substituted off) 76'
MF	23	Liz Baretto		(substituted off) 86'
MF	21	Cindy Ramos
MF	15	Danna Garcete
MF	17	Camila Arrieta	(yellow card) 35' (yellow-red card) 50'
FW	9	Lice Chamorro (c)		(substituted off) 76'
FW	19	Antonia Riveros		(substituted off) 54'
FW	18	Claudia Martínez		(substituted off) 76'
Substitutes:
GK	1	Cristina Recalde
GK	22	Araceli Legüizamón
DF	3	Daysy Bareiro		(substituted in) 54'
DF	4	Deisy Ojeda		(substituted in) 76'
DF	13	María Martínez
DF	14	Naomi de León		(substituted in) 86'
MF	6	Fanny Godoy
MF	8	Celeste Aguilera
MF	20	Diana Benítez		(substituted in) 76'
FW	7	Ramona Martínez
FW	10	Jessica Martínez
FW	11	Fátima Acosta		(substituted in) 76'
Manager:
(Brazil) Fábio Fukumoto

GK	1	Lorena
DF	2	Antônia
DF	23	Isa Haas	(yellow card) 43'
DF	20	Mariza		(substituted off) 79'
MF	22	Luany
MF	7	Kerolin		(substituted off) 45'
MF	5	Duda Sampaio
MF	6	Yasmim		(substituted off) 45'
MF	10	Marta (c)		(substituted off) 65'
FW	9	Amanda Gutierres
FW	11	Gio Garbelini		(substituted off) 65'
Substitutes:
GK	12	Camila Rodrigues
GK	14	Cláudia
DF	3	Tarciane
DF	4	Kaká		(substituted in) 79'
DF	13	Fe Palermo
DF	16	Fátima Dutra		(substituted in) 45'
MF	8	Angelina		(substituted in) 45'
MF	15	Ary Borges
MF	17	Vitória Yaya
FW	18	Gabi Portilho
FW	19	Jhonson	(yellow card) 87'	(substituted in) 65'
FW	21	Dudinha		(substituted in) 65'
Manager:
(Brazil) Arthur Elias

Player of the match:
Duda Sampaio (Brazil)

Assistant referees:
Marcia Castillo (Chile)
Leslie Vásquez (Chile)
Fourth official:
Anahí Fernández (Uruguay)

=== Brazil vs Colombia ===
25 July 2025
19:00

Brazil	0–0	Colombia
	Report (WEB) Report (CONMEBOL)

Estadio Banco Guayaquil, Quito
Referee: Milagros Arruela (Peru)

Brazil	Colombia

GK	1	Lorena	(red card) 24'
DF	13	Fe Palermo
DF	3	Tarciane
DF	20	Mariza
MF	18	Gabi Portilho
MF	15	Ary Borges	(yellow card) 62'	(substituted off) 67'
MF	8	Angelina (c)		(substituted off) 80'
MF	6	Yasmim
MF	19	Jhonson		(substituted off) 28'
FW	7	Kerolin	(yellow card) 37'	(substituted off) 67'
FW	21	Dudinha		(substituted off) 79'
Substitutes:
GK	12	Camila Rodrigues
GK	14	Cláudia		(substituted in) 28'
DF	2	Antônia
DF	4	Kaká
DF	16	Fátima Dutra
DF	23	Isa Haas
MF	5	Duda Sampaio		(substituted in) 67'
MF	17	Vitória Yaya		(substituted in) 80'
FW	9	Amanda Gutierres
FW	10	Marta		(substituted in) 79'
FW	11	Gio Garbelini		(substituted in) 67'
FW	22	Luany
Manager:
(Brazil) Arthur Elias

GK	12	Katherine Tapia
DF	17	Carolina Arias (c)
DF	3	Daniela Arias		(substituted off) 72'
DF	16	Jorelyn Carabalí
DF	22	Daniela Caracas
MF	10	Leicy Santos		(substituted off) 63'
MF	5	Lorena Bedoya
MF	20	Ilana Izquierdo	(yellow card) 31'	(substituted off) 72'
FW	21	Valerin Loboa
FW	9	Mayra Ramírez		(substituted off) 63'
FW	18	Linda Caicedo
Substitutes:
GK	1	Catalina Pérez
GK	13	Luisa Agudelo
DF	2	Mary Álvarez		(substituted in) 73'
DF	4	Ana María Guzmán
DF	14	Ángela Barón
DF	19	Yirleidis Minota
MF	6	Daniela Montoya		(substituted in) 73'
MF	8	Marcela Restrepo
MF	11	Catalina Usme		(substituted in) 63'
FW	7	Manuela Paví		(substituted in) 63'
FW	15	Wendy Bonilla
FW	23	Liced Serna
Manager:
(Colombia) Ángelo Marsiglia

Player of the match:
Valerin Loboa (Colombia)

Assistant referees:
Mariana Aquino (Peru)
Vera Yupanqui (Peru)
Fourth official:
Dione Rissios (Chile)

=== Paraguay vs Venezuela ===
25 July 2025
19:00

Paraguay	2–1	Venezuela
Acosta 64'; C. Martínez 84'	Report (WEB) Report (CONMEBOL)	Altuve 40'

Estadio Gonzalo Pozo Ripalda, Quito
Referee: Anahí Fernández (Uruguay)

Paraguay	Venezuela

GK	12	Soledad Belotto
DF	2	Camila Barbosa		(substituted off) 45'
DF	5	Dahiana Bogarín
DF	4	Deisy Ojeda		(substituted off) 71'
MF	7	Ramona Martínez		(substituted off) 78'
MF	8	Celeste Aguilera
MF	15	Danna Garcete		(substituted off) 55'
MF	3	Daysy Bareiro	(yellow card) 50'
FW	21	Cindy Ramos		(substituted off) 78'
FW	9	Lice Chamorro (c)
FW	18	Claudia Martínez
Substitutes:
GK	1	Cristina Recalde
GK	22	Araceli Legüizamón
DF	3	Daysy Bareiro
DF	13	María Martínez
DF	14	Naomi de León		(substituted in) 45'
DF	16	Fiorela Martínez		(substituted in) 71'
DF	23	Liz Barreto
MF	6	Fanny Godoy		(substituted in) 78'
MF	19	Belén Riveros
MF	20	Diana Benítez
FW	10	Jessica Martínez		(substituted in) 78'
FW	11	Fátima Acosta		(substituted in) 55'
Manager:
(Brazil) Fábio Fukumoto

GK	13	Nayluisa Cáceres (c)
DF	6	Michelle Romero
DF	2	Verónica Herrera
DF	5	Yenifer Giménez		(substituted off) 60'
DF	14	Raiderlin Carrasco	(yellow card) 41'	(substituted off) 45'
MF	20	Dayana Rodríguez	(red card) 45+2'
MF	8	Gabriela García
MF	7	Daniuska Rodríguez		(substituted off) 60'
FW	9	Deyna Castellanos		(substituted off) 72'
FW	11	Oriana Altuve
FW	21	Bárbara Olivieri	(yellow card) 49'	(substituted off) 52'
Substitutes:
GK	1	Micheel Rengifo
GK	22	Valeria Rebanales
DF	3	Gabriela Angulo
DF	4	María Peraza
DF	17	Camila Pescatore
MF	12	Ailing Herrera
MF	15	Yerliane Moreno		(substituted in) 60'
MF	16	Floriangel Apóstol	(yellow card) 77'	(substituted in) 72'
MF	23	Melanie Chirinos		(substituted in) 60'
FW	10	Joemar Guarecuco		(substituted in) 52'
FW	18	Ysaura Viso
FW	19	Mariana Speckmaier		(substituted in) 45'
Manager:
(Brazil) Ricardo Belli

Player of the match:
Claudia Martínez (Paraguay)

Assistant referees:
Daiana Fernández (Uruguay)
Belén Clavijo (Uruguay)
Fourth official:
Marcelly Zambrano (Ecuador)

== Discipline ==
Fair play points will be used as tiebreakers in the group if the overall and head-to-head records of teams were tied. These are calculated based on yellow and red cards received in all group matches as follows:

- first yellow card: plus 1 point;
- indirect red card (second yellow card): plus 3 points;
- direct red card: plus 4 points;
- yellow card and direct red card: plus 5 points;

Team	Match 1				Match 2				Match 3				Match 4				Points
Team	Booked	(yellow card) (yellow-red card)	Sent off (straight red)	(yellow card) (red card)	Booked	(yellow card) (yellow-red card)	Sent off (straight red)	(yellow card) (red card)	Booked	(yellow card) (yellow-red card)	Sent off (straight red)	(yellow card) (red card)	Booked	(yellow card) (yellow-red card)	Sent off (straight red)	(yellow card) (red card)	Points
Brazil	2				2				2				2		1		-12
Colombia	2								1				1				-4
Paraguay					1					1			1				-5
Venezuela					3				2				3		1		-12
Bolivia					3	1			1								-7
