= 2025 Copa América Femenina final =

2025 Womens Copa América final

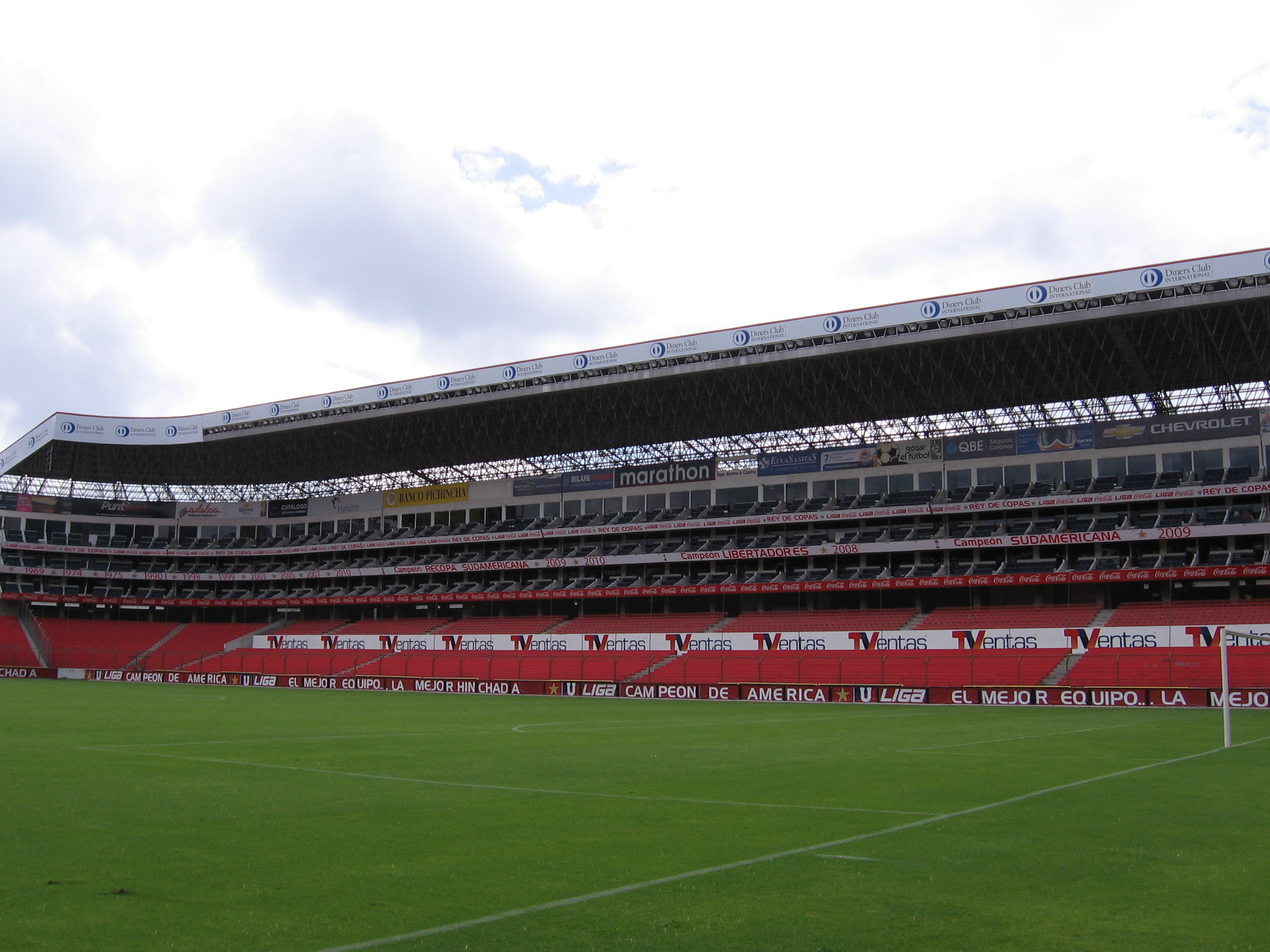
- Estadio Rodrigo Paz Delgado hosted the final.
- Event: 2025 Copa América Femenina
Colombia	Brazil
(Colombia)	(Brazil)
4	4
- After extra time Brazil won 5–4 on penalties
- Date: 2 August 2025
- Venue: Estadio Rodrigo Paz Delgado, Quito
- Player of the Match: Marta (Brazil)
- Referee: Dione Rissios (Chile)

The 2025 Copa América Femenina final was a women's association football match that took place on 2 August 2025 at Estadio Rodrigo Paz Delgado in Quito, Ecuador, to determine the winner of the 2025 Copa América Femenina. The match took place between Colombia and Brazil.

After a 4–4 tie in extra time, Brazil defeated Colombia in a 5-4 penalty shoot-out, thus winning their fifth consecutive (and record-extending ninth overall) Copa América Femenina title.

By participating in the final, both national teams qualified for the 2028 Summer Olympics. As the tournament's winner, Brazil qualified to play in the 2026 Women's Finalissima, where they will face off against England in a repeat of the 2023 tournament.

== Venue ==
The final match of the tournament was held at Estadio Rodrigo Paz Delgado in Ecuador's capital, Quito. With a maximum capacity of 41,575, it is the largest stadium in the city and the second largest in the country.

== Route to the final ==
Colombia		Round	Brazil
Opponents	Result	Group stage	Opponents	Result
Venezuela	0–0	Match 1	Venezuela	2–0
Paraguay	4–1	Match 2	Bolivia	6–0
Bolivia	8–0	Match 3	Paraguay	4–1
Brazil	0–0	Match 4	Colombia	0–0
Group B runners-up		Final standings	Group B winners
Opponents	Result	Knockout stage	Opponents	Result
Argentina	0 (5)–0 (4)	Semi-finals	Uruguay	5–1

=== Colombia ===
Colombia's route to the final began on 16 July, after it was drawn into Group B, with a 0–0 draw against Venezuela. That match was followed by a 4–1 victory over Paraguay on 19 July and an 8–0 victory against Bolivia on 22 July. Its last group stage match ended in another 0–0 draw against Brazil, on 25 July, resulting in a Group B runner-up position, with 8 points. On 28 July, Colombia advance from its semi-finals through a penalty 5–4 shoot-out after a 0–0 draw against Group A's first-place team, Argentina.

=== Brazil ===
Brazil came in the most decorated team in the tournament, having won it eight times, including the recent 2022 edition. Also included in Group B, the team began the tournament on 13 July, defeating Venezuela 2–0, followed by Bolivia 6–0 on 16 July and Paraguay 4–1 on 22 July. Its last group stage match was on 25 July a 0–0 draw with Colombia. Brazil qualified for the semi-finals after finishing at the top of Group B with 10 points. The team played against and defeated Group B's runner-up, Uruguay, in the semi-final, a 5–1 win on 29 July, and reached the finals with 21 goals scored in their six previous matches.

== Match ==
=== Summary ===
Early on in the match, Colombia created multiple chances, with forwards Valerin Loboa and Linda Caicedo testing Brazil's defense. Meanwhile, Brazil's offense struggled to break through Colombia's defense, despite creating a few chances of their own.

After 25 minutes, Colombia's persistence paid off when Caicedo scored with a close-range finish following a blocked shot. Brazil made substitutions in the first-half stoppage time, and then shortly after, Colombian centre-back Jorelyn Carabalí fouled Brazil's forward Gio Garbelini inside the penalty area, and a penalty was awarded to Brazil after a VAR review, with midfielder Angelina converting to equalize going into halftime.

At the start of the second half, Brazil nearly took the lead, with a Gio shot hitting the post. After 69 minutes, Brazilian Tarciane allowed an own goal when her back–pass went past her own goalkeeper, but the team quickly responded, and forward Amanda Gutierres scored with a volley to make it 2–2 after 80 minutes. After a counterattack by Colombia, Mayra Ramírez scored to give Colombia a 3–2 lead.

In stoppage time, Brazilian forward Marta equalized with a long-range shot to force extra time, in which both teams slowed down, but Marta then scored again at the end of the first half of extra time to make it 4–3. Colombian midfielder Leicy Santos then equalized with a free kick in the second half, sending the match to a penalty shoot–out.

In the shoot-out, Brazil triumphed. Marta had a chance to win the match, but goalkeeper Katherine Tapia saved her penalty. Luany then scored Brazil's decisive penalty to put them ahead, and goalkeeper Lorena then saved Carabalí's shot to secure a 5–4 victory for Brazil.

=== Details ===
2 August 2025
16:00 ECT

Colombia	4–4 (a.e.t.)	Brazil
Caicedo 25'; Tarciane 69' (o.g.); Ramírez 88'; Santos 115'	Report (WEB) Report (CONMEBOL)	Angelina 45+9' (pen.); Amanda Gutierres 80'; Marta 90+6', 105'
Penalties
Usme (penalty scored); Restrepo (penalty scored); Paví (penalty missed); Santos (penalty missed); Caicedo (penalty scored); Bonilla (penalty scored); Carabalí (penalty missed)	4–5	(penalty scored) Tarciane; (penalty missed) Angelina; (penalty scored) Amanda Gutierres; (penalty scored) Mariza; (penalty missed) Marta; (penalty scored) Jhonson; (penalty scored) Luany

Estadio Rodrigo Paz Delgado, Quito
Referee: Dione Rissios (Chile)

Colombia	Brazil

GK	12	Katherine Tapia	(yellow card) 45+3'
DF	17	Carolina Arias (c)		(substituted off) 107'
DF	3	Daniela Arias	(yellow card) 40'
DF	16	Jorelyn Carabalí	(yellow card) 45+7'
DF	22	Daniela Caracas
MF	10	Leicy Santos
MF	5	Lorena Bedoya	(yellow card) 32'	(substituted off) 107'
MF	20	Ilana Izquierdo		(substituted off) 86'
FW	21	Valerin Loboa		(substituted off) 72'
FW	9	Mayra Ramírez		(substituted off) 90+5'
FW	18	Linda Caicedo
Substitutes:
GK	1	Catalina Pérez
GK	13	Luisa Agudelo
DF	2	Mary Álvarez
DF	4	Ana María Guzmán
DF	14	Ángela Barón
DF	19	Yirleidis Minota
MF	6	Daniela Montoya
MF	8	Marcela Restrepo		(substituted on) 107'
MF	11	Catalina Usme		(substituted on) 72'
FW	7	Manuela Paví		(substituted on) 86'
FW	15	Wendy Bonilla		(substituted on) 107'
FW	23	Liced Serna		(substituted on) 90+5'
Manager:
(Colombia) Ángelo Marsiglia

GK	1	Lorena
DF	3	Tarciane	(yellow card) 40'
DF	20	Mariza	(yellow card) 103'
DF	13	Fe Palermo		(substituted off) 44'
MF	18	Gabi Portilho		(substituted off) 76'
MF	5	Duda Sampaio		(substituted off) 81'
MF	8	Angelina (c)	(yellow card) 118'
MF	6	Yasmim
MF	7	Kerolin		(substituted off) 108'
FW	11	Gio Garbelini		(substituted off) 82'
FW	21	Dudinha		(substituted off) 44'
Substitutes:
GK	12	Camila Rodrigues
GK	14	Cláudia
DF	2	Antônia
DF	4	Kaká
DF	16	Fátima Dutra
DF	23	Isa Haas	(yellow card) 104'	(substituted on) 44'
MF	15	Ary Borges
MF	17	Vitória Yaya		(substituted on) 81'
FW	9	Amanda Gutierres		(substituted on) 44'
FW	10	Marta		(substituted on) 82'
FW	19	Jhonson		(substituted on) 108'
FW	22	Luany		(substituted on) 76'
Manager:
(Brazil) Arthur Elias

Player of the Match:
Marta (Brazil)

Assistant referees:
Marcia Castillo (Chile)
Leslie Vasquez (Chile)
Fourth official:
Anahí Fernández (Uruguay)
Video assistant referee:
Augusto Alfredo Menendez (Peru)
Assistant video assistant referee:
Wilma Balderrama (Bolivia)

Match rules

- 90 minutes
- 30 minutes of extra time if necessary
- Penalty shoot-out if scores still level
- Maximum of twelve named substitutes
- Maximum of five substitutions, with a sixth allowed in extra time (Note: Each team was given only three opportunities to make substitutions, with a fourth opportunity in extra time, excluding substitutions made at half-time, before the start of extra time and at half-time in extra time.)

== Post-match ==
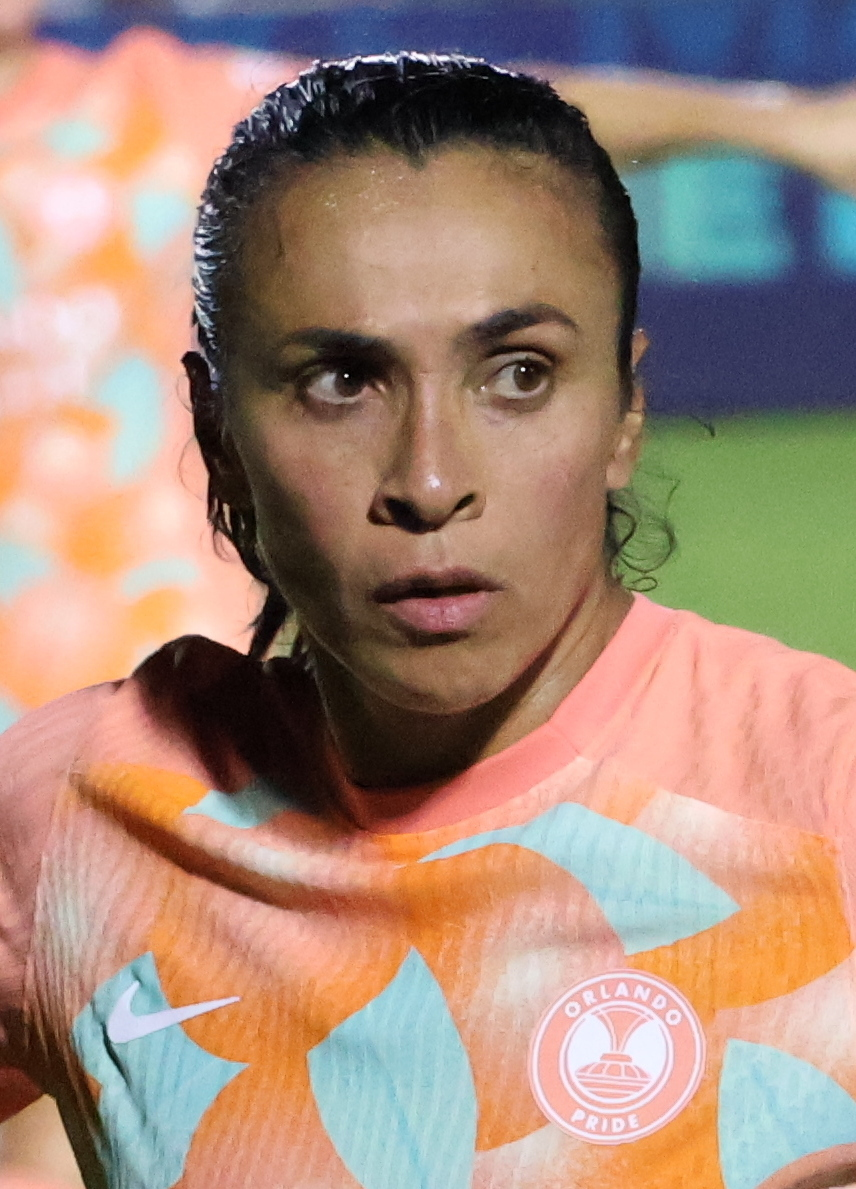
Marta was named the Most Valuable Player of the competition.

The win makes Brazil a nine-time champion of the competition, winning all editions (1991, 1995, 1998, 2003, 2010, 2014, 2018, and 2022), except in 2006, where they lost to Argentina in the final. It is also its fifth consecutive team title and the first under the leadership of manager Arthur Elias.

Marta was named the Most Valuable Player for the 2025 tournament. With her two goals in the match, she became the first player to score at least two goals in a Copa América Femenina final since 1998. It was also announced that it would be her last match in this competition.

As winners, Brazil was awarded a prize of U$1.5 million (approximately R$8,4 million) and secured a spot in the 2026 Women's Finalissima against England, winners of UEFA Women's Euro 2025, a rematch of the inaugural 2023 edition that was played in England. Furthermore, both finalist teams qualified for the 2028 Summer Olympics.

== See also ==
- Copa América Femenina
- Women in Sport
- 2022 Copa América Femenina
