= 2025 SheBelieves Cup squads =

List of players competing at the 10th edition of the SheBelieves Cup

This article lists the squads for the 2025 SheBelieves Cup, the 10th edition of the SheBelieves Cup. The cup consists of a series of friendly games, and will be held in the United States from 20 to 26 February 2025. The four national teams involved in the tournament register a squad of 23 players.

The age listed for each player is on 20 February 2025, the first day of the tournament. The number of caps and goals listed for each player excludes any matches played after the tournament began. The club listed is the club for which the player last played a competitive match prior to the tournament. The nationality for each club reflects the national association (not the league) to which the club is affiliated. A flag is included for coaches that are of a different nationality than their own national team.

== Squads ==
=== Australia ===
Coach: (Scotland) Tom Sermanni

The squad was announced on 4 February 2025. On 13 February 2025, Clare Wheeler was medically withdrawn and replaced by Alana Murphy.

No.	Pos.	Player	Date of birth (age)	Caps	Goals	Club
1	GK	Mackenzie Arnold	25 February 1994 (aged 30)	57	0	(United States Soccer Federation) Portland Thorns
2	FW	Michelle Heyman	4 July 1988 (aged 36)	74	28	(Football Australia) Canberra United
3	DF	Winonah Heatley	18 June 2001 (aged 23)	4	0	(Danish Football Association) Nordsjælland
4	DF	Clare Hunt	12 March 1999 (aged 25)	28	1	(The Football Association) Tottenham Hotspur
5	DF	Natasha Prior	20 January 1998 (aged 27)	3	2	(Football Australia) Newcastle Jets
6	MF	Alana Murphy	21 September 2005 (aged 19)	0	0	(Football Australia) Melbourne Victory
7	DF	Steph Catley (captain)	26 January 1994 (aged 31)	132	7	(The Football Association) Arsenal
8	FW	Kaitlyn Torpey	17 March 2000 (aged 24)	10	1	(United States Soccer Federation) San Diego Wave
9	FW	Caitlin Foord	11 November 1994 (aged 30)	130	38	(The Football Association) Arsenal
10	MF	Emily van Egmond	12 July 1993 (aged 31)	153	31	(The Football Association) Birmingham City
11	FW	Mary Fowler	14 February 2003 (aged 22)	58	15	(The Football Association) Manchester City
12	GK	Teagan Micah	20 October 1997 (aged 27)	18	0	(The Football Association) Liverpool
13	MF	Tameka Yallop	16 June 1991 (aged 33)	130	14	(Football Australia) Brisbane Roar
14	DF	Alanna Kennedy	21 January 1995 (aged 30)	131	11	(United States Soccer Federation) Angel City
15	MF	Daniela Galic	17 June 2006 (aged 18)	4	0	(Royal Dutch Football Association) Twente
16	FW	Hayley Raso	5 September 1994 (aged 30)	92	20	(The Football Association) Tottenham Hotspur
17	FW	Holly McNamara	23 January 2003 (aged 22)	3	0	(Football Australia) Melbourne City
18	GK	Chloe Lincoln	4 January 2005 (aged 20)	1	0	(Football Australia) Western United
19	MF	Katrina Gorry	13 August 1992 (aged 32)	112	17	(The Football Association) West Ham United
20	FW	Laini Freier	24 July 2001 (aged 23)	0	0	(Football Australia) Brisbane Roar
21	DF	Ellie Carpenter	28 April 2000 (aged 24)	84	4	(French Football Federation) Lyon
22	DF	Charli Grant	20 September 2001 (aged 23)	28	1	(The Football Association) Tottenham Hotspur
23	MF	Kyra Cooney-Cross	15 February 2002 (aged 23)	52	1	(The Football Association) Arsenal

=== Colombia ===
Coach: Ángelo Marsiglia

The squad was announced on 14 February 2025.

No.	Pos.	Player	Date of birth (age)	Caps	Goals	Club
1	GK	Luisa Fernanda Agudelo	27 March 2007 (aged 17)	0	0	(Colombian Football Federation) Deportivo Cali
2	DF	Mary Álvarez	22 August 2005 (aged 19)	0	0	(Colombian Football Federation) Atlético Nacional
3	DF	Daniela Arias	31 August 1994 (aged 30)	51	4	(Brazilian Football Confederation) Corinthians
4	DF	Ana María Guzmán	11 June 2005 (aged 19)	7	0	(United States Soccer Federation) Utah Royals
5	DF	Yirleidis Minota	10 November 2002 (aged 22)	9	0	(Mexican Football Federation) Pachuca
6	MF	Daniela Montoya (captain)	22 August 1990 (aged 34)	92	13	(Brazilian Football Confederation) Grêmio
7	FW	Manuela Paví	23 December 2000 (aged 24)	23	5	(The Football Association) West Ham United
8	MF	Marcela Restrepo	10 November 1995 (aged 29)	32	3	(Mexican Football Federation) Monterrey
9	FW	Mayra Ramírez	25 March 1999 (aged 25)	44	8	(The Football Association) Chelsea
10	MF	Leicy Santos	16 May 1996 (aged 28)	71	15	(United States Soccer Federation) Washington Spirit
11	MF	Catalina Usme	25 December 1989 (aged 35)	113	56	(Turkish Football Federation) Galatasaray
12	GK	Katherine Tapia	7 December 1992 (aged 32)	15	0	(Brazilian Football Confederation) Palmeiras
13	GK	Natalia Giraldo	19 May 2003 (aged 21)	12	0	(Colombian Football Federation) América de Cali
14	DF	Ángela Barón	18 September 2003 (aged 21)	10	0	(United States Soccer Federation) Racing Louisville
15	FW	Wendy Bonilla	8 July 2002 (aged 22)	8	1	(Mexican Football Federation) UNAM
16	DF	Jorelyn Carabalí	18 May 1997 (aged 27)	48	0	(The Football Association) Brighton & Hove Albion
17	DF	Carolina Arias	2 September 1990 (aged 34)	106	0	(Colombian Football Federation) América de Cali
18	FW	Linda Caicedo	22 February 2005 (aged 19)	39	12	(Royal Spanish Football Federation) Real Madrid
19	FW	Karla Torres	11 October 2006 (aged 18)	0	0	(The Football Association) Leicester City
20	MF	Sara Martínez	22 January 2001 (aged 24)	6	1	(Colombian Football Federation) Atlético Nacional
21	MF	María Camila Reyes	11 May 2002 (aged 22)	13	0	(Colombian Football Federation) Santa Fe
22	DF	Daniela Caracas	25 April 1997 (aged 27)	50	0	(Royal Spanish Football Federation) Espanyol
23	FW	Ivonne Chacon	12 October 1997 (aged 27)	19	2	(Royal Spanish Football Federation) Levante UD

=== Japan ===
Coach: (Denmark) Nils Nielsen

The squad was announced on 5 February 2025.

No.	Pos.	Player	Date of birth (age)	Caps	Goals	Club
1	GK	Ayaka Yamashita	29 September 1995 (age 30)	76	0	(The Football Association) Manchester City
2	DF	Saori Takarada	22 August 1996 (age 29)	22	1	(The Football Association) Leicester City
3	DF	Moeka Minami	7 December 1998 (age 27)	57	4	(Italian Football Federation) Roma
4	DF	Saki Kumagai	17 October 1990 (age 35)	157	3	(The Football Association) London City Lionesses
5	DF	Hana Takahashi	19 February 2000 (age 25)	31	3	(Japan Football Association) Urawa Reds
6	DF	Tōko Koga	6 January 2006 (age 20)	12	1	(Royal Dutch Football Association) Feyenoord
7	MF	Hinata Miyazawa	28 November 1999 (age 26)	42	9	(The Football Association) Manchester United
8	MF	Kiko Seike	8 August 1996 (age 29)	27	7	(The Football Association) Brighton & Hove Albion
9	FW	Riko Ueki	30 July 1999 (age 26)	40	12	(The Football Association) West Ham United
10	MF	Fuka Nagano	9 March 1999 (age 26)	45	1	(The Football Association) Liverpool
11	FW	Mina Tanaka	28 April 1994 (age 31)	86	39	(United States Soccer Federation) Utah Royals
12	GK	Chika Hirao	31 December 1996 (age 29)	9	0	(Japan Football Association) Albirex Niigata
13	DF	Hikaru Kitagawa	10 May 1997 (age 28)	14	2	(Swedish Football Association) BK Häcken FF
14	MF	Yui Hasegawa	29 January 1997 (age 28)	90	20	(The Football Association) Manchester City
15	MF	Aoba Fujino	27 January 2004 (age 21)	26	8	(The Football Association) Manchester City
16	MF	Momoko Tanikawa	7 May 2005 (age 20)	8	2	(German Football Association) Bayern Munich
17	MF	Maika Hamano	9 May 2004 (age 21)	16	4	(The Football Association) Chelsea
18	MF	Honoka Hayashi	19 May 1998 (age 27)	36	2	(The Football Association) Everton
19	FW	Remina Chiba	30 April 1999 (age 26)	16	4	(German Football Association) Eintracht Frankfurt
20	MF	Narumi Miura	3 July 1997 (age 28)	32	1	(United States Soccer Federation) Washington Spirit
21	DF	Rion Ishikawa	4 July 2003 (age 22)	9	0	(Japan Football Association) Urawa Reds
22	MF	Yuka Momiki	9 April 1996 (age 29)	41	14	(The Football Association) Leicester City
23	GK	Akane Okuma	15 September 2004 (age 21)	0	0	(Japan Football Association) INAC Kobe Leonessa

=== United States ===
Coach: (England) Emma Hayes

The squad was announced on February 11, 2025.

No.	Pos.	Player	Date of birth (age)	Caps	Goals	Club
1	GK	Jane Campbell	February 17, 1995 (aged 30)	8	0	(United States Soccer Federation) Houston Dash
2	DF	Emily Sams	July 1, 1999 (aged 25)	2	0	(United States Soccer Federation) Orlando Pride
3	MF	Korbin Albert	October 13, 2003 (aged 21)	22	1	(French Football Federation) Paris Saint-Germain
4	DF	Tara McKeown	July 2, 1999 (aged 25)	0	0	(United States Soccer Federation) Washington Spirit
5	DF	Jenna Nighswonger	November 28, 2000 (aged 24)	18	2	(The Football Association) Arsenal
6	FW	Lynn Biyendolo	May 21, 1993 (aged 31)	75	21	(United States Soccer Federation) Seattle Reign
7	FW	Alyssa Thompson	November 7, 2004 (aged 20)	13	1	(United States Soccer Federation) Angel City
8	MF	Jaedyn Shaw	November 20, 2004 (aged 20)	21	8	(United States Soccer Federation) North Carolina Courage
9	FW	Ally Sentnor	February 18, 2004 (aged 21)	2	0	(United States Soccer Federation) Utah Royals
10	MF	Lindsey Heaps (captain)	May 26, 1994 (aged 30)	161	36	(French Football Federation) Lyon
11	MF	Lily Yohannes	June 12, 2007 (aged 17)	2	1	(Royal Dutch Football Association) Ajax
12	DF	Tierna Davidson	September 19, 1998 (aged 26)	65	3	(United States Soccer Federation) Gotham FC
13	FW	Emma Sears	February 23, 2001 (aged 23)	3	1	(United States Soccer Federation) Racing Louisville
14	DF	Emily Sonnett	November 25, 1993 (aged 31)	103	2	(United States Soccer Federation) Gotham FC
15	DF	Gisele Thompson	December 2, 2005 (aged 19)	0	0	(United States Soccer Federation) Angel City
16	MF	Claire Hutton	January 11, 2006 (aged 19)	0	0	(United States Soccer Federation) Kansas City Current
17	MF	Sam Coffey	December 31, 1998 (aged 26)	28	1	(United States Soccer Federation) Portland Thorns
18	GK	Mandy McGlynn	November 3, 1998 (aged 26)	1	0	(United States Soccer Federation) Utah Royals
19	DF	Crystal Dunn	July 3, 1992 (aged 32)	155	25	(French Football Federation) Paris Saint-Germain
20	MF	Catarina Macario	October 4, 1999 (aged 25)	19	8	(The Football Association) Chelsea
21	FW	Michelle Cooper	December 4, 2004 (aged 20)	0	0	(United States Soccer Federation) Kansas City Current
22	FW	Yazmeen Ryan	February 25, 1999 (aged 25)	4	0	(United States Soccer Federation) Houston Dash
23	DF	Emily Fox	July 5, 1998 (aged 26)	62	1	(The Football Association) Arsenal

== Player representation ==
=== By club ===
Clubs with 3 or more players represented are listed.

Players	Club(s)
5	(England) Arsenal
4	(England) Manchester City, (United States) Utah Royals
3	(United States) Angel City FC, (England) Chelsea, (England) Leicester City, (England) Tottenham Hotspur, (United States) Washington Spirit, (England) West Ham United

=== By club nationality ===
Players	Club(s)
29	England
24	United States
7	Australia
6	Colombia
4	France, Japan
3	Brazil, Mexico, Netherlands, Spain
2	Germany
1	Denmark, Italy, Sweden, Turkey

=== By club federation ===
Players	Federation
45	UEFA
27	CONCACAF
11	AFC
9	CONMEBOL

=== By representatives of domestic league ===
Players	National squad
16	United States
7	Australia
6	Colombia
4	Japan
