= Football at the 2024 Summer Olympics – Women's tournament – Group A =

Group A of the women's football tournament at the 2024 Summer Olympics was played from 25 to 31 July 2024. The group, one of three 4-team groups competing in the group stage of the Olympic tournament, consisted of Canada, Colombia, hosts France and New Zealand. The top two teams, France and Canada, advanced to the knockout stage, along with third-placed Colombia as one of the two best third-placed teams among all three groups.

== Teams ==
Draw position	Team	Pot	Confederation	Method of qualification	Date of qualification	Olympic appearance	Last appearance	Previous best performance
A1	France	1	UEFA	Hosts	13 September 2017	3rd	2016	Fourth place (2012)
A2	Colombia	3	CONMEBOL	2022 Copa América Femenina top two	25 July 2022	3rd	2016	Eleventh place (2012, 2016)
A3	Canada	2	CONCACAF	CONCACAF play-off winner	26 September 2023	5th	2020	Gold medalists (2020)
A4	New Zealand	4	OFC	Oceania Qualifier winner	19 February 2024	5th	2020	Eighth place (2012)

== Standings ==
Pos	Team	Pld	W	D	L	GF	GA	GD	Pts	Qualification
1	France (H)	3	2	0	1	6	5	+1	6	Advance to knockout stage
2	Canada	3	3	0	0	5	2	+3	3 (Note: On 27 July 2024, Canada was penalized 6 points by FIFA for their coaching staff's involvement in illegal drone spying at an official training venue. The decision was upheld by CAS on 31 July.)	Advance to knockout stage
3	Colombia	3	1	0	2	4	4	0	3	Advance to knockout stage
4	New Zealand	3	0	0	3	2	6	−4	0	

Source: FIFA
Rules for classification: Group stage tiebreakers
(H) Hosts
Notes:

In the quarter-finals:

- The winners of Group A, France, advanced to play the third-placed team of Group C, Brazil.
- The runners-up of Group A, Canada, advanced to play the runners-up of Group B, Germany.
- The third-placed team of Group A, Colombia, advanced to play the winners of Group C, Spain.

== Matches ==
=== Canada vs New Zealand ===
25 July 2024
17:00

Canada	2–1	New Zealand
Lacasse 45+4'; Viens 79'	Report	Barry 13'

Stade Geoffroy-Guichard, Saint-Étienne
Attendance: 2,674
Referee: Tess Olofsson (Sweden)

Canada	New Zealand

GK	1	Kailen Sheridan
CB	12	Jade Rose
CB	14	Vanessa Gilles
CB	3	Kadeisha Buchanan	(yellow card) 84'
RM	10	Ashley Lawrence
CM	17	Jessie Fleming (c)
CM	5	Quinn		(substituted off) 67'
LM	2	Gabrielle Carle		(substituted off) 67'
RF	15	Nichelle Prince		(substituted off) 56'
CF	11	Adriana Leon		(substituted off) 90+4'
LF	6	Cloé Lacasse		(substituted off) 56'
Substitutes:
GK	18	Sabrina D'Angelo
DF	20	Shelina Zadorsky		(substituted on) 90+4'
MF	7	Julia Grosso
MF	13	Simi Awujo		(substituted on) 67'
FW	4	Evelyne Viens		(substituted on) 67'
FW	9	Jordyn Huitema		(substituted on) 56'
FW	16	Janine Beckie		(substituted on) 56'
Assistant manager:
(United Kingdom) Andy Spence (Note: Andy Spence replaced manager Bev Priestman who was on a leave for this match in the wake of Canada's drone spying scandal.)

GK	1	Anna Leat
RB	4	CJ Bott
CB	14	Katie Bowen (c)
CB	13	Rebekah Stott
LB	3	Mackenzie Barry	(substituted off) 59'
RM	18	Grace Jale
CM	6	Malia Steinmetz	(substituted off) 59'
CM	11	Katie Kitching
LM	2	Kate Taylor	(substituted off) 87'
CF	10	Indiah-Paige Riley
CF	17	Milly Clegg	(substituted off) 66'
Substitutes:
GK	12	Victoria Esson
DF	5	Meikayla Moore
DF	7	Michaela Foster	(substituted on) 59'
MF	8	Macey Fraser	(substituted on) 59'
FW	9	Gabi Rennie	(substituted on) 87'
FW	15	Ally Green
FW	16	Jacqui Hand	(substituted on) 66'
Acting manager:
Michael Mayne

Assistant referees:
Almira Spahić (Sweden)
Francesca Di Monte (Italy)
Fourth official:
Frida Klarlund (Denmark)
Video assistant referee:
Rob Dieperink (Netherlands)
Assistant video assistant referee:
Katalin Kulcsár (Hungary)

=== France vs Colombia ===
25 July 2024
21:00

France	3–2	Colombia
Katoto 6', 42'; Dali 18'	Report	Usme 54' (pen.); Paví 64'

Stade de Lyon, Décines-Charpieu
Attendance: 29,208
Referee: Tori Penso (United States)

France	Colombia

GK	16	Pauline Peyraud-Magnin
RB	2	Maëlle Lakrar
CB	3	Wendie Renard (c)
CB	18	Griedge Mbock Bathy
LB	7	Sakina Karchaoui	(substituted off) 72'
DM	14	Sandie Toletti
CM	15	Kenza Dali
CM	8	Grace Geyoro
RF	11	Kadidiatou Diani	(substituted off) 90+1'
CF	12	Marie-Antoinette Katoto	(substituted off) 90+5'
LF	10	Delphine Cascarino	(substituted off) 72'
Substitutes:
GK	1	Constance Picaud
DF	4	Estelle Cascarino
DF	13	Selma Bacha	(substituted on) 72'
DF	21	Ève Périsset
MF	6	Amandine Henry	(substituted on) 90+1'
FW	9	Eugénie Le Sommer	(substituted on) 90+5'
FW	17	Sandy Baltimore	(substituted on) 72'
Manager:
Hervé Renard

GK	12	Katherine Tapia
RB	17	Carolina Arias		(substituted off) 83'
CB	16	Jorelyn Carabalí
CB	3	Daniela Arias
LB	2	Manuela Vanegas
DM	6	Daniela Montoya (c)		(substituted off) 46'
CM	8	Marcela Restrepo
CM	10	Leicy Santos
RF	9	Mayra Ramírez	(red card) 86'
CF	11	Catalina Usme
LF	18	Linda Caicedo
Substitutes:
GK	22	Sandra Sepúlveda
DF	4	Daniela Caracas
DF	5	Yirleidis Minota		(substituted on) 83'
DF	14	Ángela Barón
MF	13	Ilana Izquierdo
MF	15	Liana Salazar
FW	7	Manuela Paví		(substituted on) 46'
Manager:
Ángelo Marsiglia

Assistant referees:
Brooke Mayo (United States)
Kathryn Nesbitt (United States)
Fourth official:
Shamirah Nabadda (Uganda)
Video assistant referee:
Tatiana Guzmán (Nicaragua)
Assistant video assistant referee:
Daneon Parchment (Jamaica)

=== New Zealand vs Colombia ===
28 July 2024
17:00

New Zealand	0–2	Colombia
	Report	Restrepo 27'; Santos 72'

Stade de Lyon, Décines-Charpieu
Attendance: 5,212
Referee: Kim Yu-jeong (South Korea)

New Zealand	Colombia

GK	1	Anna Leat
RB	4	CJ Bott
CB	14	Katie Bowen (c)
CB	13	Rebekah Stott
LB	3	Mackenzie Barry	(substituted off) 76'
RM	10	Indiah-Paige Riley
CM	2	Kate Taylor	(substituted off) 76'
CM	6	Malia Steinmetz	(substituted off) 46'
LM	11	Katie Kitching
CF	17	Milly Clegg	(substituted off) 46'
CF	16	Jacqui Hand	(substituted off) 66'
Substitutes:
GK	12	Victoria Esson
DF	5	Meikayla Moore
DF	7	Michaela Foster	(substituted on) 76'
MF	18	Grace Jale	(substituted on) 46'
MF	20	Annalie Longo	(substituted on) 46'
FW	9	Gabi Rennie	(substituted on) 76'
FW	15	Ally Green	(substituted on) 66'
Acting manager:
Michael Mayne

GK	12	Katherine Tapia
RB	17	Carolina Arias	(substituted off) 86'
CB	3	Daniela Arias
CB	16	Jorelyn Carabalí
LB	2	Manuela Vanegas
CM	13	Ilana Izquierdo	(substituted off) 90'
CM	11	Catalina Usme (c)	(substituted off) 78'
RW	8	Marcela Restrepo
AM	10	Leicy Santos
LW	18	Linda Caicedo	(substituted off) 90'
CF	7	Manuela Paví
Substitutes:
GK	22	Sandra Sepúlveda
DF	4	Daniela Caracas	(substituted on) 86'
DF	5	Yirleidis Minota	(substituted on) 90'
DF	14	Ángela Barón
MF	6	Daniela Montoya	(substituted on) 78'
MF	15	Liana Salazar	(substituted on) 90'
Manager:
Ángelo Marsiglia

Assistant referees:
Park Mi-suk (South Korea)
Joanna Charaktis (Australia)
Fourth official:
Shamirah Nabadda (Uganda)
Video assistant referee:
Khamis Al-Marri (Qatar)
Assistant video assistant referee:
Rob Dieperink (Netherlands)

=== France vs Canada ===
28 July 2024
21:00

France	1–2	Canada
Katoto 42'	Report	Fleming 58'; Gilles 90+12'

Stade Geoffroy-Guichard, Saint-Étienne
Attendance: 17,550
Referee: Bouchra Karboubi (Morocco)

France	Canada

GK	16	Pauline Peyraud-Magnin		(substituted off) 63'
RB	5	Élisa De Almeida
CB	18	Griedge Mbock Bathy
CB	3	Wendie Renard (c)		(substituted off) 72'
LB	13	Selma Bacha
DM	14	Sandie Toletti	(yellow card) 76'
CM	15	Kenza Dali
CM	8	Grace Geyoro
RF	11	Kadidiatou Diani		(substituted off) 82'
CF	12	Marie-Antoinette Katoto
LF	10	Delphine Cascarino		(substituted off) 63'
Substitutes:
GK	1	Constance Picaud		(substituted on) 63'
DF	2	Maëlle Lakrar		(substituted on) 72'
DF	4	Estelle Cascarino
DF	7	Sakina Karchaoui		(substituted on) 63'
MF	6	Amandine Henry		(substituted on) 82'
FW	17	Sandy Baltimore
FW	20	Vicki Bècho
Manager:
Hervé Renard

GK	1	Kailen Sheridan
RB	10	Ashley Lawrence	(yellow card) 45+2'
CB	12	Jade Rose
CB	14	Vanessa Gilles
CB	3	Kadeisha Buchanan
LB	2	Gabrielle Carle		(substituted off) 68'
CM	5	Quinn		(substituted off) 67'
CM	17	Jessie Fleming (c)
CM	13	Simi Awujo		(substituted off) 90'
CF	15	Nichelle Prince		(substituted off) 46'
CF	9	Jordyn Huitema
Substitutes:
GK	18	Sabrina D'Angelo
DF	20	Shelina Zadorsky
MF	7	Julia Grosso		(substituted on) 90'
FW	4	Evelyne Viens		(substituted on) 67'
FW	6	Cloé Lacasse
FW	11	Adriana Leon		(substituted on) 46'
FW	16	Janine Beckie		(substituted on) 68'
Acting manager:
(United Kingdom) Andy Spence

Assistant referees:
Fatiha Jermoumi (Morocco)
Diana Chikotesha (Zambia)
Fourth official:
Frida Klarlund (Denmark)
Video assistant referee:
Ivan Bebek (Croatia)
Assistant video assistant referee:
Daneon Parchment (Jamaica)

=== New Zealand vs France ===
31 July 2024
21:00

New Zealand	1–2	France
Taylor 43'	Report	Katoto 22', 49'

Stade de Lyon, Décines-Charpieu
Attendance: 21,946
Referee: Edina Alves Batista (Brazil)

New Zealand	France

GK	1	Anna Leat
RB	4	CJ Bott
CB	14	Katie Bowen (c)
CB	13	Rebekah Stott		(substituted off) 54'
LB	7	Michaela Foster		(substituted off) 63'
RM	10	Indiah-Paige Riley		(substituted off) 73'
CM	2	Kate Taylor
CM	20	Annalie Longo
LM	11	Katie Kitching		(substituted off) 54'
CF	16	Jacqui Hand		(substituted off) 74'
CF	18	Grace Jale
Substitutes:
GK	12	Victoria Esson
DF	3	Mackenzie Barry		(substituted on) 63'
DF	5	Meikayla Moore		(substituted on) 54'
MF	6	Malia Steinmetz		(substituted on) 74'
FW	9	Gabi Rennie
FW	15	Ally Green	(yellow card) 90+6'	(substituted on) 73'
FW	17	Milly Clegg		(substituted on) 54'
Acting manager:
Michael Mayne

GK	16	Pauline Peyraud-Magnin
RB	2	Maëlle Lakrar
CB	18	Griedge Mbock Bathy	(substituted off) 83'
CB	5	Élisa De Almeida
LB	7	Sakina Karchaoui
DM	6	Amandine Henry (c)
CM	8	Grace Geyoro	(substituted off) 63'
CM	13	Selma Bacha	(substituted off) 74'
RF	10	Delphine Cascarino	(substituted off) 83'
CF	12	Marie-Antoinette Katoto	(substituted off) 63'
LF	17	Sandy Baltimore
Substitutes:
GK	1	Constance Picaud
DF	4	Estelle Cascarino
DF	21	Ève Périsset	(substituted on) 83'
MF	14	Sandie Toletti	(substituted on) 74'
MF	15	Kenza Dali	(substituted on) 63'
FW	9	Eugénie Le Sommer	(substituted on) 83'
FW	11	Kadidiatou Diani	(substituted on) 63'
Manager:
Hervé Renard

Assistant referees:
Neuza Back (Brazil)
Fabrini Bevilaqua (Brazil)
Fourth official:
Shamirah Nabadda (Uganda)
Video assistant referee:
Daiane Muniz (Brazil)
Assistant video assistant referee:
Leodán González (Uruguay)

=== Colombia vs Canada ===
31 July 2024
21:00

Colombia	0–1	Canada
	Report	Gilles 61'

Stade de Nice, Nice
Attendance: 5,388
Referee: Rebecca Welch (Great Britain)

Colombia	Canada

GK	12	Katherine Tapia
RB	17	Carolina Arias (c)
CB	3	Daniela Arias
CB	5	Yirleidis Minota	(yellow card) 19'	(substituted off) 78'
LB	2	Manuela Vanegas
CM	16	Jorelyn Carabalí
CM	13	Ilana Izquierdo
RW	7	Manuela Paví	(yellow card) 6'
AM	8	Marcela Restrepo
LW	18	Linda Caicedo	(yellow card) 90+5'
CF	10	Leicy Santos
Substitutes:
GK	22	Sandra Sepúlveda
DF	4	Daniela Caracas
DF	14	Ángela Barón
MF	6	Daniela Montoya		(substituted on) 78'
MF	15	Liana Salazar
Manager:
Ángelo Marsiglia

GK	1	Kailen Sheridan
CB	12	Jade Rose
CB	14	Vanessa Gilles		(substituted off) 85'
CB	3	Kadeisha Buchanan
RM	10	Ashley Lawrence
CM	7	Julia Grosso		(substituted off) 74'
CM	17	Jessie Fleming (c)
LM	6	Cloé Lacasse		(substituted off) 46'
RF	16	Janine Beckie		(substituted off) 85'
CF	11	Adriana Leon	(yellow card) 45+3'	(substituted off) 61'
LF	9	Jordyn Huitema
Substitutes:
GK	18	Sabrina D'Angelo
DF	2	Gabrielle Carle		(substituted on) 85'
DF	20	Shelina Zadorsky		(substituted on) 85'
MF	5	Quinn		(substituted on) 74'
MF	13	Simi Awujo
FW	4	Evelyne Viens		(substituted on) 61'
FW	15	Nichelle Prince		(substituted on) 46'
Acting manager:
(United Kingdom) Andy Spence

Assistant referees:
Emily Carney (Great Britain)
Franca Overtoom (Netherlands)
Fourth official:
Veronika Bernatskaia (Kyrgyzstan)
Video assistant referee:
Paolo Valeri (Italy)
Assistant video assistant referee:
David Coote (Great Britain)

== Discipline ==
Canada were deducted 6 points by FIFA for their coaching staff's involvement in the Canada Soccer drone spying scandal. The decision was upheld by the Court of Arbitration for Sport on 31 July.

Fair play points would have been used as a tiebreaker if the overall and head-to-head records of teams were tied. These were calculated based on yellow and red cards received in all group matches as follows:

- first yellow card: minus 1 point;
- indirect red card (second yellow card): minus 3 points;
- direct red card: minus 4 points;
- yellow card and direct red card: minus 5 points;

Only one of the above deductions could be applied to a player in a single match.

Team	Match 1				Match 2				Match 3				Points
Team	Booked	(yellow card) (yellow-red card)	Sent off (straight red)	(yellow card) (red card)	Booked	(yellow card) (yellow-red card)	Sent off (straight red)	(yellow card) (red card)	Booked	(yellow card) (yellow-red card)	Sent off (straight red)	(yellow card) (red card)	Points
New Zealand									1				–1
France					1								–1
Canada	1				1				1				–3
Colombia				1					3				–8
