= Emilie Doerksen =

Bolivian football player

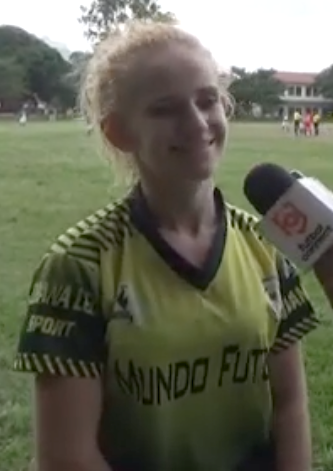
- Doerksen in 2017

Personal information
- Full name: Emilie Dueck Doerksen
- Date of birth: 3 October 2001 (age 25)
- Height: 1.65 m (5 ft 5 in)
- Position: Forward

College career
Years	Team	Apps	(Gls)
2021–2023	Angelina College	35	(16)
2023–2024	University of West Florida		

International career
2025	Bolivia		

Emilie Dueck Doerksen (3 October 2001) is a Bolivian football player who played as a forward for the University of West Florida and the Bolivian senior women's national team.

== Early life ==
Doerksen was raised in Santa Cruz, Bolivia. She attended the Unidad Educativa Villla Nueva High School, where she competed in soccer and track.

== Playing career ==
=== Collegiate career ===
Doerksen began her collegiate career at Angelina College during the 2021 season, appearing in 16 games and recording 10 goals and one assist. In the 2022 season, she played 19 games, making 10 starts, and registered six goals and nine assists.

In May 2023, Doerksen transferred to the University of West Florida. In the 2023 season, she appeared in 19 matches, starting 15, and recorded two goals and four assists.

=== International career ===
In 2025, Doerksen represented Bolivia as a member of the senior women's national team at the Copa América Femenina. She scored Bolivia's only goal in a 7–1 defeat to Venezuela in the group stage.

== Personal life ==
Doerksen has four siblings.
