= Pérola d'Oeste =

Coordinates: 25.8239°S 53.74°W

- Municipality
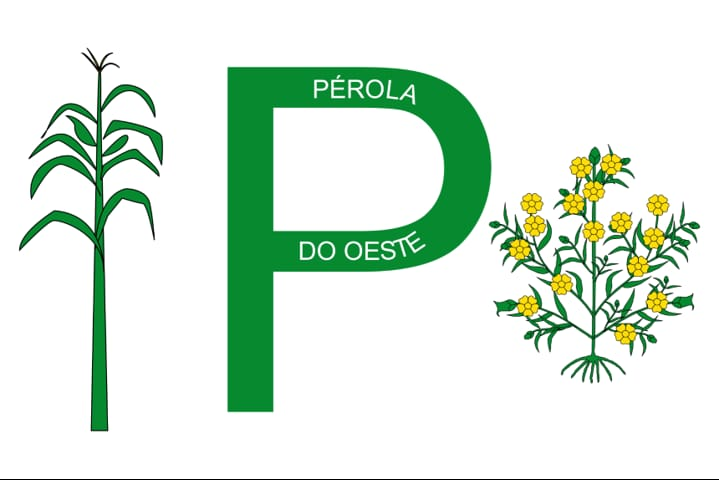
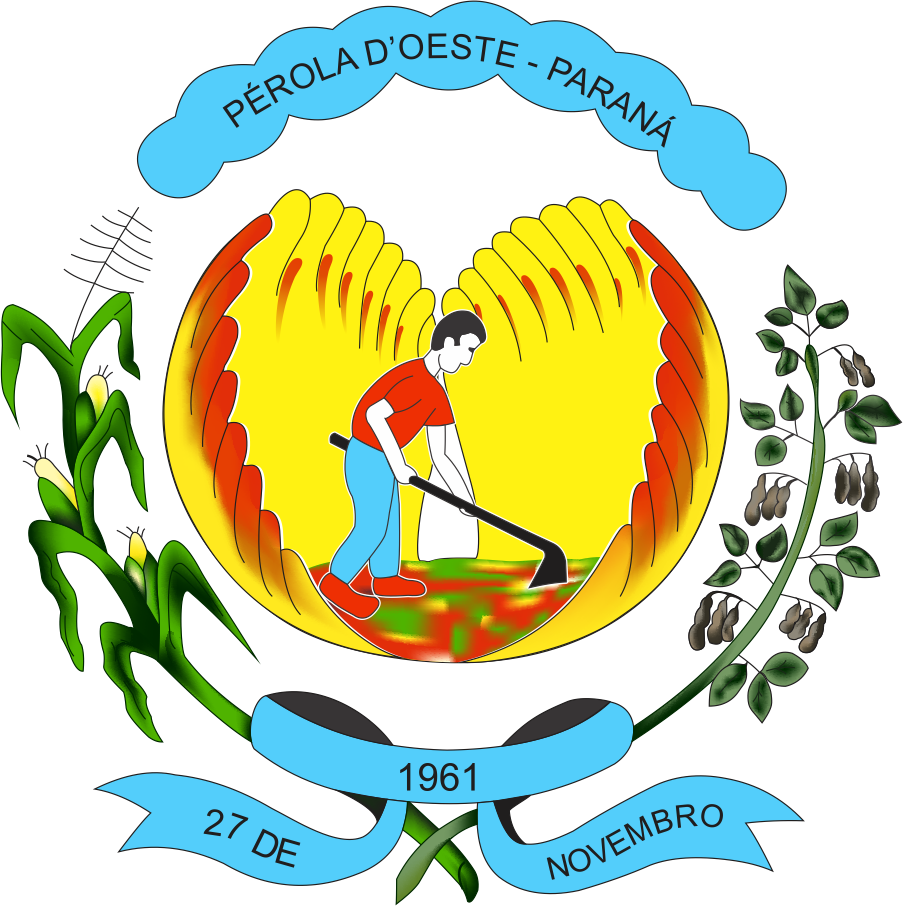
- Flag Coat of arms
- Interactive map of Pérola d'Oeste
- Country: Brazil
- Region: Southern
- State: Paraná
- Mesoregion: Sudoeste Paranaense

Population (2020)
  - Total: 6,288
- Time zone: UTC−3 (BRT)

Pérola d'Oeste is a municipality in the state of Paraná in the Southern Region of Brazil.

== See also ==
- List of municipalities in Paraná
