= Deisy Ojeda =

Paraguayan footballer (born 2000)

Personal information
- Full name: Deisy Estefanía Ojeda González
- Date of birth: 3 March 2000 (age 26)
- Place of birth: Asunción, Paraguay
- Height: 1.62 m (5 ft 4 in)
- Position: Left-back

Team information
- Current team: Tijuana
- Number: 4

Senior career*
Years	Team	Apps	(Gls)
- Olimpia
2020	Maccabi Kishronot Hadera		
2023–2025	Querétaro	74	(5)
2025–	Tijuana	18	(5)

International career^{‡}
2016	Paraguay U17	3	(0)
2018	Paraguay U20	2	(0)
2019–	Paraguay	1	(0)
- * Club domestic league appearances and goals ‡ National team caps and goals as of 4 October 2019

Deisy Estefanía Ojeda González (born 3 March 2000) is a Paraguayan footballer who plays as a left-back for Liga MX Femenil club Tijuana and the Paraguay women's national team.

== International career ==
Ojeda represented Paraguay at the 2016 FIFA U-17 Women's World Cup and the 2018 FIFA U-20 Women's World Cup. She made her senior debut on 4 October 2019 in a 1–1 friendly draw against Venezuela.
