= Carla Méndez =

Bolivian footballer (born 1997)

Personal information
- Full name: Carla Patricia Méndez Mendoza
- Date of birth: 30 January 1997 (age 29)
- Height: 1.59 m (5 ft 3 in)
- Positions: Midfielder; forward

Senior career*
Years	Team	Apps	(Gls)
- Santa Cruz FC

International career^{‡}
2012–2013	Bolivia U17	3+	(4)
2013–2014	Bolivia U20		
2014–2017	Bolivia	4	(0)
- * Club domestic league appearances and goals ‡ National team caps and goals as of 9 April 2017

Carla Patricia Méndez Mendoza (born 30 January 1997) is a Bolivian footballer who plays as a midfielder. She was a member of the Bolivia women's national team.

== Early life ==
Méndez hails from the Santa Cruz Department.

== International career ==
Méndez represented Bolivia at two South American U-17 Women's Championship editions (2012 and 2013) and the 2014 South American U-20 Women's Championship. At senior level, she played the 2014 Copa América Femenina. She also played a friendly against Brazil in 2017.
