= Ángela Cárdenas =

Bolivian footballer (born 1993)

Personal information
- Full name: Ángela Patricia Cárdenas Román
- Date of birth: 19 November 1993 (age 32)
- Height: 1.64 m (5 ft 5 in)
- Positions: Centre back; midfielder

Team information
- Current team: CAP Ciudad de Murcia

Senior career*
| Years | Team | Apps | (Gls) |
- Deportivo ITA
- San Martín de Porres
- Deportivo ITA
- Real Guaraní
| 2019 | CAP Ciudad de Murcia | | |

International career^{‡}
| 2013 | Bolivia U20 | | |
| 2010–2018 | Bolivia | 8 | (0) |
- * Club domestic league appearances and goals ‡ National team caps and goals as of 13 April 2018

Ángela Patricia Cárdenas Román (born 19 November 1993) is a Bolivian footballer who plays as a centre back for Spanish club CAP Ciudad de Murcia and the Bolivia women's national team.

== Early life ==
Cárdenas hails from the Santa Cruz Department.

== Club career ==
=== San Martín de Porres ===
Cárdenas scored a goal during the 2015 Copa Libertadores Femenina. She won the Bolivian football championship the next year.

== International career ==
Cárdenas played for Bolivia at senior level in three Copa América Femenina editions (2010, 2014 and 2018).
