= Soledad Belotto =

Paraguayan footballer (born 2003)

Personal information
- Full name: Soledad María Gudelia Belotto Alé
- Date of birth: 14 August 2003 (age 23)
- Place of birth: Asunción, Paraguay
- Height: 1.81 m (5 ft 11 in)
- Position: Goalkeeper

Team information
- Current team: Fenerbahçe

Senior career*
Years	Team	Apps	(Gls)
2022	Junior	2	(0)
2022–2025	Juventus	0	(0)
2025–2026	Alhama	15	(0)
2026–	Fenerbahçe	0	(0)

International career^{‡}
2022	Paraguay U20	3	(0)
2025–	Paraguay	5	(0)
- * Club domestic league appearances and goals as of 05:46, 28 July 2026 (UTC) ‡ National team caps and goals as of 28 July 2025

Soledad María Gudelia Belotto Alé (born 14 August 2003) is a Paraguayan footballer who plays as a goalkeeper for Turkish Women's Super League club Fenerbahçe.

She has previously played for Colombian side Junior, Italian Serie A club Juventus, and Spanish Liga F side Alhama.
