= Valerin Loboa =

Colombian footballer (born 2007)

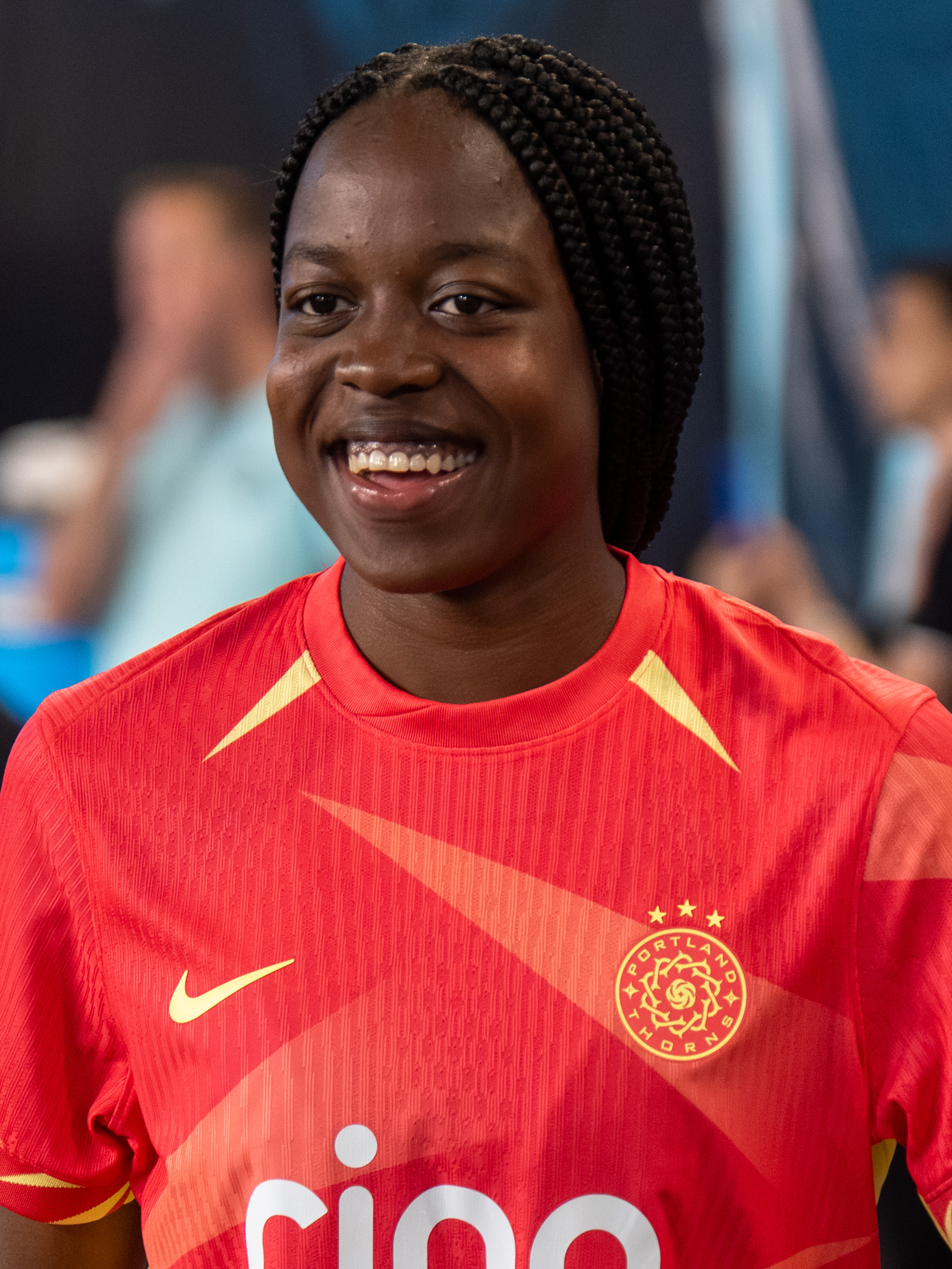
- Loboa with the Portland Thorns in 2025

Personal information
- Full name: Valerin Loboa Vásquez
- Date of birth: 3 July 2007 (age 19)
- Place of birth: Cali, Colombia
- Height: 1.75 m (5 ft 9 in)
- Positions: Forward; midfielder

Team information
- Current team: Portland Thorns
- Number: 88

Senior career*
Years	Team	Apps	(Gls)
2022–2025	Deportivo Cali	35	(8)
2025–	Portland Thorns	3	(0)

International career^{‡}
2024–	Colombia U20		
2025–	Colombia	6	(1)
Medal record
Women's football
Representing Colombia
Copa América Femenina
Runner-up	2025 Ecuador
FIFA U-20 Women's World Cup
Third place	2026 Poland
- * Club domestic league appearances and goals as of 17:58, 11 November 2026 (UTC) ‡ National team caps and goals as of 3 September 2025

Valerin Loboa Vásquez (born 3 July 2007) is a Colombian footballer who plays as a forward or midfielder for Portland Thorns FC of the National Women's Soccer League (NWSL) and the Colombia national team.

Loboa made her professional debut for her home-town club Deportivo Cali in 2022 at the age of 14, and won the Liga Femenina with the club in 2024. A cruciate ligament injury sustained that year cost her a place at the 2024 FIFA U-20 Women's World Cup on home soil; she returned to become Deportivo Cali's leading scorer in 2025 and was called into the senior national team for the first time that July.

She scored on her senior debut against Bolivia at the 2025 Copa América Femenina, started the closing matches of Colombia's run to the final, and joined the Portland Thorns in September 2025 on a contract through 2028. At the 2026 FIFA U-20 Women's World Cup in Poland she scored in stoppage time against Nigeria to win the quarter-final and take Colombia into the semi-finals for the first time in sixteen years.

== Early life ==
Loboa is from Villa Rica, a small municipality in the north of the Cauca Department, about 40 kilometres from Cali. (Note: National outlets including El Colombiano give Cali as her birthplace; regional coverage of her 2025 homecoming describes Villa Rica as her home town.) She is an only child; her mother is Francia Vásquez, who travelled with her to Poland for the 2026 World Cup.

She came through the youth system at Deportivo Cali, one of the longest-established women's academies in Colombia.

== Club career ==
=== Deportivo Cali ===
Loboa joined Deportivo Cali, the club of her home city, and made her professional debut for them in 2022 at the age of 14. She was part of the squad that won the Liga Femenina in 2024, the club's second national title in the competition.

Later in 2024 she ruptured the anterior cruciate ligament in her left knee, an injury that ruled her out of the 2024 FIFA U-20 Women's World Cup, which Colombia hosted. She returned for the 2025 season and scored seven goals with three assists in 14 matches, finishing as Deportivo Cali's leading scorer and drawing attention as one of the league's outstanding young players. In four seasons with the club she made 35 appearances, scoring eight goals and providing four assists.

=== Portland Thorns ===
On 3 September 2025 Portland Thorns FC of the National Women's Soccer League signed Loboa from Deportivo Cali for an undisclosed fee, on a contract running through the 2028 season with a club option for 2029. Jeff Agoos, the club's president and general manager of soccer operations, said her "talent and potential was showcased in one of women's football's biggest stages" and that she had committed to Portland "in spite of interest from some of the best clubs in the world". The move took her to a league in which several Colombia internationals were already playing, among them Leicy Santos, Ivonne Chacón and Ángela Barón.

She made her NWSL debut on 26 September 2025, replacing Deyna Castellanos in the second half of a 3–0 defeat away to Gotham FC. She became a more regular selection in 2026: by late September she had made six appearances that season, five of them starts, playing 419 minutes and scoring her first goal for the club.

== International career ==
=== Youth ===
Loboa was in contention for Colombia's squad for the 2024 FIFA U-20 Women's World Cup, held in Colombia, but missed the tournament because of the knee injury sustained earlier that year.

She was selected for the 2026 FIFA U-20 Women's World Cup in Poland. Colombia reached the round of 16, where they beat the hosts 1–0 in Łódź on 17 September 2026 through an 89th-minute own goal; Loboa led the Colombian side for expected goals in that match.

Three days later, in the quarter-final against Nigeria at the Władysław Król Municipal Stadium in Łódź, she scored in the second minute of stoppage time to settle a goalless match, running onto a pass played between the lines and finishing one-on-one with the goalkeeper. The win took Colombia into the semi-finals of the competition for the second time and the first since 2010, where they were drawn to meet North Korea. Loboa said afterwards that she had "sought the goal in each match", describing it as "something I longed for since the previous World Cup when I couldn't play due to injury".

=== Senior ===
Loboa received her first senior call-up in July 2025, when she was named in Colombia's 23-player squad for the 2025 Copa América Femenina in Quito, Ecuador. She made her debut on 22 July against Bolivia and scored in stoppage time to complete an 8–0 win, Colombia's largest ever victory.

She started Colombia's last three matches of the tournament, including the final. On 2 August 2025 Colombia drew 4–4 with Brazil in the final in Quito and lost 5–4 on penalties, finishing as runners-up; the result secured Colombia's place at the 2028 Olympic tournament.

== Style of play ==
Loboa is a forward who has also been used in midfield, and is most often deployed on the flanks. Colombian coverage of her emergence has emphasised her directness and her effectiveness in one-on-one situations.

== Career statistics ==
=== Club ===
As of 21 September 2026

Club	Season	League	Apps	Goals
Deportivo Cali	2022–2025	Liga Femenina	35	8
Deportivo Cali	Total	Liga Femenina	35	8
Portland Thorns	2025	NWSL	2	0
Portland Thorns	2026	NWSL	6	1
Portland Thorns	Total	NWSL	8	1
Career total			43	9

== Honours ==
Deportivo Cali

- Liga Femenina: 2024

Colombia

- Copa América Femenina runner-up: 2025

Colombia U20

- FIFA U-20 Women's World Cup third place: 2026
