= Cláudia (footballer) =

Brazilian footballer (born 1997)

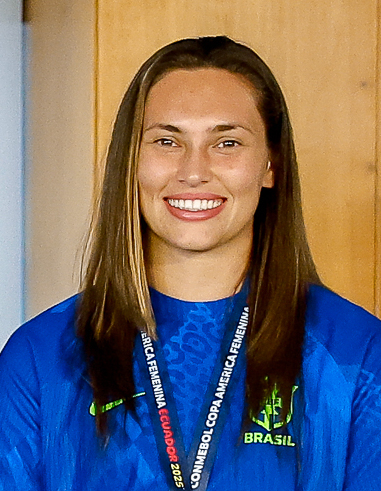
- Cláudia in 2025

Personal information
- Full name: Cláudia Luana de Oliveira
- Date of birth: 22 July 2002 (age 24)
- Place of birth: Pérola d'Oeste, Brazil
- Height: 1.86 m (6 ft 1 in)
- Position: Goalkeeper

Team information
- Current team: Cruzeiro
- Number: 64

Youth career
- 2018–2019: Toledo
- 2020–2021: Coritiba
- 2022: Grêmio
- 2023: Juventude

Senior career*
Years	Team	Apps	(Gls)
2019–2020	Toledo	10	(0)
2023–2024	Juventude	15	(0)
2025	Fluminense	0	(0)
2026–	Cruzeiro	0	(0)
Medal record
Women's football
Representing Brazil
Copa América Femenina
Gold medal – first place	2025 Ecuador
- * Club domestic league appearances and goals as of 16:17, 26 November 2024 (UTC)

Cláudia Luana de Oliveira (born 22 July 2002) is a Brazilian professional footballer who plays as a goalkeeper for Cruzeiro and the Brazil national team.

== Club career ==
Born in Pérola d'Oeste, Paraná, Cláudia began her career with local side Toledo in 2018. She made her senior debut in the following year, before moving to Coritiba in 2020, returning to youth football.

In 2022, Cláudia joined Grêmio; a third-choice in the main squad, she only played for the under-20 team. In 2023, she moved to Juventude, where she was initially a member of the under-20 squad before establishing herself as a starter and being a key unit in the club's two consecutive promotions.

== International career ==
In November 2024, Cláudia was called up to the Brazil national team by head coach Arthur Elias for two friendlies against Australia; she became the first player of Juventude to be called up to the national side in the club's history.
