= Fátima Dutra =

Brazilian footballer (born 1999)

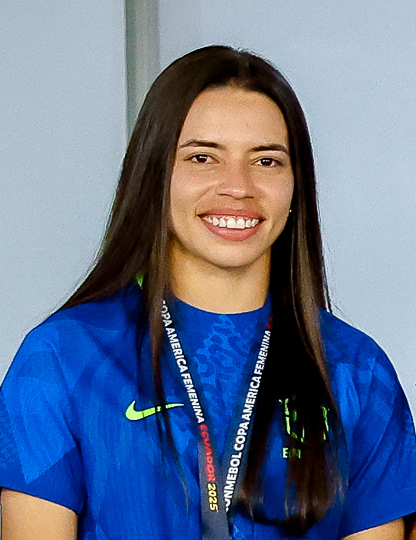
- Fátima Dutra in 2025

Personal information
- Full name: Francisca Fátima Aquino Dutra
- Date of birth: 8 December 1999 (age 26)
- Place of birth: Cedro, Brazil
- Height: 1.64 m (5 ft 5 in)
- Position: Left-back

Team information
- Current team: Ferroviária
- Number: 25

Youth career
- 2015–2017: Menina Olímpica
- 2017: → Tiradentes-PI (loan)

Senior career*
Years	Team	Apps	(Gls)
2016–2017	Menina Olímpica	0	(0)
2017	→ Tiradentes-PI (loan)	0	(0)
2017	→ XV de Piracicaba (loan)	0	(0)
2018	3B da Amazônia	1	(0)
2018	Vitória das Tabocas	7	(0)
2018–2019	Ceará	9	(3)
2019–2022	Torreense	46	(7)
2022–2024	Sporting CP	33	(4)
2024–	Ferroviária	13	(0)

International career^{‡}
2017	Brazil U17	4	(0)
Medal record
Women's football
Representing Brazil
Copa América Femenina
Gold medal – first place	2025 Ecuador
- * Club domestic league appearances and goals as of 18:01, 14 May 2025 (UTC) ‡ National team caps and goals as of 18:01, 14 May 2025 (UTC)

Francisca Fátima Aquino Dutra (born 8 December 1999), known as Fátima Dutra or just Fátima, is a Brazilian professional footballer who plays as a left-back for Ferroviária.

== Club career ==
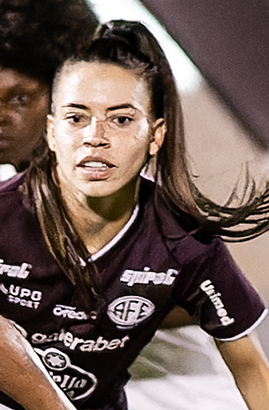
Fátima Dutra playing for Ferroviária in 2025

Born in Cedro, Ceará, Fátima began her career with Menina Olímpica, winning the 2016 Campeonato Cearense with the club. After playing for Tiradentes-PI, XV de Piracicaba and 3B da Amazônia, she followed the head coach of the latter to Vitória das Tabocas in April 2018.

Fátima moved to Ceará in 2018, but left for Portuguese side Torreense in September 2019. On 8 July 2022, she was announced at Sporting CP.

On 3 July 2024, Fátima signed a two-and-a-half-year contract with Ferroviária. In June 2026, her contract was renewed through the end of 2027.

== International career ==
After receiving call-ups to the Brazil national under-17 team, Fátima received her first call-up to the full side on 13 May 2025, for two friendlies against Japan.

== Honours ==
Menina Olímpica

- Campeonato Cearense de Futebol Feminino: 2016

Ceará

- Campeonato Cearense de Futebol Feminino: 2018
