= Isa Haas =

Brazilian professional footballer (born 2001)

Personal information
- Full name: Isadora Haas Gehlen
- Date of birth: 20 January 2001 (age 25)
- Place of birth: Montenegro, Rio Grande do Sul, Brazil
- Height: 1.77 m (5 ft 10 in)
- Position: Centre-back

Team information
- Current team: América
- Number: 2

Youth career
- 2017–2018: Internacional
- 2019: Internacional

Senior career*
| Years | Team | Apps | (Gls) |
| 2017–2018 | Internacional | 9 | (3) |
| 2019 | Sevilla | 5 | (0) |
| 2019–2024 | Internacional | 79 | (3) |
| 2025 | Cruzeiro | 0 | (0) |
| 2026– | América | 14 | (2) |

International career^{‡}
| 2018 | Brazil U17 | 3 | (0) |
| 2020 | Brazil U20 | 2 | (0) |
| 2024– | Brazil | 2 | (1) |
Medal record
Women's football
Representing Brazil
Copa América Femenina
| Gold medal – first place | 2025 Ecuador |
- * Club domestic league appearances and goals as of 17:18, 26 November 2024 (UTC) ‡ National team caps and goals as of 17:18, 26 November 2024 (UTC)

Isadora Haas Gehlen (born 20 January 2001), known as Isa Haas, is a Brazilian professional footballer who plays as a centre-back for Liga MX Femenil side Club América and the Brazil national team.

== Club career ==
=== Early career ===
Born in Montenegro, Rio Grande do Sul, Haas joined Internacional's youth sides in 2017, after the women's section reopened. She started to play in the main squad in the following year, helping in their promotion to the top tier.

=== Sevilla ===
In January 2019, Haas moved abroad and joined Spanish Primera División side Sevilla. She was rarely used at the side, featuring in just five matches.

=== Internacional return ===
In July 2019, Haas returned to Inter. On 10 November 2022, after helping the Colorado to a second position in the 2022 Campeonato Brasileiro Série A1, she renewed her contract with the club for two more years.

Haas reached 100 matches for the club in the following season, and established herself as an undisputed starter.

=== Cruzeiro ===
In September 2024, Haas agreed to a pre-contract with Cruzeiro for the upcoming season.

=== Club América ===
On 5 January 2026, Cruzeiro confirmed the permanent transfer of Hass to Liga MX Femenil side Club América, with América paying Cruzeiro a reported US$ 600,000 fee, making this the largest transfer fee paid by a Liga MX Femenil club, and the second largest transfer received by a Brazilian women's football club.

== International career ==
After representing Brazil at under-17 and under-20 levels, Haas received her first call-up to the senior side on 4 October 2024, for two friendlies against Colombia. She made her full international debut on 26 October, starting in the 1–1 draw at the Estádio Kleber Andrade, and scored her first goal three days later, netting the opener in the 3–1 win at the same venue.

=== List of international goals scored by Isa Haas ===
| No. | Date | Venue | Opponent | Score | Result | Competition |
|---|---|---|---|---|---|---|
| 1. | 29 October 2024 | Estádio Kléber Andrade, Cariacica, Brazil | Colombia | 1–0 | 3–1 | Friendly |

== Personal life ==
Haas' older brother Duda is also a footballer. A left-back, he was groomed at Juventude.

== Honours ==
Club América

- Liga MX Femenil: Clausura 2026
- CONCACAF W Champions Cup: 2025–26
- Liga MX Femenil: Campeón de Campeonas 2025-26

Internacional

- Campeonato Gaúcho de Futebol Feminino: 2017, 2019, 2020, 2021, 2023
- Campeonato Brasileiro Feminino Sub-18: 2019

Brazil U17

- South American Under-17 Women's Football Championship: 2018

Individual

- Campeonato Brasileiro Série A1 Team of the Year: 2025
