= Yirleidis Minota =

Colombian footballer (born 2002)

Personal information
- Full name: Yirleidis Quejada Minota
- Date of birth: 10 November 2002 (age 23)
- Place of birth: Carepa, Colombia
- Height: 1.70 m (5 ft 7 in)
- Position: Left-back

Team information
- Current team: Pachuca
- Number: 8

Senior career*
Years	Team	Apps	(Gls)
2019	Formas Íntimas		
2020–2022	Independiente Medellín	28+	(4+)
2022	Alianza Lima		
2023	Atlético Nacional	17	(3)
2024–	Pachuca	24	(1)

International career^{‡}
2022	Colombia U20	3	(0)
2024–	Colombia		
Medal record
Women's football
Representing Colombia
CONMEBOL Women's Nations League
Winner	2025–26
Copa América Femenina
Runner-up	2025 Ecuador
- * Club domestic league appearances and goals as of 21 October 2023 ‡ National team caps and goals as of 16 August 2022

Yirleidis Quejada Minota (born 10 November 2002), known as Yirleidis Minota, is a Colombian professional footballer who plays as a left-back for Liga MX Femenil club Pachuca and the Colombia national team.

From Carepa in Antioquia's Urabá region, Minota played for Formas Íntimas, Independiente Medellín, Peru's Alianza Lima and Atlético Nacional, with whom she finished third in the 2023 Copa Libertadores Femenina. She joined Pachuca in 2024 and was part of the squad that won the club's first league title in the Clausura 2025.

As an under-20 international she won the 2022 Bolivarian Games and played at the 2022 FIFA U-20 Women's World Cup. At senior level she was selected for the 2024 Summer Olympics, was a runner-up at the 2025 Copa América Femenina, and was part of the squad that won the inaugural CONMEBOL Women's Nations League in 2026.

== Club career ==
=== Early career in Colombia and Peru ===
Born in Carepa, Minota made her senior debut for Formas Íntimas in 2019. She then played for Independiente Medellín before moving abroad for the first time in 2022 to join Alianza Lima in Peru.

=== Atlético Nacional ===
Minota returned to Colombia in 2023 with Atlético Nacional, making 16 league appearances and scoring three goals. Nacional reached the semi-finals of the 2023 Copa Libertadores Femenina, where they were eliminated by Palmeiras. She played in the third-place match against Internacional at the Estadio Pascual Guerrero in Cali on 21 October 2023, prominent early on with her runs down the left, as Nacional won 3–2.

=== Pachuca ===
In January 2024, Minota signed for Mexican club Pachuca, joining her Colombia teammate Catalina Usme. In her first season, the club reached the semi-finals of the Clausura 2024.

By early 2025, Criterio Hidalgo described her as a key piece of Pachuca's side, citing her consistent form in the league. That season, Pachuca won their first Liga MX Femenil title, beating América 3–2 on aggregate in the Clausura 2025 final, which ended on 12 May 2025. She missed Pachuca's 1–0 win over Monterrey in the Campeón de Campeonas match in San Antonio, Texas, on 16 July 2025, because she was with Colombia at the Copa América.

In the 2025–26 CONCACAF W Champions Cup, Pachuca finished second in their group to reach the finals, which they hosted at the Estadio Hidalgo. Minota played in the 1–0 semi-final defeat to the Washington Spirit, and Pachuca beat Gotham FC 3–0 in the third-place match on 23 May 2026.

== International career ==
=== Youth ===
Minota represented Colombia's under-20 team in 2022. She won gold at the 2022 Bolivarian Games in Valledupar, where Colombia beat Venezuela 3–0 in the final. She then played at the 2022 FIFA U-20 Women's World Cup in Costa Rica, where Colombia beat Germany 1–0, drew with Mexico and New Zealand, and lost 1–0 to Brazil in the quarter-finals. Wearing the number 11, she won bronze at the 2022 South American Games in Asunción after a 1–0 win over Paraguay on 11 October 2022.

=== Senior ===
Minota was named in Colombia's squad for the 2024 Summer Olympics in France, her first Olympic Games. Colombia reached the quarter-finals, where they lost to Spain on penalties after a 2–2 draw.

In February 2025, she was called up for the 2025 SheBelieves Cup as part of Colombia's preparation for the 2025 Copa América Femenina. She wore the number 19 at the Copa América in Ecuador, where Colombia finished as runners-up after losing the final to Brazil on penalties.

Under head coach Ángelo Marsiglia, Minota was selected for the opening matchdays of the 2025–26 CONMEBOL Women's Nations League in October 2025. She was also named for the 2026 SheBelieves Cup. In June 2026, she was named for the final two Nations League matchdays, against Uruguay and Paraguay. Colombia won the competition unbeaten, clinching the title with a 4–3 win over Paraguay in Asunción on 9 June 2026 to qualify directly for the 2027 FIFA Women's World Cup.

== Style of play ==
Minota is a left-back who is strong in the air at both ends of the pitch and likes to get forward down the left flank.

== Honours ==
Pachuca

- Liga MX Femenil: Clausura 2025

Colombia U20

- Bolivarian Games gold medal: 2022
- South American Games bronze medal: 2022

Colombia

- CONMEBOL Women's Nations League: 2025–26
- Copa América Femenina runner-up: 2025
