= Jorelyn Carabalí =

Colombian footballer (born 1997)

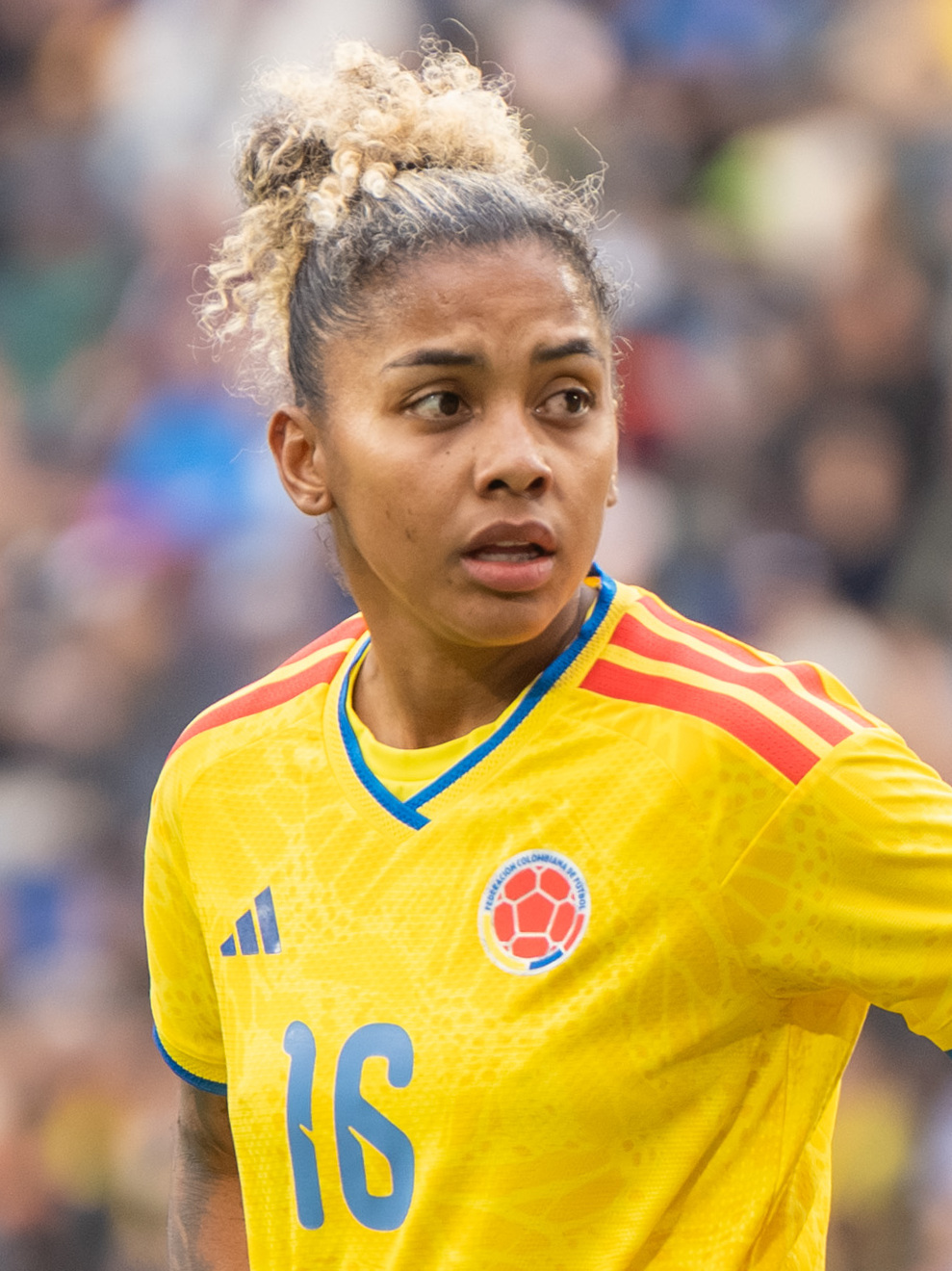
- Carabalí with Colombia in 2026

Personal information
- Full name: Jorelyn Daniela Carabalí Martínez
- Date of birth: 18 May 1997 (age 29)
- Place of birth: Jamundí, Colombia
- Height: 1.70 m (5 ft 7 in)
- Position: Centre-back

Team information
- Current team: Boston Legacy
- Number: 16

Senior career*
Years	Team	Apps	(Gls)
2017	Orsomarso		
2018–2019	Atlético Huila		
2020–2023	Deportivo Cali	34	(4)
2023	Atlético Mineiro	10	(3)
2023–2025	Brighton & Hove Albion	26	(0)
2026–	Boston Legacy	26	(0)

International career^{‡}
2021–	Colombia	42	(0)
Medal record
Women's football
Representing Colombia
CONMEBOL Women's Nations League
Gold medal – first place	2025–26
Copa América Femenina
Runner-up	2022 Colombia
Silver medal – second place	2025 Ecuador
- * Club domestic league appearances and goals as of 03:21, 4 November 2026 (UTC) ‡ National team caps and goals as of 3 July 2025

Jorelyn Daniela Carabalí Martínez (Latin American Spanish: [ˈɟʝoɾ(e)lin daˈnjela kaɾaβaˈli maɾˈtines]; born 18 May 1997) is a Colombian professional footballer who plays as a centre-back for Boston Legacy FC of the National Women's Soccer League (NWSL) and the Colombia national team.

Carabalí turned professional with Orsomarso in 2017 and joined Atlético Huila the following year, but a fractured femur sustained in April 2018 required four operations and kept her out of football for around two and a half years. She rebuilt her career at Deportivo Cali, where she was a regular in the unbeaten side that won the club's first Liga Femenina title in 2021, and then moved abroad to Atlético Mineiro in Brazil, Brighton & Hove Albion in England and, in 2026, Boston Legacy.

A Colombia international since 2021, Carabalí started every match as her country reached the quarter-finals of the 2023 FIFA Women's World Cup and played at the 2024 Summer Olympics. She finished as a runner-up at the 2022 and 2025 editions of the Copa América Femenina and was part of the squad that won the inaugural CONMEBOL Women's Nations League in 2026.

== Early life ==
Carabalí grew up in Cauca, where she played street football with both girls and boys. Teachers who noticed her ability helped her join a training centre in Santander de Quilichao, where she spent about three years, and she later gained a place at the Sarmiento Lora football school in Cali.

== Club career ==
=== Orsomarso ===
Carabalí made her professional debut with Orsomarso in 2017.

=== Atlético Huila ===
Atlético Huila signed Carabalí as a centre-back for the 2018 season, shortly after she had captained Colombia on her under-20 debut. On 28 April 2018 she fractured her femur in training. It was the first serious injury of her career, and the first operation left her with a hip problem; she had four operations in all, spent eight months learning to walk again and was out of competition for roughly two and a half years. She later recalled being told that she would not play professionally again and might manage only amateur football, and said of the experience that it had taught her to know herself and to overcome adversity.

=== Deportivo Cali ===
Carabalí joined Deportivo Cali in 2020 after completing her recovery, and by the following season had become a regular in the side. Cali went through the 2021 Liga Femenina unbeaten, winning nine of its 14 matches and drawing the other five, and took the club's first women's league title by beating Independiente Santa Fe 6–3 on aggregate in the final: 4–1 at El Campín on 7 September and 2–2 at Palmaseca five days later. She made 34 league appearances and scored four goals across three seasons with the club.

=== Atlético Mineiro ===
In January 2023, Carabalí joined Brazilian club Atlético Mineiro, scoring three goals in ten Brasileirão appearances in her single season there.

=== Brighton & Hove Albion ===
On 13 September 2023, Women's Super League club Brighton & Hove Albion announced Carabalí's signing, her first move to Europe. Head coach Melissa Phillips said the club had seen from her World Cup performances "that she has so much to offer in terms of her ability and mentality". Carabalí said that reaching the 2022 Copa América final had convinced her she could compete at that level, described the WSL as "a very competitive league" and set out to establish herself in the side. She made 26 league appearances over three seasons on the south coast, playing 13 times in each of her first two campaigns before featuring only in the League Cup in the first half of 2025–26.

=== Boston Legacy ===
Carabalí with the Boston Legacy in 2026

On 7 January 2026, NWSL expansion club Boston Legacy FC signed Carabalí from Brighton on a two-year contract with a club option for a further year, ahead of its first season. General manager Domè Guasch said that she brought "tactical intelligence and versatility across the back line", while Carabalí called the NWSL "one of the top leagues in the world" and spoke of helping to build "a new history".

Carabalí featured in Boston's inaugural home match, a 1–0 defeat by Gotham FC at Gillette Stadium watched by 30,207 spectators, a league record for an expansion club's home opener. She started at centre-back in the club's first away fixture on 21 March, a 3–0 defeat at the Houston Dash.

== International career ==
Carabalí captained Colombia on her debut for the under-20 team, against Peru, shortly before the injury that interrupted her career. She made her senior debut on 18 January 2021 in a friendly defeat by the United States.

On 3 July 2022, Nelson Abadía named Carabalí in the squad for the 2022 Copa América Femenina, held in Colombia. The team reached the final, losing 1–0 to Brazil; Carabalí later said the run had shown both the depth of Colombian talent coming through and that she could play at that level.

Called up on 4 July 2023 for the 2023 FIFA Women's World Cup, Carabalí started all five of Colombia's matches in Australia and New Zealand. The team beat South Korea 2–0 and Germany 2–1 and won its group despite a defeat by Morocco, then knocked out Jamaica in the round of 16 before losing to England in the quarter-finals. She had been in tears during the national anthem before the opening win over South Korea, later saying she had released everything she had held in since learning she was in the squad.

Carabalí was named in Colombia's squad for the 2024 CONCACAF W Gold Cup and, on 5 July 2024, for the 2024 Summer Olympics in Paris. Colombia again reached the quarter-finals, going out to Spain 4–2 on penalties after a 2–2 draw. She was a runner-up for a second time at the 2025 Copa América Femenina, where Colombia lost the final to Brazil on penalties.

In May 2026, Ángelo Marsiglia included Carabalí in the squad for Colombia's closing CONMEBOL Women's Nations League fixtures, against Uruguay in Cali and Paraguay in Asunción. Colombia won the inaugural edition of the competition with a 4–3 victory over Paraguay at the Estadio Defensores del Chaco on 10 June 2026, a result that also secured automatic qualification for the 2027 FIFA Women's World Cup.

== Career statistics ==
=== Club ===
As of match played 12 November 2025.

Appearances and goals by club, season and competition
Club	Season	League			National Cup		League Cup		Total	
Club	Season	Division	Apps	Goals	Apps	Goals	Apps	Goals	Apps	Goals
Deportivo Cali	2021	Liga Femenina	14	1	—		—		14	1
Deportivo Cali	2022	Liga Femenina	20	3	—		—		20	3
Deportivo Cali	Total		34	4	—		—		34	4
Atlético Mineiro	2023	Brasileirão Feminino	10	3	—		—		10	3
Brighton & Hove Albion	2023–24	WSL	13	0	2	0	3	1	18	1
Brighton & Hove Albion	2024–25	WSL	13	0	2	0	4	0	19	0
Brighton & Hove Albion	2025–26	WSL	0	0	0	0	4	0	4	0
Brighton & Hove Albion	Total		26	0	4	0	11	1	41	1
Career total			70	7	4	0	11	1	85	8

== Honours ==
Deportivo Cali

- Liga Femenina Profesional: 2021

Colombia

- CONMEBOL Women's Nations League: 2025–26
- Copa América Femenina runner-up: 2022, 2025
