= Mary Álvarez =

Colombian footballer (born 2005)

Personal information
- Full name: Mary José Álvarez Espitaleta
- Date of birth: 22 August 2005 (age 21)
- Place of birth: Cartagena, Colombia
- Height: 1.70 m (5 ft 7 in)
- Position: Defender

Team information
- Current team: Al Qadsiah

Senior career*
Years	Team	Apps	(Gls)
2022	Independiente Medellín	4	(0)
2023–2025	Atlético Nacional	44	(2)
2026	Les Marseillaises	5	(0)
2026–	Al Qadsiah	0	(0)

International career^{‡}
2022	Colombia U-17	6	(0)
2022–2024	Colombia U-20	26	(3)
2025–	Colombia	9	(0)
Medal record
Women's football
Representing Colombia
Copa América Femenina
Silver medal – second place	2025 Ecuador
- * Club domestic league appearances and goals ‡ National team caps and goals as of 19 April 2026

Mary José Álvarez Espitaleta (born 22 August 2005) is a Colombian professional footballer who plays as a defender for Saudi Women's Premier League club Al Qadsiah and the Colombia national team.

== Early life ==
Álvarez was born in Cartagena. She started out playing street football before joining mixed team Bechara FC. She then played with men's teams in the Liga de Fútbol de Bolívar and progressed to La Villa FC and Formas Íntimas.

== Club career ==
Álvarez joined Les Marseillaises from Atlético Nacional. In September 2026, she joined Saudi Arabian side Al Qadsiah on contract through 2029.

== International career ==
Álvarez represented Colombia at the 2022 FIFA U-17 Women's World Cup, 2022 FIFA U-20 Women's World Cup, and 2024 FIFA U-20 Women's World Cup. She played almost every minute of the 2022 FIFA U-17 Women's World Cup as Colombia reached the title game. She was ever-present during the 2024 FIFA U-20 Women's World Cup, scoring in a 1–0 win against Mexico during the group stage, as Colombia reached the quarterfinals on home soil.

Álvarez made her senior debut on 23 February 2025, starting in a 1–4 loss against Japan in the 2025 SheBelieves Cup.
