= Ilana Izquierdo =

Colombian footballer (born 2002)

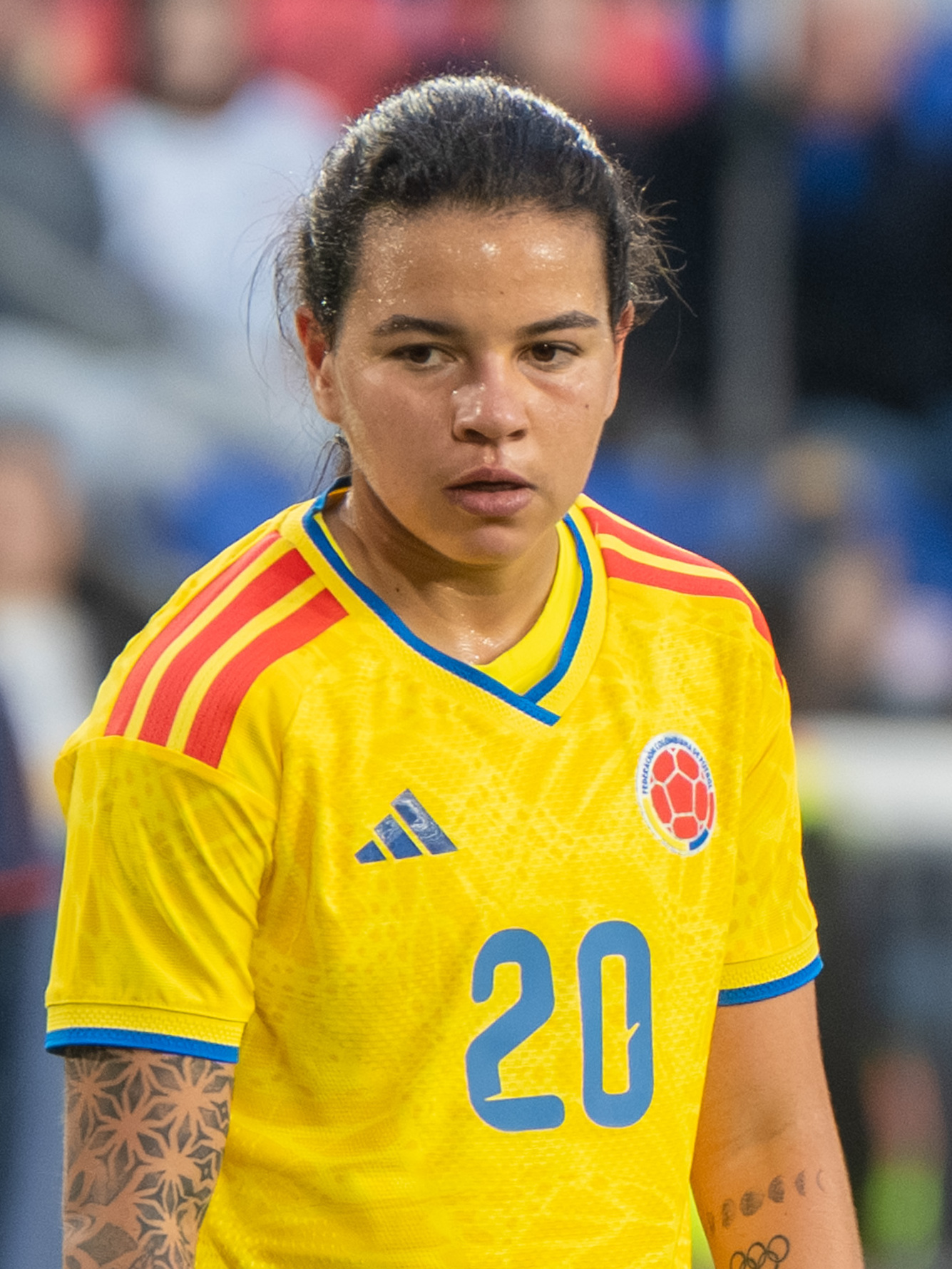

Personal information
- Full name: Ilana Izquierdo Zanger
- Date of birth: June 14, 2002 (age 24)
- Place of birth: Cali, Colombia
- Height: 1.58 m (5 ft 2 in)
- Position: Midfielder

Team information
- Current team: Tigres UANL
- Number: 21

Youth career
- Club Atlas

College career
Years	Team	Apps	(Gls)
2021–2022	Southern Miss Golden Eagles	32	(9)
2023–2024	Mississippi State Bulldogs	38	(6)

Senior career*
Years	Team	Apps	(Gls)
2023–2024	Asheville City SC		
2025	Atlético San Luis	12	(2)
2026–	Tigres UANL	9	(0)

International career^{‡}
2018	Colombia U17		
2021–2022	Colombia U20		
2024–	Colombia		
Medal record
Women's football
Copa América Femenina
Silver medal – second place	2025 Ecuador	Team
Bolivarian Games
Gold medal – first place	2022 Valledupar	Team
- * Club domestic league appearances and goals as of May 3, 2026 ‡ National team caps and goals as of June 9, 2026

Ilana Izquierdo Zanger (born June 14, 2002) is a Colombian professional footballer who plays as a midfielder for Liga MX Femenil club Tigres UANL and the Colombia national team.

Raised in Cali, Izquierdo was registered with the Valle del Cauca club Atlas when she was named in Colombia's squad for the 2018 FIFA U-17 Women's World Cup. She then spent four years in college soccer in the United States, winning Conference USA Freshman of the Year at Southern Miss in 2021 and joining the Mississippi State side that took the program's first Southeastern Conference regular-season title in 2024. After two summers in the USL W League with Asheville City SC, she turned professional with Atlético San Luis in 2025 and moved to Tigres UANL for the 2026 Clausura.

Izquierdo won a gold medal with Colombia's under-20 team at the 2022 Bolivarian Games and played at the 2022 FIFA U-20 Women's World Cup. She made her senior debut at the 2024 CONCACAF W Gold Cup and was selected five months later for the 2024 Olympic tournament, where she and goalkeeper Catalina Pérez became Mississippi State's first Olympians in the sport. She finished as a runner-up at the 2025 Copa América Femenina and started the match that decided the 2025–26 CONMEBOL Women's Nations League, which Colombia won.

== Early life ==
Izquierdo was born on June 14, 2002, in Cali, in the department of Valle del Cauca. She played her youth football for Club Atlas in the Valle del Cauca regional league and finished school at Colegio Coomeva in Cali in 2020 before taking up a scholarship in the United States.

== College career ==
=== Southern Miss ===
Izquierdo enrolled at the University of Southern Mississippi in 2021 and started all 17 of the Golden Eagles' matches as a freshman, playing 1,619 minutes and leading the team with seven goals and seven assists. She was named Conference USA Freshman of the Year and selected for the conference's first team, all-freshman team and all-tournament team, as well as the United Soccer Coaches All-South Region second team.

Southern Miss moved to the Sun Belt Conference for the 2022 season, which Izquierdo began late after Colombia's run to the quarter-finals of the U-20 World Cup. She appeared in 15 of the team's 16 matches, scored twice and was named to the second team all-Sun Belt.

=== Mississippi State ===
Izquierdo transferred to Mississippi State University for the 2023 season and started all 23 matches, leading the team in assists and logging 2,097 minutes, a program record for a junior. She scored twice against Florida International, again against LSU, and converted the winning penalty in the Magnolia Cup against Ole Miss.

She opened the 2024 season by scoring inside three minutes in a 1–0 win over Baylor on August 15. Mississippi State went 10–0–0 in conference play to win the program's first SEC regular-season championship, clinching the title with a 2–0 win at Texas A&M on October 27 and becoming only the fourth team in conference history to complete an unbeaten SEC campaign. The Bulldogs finished 19–3–0, the highest win total in program history, and reached the NCAA tournament round of 16, where they lost 2–0 at home to Notre Dame on November 24. Izquierdo started 15 matches for 1,238 minutes across the season and was named to the second team all-SEC.

== Club career ==
=== Asheville City ===
Izquierdo spent the 2023 and 2024 USL W League summers with Asheville City SC in North Carolina. In 2024 she featured in the 4–1 win over Tennessee SC that secured the club's first national playoff berth, then left for the Olympic tournament before the playoffs began.

=== Atlético San Luis ===
On June 13, 2025, Atlético San Luis announced Izquierdo as the first signing of its women's team ahead of the 2025 Apertura, her first professional contract. She was unavailable for the club's opening five league matches while on duty at the Copa América, and started each of the next five on her return. She scored her first professional goal on October 13, 2025, controlling the ball in the area and lifting a left-footed finish into the top corner in the 67th minute to draw San Luis level in a 1–1 home draw with Toluca at the Estadio Alfonso Lastras. The club confirmed her departure on December 28, 2025, recording more than 1,000 minutes and two goals over the half-season.

=== Tigres UANL ===
Tigres UANL announced Izquierdo's signing on December 29, 2025, presenting her as a midfielder of "order, tactical intelligence and good ball handling" and a reinforcement for the 2026 Clausura. She took the number 21 shirt and made nine league appearances in a midfield that also contained Jennifer Hermoso, Stephany Mayor and Alexia Delgado. The defending champions were eliminated in the quarter-finals of the tournament, losing the second leg 2–1 to Toluca on May 3, 2026.

== International career ==
=== Youth ===
Izquierdo was 16 when she was named in Colombia's squad for the 2018 FIFA U-17 Women's World Cup in Uruguay, one of three players called up from Club Atlas alongside Gisela Robledo and Elizabeth Carabalí.

At the 2022 South American Under-20 Women's Football Championship in Chile she headed Colombia in front in the eighth minute against Uruguay on April 24, 2022, in a 3–0 win that confirmed the team's place at the U-20 World Cup. Two months later she scored in the Bolivarian Games final on June 28, a 3–0 defeat of Venezuela in Valledupar that gave the under-20 side the gold medal. She then played at the 2022 FIFA U-20 Women's World Cup in Costa Rica, where Colombia reached the quarter-finals.

=== Senior ===
Izquierdo was called into the senior squad for the inaugural 2024 CONCACAF W Gold Cup and made her debut on February 21, 2024, in a 6–0 group-stage win over Panama at Snapdragon Stadium in San Diego. She also featured against Brazil and Puerto Rico before Colombia lost 3–0 to the United States in the quarter-finals on March 3.

Five months after that debut she was named in Colombia's squad for the 2024 Olympic tournament; she and goalkeeper Catalina Pérez were the first Mississippi State footballers to reach the Olympics. Colombia were eliminated in the quarter-finals.

At the 2025 Copa América Femenina in Ecuador, Izquierdo started the goalless group-stage draws with Venezuela and Brazil and the semi-final against Argentina, which Colombia won on penalties. Brazil beat Colombia in a penalty shoot-out in the final in Quito on August 2, 2025.

Izquierdo was recalled for the closing rounds of the 2025–26 CONMEBOL Women's Nations League and started the decisive final-round fixture away to Paraguay on June 9, 2026. Colombia recovered from two goals down to win 4–3 at the Estadio Defensores del Chaco in Asunción, taking the inaugural title and qualifying for the 2027 FIFA Women's World Cup.

== Honours ==
Mississippi State Bulldogs

- Southeastern Conference regular season: 2024

Colombia U20

- Bolivarian Games gold medal: 2022

Colombia

- CONMEBOL Women's Nations League: 2025–26
- Copa América Femenina runner-up: 2025

Individual

- Conference USA Freshman of the Year: 2021
- Conference USA First Team: 2021
- Conference USA All-Freshman Team: 2021
- United Soccer Coaches All-South Region Second Team: 2021
- Second-team All-Sun Belt: 2022
- Second-team All-SEC: 2024
