= Ángela Barón =

Colombian footballer (born 2003)

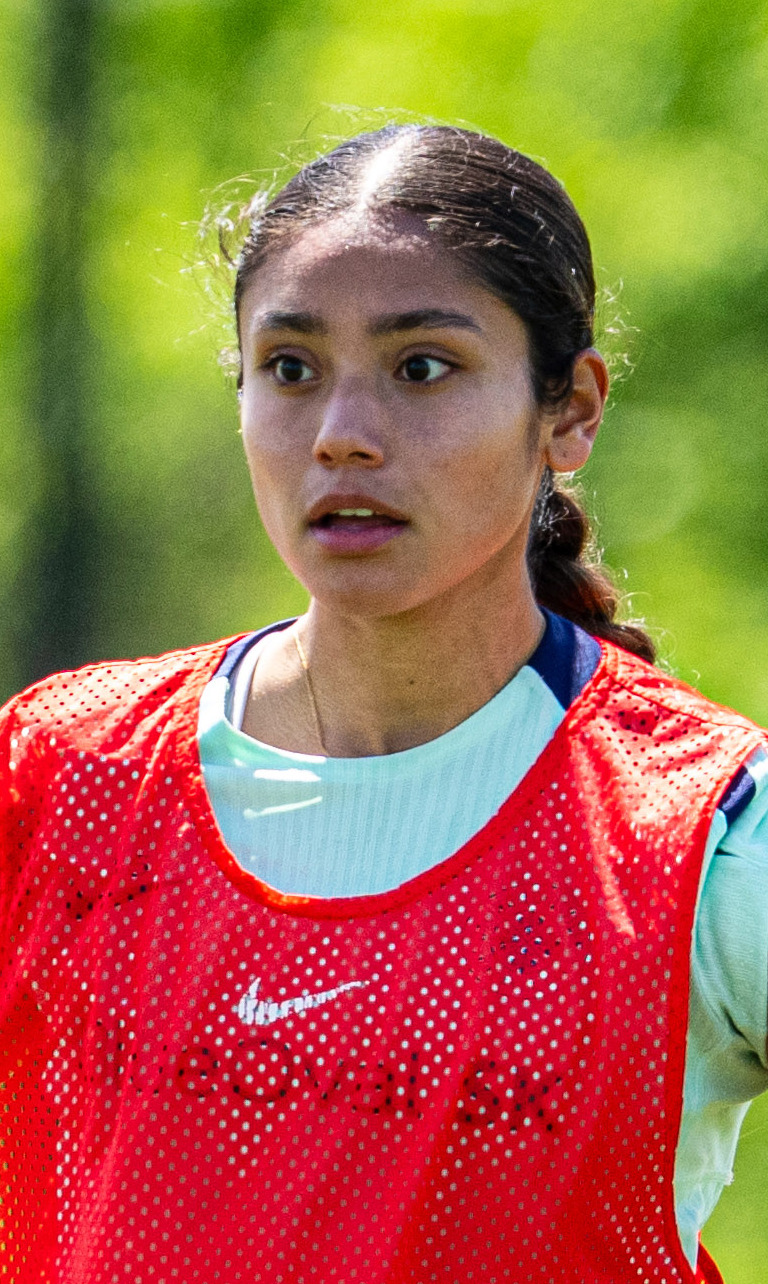
- Barón training with Racing Louisville in 2025

Personal information
- Full name: Ángela Daniela Barón
- Date of birth: 18 September 2003 (age 23)
- Place of birth: Keller, Texas, U.S.
- Height: 1.70 m (5 ft 7 in)
- Position: Centre-back

Team information
- Current team: Le Havre
- Number: 3

Youth career
- D'Feeters Kicks

College career
Years	Team	Apps	(Gls)
2022	Arizona Wildcats	12	(0)

Senior career*
Years	Team	Apps	(Gls)
2023–2024	Atlético Nacional	33	(1)
2024–2025	Racing Louisville FC	1	(0)
2025–	Le Havre	16	(0)

International career^{‡}
2022	Colombia U20	11	(0)
2021–	Colombia	16	(0)
Medal record
Women's association football
Representing Colombia
CONMEBOL Women's Nations League
Gold medal – first place	2025–26	Team
Copa América Femenina
Silver medal – second place	2022 Colombia	Team
Silver medal – second place	2025 Ecuador	Team
Bolivarian Games
Gold medal – first place	2022 Valledupar	Team
South American Under-20 Women's Football Championship
Silver medal – second place	2022 Chile	Team
- * Club domestic league appearances and goals as of 13:55, 5 August 2026 (UTC) ‡ National team caps and goals as of 07:23, 10 December 2025 (UTC)

Ángela Daniela Barón (born 18 September 2003) is a professional footballer who plays as a centre-back for French Première Ligue club Le Havre. Born in the United States to a Colombian mother, she represents the Colombia national team.

Barón previously played college soccer for the Arizona Wildcats and professionally for Atlético Nacional and Racing Louisville FC. She was part of Colombia's squads at the 2023 FIFA Women's World Cup and the 2024 Summer Olympics, and was a Copa América Femenina runner-up in 2022 and 2025. She was also part of the Colombian team that won the inaugural 2025–26 CONMEBOL Women's Nations League, the country's first senior women's title in a competition organised by CONMEBOL.

== Early life ==
Barón was born in Keller, Texas, to an American father and a Colombian mother from Bogotá. She attended Keller High School, where she was twice named to the all-district first team. At club level, she played for the Elite Clubs National League programme of D'Feeters Kicks SC.

== College career ==
Barón joined the Arizona Wildcats of the University of Arizona in 2022. She started all 12 matches in which she appeared and played 985 minutes, averaging fewer than eight minutes off the field per appearance. She recorded five shots and one assist, with the assist coming in a 1–0 victory over the UC Davis Aggies.

== Club career ==
=== Atlético Nacional ===
In early 2023, Barón left college soccer and joined Colombian club Atlético Nacional, beginning her professional club career. During her first season, Nacional reached the semi-finals of the 2023 Copa Libertadores Femenina, where the club lost 3–1 to defending champions Palmeiras. Nacional subsequently defeated Internacional 3–2 in the third-place play-off, securing the club's best finish in the competition.

Barón remained with Nacional for the 2024 season, during which the club finished first in the opening stage of the Colombian championship.

=== Racing Louisville ===
On 20 August 2024, National Women's Soccer League club Racing Louisville FC announced the signing of Barón on a contract through the 2026 season. Louisville completed the transfer by agreeing to provide Atlético Nacional with future considerations.

Barón made her only competitive appearance for Racing as a substitute against San Diego Wave FC in the club's final match of the 2024 season, playing the final 12 minutes. She did not make an appearance during the 2025 NWSL season. On 22 September 2025, Racing and Barón mutually agreed to terminate the remainder of her contract, allowing her to pursue opportunities elsewhere.

=== Le Havre ===
In October 2025, Barón moved to France and signed for Première Ligue club Le Havre.

== International career ==
Barón was eligible to represent both the United States, where she was born, and Colombia through her mother. She ultimately elected to represent Colombia internationally.

=== Youth ===
In 2022, Barón established herself as a starting centre-back for the Colombia under-20 team. She helped Colombia finish second at the 2022 South American Under-20 Women's Football Championship, securing qualification for the 2022 FIFA U-20 Women's World Cup in Costa Rica.

Barón was subsequently selected for the under-20 team that contested the 2022 Bolivarian Games in Valledupar. Colombia won the gold medal after defeating Venezuela, Paraguay and Panama during the tournament.

At the 2022 FIFA U-20 Women's World Cup, Barón started each of Colombia's matches. Colombia finished first in its group and advanced to the quarter-finals before being eliminated by Brazil.

=== Senior ===
Barón received her first senior national-team call-up in March 2021, when coach Nelson Abadía selected her for two friendly matches against Ecuador in Quito on 10 and 13 April.

On 3 July 2022, Barón was named to Colombia's squad for the 2022 Copa América Femenina on home soil. Colombia reached the final, where the team finished as runners-up after losing 1–0 to Brazil.

On 4 July 2023, Barón was included in Colombia's 23-player squad for the 2023 FIFA Women's World Cup in Australia and New Zealand. Colombia won its group and advanced to the quarter-finals, recording the country's best result at a senior Women's World Cup.

In February 2024, Barón was named to the Colombia squad for the inaugural 2024 CONCACAF W Gold Cup. Later that year, she was selected to represent Colombia at the 2024 Summer Olympics in France. Colombia reached the Olympic quarter-finals for the first time before being eliminated by Spain in a penalty shoot-out.

Barón was selected for the 2025 Copa América Femenina in Ecuador. Colombia reached its second consecutive final, drawing 4–4 with Brazil before losing 5–4 in the ensuing penalty shoot-out.

In May 2026, Barón was called up for Colombia's final two fixtures in the inaugural 2025–26 CONMEBOL Women's Nations League. Colombia secured the championship by defeating Paraguay 4–3 in Asunción on the final matchday, finishing the tournament unbeaten and qualifying directly for the 2027 FIFA Women's World Cup. The title was Colombia's first at senior women's level in a competition organised by CONMEBOL.

== Honours ==
Colombia

- CONMEBOL Women's Nations League: 2025–26
- Copa América Femenina runner-up: 2022, 2025

Colombia U20

- Bolivarian Games gold medal: 2022
- South American Under-20 Women's Football Championship runner-up: 2022
