= Ángelo Marsiglia =

Colombian association football manager

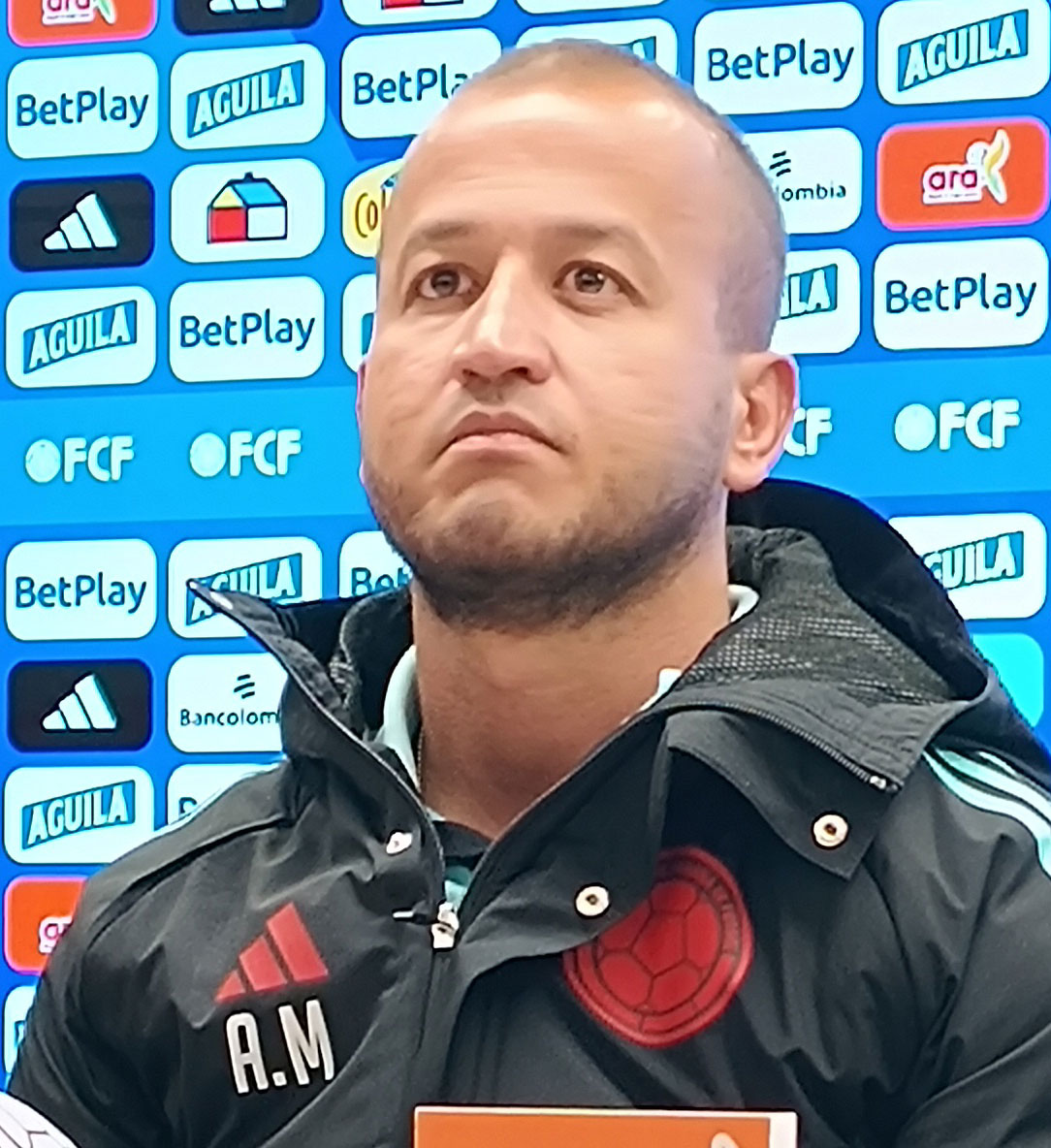
- Marsiglia with Colombia in 2023

Personal information
- Full name: Ángelo Adolfo Marsiglia Olivares
- Date of birth: 20 December 1985 (age 40)

Team information
- Current team: Colombia (women) (manager)

Managerial career
- Years: Team
- 2022–2023: Colombia (women) (assistant)
- 2023–: Colombia (women)

Ángelo Adolfo Marsiglia Olivares (born 20 December 1985) is a Colombian football manager who is currently the head coach of the Colombia women's national team.
