= 2018 Copa América Femenina squads =

This article describes about the squads for the 2018 Copa América Femenina.

== Group A ==
=== Chile ===
The squad was announced on 24 March 2018.

Head coach: José Letelier

No.	Pos.	Player	Date of birth (age)	Caps	Club
1	GK	Christiane Endler (captain)	23 July 1991 (aged 26)		(France) PSG
12	GK	Natalia Campos	12 January 1992 (aged 26)		(Chile) Universidad Católica
22	GK	Carolina Armijo	28 November 1987 (aged 30)		(Colombia) Cúcuta Deportivo
2	DF	Rocío Soto	21 September 1993 (aged 24)		(Chile) Colo-Colo
3	DF	Carla Guerrero	23 December 1987 (aged 30)		(Colombia) Santa Fe
5	DF	Ámbar Soruco	3 March 1996 (aged 22)		Universidad de Chile
14	DF	Fernanda Pinilla	6 November 1993 (aged 24)		Universidad de Chile
15	DF	Su Helen Galaz	27 May 1991 (aged 26)		(Chile) Santiago Morning
17	DF	Geraldine Leyton	11 May 1989 (aged 28)		(Chile) Colo-Colo
18	DF	Camila Sáez	17 October 1994 (aged 23)		(Spain) Tacón
4	MF	Francisca Lara	29 July 1990 (aged 27)		(Spain) Sporting Huelva
6	MF	Claudia Soto	6 July 1993 (aged 24)		(Brazil) Corinthians/Audax
8	MF	Karen Araya	16 October 1990 (aged 27)		(Brazil) Corinthians/Audax
11	MF	Yesenia López	20 October 1990 (aged 27)		(Brazil) 3B Amazônia
16	MF	Ana Gutiérrez	20 June 1996 (aged 21)		(Chile) Colo-Colo
7	FW	María José Rojas	17 December 1987 (aged 30)		(Japan) Orca Kamogawa
9	FW	Nathalie Quezada	21 June 1989 (aged 28)		(Chile) Colo-Colo
10	FW	Yanara Aedo	5 August 1993 (aged 24)		(United States) Washington Spirit
13	FW	Javiera Grez	11 July 2000 (aged 17)		(Chile) Curicó Unido
19	FW	Yessenia Huenteo	30 October 1992 (aged 25)		(Chile) Colo-Colo
20	FW	Maryorie Hernández	20 March 1990 (aged 28)		(Chile) Palestino
21	FW	María José Urrutia	17 December 1993 (aged 24)		(Chile) Universidad Católica

=== Colombia ===
Head coach: Nelson Abadía

No.	Pos.	Player	Date of birth (age)	Caps	Club
1	GK	Vanessa Córdoba	9 May 1995 (aged 22)		(Colombia) La Equidad
	GK	Stefany Castaño	11 January 1994 (aged 24)		(Colombia) Patriotas Boyacá
12	GK	Sandra Sepúlveda	3 March 1988 (aged 30)		(Colombia) Junior
13	DF	Angela Clavijo	1 September 1993 (aged 24)		(Colombia) América de Cali
	DF	Daniela Caracas	25 April 1997 (aged 20)		(Colombia) Atlético Huila
20	DF	Liana Salazar	16 September 1992 (aged 25)		(Colombia) Santa Fe
3	DF	Daniela Arias	31 August 1994 (aged 23)		(Colombia) Atlético Bucaramanga
17	DF	Carolina Arias	2 September 1990 (aged 27)		(Colombia) Atlético Nacional
2	DF	Manuela Vanegas	9 November 2000 (aged 17)		(Colombia) Envigado
9	DF	Oriánica Velásquez	1 August 1989 (aged 28)		(Colombia) Envigado
15	DF	Isabella Echeverri	16 June 1994 (aged 23)		(United States) University of Toledo
8	MF	Jessica Caro	20 July 1988 (aged 29)		(Colombia) Cortuluá
19	MF	Marcela Restrepo	10 November 1995 (aged 22)		(Colombia) Cortuluá
10	MF	Yoreli Rincón	27 July 1993 (aged 24)		(Colombia) Atlético Huila
7	MF	Leicy Santos	16 May 1996 (aged 21)		(Colombia) Santa Fe
	MF	Ana Huertas	17 June 1991 (aged 26)		(Colombia) Santa Fe
4	MF	Diana Ospina	3 March 1989 (aged 29)		(Colombia) Envigado
6	MF	Daniela Montoya (captain)	22 August 1990 (aged 27)		(Colombia) Junior
11	FW	Catalina Usme	25 December 1989 (aged 28)		(Colombia) América de Cali
	FW	Manuela González	29 August 1995 (aged 22)		(Colombia) Atlético Bucaramanga
	FW	Valentina Restrepo	30 August 1997 (aged 20)		(Colombia) Envigado
21	FW	Yisela Cuesta	27 September 1991 (aged 26)		(Colombia) Envigado

=== Paraguay ===
Head coach: Rubén Subeldía

No.	Pos.	Player	Date of birth (age)	Caps	Club
1	GK	Cristina Recalde	29 September 1994 (aged 23)		(Paraguay) UAA
12	GK	Gloria Saleb	12 June 1991 (aged 26)		(Paraguay) Cerro Porteño
22	GK	Alicia Bobadilla	5 June 1994 (aged 23)		(Paraguay) Deportivo Capiatá
2	DF	Marlene Mendoza	5 April 1994 (aged 23)		(Paraguay) Cerro Porteño
3	DF	Carmen Benítez	5 April 1986 (aged 31)		(Paraguay) Sportivo Limpeño
4	DF	Limpia Fretes	24 June 2000 (aged 17)		(Paraguay) Cerro Porteño
5	DF	Paola Genes	14 June 1991 (aged 26)		(Paraguay) Cerro Porteño
8	DF	Verónica Riveros (captain)	23 April 1987 (aged 30)		(Brazil) Foz Cataratas
15	DF	Tania Riso	26 January 1994 (aged 24)		(Paraguay) Sportivo Limpeño
6	MF	Damia Cortaza	29 September 1993 (aged 24)		(Paraguay) Sportivo Limpeño
7	MF	Joana Galeano	9 August 1988 (aged 29)		(Paraguay) Sportivo Limpeño
11	MF	Liz Peña	15 June 1995 (aged 22)		(Paraguay) Sportivo Limpeño
13	MF	Fanny Godoy	21 January 1998 (aged 20)		(Paraguay) UAA
16	MF	Ramona Martínez	21 July 1996 (aged 21)		(Paraguay) Deportivo Capiatá
17	MF	Soledad Garay	27 November 1996 (aged 21)		(Paraguay) UAA
19	MF	Rosa Miño	13 July 1999 (aged 18)		(Paraguay) Cerro Porteño
21	MF	Graciela Martínez	24 May 2001 (aged 16)		(Paraguay) Cerro Porteño
9	FW	Amada Peralta	14 June 1994 (aged 23)		(Paraguay) Cerro Porteño
10	FW	Jessica Martínez	14 June 1999 (aged 18)		(Brazil) Santos
14	FW	Gloria Villamayor	10 April 1992 (aged 25)		(Colombia) Patriotas Boyacá
18	FW	Fabiola Sandoval	27 May 1999 (aged 18)		(Paraguay) Sportivo Luqueño
20	FW	Lice Chamorro	22 December 1998 (aged 19)		(Paraguay) Cerro Porteño

=== Peru ===
The squad was announced on 28 March 2018.

Head coach: Vivian Ayres

No.	Pos.	Player	Date of birth (age)	Caps	Club
1	GK	Karla López	16 September 1998 (aged 19)		(Peru) Universitario
12	GK	Maryory Sánchez	7 April 1997 (aged 20)		(Peru) Sporting Cristal
21	GK	Sharol Taboada	5 November 1994 (aged 23)		(Peru) La Cantera
2	DF	Carmen Suárez	10 August 1995 (aged 22)		(Peru) JC Sport Girls
3	DF	Fiorella Machaca	14 February 2002 (aged 16)		(Peru) UNTAC
4	DF	Even Pizango	15 April 1993 (aged 24)		(Peru) Universitario
5	DF	Milagros Arruela (captain)	11 October 1992 (aged 25)		(Peru) El Agustino
7	DF	Odalys Rivas	9 October 1998 (aged 19)		(Peru) Universitario
13	DF	Katarina Comesaña	19 June 1992 (aged 25)		(Peru) El Agustino
14	DF	Lorena Cortez	19 February 1988 (aged 30)		(Peru) ML CF
17	DF	Aranxa Vega	26 August 1997 (aged 20)		(Peru) Universitario
6	MF	Claudia Cagnina	10 September 1997 (aged 20)		(United States) St. John's Red Storm
9	MF	Xioczana Canales	21 April 1999 (aged 18)		(Peru) JC Sport Girls
10	MF	Sandra Arévalo	14 April 1998 (aged 19)		(Peru) JC Sport Girls
11	MF	Nahomi Martínez	5 April 1997 (aged 20)		(Peru) Sporting Cristal
16	MF	María Valentín	13 October 1995 (aged 22)		(Peru) Sporting Cristal
19	MF	Kamila Cuchillo	8 November 1999 (aged 18)		(Peru) CAR Moquegua
20	MF	Esthefany Espino	16 August 1999 (aged 18)		(Peru) Universitario
22	MF	Milena Tomayconsa	28 September 2001 (aged 16)		(Peru) Unión Arequipa
8	FW	Julia Suárez	1 November 1996 (aged 21)		(United States) VCU Rams
15	FW	Ximena Solís	29 September 2001 (aged 16)		(Peru) La Cantera
18	FW	Pierina Núñez	13 March 2000 (aged 18)		(Peru) Universitario

*Diana Alfaro was originally announced in the squad by the Peruvian Football Federation, but was later withdrawn and replaced by Carmen Suárez before the start of the tournament.

=== Uruguay ===
Head coach: Ariel Longo

No.	Pos.	Player	Date of birth (age)	Caps	Club
1	GK	Josefina Villanueva	3 February 2000 (aged 18)		(Uruguay) Liverpool
12	GK	Sofía Olivera	17 January 2001 (aged 17)		(Uruguay) Peñarol
22	GK	Catia Gómez	12 July 2000 (aged 17)		(Uruguay) Peñarol
2	DF	Lucía Meyer	2 May 1999 (aged 18)		(Uruguay) Nacional
3	DF	Daiana Farías	25 January 1999 (aged 19)		(Uruguay) Peñarol
4	DF	Carina Felipe	3 March 1998 (aged 20)		(Uruguay) Nacional
7	DF	Stephanie Tregartten	9 September 1996 (aged 21)		(Uruguay) Unión Paysandú
14	DF	Valeria Colmán (captain)	25 May 1990 (aged 27)		(Uruguay) Nacional
15	DF	Pierina Montenegro	12 August 1986 (aged 31)		(Uruguay) Nacional
17	DF	Jemina Rolfo	20 February 1995 (aged 23)		(Uruguay) Peñarol
21	DF	Alexia Da Silva	21 December 2000 (aged 17)		(Uruguay) Peñarol
5	MF	Pamela González	28 September 1995 (aged 22)		(Spain) Málaga
6	MF	Sabrina Soravilla	25 August 1996 (aged 21)		(Uruguay) Nacional
8	MF	Ximena Velazco	31 July 1995 (aged 22)		(Uruguay) Peñarol
10	MF	Sindy Ramírez	28 January 1991 (aged 27)		(Argentina) San Lorenzo
16	MF	Stefany Suárez	13 August 1994 (aged 23)		(Uruguay) Peñarol
18	MF	Naiara Ferrari	24 June 1998 (aged 19)		(Uruguay) Nacional
19	MF	Giovanna Yun	18 July 1992 (aged 25)		(Uruguay) Nacional
9	FW	Carolina Birizamberri	9 July 1995 (aged 22)		(Argentina) River Plate
13	FW	Adriana Castillo	5 May 1990 (aged 27)		(Uruguay) Nacional
11	FW	Yamila Badell	1 March 1996 (aged 22)		(Spain) Tacón
20	FW	Catherin Berni	30 June 1994 (aged 23)		(Uruguay) Colón

== Group B ==
=== Argentina ===
Head coach: Carlos Borrello

No.	Pos.	Player	Date of birth (age)	Caps	Club
1	GK	Vanina Correa	14 August 1983 (aged 34)		(Argentina) Social Lux
12	GK	Laurina Oliveros	10 September 1993 (aged 24)		(Argentina) UAI Urquiza
22	GK	Gaby Garton	27 May 1990 (aged 27)		(Argentina) UAI Urquiza
2	DF	Agustina Barroso	20 May 1993 (aged 24)		(Brazil) Ferroviária
3	DF	Eliana Stábile	26 November 1990 (aged 27)		(Argentina) Boca Juniors
4	DF	Adriana Sachs	25 December 1993 (aged 24)		(Argentina) UAI Urquiza
8	DF	Ruth Bravo	6 March 1992 (aged 26)		(Argentina) Boca Juniors
10	DF	Florencia Bonsegundo (captain)	14 July 1993 (aged 24)		(Argentina) UAI Urquiza
13	DF	Mariela Coronel	20 June 1981 (aged 36)		(Spain) Granada
14	DF	Milagros Otazú	31 May 2001 (aged 16)		(Argentina) UAI Urquiza
16	DF	Valentina Cámara	18 November 1993 (aged 24)		(Argentina) Belgrano
17	DF	Natalie Juncos	28 December 1990 (aged 27)		(Argentina) UAI Urquiza
20	DF	Aldana Cometti	3 March 1996 (aged 22)		(Colombia) Huila
5	MF	Vanesa Santana	3 September 1990 (aged 27)		(Colombia) América de Cali
6	MF	Gabriela Chávez	9 April 1989 (aged 28)		(Argentina) Platense
11	MF	Estefanía Banini	21 June 1990 (aged 27)		(United States) Washington Spirit
19	MF	Mariana Larroquette	24 October 1992 (aged 25)		(Argentina) UAI Urquiza
7	FW	Amancay Urbani	7 December 1991 (aged 26)		(Argentina) Belgrano
9	FW	Sole Jaimes	20 January 1989 (aged 29)		(China) Dalian Quanjian
15	FW	María Belén Potassa	12 December 1988 (aged 29)		(Argentina) UAI Urquiza
18	FW	Yael Oviedo	22 May 1992 (aged 25)		(Spain) Granada
21	FW	Yamila Rodríguez	24 January 1998 (aged 20)		(Spain) Santa Teresa

=== Bolivia ===
The squad was announced on 31 March 2018.

Head coach: Weimar Delgado

No.	Pos.	Player	Date of birth (age)	Caps	Club
1	GK	Yoselin Aquino	28 December 1991 (aged 26)		Unattached
12	GK	Paola Álvarez	10 September 1990 (aged 27)		(Bolivia) San Martín de Porres
22	GK	Flavia Valdivia	18 December 1995 (aged 22)		Unattached
3	DF	María Laura Gómez	16 May 1993 (aged 24)		(Bolivia) San Martín de Porres
4	DF	Ericka Morales	17 December 1994 (aged 23)		(Bolivia) Deportivo Ita
5	DF	Danny Pedraza	30 July 1994 (aged 23)		Unattached
16	DF	Yamila Fernández	7 August 1986 (aged 31)		Unattached
6	MF	Neiza Flores	19 December 1989 (aged 28)		(Bolivia) Tecnología
7	MF	Ana Paola Andía	10 June 1999 (aged 18)		(Bolivia) Universidad
11	MF	Ana Paula Rojas	17 July 1997 (aged 20)		(Bolivia) San Martín de Porres
13	MF	Margarita Vargas	12 May 1995 (aged 22)		Unattached
14	MF	Karenth Zabala	10 July 1996 (aged 21)		Unattached
15	MF	Ángela Cárdenas	19 November 1993 (aged 24)		(Bolivia) Deportivo Ita
17	MF	Mariana Caucota	22 April 1994 (aged 23)		(Bolivia) San Martín de Porres
21	MF	Marcela Ortiz	23 September 1996 (aged 21)		(Bolivia) Santa Cruz
2	FW	Alexi Áñez	2 October 1990 (aged 27)		(Bolivia) Deportivo Ita
8	FW	Janeth Morón (captain)	2 June 1988 (aged 29)		(Bolivia) Deportivo Ita
9	FW	Ana Huanca	20 October 1986 (aged 31)		(Bolivia) San Martín de Porres
10	FW	Maitté Zamorano	6 January 1981 (aged 37)		(Bolivia) Deportivo Ita
18	FW	María Yesica Ramos	11 August 1995 (aged 22)		(Bolivia) Mundo Futuro
19	FW	Eduarda Cuiza	5 January 1980 (aged 38)		(Bolivia) Sinchi Wayra
20	FW	Ana María Rivera	23 October 1993 (aged 24)		(Bolivia) San Martín de Porres

=== Brazil ===
The squad was announced on 28 March 2018. Bruna Benites, Fabiana and Ludmila were unavailable due to injury.

Head coach: Vadão

No.	Pos.	Player	Date of birth (age)	Caps	Club
1	GK	Bárbara	4 July 1988 (aged 29)		(Brazil) Kindermann
12	GK	Aline	15 April 1989 (aged 28)		(Brazil) Ferroviária
20	GK	Letícia Izidoro	13 August 1994 (aged 23)		(Brazil) Corinthians
13	DF	Rilany	26 June 1986 (aged 31)		(Iceland) Grindavík
14	DF	Poliana	6 February 1991 (aged 27)		(United States) Orlando Pride
6	DF	Tamires	10 October 1987 (aged 30)		(Denmark) Fortuna Hjørring
21	DF	Mônica	21 April 1987 (aged 30)		(United States) Orlando Pride
4	DF	Rafaelle	18 June 1991 (aged 26)		(China) Changchun Zhuoyue
15	DF	Érika	4 February 1988 (aged 30)		(France) PSG
3	DF	Daiane	7 September 1997 (aged 20)		(Norway) Avaldsnes
17	MF	Andressinha	1 May 1995 (aged 22)		(United States) Portland Thorns
8	MF	Formiga	3 March 1978 (aged 40)		(France) PSG
7	MF	Andressa Alves	10 November 1992 (aged 25)		(Spain) Barcelona
5	MF	Thaisa	17 December 1988 (aged 29)		(United States) Sky Blue FC
19	MF	Aline Milene	8 April 1994 (aged 23)		(United States) Baylor University
2	FW	Millene Karine	13 December 1994 (aged 23)		(Brazil) Corinthians
22	FW	Raquel	21 March 1991 (aged 27)		(Brazil) Ferroviária
18	FW	Thaís	20 January 1993 (aged 25)		(South Korea) Incheon Hyundai Steel
16	FW	Bia Zaneratto	17 December 1993 (aged 24)		(South Korea) Incheon Hyundai Steel
10	FW	Marta (captain)	19 February 1986 (aged 32)		(United States) Orlando Pride
11	FW	Cristiane	15 May 1985 (aged 32)		(China) Changchun Zhuoyue
9	FW	Debinha	20 October 1991 (aged 26)		(United States) North Carolina Courage

=== Ecuador ===
Head coach: Wendy Villón

No.	Pos.	Player	Date of birth (age)	Caps	Club
1	GK	Shirley Berruz	6 January 1991 (aged 27)		(Ecuador) Rocafuerte
12	GK	Andrea Vera	10 April 1993 (aged 24)		(Ecuador) Universidad de Quito
22	GK	Irene Tobar	5 May 1989 (aged 28)		(Colombia) Real Cartagena
3	DF	Tamara Angulo	11 February 1998 (aged 20)		(Ecuador) Unión Española
4	DF	Justine Cuadra	17 August 1998 (aged 19)		(Ecuador) Club Ñañas
7	MF	Ingrid Rodríguez	24 November 1991 (aged 26)		(Ecuador) Unión Española
16	DF	Ligia Moreira (captain)	19 March 1992 (aged 26)		(Colombia) Patriotas Boyacá
2	MF	Suany Fajardo	24 February 1994 (aged 24)		(Ecuador) Unión Española
6	MF	Angie Ponce	14 July 1996 (aged 21)		(Ecuador) Espuce
10	MF	Valeria Palacios	16 February 1991 (aged 27)		(Ecuador) 7 de Febrero
14	MF	Sonia Ferrín	19 December 1990 (aged 27)		(Ecuador) ESPE
17	MF	Narcisa Mayorga	19 June 1997 (aged 20)		(Ecuador) Rocafuerte
19	MF	Kerlly Real	13 November 1998 (aged 19)		(Ecuador) Espuce
20	MF	Andrea Pesantes	14 January 1988 (aged 30)		(Ecuador) Unión Española
21	MF	Nicole Charcopa	1 April 2000 (aged 18)		(Ecuador) Unión Española
5	FW	Mayra Olvera	22 August 1992 (aged 25)		(Colombia) Patriotas Boyacá
8	FW	Erika Vásquez	4 August 1992 (aged 25)		(Ecuador) Unión Española
9	FW	Giannina Lattanzio	19 May 1993 (aged 24)		(Ecuador) Unión Española
11	FW	Madelin Riera	7 August 1989 (aged 28)		(Ecuador) Unión Española
13	FW	Carina Caicedo	23 July 1987 (aged 30)		(Ecuador) Unión Española
15	FW	Ámbar Torres	21 December 1994 (aged 23)		(Ecuador) Espuce
18	FW	Ericka Gracia	30 July 1989 (aged 28)		(Ecuador) Unión Española

=== Venezuela ===
The squad was announced on 19 March 2018.

Head coach: José Catoya

No.	Pos.	Player	Date of birth (age)	Caps	Club
1	GK	Andrea Tovar	22 August 1990 (aged 27)		(Colombia) Alianza Petrolera
12	GK	Maleike Pacheco	20 October 1993 (aged 24)		(Colombia) Cortuluá
13	GK	Lisbeth Castro (captain)	28 April 1988 (aged 29)		(Brazil) Corinthians/Audax
2	DF	Jaylis Oliveros	13 November 1993 (aged 24)		(Colombia) Atlético Huila
3	DF	Nubiluz Rangel	13 August 1993 (aged 24)		(Colombia) Atlético Nacional
4	DF	Petra Cabrera	19 May 1990 (aged 27)		(Colombia) La Equidad
14	DF	Alexyar Cañas	5 December 1996 (aged 21)		(Spain) Santa Teresa
21	DF	Nairelis Gutiérrez	2 July 1995 (aged 22)		(Colombia) Unión Magdalena
22	DF	Lisol Castillo	8 January 1995 (aged 23)		(Colombia) Unión Magdalena
5	MF	Marialba Zambrano	17 June 1995 (aged 22)		(Colombia) Cortuluá
6	MF	Yenifer Giménez	3 May 1996 (aged 21)		(France) Aurillac Arpajon
7	MF	Paola Villamizar	30 June 1994 (aged 23)		(Brazil) Corinthians/Audax
8	MF	Cinthia Zarabia	24 November 1992 (aged 25)		(Colombia) Junior
15	MF	Lisbeth Bandrés	24 March 1988 (aged 30)		(Colombia) Alianza Petrolera
16	MF	Idalys Pérez	20 July 1996 (aged 21)		(Colombia) Cortuluá
17	MF	Maikerlin Astudillo	10 May 1992 (aged 25)		(Venezuela) Estudiantes de Guárico
20	MF	Neily Carrasquel	26 July 1997 (aged 20)		(Colombia) Junior
9	FW	Deyna Castellanos	18 April 1999 (aged 18)		(United States) FSU Seminoles
10	FW	Gabriela García	2 April 1997 (aged 21)		(Spain) Deportivo La Coruña
11	FW	Oriana Altuve	3 October 1992 (aged 25)		(Colombia) Santa Fe
18	FW	Ysaura Viso	17 June 1993 (aged 24)		(Colombia) Unión Magdalena
19	FW	Joemar Guarecuco	20 June 1994 (aged 23)		(Colombia) Cortuluá
