= 2017 Copa Libertadores Femenina =

Copa CONMEBOL Libertadores Femenina Paraguay 2017

Tournament details
- Host country: Paraguay
- Dates: 7–21 October 2017
- Teams: 12 (from 10 associations)
- Venues: 4 (in 3 host cities)

Final positions
- Champions: (Brazil) Corinthians/Audax (1st title)
- Runners-up: (Chile) Colo-Colo
- Third place: (Argentina) River Plate
- Fourth place: (Paraguay) Cerro Porteño

Tournament statistics
- Matches played: 22
- Goals scored: 80 (3.64 per match)
- Top scorer(s): (Venezuela) Oriana Altuve (Brazil) Amanda Brunner (Uruguay) Carolina Birizamberri (Colombia) Catalina Usme (Paraguay) Gloria Villamayor (Bolivia) Maitté Zamorano (4 goals each)

The 2017 Copa CONMEBOL Libertadores Femenina was the ninth edition of the CONMEBOL Libertadores Femenina (also referred to as the Copa Libertadores Femenina), South America's premier women's club football tournament organized by CONMEBOL. The tournament was hosted in Paraguay from 7 to 21 October 2017.

Sportivo Limpeño, the defending champions, were eliminated in the group stage.

== Teams ==
The competition was contested by 12 teams: the champions of all ten CONMEBOL associations were given one entry, additionally the title holders re-enter and the host association qualifies one more team. The qualifying competitions of each association usually end late in the year (September to December).

Association	Team	Qualifying method	Participation	Previous best result
Argentina	River Plate	2016–17 Campeonato Argentino champions	1st	—
Bolivia	Deportivo ITA	2017 Campeonato Boliviano champions	1st	—
Brazil	Corinthians/Audax	2016 Copa do Brasil de Futebol Feminino champions	1st	—
Chile	Colo-Colo	2016 Apertura and Clausura champions play-off winners	7th	Champions (2012)
Colombia	Santa Fe	2017 Liga Femenina Profesional champions	1st	—
Ecuador	Unión Española	2016–17 Campeonato Ecuatoriano champions	2nd	Group stage (2016)
Paraguay (hosts)	Sportivo Limpeño	Title holders, also 2016 Campeonato Paraguayo champions	2nd	Champions (2016)
Paraguay (hosts)	Cerro Porteño	2016 Campeonato Paraguayo runners-up	4th	Third place (2014)
Paraguay (hosts)	Deportivo Capiatá	2017 Cuadrangular Pre-Libertadores winners	1st	—
Peru	Universitario	2016 Campeonato Nacional champions	3rd	Group stage (2015, 2016)
Uruguay	Colón	2016 Copa de Oro winners	4th	Fourth place (2016)
Venezuela	Estudiantes de Guárico	2016 Clausura and 2017 Apertura champions play-off winners	4th	Runners-up (2016)

Each team submitted a squad of at most 20 players.

== Venues ==
Matches were played in Gran Asunción. The stadiums were:

- Estadio Arsenio Erico, Asunción (capacity: 7,000)
- Estadio La Arboleda, Asunción (capacity: 7,500)
- Estadio General Adrián Jara, Luque (capacity: 3,500)
- Estadio Luis Alfonso Giagni, Villa Elisa (capacity: 5,000)

Venues of matches originally scheduled for 8, 10 and 18 October were changed.

== Draw ==
The draw was held on 18 September 2017, 12:00 PYT (UTC−4), at the headquarters of the Paraguayan Football Association. The 12 teams were drawn into three groups of four. The three host teams were seeded into Pot 1, while the remaining teams were seeded based on the results of their association in the 2016 Copa Libertadores Femenina.

Pot 1	Pot 2	Pot 3	Pot 4
(Paraguay) Sportivo Limpeño; (Paraguay) Cerro Porteño; (Paraguay) Deportivo Capiatá	(Venezuela) Estudiantes de Guárico; (Brazil) Corinthians/Audax; (Uruguay) Colón	(Chile) Colo-Colo; (Colombia) Santa Fe; (Argentina) River Plate	Bolivia 1 (Note: The draw was held before the identity of the team from Bolivia (Deportivo ITA) was known.); (Ecuador) Unión Española; (Peru) Universitario

== Group stage ==
The group winners and top runners-up advanced to the semi-finals.

On 9 October 2017, none of the scheduled Group C matches were played as players from several teams showed symptoms for food poisoning. CONMEBOL later announced the competition would be paused for three full days, to be resumed on 12 October 2017 with a modified schedule with four matches played on that day. The group stage was also extended from 15 to 17 October, while the semi-finals were rescheduled from 18 to 19 October. The Group B match between Colón and Universitario were further postponed from 13 to 15 October because some players had not yet recovered from food poisoning.

All times are local, PYST (UTC−3).

=== Group A ===
Pos	Team	Pld	W	D	L	GF	GA	GD	Pts	Qualification
1	(Argentina) River Plate	3	2	1	0	4	2	+2	7	Semi-finals
2	(Ecuador) Unión Española	3	1	2	0	5	3	+2	5	
3	(Venezuela) Estudiantes de Guárico	3	1	1	1	3	2	+1	4	
4	(Paraguay) Deportivo Capiatá (H)	3	0	0	3	2	7	−5	0	

Source: CONMEBOL
(H) Hosts
7 October 2017
18:00

River Plate (Argentina)	1–1	(Ecuador) Unión Española
Romero 39'	Report	Vásquez 46'

Estadio Arsenio Erico, Asunción
Referee: Olga Miranda (Paraguay)
7 October 2017
20:30

Deportivo Capiatá (Paraguay)	0–2	(Venezuela) Estudiantes de Guárico
	Report	Cabeza 52'; Villamizar 71'

Estadio Arsenio Erico, Asunción
Referee: María Carvajal (Chile)

12 October 2017
08:15

Estudiantes de Guárico (Venezuela)	1–1	(Ecuador) Unión Española
Basanta 17'	Report	Lattanzio 67'

Estadio Luis Alfonso Giagni, Villa Elisa
Referee: Silvia Ríos (Uruguay)
12 October 2017
10:30

Deportivo Capiatá (Paraguay)	1–2	(Argentina) River Plate
Genes 3'	Report	Birizamberri 22', 57'

Estadio Luis Alfonso Giagni, Villa Elisa
Referee: Elizabeth Tintaya (Peru)

15 October 2017
18:00

Estudiantes de Guárico (Venezuela)	0–1	(Argentina) River Plate
	Report	Pereyra 86'

Estadio General Adrián Jara, Luque
Referee: Edina Alves Batista (Brazil)
15 October 2017
20:15

Unión Española (Ecuador)	3–1	(Paraguay) Deportivo Capiatá
Riera 51', 56', 71'	Report	Pri Back 68' (pen.)

Estadio General Adrián Jara, Luque
Referee: Yeimy Martínez (Colombia)

=== Group B ===
Pos	Team	Pld	W	D	L	GF	GA	GD	Pts	Qualification
1	(Chile) Colo-Colo	3	2	1	0	12	5	+7	7	Semi-finals
2	(Paraguay) Cerro Porteño (H)	3	2	1	0	7	3	+4	7	Semi-finals
3	(Peru) Universitario	3	1	0	2	2	8	−6	3	
4	(Uruguay) Colón	3	0	0	3	3	8	−5	0	

Source: CONMEBOL
(H) Hosts
8 October 2017
18:00

Colo-Colo (Chile)	5–1	(Peru) Universitario
Leyton 5'; Muñoz 41'; Quezada 60'; Araya 75'; Villamayor 84'	Report	Núñez 31'

Estadio Luis Alfonso Giagni, Villa Elisa
Referee: Yeimy Martínez (Colombia)
8 October 2017
20:15

Cerro Porteño (Paraguay)	2–1	(Uruguay) Colón
Fleitas 56' (pen.); Peralta 80'	Report	Berni 88'

Estadio Luis Alfonso Giagni, Villa Elisa
Referee: Edina Alves Batista (Brazil)

13 October 2017
20:15

Cerro Porteño (Paraguay)	2–2	(Chile) Colo-Colo
Fleitas 13'; Peralta 41'	Report	Leyton 54'; Araya 78'

Estadio General Adrián Jara, Luque
Referee: Laura Fortunato (Argentina)
15 October 2017
09:00

Colón (Uruguay)	0–1	(Peru) Universitario
	Report	Núñez 89'

Estadio Arsenio Erico, Asunción
Referee: Sirley Cornejo (Bolivia)

16 October 2017
20:15

Colón (Uruguay)	2–5	(Chile) Colo-Colo
Berni 58'; Abraham 90+2'	Report	Villamayor 27' (pen.), 75', 89'; Muñoz 28'; Sáez 81'

Estadio Arsenio Erico, Asunción
Referee: Susana Corella (Ecuador)
17 October 2017
10:30

Universitario (Peru)	0–3	(Paraguay) Cerro Porteño
	Report	M. Mendoza 20'; Peralta 51'; Fernández 80'

Estadio Arsenio Erico, Asunción
Referee: Eryelitz Escalona (Venezuela)

=== Group C ===
Pos	Team	Pld	W	D	L	GF	GA	GD	Pts	Qualification
1	(Brazil) Corinthians/Audax	3	3	0	0	10	2	+8	9	Semi-finals
2	(Colombia) Santa Fe	3	1	1	1	12	6	+6	4	
3	(Paraguay) Sportivo Limpeño (H)	3	1	1	1	8	5	+3	4	
4	(Bolivia) Deportivo ITA	3	0	0	3	4	21	−17	0	

Source: CONMEBOL
(H) Hosts
12 October 2017
18:00

Santa Fe (Colombia)	9–2	(Bolivia) Deportivo ITA
Usme 1', 16', 58', 75'; Altuve 23', 29'; L. Santos 69'; Pineda 89'; Herrera 90+2'	Report	Zamorano 9', 39'

Estadio La Arboleda, Asunción
Referee: Eryelitz Escalona (Venezuela)
12 October 2017
20:15

Sportivo Limpeño (Paraguay)	0–2	(Brazil) Corinthians/Audax
	Report	Mimi 25'; Monique Peçanha 48'

Estadio La Arboleda, Asunción
Referee: Susana Corella (Ecuador)

14 October 2017
18:00

Corinthians/Audax (Brazil)	6–1	(Bolivia) Deportivo ITA
Rosana 1'; Amanda Brunner 8', 43'; Raquel 29', 62'; Byanca Brasil 53'	Report	Zamorano 41'

Estadio La Arboleda, Asunción
Referee: Zulma Quiñónez (Paraguay)
14 October 2017
20:15

Sportivo Limpeño (Paraguay)	2–2	(Colombia) Santa Fe
Cordner 34', 42'	Report	L. Santos 28'; Altuve 50'

Estadio La Arboleda, Asunción
Referee: María Carvajal (Chile)

17 October 2017
18:00

Corinthians/Audax (Brazil)	2–1	(Colombia) Santa Fe
Grazi 46', 48'	Report	Altuve 57' (pen.)

Estadio La Arboleda, Asunción
Referee: Sirley Cornejo (Bolivia)
17 October 2017
20:15

Deportivo ITA (Bolivia)	1–6	(Paraguay) Sportivo Limpeño
Zamorano 71'	Report	Peña 38'; Sandoval 55'; Garay López 66'; B. Benítez 79'; Larrea 85', 89'

Estadio La Arboleda, Asunción
Referee: Elizabeth Tintaya (Peru)

=== Ranking of group runners-up ===
Pos	Grp	Team	Pld	W	D	L	GF	GA	GD	Pts	Qualification
1	B	(Paraguay) Cerro Porteño (H)	3	2	1	0	7	3	+4	7	Semi-finals
2	A	(Ecuador) Unión Española	3	1	2	0	5	3	+2	5	
3	C	(Colombia) Santa Fe	3	1	1	1	12	6	+6	4	

Source: CONMEBOL
(H) Hosts

== Knockout stage ==
The semi-final matchups were:

- Group A winner vs. Group B winner
- Group C winner vs. Best runner-up

The semi-final winners and losers played in the final and third place match respectively.

=== Bracket ===
Semi-finals
19 October - Luis Alfonso Giagni
(Argentina) River Plate	0
(Chile) Colo-Colo	2
19 October - Luis Alfonso Giagni
(Brazil) Corinthians/Audax	3
(Paraguay) Cerro Porteño	0

Final
21 October - Arsenio Erico
(Chile) Colo-Colo	0 (4)
(Brazil) Corinthians/Audax (p)	0 (5)
Third place
21 October - Arsenio Erico
(Argentina) River Plate	2
(Paraguay) Cerro Porteño	1

=== Semi-finals ===
19 October 2017
18:00

River Plate (Argentina)	0–2	(Chile) Colo-Colo
	Report	Huenteo 48'; Leyton 89'

Estadio Luis Alfonso Giagni, Villa Elisa
Referee: Sirley Cornejo (Bolivia)

19 October 2017
20:15

Corinthians/Audax (Brazil)	3–0	(Paraguay) Cerro Porteño
Amanda Brunner 45', 89'; Byanca Brasil 60'	Report

Estadio Luis Alfonso Giagni, Villa Elisa
Referee: Susana Corella (Ecuador)

=== Third place match ===
21 October 2017
18:00

River Plate (Argentina)	2–1	(Paraguay) Cerro Porteño
Birizamberri 34', 90+2'	Report	Fernández 46'

Estadio Arsenio Erico, Asunción
Referee: Silvia Ríos (Uruguay)

=== Final ===
21 October 2017
20:15

Colo-Colo (Chile)	0–0	(Brazil) Corinthians/Audax
	Report
Penalties
Villamayor (penalty scored); Araya (penalty scored); Quezada (penalty scored); C. Soto (penalty missed); Guerrero (penalty scored); Sáez (penalty missed); R. Soto (penalty missed)	4–5	(penalty missed) Cacau; (penalty scored) Daiane; (penalty scored) Kerolin; (penalty scored) Pardal; (penalty scored) Byanca Brasil; (penalty missed) Yasmim; (penalty scored) Ana Vitória

Estadio Arsenio Erico, Asunción
Referee: Eryelitz Escalona (Venezuela)

Colo-Colo	Corinthians/Audax

GK	12	(Chile) Carolina Armijo
DF	2	(Chile) Rocío Soto
DF	18	(Chile) Camila Sáez
DF	3	(Chile) Carla Guerrero
DF	17	(Chile) Geraldine Leyton
MF	14	(Chile) Ana Gutiérrez	(substituted off) 73'
MF	6	(Chile) Claudia Soto (c)
MF	8	(Chile) Karen Araya
FW	10	(Paraguay) Gloria Villamayor
FW	19	(Chile) Yessenia Huenteo
FW	7	(Chile) Bárbara Muñoz
Substitutes:
GK	1	(Chile) Romina Parraguirre
DF	15	(Chile) Catalina Alarcón
DF	16	(Chile) Fernanda Hidalgo
MF	4	(Venezuela) Anabel Guzmán
MF	5	(Chile) Yastin Jiménez
FW	9	(Chile) Nathalie Quezada	(substituted on) 73'
FW	11	(Chile) Jeannette Aguirre
FW	13	(Chile) Fernanda Contreras
FW	20	(Chile) Yanara Lepín
Manager:
(Chile) Carlos Véliz

GK	12	(Brazil) Lelê
DF	19	(Brazil) Paulinha
DF	3	(Brazil) Pardal
DF	4	(Brazil) Mimi
DF	6	(Brazil) Yasmim
MF	5	(Brazil) Monique Peçanha	(yellow card) 85'	(substituted off) 90+2'
MF	17	(Brazil) Patrícia Llanos		(substituted off) 74'
MF	20	(Brazil) Daiane
MF	18	(Brazil) Kerolin
FW	7	(Brazil) Grazi (c)		(substituted off) 83'
FW	11	(Brazil) Raquel	(red card) 84'
Substitutes:
GK	1	(Brazil) Tainá
DF	2	(Brazil) Leidi
DF	15	(Argentina) Agustina Barroso
DF	16	(Brazil) Antônia
MF	8	(Brazil) Ana Vitória		(substituted on) 74'
MF	10	(Brazil) Rosana
MF	14	(Brazil) Amanda Brunner
FW	9	(Brazil) Byanca Brasil		(substituted on) 90+2'
FW	13	(Brazil) Cacau		(substituted on) 83'
Manager:
(Brazil) Arthur Elias

== Top goalscorers ==
Rank	Player	Team	Goals
1	(Venezuela) Oriana Altuve	(Colombia) Santa Fe	4
1	(Brazil) Amanda Brunner	(Brazil) Corinthians/Audax	4
1	(Uruguay) Carolina Birizamberri	(Argentina) River Plate	4
1	(Colombia) Catalina Usme	(Colombia) Santa Fe	4
1	(Paraguay) Gloria Villamayor	(Chile) Colo-Colo	4
1	(Bolivia) Maitté Zamorano	(Bolivia) Deportivo ITA	4
7	(Chile) Geraldine Leyton	(Chile) Colo-Colo	3
7	(Paraguay) Amada Peralta	(Paraguay) Cerro Porteño	3
7	(Ecuador) Madelin Riera	(Ecuador) Unión Española	3
10	(Chile) Karen Araya	(Chile) Colo-Colo	2
10	(Uruguay) Catherin Berni	(Uruguay) Colón	2
10	(Brazil) Byanca Brasil	(Brazil) Corinthians/Audax	2
10	(Trinidad and Tobago) Kennya Cordner	(Paraguay) Sportivo Limpeño	2
10	(Paraguay) Rebeca Fernández	(Paraguay) Cerro Porteño	2
10	(Paraguay) Ana Fleitas	(Paraguay) Cerro Porteño	2
10	(Brazil) Grazi	(Brazil) Corinthians/Audax	2
10	(Paraguay) Liza Larrea	(Paraguay) Sportivo Limpeño	2
10	(Chile) Bárbara Muñoz	(Chile) Colo-Colo	2
10	(Peru) Pierina Núñez	(Peru) Universitario	2
10	(Brazil) Raquel	(Brazil) Corinthians/Audax	2
10	(Colombia) Leicy Santos	(Colombia) Santa Fe	2

Source:CONMEBOL
