= 2020 South American Under-20 Women's Football Championship squads =

The following is a list of squads for all 10 national teams that competed at the 2020 South American Under-20 Women's Football Championship. Each national team had to submit a final squad of 22 players, 3 of whom had to be goalkeepers.

== Group A ==
=== Argentina ===
Head coach: Carlos Borrello

The 22-player squad was announced on 23 February 2020.

No.	Pos.	Player	Date of birth (age)	Caps	Goals	Club
1	GK	Ariana Álvarez	20 March 2000 (aged 19)			(Argentine Football Association) San Lorenzo
12	GK	Julieta Blanco	3 May 2000 (aged 19)			(Argentine Football Association) Gimnasia y Esgrima (LP)
22	GK	Melina Melipil	29 March 2001 (aged 18)			(Argentine Football Association) River Plate
2	DF	Aldana Narváez	22 May 2001 (aged 18)			(Argentine Football Association) Social Lux
3	DF	Milagros Otazú	31 May 2001 (aged 18)			(Argentine Football Association) Racing
6	DF	Giuliana González	18 June 2002 (aged 17)			(Argentine Football Association) River Plate
11	DF	Stephanie Melgarejo	6 June 2001 (aged 18)			(Argentine Football Association) River Plate
4	MF	Maricel González	17 May 2001 (aged 18)			(Argentine Football Association) UAI Urquiza
5	MF	Milagros Díaz	12 January 2000 (aged 20)			(Argentine Football Association) Gimnasia y Esgrima (LP)
8	MF	Francesca Docters	22 July 2000 (aged 19)			(United States Soccer Federation) Northwestern Wildcats
10	MF	Dalila Ippólito	24 March 2002 (aged 17)			(Argentine Football Association) UAI Urquiza
13	MF	Melanie Torales	4 May 2001 (aged 18)			(Argentine Football Association) Lanús
14	MF	Loana Bernhard	4 May 2003 (aged 16)			(Argentine Football Association) Belgrano de Paraná
15	MF	Daiana Falfán	14 October 2000 (aged 19)			(Argentine Football Association) UAI Urquiza
17	MF	Sophia Braun	26 June 2000 (aged 19)			(United States Soccer Federation) Gonzaga Bulldogs
18	MF	Justina Morcillo	9 August 2000 (aged 19)			(Argentine Football Association) River Plate
21	MF	Rocío Vázquez	31 October 2001 (aged 18)			(Argentine Football Association) San Lorenzo
7	FW	Nicole Hain	4 August 2000 (aged 19)			(Argentine Football Association) River Plate
9	FW	Brisa de Ángelis	30 September 2002 (aged 17)			(Argentine Football Association) Renato Cesarini
16	FW	Paloma Fagiano	30 October 2001 (aged 18)			(Argentine Football Association) Racing (reserve team)
19	FW	Catalina Primo	19 May 2000 (aged 19)			(Argentine Football Association) UAI Urquiza
20	FW	Victoria Costa	14 November 2000 (aged 19)			(Royal Spanish Football Federation) Fundación Rayo Vallecano

=== Bolivia ===
No.	Pos.	Player	Date of birth (age)	Caps	Goals	Club
	GK	Kimberly López				
	GK	Manuela Paz				
	GK	Erika Sánchez				
	DF	Karen Arévalo				
	DF	Leonela Cruz				
	DF	Ariani Melgar				
	DF	Aidé Mendiola	14 November 2000 (aged 19)			
	DF	Sandra Ortega				
	DF	Verónica Segarra				
	DF	Eufronia Tórrez				
	MF	Yoselín Basualdo	15 March 2000 (aged 19)			
	MF	Micaela Calderón				
	MF	Yoisi Prado				
	MF	Nashmi Segovia				
	MF	Eyda Serrudo				
	MF	Graciela Soto				
	FW	Alicia Bejarano				
	FW	Emilie Doerksen				
	FW	Marlene Flores				
	FW	Sonia Peña				
	FW	Maya Siles				
	FW	Cielo Veizaga				

=== Colombia ===
Head Coach:Nelson Abadía

The 22-player squad was announced on 18 February 2020.

=== Ecuador ===
Head coach: (Portugal) Emily Lima

== Group B ==
=== Brazil ===
Head coach:Jonas Urias

The 22-player squad was announced on 18 February 2020.

No.	Pos.	Player	Date of birth (age)	Caps	Goals	Club
1	GK	Nicole	13 April 2000 (aged 19)			(Brazilian Football Confederation) Santos
12	GK	Mayara	3 August 2001 (aged 18)			(Brazilian Football Confederation) Internacional
22	GK	Marcelle	27 December 2002 (aged 17)			(Brazilian Football Confederation) São Paulo
2	DF	Bruninha	16 June 2002 (aged 17)			(Brazilian Football Confederation) Internacional
4	DF	Camila	5 December 2000 (aged 19)			(Brazilian Football Confederation) Avaí / Kindermann
3	DF	Isa Haas	20 January 2001 (aged 19)			(Brazilian Football Confederation) Internacional
6	DF	Gisseli	27 July 2001 (aged 18)			(Brazilian Football Confederation) Grêmio
13	DF	Flávia Mota	1 February 2001 (aged 19)			(Brazilian Football Confederation) Iranduba
14	DF	Lauren	13 September 2002 (aged 17)			(Brazilian Football Confederation) São Paulo
5	MF	Angelina	26 January 2000 (aged 20)			(Brazilian Football Confederation) Palmeiras
8	MF	Vitória Yaya	23 January 2002 (aged 18)			(Brazilian Football Confederation) São Paulo
10	MF	Duda Sampaio	18 May 2001 (aged 18)			(Brazilian Football Confederation) Cruzeiro
15	MF	Raquel	20 February 2000 (aged 20)			(Portuguese Football Federation) Valadares Gaia
16	MF	Cris	14 January 2002 (aged 18)			(Brazilian Football Confederation) São Paulo
17	MF	Ana Vitória	6 March 2001 (aged 18)			(Portuguese Football Federation) Benfica
21	MF	Mariza	8 November 2001 (aged 18)			(Brazilian Football Confederation) Grêmio
7	FW	Micaelly	26 September 2000 (aged 19)			(Brazilian Football Confederation) Cruzeiro
9	FW	Nycole	26 March 2000 (aged 19)			(Portuguese Football Federation) Benfica
11	FW	Jaqueline	31 March 2000 (aged 19)			(Brazilian Football Confederation) São Paulo
18	FW	Jheniffer	6 November 2001 (aged 18)			(Brazilian Football Confederation) Internacional
19	FW	Mylena	29 December 2000 (aged 19)			(Brazilian Football Confederation) Avaí / Kindermann
20	FW	Marta	27 April 2000 (aged 19)			(Brazilian Football Confederation) Grêmio

=== Chile ===
Head coach: Andrés Aguayo

The 22-player squad was announced on 22 February 2020.

No.	Pos.	Player	Date of birth (age)	Caps	Goals	Club
1	GK	Antonia Canales	16 October 2002 (aged 17)			(Football Federation of Chile) Universidad Católica
12	GK	Romina Parraguez	26 April 2000 (aged 19)			(United States Soccer Federation) Dixie State University
22	GK	Tina Lingsch	23 December 2001 (aged 18)			(Football Federation of Chile) Universidad de Chile
2	DF	Michelle Olivares	4 April 2002 (aged 17)			(Football Federation of Chile) Universidad de Chile
3	DF	Emilia Pastrián	8 August 2001 (aged 18)			(Football Federation of Chile) Palestino
4	DF	Josefina Keymer	13 June 2000 (aged 19)			(Football Federation of Chile) Universidad Católica
5	DF	Karen Fuentes	3 August 2004 (aged 15)			(Football Federation of Chile) Universidad de Chile
14	DF	Martina Osses	6 April 2003 (aged 16)			(Football Federation of Chile) Colo-Colo
15	DF	Daniela Aguirre	17 May 2000 (aged 19)			(Football Federation of Chile) Audax Italiano
18	DF	Gali Espinoza	27 November 2003 (aged 16)			(Football Federation of Chile) Universidad Católica
6	MF	Elisa Durán	16 January 2002 (aged 18)			(Football Federation of Chile) Colo-Colo
8	MF	Yastin Jiménez	17 October 2002 (aged 17)			(Football Federation of Chile) Colo-Colo
16	MF	Florencia Rath	21 February 2002 (aged 18)			(Football Federation of Chile) Universidad de Chile
17	MF	Valentina Navarrete	13 July 2003 (aged 16)			(Football Federation of Chile) Universidad de Concepción
19	MF	Catalina Abusada	13 August 2001 (aged 18)			(United States Soccer Federation) Stevens Institute of Technology
7	FW	Isidora Olave	23 April 2002 (aged 17)			(Football Federation of Chile) Colo-Colo
9	FW	Camila Pavez	8 February 2000 (aged 20)			(Argentine Football Association) River Plate
10	FW	Javiera Grez	11 July 2000 (aged 19)			(Football Federation of Chile) Colo-Colo
11	FW	Antonia Alarcón	2 June 2001 (aged 18)			(Football Federation of Chile) Colo-Colo
13	FW	Isabelle Kadzban	20 December 2001 (aged 18)			(United States Soccer Federation) Florida Gators
20	FW	Macarena Adasme	2 September 2000 (aged 19)			(Football Federation of Chile) Universidad de Chile
21	FW	Elisa Pérez	7 September 2001 (aged 18)			(Football Federation of Chile) Universidad de Chile

=== Paraguay ===
Head coach: Epifania Benítez

The 22-player squad was announced on 21 February 2020.

No.	Pos.	Player	Date of birth (age)	Caps	Goals	Club
1	GK	Isabel Ortiz				(Paraguayan Football Association) Sol de América
12	GK	Jessica Franco				(Paraguayan Football Association) Deportivo Capiatá
22	GK	Arianne González				(Paraguayan Football Association) Cerro Porteño
2	DF	Natalia Villasanti				(Paraguayan Football Association) Sol de América
3	DF	Deisy Ojeda				(Paraguayan Football Association) Olimpia
4	DF	Daysy Bareiro				(Paraguayan Football Association) Sol de América
5	DF	Limpia Fretes				(Paraguayan Football Association) Cerro Porteño
13	DF	Fiorella Martínez				(Paraguayan Football Association) Libertad/Limpeño
14	DF	María Paz Bogado				(Paraguayan Football Association) Deportivo Capiatá
21	DF	Vanessa Arce				(Paraguayan Football Association) Cerro Porteño
6	MF	Cynthia Ayala				(Paraguayan Football Association) Cerro Porteño
7	MF	Graciela Martínez				(Paraguayan Football Association) Cerro Porteño
8	MF	Dahiana Bogarín				(Paraguayan Football Association) Cerro Porteño
10	MF	Erika Cartaman				(Paraguayan Football Association) Deportivo Capiatá
16	MF	María Melgarejo				(Paraguayan Football Association) Deportivo Capiatá
17	MF	Karen Benítez				(Paraguayan Football Association) Liga de Desarrollo
19	MF	Yéssica Álvarez				(Paraguayan Football Association) Deportivo Santaní
20	MF	Elena Rojas				(Paraguayan Football Association) Deportivo Capiatá
9	FW	Jessica Sánchez				(Paraguayan Football Association) Olimpia
11	FW	Yohana Benkenstein				(Paraguayan Football Association) Unión de Caronay – Itapúa
15	FW	Zunilda Coronel				(Paraguayan Football Association) Olimpia
18	FW	Liz Barreto				(Paraguayan Football Association) Deportivo Santaní

=== Peru ===
Head coach: (Brazil) Doriva Bueno

No.	Pos.	Player	Date of birth (age)	Caps	Goals	Club
1	GK	Silvana Alfaro				(Peruvian Football Federation) Sporting Cristal
12	GK	Mia Shalit				(United States Soccer Federation) Rebels ECNL
21	GK	María Fernanda Dávila				(Peruvian Football Federation) Sporting Cristal
2	DF	Gianella Romero				(Peruvian Football Federation) Universitario
4	DF	Diana Alfaro				(Peruvian Football Federation) Alianza Lima
5	DF	Andrea Flores				(Peruvian Football Federation) Sporting Cristal
6	DF	Angie Tomateo				(Peruvian Football Federation) JC Sport Gils
15	DF	Alondra Cruz				(Peruvian Football Federation) Universidad San Martín
18	DF	Noelia Lumbre				(Peruvian Football Federation) Sporting Cristal
3	MF	Belén Arguedas				(Peruvian Football Federation) Sporting Cristal
7	MF	Jhosely Gamarra				(Peruvian Football Federation) Sporting Cristal
8	MF	Teresa Wowk				(United States Soccer Federation) United Futbol Academy
10	MF	Allison Azabache				(Peruvian Football Federation) Sporting Cristal
11	MF	Milena Tomayconsa				(Peruvian Football Federation) Sporting Unión
14	MF	Braelynn Llamoca				(United States Soccer Federation) Fullerton Rangers
16	MF	Daniella Milovanov				(United States Soccer Federation) Wesleyan Cardinals
19	MF	Tabitha Galliani				(United States Soccer Federation) Metro United
20	MF	Fabiana Oribe				(Peruvian Football Federation) Atlético Trujillo
9	FW	Pierina Núñez				(Royal Spanish Football Federation) Logroño
13	FW	Kiara Calmet				(Peruvian Football Federation) Sporting Cristal
17	FW	Izabella Ruíz				(Royal Belgian Football Association) Standard Liège
22	FW	Claudia Daga				(Peruvian Football Federation) Sporting Cristal

=== Uruguay ===
Head coach: Ariel Longo

The 22-player squad was announced on 26 February 2020.

No.	Pos.	Player	Date of birth (age)	Caps	Goals	Club
1	GK	Josefina Villanueva				(Uruguayan Football Association) Progreso
12	GK	Brisa Da Silva				(Uruguayan Football Association) Colón
22	GK	Jennifer Sosa				(United States Soccer Federation)
3	DF	Sofía Ramonndegui				(Uruguayan Football Association) Palmirense de Colonia
4	DF	Shirley Mederos				(Uruguayan Football Association) Liverpool
6	DF	Alexia Da Silva				(Uruguayan Football Association) Peñarol
14	DF	Antonella Ferradans				(Uruguayan Football Association) Progreso
19	DF	Lorena Yaque				(Uruguayan Football Association) Rampla Juniors de Durazno
20	DF	Maytel Costa				(Uruguayan Football Association) Colón
2	MF	Daniela Olivera				(Uruguayan Football Association) Nacional
5	MF	Deyna Morales				(Uruguayan Football Association) Rentistas San Jacinto
7	MF	Juliana Viera				(Uruguayan Football Association) Liverpool
8	MF	Karol Bermúdez				(Uruguayan Football Association) Liverpool
10	MF	Valentina Morales				(Royal Spanish Football Federation) Murcia
16	MF	Sasha Larrea				(Uruguayan Football Association) Progreso
17	MF	Pilar González				(Uruguayan Football Association) Canelones Fénix
18	MF	Solange Lemos				(Uruguayan Football Association) Atenas de San Carlos
9	FW	Wendy Caraballo				(Uruguayan Football Association) Arachanas de Melo
11	FW	Esperanza Pizarro				(Uruguayan Football Association) Nacional
13	FW	Rocío Martínez				(Uruguayan Football Association) Atenas de San Carlos
15	FW	Martina Terra				(Uruguayan Football Association) Liverpool
21	FW	Belén Aquino				(Uruguayan Football Association) Progreso
