= 2012 Copa Libertadores Femenina =

Tournament details
- Host country: Brazil
- Dates: 15–25 November 2012
- Teams: 12 (from 10 associations)
- Venues: 3 (in 3 host cities)

Final positions
- Champions: (Chile) Colo Colo (1st title)
- Runners-up: (Brazil) Foz Cataratas
- Third place: (Brazil) São José
- Fourth place: (Brazil) Vitória das Tabocas

Tournament statistics
- Matches played: 22
- Goals scored: 94 (4.27 per match)
- Top scorer: (Brazil) Cristiane (7 goals)
- Best player: (Chile) Karen Araya

The 2012 Copa Libertadores Femenina was the fourth edition of the Copa Libertadores Femenina, CONMEBOL's premier annual international women's football club tournament. São José were the defending champions.

On 28 September 2012 it was confirmed that all matches were to be played in the state of Pernambuco, Brazil.

Colo Colo won the title after a penalty shootout in the final, and became the first non-Brazilian team to win the tournament. The top-scorer award was given to Cristiane for a second time and the best player award was won by Karen Araya from Colo Colo.

== Qualification and format ==
The format was the same as in 2011 with twelve teams divided into three groups of four teams. The group winners and best second-placed team advanced to the semi-finals.

Association	Team	Qualifying method
Argentina	Boca Juniors	2011–12 Clausura and Apertura play-off winner
Bolivia	Universidad Santa Cruz	2012 Bolivian League champion
Brazil	Foz Cataratas	2011 Copa do Brasil de Futebol Feminino champion
Brazil	São José	Title holder
Brazil	Vitória das Tabocas	host country team
Chile	Colo Colo	2011 Chilean League champion
Colombia	Formas Íntimas	Copa Libertadores Women Pre 2012 winner
Ecuador	Deportivo Quito	? (no national league)
Paraguay	Universidad Autonoma	2011 Paraguayan League champion
Peru	JC Sport Girls	2012 Campeonato Nacional de Fútbol Femenino champion
Uruguay	Nacional	2011 Campeonato Uruguayo Femenino champion
Venezuela	Caracas	2012 Venezuelan League champion

== Venues ==
Three cities host matches in this year's edition: Recife, Vitória de Santo Antão and Caruaru.

All cities lie in the East of Pernambuco

Stadium	City	Capacity
Estádio Eládio de Barros Carvalho	Recife	19,800
Estádio Luiz José de Lacerda	Caruaru	25,000
Estádio Municipal Severino Cândido Carneiro	Vitória de Santo Antão	8,000

== First stage ==
The group winner and the best runners-up advanced to the semifinals. The draw was held on 9 October 2012. A list of fixtures was announced on 10 October 2012.

Key to colors in group tables
Group winners and runners-up advanced to the semi-finals

Tie-breaker in case of equal points is:

1. Goal difference
2. Goals scored
3. Match between tied teams

If still tied the organisers may decide how to proceed. In case two team are tied after having played each other the last matchday, the tie is decided by a penalty shootout.

All times are Brasília time, UTC-03.

=== Group A ===
Group A is played in Recife.

Team	Pld	W	D	L	GF	GA	GD	Pts
(Brazil) Foz Cataratas	3	3	0	0	12	4	8	9
(Ecuador) Deportivo Quito	3	2	0	1	7	7	0	6
(Colombia) Formas Íntimas	3	1	0	2	8	6	+2	3
(Bolivia) Universidad Santa Cruz	3	0	0	3	4	14	–10	0

15 November 2012
16:00

Deportivo Quito (Ecuador)	2 – 1	(Colombia) Formas Íntimas
Real 26'; Quinteros 53'	Report	Andrade 76'

Recife
15 November 2012
18:00

Foz Cataratas (Brazil)	5 – 1	(Bolivia) Universidad Santa Cruz
Andressa 5', 78' (pen.); Thaysa 20'; Daiane Moretti 41'; Giovana 73'	Report	Morón 21'

Recife

18 November 2012
16:00

Deportivo Quito (Ecuador)	4 – 2	(Bolivia) Universidad Santa Cruz
Olvera 2'; Ámbar Gillians 10'; Quinteros 41'; Jeannine Alomía 55'	Report	Salvatierra 52'; Morón 78'

Recife
18 November 2012
18:00

Foz Cataratas (Brazil)	3 – 2	(Colombia) Formas Íntimas
Daiane Moretti 13', 39', 55'	Report	Jennifer Peñaloza 22' (pen.); Paula Botero 90' (pen.)

Recife

21 November 2012
19:00

Foz Cataratas (Brazil)	4 – 1	(Ecuador) Deportivo Quito
Daiane Moretti 18', 32'; Bruna Benites 24'; Andressa 41'	Report	Quinteros 48'

Recife
21 November 2012
21:00

Universidad Santa Cruz (Bolivia)	1 – 5	(Colombia) Formas Íntimas
Méndez 68'		Ospina 12'; Paula Botero 24'; Nayla Imbachi 45'; Cuesta 55', 76'

Recife

=== Group B ===
Group B is played in Caruaru.

Team	Pld	W	D	L	GF	GA	GD	Pts
(Brazil) São José	3	2	1	0	10	1	+9	7
(Argentina) Boca Juniors	3	2	1	0	7	4	+3	7
(Venezuela) Caracas	3	1	0	2	3	3	0	3
(Uruguay) Nacional	3	0	0	3	2	14	–12	0

16 November 2012
16:00

Boca Juniors (Argentina)	2 – 1	(Venezuela) Caracas
Ojeda 15'; Manicler 78'	Report	Bandrés 59'

Caruaru
16 November 2012
18:00

São José (Brazil)	8 – 0	(Uruguay) Nacional
Giovânia 3'; Cristiane 6', 32', 63', 76'; Formiga 20'; Priscilinha 58'; Alana 87'	Report

Caruaru

19 November 2012
19:00

Boca Juniors (Argentina)	4 – 2	(Uruguay) Nacional
Oviedo 22'; Gómez 47'; Jaimes 50'; Manicler 86'	Report	Florencia Garrido 45'; Castro 88'

Caruaru
19 November 2012
21:00

São José (Brazil)	1 – 0	(Venezuela) Caracas
Cristiane 59' (pen.)	Report

Caruaru

21 November 2012
19:00

São José (Brazil)	1 – 1	(Argentina) Boca Juniors
Cristiane 79'	Report	González 55'

Caruaru
21 November 2012
21:00

Nacional (Uruguay)	0 – 2	(Venezuela) Caracas
	Report	Torres 26', 51'

Caruaru

=== Group C ===
Group C is played in Vitória de Santo Antão.

Team	Pld	W	D	L	GF	GA	GD	Pts
(Brazil) Vitória das Tabocas	3	2	1	0	13	1	+12	7
(Chile) Colo Colo	3	2	1	0	14	3	+11	7
(Paraguay) Universidad Autonoma	3	1	0	2	3	7	–4	3
(Peru) JC Sport Girls	3	0	0	3	1	20	–19	0

17 November 2012
19:00

JC Sport Girls (Peru)	0 – 2	(Paraguay) Universidad Autonoma
	Report	Riveros 87'; Cuevas 90+1'

Vitória
17 November 2012
21:00

Vitória das Tabocas (Brazil)	1 – 1	(Chile) Colo Colo
Zizi 47'	Report	Banini 17'

Vitória

19 November 2012
19:00

JC Sport Girls (Peru)	1 – 10	(Chile) Colo Colo
Liliana Neyra 41'	Report	Guerrero 22'; Araya 45+2' (pen.), 89'; Lara 48'; Ascanio 56', 59'; Banini 58', 90+2'; Aedo 69'; Quezada 70'

Vitória
19 November 2012
21:00

Vitória das Tabocas (Brazil)	4 – 0	(Paraguay) Universidad Autonoma
Giovanna 22'; Thaisinha 28', 44'; Chú Santos 86'	Report

Vitória

21 November 2012
19:00

Vitória das Tabocas (Brazil)	8 – 0	(Peru) JC Sport Girls
Chú Santos 3', 14', 80'; Cida 10'; Baiana 31'; Patrícia 35'; Lili Bala 59'; Thaisinha 60'	Report

Vitória
21 November 2012
21:00

Colo Colo (Chile)	3 – 1	(Paraguay) Universidad Autonoma
Lara 32' (pen.); Villamayor 37'; Ascanio 39'	Report	Galeano 57'

Vitória

=== Ranking of second place-finishers ===
In the ranking of group runners-ups all matches do count towards the ranking.

Grp	Team	Pld	W	D	L	GF	GA	GD	Pts
C	(Chile) Colo Colo	3	2	1	0	14	3	+11	7
B	(Argentina) Boca Juniors	3	2	1	0	7	4	+3	7
A	(Ecuador) Deportivo Quito	3	2	0	1	7	7	0	6

== Final stages ==
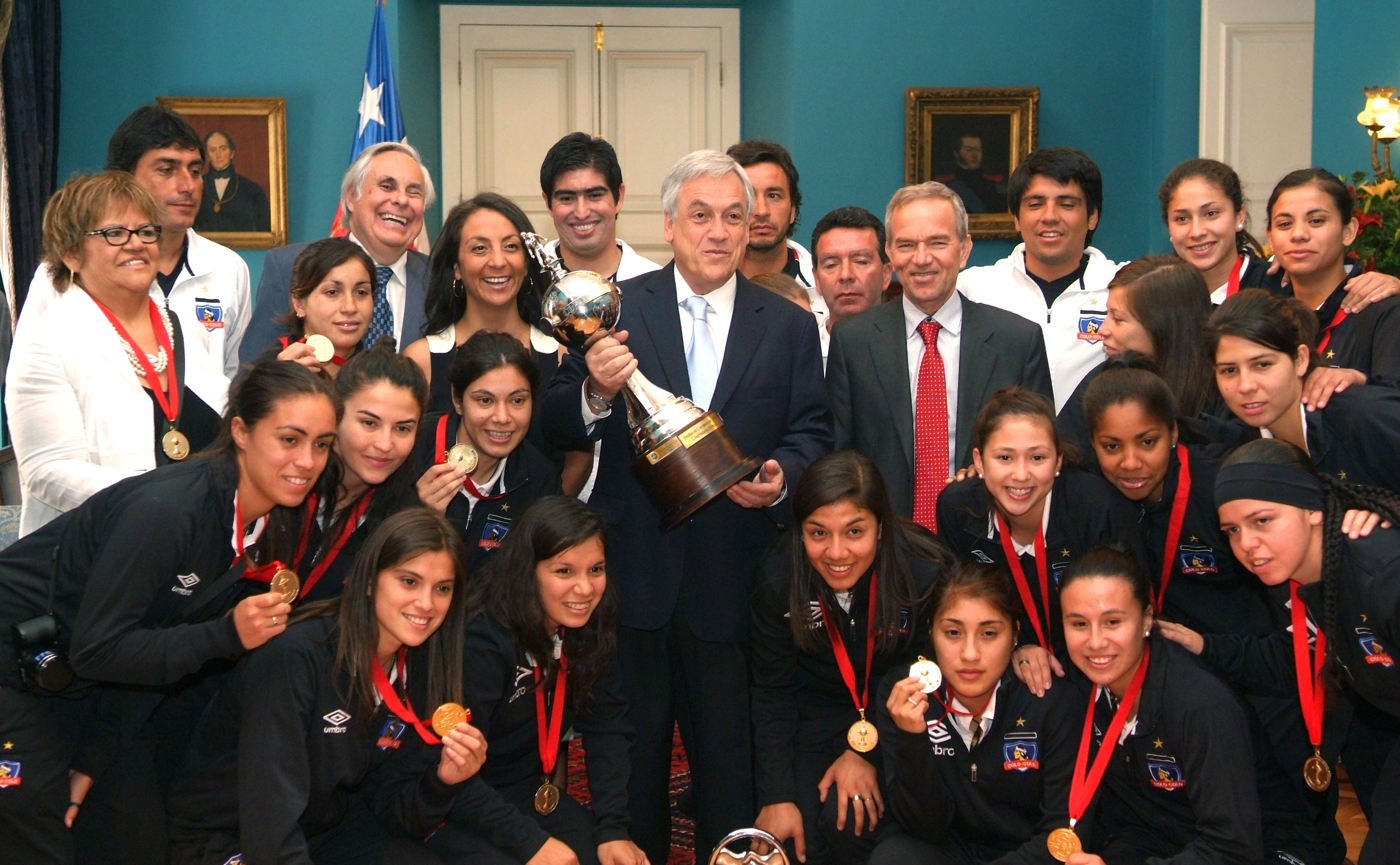
Chile's president Sebastián Piñera holding the Libertadores trophy with the winning team CSD Colo-Colo.

Per draw Group A and B winners met with the best second-place finisher meeting Group C winner in the semi-finals. Should however two Brazilian teams advance to the semi-finals, those two would play each other regardless.

Semi-finals
23 November 2012
(Brazil) Foz Cataratas	1 (4)
(Brazil) São José	1 (3)
23 November 2012
(Brazil) Vitória das Tabocas	3
(Chile) Colo Colo	4

Final
25 November 2012
(Brazil) Foz Cataratas	0 (2)
(Chile) Colo Colo	0 (4)
Third place
25 November 2012
(Brazil) São José	1
(Brazil) Vitória das Tabocas	0

=== Semifinals ===
23 November 2012
17:00

Foz Cataratas (Brazil)	1 – 1 (a.e.t.)	(Brazil) São José
Andressa 60'	Report	Giovânia 74'
Penalties
Nenê (penalty scored); Bia (penalty scored); Andressa (penalty missed); Rilany (penalty scored); Daiana Moretti (penalty scored)	4–3	(penalty missed) Fran; (penalty scored) Cristiane; (penalty scored) Alanna; (penalty missed) Dana; (penalty scored) Gislaine

Estádio Carneirão, Vitória
23 November 2012
19:00

Vitória das Tabocas (Brazil)	3 – 4	(Chile) Colo Colo
Chú Santos 26'; Thaisinha 59', 78'	Report	Ascanio 6'; Araya 10'; Aedo 37'; Villamayor 80'

Estádio Carneirão, Vitória

=== Third-place match ===
25 November 2012
19:00

São José (Brazil)	1 – 0	(Brazil) Vitória
Cristiane 69'

Estádio Carneirão, Vitória

=== Final ===
25 November 2012
21:00

Foz Cataratas (Brazil)	0 – 0	(Chile) Colo Colo
Penalties
Nenê (penalty missed); Bia (penalty scored); Andressa (penalty scored); Rilany (penalty missed)	2–4	(penalty scored) C. Soto; (penalty scored) Lara; (penalty scored) Araya; (penalty scored) Villamayor

Estádio Carneirão, Vitória

== Top goalscorers ==
Rank	Name	Team	Goals
1	Cristiane	(Brazil) São José	7
2	Daiane Moretti	(Brazil) Foz Cataratas	6
3	Chú Santos	(Brazil) Vitória das Tabocas	5
	Thaisinha	(Brazil) Vitória das Tabocas	5
5	Andressa	(Brazil) Foz Cataratas	4
	Yusmery Ascanio	(Chile) Colo Colo	4
7	Karen Araya	(Chile) Colo Colo	3
	Estefanía Banini	(Chile) Colo Colo	3
	Mónica Quinteros	(Ecuador) Deportivo Quito	3
10	Ludmila Manicler	(Argentina) Boca Juniors	2
	Francisca Lara	(Chile) Colo Colo	2
	Karla Torres	(Venezuela) Caracas	2
	Giovânia	(Brazil) Foz Cataratas	2
	Yanara Aedo	(Chile) Colo Colo	2
	Gloria Villamayor	(Chile) Colo Colo	2
	Paula Botero	(Colombia) Formas Íntimas	2
	Yisela Cuesta	(Colombia) Formas Íntimas	2
