= Bárbara Muñoz =

Bárbara Muñoz may refer to:

- Bárbara Muñoz (singer)
- Bárbara Muñoz (footballer)
