= Pierina (name) =

Pierina is an Italian and Spanish feminine given name. Notable people with the name include:

- Pierina Borsani (1909–1960), Italian female basketball player and athlete
- Pierina Carcelén, Peruvian actress, model and dancer
- Pierina Dealessi (1894–1983), Italian-born Argentine actress
- Pierina Gilli (1911–1991), Italian Roman Catholic visionary
- Pierina Legnani (1868–1930), Italian ballerina
- Pierina Montenegro (born 1986), Uruguayan footballer
- Pierina Morosini (1931–1957), Italian Roman Catholic from Bergamo who was killed after a man tried to rape her

== See also ==
- Maria Pierina (1890–1945), Roman Catholic religious Sister
