= Denise Pesantes =

Ecuadorian footballer (born 1988)

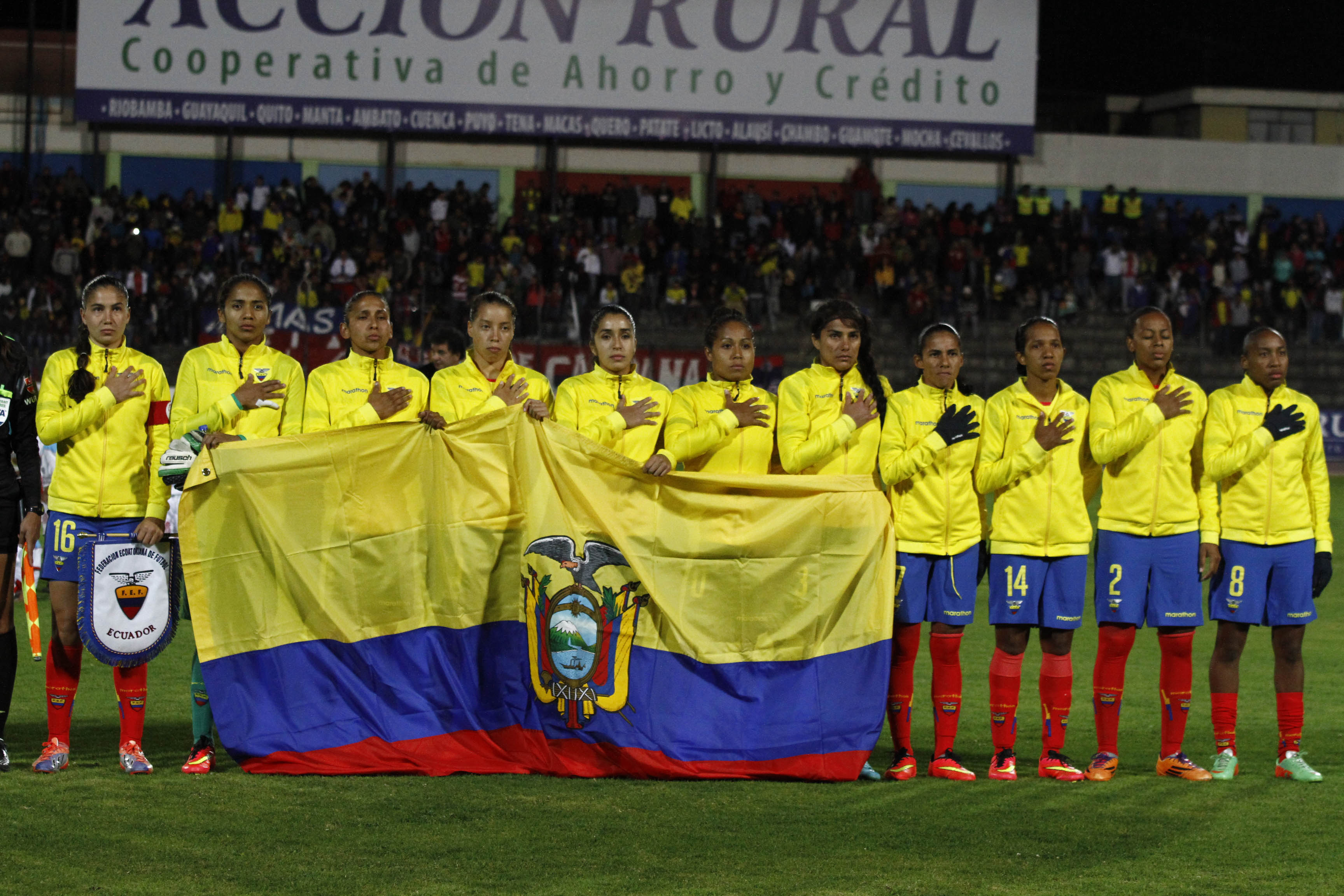
- Pesantes representing Ecuador at the 2014 Copa América Femenina

Personal information
- Full name: Denise Andrea Pesantes Tenorio
- Date of birth: 14 January 1988 (age 38)
- Place of birth: Santa Cruz Island (Galápagos), Ecuador
- Height: 1.60 m (5 ft 3 in)
- Position: Forward

Team information
- Current team: Carneras UPS

Senior career*
Years	Team	Apps	(Gls)
2004–2010	Pichincha selection	12	(4)
2010–2013	ESPE		
2013–2014	Quito FC		
2014	Rocafuerte FC		
2014–2015	Galápagos SC		
2015	Rocafuerte FC		
2015	Galápagos SC		
2015-2016	Quito FC		
2016-	Carneras UPS		

International career^{‡}
2004	Ecuador U19	1+	(1)
	Ecuador	35	(3)
- * Club domestic league appearances and goals as of 13:28, 22 June 2015 (UTC) ‡ National team caps and goals as of 17:33, 17 June 2015 (UTC)

Denise Andrea Pesantes Tenorio (born 14 January 1988) is an Ecuadorian professional footballer who plays for Carneras UPS. She was part of the Ecuadorian squad for the 2015 FIFA Women's World Cup.

== International career ==
Pesantes represented Ecuador at the 2004 South American U-19 Women's Championship.
