= Daniela Maler =

Bolivian footballer (born 1986)

Personal information
- Full name: Daniela Maler Pérez
- Date of birth: 4 September 1986 (age 40)

Senior career*
Years	Team	Apps	(Gls)
- Gerimex

International career^{‡}
2004	Bolivia U19	1+	(1)
2006	Bolivia	4	(0)
- * Club domestic league appearances and goals ‡ National team caps and goals as of 17 November 2006

Daniela Maler Pérez (born 4 September 1986) is a Bolivian former footballer. She has been a member of the Bolivia women's national team.

== Club career ==
Maler has played for Gerimex in Bolivia at the 2011 Copa Libertadores Femenina.

== International career ==
Maler represented Bolivia at the 2004 South American U-19 Women's Championship. At senior level, she played the 2006 South American Women's Football Championship.
