= Catalina Pérez (footballer, born 1989) =

Argentine footballer

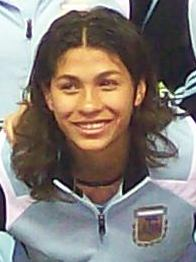

Personal information
- Full name: Catalina Itatí Pérez Castaño
- Date of birth: 16 February 1989 (age 37)
- Position: Defender

Team information
- Current team: River Plate

Senior career*
Years	Team	Apps	(Gls)
- River Plate
- Boca Juniors
–2018	Platense		
2018–	River Plate		

International career^{‡}
2004	Argentina U19	1+	(1)
	Argentina	16	(0)
- * Club domestic league appearances and goals ‡ National team caps and goals as of 10 September 2007 (before the 2007 FIFA Women's World Cup)

Catalina Itatí Pérez Castaño (born 16 February 1989) is an Argentine footballer who plays as a defender for River Plate. She is a former member of the Argentina women's national team.

== International career ==
Pérez represented Argentina at the 2004 South American U-19 Women's Championship. At senior level, she was part of the team at the 2007 FIFA Women's World Cup.
