= Lara Esponda =

Argentine footballer (born 2005)

Personal information
- Date of birth: 5 November 2005 (age 21)
- Place of birth: Buenos Aires, Argentina
- Height: 1.68 m (5 ft 6 in)
- Position: Goalkeeper

Team information
- Current team: River Plate
- Number: 1

Youth career
- River Plate

Senior career*
Years	Team	Apps	(Gls)
2020–	River Plate		

International career^{‡}
2022	Argentina U20	4	(0)
2026–	Argentina	1	(0)
- * Club domestic league appearances and goals ‡ National team caps and goals as of 11 March 2026

Lara Esponda (born 5 November 2005) is an Argentine footballer who plays as a goalkeeper for River Plate in Argentina's Women's Primera A.

== Early years and club career ==
Esponda began playing football with a youth team in Ituzaingó, Argentina. She started as a forward, but was asked to fill in for an absent goalkeeper, and has played that position since.

She started advanced training at the age of 9, and at 11 began training with the first team, joining River Plate's first team in the 2019–20 season. On 9 March 2020, at the age of 14, she made her debut, becoming the youngest goalkeeper to play in Women's Primera A, the top women's football league in Argentina. In 2018 she was champion of the Under-14 Development League with River Plate as the starting goalkeeper, beating the women's team of the Chubut Valley League 1–0. In January 2023 she signed her first professional contract.

== International career ==
After playing on the national under-15 team, on 13 October 2020, she was called up to the Argentina national under-17 team.

Esponda was called up to the Argentina national U-20 team in February 2022 to play in the 2022 South American Under-20 Women's Football Championship in Chile. She conceded two goals, both in the loss to Venezuela. La albiceleste finished third and did not advance to the next round. It was part of a mixed call between sub-18 and sub-20 for the COTIF La Alcudia 2022 tournament, where her team finished runner-up.

Esponda earned a call-up to the Argentina women's national team for the 2023 FIFA Women's World Cup.

== Career statistics ==
=== International ===
As of match played 7 March 2026

Appearances and goals by national team and year
National team	Year	Apps	Goals
Argentina	2026	1	0
Total		1	0
