= 2004 South American U-19 Women's Championship =

Tournament details
- Host country: Bolivia, Brazil, Paraguay, Venezuela
- City: 4
- Dates: 11 – 15 May 2004 (qualification); 25 – 29 May 2004 (Final round)
- Teams: 4 (10 with qualification)
- Venue: 1 (4 with qualification) (in 1 (4) host cities)

Final positions
- Champions: Brazil (1st title)
- Runners-up: Paraguay
- Third place: Ecuador
- Fourth place: Bolivia

The 2004 South American Under-19 Women's Football Championship was held in Encarnación, Paraguay (group A), Caracas, Venezuela (group B), Sucre, Bolivia (group C) and in Angra dos Reis, Brazil (Final round), from 11 to 29 May 2004. It was the first edition of the South American Youth Women's Championship and the only one with an age limit of 19 years. Team Brazil won this tournament and qualified for the 2004 FIFA U-19 Women's World Championship.

== First round ==
=== Group A ===
Team	Pld	W	D	L	GF	GA	GD	Pts
Paraguay	2	2	0	0	7	2	+5	6
Uruguay	2	1	0	1	2	5	–3	3
Argentina	2	0	0	2	1	3	–2	0

11 May 2004

Paraguay	5 – 1	Uruguay
Nadia Rodas 10'; Lourdes Martínez 25'; Jéssica Mendoza 81'; Anabel Rodríguez 84'; Mónica Vega 89'		13' Carla Quinteros

Encarnación
13 May 2004

Argentina	0 – 1	Uruguay
		25' Carla Quinteros

Encarnación
15 May 2004

Paraguay	2 – 1	Argentina
Jéssica Mendoza 10'; Adriana Ruiz 86'		Pérez 48'

Encarnación

=== Group B ===
Team	Pld	W	D	L	GF	GA	GD	Pts
Ecuador	2	2	0	0	6	1	+5	6
Colombia	2	1	0	1	4	2	+2	3
Venezuela	2	0	0	2	0	7	–7	0

11 May 2004

Venezuela	0 – 4	Ecuador
		Wendy Monroy 15'; Quinteros 65', 76'; Rosa Coello 74'

Caracas
13 May 2004

Colombia	1 – 2	Ecuador
Carolina Ordóñez 49'		Rosa Coello 66'; Quinteros 75'

Caracas
15 May 2004

Venezuela	0 – 3	Colombia
		Diana Jarry 28'; Ilana Milkes 44'; Manuela Pizarro 75'

Caracas

=== Group C ===
Team	Pld	W	D	L	GF	GA	GD	Pts
Bolivia	2	2	0	0	14	1	+13	6
Peru	2	1	0	1	5	5	0	3
Chile	2	0	0	2	1	14	–13	0

11 May 2004

Bolivia	9 – 1	Chile
Loayza 1', 79', 83', 89', 90'; Padilla 10', 41'; Elisabeth Pérez 24'; Maler 58'		59' Lesly Herrera

Sucre
13 May 2004

Peru	5 – 0	Chile
Tristán 18', 90'; Lissett Díaz 36'; Cortez 37'; Leslie Guerrero 71'

Sucre
15 May 2004

Bolivia	5 – 0	Peru
Mery Salazar 10'; Elizabeth Pérez 34', 54'; Analisse Ríos 63'; Loayza 65'

Sucre

== Final round ==
Three group winners from the first round advanced to the final round. Team Brazil received a bye to this round.

Team	Pld	W	D	L	GF	GA	GD	Pts
Brazil	3	3	0	0	16	4	+12	9
Paraguay	3	2	0	1	5	5	0	6
Ecuador	3	1	0	2	4	10	–6	3
Bolivia	3	0	0	3	1	7	–6	0

25 May 2004

Brazil	7 – 2	Ecuador
Kelly 10'; Dayane 20', 76' (pen.); Tatiana 41', 78'; Maurine 58' (pen.); Cristiane 73'		Thaiane 47' (o.g.); Pesantes 73'

Angra dos Reis
25 May 2004

Bolivia	0 – 1	Paraguay
		Lorena Soto 83'

Angra dos Reis

27 May 2004

Paraguay	2 – 0	Ecuador
Jéssica Mendoza 20' (pen.); Nadia Rodas 81'

Angra dos Reis
27 May 2004

Brazil	4 – 0	Bolivia
Cristiane 32'; Renata 45+1'; Kelly 63'; Maurine 66'

Angra dos Reis

29 May 2004

Brazil	5 – 2	Paraguay
Dayane 27', 84' (pen.); Maurine 30'; Tatiana 90+2'; Elaine 90+3'		Adriana Ruiz 24'; Jéssica Mendoza 45+2'

Angra dos Reis
29 May 2004

Ecuador	2 – 1	Bolivia
Claudia Cindy Camacho 2' (pen.), 7' (pen.)		Analisse Ríos 71'

Angra dos Reis

2004 South American Women's U-19 Football champions

Brazil
First title
