= Nicole Hain =

Paraguayan footballer (born 2000)

Personal information
- Full name: Nicole Janet Hain Echeverría
- Date of birth: 4 August 2000 (age 26)
- Place of birth: Fernando de la Mora, Paraguay
- Height: 1.51 m (4 ft 11 in)
- Position: Forward

Team information
- Current team: San Lorenzo

Senior career*
Years	Team	Apps	(Gls)
201?–2020	River Plate		
2020–	San Lorenzo		

International career^{‡}
- Argentina U20
2019–	Argentina	1	(1)
- * Club domestic league appearances and goals ‡ National team caps and goals as of 7 November 2019

Nicole Janet Hain Echeverría (born 4 August 2000) is a futsal player and a footballer who plays as a forward for Campeonato de Fútbol Femenino club San Lorenzo de Almagro. Born in Paraguay, she moved to Argentina at young age, became a naturalized citizen of Argentina and is now a member of the Argentina women's national team.

== International career ==
Hain is eligible to play for Paraguay, where she was born, or for Argentina, where she has grown up. She chose the latter. At first, she was called up to the under–20 level, but was later invited to train with the senior team. She made her international debut for Argentina on 7 November 2019, in a 2–1 away friendly won to coincidentally Paraguay.

=== International goals ===
Scores and results list Argentina's goal tally first

No.	Date	Venue	Opponent	Score	Result	Competition
1	7 November 2019	Estadio Adrián Jara, Asunción, Paraguay	Paraguay	1–1	2–1	Friendly
