= Club Atlético River Plate (women) =

Women's football team in Buenos Aires, Argentina

River Plate
- Full name: Club Atlético River Plate
- Nicknames: Las Millonarias ('The Millionaires')
- Founded: 1991; 35 years ago
- Ground: Monumental auxiliary field Buenos Aires, Argentina
- Chairman: María Laura Barbaresi
- Manager: Daniela Díaz
- League: Campeonato Femenino
- 2023: 4°
- Website: https://www.cariverplate.com.ar/futbol-femenino
Home colours	Away colours

Club Atlético River Plate Women (Spanish: River Plate Femenino) is the Argentine women's football section of the homonymous club. Established in 1991, it was the inaugural champion of the Primera A and has won the tournament 11 times. At the Copa Libertadores, River has made two appearances in 2017 and 2020, their best result was placing third, at the 2017 Copa Libertadores Femenina.

== History ==
In 1991, River Plate's first championship team was coached by Rubén “Coco” Torres and the players of that team were: Norma Enciso, Patricia Riella, Cynthia Luporini, Adriana Asperes, Mónica Pérez, Karina Morales, Emilce Ahumada, Andrea Ochoa, Viviana Rossi, Celia Lazarte, Claudia Caridde, Beatriz Capotosto, Laura Magdalena, María Ghinella, Paola Herrera, Cynthia Almeyda y Griselda Ojeda. By 2003, River was the team with most championships 8 (including a five-years streak between 1993 and 1997), but it was surpassed a year later by its archrivals, Boca Juniors. In 2022, River Plate won the second edition of the Copa Federal by defeating Belgrano 2–0.

== Players ==
=== Current squad ===
As of 27 february 2023.

Note: Flags indicate national team as defined under FIFA eligibility rules; some limited exceptions apply. Players may hold more than one non-FIFA nationality.

No.	Pos.	Nation	Player
1	GK	ARG	Lara Esponda
2	DF	ARG	Giuliana González
3	DF	ARG	Milagros Otazú
4	DF	ARG	Stephanie Melgarejo
5	MF	ARG	Agustina Vargas
6	DF	ECU	Tamara Angulo
7	FW	ARG	Catalina Primo
8	FW	ARG	Romina Gómez
9	FW	ARG	Martina del Trecco
10	FW	URU	Carolina Birizamberri (captain)
14	GK	ARG	Daniela Pontel
16	MF	ARG	Paloma Fagiano
17	MF	ARG	Ayelén Acuña
18	MF	ARG	Ludmila Galli
19	DF	ARG	Abril Reche
20	FW	ARG	Francisca Altgelt
21	DF	ARG	Camila Ayelén Duarte

No.	Pos.	Nation	Player
22	DF	ARG	Rocío Iuzzolino
22	MF	ARG	Morena Miranda
23	DF	URU	Laura Felipe
24	DF	ARG	Belén Ludueña
25	GK	ARG	Martina Krotter
26	DF	ARG	Sol Córdoba
27	DF	ARG	Juana Cangaro
28	MF	ARG	Evelyn Sofía Domínguez
30	GK	ARG	Ludmila Sousa
32	FW	ARG	Julieta Romero
34	MF	ARG	Brenda Flores
—	FW	ARG	Victoria Costa
—	MF	ARG	Milagros Díaz
—	DF	ARG	Luciana Duarte
—	FW	ARG	Delfina Lombardi Larrere
—	DF	ARG	Celena Magalí Molina
—	FW	BRA	Carmel Oliveira

=== Notable players ===
==== FIFA World Cup participants ====
List of players that were called up for a FIFA Women's World Cup while playing for River Plate. In brackets, the tournament played:

- (Argentina) Romina Ferro (2003)
- (Argentina) Noelia López (2003)
- (Argentina) Fabiana Vallejos (2003)
- (Argentina) Mercedes Pereyra (2007)
- (Argentina) Catalina Pérez (2007)
- (Argentina) Gabriela Chávez (2019)
- (Argentina) Dalila Ippólito (2019)
- (Argentina) Lara Esponda (2023)

== Copa Libertadores record ==
Season	Round	Opponent	Result	Scorers	Position
2017	Group A	(Ecuador) Unión Española	1–1	Romero	1 / 4
2017	Group A	(Paraguay) Deportivo Capiatá	2–1	Birizamberri 2	1 / 4
2017	Group A	(Venezuela) Estudiantes de Guárico	1–0	Pereyra	1 / 4
2017	Semifinals	(Chile) Colo-Colo	0–2		SF
2017	Third place match	(Paraguay) Cerro Porteño	2–1	Birizamberri 2	3rd place
2020	Group C	(Paraguay) Sol de América	0–0		1 / 4
2020	Group C	(Colombia) Santa Fe	1–0	Birizamberri	1 / 4
2020	Group C	(Venezuela) Atlético SC	3–0	Costa, Del Trecco, Martelli	1 / 4
2020	Quarter-finals	(Brazil) Ferroviária	0–1		QF

== Honours ==
=== Titles ===
Type	Competition	Titles	Winning years
National (League)	Primera División A	11	1991, 1993, 1994, 1995, 1996, 1997, 2002 Apertura, 2003 Clausura, 2009 Clausura, 2010 Clausura, 2016–17
National (Cups)	Copa Federal	1	2022
