= Lorena Cortez =

Peruvian footballer (born 1988)

Personal information
- Full name: Lorena Patricia Cortez Chávez
- Date of birth: 19 February 1988 (age 38)
- Height: 1.62 m (5 ft 4 in)
- Position: Defender

Senior career*
Years	Team	Apps	(Gls)
- ML CF

International career^{‡}
2004	Peru U19	1+	(1)
2006–2018	Peru	4	(0)
- * Club domestic league appearances and goals ‡ National team caps and goals as of 12 April 2018

Lorena Patricia Cortez Chávez (born 19 February 1988) is a Peruvian footballer who plays as a defender. She was a member of the Peru women's national team.

== International career ==
Cortez represented Peru at the 2004 South American U-19 Women's Championship. At senior level, she played two Copa América Femenina editions (2006 and 2018).
