= Giuliana González =

Argentine footballer

Personal information
- Full name: Giuliana Anabel González Ranzuglia
- Date of birth: 18 June 2002 (age 24)
- Place of birth: José C. Paz, Buenos Aires, Argentina
- Height: 1.72 m (5 ft 8 in)
- Position: Defender

Team information
- Current team: River Plate
- Number: 13

Senior career*
Years	Team	Apps	(Gls)
- River Plate

International career^{‡}
2020	Argentina U20	3	(0)
2021–	Argentina	1	(0)
- * Club domestic league appearances and goals ‡ National team caps and goals as of 8 April 2021.

Giuliana Anabel González Ranzuglia (born 18 June 2002), known as Giuliana González, is an Argentine footballer who plays as a defender for River Plate and the Argentina women's national team.

== Club career ==
González has played for River Plate in Argentina.

== International career ==
González represented Argentina at the 2020 South American Under-20 Women's Football Championship. She made her senior debut on 8 April 2021 in a 0–0 friendly draw against Venezuela.
