= Mercedes Pereyra =

Argentine footballer (born 1987)

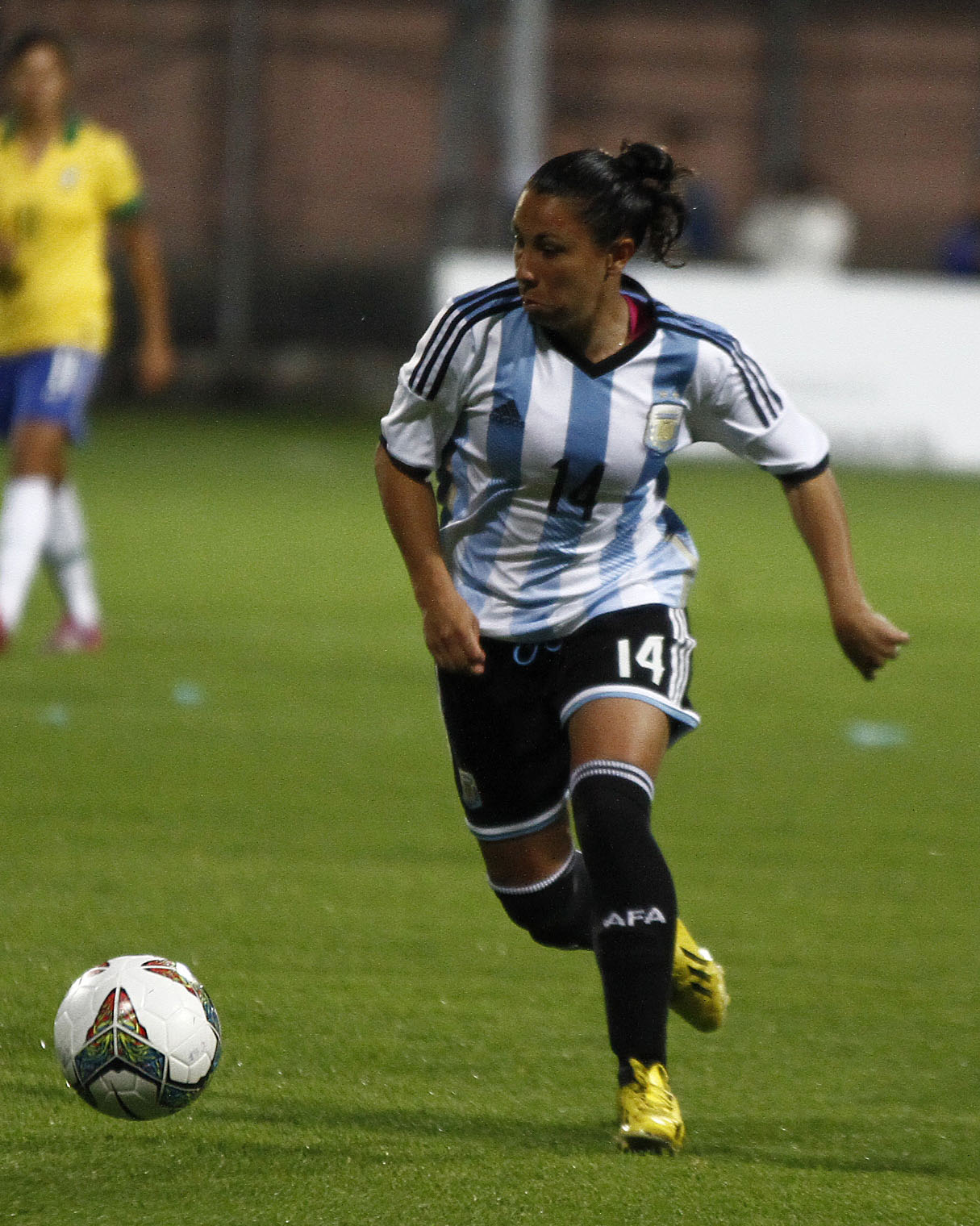
- Mercedes Pereyra playing against Brazil at the 2014 Copa América Femenina.

Personal information
- Date of birth: 7 May 1987 (age 39)
- Place of birth: General Rodríguez, Argentina
- Position: Forward

Team information
- Current team: River Plate
- Number: 9

Senior career*
Years	Team	Apps	(Gls)
2008–2016	River Plate		
2017	Atlético Huila		
2018–	River Plate		

International career
2007–2014	Argentina	0 (?)	(0)
Medal record
Women's football
Representing Argentina
South American Games
Gold medal – first place	2014 Santiago	Team
- * Club domestic league appearances and goals

Mercedes Pereyra (born 7 May 1987) is an Argentine footballer who plays as a forward for River Plate. She played for the Argentina women's national football team at the 2008 Summer Olympics.

== See also ==
- Argentina at the 2008 Summer Olympics
