= Yusmery Ascanio =

Venezuelan footballer (born 1990)

Personal information
- Full name: Yusmery del Valle Ascanio Nieves
- Date of birth: 20 December 1990 (age 35)
- Place of birth: San Juan de los Morros, Venezuela
- Height: 1.63 m (5 ft 4 in)
- Positions: Midfielder; defender

Team information
- Current team: Colo-Colo
- Number: 10

Senior career*
Years	Team	Apps	(Gls)
- Estudiantes Guárico
- Caracas
2012–	Colo-Colo		

International career^{‡}
2010–2023	Venezuela	5	(0)
- * Club domestic league appearances and goals ‡ National team caps and goals as of 2 August 2010

Yusmery del Valle Ascanio Nieves (born 20 December 1990) is a Venezuelan footballer who plays as a midfielder for Chilean Championship club Colo-Colo and the Venezuela women's national team.

In her long career, she has been part of the Venezuelan squad at the 2010 South American Women's Football Championship, the 2014 Copa América Femenina, and the 2022 Copa América Femenina.

== Club career ==
Ascanio has played the Copa Libertadores with Caracas FC.
