= Carolina Armijo =

Chilean footballer (born 1987)

Personal information
- Full name: Carolina Andrea Armijo Lira
- Date of birth: 28 November 1987 (age 38)
- Place of birth: Santiago, Chile
- Height: 1.63 m (5 ft 4 in)
- Position: Goalkeeper

Team information
- Current team: Chile (women) (goalkeeping coach)

Youth career
- Universidad de Chile
- Everton
- Colo-Colo

Senior career*
Years	Team	Apps	(Gls)
2012–2017	Colo-Colo		
2018	Cúcuta Deportivo		
2018–2022	Colo-Colo		

International career
2018–2020	Chile		
- * Club domestic league appearances and goals

Carolina Andrea Armijo Lira (born 28 November 1987) is a Chilean former footballer who played as a goalkeeper. She is currently the goalkeeping coach of the Chile women's national team.

== Playing career ==
As a youth player, Armijo had stints with Universidad de Chile and Everton. At senior level, she played almost all her career for Colo-Colo, winning her first league title in 2012. In the same year, she won the Copa Libertadores.

Abroad, she had a stint with Colombian club Cúcuta Deportivo in 2018.

At international level, she was a member of the Chile squad that was the runner-up in the 2018 Copa América Femenina. She went on being a member of the team until 2020.

A player of Colo-Colo until 2022, she made official her retirement in 2023.

== Coaching career ==
As a goalkeeping coach, she was a member of the technical staff of Luis Mena in Colo-Colo in 2022 and 2023. She followed him in the Chile national team.

== Personal life ==
At the age of eighteen, she worked in a McDonald's restaurant. She later graduated as a podiatrist.

== Honours ==
Colo-Colo

- Copa Libertadores Femenina: 2012
