= Carneras UPS =

Women's football club based in Cuenca, Ecuador

Carneras UPS is a women's football club based in Cuenca, Ecuador.

== History ==
Carneras UPS has a youth team and senior team that has competed in the Ecuadorian women's top flight.
