= Bia Vaz =

Brazilian footballer (born 1985)

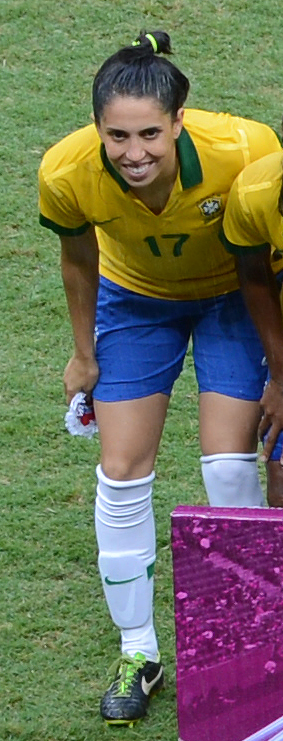

Personal information
- Full name: Beatriz Vaz e Silva
- Date of birth: 7 October 1985 (age 41)
- Place of birth: Brazil
- Height: 1.67 m (5 ft 6 in)
- Position: Midfielder

College career
Years	Team	Apps	(Gls)
2008–2009	Southern Nazarene Crimson Storm		

Senior career*
Years	Team	Apps	(Gls)
2004–2005	Santos		
2006–2007	SABESP		
2010–2012	Foz Cataratas		
2013–2014	Ferroviária		
2015	Boston Breakers	10	(0)
2015	São José	5	(0)
2016	Flamengo	10	(0)
2017	Audax	13	(0)

International career
2013–2015	Brazil	12	(0)
- * Club domestic league appearances and goals

Beatriz Vaz e Silva (born 7 October 1985), commonly known as Bia or Bia Vaz, is a Brazilian soccer coach and former player. As a "volante" (English: defensive midfielder), she played for Brazilian clubs including Santos, Ferroviára, São José and Flamengo. She represented the Boston Breakers of the National Women's Soccer League (NWSL) and played for the Brazil national team.

She was waived by the Boston Breakers in October 2015.

== Coaching career ==
In 2017, while still playing for Audax, Bia Vaz was invited onto Vadão's national team coaching staff. She retained her position as an assistant coach when Pia Sundhage took over as Brazil's head coach in 2019.

== Honours ==
Ferroviária

- Campeonato Brasileiro de Futebol Feminino: 2014
- Copa do Brasil de Futebol Feminino: 2014
- Campeonato Paulista de Futebol Feminino: 2013

Foz Cataratas

- Copa do Brasil de Futebol Feminino: 2011

Flamengo

- Campeonato Brasileiro de Futebol Feminino: 2016
