= María Yesica Ramos =

Bolivian footballer (born 1995)

Personal information
- Full name: María Yesica Ramos Cesari
- Date of birth: 11 August 1995 (age 31)
- Position: Forward

Senior career*
Years	Team	Apps	(Gls)
- Mundo Futuro

International career^{‡}
2018	Bolivia	1	(0)
- * Club domestic league appearances and goals ‡ National team caps and goals as of 13 April 2018

María Yesica Ramos Cesari (born 11 August 1995) is a Bolivian footballer who plays as a forward for the Bolivia women's national team.

== Early life ==
Ramos hails from the Santa Cruz Department.

== International career ==
Ramos played for Bolivia at senior level in the 2018 Copa América Femenina.
