= Tina Lingsch =

Chilean footballer (born 2001)

Personal information
- Full name: Tina Constanze Lingsch Rosenfeld
- Date of birth: 23 December 2001 (age 24)
- Place of birth: Santiago, Chile
- Height: 1.62 m (5 ft 4 in)
- Position: Goalkeeper

Team information
- Current team: Recklinghausen
- Number: 1

Youth career
- Universidad Católica

Senior career*
Years	Team	Apps	(Gls)
2017–2018	Universidad Católica		
2019–2020	Universidad de Chile		
2020–2021	Bochum II	4	(0)
2020–2021	Bochum	2	(0)
2021–2024	Borussia Mönchengladbach	36	(0)
2024–	Recklinghausen	7	(0)

International career^{‡}
2020	Chile U20	0	(0)
- * Club domestic league appearances and goals as of 19 October 2024 ‡ National team caps and goals as of 20 July 2023

Tina Constanze Lingsch Rosenfeld (born 23 December 2001) is a Chilean footballer who plays as a goalkeeper for German club Recklinghausen.

== Early life ==
As a child, Lingsch attended the Deutsche Schule Santiago.

== Youth career ==
Lingsch joined the youth academy of Chilean side Universidad Católica. She was nicknamed "Tina Pop" while playing for the club.

== Club career ==
Lingsch started her senior career with Chilean side Universidad Católica. In 2020, she signed for German side Bochum II. In 2021, she signed for German third-tier side Borussia Mönchengladbach, debuting for the club during a 0–4 loss to Borussia Bocholt. In 2023, she helped the club achieve promotion to the German second tier.

In the second half of 2024, Lingsch switched to Recklinghausen.

== International career ==
Lingsch has represented Chile internationally at youth level.

== Style of play ==
Lingsch mainly operates as a goalkeeper and is known for her ball distribution and ball control.

== Personal life ==
Lingsch was born in Chile to German parents.

In 2020, Lingsch applied to study medicine at Ruhr University Bochum.
