= Mariana Caucota =

Bolivian footballer (born 1994)

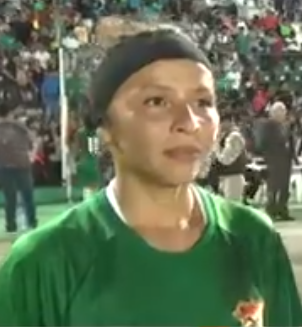
- At a friendly against Puerto Rico in 2019

Personal information
- Full name: Mariana Caucota Castro
- Date of birth: 22 April 1994 (age 32)
- Place of birth: Cercado, Tarija, Bolivia
- Height: 1.61 m (5 ft 3 in)
- Position: Midfielder

Senior career*
Years	Team	Apps	(Gls)
- San Martín de Porres

International career^{‡}
2017–2018	Bolivia	5	(0)
- * Club domestic league appearances and goals ‡ National team caps and goals as of 13 April 2018

Mariana Caucota Castro (born 22 April 1994) is a Bolivian footballer who plays as a midfielder for the Bolivia women's national team.

== International career ==
Caucota played for Bolivia at senior level in the 2018 Copa América Femenina.
