= Tamara Angulo =

Ecuadorian footballer (born 1998)

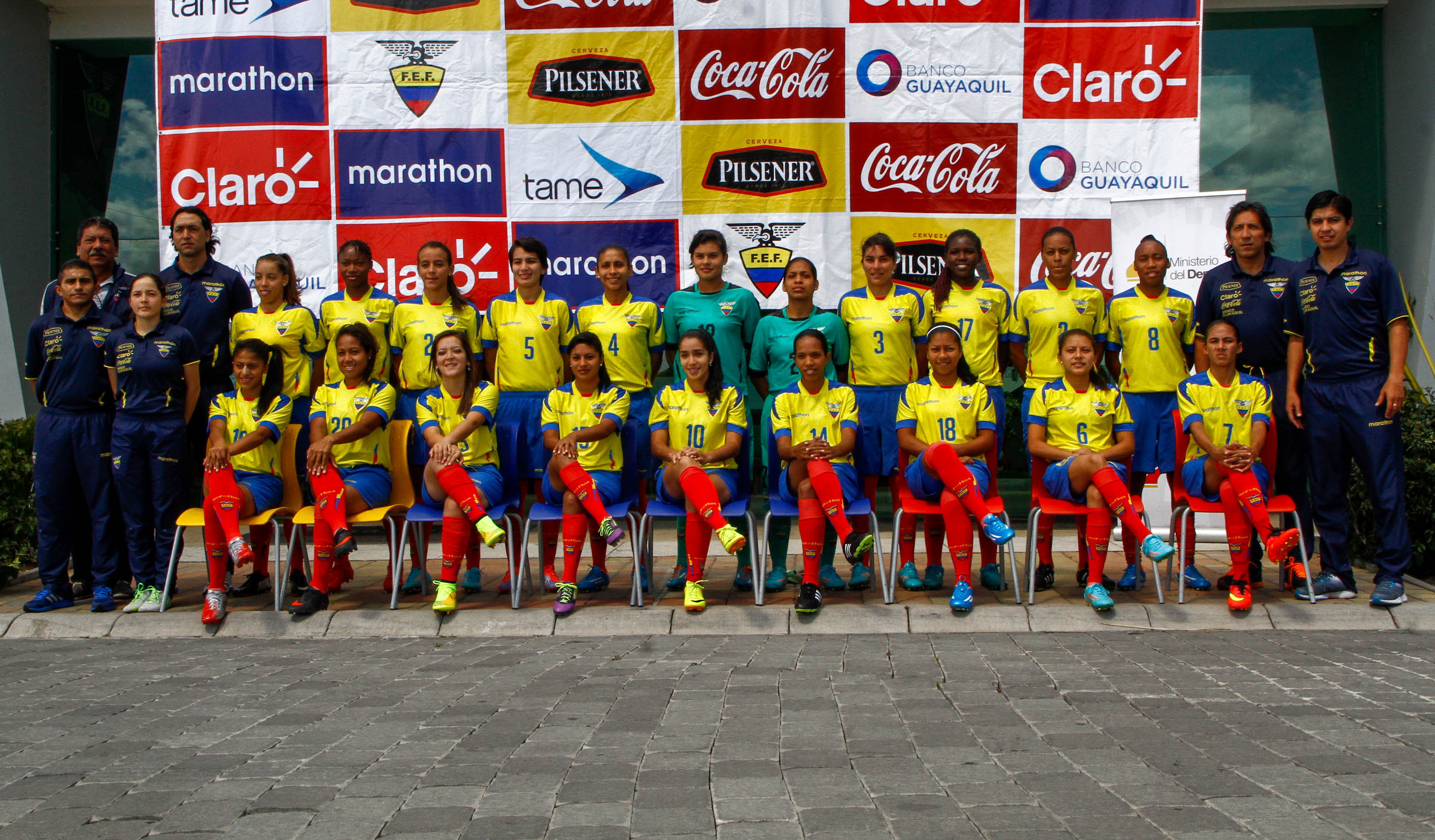

Personal information
- Full name: Tamara Arelis Angulo Cuero
- Date of birth: 11 February 1998 (age 28)
- Place of birth: Guayaquil, Ecuador
- Height: 1.69 m (5 ft 7 in)
- Position: Centre back

Team information
- Current team: River Plate
- Number: 6

Senior career*
Years	Team	Apps	(Gls)
–2014	Unión Española		
2014–2015	Alianza del Pailón		
2015	Unión Española		
2015–2016	Alianza del Pailón		
2016–2019	Unión Española		
2019–2022	Independiente del Valle	23+	(5+)
2023–	River Plate	0	(0)

International career^{‡}
2018–	Ecuador	3	(0)
- * Club domestic league appearances and goals as of 12 September 2019 ‡ National team caps and goals as of 11 April 2018

Tamara Arelis Angulo Cuero (born 11 February 1998) is an Ecuadorian footballer who plays as a centre back for Argentine club River Plate and the Ecuador women's national team.
