= Mónica Quinteros =

Ecuadorian footballer (born 1988)

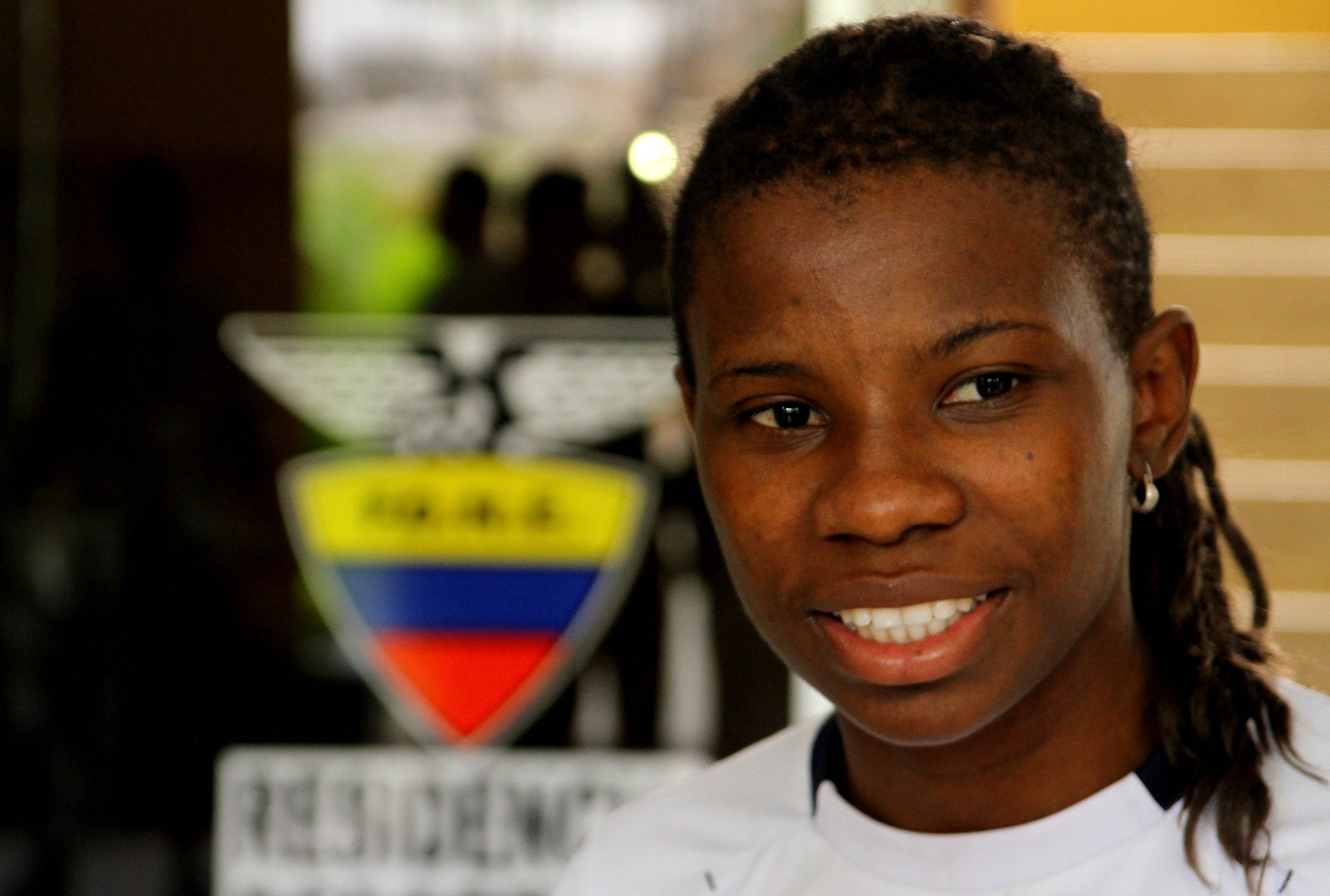

Personal information
- Full name: Mónica Rebeca Quinteros Cabeza
- Date of birth: 5 July 1988 (age 38)
- Place of birth: Santa Rosa, Ecuador
- Height: 1.62 m (5 ft 4 in)
- Position: Forward

Team information
- Current team: 7 de febrero

Senior career*
Years	Team	Apps	(Gls)
2003–2006	La Troncal		
2006	Guayas selection	10	(13)
2007–2010	La Troncal		
2010–2013	Guayas selection	5	(7)
2010	→ Deportivo Quito (loan)		
2011	→ LDU Quito (loan)		
2013	Los Rios selection		
2013–2014	7 de Febrero		
2014–2015	ESPE		
2015–2016	7 de Febrero		
2016	Kiryat Gat	13	(8)
2016-	7 de febrero		

International career^{‡}
2004	Ecuador U19	2+	(3)
2002–2015	Ecuador	45	(8)
- * Club domestic league appearances and goals as of 14 May 2016 ‡ National team caps and goals as of 15:43, 17 June 2015 (UTC)

Mónica Rebeca Quinteros Cabeza (born 5 July 1988) is an Ecuadorian professional footballer who plays for 7 de febrero. She was part of the Ecuadorian squad at the 2015 FIFA Women's World Cup.

== Club career ==
In February 2016, Quinteros joined Israeli Ligat Nashim club Kiryat Gat on a four-month contract.

== International career ==
Quinteros represented Ecuador at the 2004 South American U-19 Women's Championship.
