= Julia Suarez =

Peruvian footballer (born 1996)

Personal information
- Full name: Julia Carolina Suárez Miranda
- Date of birth: 1 November 1996 (age 30)
- Place of birth: Virginia, United States
- Height: 1.63 m (5 ft 4 in)
- Positions: Forward; midfielder

Youth career
- C.D Hylton
- PWSI Courage

College career
Years	Team	Apps	(Gls)
2015–2018	VCU Rams	70	(18)

International career^{‡}
- Peru U20
2018	Peru	3	(0)
- ‡ National team caps and goals as of 12 April 2018

Julia Carolina Suárez Miranda (born 1 November 1996) is a footballer who plays as a forward. Born in the United States, she represented the Peru national team.

Her mother is Peruvian and her father is Venezuelan.
