= Laura Romero =

Paraguayan footballer (born 1990)

Personal information
- Full name: Laura Elisa Romero Jara
- Date of birth: 23 March 1990 (age 36)
- Place of birth: Luque, Paraguay
- Position: Forward

Team information
- Current team: San Lorenzo

Senior career*
Years	Team	Apps	(Gls)
2009–2011	Olimpia		
2012–2015	Sportivo Luqueño		
2016	River Plate	15	(19)
2016	Sportivo Luqueño		
2017	River Plate		
2018	Kindermann		
2018	Sportivo Luqueño		
2018–2019	Cerro Porteño		
2019	Sol de América		
2020–	San Lorenzo		

International career^{‡}
2019–	Paraguay	1	(0)
- * Club domestic league appearances and goals ‡ National team caps and goals as of 7 November 2019

Laura Elisa Romero Jara (born 23 March 1990) is a Paraguayan footballer who plays as a forward for Argentine club San Lorenzo de Almagro and the Paraguay women's national team.

== Club career ==
Romero started in Olimpia. In 2012, she moved to Sportivo Luqueño.

== International career ==
Romero made her senior debut for Paraguay on 7 November 2019, in a 1–2 home friendly loss to Argentina.
