= Marlene Mendoza =

Paraguayan footballer (born 1994)

Personal information
- Full name: Marlene Beatriz Mendoza Bobadilla
- Date of birth: 5 April 1994 (age 32)
- Place of birth: Paraguay
- Height: 1.71 m (5 ft 7 in)
- Position: Defender

Team information
- Current team: Cerro Porteño
- Number: 5

Senior career*
Years	Team	Apps	(Gls)
- Cerro Porteño

International career^{‡}
2018	Paraguay	1	(0)
- * Club domestic league appearances and goals ‡ National team caps and goals as of 12 April 2018

Marlene Beatriz Mendoza Bobadilla (born 5 April 1994) is a Paraguayan footballer who plays as a defender for Cerro Porteño. She has also played for the Paraguay women's national team.

== International career ==
Mendoza played for Paraguay at senior level in the 2018 Copa América Femenina.
