= Bárbara Muñoz (footballer) =

Chilean footballer (born 1992)

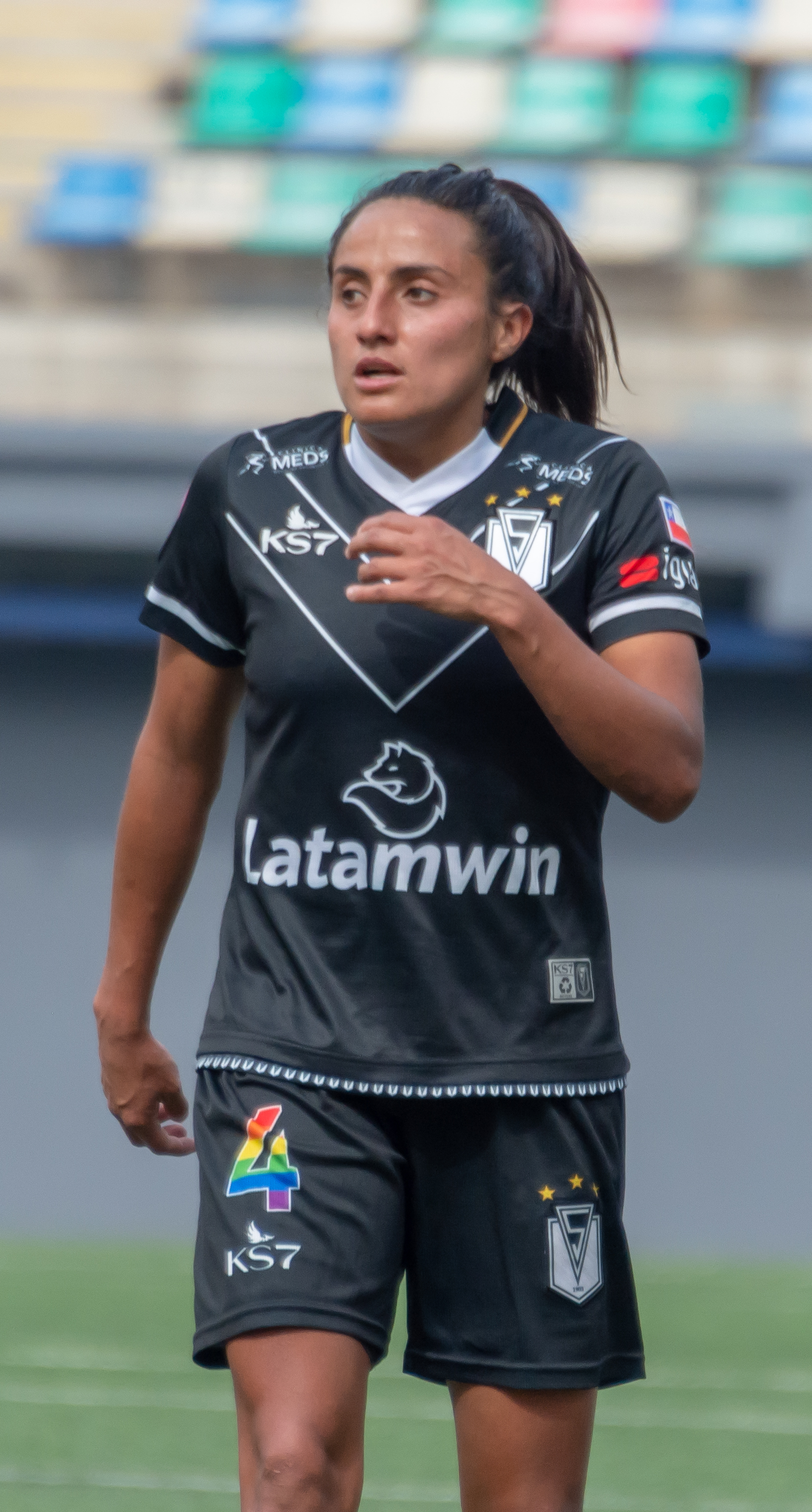
- Muñoz with Santiago Morning in 2023

Personal information
- Full name: Bárbara Alejandra Muñoz Bustamante
- Date of birth: 2 January 1992 (age 34)
- Place of birth: Maipú, Santiago, Chile
- Position: Defender

Team information
- Current team: Universidad Católica

Youth career
- CD Huracán
- Audax Italiano

Senior career*
Years	Team	Apps	(Gls)
2009–2016	Audax Italiano		
2017–2019	Colo-Colo		
2020–2024	Santiago Morning		
2025	Unión Española	26	(4)
2026–	Universidad Católica		

International career^{‡}
2014–2020	Chile	12	(0)
Medal record
Women's football
Representing Chile
South American Games
Silver medal – second place	2014 Santiago	Team
- * Club domestic league appearances and goals ‡ National team caps and goals as of 15 September 2017

Bárbara Alejandra Muñoz Bustamante (born 2 January 1992) is a Chilean footballer who plays as a defender for Universidad Católica.

== Club career ==
Muñoz spent five seasons with Santiago Morning from 2020 to 2024.

On 25 December 2025, Muñoz joined Universidad Católica from Unión Española.

== International career ==
Muñoz played for the senior team of Chile at the 2014 South American Games and the 2014 Copa América Femenina.

== Honours ==
Chile

- South American Games Silver medal: 2014
