= Pierina Montenegro =

Uruguayan footballer (born 1986)

Personal information
- Full name: Pierina Alejandra Montenegro Ventura
- Date of birth: 12 August 1986 (age 40)
- Place of birth: Uruguay
- Height: 1.70 m (5 ft 7 in)
- Position: Defender

Team information
- Current team: Canelones–Fénix

Senior career*
Years	Team	Apps	(Gls)
2015–2017	Canelones–Fénix	38	(18)
2018	Nacional	12	(1)
2019–	Canelones–Fénix	14	(3)

International career^{‡}
2018–	Uruguay	4	(0)
- * Club domestic league appearances and goals ‡ National team caps and goals as of 14 May 2025

Pierina Alejandra Montenegro Ventura (born 12 August 1986) is a Uruguayan footballer who plays as a defender for Canelones–Fénix and the Uruguay women's national team.

== International career ==
Montenegro capped for Uruguay during the 2018 Copa América Femenina.
