= Milagros Díaz =

Argentine footballer (born 2000)

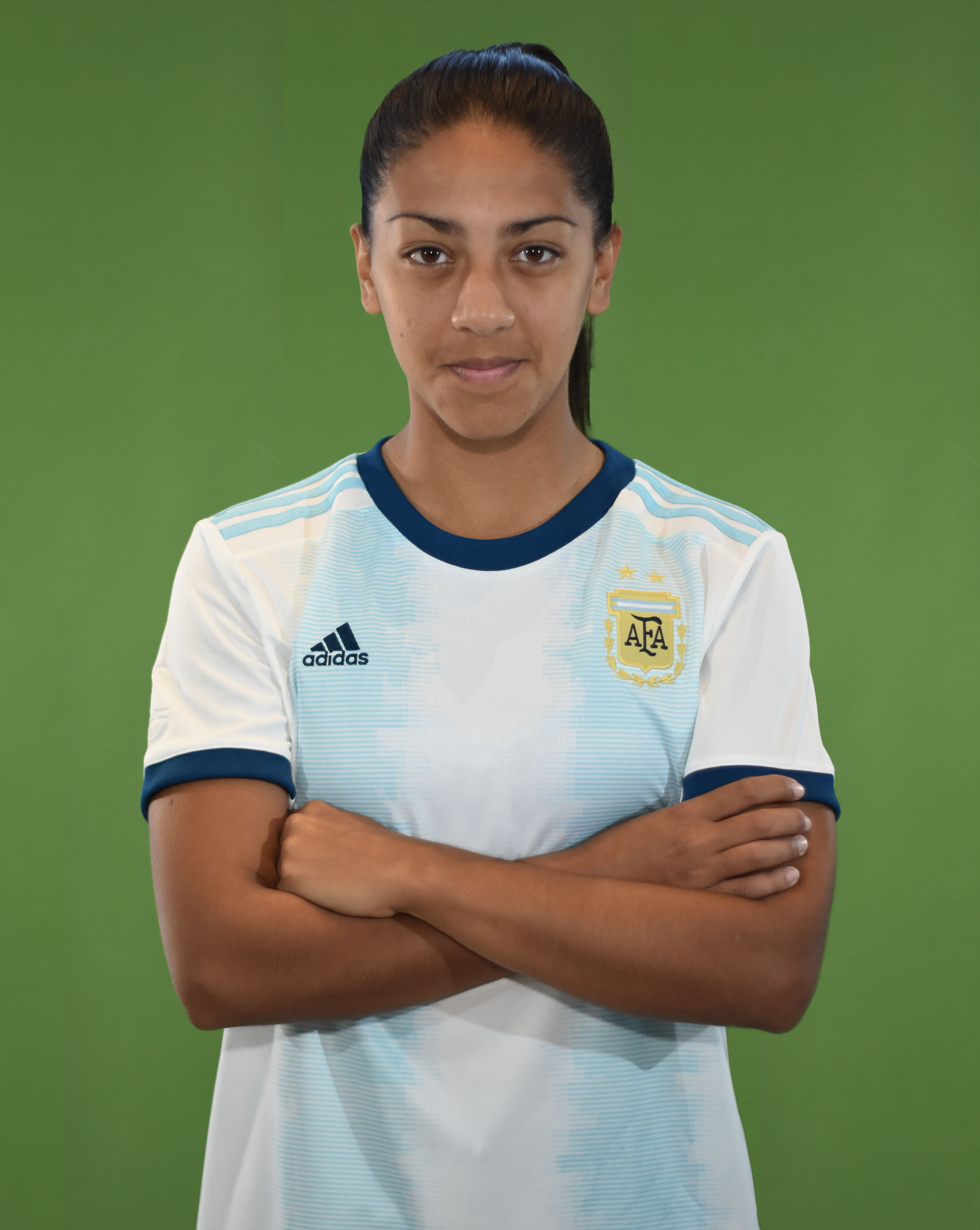
- Díaz before the U20 South American tournament in 2020

Personal information
- Full name: Milagros Naiquén Díaz
- Date of birth: 12 April 2000 (age 26)
- Position: Midfielder

Team information
- Current team: Gimnasia y Esgrima (LP)

Senior career*
| Years | Team | Apps | (Gls) |
| 2016–2018 | Villa San Carlos | | |
| 2018– | Gimnasia y Esgrima (LP) | | |

International career^{‡}
| 2017– | Argentina U20 | | |
| 2019– | Argentina | 1 | (0) |
- * Club domestic league appearances and goals ‡ National team caps and goals as of 1 September 2019

Milagros Naiquén Díaz (born 12 April 2000) is an Argentine footballer who plays as a midfielder for River Plate and the Argentina women's national team.

== International career ==
On 1 September 2019, Díaz appeared in a match against Costa Rica, which finished as a 1–3 loss. She was the captain of the national team during the U20 South American tournament in 2020.

== National career ==
She played as a midfielder in Gimnasia y Esgrima de La Plata between 2018 and 2022. She played 75 games and scored 32 goals.
