= Geraldine Leyton =

Chilean footballer (born 1989)

Personal information
- Full name: Geraldine Francisca Leyton López
- Date of birth: 11 May 1989 (age 37)
- Place of birth: Santiago, Chile
- Height: 1.55 m (5 ft 1 in)
- Position: Left back

Team information
- Current team: Santiago Morning

Senior career*
Years	Team	Apps	(Gls)
2007	Santiago Morning		
2008–2012	Colo-Colo		
2013–2015	Santiago Morning		
2013	→ Boca Juniors (loan)		
2015–2018	Colo-Colo		
2018	Sporting Huelva	10	(0)
2019–	Santiago Morning		

International career^{‡}
2008	Chile U20	3	(0)
2006–	Chile	16	(0)
- * Club domestic league appearances and goals as of 9 December 2018 ‡ National team caps and goals as of 13 November 2020

Geraldine Francisca Leyton López (born 11 May 1989) is a Chilean footballer who plays as a left back for Santiago Morning and the Chile women's national team.

== International career ==
Leyton represented Chile at the 2008 FIFA U-20 Women's World Cup.

== Honours ==
=== Club ===
Colo-Colo

- Chilean women's football championship (8): 2010, 2011 Apertura, 2011 Clausura, 2012 Apertura, 2012 Clausura, 2016 Clausura, 2017 Apertura, 2017 Clausura
