= Diana Alfaro =

Peruvian footballer (born 2001)

Personal information
- Full name: Diana Isabel Alfaro Guadalupe
- Date of birth: 25 August 2001 (age 25)
- Place of birth: Callao, Peru
- Height: 1.67 m (5 ft 6 in)
- Position: Defender

Team information
- Current team: Sporting Cristal

Senior career*
Years	Team	Apps	(Gls)
- Sporting Cristal

International career^{‡}
2017	Peru U20		
2017–	Peru	1	(0)
- * Club domestic league appearances and goals ‡ National team caps and goals as of 28 May 2017

Diana Isabel Alfaro Guadalupe (born 25 August 2001) is a Peruvian footballer who plays as a defender for Sporting Cristal and the Peru women's national team.

== International career ==
Alfaro represented Peru at the 2017 Bolivarian Games. At senior level, she played in a 0–12 friendly loss to Chile on 28 May 2017. She was about to be part of the squad for the 2018 Copa América Femenina, but got injured shortly before the start of the tournament and was replaced by Carmen Suárez.
