= Rilany =

Brazilian footballer (born 1986)

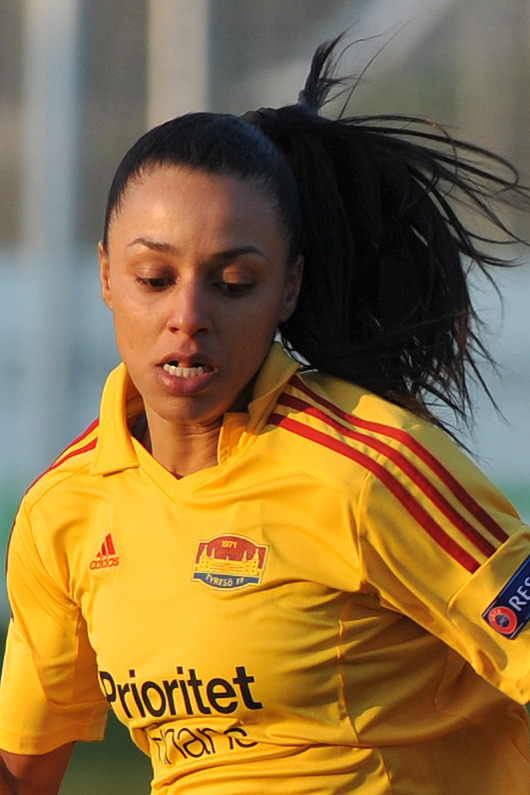
- Playing for Tyresö FF in 2014

Personal information
- Full name: Rilany Aguiar da Silva
- Date of birth: 26 June 1986 (age 40)
- Place of birth: Jacareí, Brazil
- Height: 1.63 m (5 ft 4 in)
- Position: Right back

Senior career*
Years	Team	Apps	(Gls)
2008–2009	Santos		
2010	Botucatu		
2011–2012	Foz Cataratas		
2013	Ferroviária		
2014	Tyresö FF	6	(0)
2014	Ferroviária		
2015	Santos		
2016	Iranduba		
2017–2018	Grindavík	27	(3)
2018	Atlético Madrid	0	(0)
2018–2019	Benfica	2	(1)

International career^{‡}
2013–2018	Brazil	10	(0)
- * Club domestic league appearances and goals as of 26 January 2019 ‡ National team caps and goals as of 24 June 2019

Rilany Aguiar da Silva (born 26 June 1986), known simply as Rilany, is a Brazilian former professional footballer who played as a defender for the Brazil women's national team and clubs in Brazil, Sweden, Iceland, Spain, and Portugal.

== Club career ==
Rilany transferred from Ferroviária to Tyresö in January 2014, as one of four Brazilians to join the Swedish club.

Rilany was an unused substitute in Tyresö's 4–3 defeat by Wolfsburg in the 2014 UEFA Women's Champions League Final. Tyresö became insolvent in 2014 and were kicked out of the 2014 Damallsvenskan season, expunging all their results and making all their players free agents. The Stockholm County Administrative Board published the players' salaries, showing Rilany was a middle-range earner at SEK 37 170 per-month.

Despite interest from other foreign clubs she was happy to agree a return to Ferroviária in July 2014. Following spells with Grindavík and Atlético Madrid, Rilany signed for Benfica in December 2018. She had signed with Atlético in July 2018, but her contract was cancelled in October 2018 without her playing for the team.

== International career ==
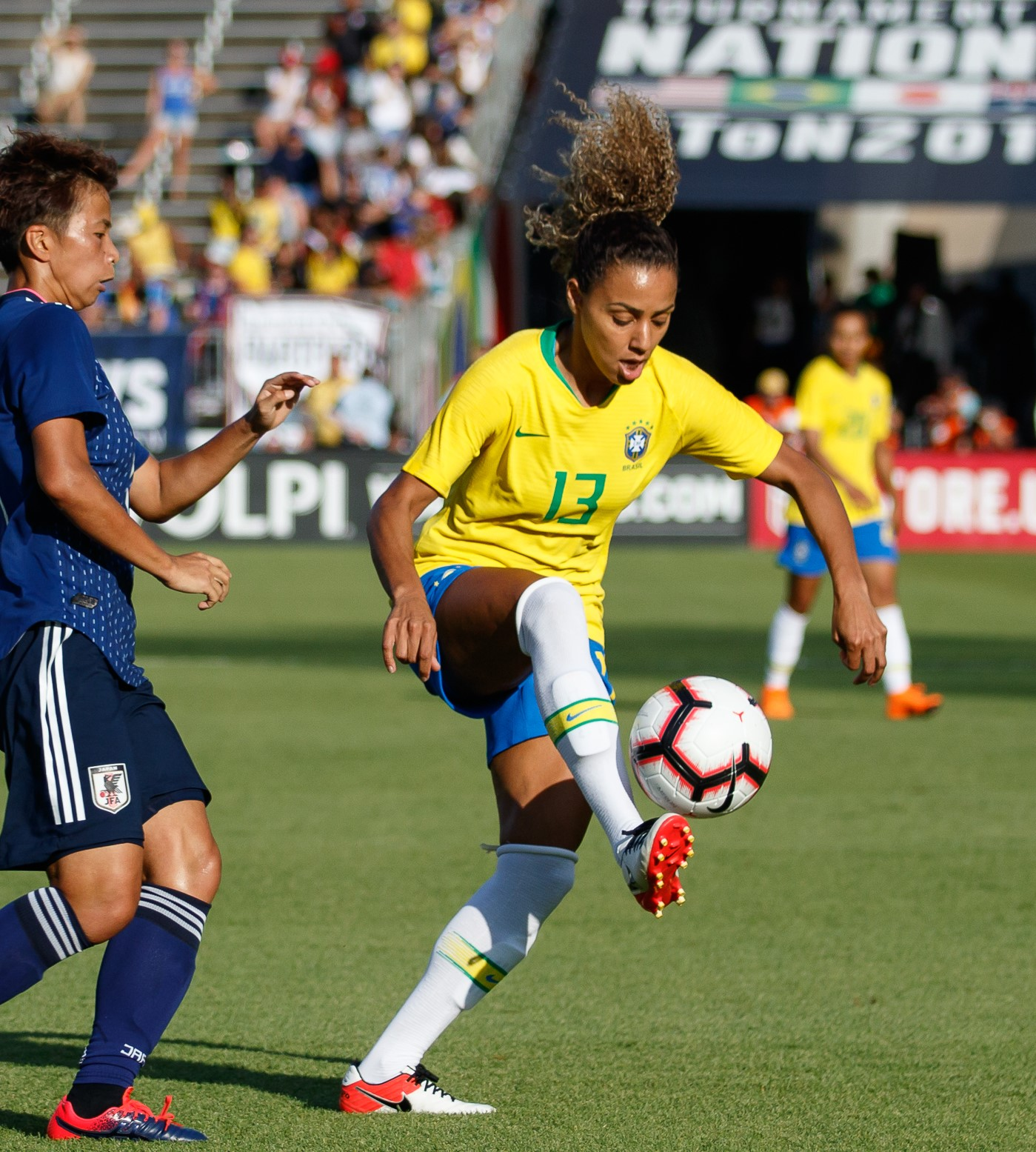
Rilany playing for Brazil in 2018

Rilany's senior debut for Brazil came in November 2013; in a 4–1 defeat by the United States at Florida Citrus Bowl Stadium.

== Honours ==
Benfica

- Campeonato Nacional II Divisão Feminino: 2018–19
- Taça de Portugal: 2018–19

International

- Copa América Femenina: 2018
