= Rocío Soto =

Chilean footballer (born 1993)

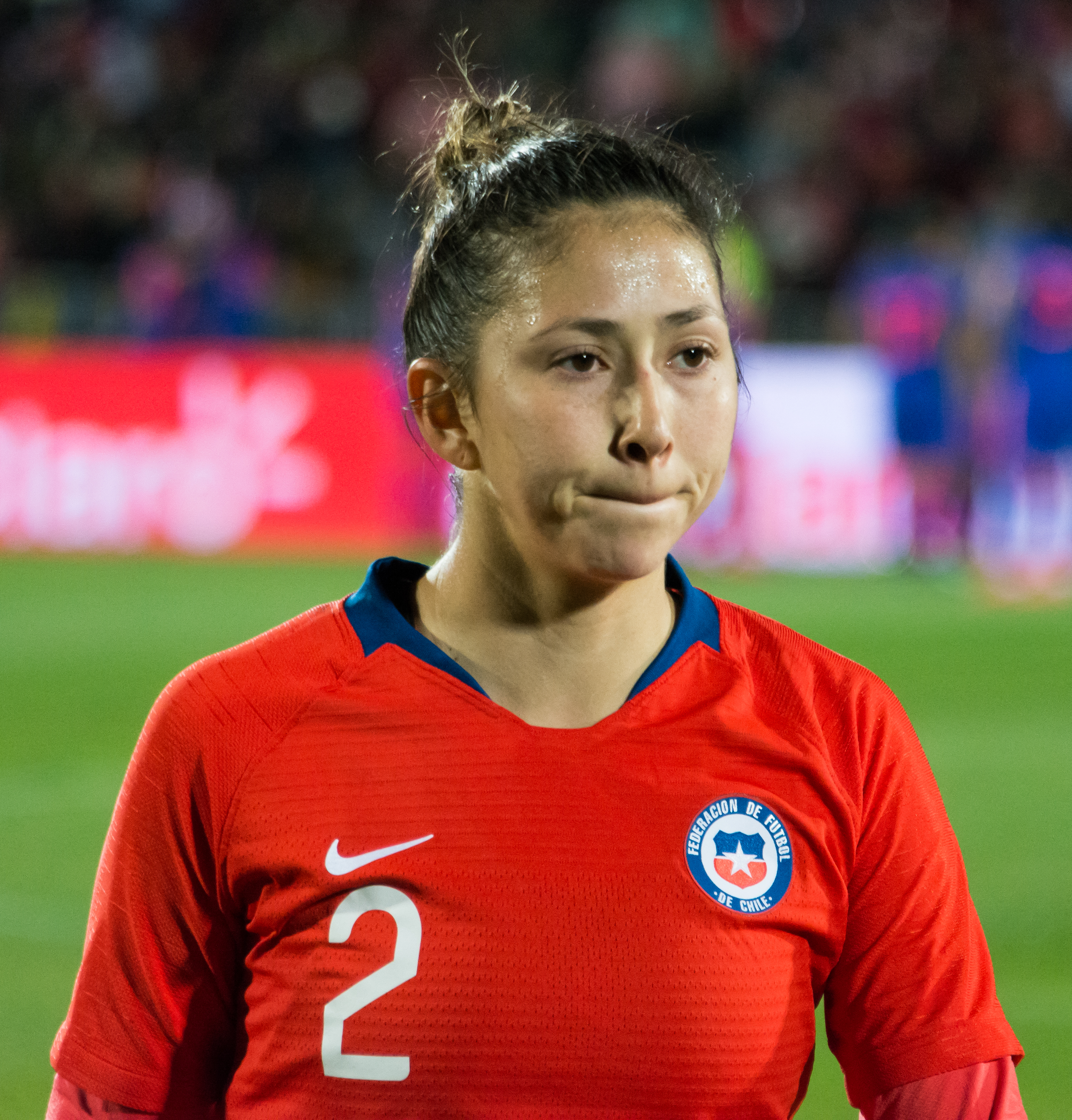
- Soto with Chile in 2019

Personal information
- Full name: Rocío Andrea Soto Collao
- Date of birth: 21 September 1993 (age 33)
- Place of birth: San Bernardo, Santiago, Chile
- Height: 1.63 m (5 ft 4 in)
- Position: Defender

Team information
- Current team: Santiago Morning

Senior career*
Years	Team	Apps	(Gls)
2010–2018	Colo-Colo		
2018	Zaragoza CFF		
2019	Colo-Colo		
2020–	Santiago Morning		

International career^{‡}
2010	Chile U17	1	(0)
2011–	Chile	33	(1)
Medal record
Women's football
Representing Chile
South American Games
Silver medal – second place	2014 Santiago	Team
- * Club domestic league appearances and goals ‡ National team caps and goals as of 14:00, 13 June 2019 (UTC)

Rocío Andrea Soto Collao (born 21 September 1993) is a Chilean footballer who plays as a defender for Santiago Morning.

== Club career ==
Soto made her debut with Colo-Colo in 2010 and played for them in three different stints. At the end of the 2023 season, she left them, having taken part in all titles in the club history.

== International career ==
Soto represented Chile at the 2010 FIFA U-17 Women's World Cup. She also was a member of the Chile squad that won the silver medal at the 2014 South American Games.

== Honours ==
Chile

- South American Games Silver medal: 2014
