= Milagros Otazú =

Argentine footballer

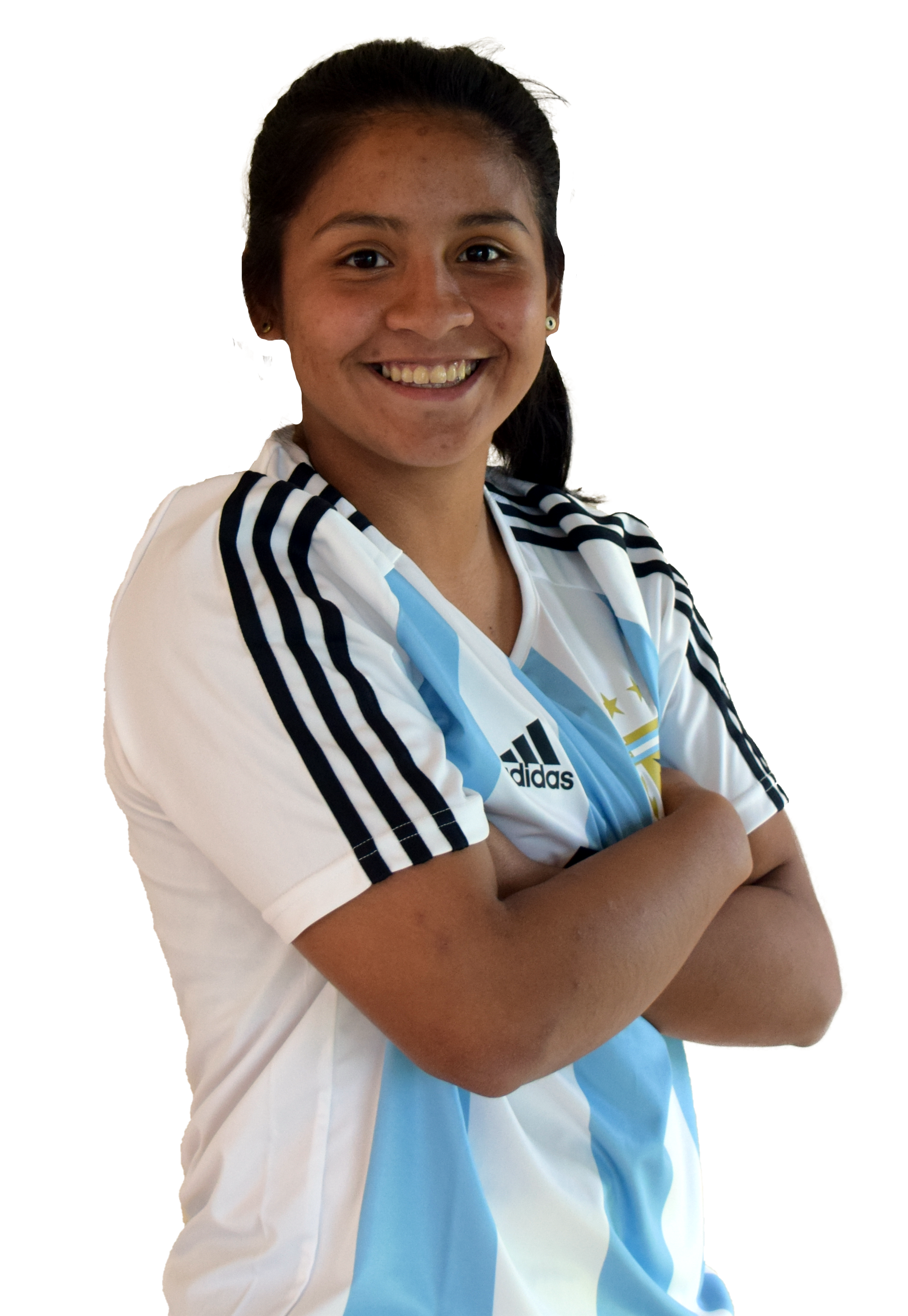

Personal information
- Full name: Milagros Ayelén Otazú
- Date of birth: 31 May 2001 (age 25)
- Place of birth: Posadas, Misiones, Argentina
- Height: 1.55 m (5 ft 1 in)
- Position: Left back

Team information
- Current team: UAI Urquiza

Senior career*
Years	Team	Apps	(Gls)
2016–	UAI Urquiza		

International career^{‡}
2018–	Argentina	2	(0)
- * Club domestic league appearances and goals ‡ National team caps and goals as of 3 March 2019

Milagros Ayelén Otazú (born 31 May 2001) is an Argentine footballer who plays as a left back for UAI Urquiza and the Argentina women's national team.

== International career ==
Otazú made her senior debut for Argentina during the 2018 Copa América Femenina on 10 April that year in a 6–3 victory over Ecuador.
