= 2022 Copa América Femenina Group A =

The 2022 Copa América Femenina Group A was the first of two sets in the group stage of the 2022 Copa América Femenina that took place from 8 July 2022 to 20 July 2022. The group competition consisted of Bolivia, Chile, hosts Colombia, Ecuador, and Paraguay. The top two teams automatically qualified for the top four knockout stage, while third place moved on to a fifth place match against the third-place finisher of Group B. In the knockout stage and fifth place match, the top three qualified to the 2023 FIFA Women's World Cup, fourth and fifth place continued to the 2023 FIFA Women's World Cup repêchage, and sixth place was eliminated.

== Teams ==
Draw position	Team	Pot	Finals appearance	Previous best performance	FIFA Rankings
A1	Colombia	1	7th	Runners-up (2010, 2014)	28
A2	Chile	2	9th	Runners-up (1991, 2018)	38
A3	Paraguay	3	7th	Fourth place (2006)	50
A4	Ecuador	4	8th	Third place (2014)	68
A5	Bolivia	5	8th	Fifth place (1995)	91

== Standings ==
Pos	Team	Pld	W	D	L	GF	GA	GD	Pts	Qualification
1	Colombia (H)	4	4	0	0	13	3	+10	12	Advance to semi-finals
2	Paraguay	4	3	0	1	9	7	+2	9	Advance to semi-finals
3	Chile	4	2	0	2	9	8	+1	6	Advance to fifth place match
4	Ecuador	4	1	0	3	9	7	+2	3	
5	Bolivia	4	0	0	4	1	16	−15	0	

Source: CONMEBOL
Rules for classification: Group stage tiebreakers
(H) Hosts

== Matches ==
=== Bolivia vs Ecuador ===
8 July 2022
16:00

Bolivia	1–6	Ecuador
É. Salvatierra 59'	Report (FIFA); Report (CONMEBOL)	Bolaños 19', 90+4'; Pesántez 37'; Aguirre 41'; Lattanzio 70'; Espinales 76'

Estadio Pascual Guerrero, Cali
Attendance: 7,000
Referee: Anahí Fernández (Uruguay)

Bolivia	Ecuador

GK	1	Kimberly López	(red card) 52'
DF	13	Ericka Morales
DF	2	Yuditza Salvatierra		(substituted off) 46'
DF	6	María Alejandra Vaquero (c)
DF	14	Ariani Melgar		(substituted off) 46'
MF	18	Yoselín Basualdo		(substituted off) 54'
MF	8	Paola Guzmán		(substituted off) 46'
MF	16	Samantha Alurralde
MF	5	Érika Salvatierra
MF	7	Ana Paula Rojas
FW	9	Marlene Flores		(substituted off) 46'
Substitutes:
GK	12	Daniela Salguero
GK	23	Alba Salazar		(substituted on) 54'
DF	4	Jhylian Mamani		(substituted on) 46'
DF	15	Aidé Mendiola		(substituted on) 46'
MF	22	Brandy Flores
FW	3	Olga Sandoval
FW	11	Ilsen Rodríguez
FW	19	Majhely Romero
FW	20	Alizia Bejarano		(substituted on) 46'
FW	21	Marilin Rojas		(substituted on) 46'
Manager:
(Argentina) Rosana Gómez

GK	12	Andrea Morán		(substituted off) 81'
DF	19	Kerlly Real
DF	5	Erika Gracia
DF	16	Ligia Moreira (c)	(yellow card) 58'	(substituted off) 64'
DF	14	Danna Pesántez
MF	4	Stefany Cedeño
MF	8	Marthina Aguirre		(substituted off) 46'
MF	10	Karen Flores
MF	11	Ámbar Torres		(substituted off) 65'
MF	21	Giannina Lattanzio		(substituted off) 74'
FW	9	Nayely Bolaños
Substitutes:
GK	1	Andrea Vera		(substituted on) 81'
GK	22	Ivanna Macías
DF	2	Suany Fajardo		(substituted on) 64'
DF	3	Ariana Lomas
MF	6	Manoly Baquerizo
MF	17	Joselyn Espinales		(substituted on) 74'
MF	18	Belén Aragón		(substituted on) 46'
FW	7	Emily Arias
FW	13	Nicole Charcopa	(yellow card) 80'	(substituted on) 65'
FW	15	Isabel Trujillo
FW	20	Jimena Zambrano
FW	23	Jael Montalvo
Manager:
(Portugal) Emily Lima

Player of the match:
Nayely Bolaños (Ecuador)

Assistant referees:
Luciana Mascaraña (Uruguay)
Adela Sánchez (Uruguay)
Fourth official:
Yercinia Correa (Venezuela)

=== Colombia vs Paraguay ===
8 July 2022
19:00

Colombia	4–2	Paraguay
Montoya 22', 59'; Ramírez 33'; Vanegas 82'	Report (FIFA); Report (CONMEBOL)	J. Martínez 27'; Gauto 90'

Estadio Pascual Guerrero, Cali
Attendance: 15,000
Referee: Edina Alves Batista (Brazil)

Colombia	Paraguay

GK	1	Catalina Pérez	(yellow card) 88'
DF	20	Mónica Ramos
DF	3	Daniela Arias
DF	19	Jorelyn Carabalí
DF	2	Manuela Vanegas
MF	6	Daniela Montoya (c)		(substituted off) 78'
MF	5	Lorena Bedoya	(yellow card) 38'
MF	18	Linda Caicedo		(substituted off) 70'
MF	11	Catalina Usme		(substituted off) 87'
MF	10	Leicy Santos
FW	9	Mayra Ramírez		(substituted off) 87'
Substitutes:
GK	12	Sandra Sepúlveda
GK	13	Natalia Giraldo
DF	14	Ángela Barón
DF	22	Daniela Caracas
MF	4	Diana Ospina	(yellow card) 90+5'	(substituted on) 70'
MF	8	Angie Castañeda
FW	7	Gisela Robledo		(substituted on) 78'
FW	15	Tatiana Ariza		(substituted on) 87'
FW	23	Elexa Bahr		(substituted on) 87'
Manager:
Nelson Abadía

GK	12	Alicia Bobadilla
DF	2	Limpia Fretes
DF	21	María Martínez		(substituted off) 66'
DF	5	Verónica Riveros (c)
DF	4	Daysy Bareiro
MF	9	Lice Chamorro		(substituted off) 62'
MF	6	Dulce Quintana
MF	15	Fanny Godoy
MF	18	Camila Arrieta		(substituted off) 56'
MF	10	Jessica Martínez	(yellow card) 29'
FW	19	Rebeca Fernández		(substituted off) 63'
Substitutes:
GK	1	Cristina Recalde
GK	22	Gloria Saleb
DF	3	Lorena Alonso
MF	7	Fabiola Sandoval		(substituted on) 56'
MF	8	Rosa Miño
MF	11	Fany Gauto		(substituted on) 62'
MF	16	Ramona Martínez		(substituted on) 66'
MF	20	Lourdes González		(substituted on) 63'
MF	23	Fátima Acosta
FW	13	Graciela Martínez
Manager:
(Italy) Marcello Frigério

Player of the match:
Daniela Montoya (Colombia)

Assistant referees:
Neuza Back (Brazil)
Mariana de Almeida (Argentina)
Fourth official:
Elizabeth Tintaya (Peru)

=== Paraguay vs Chile ===
11 July 2022
16:00

Paraguay	3–2	Chile
Fernández 3'; J. Martínez 12'; Sandoval 56'	Report (FIFA); Report (CONMEBOL)	Pardo 34'; Acuña 90+2'

Estadio Pascual Guerrero, Cali
Attendance: 1,500
Referee: Yercinia Correa (Venezuela)

Paraguay	Chile

GK	12	Alicia Bobadilla
DF	2	Limpia Fretes
DF	21	María Martínez
DF	5	Verónica Riveros (c)
DF	18	Camila Arrieta
MF	16	Ramona Martínez	(yellow card) 24'	(substituted off) 82'
MF	6	Dulce Quintana
MF	15	Fanny Godoy	(yellow card) 45+2'	(substituted off) 65'
MF	7	Fabiola Sandoval
FW	19	Rebeca Fernández		(substituted off) 64'
FW	10	Jessica Martínez	(yellow card) 30'
Substitutes:
GK	1	Cristina Recalde
GK	22	Gloria Saleb
DF	3	Lorena Alonso
DF	4	Daysy Bareiro
MF	8	Rosa Miño		(substituted on) 65'
MF	9	Lice Chamorro		(substituted on) 64'
MF	11	Fany Gauto		(substituted on) 82'
MF	23	Fátima Acosta
FW	13	Graciela Martínez
Manager:
(Italy) Marcello Frigério

GK	1	Christiane Endler (c)
DF	16	Geraldine Leyton		(substituted off) 65'
DF	14	Daniela Pardo	(yellow card) 41'
DF	18	Camila Sáez
DF	17	Javiera Toro
MF	6	Nayadet López		(substituted off) 46'
MF	15	Daniela Zamora
MF	8	Karen Araya		(substituted off) 46'
MF	4	Francisca Lara
MF	10	Yanara Aedo		(substituted off) 72'
FW	9	María José Urrutia		(substituted off) 46'
Substitutes:
GK	12	Natalia Campos
GK	23	Antonia Canales
DF	3	Carla Guerrero		(substituted on) 46'
MF	20	Yastin Jiménez		(substituted on) 72'
FW	2	Valentina Navarrete		(substituted on) 46'
FW	7	Yenny Acuña		(substituted on) 65'
FW	13	Javiera Grez		(substituted on) 46'
FW	22	Mary Valencia
Manager:
José Letelier

Player of the match:
Jessica Martínez (Paraguay)

Assistant referees:
Thaity Dugarte (Venezuela)
Thyty Rodríguez (Peru)
Fourth official:
Anahí Fernández (Uruguay)

=== Bolivia vs Colombia ===
11 July 2022
19:00

Bolivia	0–3	Colombia
	Report (FIFA); Report (CONMEBOL)	Santos 21'; Morales 70' (o.g.); D. Arias 78'

Estadio Pascual Guerrero, Cali
Attendance: 16,667
Referee: Elizabeth Tintaya (Peru)

Bolivia	Colombia

GK	23	Alba Salazar
DF	18	Yoselín Basualdo
DF	2	Yuditza Salvatierra	(substituted off) 68'
DF	13	Ericka Morales
DF	15	Aidé Mendiola	(substituted off) 90+1'
DF	3	Olga Sandoval	(substituted off) 90+1'
MF	7	Ana Paula Rojas
MF	16	Samantha Alurralde
MF	5	Érika Salvatierra (c)
MF	22	Brandy Flores	(substituted off) 65'
FW	21	Marilin Rojas	(substituted off) 90+1'
Substitutes:
GK	12	Daniela Salguero
DF	4	Jhylian Mamani	(substituted on) 90+1'
DF	14	Ariani Melgar	(substituted on) 68'
MF	8	Paola Guzmán
FW	11	Ilsen Rodríguez	(substituted on) 90+1'
FW	19	Majhely Romero	(substituted on) 65'
FW	20	Alizia Bejarano	(substituted on) 90+1'
Manager:
(Argentina) Rosana Gómez

GK	1	Catalina Pérez
DF	20	Mónica Ramos
DF	3	Daniela Arias
DF	19	Jorelyn Carabalí
DF	2	Manuela Vanegas
MF	6	Daniela Montoya (c)
MF	5	Lorena Bedoya	(yellow card) 54'	(substituted off) 58'
MF	4	Diana Ospina	(yellow card) 88'	(substituted off) 90+1'
MF	10	Leicy Santos		(substituted off) 90+7'
MF	18	Linda Caicedo		(substituted off) 90+7'
FW	11	Catalina Usme		(substituted off) 90'
Substitutes:
GK	12	Sandra Sepúlveda
GK	13	Natalia Giraldo
DF	14	Ángela Barón
DF	17	Carolina Arias		(substituted on) 90+1'
DF	22	Daniela Caracas
MF	8	Angie Castañeda		(substituted on) 90+7'
FW	7	Gisela Robledo		(substituted on) 90'
FW	9	Mayra Ramírez		(substituted on) 58'
FW	15	Tatiana Ariza
FW	23	Elexa Bahr		(substituted on) 90+7'
Manager:
Nelson Abadía

Player of the match:
Leicy Santos (Colombia)

Assistant referees:
Gabriela Moreno (Peru)
Vera Yupanqui (Peru)
Fourth official:
Edina Alves Batista (Brazil)

=== Paraguay vs Bolivia ===
14 July 2022
16:00

Paraguay	2–0	Bolivia
R. Martínez 10'; Fernández 71'	Report (FIFA); Report (CONMEBOL)

Estadio Pascual Guerrero, Cali
Attendance: 500
Referee: Anahí Fernández (Uruguay)

Paraguay	Bolivia

GK	12	Alicia Bobadilla	(yellow card) 50'
DF	2	Limpia Fretes
DF	21	María Martínez
DF	5	Verónica Riveros (c)
DF	4	Daysy Bareiro
MF	16	Ramona Martínez		(substituted off) 75'
MF	11	Fany Gauto		(substituted off) 82'
MF	15	Fanny Godoy		(substituted off) 75'
MF	7	Fabiola Sandoval		(substituted off) 46'
FW	19	Rebeca Fernández		(substituted off) 82'
FW	9	Lice Chamorro
Substitutes:
GK	1	Cristina Recalde
GK	22	Gloria Saleb
DF	3	Lorena Alonso
DF	6	Dulce Quintana		(substituted on) 75'
MF	8	Rosa Miño		(substituted on) 82'
MF	18	Camila Arrieta		(substituted on) 75'
MF	23	Fátima Acosta		(substituted on) 46'
FW	13	Graciela Martínez
FW	17	Gloria Villamayor	(yellow card) 88'	(substituted on) 82'
Manager:
(Italy) Marcello Frigério

GK	23	Alba Salazar
DF	18	Yoselín Basualdo
DF	2	Yuditza Salvatierra		(substituted off) 23'
DF	13	Ericka Morales
DF	15	Aidé Mendiola	(yellow card) 34'
DF	3	Olga Sandoval
MF	7	Ana Paula Rojas
MF	22	Brandy Flores		(substituted off) 46'
MF	5	Érika Salvatierra (c)
FW	9	Marlene Flores		(substituted off) 80'
FW	21	Marilin Rojas
Substitutes:
GK	1	Kimberly López
GK	12	Daniela Salguero
DF	4	Jhylian Mamani
DF	14	Ariani Melgar
MF	8	Paola Guzmán	(yellow card) 60'	(substituted on) 46'
MF	16	Samantha Alurralde
FW	11	Ilsen Rodríguez		(substituted on) 23'
FW	19	Majhely Romero
FW	20	Alizia Bejarano		(substituted on) 80'
Manager:
(Argentina) Rosana Gómez

Player of the match:
Ramona Martínez (Paraguay)

Assistant referees:
Luciana Mascaraña (Uruguay)
Adela Sánchez (Uruguay)
Fourth official:
Elizabeth Tintaya (Peru)

=== Chile vs Ecuador ===
14 July 2022
19:00

Chile	2–1	Ecuador
Sáez 40'; Acuña 76'	Report (FIFA); Report (CONMEBOL)	Aguirre 78'

Estadio Pascual Guerrero, Cali
Attendance: 1,500
Referee: Edina Alves Batista (Brazil)

Chile	Ecuador

GK	1	Christiane Endler (c)
DF	21	Rosario Balmaceda
DF	3	Carla Guerrero	(yellow card) 83'	(substituted off) 83'
DF	14	Daniela Pardo		(substituted off) 54'
DF	18	Camila Sáez
MF	11	Yessenia López
MF	8	Karen Araya	(yellow card) 18'
MF	4	Francisca Lara
FW	15	Daniela Zamora
FW	13	Javiera Grez		(substituted off) 83'
FW	2	Valentina Navarrete		(substituted off) 72'
Substitutes:
GK	12	Natalia Campos
GK	23	Antonia Canales
DF	5	Fernanda Ramírez
DF	16	Geraldine Leyton
DF	17	Javiera Toro		(substituted on) 83'
MF	6	Nayadet López		(substituted on) 54'
MF	10	Yanara Aedo
MF	20	Yastin Jiménez		(substituted on) 83'
FW	7	Yenny Acuña		(substituted on) 72'
FW	9	María José Urrutia
FW	22	Mary Valencia
Manager:
José Letelier

GK	12	Andrea Morán
DF	19	Kerlly Real
DF	2	Suany Fajardo		(substituted off) 77'
DF	16	Ligia Moreira (c)	(yellow card) 32'
DF	5	Erika Gracia
DF	14	Danna Pesántez
MF	13	Nicole Charcopa		(substituted off) 90+5'
MF	17	Joselyn Espinales		(substituted off) 46'
MF	11	Ámbar Torres		(substituted off) 77'
MF	10	Karen Flores		(substituted off) 90+1'
FW	9	Nayely Bolaños
Substitutes:
GK	1	Andrea Vera
GK	22	Ivanna Macías
DF	3	Ariana Lomas
MF	4	Stefany Cedeño	(yellow card) 66'	(substituted on) 46'
MF	6	Manoly Baquerizo
MF	8	Marthina Aguirre		(substituted on) 77'
MF	18	Belén Aragón
MF	21	Giannina Lattanzio
FW	7	Emily Arias		(substituted on) 77'
FW	15	Isabel Trujillo		(substituted on) 90+1'
FW	20	Jimena Zambrano		(substituted on) 90+5'
FW	23	Jael Montalvo
Manager:
(Portugal) Emily Lima

Player of the match:
Javiera Grez (Chile)

Assistant referees:
Neuza Back (Brazil)
Mariana de Almeida (Argentina)
Fourth official:
Laura Fortunato (Argentina)

=== Chile vs Bolivia ===
17 July 2022
16:00

Chile	5–0	Bolivia
Lara 7', 45+1'; É. Salvatierra 14' (o.g.); Y. López 17'; Valencia 76'	Report (FIFA); Report (CONMEBOL)

Estadio Pascual Guerrero, Cali
Attendance: 800
Referee: Elizabeth Tintaya (Peru)

Chile	Bolivia

GK	1	Christiane Endler (c)
DF	21	Rosario Balmaceda
DF	6	Nayadet López		(substituted off) 72'
DF	18	Camila Sáez
DF	17	Javiera Toro	(yellow card) 78'
MF	11	Yessenia López		(substituted off) 61'
MF	8	Karen Araya
MF	4	Francisca Lara		(substituted off) 60'
FW	15	Daniela Zamora		(substituted off) 46'
FW	13	Javiera Grez		(substituted off) 46'
FW	2	Valentina Navarrete
Substitutes:
GK	12	Natalia Campos
GK	23	Antonia Canales
DF	3	Carla Guerrero
DF	5	Fernanda Ramírez		(substituted on) 60'
DF	14	Daniela Pardo
DF	16	Geraldine Leyton
MF	10	Yanara Aedo
MF	20	Yastin Jiménez		(substituted on) 61'
FW	9	María José Urrutia		(substituted on) 72'
FW	19	María José Rojas		(substituted on) 46'
FW	22	Mary Valencia		(substituted on) 46'
Manager:
José Letelier

GK	1	Kimberly López
DF	18	Yoselín Basualdo
DF	15	Aidé Mendiola	(yellow card) 90+1'
DF	13	Ericka Morales
DF	3	Olga Sandoval		(substituted off) 46'
MF	7	Ana Paula Rojas
MF	16	Samantha Alurralde
MF	5	Érika Salvatierra (c)
MF	22	Brandy Flores
FW	9	Marlene Flores		(substituted off) 81'
FW	21	Marilin Rojas
Substitutes:
GK	23	Alba Salazar
DF	2	Yuditza Salvatierra
DF	4	Jhylian Mamani
DF	14	Ariani Melgar
MF	8	Paola Guzmán
FW	11	Ilsen Rodríguez		(substituted on) 46'
FW	19	Majhely Romero
FW	20	Alizia Bejarano		(substituted on) 81'
Manager:
(Argentina) Rosana Gómez

Player of the match:
Francisca Lara (Chile)

Assistant referees:
Gabriela Moreno (Peru)
Vera Yupanqui (Peru)
Fourth official:
Yercinia Correa (Venezuela)

=== Ecuador vs Colombia ===
17 July 2022
19:00

Ecuador	1–2	Colombia
Charcopa 34'	Report (FIFA); Report (CONMEBOL)	Ramírez 30'; Caicedo 45'

Estadio Pascual Guerrero, Cali
Attendance: 24,580
Referee: Laura Fortunato (Argentina)

Ecuador	Colombia

GK	12	Andrea Morán
DF	19	Kerlly Real	(yellow card) 40'
DF	2	Suany Fajardo
DF	5	Erika Gracia (c)
DF	14	Danna Pesántez
MF	11	Ámbar Torres		(substituted off) 59'
MF	4	Stefany Cedeño
MF	8	Marthina Aguirre		(substituted off) 85'
FW	13	Nicole Charcopa		(substituted off) 69'
FW	9	Nayely Bolaños	(yellow card) 45+2'
FW	10	Karen Flores		(substituted off) 69'
Substitutes:
GK	1	Andrea Vera
GK	22	Ivanna Macías
DF	3	Ariana Lomas
MF	6	Manoly Baquerizo		(substituted on) 69'
MF	17	Joselyn Espinales		(substituted on) 85'
MF	18	Belén Aragón
MF	21	Giannina Lattanzio	(yellow card) 68'	(substituted on) 59'
FW	7	Emily Arias		(substituted on) 69'
FW	15	Isabel Trujillo
FW	20	Jimena Zambrano
FW	23	Jael Montalvo
Manager:
(Portugal) Emily Lima

GK	1	Catalina Pérez
DF	20	Mónica Ramos
DF	3	Daniela Arias
DF	19	Jorelyn Carabalí
DF	2	Manuela Vanegas
MF	6	Daniela Montoya (c)	(yellow card) 37'
MF	21	Liana Salazar		(substituted off) 87'
MF	10	Leicy Santos
MF	11	Catalina Usme
MF	18	Linda Caicedo
FW	9	Mayra Ramírez	(yellow card) 53'	(substituted off) 87'
Substitutes:
GK	12	Sandra Sepúlveda
GK	13	Natalia Giraldo
DF	14	Ángela Barón
DF	22	Daniela Caracas		(substituted on) 87'
MF	8	Angie Castañeda
MF	16	Gabriela Rodríguez		(substituted on) 87'
FW	7	Gisela Robledo
FW	15	Tatiana Ariza
FW	23	Elexa Bahr
Manager:
Nelson Abadía

Player of the match:
Linda Caicedo (Colombia)

Assistant referees:
Daiana Milone (Argentina)
Leila Moreira (Brazil)
Fourth official:
Anahí Fernández (Uruguay)

=== Colombia vs Chile ===
20 July 2022
19:00

Colombia	4–0	Chile
Usme 4'; D. Arias 11'; Vanegas 37'; Salazar 41'	Report (FIFA); Report (CONMEBOL)

Estadio Centenario, Armenia
Attendance: 18,064
Referee: Anahí Fernández (Uruguay)

Colombia	Chile

GK	1	Catalina Pérez
DF	20	Mónica Ramos	(yellow card) 67'	(substituted off) 83'
DF	3	Daniela Arias
DF	19	Jorelyn Carabalí
DF	2	Manuela Vanegas
MF	5	Lorena Bedoya
MF	21	Liana Salazar		(substituted off) 77'
MF	4	Diana Ospina		(substituted off) 65'
MF	10	Leicy Santos		(substituted off) 83'
MF	18	Linda Caicedo		(substituted off) 83'
FW	11	Catalina Usme (c)
Substitutes:
GK	12	Sandra Sepúlveda
GK	13	Natalia Giraldo
DF	14	Ángela Barón
DF	22	Daniela Caracas		(substituted on) 83'
MF	6	Daniela Montoya
MF	8	Angie Castañeda
MF	16	Gabriela Rodríguez		(substituted on) 83'
FW	7	Gisela Robledo		(substituted on) 65'
FW	9	Mayra Ramírez
FW	15	Tatiana Ariza		(substituted on) 83'
FW	23	Elexa Bahr		(substituted on) 77'
Manager:
Nelson Abadía

GK	1	Christiane Endler (c)
DF	21	Rosario Balmaceda
DF	3	Carla Guerrero
DF	6	Nayadet López		(substituted off) 46'
DF	18	Camila Sáez
MF	11	Yessenia López
MF	8	Karen Araya		(substituted off) 73'
MF	20	Yastin Jiménez		(substituted off) 46'
FW	15	Daniela Zamora
FW	13	Javiera Grez		(substituted off) 46'
FW	2	Valentina Navarrete		(substituted off) 46'
Substitutes:
GK	12	Natalia Campos
GK	23	Antonia Canales
DF	5	Fernanda Ramírez		(substituted on) 46'
DF	14	Daniela Pardo
DF	16	Geraldine Leyton
MF	10	Yanara Aedo		(substituted on) 73'
FW	7	Yenny Acuña	(yellow card) 56'	(substituted on) 46'
FW	9	María José Urrutia		(substituted on) 46'
FW	19	María José Rojas		(substituted on) 46'
FW	22	Mary Valencia
Manager:
José Letelier

Player of the match:
Catalina Usme (Colombia)

Assistant referees:
Luciana Mascaraña (Uruguay)
Adela Sánchez (Uruguay)
Fourth official:
Edina Alves Batista (Brazil)

=== Ecuador vs Paraguay ===
20 July 2022
19:00

Ecuador	1–2	Paraguay
Real 45+1'	Report (FIFA); Report (CONMEBOL)	J. Martínez 30'; Chamorro 90+1'

Estadio Pascual Guerrero, Cali
Attendance: 250
Referee: Yercinia Correa (Venezuela)

Ecuador	Paraguay

GK	12	Andrea Morán
DF	19	Kerlly Real
DF	5	Erika Gracia
DF	16	Ligia Moreira (c)	(yellow card) 51'
DF	14	Danna Pesántez		(substituted off) 87'
MF	8	Marthina Aguirre	(yellow card) 64'	(substituted off) 64'
MF	4	Stefany Cedeño
MF	11	Ámbar Torres		(substituted off) 37'
FW	13	Nicole Charcopa
FW	9	Nayely Bolaños
FW	10	Karen Flores		(substituted off) 64'
Substitutes:
GK	1	Andrea Vera
GK	22	Ivanna Macías
DF	2	Suany Fajardo
DF	3	Ariana Lomas
MF	6	Manoly Baquerizo		(substituted on) 64'
MF	17	Joselyn Espinales		(substituted on) 87'
MF	18	Belén Aragón
MF	21	Giannina Lattanzio		(substituted on) 37'
FW	7	Emily Arias	(yellow card) 67'	(substituted on) 64'
FW	15	Isabel Trujillo
FW	20	Jimena Zambrano
FW	23	Jael Montalvo
Manager:
(Portugal) Emily Lima

GK	12	Alicia Bobadilla
DF	2	Limpia Fretes
DF	21	María Martínez
DF	5	Verónica Riveros (c)
DF	18	Camila Arrieta
MF	16	Ramona Martínez
MF	6	Dulce Quintana
MF	15	Fanny Godoy
MF	7	Fabiola Sandoval		(substituted off) 74'
FW	19	Rebeca Fernández	(yellow card) 48'	(substituted off) 61'
FW	10	Jessica Martínez		(substituted off) 90+3'
Substitutes:
GK	1	Cristina Recalde
GK	22	Gloria Saleb
DF	3	Lorena Alonso		(substituted on) 90+3'
DF	4	Daysy Bareiro
MF	8	Rosa Miño
MF	9	Lice Chamorro		(substituted on) 61'
MF	11	Fany Gauto		(substituted on) 74'
MF	20	Lourdes González
MF	23	Fátima Acosta
FW	13	Graciela Martínez
FW	17	Gloria Villamayor
Manager:
(Italy) Marcello Frigério

Player of the match:
Kerlly Real (Ecuador)

Assistant referees:
Thaity Dugarte (Venezuela)
Thyty Rodríguez (Peru)
Fourth official:
Elizabeth Tintaya (Peru)

== Discipline ==
Fair play points will be used as tiebreakers in the group if the overall and head-to-head records of teams were tied. These are calculated based on yellow and red cards received in all group matches as follows:

- first yellow card: plus 1 point;
- indirect red card (second yellow card): plus 3 points;
- direct red card: plus 4 points;
- yellow card and direct red card: plus 5 points;

Team	Match 1				Match 2				Match 3				Match 4				Points
Team	Booked	(yellow card) (yellow-red card)	Sent off (straight red)	(yellow card) (red card)	Booked	(yellow card) (yellow-red card)	Sent off (straight red)	(yellow card) (red card)	Booked	(yellow card) (yellow-red card)	Sent off (straight red)	(yellow card) (red card)	Booked	(yellow card) (yellow-red card)	Sent off (straight red)	(yellow card) (red card)	Points
Colombia (H)	3				2				2				1				−8
Chile	1				2				1				1				−5
Paraguay	1				3				2				1				−7
Ecuador	2				2				3				3				−10
Bolivia			1						2				1				−7
