= 2022 Copa América Femenina knockout stage =

Knockout stage of the 2022 Copa América Femenina

The knockout stage of 2022 Copa América Femenina began on 24 July 2022 with the fifth place play-off and ended on 30 July 2022 with the final.

== Format ==
In the knockout phase, if the final was level at the end of 90 minutes of normal playing time, extra time would be played (two periods of 15 minutes each), where each team would be allowed to make an extra substitution. If still tied after extra time, the match would be decided by a penalty shoot-out to determine the winners. In the fifth-place play-off, semi-finals and third-place play-off no extra time would be played and the match would be decided by a direct penalty shootout.

== Qualified teams ==
The top two placed teams from each of the two groups qualified for the knockout stage.

Group	Winners	Runners-up
A	Colombia	Paraguay
B	Brazil	Argentina

== Bracket ==
Semi-finals
25 July – Bucaramanga
Colombia	1
Argentina	0
26 July – Bucaramanga
Brazil	2
Paraguay	0

Final
30 July – Bucaramanga
Colombia	0
Brazil	1

Fifth place match
24 July – Armenia
Chile (p)	1 (4)
Venezuela	1 (2)

Third place match
29 July – Armenia
Argentina	3
Paraguay	1

All times are local, COT (UTC−5).

== Fifth place play-off ==
The winners of the fifth place match advanced to the inter-confederation play-offs.

24 July 2022
19:00

Chile	1–1	Venezuela
Zamora 65'	Report (FIFA); Report (CONMEBOL)	Castellanos 90+2'
Penalties
Lara (penalty scored); Araya (penalty scored); Zamora (penalty scored); Balmaceda (penalty missed); Guerrero (penalty scored)	4–2	(penalty missed) Castellanos; (penalty missed) Moreno; (penalty scored) Altuve; (penalty scored) Viso

Estadio Centenario, Armenia
Attendance: 2,283
Referee: Edina Alves Batista (Brazil)

Chile	Venezuela

GK	1	Christiane Endler (c)
DF	21	Rosario Balmaceda	(yellow card) 62'
DF	5	Fernanda Ramírez		(substituted off) 87'
DF	18	Camila Sáez
DF	17	Javiera Toro	(yellow card) 24'
MF	11	Yessenia López
MF	8	Karen Araya
MF	4	Francisca Lara
FW	7	Yenny Acuña		(substituted off) 87'
FW	15	Daniela Zamora
FW	16	Geraldine Leyton		(substituted off) 80'
Substitutes:
GK	12	Natalia Campos
GK	23	Antonia Canales
DF	3	Carla Guerrero		(substituted on) 87'
DF	14	Daniela Pardo
MF	6	Nayadet López
MF	10	Yanara Aedo
MF	20	Yastin Jiménez		(substituted on) 87'
FW	9	María José Urrutia
FW	13	Javiera Grez		(substituted on) 80'
FW	19	María José Rojas
FW	22	Mary Valencia
Manager:
José Letelier

GK	13	Nayluisa Cáceres
DF	3	Nairelis Gutiérrez		(substituted off) 44'
DF	2	Verónica Herrera
DF	4	María Peraza	(yellow card) 58'
DF	6	Michelle Romero
MF	21	Bárbara Olivieri
MF	8	Sonia O'Neill		(substituted off) 46'
MF	17	Maikerlin Astudillo		(substituted off) 80'
FW	9	Deyna Castellanos (c)
FW	11	Oriana Altuve
FW	14	Raiderlin Carrasco	(yellow card) 29'	(substituted off) 35'
Substitutes:
GK	1	Yéssica Velásquez
GK	22	Andrea Fernanda Tovar
DF	12	Sabrina Araujo-Elorza
DF	23	Gabriela Angulo		(substituted on) 44'
MF	7	Paola Villamizar		(substituted on) 35'
MF	10	Kika Moreno		(substituted on) 46'
MF	15	Yusmery Ascanio
FW	18	Ysaura Viso		(substituted on) 80'
FW	19	Mariana Speckmaier
Manager:
(Italy) Pamela Conti

Player of the Match:
Daniela Zamora (Chile)

Assistant referees:
Neuza Back (Brazil)
Leila Moreira (Brazil)
Fourth official:
Elizabeth Tintaya (Peru)

== Semi-finals ==
The winners of the semi-finals qualified for the 2023 FIFA Women's World Cup and the football tournament at the 2024 Summer Olympics.

=== Colombia vs Argentina ===
25 July 2022
19:00

Colombia	1–0	Argentina
Caicedo 63'	Report (FIFA); Report (CONMEBOL)

Estadio Alfonso López, Bucaramanga
Attendance: 15,757
Referee: María Belén Carvajal (Chile)

Colombia	Argentina

GK	1	Catalina Pérez
DF	20	Mónica Ramos
DF	3	Daniela Arias
DF	19	Jorelyn Carabalí
DF	2	Manuela Vanegas	(yellow card) 50'
MF	6	Daniela Montoya (c)		(substituted off) 67'
MF	5	Lorena Bedoya
MF	10	Leicy Santos
MF	11	Catalina Usme
MF	18	Linda Caicedo	(yellow card) 90+3'	(substituted off) 90+5'
FW	9	Mayra Ramírez
Substitutes:
GK	12	Sandra Sepúlveda
GK	13	Natalia Giraldo
DF	14	Ángela Barón
DF	22	Daniela Caracas
MF	4	Diana Ospina		(substituted on) 90+5'
MF	8	Angie Castañeda
MF	16	Gabriela Rodríguez
MF	21	Liana Salazar		(substituted on) 67'
FW	7	Gisela Robledo
FW	15	Tatiana Ariza
FW	23	Elexa Bahr
Manager:
Nelson Abadía

GK	1	Vanina Correa (c)
DF	18	Gabriela Chávez	(yellow card) 23' (yellow-red card) 73'
DF	2	Agustina Barroso		(substituted off) 79'
DF	13	Sophia Braun
DF	3	Eliana Stábile	(yellow card) 45+2'	(substituted off) 79'
MF	7	Romina Núñez	(yellow card) 45+3'	(substituted off) 84'
MF	8	Daiana Falfán
MF	15	Florencia Bonsegundo		(substituted off) 89'
FW	11	Yamila Rodríguez
FW	19	Mariana Larroquette		(substituted off) 84'
FW	22	Estefanía Banini
Substitutes:
GK	12	Solana Pereyra
GK	23	Laurina Oliveros
DF	16	Marina Delgado		(substituted on) 84'
MF	4	Julieta Cruz		(substituted on) 79'
MF	5	Vanesa Santana
MF	10	Dalila Ippólito
MF	14	Miriam Mayorga		(substituted on) 79'
MF	17	Maricel Pereyra
MF	20	Ruth Bravo
FW	9	Sole Jaimes		(substituted on) 84'
FW	21	Érica Lonigro		(substituted on) 89'
Manager:
Germán Portanova

Player of the Match:
Linda Caicedo (Colombia)

Assistant referees:
Loreto Toloza (Chile)
Cindy Nahuelcoy (Chile)
Fourth official:
Susana Corella (Ecuador)

=== Brazil vs Paraguay ===
26 July 2022
19:00

Brazil	2–0	Paraguay
Ary Borges 16'; Bia Zaneratto 28'	Report (FIFA); Report (CONMEBOL)

Estadio Alfonso López, Bucaramanga
Attendance: 5,832
Referee: Anahí Fernández (Uruguay)

Brazil	Paraguay

GK	1	Lorena
DF	13	Antônia		(substituted off) 81'
DF	15	Tainara
DF	4	Rafaelle (c)		(substituted off) 71'
DF	6	Tamires
MF	21	Kerolin		(substituted off) 81'
MF	17	Ary Borges	(yellow card) 35'	(substituted off) 58'
MF	8	Angelina
MF	11	Adriana
FW	16	Bia Zaneratto
FW	9	Debinha		(substituted off) 71'
Substitutes:
GK	12	Natascha
GK	22	Luciana
DF	3	Kathellen		(substituted on) 71'
DF	20	Fe Palermo		(substituted on) 81'
MF	14	Duda Sampaio		(substituted on) 58'
MF	23	Luana
FW	7	Gabi Portilho		(substituted on) 81'
FW	10	Duda
FW	18	Geyse		(substituted on) 71'
FW	19	Gio Queiroz
Manager:
(Sweden) Pia Sundhage

GK	12	Alicia Bobadilla
DF	16	Ramona Martínez
DF	21	María Martínez	(yellow card) 45'
DF	5	Verónica Riveros (c)		(substituted off) 86'
DF	4	Daysy Bareiro		(substituted off) 90+1'
MF	10	Jessica Martínez
MF	15	Fanny Godoy		(substituted off) 86'
MF	6	Dulce Quintana
MF	7	Fabiola Sandoval
FW	19	Rebeca Fernández		(substituted off) 73'
FW	11	Fany Gauto
Substitutes:
GK	1	Cristina Recalde
GK	22	Gloria Saleb
DF	3	Lorena Alonso		(substituted on) 86'
MF	8	Rosa Miño		(substituted on) 86'
MF	23	Fátima Acosta		(substituted on) 73'
FW	13	Graciela Martínez		(substituted on) 90+1'
FW	17	Gloria Villamayor
Manager:
(Italy) Marcello Frigério

Player of the Match:
Bia Zaneratto (Brazil)

Assistant referees:
Luciana Mascaraña (Uruguay)
Adela Sánchez (Uruguay)
Fourth official:
Yercinia Correa (Venezuela)

== Third place play-off ==
The winners of the third place match qualified for the 2023 FIFA Women's World Cup. The losers advanced to the inter-confederation play-offs.

29 July 2022
19:00

Argentina	3–1	Paraguay
Rodríguez 78', 90+1'; Bonsegundo 90'	Report (FIFA); Report (CONMEBOL)	Núñez 39' (o.g.)

Estadio Centenario, Armenia
Attendance: 4,500
Referee: María Victoria Daza (Colombia)

Argentina	Paraguay

GK	1	Vanina Correa (c)
DF	4	Julieta Cruz		(substituted off) 46'
DF	13	Sophia Braun
MF	14	Miriam Mayorga
DF	3	Eliana Stábile	(yellow card) 60'	(substituted off) 64'
MF	7	Romina Núñez
MF	8	Daiana Falfán
MF	15	Florencia Bonsegundo	(yellow card) 23'
FW	11	Yamila Rodríguez	(yellow card) 75'
FW	9	Sole Jaimes		(substituted off) 86'
FW	22	Estefanía Banini
Substitutes:
GK	12	Solana Pereyra
GK	23	Laurina Oliveros
DF	16	Marina Delgado		(substituted on) 46'
MF	5	Vanesa Santana
MF	10	Dalila Ippólito		(substituted on) 64'
MF	17	Maricel Pereyra
MF	20	Ruth Bravo
FW	19	Mariana Larroquette
FW	21	Érica Lonigro		(substituted on) 86'
Manager:
Germán Portanova

GK	12	Alicia Bobadilla
DF	2	Limpia Fretes
DF	21	María Martínez
DF	5	Verónica Riveros (c)		(substituted off) 90+2'
DF	18	Camila Arrieta		(substituted off) 63'
MF	16	Ramona Martínez	(yellow card) 87'	(substituted off) 90+2'
MF	6	Dulce Quintana
MF	15	Fanny Godoy	(yellow card) 10'	(substituted off) 51'
MF	7	Fabiola Sandoval
FW	19	Rebeca Fernández		(substituted off) 62'
FW	10	Jessica Martínez	(yellow card) 90+5'
Substitutes:
GK	1	Cristina Recalde
GK	22	Gloria Saleb
DF	3	Lorena Alonso		(substituted on) 90+2'
DF	4	Daysy Bareiro		(substituted on) 63'
MF	8	Rosa Miño
MF	9	Lice Chamorro		(substituted on) 62'
MF	11	Fany Gauto		(substituted on) 51'
MF	20	Lourdes González		(substituted on) 90+2'
MF	23	Fátima Acosta
FW	13	Graciela Martínez
FW	17	Gloria Villamayor
Manager:
(Italy) Marcello Frigério

Player of the Match:
Yamila Rodríguez (Argentina)

Assistant referees:
Eliana Ortiz (Colombia)
Nataly Arteaga (Colombia)
Fourth official:
Sandra Braz (Portugal)

== Final ==
30 July 2022
19:00

Colombia	0–1	Brazil
	Report (FIFA); Report (CONMEBOL)	Debinha 39' (pen.)

Estadio Alfonso López, Bucaramanga
Attendance: 28,000
Referee: Laura Fortunato (Argentina)

Colombia	Brazil

GK	1	Catalina Pérez
RB	22	Daniela Caracas
CB	3	Daniela Arias
CB	19	Jorelyn Carabalí
LB	2	Manuela Vanegas
CM	6	Daniela Montoya (c)
CM	5	Lorena Bedoya	(yellow card) 52'	(substituted off) 85'
RW	18	Linda Caicedo
AM	10	Leicy Santos
LW	11	Catalina Usme
CF	9	Mayra Ramírez		(substituted off) 63'
Substitutes:
GK	12	Sandra Sepúlveda
GK	13	Natalia Giraldo
DF	14	Ángela Barón
DF	20	Mónica Ramos
MF	4	Diana Ospina		(substituted on) 63'
MF	8	Angie Castañeda
MF	16	Gabriela Rodríguez
MF	21	Liana Salazar
FW	7	Gisela Robledo		(substituted on) 85'
FW	15	Tatiana Ariza
FW	23	Elexa Bahr
Manager:
Nelson Abadía

GK	1	Lorena
CB	13	Antônia	(yellow card) 59'
CB	15	Tainara	(yellow card) 40'
CB	4	Rafaelle (c)
RWB	17	Ary Borges		(substituted off) 67'
LWB	6	Tamires
CM	11	Adriana
CM	8	Angelina		(substituted off) 8'
CM	9	Debinha
CF	21	Kerolin		(substituted off) 67'
CF	16	Bia Zaneratto	(yellow card) 55'	(substituted off) 87'
Substitutes:
GK	12	Natascha
GK	22	Luciana
DF	2	Letícia Santos
DF	3	Kathellen
DF	20	Fe Palermo
MF	5	Duda Santos
MF	14	Duda Sampaio
MF	23	Luana		(substituted on) 67'
FW	7	Gabi Portilho		(substituted on) 67'
FW	10	Duda		(substituted on) 8'
FW	18	Geyse		(substituted on) 87'
FW	19	Gio Queiroz
Manager:
(Sweden) Pia Sundhage

Player of the Match:
Linda Caicedo (Colombia)

Assistant referees:
Mariana de Almeida (Argentina)
Daiana Milone (Argentina)
Fourth official:
Adriana Farfán (Bolivia)
Video assistant referee:
Zulma Quiñónez (Paraguay)
Assistant video assistant referees:
Susana Corella (Ecuador)
Mónica Amboya (Ecuador)
