= Football at the 2023 Pan American Games – Women's team squads =

The women's football tournament at the 2023 Pan American Games was held in Chile from 22 October to 3 November 2023. The eight teams involved in the tournament were required to register a squad of 18 players, including two goalkeepers.

== Group A ==
=== Chile ===
Head coach: Luis Mena

The squad of 18 players was announced on 2 October 2023.

No.	Pos.	Player	Date of birth (age)	Caps	Goals	Club
1	GK	Christiane Endler (captain)	23 July 1991 (aged 32)	100	0	(French Football Federation) Lyon
2	DF	Michelle Olivares	4 April 2002 (aged 21)	3	1	(Football Federation of Chile) Colo-Colo
3	DF	Su Helen Galaz	27 May 1991 (aged 32)	23	0	(Football Federation of Chile) Santiago Morning
4	MF	Karen Fuentes	3 August 2004 (aged 19)	1	0	(Football Federation of Chile) Universidad de Chile
5	DF	Fernanda Ramírez	30 April 1992 (aged 31)	10	0	(Football Federation of Chile) Colo-Colo
6	MF	Yastin Jiménez	17 October 2000 (aged 23)	20	0	(Football Federation of Chile) Colo-Colo
7	FW	Yenny Acuña	18 May 1997 (aged 26)	25	5	(Brazilian Football Confederation) Bahia
8	MF	Karen Araya	16 October 1990 (aged 33)	56	7	(Royal Spanish Football Federation) Madrid CFF
9	FW	María José Urrutia	17 December 1993 (aged 29)	37	3	(Football Federation of Chile) Colo-Colo
10	MF	Yanara Aedo	5 August 1993 (aged 30)	54	8	(Football Federation of Chile) Colo-Colo
11	MF	Yessenia López	20 October 1990 (aged 33)	53	5	(Football Federation of Chile) Colo-Colo
12	GK	Antonia Canales	16 October 2002 (aged 21)	4	0	(Royal Spanish Football Federation) Valencia
13	MF	Anaís Álvarez	4 July 2007 (aged 16)	3	0	(Football Federation of Chile) Colo-Colo
14	FW	Franchesca Caniguán	15 November 1999 (aged 23)	1	0	(Football Federation of Chile) Universidad de Chile
15	FW	Daniela Zamora	13 November 1990 (aged 32)	47	5	(Football Federation of Chile) Universidad de Chile
16	FW	Isidora Olave	23 April 2002 (aged 21)	3	0	(Football Federation of Chile) Colo-Colo
17	DF	Fernanda Pinilla	6 November 1993 (aged 29)	18	0	(Football Federation of Chile) Universidad de Chile
18	DF	Camila Sáez	17 October 1994 (aged 29)	60	4	(Royal Spanish Football Federation) Madrid CFF

=== Jamaica ===
Head coach: Wendell Downswell

The following 18 players were named in the squad.

No.	Pos.	Player	Date of birth (age)	Caps	Goals	Club
1	GK	Sajane Anderson	15 April 2007 (aged 16)	0	0	(Jamaica Football Federation) Vere United
2	DF	Lotoya Duhaney	14 March 1994 (aged 29)	0	0	(Jamaica Football Federation) Frazier's Whip
3	DF	Monique Pryce	18 May 1991 (aged 32)	3	0	(Jamaica Football Federation) Olympic Gardens
4	FW	Kiana Tulloch	13 June 2005 (aged 18)	0	0	(Jamaica Football Federation) Frazier's Whip
5	DF	Janiel Mignott	13 May 2005 (aged 18)	0	0	(Jamaica Football Federation) Frazier's Whip
6	DF	Ashanti Lewis	13 February 2002 (aged 21)	0	0	(Jamaica Football Federation) Cavalier
7	MF	Kersha Thomas	20 April 2001 (aged 22)	2	0	(Jamaica Football Federation) Cavalier
8	MF	Elizabeth Miller	9 September 2009 (aged 14)	0	0	(Jamaica Football Federation) Royal Lakes
10	MF	Shaniel Buckley	20 May 2005 (aged 18)	3	1	(Jamaica Football Federation) Frazier's Whip
11	MF	Destiny Powell	10 April 2007 (aged 16)	3	0	(Jamaica Football Federation) Frazier's Whip
12	FW	Sashana Campbell	2 March 1991 (aged 32)	26	2	(Polish Football Association) Medyk Konin
13	GK	Chris-Ann Chambers (captain)	24 October 1995 (aged 27)	4	0	(Georgian Football Federation) Dinamo Sokhumi
14	DF	Akelia Johnson	13 January 2006 (aged 17)	0	0	(Jamaica Football Federation) Frazier's Whip
16	FW	Sheyenne Bonnick	3 February 1999 (aged 24)	2	0	(Jamaica Football Federation) Cavalier
17	MF	Tamara O'Sullivan	6 February 1997 (aged 26)	0	0	(Jamaica Football Federation) Cavalier
18	DF	Andrene Smith	26 October 2005 (aged 17)	1	0	(Jamaica Football Federation) Frazier's Whip
19	FW	Tatyana Polack	16 January 1999 (aged 24)	0	0	(Jamaica Football Federation) Cavalier
20	FW	Sundai Amelie	25 December 2006 (aged 16)	0	0	(The Football Association) London City Lionesses

=== Mexico ===
Head coach: Pedro López

The squad of 18 players was announced on 19 October 2023.

No.	Pos.	Player	Date of birth (age)	Caps	Goals	Club
1	GK	Esthefanny Barreras	2 November 1996 (aged 26)	3	0	(Mexican Football Federation) Pachuca
2	FW	Diana Ordóñez	26 September 2001 (aged 22)	11	6	(United States Soccer Federation) Houston Dash
3	DF	Karina Rodríguez	2 March 1999 (aged 24)	9	0	(Mexican Football Federation) América
4	DF	Rebeca Bernal	31 August 1997 (aged 26)	44	3	(Mexican Football Federation) Monterrey
5	DF	Anika Rodríguez	1 January 1997 (aged 26)	14	0	(Mexican Football Federation) UANL
6	DF	Nicolette Hernández	17 February 1999 (aged 24)	5	0	(Mexican Football Federation) América
7	MF	María Sánchez (captain)	20 February 1996 (aged 27)	44	9	(United States Soccer Federation) Houston Dash
8	MF	Alexia Delgado	9 December 1999 (aged 23)	29	2	(Mexican Football Federation) UANL
9	FW	Kiana Palacios	1 October 1996 (aged 27)	33	8	(Mexican Football Federation) América
10	FW	Charlyn Corral	11 September 1991 (aged 32)	66	34	(Mexican Football Federation) Pachuca
11	MF	Lizbeth Ovalle	19 October 1999 (aged 24)	39	11	(Mexican Football Federation) UANL
12	GK	Alejandría Godínez	24 February 1994 (aged 29)	3	0	(Mexican Football Federation) Monterrey
13	DF	Araceli Torres	23 December 2000 (aged 22)	1	0	(Mexican Football Federation) Guadalajara
14	DF	Greta Espinoza	5 June 1995 (aged 28)	40	5	(Mexican Football Federation) UANL
15	DF	Kimberly Rodríguez	26 March 1999 (aged 24)	13	1	(Mexican Football Federation) América
16	MF	Karla Nieto	9 January 1995 (aged 28)	36	0	(Mexican Football Federation) Pachuca
17	FW	Alicia Cervantes	24 January 1994 (aged 29)	18	8	(Mexican Football Federation) Guadalajara
18	MF	Scarlett Camberos	20 November 2000 (aged 22)	7	1	(United States Soccer Federation) Angel City

=== Paraguay ===
Head coach: Antônio Carlos Bona

The squad of 18 players was announced on 28 September 2023.

No.	Pos.	Player	Date of birth (age)	Caps	Goals	Club
1	GK	Cristina Recalde	29 March 1994 (aged 29)	9	0	(Royal Spanish Football Federation) Unión Viera
2	DF	Limpia Fretes	24 June 2000 (aged 23)	19	0	(Brazilian Football Confederation) Avaí
3	DF	Lorena Alonso	1 April 1998 (aged 25)	7	0	(Paraguayan Football Association) Olimpia
4	DF	Daysy Bareiro	19 January 2001 (aged 22)	10	0	(Royal Spanish Football Federation) Unión Viera
5	DF	Verónica Riveros (captain)	23 April 1987 (aged 36)	12	0	(Brazilian Football Confederation) Avaí
6	FW	María Segovia	7 July 2000 (aged 23)	0	0	(Paraguayan Football Association) Olimpia
7	MF	Fabiola Sandoval	27 May 1999 (aged 24)	20	2	(Brazilian Football Confederation) Internacional
8	DF	Deisy Ojeda	3 March 2000 (aged 23)	4	0	(Mexican Football Federation) Querétaro
9	FW	Rebeca Fernández	1 December 1991 (aged 31)	8	2	(Football Federation of Chile) Universidad de Chile
10	FW	Jessica Martínez	14 June 1999 (aged 24)	16	7	(Royal Spanish Football Federation) Levante Las Planas
11	MF	Fany Gauto	19 August 1992 (aged 31)	10	1	(Brazilian Football Confederation) Internacional
12	GK	Gloria Saleb	12 June 1991 (aged 32)	0	0	(Paraguayan Football Association) Olimpia
13	MF	Dahiana Bogarín	13 November 2000 (aged 22)	3	0	(Football Federation of Chile) Colo-Colo
14	FW	Camila Barbosa	18 February 2002 (aged 21)	0	0	(Paraguayan Football Association) Olimpia
15	MF	Fanny Godoy	21 January 1998 (aged 25)	20	0	(Royal Spanish Football Federation) Unión Viera
16	MF	Ramona Martínez	21 July 1996 (aged 27)	12	1	(Paraguayan Football Association) Libertad/Limpeño
17	DF	María Martínez	24 May 1999 (aged 24)	15	0	(Football Federation of Chile) Universidad de Chile
18	DF	Camila Arrieta	16 September 2001 (aged 22)	7	0	(Brazilian Football Confederation) Cruzeiro

== Group B ==
=== Argentina ===
Head coach: Germán Portanova

The squad of 18 players was announced on 28 September 2023.

No.	Pos.	Player	Date of birth (age)	Caps	Goals	Club
1	GK	Vanina Correa (captain)	14 August 1983 (aged 40)	61	0	(Argentine Football Association) Rosario Central
2	DF	Adriana Sachs	25 December 1993 (aged 29)	37	0	(Argentine Football Association) Racing Club
3	DF	Eliana Stábile	26 November 1993 (aged 29)	56	5	(Argentine Football Association) Boca Juniors
4	DF	Julieta Cruz	4 June 1996 (aged 27)	15	0	(Argentine Football Association) Boca Juniors
5	MF	Camila Gómez Ares	26 October 1994 (aged 28)	8	1	(Argentine Football Association) Boca Juniors
6	DF	Aldana Cometti	3 March 1996 (aged 27)	73	6	(Royal Spanish Football Federation) Madrid CFF
7	MF	Romina Núñez	1 January 1994 (aged 29)	30	1	(Argentine Football Association) UAI Urquiza
8	MF	Daiana Falfán	14 October 2000 (aged 23)	33	0	(Argentine Football Association) UAI Urquiza
9	FW	Paulina Gramaglia	21 March 2003 (aged 20)	10	0	(Brazilian Football Confederation) Red Bull Bragantino
10	MF	Maricel Pereyra	11 May 2002 (aged 21)	7	0	(Argentine Football Association) San Lorenzo
11	FW	Érica Lonigro	6 July 1994 (aged 29)	15	2	(Argentine Football Association) Rosario Central
12	GK	Laurina Oliveros	10 September 1993 (aged 30)	9	0	(Argentine Football Association) Boca Juniors
13	DF	Sophia Braun	26 January 2000 (aged 23)	15	2	(Mexican Football Federation) León
14	DF	Miriam Mayorga	20 November 1989 (aged 33)	43	0	(Argentine Football Association) Boca Juniors
15	MF	Milagros Martín	26 April 2007 (aged 16)	0	0	(Argentine Football Association) Platense
16	FW	Brisa Priori	3 May 2001 (aged 22)	0	0	(Argentine Football Association) Boca Juniors
17	MF	Agostina Holzheier	30 September 2003 (aged 20)	2	0	(Argentine Football Association) Racing Club
18	FW	Estefanía Palomar	7 January 2003 (aged 20)	0	0	(Argentine Football Association) Boca Juniors

=== Bolivia ===
Head coach: Rosana Gómez

The squad of 18 players was announced on 12 October 2023.

No.	Pos.	Player	Date of birth (age)	Caps	Goals	Club
1	GK	Alba Salazar	17 February 2005 (aged 18)	3	0	(Royal Spanish Football Federation) PM Friol
2	DF	Ericka Morales	17 December 1994 (aged 28)	7	0	(Bolivian Football Federation) Oriente Petrolero
3	DF	Aidé Mendiola	14 November 2000 (aged 22)	4	0	(Bolivian Football Federation) Oriente Petrolero
4	DF	Eyda Serrudo	4 October 2000 (aged 23)	0	0	(Bolivian Football Federation) Universidad
5	MF	Erika Salvatierra	5 March 1990 (aged 33)	4	1	(Royal Spanish Football Federation) PM Friol
6	MF	Yaneth Viveros (captain)	21 January 1993 (aged 30)	1	0	(Bolivian Football Federation) Oriente Petrolero
7	DF	Mariana Ayala	1 September 2004 (aged 19)	0	0	(Bolivian Football Federation) Exótico
9	FW	Carla Méndez	30 January 1997 (aged 26)	1	0	(Bolivian Football Federation) Oriente Petrolero
10	FW	Briseyda Orellana	1 June 2004 (aged 19)	0	0	(Bolivian Football Federation) Jorge Wilstermann
11	MF	Ana Huanca	20 October 1986 (aged 37)	4	0	(Bolivian Football Federation) Astor
12	GK	Vanessa Ojeda	29 March 2006 (aged 17)	0	0	(Bolivian Football Federation) Santa Cruz
13	FW	Ivana Siles	10 April 2001 (aged 22)	0	0	(United States Soccer Federation) Nebraska–Kearney Lopers
14	MF	Ana Paula Rojas	17 July 1997 (aged 26)	9	0	(Bolivian Football Federation) Always Ready
15	MF	Samantha Alurralde	4 January 2004 (aged 19)	3	0	(Bolivian Football Federation) The Strongest
16	DF	Lucerito Bravo	18 July 2005 (aged 18)	0	0	(Bolivian Football Federation) Blooming
17	FW	Luana San Miguel	11 May 2002 (aged 21)	0	0	(United States Soccer Federation) NOC Tonkawa Mavericks
18	MF	Abigaíl Quiroz	12 October 2001 (aged 22)	0	0	(Royal Spanish Football Federation) Oviedo
19	FW	Marlene Flores	23 April 2001 (aged 22)	3	0	(Bolivian Football Federation) Real Tomayapo

=== Costa Rica ===
Head coach: Benito Rubido Vidal

The squad of 18 players was announced on 11 October 2023. On 17 October, María Coto and Gloriana Villalobos withdrew due to injury, and were replaced by María Paula Porras and Carolina Venegas.

No.	Pos.	Player	Date of birth (age)	Caps	Goals	Club
1	GK	Génesis Pérez	4 May 2005 (aged 18)	0	0	(United States Soccer Federation) UCF Knights
2	DF	Gabriela Guillén (captain)	1 March 1992 (aged 31)	83	2	(Costa Rican Football Federation) Alajuelense
3	DF	María Paula Porras	18 March 2002 (aged 21)	6	1	(Costa Rican Football Federation) Sporting
4	DF	Mariana Benavides	26 December 1994 (aged 28)	92	2	(Costa Rican Football Federation) Saprissa
5	DF	Stephannie Blanco	13 December 2000 (aged 22)	11	1	(Costa Rican Football Federation) Alajuelense
6	MF	Emily Flores	19 November 2001 (aged 21)	3	0	(Costa Rican Football Federation) Sporting
7	FW	Alexa Herrera	16 November 2004 (aged 18)	3	1	(Costa Rican Football Federation) Alajuelense
8	MF	Mariela Campos	4 January 1991 (aged 32)	6	0	(Costa Rican Football Federation) Alajuelense
9	FW	Tanisha Fonseca	5 November 2007 (aged 15)	0	0	(Costa Rican Football Federation) Sporting
10	FW	Carolina Venegas	28 September 1991 (aged 32)	47	17	(Mexican Football Federation) Atlas
11	MF	Alexandra Pinell	18 October 2002 (aged 21)	7	0	(Costa Rican Football Federation) Alajuelense
12	DF	María Paula Elizondo	30 November 1998 (aged 24)	15	0	(Costa Rican Football Federation) Saprissa
13	MF	Emilie Valenciano	15 February 1997 (aged 26)	14	0	(Costa Rican Football Federation) Alajuelense
14	DF	Fabiola Villalobos	13 March 1998 (aged 25)	38	3	(Costa Rican Football Federation) Alajuelense
15	MF	Mariela Campos	7 October 1998 (aged 25)	6	0	(Costa Rican Football Federation) Saprissa
16	FW	Yoanka Villanueva	21 August 1996 (aged 27)	5	0	(Costa Rican Football Federation) Dimas Escazú
17	FW	Sheika Scott	22 October 2006 (aged 17)	6	0	(Costa Rican Football Federation) Alajuelense
18	GK	Priscilla Tapia	2 May 1991 (aged 32)	16	0	(Costa Rican Football Federation) Saprissa

=== United States U19 ===
Head coach: Carrie Kveton

The squad of 18 players was announced on 9 October 2023. On 12 October, Lizzie Boamah replaced Reese Klein due to injury.

No.	Pos.	Player	Date of birth (age)	Caps	Goals	Club
1	GK	Sonoma Kasica	30 June 2006 (aged 17)	0	0	(United States Soccer Federation) Florida Premier FC
2	DF	Gisele Thompson	2 December 2005 (aged 17)	4	1	(United States Soccer Federation) Total Futbol Academy
3	DF	Aven Alvarez	14 November 2006 (aged 16)	0	0	(United States Soccer Federation) North Carolina Courage
4	DF	Lizzie Boamah	19 April 2006 (aged 17)	0	0	(United States Soccer Federation) Albion San Diego
5	DF	Nicki Fraser	25 January 2006 (aged 17)	0	0	(United States Soccer Federation) Real Colorado
6	MF	Grace Restovich	15 August 2006 (aged 17)	0	0	(United States Soccer Federation) St. Louis Scott Gallagher
7	FW	Ava McDonald	7 September 2006 (aged 17)	0	0	(United States Soccer Federation) FC Dallas
8	MF	Charlotte Kohler	18 October 2005 (aged 18)	0	0	(United States Soccer Federation) MVLA SC
9	FW	Amalia Villarreal	27 March 2006 (aged 17)	0	0	(United States Soccer Federation) Michigan Jaguars FC
10	MF	Lauren Martinho	9 October 2005 (aged 18)	4	2	(United States Soccer Federation) North Carolina Courage
11	FW	Katie Shea Collins	28 October 2005 (aged 17)	0	0	(United States Soccer Federation) Tennessee SC
12	GK	Kealey Titmuss	15 September 2006 (aged 17)	0	0	(United States Soccer Federation) Nationals
13	DF	Sammy Smith	22 September 2005 (aged 18)	0	0	(United States Soccer Federation) Boise Timbers Thorns FC
14	MF	Claire Hutton (captain)	11 January 2006 (aged 17)	0	0	(United States Soccer Federation) World Class FC
15	MF	Kendall Bodak	21 March 2006 (aged 17)	0	0	(United States Soccer Federation) New England FC
16	FW	Emeri Adames	3 April 2006 (aged 17)	0	0	(United States Soccer Federation) Solar SC
17	MF	Eleanor Klinger	4 November 2006 (aged 16)	0	0	(United States Soccer Federation) Internationals SC
18	DF	Jordyn Bugg	11 August 2006 (aged 17)	0	0	(United States Soccer Federation) San Diego Surf SC
