= 2022 Copa América Femenina final =

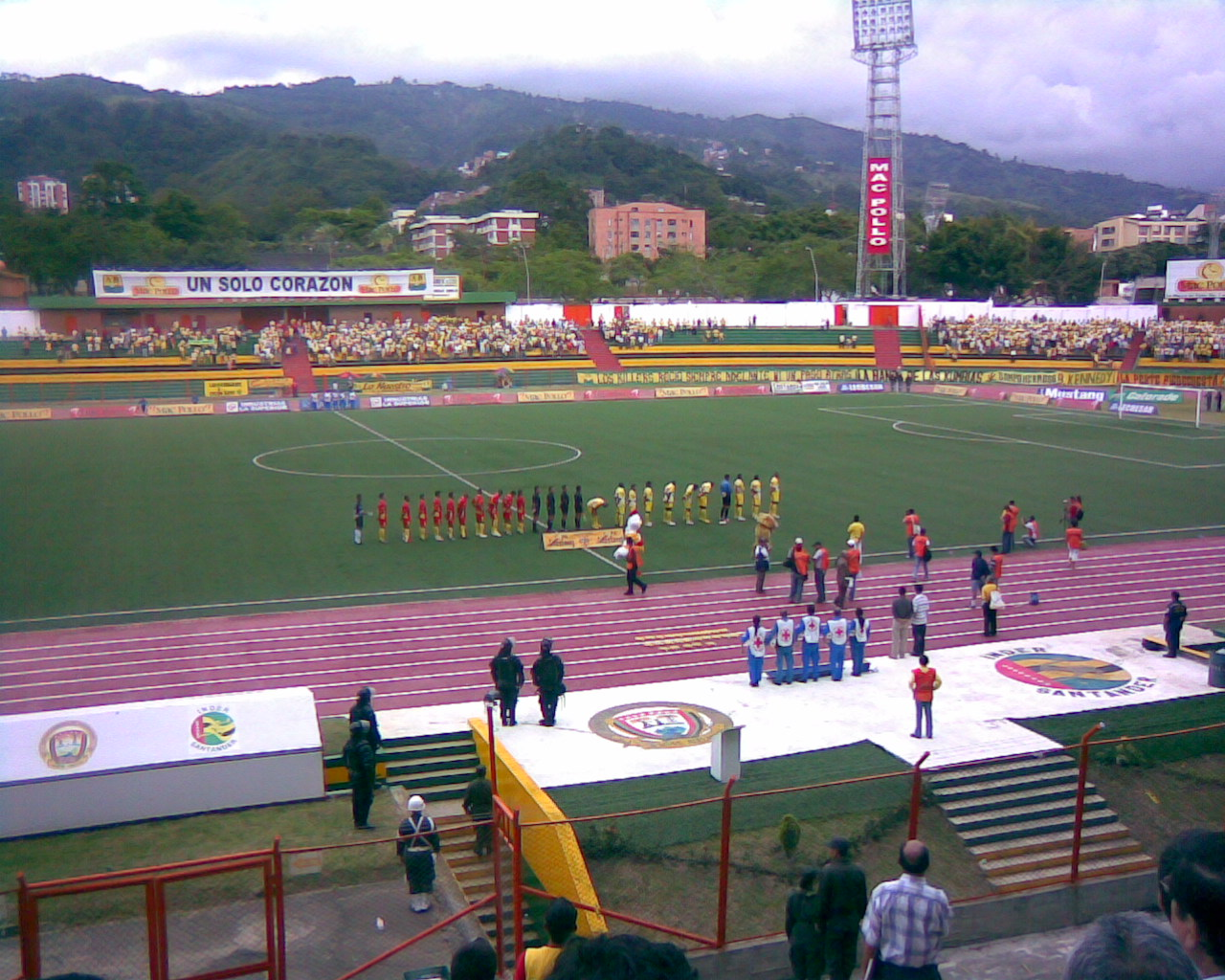
- Estadio Alfonso López hosted the final.
- Event: 2022 Copa América Femenina
| Colombia | Brazil |
| (Colombia) | (Brazil) |
| 0 | 1 |
- Date: 30 July 2022
- Venue: Estadio Alfonso López, Bucaramanga
- Player of the Match: Linda Caicedo (Colombia)
- Referee: Laura Fortunato (Argentina)
- Attendance: 28,000
- Weather: Cloudy; 23 °C (73 °F); 87% humidity

The 2022 Copa América Femenina final was a football match on 30 July 2022 that took place at Estadio Alfonso López in Bucaramanga, Colombia, to determine the winners of 2022 Copa América Femenina. The match took place between hosts Colombia and Brazil.

Brazil defeated 1–0 Colombia to win their 8th title. As winners, they competed in the inaugural 2023 Women's Finalissima against England, winners of UEFA Women's Euro 2022.

== Venue ==
The final match of the tournament was held in Estadio Alfonso López at the city of Bucaramanga. With the capacity of only 28,000, the stadium had never hosted any major football tournament, except being the home of Atlético Bucaramanga, a top division club of Colombia's Categoría Primera A. Despite its lack of importance and small size, the stadium was selected to host the final match of the competition. The choice stirred much controversies due to its inferior standard for the final of a continental tournament.

== Route to the final ==
Colombia
Round
Brazil
Opponents
Result
Group stage
Opponents
Result
Paraguay
4–2
Match 1
Argentina
4–0
Bolivia
3–0
Match 2
Uruguay
3–0
Ecuador
2–1
Match 3
Venezuela
4–0
Chile
4–0
Match 4
Peru
6–0
Group A winners

| Pos | Team | Pld | Pts |
|---|---|---|---|
| 1 | Colombia (H) | 4 | 12 |
| 2 | Paraguay | 4 | 9 |
| 3 | Chile | 4 | 6 |
| 4 | Ecuador | 4 | 3 |
| 5 | Bolivia | 4 | 0 |

Source: CONMEBOL
(H) Hosts
Final standings
Group B winners

| Pos | Team | Pld | Pts |
|---|---|---|---|
| 1 | Brazil | 4 | 12 |
| 2 | Argentina | 4 | 9 |
| 3 | Venezuela | 4 | 6 |
| 4 | Uruguay | 4 | 3 |
| 5 | Peru | 4 | 0 |

Source: CONMEBOL
Opponents
Result
Knockout stage
Opponents
Result
Argentina
1–0
Semi-finals
Paraguay
2–0

=== Colombia ===
As the host of the tournament, Colombia was effectively drawn into the Group A, sharing with Ecuador, Chile, Paraguay and Bolivia. The Colombians made their group stage (played in Estadio Olímpico Pascual Guerrero, Cali) route smoothly at the beginning by beating Paraguay 4–2, before easily surpassed a weaker Bolivian side 3–0. The Colombians then faced a sterner Ecuadorian side, and only managed to snatch the win thanked to Linda Caicedo, all came at the first half as it finished 2–1. Colombia finally demolished Chile 4–0, guaranteeing the first place of the group and kicking Chile out of the knockout stage. In the semi-finals, Colombia had a hard time against Argentina, only snatching a 1–0 win thanks to Linda Caicedo again to book a place in the final and qualified for the 2023 FIFA Women's World Cup, as Colombia aimed to win its first ever trophy after finishing second twice.

=== Brazil ===
The most decorated team in the tournament, having won it seven times, including the recent 2018 edition, Brazil was drawn in Group B with the other South American champions Argentina, as well as Peru, Uruguay and Venezuela, Brazil proved too powerful for the group stage; the Brazilians easily dispatched Argentina 4–0 in the first match, before settled another easy 3–0 win over Uruguay. With Brazil not playing in Matchday 3, the team returned to action in Matchday 4 against Venezuela, as the Brazilians again proved its domination with a 4–0 win. With the top of the table assured, Brazil obliterated a weak Peru side 6–0 to conquer the group undefeated and conceding no goal. In the semi-finals, Brazil had a more difficult game against a stern Paraguay, but managed to win 2–0 nonetheless, to match to the final with a perfect winning record and conceding none, as well as qualified for the 2023 FIFA Women's World Cup.

== Match ==
Carolina Arias (Colombia) was suspended by CONMEBOL due to violation of health protocols and was excluded from the final.

=== Details ===
30 July 2022
19:00 COT

| Colombia | 0–1 | Brazil |
|---|---|---|
| | Report (FIFA); Report (CONMEBOL) | Debinha 39' (pen.) |

Estadio Alfonso López, Bucaramanga
Attendance: 28,000
Referee: Laura Fortunato (Argentina)

| Colombia | Brazil |

| GK | 1 | Catalina Pérez |
| RB | 22 | Daniela Caracas |
| CB | 3 | Daniela Arias |
| CB | 19 | Jorelyn Carabalí |
| LB | 2 | Manuela Vanegas |
| CM | 6 | Daniela Montoya (c) |
| CM | 5 | Lorena Bedoya | (yellow card) 52' | (substituted off) 85' |
| RW | 18 | Linda Caicedo |
| AM | 10 | Leicy Santos |
| LW | 11 | Catalina Usme |
| CF | 9 | Mayra Ramírez | | (substituted off) 63' |
Substitutes:
| GK | 12 | Sandra Sepúlveda |
| GK | 13 | Natalia Giraldo |
| DF | 14 | Ángela Barón |
| DF | 20 | Mónica Ramos |
| MF | 4 | Diana Ospina | | (substituted on) 63' |
| MF | 8 | Angie Castañeda |
| MF | 16 | Gabriela Rodríguez |
| MF | 21 | Liana Salazar |
| FW | 7 | Gisela Robledo | | (substituted on) 85' |
| FW | 15 | Tatiana Ariza |
| FW | 23 | Elexa Bahr |
Manager:
Nelson Abadía

| GK | 1 | Lorena |
| CB | 13 | Antônia | (yellow card) 59' |
| CB | 15 | Tainara | (yellow card) 40' |
| CB | 4 | Rafaelle (c) |
| RWB | 17 | Ary Borges | | (substituted off) 67' |
| LWB | 6 | Tamires |
| CM | 11 | Adriana |
| CM | 8 | Angelina | | (substituted off) 8' |
| CM | 9 | Debinha |
| CF | 21 | Kerolin | | (substituted off) 67' |
| CF | 16 | Bia Zaneratto | (yellow card) 55' | (substituted off) 87' |
Substitutes:
| GK | 12 | Natascha |
| GK | 22 | Luciana |
| DF | 2 | Letícia Santos |
| DF | 3 | Kathellen |
| DF | 20 | Fe Palermo |
| MF | 5 | Duda Santos |
| MF | 14 | Duda Sampaio |
| MF | 23 | Luana | | (substituted on) 67' |
| FW | 7 | Gabi Portilho | | (substituted on) 67' |
| FW | 10 | Duda | | (substituted on) 8' |
| FW | 18 | Geyse | | (substituted on) 87' |
| FW | 19 | Gio Queiroz |
Manager:
(Sweden) Pia Sundhage

Player of the Match:
Linda Caicedo (Colombia)

Assistant referees:
Mariana de Almeida (Argentina)
Daiana Milone (Argentina)
Fourth official:
Adriana Farfán (Bolivia)
Video assistant referee:
Zulma Quiñónez (Paraguay)
Assistant video assistant referees:
Susana Corella (Ecuador)
Mónica Amboya (Ecuador)

Match rules

- 90 minutes
- 30 minutes of extra time if necessary
- Penalty shoot-out if scores still level
- Maximum of twelve named substitutes
- Maximum of five substitutions, with a sixth allowed in extra time (Note: Each team was given only three opportunities to make substitutions, with a fourth opportunity in extra time, excluding substitutions made at half-time, before the start of extra time and at half-time in extra time.)
