= Valentina Fuentes =

Chilean footballer

Personal information
- Full name: Valentina Constanza Fuentes Morales
- Date of birth: 14 January 1996 (age 30)
- Place of birth: Iquique, Chile
- Position: Forward

Team information
- Current team: Universidad de Concepción

Youth career
- 2008–2014: CODE Iquique

Senior career*
Years	Team	Apps	(Gls)
2019	CODE Iquique		
2020–2021	Universidad de Concepción		
2022–2025	Deportes Iquique		
2026–	Universidad de Concepción		

International career^{‡}
2024–	Chile	1	(0)
- * Club domestic league appearances and goals ‡ National team caps and goals as of 15 November 2024

Valentina Constanza Fuentes Morales (born 14 January 1996) is a Chilean footballer who plays as a forward for Universidad de Concepción in the Chilean Primera División.

== Club career ==
Born in Iquique, Chile, Fuentes began to play football at the age of 11 at local level facing male players before joining the Colegio Deportivo Iquique (CODE Iquique) team, then the women's team of Deportes Iquique. She left the football activity for about five years after becoming mother and rejoined CODE Iquique in 2019.

In 2020, Fuentes switched to Universidad de Concepción.

In 2022, Fuentes returned to Deportes Iquique. She became the team top goalscorer of the 2023 season with 10 goals and 3 assists and was nominated as one of the best wingers of the Chilean championship, renewing her contract for the next season.

In 2026, Fuentes returned to Universidad de Concepción.

== International career ==
In October 2024, Fuentes received her first call-up to the Chile national team under Luis Mena for two friendlies against Ecuador. She made her debut in the first match on 25 October by replacing Yenny Acuña at the minute 83.

== Personal life ==
Fuentes has three children.
