= Danna Pesántez =

Ecuadorian footballer (born 2003)

Personal information
- Full name: Danna Melissa Pesántez Carmona
- Date of birth: 29 August 2003 (age 23)
- Place of birth: Cuenca, Ecuador
- Height: 1.56 m (5 ft 1 in)
- Positions: Defender; midfielder

Senior career*
Years	Team	Apps	(Gls)
2018–2022	Carneras UPS	50	(17)
2021	→ El Nacional (loan)	0	(0)
2022–2023	UAI Urquiza	22	(0)
2024	Red Bull Bragantino	1	(0)
2025	Querétaro	0	(0)

International career^{‡}
2021–	Ecuador	6	(1)
- * Club domestic league appearances and goals as of 11 May 2024. ‡ National team caps and goals as of 20 July 2022

Danna Melissa Pesántez Carmona (born 29 August 2003) is an Ecuadorian professional footballer who plays as a defender or midfielder for Brasileirão Feminino club Red Bull Bragantino and the Ecuador women's national team.

== Early life ==
Pesántez is a native of Cuenca, Ecuador.

== Club career ==
In 2022, Pesántez signed for Argentine side UAI Urquiza, where she was regarded as one of the club's most important players.

== International career ==
Pesántez has represented Ecuador internationally at youth level at the 2020 South American Under-20 Women's Football Championship.

== Style of play ==
Pesántez is left-footed.

== International goals ==
No.	Date	Venue	Opponent	Score	Result	Competition
1.	24 February 2024	Estadio Charrúa, Montevideo, Uruguay	Uruguay	1–0	3–1	Friendly
2.	24 February 2024	Estadio Charrúa, Montevideo, Uruguay	Uruguay	2–0	3–1	Friendly
3.	28 October 2024	Estadio Rodrigo Paz Delgado, Quito, Ecuador	Chile	1–0	1–2	Friendly
4.	22 February 2025	Estadio Rodrigo Paz Delgado, Quito, Ecuador	El Salvador	2–3	2–3	Friendly
5.	28 June 2025	Estadio Rodrigo Paz Delgado, Quito, Ecuador	Guatemala	2–0	4–0	Friendly
6.	28 June 2025	Estadio Rodrigo Paz Delgado, Quito, Ecuador	Guatemala	3–0	4–0	Friendly

== Personal life ==
Pesántez has an older brother and a younger sister.
