= Kerlly Real =

Ecuadorian footballer (born 1998)

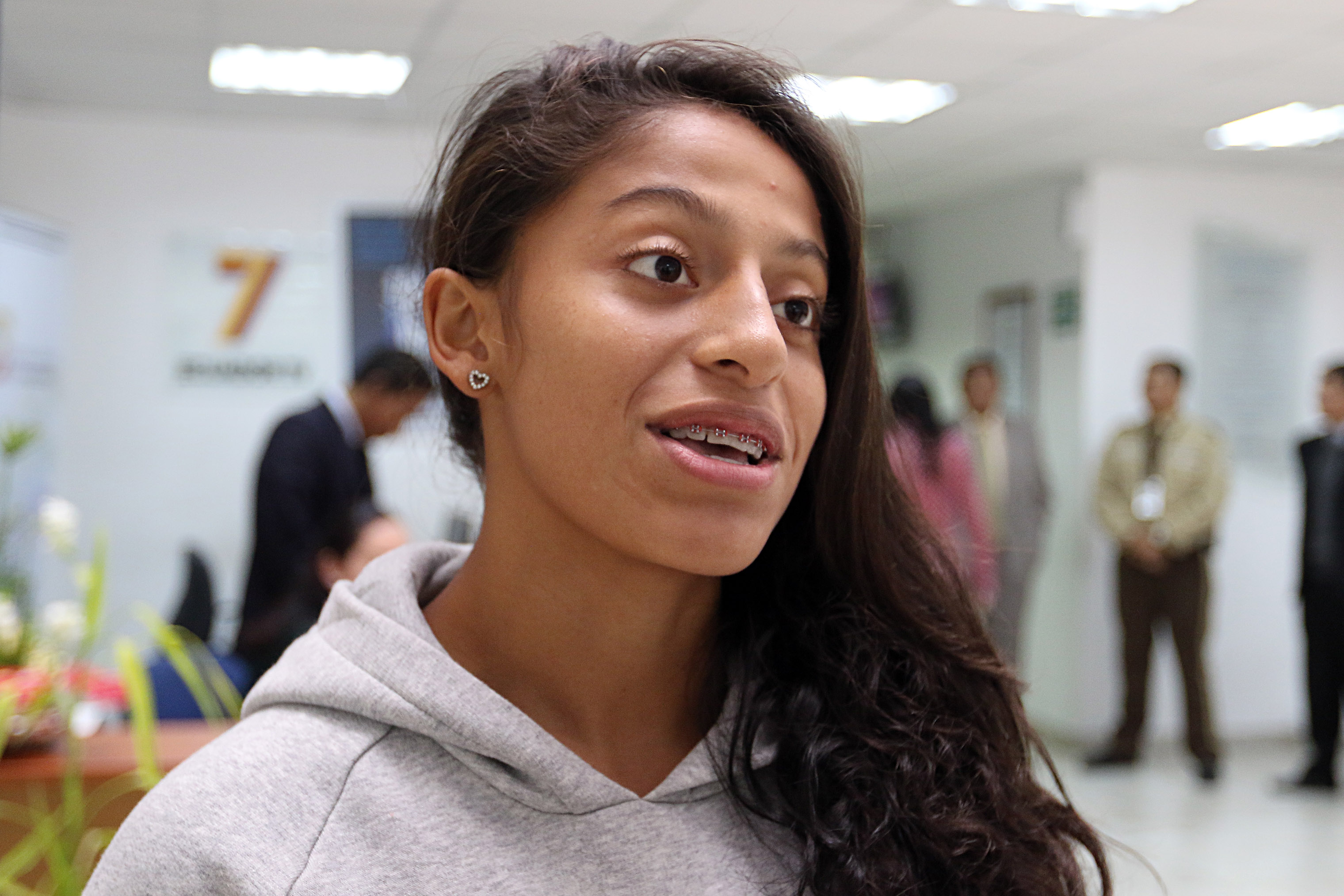
- Real in 2015

Personal information
- Full name: Kerlly Lizeth Real Carranza
- Date of birth: 7 November 1998 (age 27)
- Place of birth: Quito, Ecuador
- Height: 1.63 m (5 ft 4 in)
- Position: Midfielder

Senior career*
Years	Team	Apps	(Gls)
2012	Deportivo Quito		
2013–2014	Quito FC		
2014–2015	Galapagos SC		
2015	Quito FC		
2015–2016	Espuce		
2017–2018	Málaga		
2018–2020	Córdoba	22	(1)
2020–2025	Valencia	70	(1)
2025–2026	Parma	13	(1)

International career^{‡}
2014–	Ecuador	27	(2)
- * Club domestic league appearances and goals as of 21 February 2026 ‡ National team caps and goals as of 17 June 2015

Kerlly Lizeth Real Carranza (born 7 November 1998) is an Ecuadorian professional footballer who plays as a midfielder for Ecuador women's national team.

== International career ==
She was part of the Ecuadorian squad for the 2015 FIFA Women's World Cup.

== International goals ==
No.	Date	Venue	Opponent	Score	Result	Competition
1.	8 April 2024	Belek Football Training Camp, Belek, Turkey	Russia	2–3	2–3	Friendly
