= Giannina Lattanzio =

Ecuadorian footballer (born 1993)

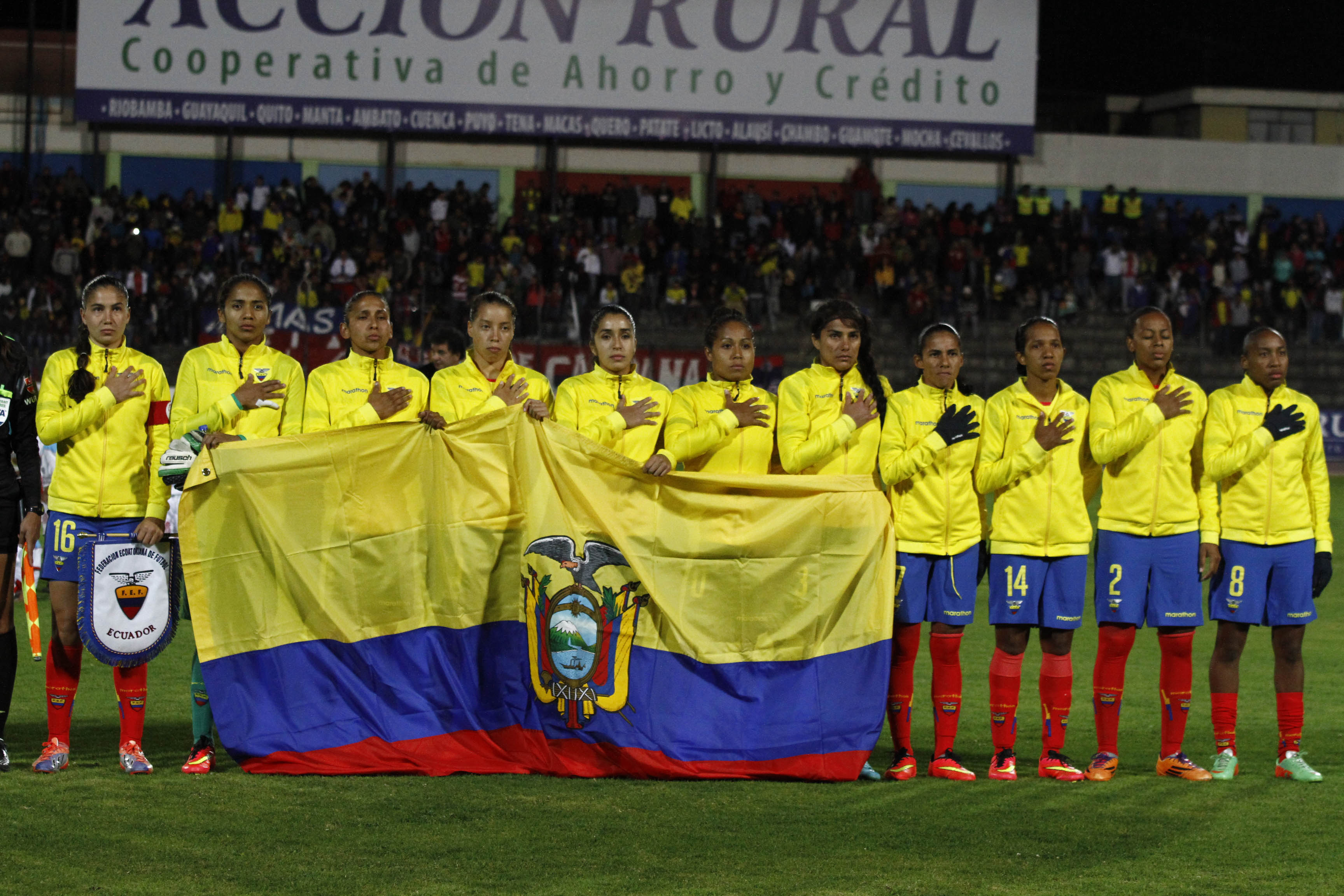
- Lattanzio with Ecuador in 2014

Personal information
- Full name: Giannina María Lattanzio Flores
- Birth name: Giannina Maria Lattanzio
- Date of birth: 19 May 1993 (age 33)
- Place of birth: Milan, Italy
- Height: 1.66 m (5 ft 5 in)
- Position: Forward

Youth career
- 2006–2011: Inter Milan

Senior career*
Years	Team	Apps	(Gls)
2011	LDU Quito		
2013	Guayas selection		
2013–2015	Rocafuerte FC		
2015	7 de Febrero		
2015–2017	Unión Española		
2017	Universidad Católica		
2017–2018	Unión Española	4	(0)
2018	OSA FC	0	(0)
2018	Universidad Católica		
2018	LDJ Macas		
2019	Joventut Almassora	1	(0)
2019	Deportivo Cuenca	5	(0)
2020–2021	Dragonas IDV	18	(3)
2022	Barcelona de Guayaquil	3	(0)
2023	América de Cali	6	(1)
2023	Pavia	11	(2)
2024	Ravenna	19	(1)

International career^{‡}
2014–2022	Ecuador	14	(0)
- * Club domestic league appearances and goals as of 11 May 2024. ‡ National team caps and goals as of 15:38, 17 June 2015 (UTC)

Giannina María Lattanzio Flores (born 19 May 1993) is a footballer who plays as a forward. Born in Italy, she plays for the Ecuador women's national team. She represented Ecuadot at the 2015 FIFA Women's World Cup.
