= Paola Guzmán =

Bolivian footballer (born 1998)

Personal information
- Full name: Paola Guzmán Carrasco
- Date of birth: 12 June 1998 (age 28)
- Height: 1.64 m (5 ft 5 in)
- Positions: Forward; midfielder

Team information
- Current team: Sporting Plaza de Argel

Senior career*
Years	Team	Apps	(Gls)
- Universidad
2019–2020	Joventut Almassora B	12	(8)
2020–2021	Viajes InterRías	5+	(1+)
2021–2022	Nuestra Señora de Burgos		
2022–	Sporting Plaza de Argel	0	(0)

International career^{‡}
2021–	Bolivia	1	(0)
- * Club domestic league appearances and goals as of 30 January 2021. ‡ National team caps and goals as of 24 February 2021.

Paola Guzmán Carrasco (born 12 June 1998) is a Bolivian footballer who plays as a forward or a midfielder for Spanish Segunda Federación club Sporting Plaza de Argel and the Bolivia women's national team.

== Club career ==
Guzmán has played for UD Universidad in Bolivia and for Joventut Almassora CF and Viajes InterRías FF in Spain.

== International career ==
Guzmán made her senior debut for Bolivia on 21 February 2021 in a 0–3 friendly away loss to Ecuador.
