= Valentina Navarrete =

Chilean footballer (born 2003)

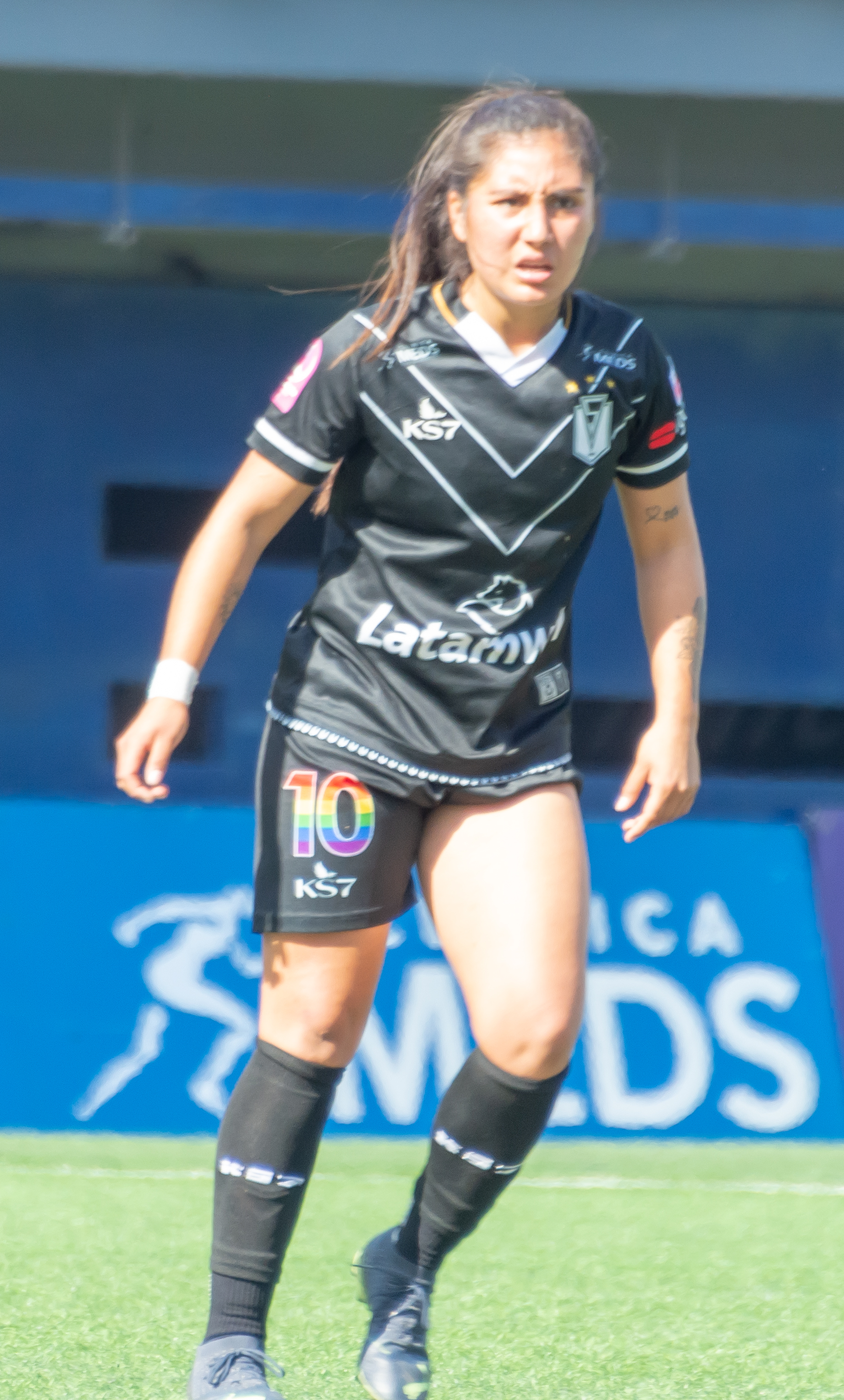
- Navarrete with Santiago Morning in 2023

Personal information
- Full name: Valentina Arlette Navarrete Acuña
- Date of birth: 13 June 2003 (age 23)
- Place of birth: Mulchén, Chile
- Height: 1.59 m (5 ft 3 in)
- Position: Attacking midfielder

Team information
- Current team: Universidad Católica

Youth career
- Lautaro de Mulchén
- Real Victoria

Senior career*
Years	Team	Apps	(Gls)
2019–2021	Universidad de Concepción		
2021–2024	Santiago Morning		
2025	Universidad de Chile	26	(13)
2026–	Universidad Católica		

International career^{‡}
2019	Chile U17		
2020	Chile U20		
2021–	Chile	11	(0)
- * Club domestic league appearances and goals ‡ National team caps and goals as of 17 January 2024

Valentina Arlette Navarrete Acuña (born 13 June 2003) is a Chilean footballer who plays as an attacking midfielder for Universidad Católica.

== Club career ==
Born in Mulchén, Navarrete played for Lautaro de Mulchén and Real Victoria from Los Ángeles before joining Universidad de Concepción at the age of fifteen after being seen by the coach Nilson Concha in a futsal championship in Quillón.

In 2021, Navarrete switched to Santiago Morning. She left them at the end of the 2024 season.

In 2025, Navarrete signed with Universidad de Chile. The next year, she switched to Universidad Católica.

== International career ==
At youth level, Navarrete represented Chile U17 in 2019, winning the Torneo 4 Naciones in Argentina. The next year, she represented the under-20s in the South American Championship.

At senior level, she made her debut in a 2–0 loss against Colombia on 23 October 2021.

== Honours ==
Chile U17

- Torneo 4 Naciones: 2019

Individual

- Premios FutFem - Revelation Player: 2022
