= Marthina Aguirre =

Ecuadorian footballer (born 2001)

Personal information
- Full name: Marthina Simonne Aguirre Alarcón
- Date of birth: 25 January 2001 (age 25)
- Place of birth: Denville, New Jersey, United States
- Height: 1.63 m (5 ft 4 in)
- Position: Winger

Team information
- Current team: South Alabama Jaguars
- Number: 20

Youth career
- 2013: Strikers FC

College career
Years	Team	Apps	(Gls)
2021–	South Alabama Jaguars	2	(0)

Senior career*
Years	Team	Apps	(Gls)
2014–2019	USFQ		
2019–2021	Dragonas IDV	17+	(3+)
2024–2025	Peterborough United		

International career^{‡}
2020	Ecuador U20	4	(1)
2020–	Ecuador	6	(1)
- * Club domestic league appearances and goals as of 22 August 2021. ‡ National team caps and goals as of 13 April 2021.

Marthina Simonne Aguirre Alarcón (born 25 January 2001) is an Ecuadorian footballer who plays as a midfielder for college team South Alabama Jaguars and the Ecuador women's national team.

== Early life ==
Aguirre was born and raised in Denville, New Jersey. Her parents are Ecuadorian.

== High school and college career ==
Aguirre has attended the Isaac Newton Private Educational Unit in Quito and the University of South Alabama in Mobile, Alabama.

== Club career ==
Aguirre has played for Universidad San Francisco de Quito and Dragonas IDV in Ecuador.

On 21 November 2024, Aguirre signed for Peterborough United. She left the club in the summer of 2025 in order to return to Ecuador, after scoring 1 goal in 8 total appearances.

== International career ==
Aguirre made her senior debut for Ecuador on 27 November 2020.
