= Andrea Vera =

Ecuadorian footballer (born 1993)

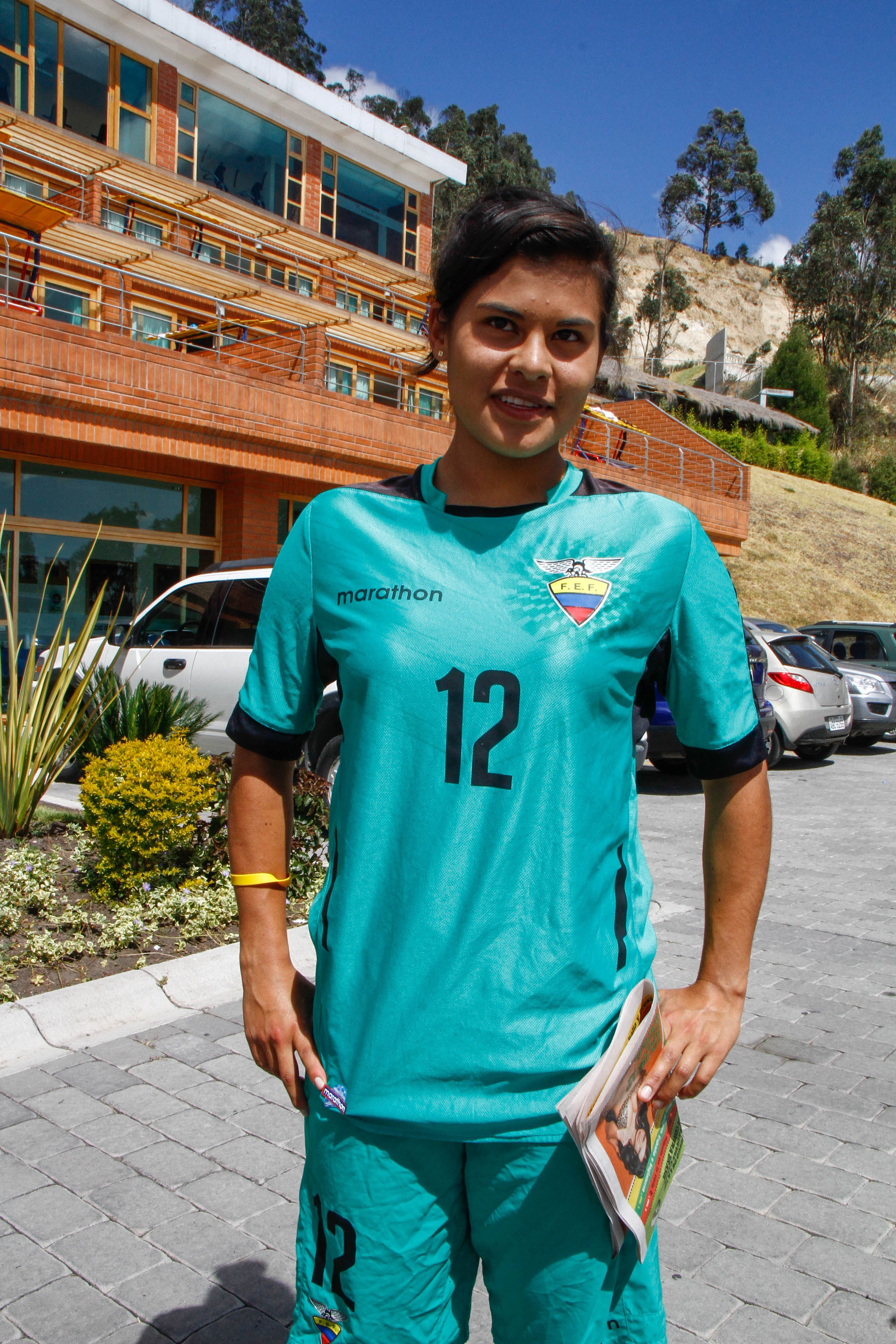
- Vera in 2014

Personal information
- Full name: Andrea Carolina Vera Coral
- Date of birth: 10 April 1993 (age 33)
- Place of birth: Quito, Ecuador
- Height: 1.71 m (5 ft 7 in)
- Position: Goalkeeper

Team information
- Current team: Deportivo Cali
- Number: 12

College career
Years	Team	Apps	(Gls)
2015	Hutchinson Blue Dragons		
2016–2018	Rio Grande RedStorm		
2017	FC Indiana		
2017	Red Grande RedStorm		

Senior career*
Years	Team	Apps	(Gls)
2013–2015	San Francisco		
2016	FC Indiana		
2020–2021	Collerense	5	(0)
2021–2022	Ñañas		
2023–2024	Dragonas IDV		
2025–	Deportivo Cali		

International career^{‡}
2015–2022	Ecuador	5	(0)
- * Club domestic league appearances and goals as of 14 February 2021 ‡ National team caps and goals as of 17:38, 17 June 2015 (UTC)

Andrea Carolina Vera Coral (born 10 April 1993) is an Ecuadorian footballer who plays as a goalkeeper for the Deportivo Cali.

== Early life ==
Vera was born and raised in Quito.

== College career ==
In 2015, Vera moved to the United States. There, she has attended the Hutchinson Community College in Hutchinson, Kansas and the University of Rio Grande in Rio Grande, Ohio.

== Club career ==
Vera has played for Universidad San Francisco in Ecuador and for FC Indiana in the US leagues United Women's Soccer and Women's Premier Soccer League Elite. In July 2020, she was signed by Spanish club UD Collerense to compete in the Segunda División Pro.

== International career ==
Vera was part of the Ecuadorian squad for the 2015 FIFA Women's World Cup and the 2015 Pan American Games.
