= Suany Fajardo =

Ecuadorian footballer (born 1994)

Personal information
- Full name: Suany Abigail Fajardo Bustamante
- Date of birth: 24 February 1994 (age 32)
- Place of birth: Guayaquil, Ecuador
- Height: 1.62 m (5 ft 4 in)
- Position: Defender

Team information
- Current team: El Nacional

Senior career*
Years	Team	Apps	(Gls)
2013	Guayas selection		
2013–2014	Rocafuerte FC		
2014–2017	Unión Española		
2016–2017	Alianza		
2017–2019	Unión Española		
2019	Deportivo Cuenca	25	(10)
2020–	El Nacional		

International career^{‡}
2018–	Ecuador	5+	(1+)
- * Club domestic league appearances and goals as of 28 September 2019 ‡ National team caps and goals as of 1 December 2020

Suany Abigail Fajardo Bustamante (born 24 February 1994) is an Ecuadorian footballer who plays as a defender for CD El Nacional and the Ecuador women's national team.

== International career ==
Fajardo capped for Ecuador at senior level during the 2018 Copa América Femenina.

=== International goals ===
Scores and results list Ecuador's goal tally first

No.	Date	Venue	Opponent	Score	Result	Competition
1	9 April 2018	Estadio Municipal Francisco Sánchez Rumoroso, Coquimbo, Chile	Argentina	3–5	3–6	2018 Copa América Femenina
