= Manoly Baquerizo =

Ecuadorian footballer (born 1998)

Personal information
- Full name: Manoly José Baquerizo Córdova
- Date of birth: 15 December 1998 (age 27)
- Place of birth: Guayaquil, Ecuador
- Height: 1.63 m (5 ft 4 in)
- Positions: Defender; midfielder

Team information
- Current team: Paris FC
- Number: 3

Youth career
- 2012–2014: Colegio Bilingüe Jefferson
- 2015: Montverde Academy

College career
| Years | Team | Apps | (Gls) |
| 2016–2019 | Clayton State Lakers | 66 | (28) |

Senior career*
| Years | Team | Apps | (Gls) |
| 2015 | Talleres Emanuel | | |
| 2020–2021 | Cáceres | 17 | (2) |
| 2021–2024 | Cacereño | 79 | (16) |
| 2024–2025 | Deportivo Alavés | 25 | (6) |
| 2025–2026 | Granada | 26 | (5) |
| 2026– | Paris FC | 0 | (0) |

International career^{‡}
| 2016 | Ecuador U-20 (futsal) | | |
| 2017 | Ecuador U-20 | | |
| 2020– | Ecuador | 1 | (0) |
- * Club domestic league appearances and goals as of 19:47, 3 July 2026 (UTC) ‡ National team caps and goals as of 27 November 2020

Manoly José Baquerizo Córdova (born 15 December 1998) is an Ecuadorian footballer who plays as a defender or midfielder for Première Ligue club Paris FC and the Ecuador national team.
