= Ámbar Torres =

Ecuadorian footballer (born 1994)

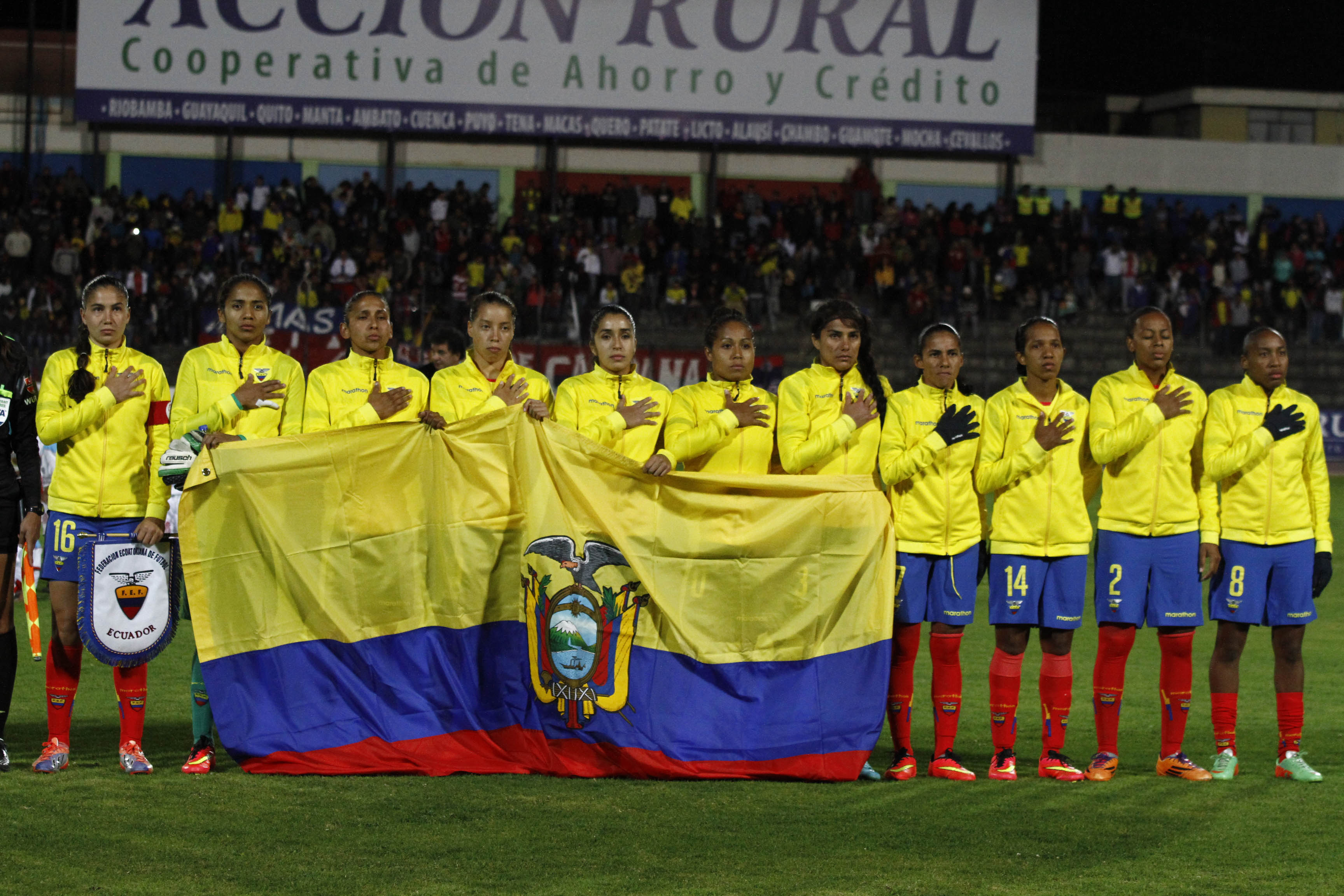
- Torres representing Ecuador at the 2014 Copa América Femenina

Personal information
- Full name: Ámbar Gillians Torres Paz
- Date of birth: 21 December 1994 (age 31)
- Place of birth: Guayaquil, Ecuador
- Height: 1.65 m (5 ft 5 in)
- Position: Forward

Team information
- Current team: Dragonas IDV
- Number: 10

College career
Years	Team	Apps	(Gls)
2017–2019	Rio Grande Red Storm		

Senior career*
Years	Team	Apps	(Gls)
2009	Deportivo Quito		
2011	LDU Quito		
2013	Guayas selection		
2013–2015	Rocafuerte FC		
2015–2017	Talleres Emanuel		
2020–2021	Ñaños FC		
2022	Ñañas		
2023–	Dragonas IDV		

International career^{‡}
2014-2022	Ecuador	24	(10)
- * Club domestic league appearances and goals as of 17:55, 22 June 2015 (UTC) ‡ National team caps and goals as of 15:40, 17 June 2015 (UTC)

Ámbar Gillians Torres Paz (born 21 December 1994) is an Ecuadorian footballer who plays as a forward for Ecuadorian women's football championship side Dragonas IDV. She was part of the Ecuadorian squad for the 2015 FIFA Women's World Cup.
