= Mónica Ramos =

Colombian footballer (born 1998)

Personal information
- Full name: Mónica Ramos Santana
- Date of birth: 14 October 1998 (age 28)
- Place of birth: Sampués, Sucre, Colombia
- Height: 1.67 m (5 ft 6 in)
- Position: Defender

Team information
- Current team: Grêmio
- Number: 20

Senior career*
| Years | Team | Apps | (Gls) |
| 2020 | Atlético Junior | | |
| 2021 | Independiente Santa Fe | 8 | (0) |
| 2022– | Grêmio | 27 | (0) |

International career^{‡}
| 2022– | Colombia | 12 | (0) |
Medal record
Women's football
Representing Colombia
Copa América Femenina
| Runner-up | 2022 Colombia |
- * Club domestic league appearances and goals as of 18 July 2023 ‡ National team caps and goals as of 18 July 2023

Mónica Ramos Santana (born 14 October 1998) is a Colombian professional footballer who plays as a defender for Grêmio and the Colombia women's national team.

== International career ==
Ramos made her international debut in a friendly against the United States on 17 June 2022. On 3 July, she was called up by Nelson Abadía to represent Colombia at the 2022 Copa América Femenina.

== Honours ==
Internacional

- Campeonato Gaúcho de Futebol Feminino: 2022

Colombia

- Copa América Femenina runner-up: 2022
