= Érika Salvatierra =

Bolivian footballer (born 1990)

Personal information
- Full name: Érika Salvatierra Durán
- Date of birth: 3 May 1990 (age 36)
- Place of birth: Santa Cruz de la Sierra, Bolivia
- Height: 1.60 m (5 ft 3 in)
- Position: Defender

Team information
- Current team: Águilas

Senior career*
Years	Team	Apps	(Gls)
2010–2013	Universidad	?	(3+)
2015–2016	Discóbolo-La Torre	?	(7)
2016–2017	Lorca Féminas (es)		
2017–2018	Aldaia	?	(1)
2018–2019	Pozoalbense	?	(?)
2020–2021	Maritim	21	(2)
2022–	Águilas	7	(2)

International career^{‡}
2008	Bolivia U20	1	(1)
2006–	Bolivia	4+	(1+)
- * Club domestic league appearances and goals as of 3 April 2022 ‡ National team caps and goals as of 8 July 2022

Érika Salvatierra Durán (born 3 May 1990) is a Bolivian footballer who plays as a defender for Spanish Primera Nacional club Águilas FC and the Bolivia women's national team.

== Club career ==
Salvatierra played for Universidad in her native Bolivia. She later moved to Spain.

== International career ==
Salvatierra has capped for Bolivia during the 2006 South American Women's Football Championship. She has also appeared at the 2008 South American U-20 Women's Championship.

== International goals ==
Scores and results are list Bolivia's goal tally first

No.	Date	Venue	Opponent	Score	Result	Competition
1.	8 July 2022	Estadio Olímpico Pascual Guerrero, Cali, Colombia	Ecuador	1–3	1–6	2022 Copa América Femenina
2.	2 June 2025	Estadio Rommel Fernández, Panama City, Panama	Panama	1–4	1–5	Friendly

== Honors and awards ==
=== Clubs ===
Universidad

- Bolivian women's football championship: 2012

== Personal life ==
Salvatierra is also a psychologist, a music therapist and a sports psychologist.
