= Gloria Villamayor =

Paraguayan footballer (born 1992)

Personal information
- Full name: Gloria Ester Villamayor Jara
- Date of birth: 10 April 1992 (age 34)
- Place of birth: Asunción, Paraguay
- Height: 1.70 m (5 ft 7 in)
- Position: Forward

Team information
- Current team: Universidad de Concepción

Senior career*
Years	Team	Apps	(Gls)
2006–2008	Cerro Porteño		
2009	UAA		
2010	Everton		
2011–2016	Colo-Colo		
2016–2017	Zaragoza	27	(2)
2017–2018	Colo-Colo		
2018	Patriotas Boyacá		
2018	Cerro Porteño (futsal)		
2018–2020	Oviedo	32	(25)
2020–2021	Racing Féminas	20	(5)
2021–2022	AEM		
2022–2023	Toluca	7	(0)
2023	Saprissa		
2023	Libertad/Limpeño		
2024	Santa Fe		
2025	Rosario Central	14	(3)
2026–	Universidad de Concepción		

International career
- Paraguay
- * Club domestic league appearances and goals

Gloria Ester “Loli” Villamayor Jara (born 10 April 1992) is a Paraguayan footballer who plays as a forward for Chilean club Universidad de Concepción.

== Career ==
Villamayor played for Colo-Colo, from 2011 to 2016, in the Chilean women's football championship. In 2026, the Association of Researchers of Chilean Football (ASIFUCH) confirmed she is the top goalscorer in the club history with about 400 goals in total.

With Everton, she was the top-scorer of the 2010 Copa Libertadores Femenina.

In January 2026, Villamayor returned to Chile and joined Universidad de Concepción from Rosario Central.

== Personal life ==
She have been the partner of her fellow footballer María Martínez Vecca since they met representing Paraguay at the 2019 Pan American Games.
