= Graciela Martínez =

Paraguayan footballer (born 2001)

Personal information
- Full name: Graciela Esmilce Martínez Esquivel
- Date of birth: 24 May 2001 (age 25)
- Place of birth: San Lorenzo, Paraguay
- Height: 1.58 m (5 ft 2 in)
- Position: Forward

Team information
- Current team: Real Ariquemes

Senior career*
Years	Team	Apps	(Gls)
- Cerro Porteño
2021–2022	Ferroviária	1	(0)
2022	→ Vasco da Gama (loan)		
2023–	Real Ariquemes	0	(0)

International career^{‡}
2016	Paraguay U17	1	(0)
2018	Paraguay U20	0	(0)
2018–	Paraguay	1	(0)
- * Club domestic league appearances and goals as of 29 August 2021 ‡ National team caps and goals as of 13 August 2018

Graciela Esmilce Martínez Esquivel (born 24 May 2001) is a Paraguayan professional footballer who plays as a forward for Brazilian Série A1 club Real Ariquemes EC on loan from Associação Ferroviária de Esportes and for the Paraguay women's national team. Martínez has also made appearances for the Paraguay women's U17 and U20 teams.

== Club career ==
In April 2022, Martínez was loaned to Vasco da Gama until the end of the year.
