= Ana Paula Rojas =

Bolivian footballer (born 1997)

Personal information
- Full name: Ana Paula Rojas Huarayo
- Date of birth: 17 July 1997 (age 29)
- Height: 1.55 m (5 ft 1 in)
- Position: Midfielder

Team information
- Current team: Astor

Senior career*
Years	Team	Apps	(Gls)
- San Martín de Porres
- Astor

International career^{‡}
2012	Bolivia U17	1+	(1)
2014	Bolivia U20	2+	(2)
2014–	Bolivia	8	(0)
- * Club domestic league appearances and goals ‡ National team caps and goals as of 13 April 2018

Ana Paula Rojas Huarayo (born 17 July 1997) is a Bolivian footballer who plays as a midfielder for Astor and the Bolivia women's national team.

== Early life ==
Rojas hails from the Cochabamba Department.

== International career ==
Rojas represented Bolivia at the 2012 South American U-17 Women's Championship and the 2014 South American U-20 Women's Championship. At senior level, she played two Copa América Femenina editions (2014 and 2018).
