= Natalia Campos =

Chilean footballer (born 1992)

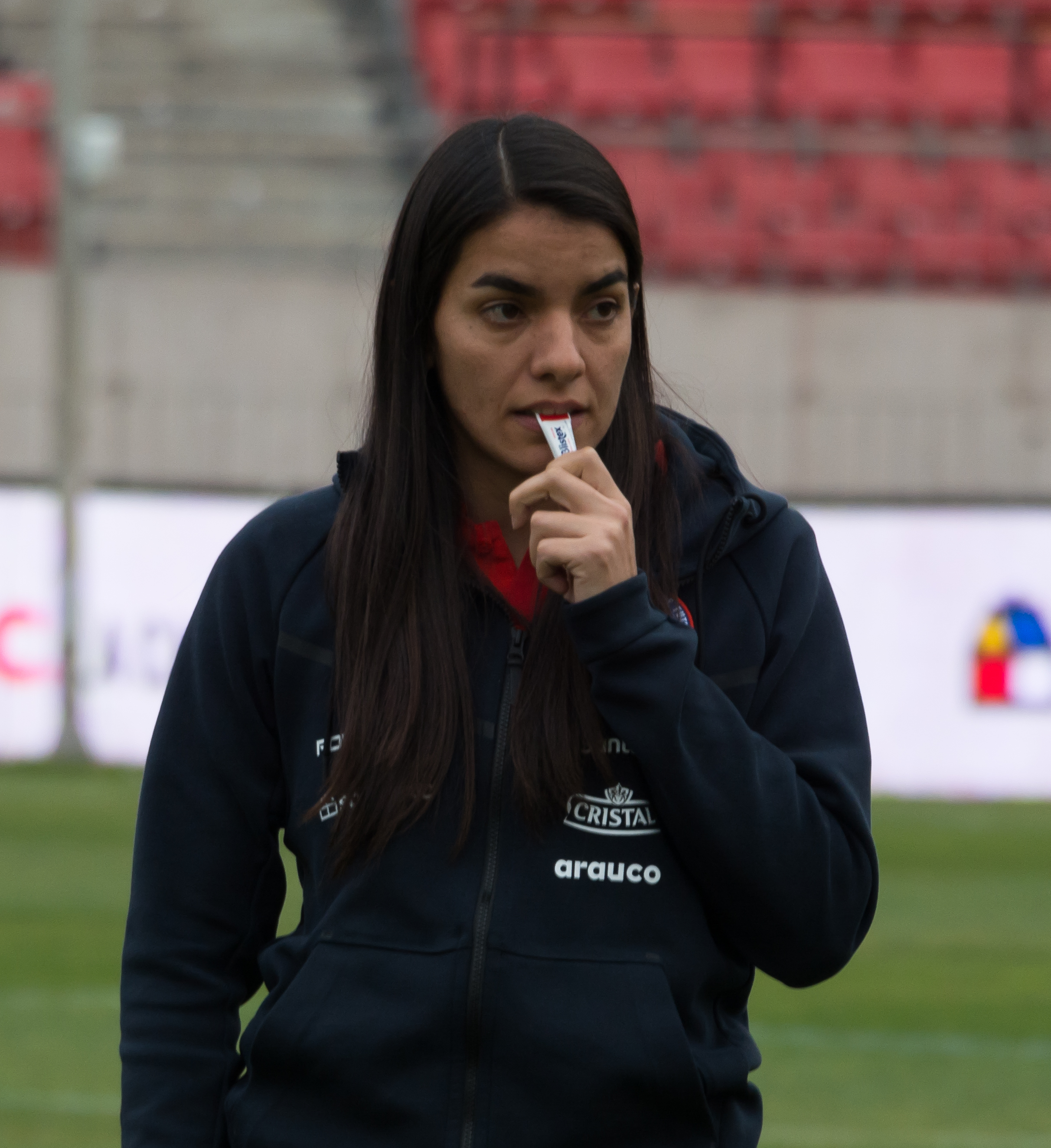
- Campos with Chile in 2019

Personal information
- Full name: Natalia Carolina Campos Fernández
- Date of birth: 12 January 1992 (age 34)
- Place of birth: Las Condes, Santiago, Chile
- Height: 1.69 m (5 ft 6 1/2 in)
- Position: Goalkeeper

Team information
- Current team: Universidad Católica
- Number: 1

Youth career
- 2009–2010: Universidad Católica

Senior career*
Years	Team	Apps	(Gls)
2010–2013	Universidad Católica		
2014–2015	Audax Italiano		
2016–2019	Universidad Católica		
2016	→ Colo-Colo (loan)	–	(–)
2019–2021	Fundación Albacete	2+	(0)
2021–2024	Universidad de Chile		
2025	Unión Española	28	(0)
2026–	Universidad Católica		

International career
2010–2022	Chile	14	(0)
- * Club domestic league appearances and goals as of 28 January 2026

Natalia Carolina Campos Fernández (born 12 January 1992) is a Chilean footballer who plays as a goalkeeper for Universidad Católica.

== Club career ==
In 2019, Campos moved abroad and joined Spanish club Fundación Albacete.

A player of Universidad de Chile since 2021, she left them at the end of the 2024 season.

In 2025, Campos signed with Unión Española.

In January 2026, Campos returned to Universidad Católica, her training and first club in her career.

== International career ==
Campos made her senior debut for Chile during the 2014 Copa América Femenina in a 0–2 loss to Brazil on 19 September. She is the second choice for the Chilean goal after team captain Christiane Endler.

== Honours ==
Universidad de Chile

- Primera División (1): 2021

Individual

- Premios Contragolpe - Best Goalkeeper: 2021
- Premios Contragolpe - Ideal Team: 2021
