= Lorena Alonso =

Paraguayan footballer (born 1998)

Personal information
- Full name: Lorena Beatriz Alonso Ortiz
- Date of birth: 1 April 1998 (age 28)
- Height: 1.68 m (5 ft 6 in)
- Positions: Defender; midfielder

Team information
- Current team: Sol de América

Senior career*
Years	Team	Apps	(Gls)
–2018	UAA		
2019–	Sol de América		

International career^{‡}
2014	Paraguay U17	3	(0)
2018	Paraguay U20	3	(0)
2019–	Paraguay	1	(0)
- * Club domestic league appearances and goals ‡ National team caps and goals as of 9 August 2019

Lorena Beatriz Alonso Ortiz (born 1 April 1998) is a Paraguayan footballer who plays as a defender for Club Sol de América and the Paraguay women's national team. Alonso has also made appearances for the Paraguay women's under-20 and under-17 teams.

== International career ==
Alonso represented Paraguay at the 2014 FIFA U-17 Women's World Cup and the 2018 FIFA U-20 Women's World Cup. She made her senior debut on 9 August 2019 against Costa Rica in the 2019 Pan American Games.

== International goals ==
No.	Date	Venue	Opponent	Score	Result	Competition
1.	25 October 2023	Estadio Sausalito, Viña del Mar, Chile	Jamaica	1–0	10–0	2023 Pan American Games
