= Gloria Saleb =

Paraguayan footballer (born 1991)

Personal information
- Full name: Gloria Stefani Saleb López
- Date of birth: 12 June 1991 (age 35)
- Height: 1.63 m (5 ft 4 in)
- Position: Goalkeeper

Team information
- Current team: Cerro Porteño
- Number: 1

Senior career*
Years	Team	Apps	(Gls)
- Cerro Porteño

International career
	Paraguay	2+	(0)
- * Club domestic league appearances and goals

Gloria Stefani Saleb López (born 12 June 1991) is a Paraguayan footballer who plays as a goalkeeper for the Asunción-based Cerro Porteño. She was a member of the Paraguay women's national team.

== International career ==
Saleb represented Paraguay at the Copa América Femenina in 2014 and 2018.
