= Daysy Bareiro =

Paraguayan footballer (born 2001)

Personal information
- Full name: Daysy María Jesús Bareiro Martínez
- Date of birth: 19 January 2001 (age 25)
- Place of birth: Asunción, Paraguay
- Height: 1.54 m (5 ft 1 in)
- Position: Defender

Team information
- Current team: Juan Grande
- Number: 18

Senior career*
Years	Team	Apps	(Gls)
–2018	Cerro Porteño		
2019–2020	Sol de América		
2020–	Juan Grande	43	(2)

International career^{‡}
2016	Paraguay U17	3	(0)
2018	Paraguay U20	1	(0)
2019–	Paraguay	1	(0)
- * Club domestic league appearances and goals as of 28 May 2022 ‡ National team caps and goals as of 3 August 2019

Daysy María Jesús Bareiro Martínez (born 19 January 2001) is a Paraguayan footballer who plays as a defender for Spanish Primera Federación club CD Juan Grande and the Paraguay women's national team. She has also played for the Paraguay women's U20 and U17 teams.

== International goals ==
No.	Date	Venue	Opponent	Score	Result	Competition
1.	25 October 2023	Estadio Sausalito, Viña del Mar, Chile	Jamaica	9–0	10–0	2023 Pan American Games
