= Antonia Canales =

Chilean footballer (born 2002)

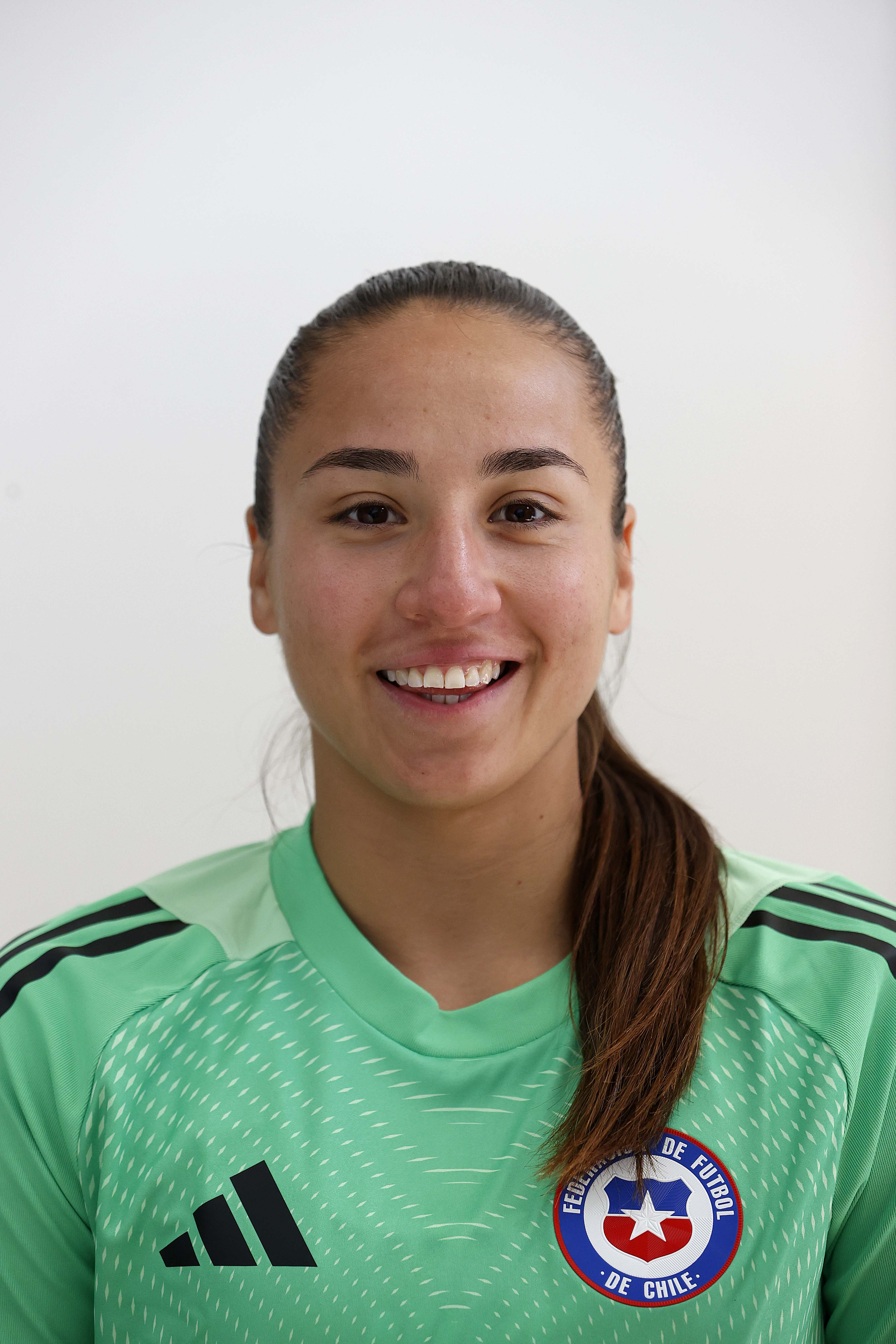
- Fútbol Club Badalona Women 2025

Personal information
- Full name: Antonia Ignacia Canales Pacheco
- Date of birth: 16 October 2002 (age 24)
- Place of birth: Santiago, Chile
- Height: 1.75 m (5 ft 9 in)
- Position: Goalkeeper

Team information
- Current team: Levante Badalona

Youth career
- Universidad Católica

Senior career*
Years	Team	Apps	(Gls)
2017–2021	Universidad Católica		
2022	Colo-Colo		
2023	Real Oviedo	15	(0)
2023–2025	Valencia	46	(0)
2025–	Levante Badalona	0	(0)

International career
2018–2022	Chile U20	8	(0)
2019–	Chile	4	(0)
Medal record
Women's football
Representing Chile
Pan American Games
Silver medal – second place	2023 Santiago	Team
- * Club domestic league appearances and goals as of 10 July 2025

Antonia Ignacia Canales Pacheco (born 16 October 2002) is a Chilean professional footballer who plays as a goalkeeper for Liga F club Levante Badalona and the Chile women's national team.

== Club career ==
A product of Universidad Católica, she switched to Colo-Colo in 2022.

In 2023, Canales moved abroad and joined Real Oviedo in the Spanish Segunda División. In July of the same year, she switched to Valencia.

In July 2025, Canales signed with Levante Badalona.

== International career ==
At under-20 level, she was part of the Chile squad at the 2018 South American Games.

She was part of the Chilean Football team in the football competition at the 2020 Summer Olympics.

She was part of the Chile squad at the 2023 Pan American Games, where Chile won the silver medal. Following the semi-final match against the United States, she returned to her club, Valencia.

== Honours ==
Chile

- Pan American Games Silver Medal: 2023
