= Ramona Martínez =

Paraguayan footballer (born 1996)

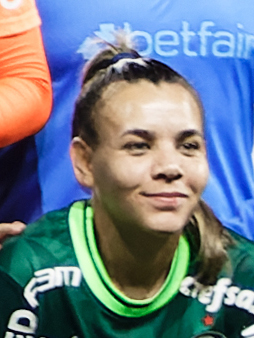

Personal information
- Full name: Ramona Ygnacia Martínez
- Date of birth: 21 July 1996 (age 30)
- Height: 1.55 m (5 ft 1 in)
- Position: Midfielder

Team information
- Current team: Palmeiras
- Number: 15

Senior career*
Years	Team	Apps	(Gls)
- Deportivo Capiatá
2023–	Palmeiras	1	(0)

International career^{‡}
2016	Paraguay U-20 (futsal)		
2018–	Paraguay	15	(2)
- * Club domestic league appearances and goals as of 5 March 2023 ‡ National team caps and goals as of 23 February 2023

Ramona Ygnacia Martínez (born 21 July 1996) is a Paraguayan professional footballer who plays as a midfielder for Brazilian Série A1 club SE Palmeiras and, since 2018, for the Paraguay women's national team. She is also a futsal player.

== International career ==
Martínez played for Paraguay at senior level in the 2018 Copa América Femenina.

== International goals ==
No.	Date	Venue	Opponent	Score	Result	Competition
1.	25 October 2023	Estadio Sausalito, Viña del Mar, Chile	Jamaica	8–0	10–0	2023 Pan American Games
