= María Martínez (footballer) =

Paraguayan footballer (born 1999)

Personal information
- Full name: María Auxiliadora Martínez Vecca
- Date of birth: 24 May 1999 (age 27)
- Place of birth: Itauguá, Paraguay
- Height: 1.68 m (5 ft 6 in)
- Positions: Right back; centre back; right midfielder

Team information
- Current team: Universidad de Concepción

Senior career*
Years	Team	Apps	(Gls)
2014–2021	Deportivo Capiatá		
2021	Napoli Caçador	8	(0)
2022	Sportivo Limpeño		
2022–2023	Universidad de Chile		
2024	Minas Brasília		
2025	Rosario Central	21	(1)
2026–	Universidad de Concepción		

International career^{‡}
2016	Paraguay U17	3	(0)
2018	Paraguay U20	3	(0)
2019–	Paraguay	3	(0)
- * Club domestic league appearances and goals as of 8 January 2026 ‡ National team caps and goals as of 3 August 2019

María Auxiliadora “Yaki” Martínez Vecca (born 24 May 1999), also known as María Vecca and Yaki Vecca, is a Paraguayan professional footballer who plays as a center back for Chilean club Universidad de Concepción and the Paraguay women's national team. She has also played for the Paraguay women's U17 and U20 teams.

== Career ==
Martínez played for Universidad de Chile in 2022–23. She returned to Chile with Universidad de Concepción for the 2026 season from Argentine club Rosario Central.

== Personal life ==
She has been the partner of her fellow footballer Gloria Villamayor since they met representing Paraguay at the 2019 Pan American Games.
