= Limpia Fretes =

Paraguayan footballer (born 2000)

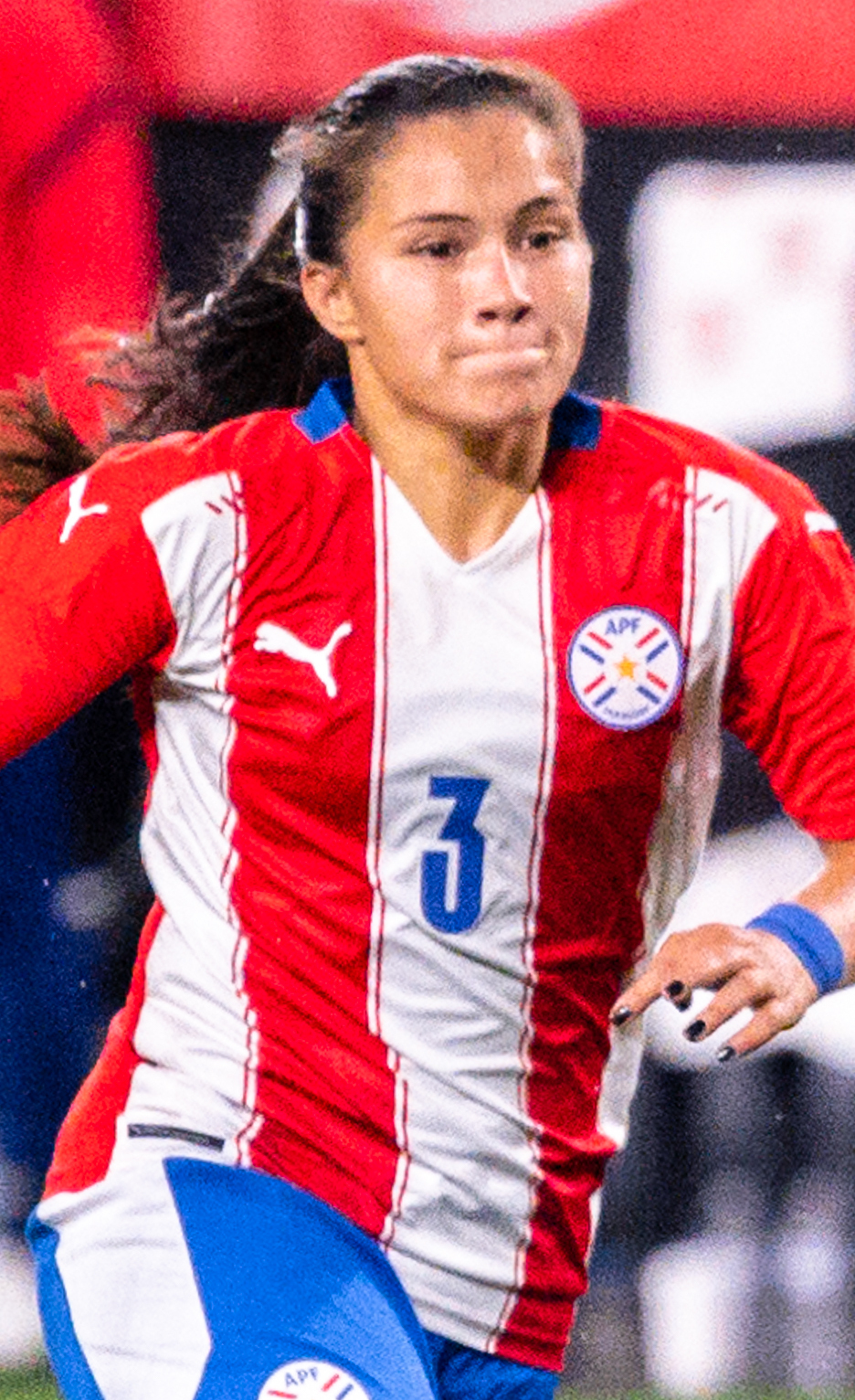
- Fretes with Paraguay in 2021

Personal information
- Full name: Limpia Concepción Fretes Cáceres
- Date of birth: 24 June 2000 (age 26)
- Place of birth: Asunción, Paraguay
- Height: 1.59 m (5 ft 3 in)
- Position: Left back

Team information
- Current team: Juventude
- Number: 16

Senior career*
Years	Team	Apps	(Gls)
2015–2019	Cerro Porteño		
2020	Sol de América		
2021	Cerro Porteño		
2022	Libertad		
2023	Avaí		
2024–2025	Cruzeiro		
2026–	Juventude		

International career^{‡}
2016	Paraguay U17	3	(1)
2018–2020	Paraguay U20	7	(1)
2018–	Paraguay	22	(0)
- * Club domestic league appearances and goals as of 5 March 2023 ‡ National team caps and goals as of 23 February 2023

Limpia Concepción Fretes Cáceres (born 24 June 2000) is a Paraguayan professional footballer who plays as a left back for Brazilian Série A1 club Juventude and the Paraguay women's national team. She was previously also a part of Paraguay's women's under-20 and under-17 teams.
