= Yenny Acuña =

Chilean footballer (born 1997)

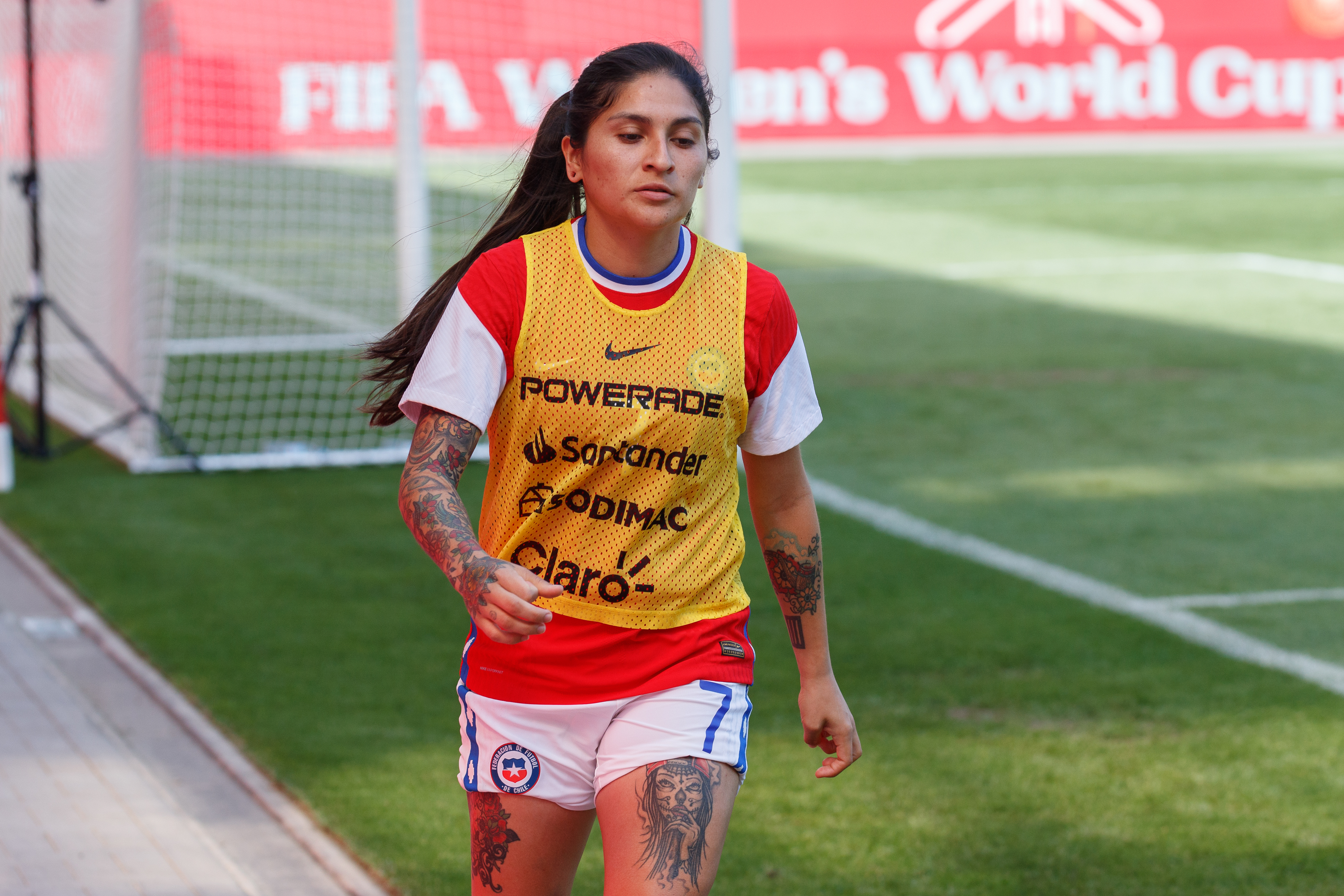
- Yenny Acuña with Chile in 2021

Personal information
- Full name: Yenny Andrea Acuña Berrios
- Date of birth: 18 May 1997 (age 29)
- Place of birth: Iquique, Chile
- Height: 1.61 m (5 ft 3 in)
- Position: Striker

Team information
- Current team: Colo-Colo (on loan from Internacional)

Senior career*
Years	Team	Apps	(Gls)
2017–2019	Deportes Iquique	43	(48)
2020–2023	Santiago Morning	58	(46)
2023	Bahia	12	(4)
2024–	Internacional		
2024–	→ Colo-Colo (loan)	38	(26)

International career^{‡}
2021–	Chile	25	(4)
Medal record
Women's football
Representing Chile
Pan American Games
Silver medal – second place	2023 Santiago	Team
- * Club domestic league appearances and goals as of 2 September 2025 ‡ National team caps and goals as of 21 February 2023

Yenny Andrea Acuña Berrios (born 18 May 1997) is a Chilean professional footballer who plays as a striker for Colo-Colo on loan from Brazilian Série A1 club Internacional and the Chile women's national team.

== Club career ==
Acuña started her career on Deportes Iquique. She joined Santiago Morning in 2020. She scored the first goal in the 2020 Campeonato Nacional Fútbol Femenino final against Club Universidad de Chile, in a 2–0 victory.

In February 2023, she joined Brazilian club Bahia. In November of the same year, she switched to Internacional. In the second half of 2024, she was loaned out to Colo-Colo until the end of the year.

== International career ==
Acuña made her senior debut on 13 April 2021 in a 0–0 draw against Cameroon for the Olympics Intercontinental Play-offs Women.

She represented Chile at the 2023 Pan American Games, where Chile won the silver medal.

=== International goals ===
No.	Date	Venue	Opponent	Score	Result	Competition
1.	23 September 2023	Estadio Bicentenario de La Florida, Santiago, Chile	New Zealand	2–0	3–0	Friendly
2.	5 December 2023	Estadio Municipal de La Cisterna, Santiago, Chile	Peru	5–0	6–0	Friendly

== Honours ==
Santiago Morning

- Primera División (1): 2020 Transición

Colo-Colo

- Primera División (3): 2024, 2025, 2026

Chile

- Pan American Games Silver Medal: 2023

Individual

- Primera División Ideal Team: 2024, 2025
