= Nelson Abadía =

Colombian football manager

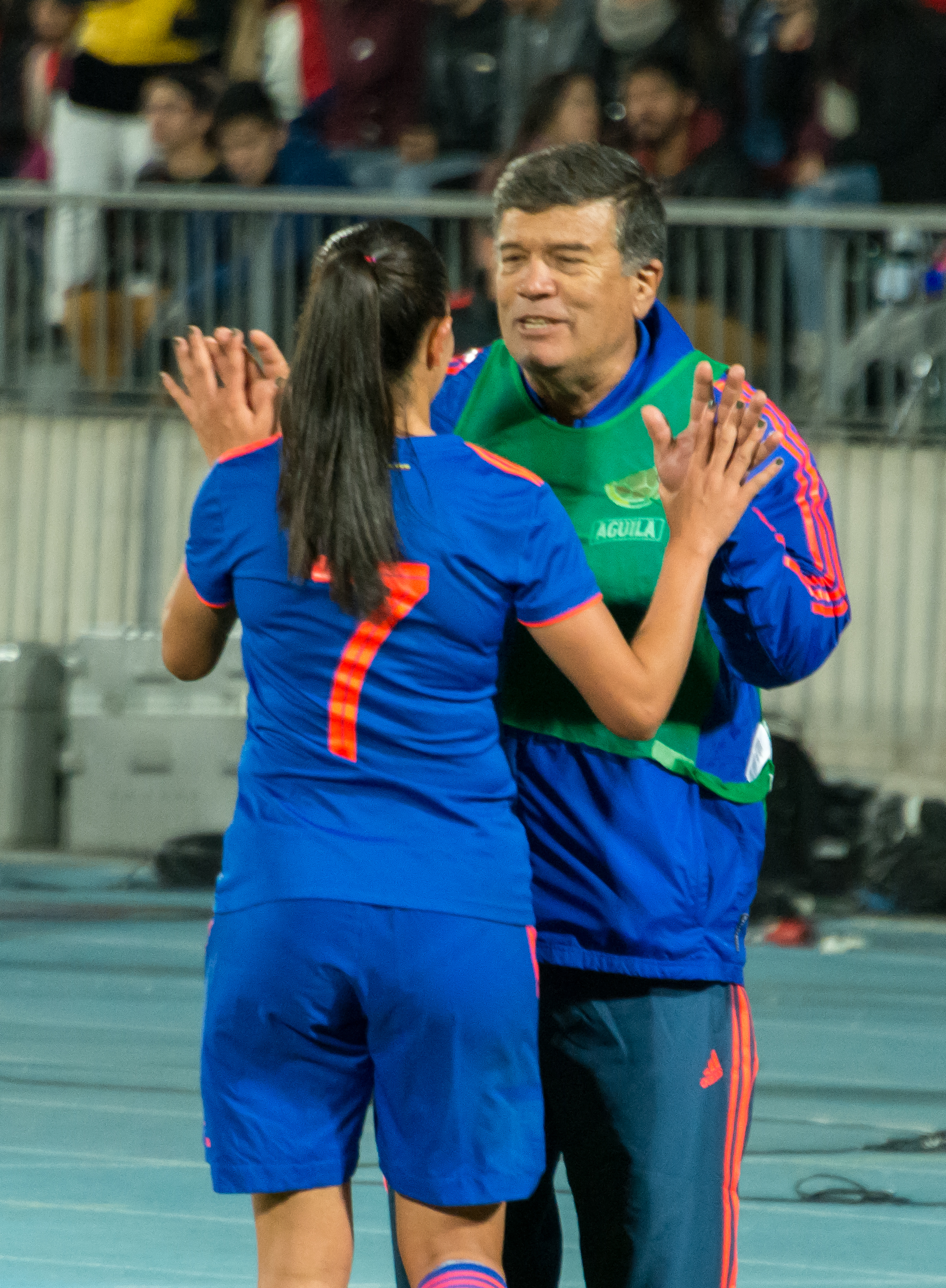

Personal information
- Full name: Nelson Abadía Aragón
- Date of birth: 5 June 1956 (age 70)
- Place of birth: Cali, Colombia

Managerial career
- Years: Team
- 1982–1983: Cúcuta Deportivo
- 1986–1988: Cúcuta Deportivo
- 1989–1990: Deportivo Pereira
- 1990–1992: Boca Juniors de Cali (youth)
- 1994–1995: Lanceros Boyacá
- 1995–1996: Atlético Huila
- 1999–2000: Delfín
- 2003: Dimerco Popayán
- 2004–2005: Tauro
- 2006–2007: Centauros Villavicencio
- 2008: Patriotas Boyacá
- 2008: Dépor
- 2013–2014: Llaneros (youth)
- 2014–2016: Colombia Women (assistant)
- 2016: América de Cali (women)
- 2017–2023: Colombia Women
- 2020–2021: Colombia Women U20

Nelson Abadía Aragón (born 5 June 1956) is a Colombian football manager. From 2017 until 31 August 2023, he served as manager of the Colombia women's team. He is the father of footballer Mario Abadía.

== Managerial career ==
At the end of the 1990s, Abadía managed the "B" team of América de Cali in Categoría Primera C organized by Difutbol. There, he was in charge of several players who turned professional such as Sandro Zuluaga, Alex del Castillo and Róbinson Zapata.

In 2004, Abadía was appointed by the Panamanian football club Tauro F.C. By 2005, the team was within 3 points of playing in the finals. In 2006, he managed the now defunct Centauros Villavicencio in Categoría Primera B. In 2008, he managed Patriotas Boyacá who were 6 points away from playing in the Primera B final.

From 2014 until 31 August 2023, Abadía was part of the Colombian women's team, first as Fabián Taborda's technical assistant and then promoted to manager.

== Honours ==
=== Manager ===
Colombia Women

- Pan American Games: 2019
