= 2022 Copa América Femenina squads =

List of players competing at the 9th edition of the Copa América Femenina

This article lists the squads for the 2022 Copa América Femenina, the 9th edition of the Copa América Femenina. The tournament is a quadrennial women's international football tournament for national teams in South America organised by CONMEBOL, and was held in Colombia from 8 to 30 July 2022. In the tournament there were ten national teams involved. Each national team registered a squad of 23 players.

The age listed for each player is on 8 July 2022, the first day of the tournament. The numbers of caps and goals listed for each player do not include any matches played after the start of tournament. The club listed is the club for which the player last played a competitive match prior to the tournament. The nationality for each club reflects the national association (not the league) to which the club is affiliated. A flag is included for coaches that are of a different nationality than their own national team.

== Group A ==
=== Bolivia ===
The squad was announced on 5 July 2022.

Head coach: (Argentina) Rosana Gómez

No.	Pos.	Player	Date of birth (age)	Club
1	GK	Kimberly López	17 May 2000 (aged 22)	(Bolivian Football Federation) Jorge Wilstermann
2	DF	Yuditza Salvatierra	26 April 2003 (aged 19)	(Bolivian Football Federation) Mundo Futuro
3	FW	Olga Sandoval	16 November 1992 (aged 29)	(Bolivian Football Federation) Real Tomayapo
4	DF	Jhylian Mamani	29 December 2004 (aged 17)	(Bolivian Football Federation) The Strongest
5	MF	Érika Salvatierra	3 May 1990 (aged 32)	(Royal Spanish Football Federation) Águilas
6	DF	María Alejandra Vaquero	23 January 1992 (aged 30)	(Bolivian Football Federation) Deportivo ITA
7	MF	Ana Paula Rojas	17 July 1997 (aged 24)	(Bolivian Football Federation) Astor
8	MF	Paola Guzmán	12 June 1998 (aged 24)	(Royal Spanish Football Federation) Viajes InterRías
9	FW	Marlene Flores	23 April 2001 (aged 21)	(Bolivian Football Federation) Real Tomayapo
11	FW	Ilsen Rodríguez	30 January 1994 (aged 28)	(Bolivian Football Federation) Always Ready
12	GK	Daniela Salguero	30 November 1992 (aged 29)	(Bolivian Football Federation) Exótico Premium
13	DF	Ericka Morales	17 December 1994 (aged 27)	(Bolivian Football Federation) Mundo Futuro
14	DF	Ariani Melgar	7 April 2002 (aged 20)	(Bolivian Football Federation) Santa Cruz FC
15	DF	Aidé Mendiola	14 November 2000 (aged 21)	(Bolivian Football Federation) Mundo Futuro
16	MF	Samantha Alurralde	4 January 2004 (aged 18)	(Bolivian Football Federation) The Strongest
18	MF	Yoselín Basualdo	15 March 2000 (aged 22)	(Bolivian Football Federation) Jorge Wilstermann
19	FW	Majhely Romero	20 January 2003 (aged 19)	(Bolivian Football Federation) Blooming
20	FW	Alizia Bejarano	8 June 2000 (aged 22)	(Bolivian Football Federation) Inter Stars Rush
21	FW	Marilin Rojas	5 June 1998 (aged 24)	(Bolivian Football Federation) Oriente Petrolero
22	MF	Brandy Flores	4 October 1999 (aged 22)	(Bolivian Football Federation) Jorge Wilstermann
23	GK	Alba Salazar	17 February 2005 (aged 17)	(Royal Spanish Football Federation) Son Sardina Atlético

=== Chile ===
The squad was announced on 29 June 2022.

Head coach: José Letelier

No.	Pos.	Player	Date of birth (age)	Caps	Goals	Club
1	GK	Christiane Endler (captain)	23 July 1991 (aged 30)	90	0	(French Football Federation) Lyon
2	FW	Valentina Navarrete	13 July 2003 (aged 18)	3	0	(Football Federation of Chile) Santiago Morning
3	DF	Carla Guerrero	23 December 1987 (aged 34)	77	6	(Football Federation of Chile) Universidad de Chile
4	MF	Francisca Lara	29 July 1990 (aged 31)	86	25	(Royal Spanish Football Federation) Villarreal
5	DF	Fernanda Ramírez	30 August 1992 (aged 29)	4	0	(Football Federation of Chile) Colo-Colo
6	MF	Nayadet López	5 August 1994 (aged 27)	15	0	(Royal Spanish Football Federation) Espanyol
7	FW	Yenny Acuña	24 March 2000 (aged 22)	15	2	(Football Federation of Chile) Santiago Morning
8	MF	Karen Araya	16 October 1990 (aged 31)	80	12	(Royal Spanish Football Federation) Sevilla
9	FW	María José Urrutia	17 December 1993 (aged 28)	38	4	(Football Federation of Chile) Colo-Colo
10	MF	Yanara Aedo	5 August 1993 (aged 28)	84	15	(Royal Spanish Football Federation) Rayo Vallecano
11	MF	Yessenia López	20 October 1990 (aged 31)	52	5	(Football Federation of Chile) Universidad de Chile
12	GK	Natalia Campos	12 January 1992 (aged 30)	15	0	(Football Federation of Chile) Universidad de Chile
13	FW	Javiera Grez	23 April 2002 (aged 20)	23	3	(Football Federation of Chile) Colo-Colo
14	DF	Daniela Pardo	9 May 1988 (aged 34)	43	3	(Football Federation of Chile) Santiago Morning
15	FW	Daniela Zamora	13 November 1990 (aged 31)	59	7	(Football Federation of Chile) Universidad de Chile
16	DF	Geraldine Leyton	11 May 1989 (aged 33)	44	1	(Football Federation of Chile) Colo-Colo
17	DF	Javiera Toro	22 April 1998 (aged 24)	21	0	(Royal Spanish Football Federation) Sevilla
18	DF	Camila Sáez	17 October 1994 (aged 27)	76	8	(Royal Spanish Football Federation) Rayo Vallecano
19	FW	María José Rojas	17 September 1987 (aged 34)	53	12	(Football Australia) Salisbury Inter
20	MF	Yastin Jiménez	17 October 2000 (aged 21)	11	0	(Football Federation of Chile) Colo-Colo
21	DF	Rosario Balmaceda	23 March 1999 (aged 23)	28	0	(Football Federation of Chile) Santiago Morning
22	FW	Mary Valencia	8 February 2003 (aged 19)	2	0	(Football Federation of Chile) Santiago Morning
23	GK	Antonia Canales	16 October 2002 (aged 19)	0	0	(Football Federation of Chile) Colo-Colo

=== Colombia ===
The squad was announced on 3 July 2022.

Head coach: Nelson Abadía

No.	Pos.	Player	Date of birth (age)	Caps	Goals	Club
1	GK	Catalina Pérez	8 November 1994 (aged 27)	14	0	(Royal Spanish Football Federation) Real Betis
2	DF	Manuela Vanegas	9 February 2000 (aged 22)	21	3	(Royal Spanish Football Federation) Real Sociedad
3	DF	Daniela Arias	31 August 1994 (aged 27)	9	1	(Mexican Football Federation) Pachuca
4	MF	Diana Ospina	3 March 1989 (aged 33)	50	6	(Colombian Football Federation) América de Cali
5	MF	Lorena Bedoya	6 August 1997 (aged 24)	5	0	(Colombian Football Federation) Atlético Nacional
6	MF	Daniela Montoya (captain)	22 August 1990 (aged 31)	46	3	(Colombian Football Federation) Atlético Junior
7	FW	Gisela Robledo	13 May 2003 (aged 19)	7	0	(Royal Spanish Football Federation) UDG Tenerife
8	MF	Angie Castañeda	4 February 1998 (aged 24)	6	0	(Royal Spanish Football Federation) Cacereño
9	FW	Mayra Ramírez	23 March 1999 (aged 23)	13	3	(Royal Spanish Football Federation) Sporting de Huelva
10	MF	Leicy Santos	16 May 1996 (aged 26)	50	10	(Royal Spanish Football Federation) Atlético Madrid
11	FW	Catalina Usme	25 December 1989 (aged 32)	66	37	(Colombian Football Federation) América de Cali
12	GK	Sandra Sepúlveda	3 March 1988 (aged 34)	35	0	(Israel Football Association) Hapoel Marmorek
13	GK	Natalia Giraldo	19 May 2003 (aged 19)	3	0	(Colombian Football Federation) América de Cali
14	DF	Ángela Barón	18 September 2003 (aged 18)	1	0	(United States Soccer Federation) D'Feeters Kicks
15	FW	Tatiana Ariza	21 February 1991 (aged 31)	21	4	(Colombian Football Federation) Deportivo Cali
16	MF	Gabriela Rodríguez	10 May 2005 (aged 17)	1	0	(Colombian Football Federation) América de Cali
17	DF	Carolina Arias	2 September 1990 (aged 31)	39	0	(Colombian Football Federation) Deportivo Cali
18	FW	Linda Caicedo	22 February 2005 (aged 17)	11	1	(Colombian Football Federation) Deportivo Cali
19	DF	Jorelyn Carabalí	18 May 1997 (aged 25)	7	0	(Colombian Football Federation) Deportivo Cali
20	DF	Mónica Ramos	14 October 1998 (aged 23)	2	0	(Brazilian Football Confederation) Grêmio
21	MF	Liana Salazar	16 September 1992 (aged 29)	24	2	(Brazilian Football Confederation) Corinthians
22	DF	Daniela Caracas	25 April 1997 (aged 25)	17	0	(Royal Spanish Football Federation) Espanyol
23	FW	Elexa Bahr	26 May 1998 (aged 24)	3	0	(Royal Spanish Football Federation) CDE Racing

=== Ecuador ===
The squad was announced on 30 June 2022.

Head coach: (Portugal) Emily Lima

No.	Pos.	Player	Date of birth (age)	Club
1	GK	Andrea Vera	10 April 1993 (aged 29)	(Ecuadorian Football Federation) Club Ñañas
2	DF	Suany Fajardo	24 February 1994 (aged 28)	(Ecuadorian Football Federation) Barcelona S.C.
3	DF	Ariana Lomas	17 January 2002 (aged 20)	(Ecuadorian Football Federation) Independiente del Valle
4	MF	Stefany Cedeño	6 August 2000 (aged 21)	(Ecuadorian Football Federation) Barcelona S.C.
5	DF	Ericka Gracia	7 August 1989 (aged 32)	(Ecuadorian Football Federation) Independiente del Valle
6	MF	Manoly Baquerizo	15 December 1998 (aged 23)	(Royal Spanish Football Federation) Cacereño
7	FW	Emily Arias	16 March 2003 (aged 19)	(Ecuadorian Football Federation) Independiente del Valle
8	MF	Marthina Aguirre	25 January 2001 (aged 21)	(United States Soccer Federation) High Point Panthers
9	FW	Nayely Bolaños	25 February 2003 (aged 19)	(Ecuadorian Football Federation) Independiente del Valle
10	FW	Karen Flores	24 July 2001 (aged 20)	(United States Soccer Federation) Cal State Bakersfield Roadrunners
11	MF	Ámbar Torres	21 December 1994 (aged 27)	(Ecuadorian Football Federation) Club Ñañas
12	GK	Andrea Morán	14 October 1999 (aged 22)	(Ecuadorian Football Federation) Independiente del Valle
13	FW	Nicole Charcopa	1 April 2000 (aged 22)	(Ecuadorian Football Federation) Independiente del Valle
14	DF	Danna Pesántez	29 August 2003 (aged 18)	(Ecuadorian Football Federation) Carneras UPS
15	FW	Isabel Trujillo	17 November 1999 (aged 22)	(Ecuadorian Football Federation) LDU Quito
16	DF	Ligia Moreira (captain)	19 March 1992 (aged 30)	(Royal Spanish Football Federation) Córdoba
17	MF	Joselyn Espinales	19 January 1999 (aged 23)	(Ecuadorian Football Federation) LDU Quito
18	MF	Belén Aragón	26 March 1995 (aged 27)	(Ecuadorian Football Federation) LDU Quito
19	DF	Kerlly Real	7 November 1998 (aged 23)	(Royal Spanish Football Federation) Valencia
20	FW	Jimena Zambrano	19 July 2003 (aged 18)	(Ecuadorian Football Federation) LDU Quito
21	MF	Giannina Lattanzio	19 May 1993 (aged 29)	(Italian Football Federation) Cittadella
22	GK	Ivanna Macías	26 March 2003 (aged 19)	(Ecuadorian Football Federation) Leones del Norte
23	FW	Jael Montalvo	20 June 2005 (aged 17)	(Ecuadorian Football Federation) LDU Quito

=== Paraguay ===
The squad was announced on 21 June 2022.

Head coach: (Italy) Marcello Frigério

No.	Pos.	Player	Date of birth (age)	Club
1	GK	Cristina Recalde	29 March 1994 (aged 28)	(Royal Spanish Football Federation) Juan Grande
2	DF	Limpia Fretes	24 June 2000 (aged 22)	(Paraguayan Football Association) Libertad/Limpeño
3	DF	Lorena Alonso	1 April 1998 (aged 24)	(Colombian Football Federation) Millonarios
4	DF	Daysy Bareiro	19 January 2001 (aged 21)	(Royal Spanish Football Federation) Juan Grande
5	DF	Verónica Riveros (captain)	23 April 1987 (aged 35)	(Brazilian Football Confederation) São José
6	DF	Dulce Quintana	6 February 1989 (aged 33)	(Royal Spanish Football Federation) SE AEM
7	MF	Fabiola Sandoval	27 May 1999 (aged 23)	(Brazilian Football Confederation) Avaí
8	MF	Rosa Miño	13 July 1999 (aged 22)	(Portuguese Football Federation) Atlético Ouriense
9	MF	Lice Chamorro	22 December 1998 (aged 23)	(Royal Spanish Football Federation) Deportivo Alavés
10	FW	Jessica Martínez	14 June 1999 (aged 23)	(Royal Spanish Football Federation) Sevilla
11	MF	Fany Gauto	19 August 1992 (aged 29)	(Brazilian Football Confederation) Ferroviária
12	GK	Alicia Bobadilla	5 June 1994 (aged 28)	(Argentine Football Association) San Lorenzo
13	FW	Graciela Martínez	24 May 2001 (aged 21)	(Brazilian Football Confederation) Vasco da Gama
14	DF	Tania Riso	26 January 1994 (aged 28)	(Royal Spanish Football Federation) SE AEM
15	MF	Fanny Godoy	21 January 1998 (aged 24)	(Royal Spanish Football Federation) Juan Grande
16	MF	Ramona Martínez	21 July 1996 (aged 25)	(Paraguayan Football Association) Libertad/Limpeño
17	FW	Gloria Villamayor	10 April 1992 (aged 30)	(Royal Spanish Football Federation) SE AEM
18	MF	Camila Arrieta	16 September 2001 (aged 20)	(Brazilian Football Confederation) Avaí
19	FW	Rebeca Fernández	1 December 1991 (aged 30)	(Football Federation of Chile) Universidad de Chile
20	MF	Lourdes González	16 July 1999 (aged 22)	(Paraguayan Football Association) Cerro Porteño
21	DF	María Martínez	24 May 1999 (aged 23)	(Paraguayan Football Association) Libertad/Limpeño
22	GK	Gloria Saleb	12 June 1991 (aged 31)	(Paraguayan Football Association) Olimpia
23	MF	Fátima Acosta	7 January 2005 (aged 17)	(Paraguayan Football Association) Resistencia

== Group B ==
=== Argentina ===
The squad was announced on 27 June 2022. On 6 July, Marianela Szymanowski withdrew due to injury and was replaced by Érica Lonigro.

Head coach: Germán Portanova

No.	Pos.	Player	Date of birth (age)	Club
1	GK	Vanina Correa (captain)	14 August 1983 (aged 38)	(Argentine Football Association) Rosario Central
2	DF	Agustina Barroso	20 May 1993 (aged 29)	(Brazilian Football Confederation) Palmeiras
3	DF	Eliana Stábile	26 November 1993 (aged 28)	(Brazilian Football Confederation) Santos
4	MF	Julieta Cruz	4 June 1996 (aged 26)	(Argentine Football Association) Boca Juniors
5	MF	Vanesa Santana	3 September 1990 (aged 31)	(Royal Spanish Football Federation) Sporting de Huelva
6	DF	Aldana Cometti	3 March 1996 (aged 26)	(Royal Spanish Football Federation) Levante
7	MF	Romina Núñez	1 January 1994 (aged 28)	(Argentine Football Association) UAI Urquiza
8	MF	Daiana Falfán	14 October 2000 (aged 21)	(Argentine Football Association) UAI Urquiza
9	FW	Sole Jaimes	20 January 1989 (aged 33)	(Italian Football Federation) Napoli
10	MF	Dalila Ippólito	24 March 2002 (aged 20)	(Italian Football Federation) Pomigliano
11	FW	Yamila Rodríguez	24 January 1998 (aged 24)	(Argentine Football Association) Boca Juniors
12	GK	Solana Pereyra	5 April 1999 (aged 23)	(Royal Spanish Football Federation) Real Unión
13	MF	Sophia Braun	26 January 2002 (aged 20)	(United States Soccer Federation) Gonzaga Bulldogs
14	MF	Miriam Mayorga	20 November 1989 (aged 32)	(Argentine Football Association) Boca Juniors
15	FW	Florencia Bonsegundo	14 July 1993 (aged 28)	(Royal Spanish Football Federation) Madrid CFF
16	DF	Marina Delgado	12 June 1995 (aged 27)	(Argentine Football Association) UAI Urquiza
17	MF	Maricel Pereyra	11 May 2002 (aged 20)	(Argentine Football Association) San Lorenzo
18	MF	Gabriela Chávez	9 April 1989 (aged 33)	(Argentine Football Association) Estudiantes (BA)
19	FW	Mariana Larroquette	24 October 1992 (aged 29)	(Portuguese Football Federation) Sporting CP
20	MF	Ruth Bravo	6 March 1992 (aged 30)	(Mexican Football Federation) Pachuca
21	FW	Érica Lonigro	6 July 1994 (aged 28)	(Argentine Football Association) River Plate
22	FW	Estefanía Banini	21 June 1990 (aged 32)	(Royal Spanish Football Federation) Atlético Madrid
23	GK	Laurina Oliveros	10 September 1993 (aged 28)	(Argentine Football Association) Boca Juniors

=== Brazil ===
Top Brazilian goalscorer Marta was unable to play in the tournament due to recovering from a knee ligament injury. The final squad was announced prior to the tournament. Gabi Nunes and Letícia Izidoro withdrew due to injuries and were replaced by Duda Sampaio and Natascha.

Head coach: (Sweden) Pia Sundhage

No.	Pos.	Player	Date of birth (age)	Caps	Goals	Club
1	GK	Lorena	6 May 1997 (aged 25)	6	0	(Brazilian Football Confederation) Grêmio
2	DF	Letícia Santos	2 December 1994 (aged 27)	35	0	(German Football Association) Eintracht Frankfurt
3	DF	Kathellen	26 April 1996 (aged 26)	8	0	(Italian Football Federation) Internazionale
4	DF	Rafaelle	18 June 1991 (aged 31)	69	8	(The Football Association) Arsenal
5	MF	Duda Santos	24 March 1996 (aged 26)	4	0	(Brazilian Football Confederation) Palmeiras
6	DF	Tamires	10 October 1987 (aged 34)	122	5	(Brazilian Football Confederation) Corinthians
7	FW	Gabi Portilho	18 July 1995 (aged 26)	2	0	(Brazilian Football Confederation) Corinthians
8	MF	Angelina	26 January 2000 (aged 22)	14	1	(United States Soccer Federation) OL Reign
9	FW	Debinha	20 October 1991 (aged 30)	120	48	(United States Soccer Federation) North Carolina Courage
10	FW	Duda	18 July 1995 (aged 26)	17	1	(Brazilian Football Confederation) Flamengo
11	FW	Adriana	17 November 1996 (aged 25)	25	3	(Brazilian Football Confederation) Corinthians
12	GK	Natascha	27 September 1997 (aged 24)	1	0	(Brazilian Football Confederation) Flamengo
13	DF	Antônia	26 April 1994 (aged 28)	13	0	(Royal Spanish Football Federation) Madrid CFF
14	MF	Duda Sampaio	18 May 2001 (aged 21)	0	0	(Brazilian Football Confederation) Internacional
15	DF	Tainara	21 April 1999 (aged 23)	13	0	(French Football Federation) Bordeaux
16	FW	Bia Zaneratto	17 December 1993 (aged 28)	94	30	(Brazilian Football Confederation) Palmeiras
17	FW	Ary Borges	28 December 1999 (aged 22)	11	2	(Brazilian Football Confederation) Palmeiras
18	FW	Geyse	27 March 1998 (aged 24)	27	4	(Royal Spanish Football Federation) Madrid CFF
19	FW	Gio	21 June 2003 (aged 19)	10	2	(Royal Spanish Football Federation) Levante
20	DF	Fe Palermo	18 August 1996 (aged 25)	5	0	(Brazilian Football Confederation) São Paulo
21	FW	Kerolin	17 November 1999 (aged 22)	15	5	(United States Soccer Federation) North Carolina Courage
22	GK	Luciana	24 July 1987 (aged 34)	37	0	(Brazilian Football Confederation) Ferroviária
23	MF	Luana	2 May 1993 (aged 29)	20	1	(French Football Federation) Paris Saint-Germain

=== Peru ===
The squad was announced prior to the tournament.

Head coach: Conrad Flores

No.	Pos.	Player	Date of birth (age)	Club
1	GK	Silvana Alfaro	6 October 2001 (aged 20)	(Argentine Football Association) Racing
2	DF	Stephannie Vásquez	24 June 1994 (aged 28)	(Peruvian Football Federation) Universitario
3	DF	Grace Cagnina	8 May 2001 (aged 21)	(United States Soccer Federation) LIU Sharks
4	DF	Braelynn Llamoca	30 January 2002 (aged 20)	(United States Soccer Federation) UC Riverside Highlanders
5	MF	Teresa Wowk	10 January 2002 (aged 20)	(United States Soccer Federation) Kennesaw State Owls
6	MF	Claudia Cagnina	10 September 1997 (aged 24)	(Swedish Football Association) Sandvikens IF
7	MF	Sandy Dorador	4 January 1989 (aged 33)	(Peruvian Football Federation) Alianza Lima
8	MF	Ariana Muñoz	1 May 2000 (aged 22)	(United States Soccer Federation) North Florida Ospreys
9	FW	Alexandra Kimball	21 September 1995 (aged 26)	(United States Soccer Federation) North Carolina Courage
10	MF	Sandra Arévalo	14 April 1998 (aged 24)	(Peruvian Football Federation) Alianza Lima
11	FW	Xioczana Canales	21 April 1999 (aged 23)	(Peruvian Football Federation) Universitario
12	GK	Maryory Sánchez	7 April 1997 (aged 25)	(Colombian Football Federation) Millonarios
13	DF	Yoselin Miranda	14 December 1994 (aged 27)	(Peruvian Football Federation) Alianza Lima
14	DF	Scarleth Flores	12 August 1996 (aged 25)	(Peruvian Football Federation) Universitario
15	MF	Emily Flores	10 September 1990 (aged 31)	(Peruvian Football Federation) César Vallejo
16	FW	Liliana Neyra	22 June 1993 (aged 29)	(Portuguese Football Federation) Amora
17	DF	Fabiola Herrera (captain)	18 June 1987 (aged 35)	(Peruvian Football Federation) Universitario
18	FW	Pierina Núñez	13 March 2000 (aged 22)	(Royal Spanish Football Federation) Betis B
19	FW	Nahomi Martínez	5 April 1997 (aged 25)	(Peruvian Football Federation) Universitario
20	MF	Claudia Domínguez	17 May 2003 (aged 19)	(Royal Spanish Football Federation) Atlético Madrid B
21	GK	Mía Shalit	3 July 2002 (aged 20)	(United States Soccer Federation) Sacramento State Hornets
22	MF	Cindy Novoa	10 August 1995 (aged 26)	(Peruvian Football Federation) Universitario
23	FW	Steffani Otiniano	7 August 1992 (aged 29)	(Peruvian Football Federation) Alianza Lima

=== Uruguay ===
The squad was announced on 26 June 2022. On 2 July 2022, Antonella Ferradans withdrew due to injury and was replaced by Pilar González.

Head coach: Ariel Longo

No.	Pos.	Player	Date of birth (age)	Club
1	GK	Josefina Villanueva	3 February 2000 (aged 22)	(Uruguayan Football Association) Nacional
2	DF	Stephanie Lacoste	9 September 1996 (aged 25)	(Royal Spanish Football Federation) Real Oviedo
3	DF	Daiana Farías	26 January 1999 (aged 23)	(Portuguese Football Federation) Racing Power
4	DF	Carina Felipe	3 March 1998 (aged 24)	(Argentine Football Association) River Plate
5	MF	Karol Bermúdez	18 April 2001 (aged 21)	(Brazilian Football Confederation) Atlético Mineiro
6	FW	Sindy Ramírez	28 January 1991 (aged 31)	(Argentine Football Association) San Lorenzo
7	DF	Stephanie Tregartten	13 October 1997 (aged 24)	(Uruguayan Football Association) Ceibal
8	MF	Ximena Velazco	31 July 1995 (aged 26)	(Uruguayan Football Association) Peñarol
9	MF	Pamela González	28 August 1995 (aged 26)	(Royal Spanish Football Federation) Granada
10	FW	Carolina Birizamberri	9 July 1995 (aged 26)	(Argentine Football Association) River Plate
11	FW	Esperanza Pizarro	15 April 2001 (aged 21)	(Royal Spanish Football Federation) Santa Teresa
12	GK	Vanina Sburlati	3 August 2003 (aged 18)	(Uruguayan Football Association) Peñarol
13	GK	Sofía Olivera	14 August 1991 (aged 30)	(Argentine Football Association) UAI Urquiza
14	DF	Pilar González	29 June 2002 (aged 20)	(Uruguayan Football Association) Peñarol
15	MF	Rocío Martínez	4 September 2001 (aged 20)	(Uruguayan Football Association) Nacional
16	DF	Lorena González	24 April 1989 (aged 33)	(Brazilian Football Confederation) Grêmio
17	MF	Cecilia Gómez	7 September 2001 (aged 20)	(Uruguayan Football Association) Nacional
18	MF	Mariana Pion	19 December 1992 (aged 29)	(Paraguayan Football Association) Libertad/Limpeño
19	FW	Wendy Carballo	28 July 2002 (aged 19)	(Uruguayan Football Association) Peñarol
20	MF	Luciana Gómez	28 July 2000 (aged 21)	(Brazilian Football Confederation) Atlético Mineiro
21	FW	Belén Aquino	1 February 2002 (aged 20)	(Uruguayan Football Association) Peñarol
22	DF	Sofía Ramondegui	26 March 2001 (aged 21)	(Uruguayan Football Association) Peñarol
23	MF	Zulma Daer	8 November 1995 (aged 26)	(Uruguayan Football Association) Cerro Largo

=== Venezuela ===
The squad was announced on 6 July 2022.

Head coach: (Italy) Pamela Conti

No.	Pos.	Player	Date of birth (age)	Club
1	GK	Yéssica Velásquez	28 July 1989 (aged 32)	(Colombian Football Federation) Santa Fe
2	DF	Verónica Herrera	14 January 2000 (aged 22)	(Royal Spanish Football Federation) Tenerife
3	DF	Nairelis Gutiérrez	2 July 1995 (aged 27)	(Colombian Football Federation) Santa Fe
4	DF	María Peraza	17 January 1994 (aged 28)	(Colombian Football Federation) Atlético Nacional
5	DF	Yenifer Giménez	3 May 1996 (aged 26)	(Royal Spanish Football Federation) Villarreal
6	DF	Michelle Romero	12 June 1997 (aged 25)	(Royal Spanish Football Federation) Sporting Gijón
7	MF	Paola Villamizar	30 June 1994 (aged 28)	(Mexican Football Federation) Tijuana
8	MF	Sonia O'Neill	19 August 1994 (aged 27)	(Croatian Football Federation) Split
9	FW	Deyna Castellanos (captain)	18 April 1999 (aged 23)	(Royal Spanish Football Federation) Atlético Madrid
10	MF	Kika Moreno	25 January 1997 (aged 25)	(Royal Spanish Football Federation) Dux Logroño
11	FW	Oriana Altuve	3 October 1992 (aged 29)	(Royal Spanish Football Federation) Valencia
12	DF	Sabrina Araujo-Elorza	11 May 2004 (aged 18)	(United States Soccer Federation) Northeastern Huskies
13	GK	Nayluisa Cáceres	18 November 1999 (aged 22)	(Royal Spanish Football Federation) Tenerife
14	MF	Raiderlin Carrasco	11 June 2002 (aged 20)	(Venezuelan Football Federation) Caracas
15	MF	Yusmery Ascanio	20 December 1990 (aged 31)	(Football Federation of Chile) Colo-Colo
16	MF	Gabriela García	2 April 1997 (aged 25)	(Royal Spanish Football Federation) Real Sociedad
17	MF	Maikerlin Astudillo	10 May 1992 (aged 30)	(Royal Spanish Football Federation) SE AEM
18	FW	Ysaura Viso	17 June 1993 (aged 29)	(Football Federation of Chile) Colo-Colo
19	FW	Mariana Speckmaier	26 December 1997 (aged 24)	(Football Association of Iceland) Valur
20	MF	Dayana Rodríguez	20 October 2001 (aged 20)	(Brazilian Football Confederation) Atlético Mineiro
21	MF	Bárbara Olivieri	24 February 2002 (aged 20)	(Mexican Football Federation) Monterrey
22	GK	Andrea Fernanda Tovar	22 August 1990 (aged 31)	(Royal Spanish Football Federation) Getafe
23	DF	Gabriela Angulo	27 February 2004 (aged 18)	(Venezuelan Football Federation) Deportivo La Guaira

== Player representation ==
=== By club ===
Clubs with 5 or more players represented are listed.

Players	Club
8	(Chile) Colo-Colo
6	(Ecuador) Independiente del Valle, (Peru) Universitario, (Uruguay) Peñarol
5	Santiago Morning, Universidad de Chile, (Ecuador) LDU Quito

=== By club nationality ===
Players	Clubs
51	Spain
25	Brazil
18	Bolivia, Chile
17	Argentina, Ecuador
15	Colombia
14	United States
11	Peru, Uruguay
7	Paraguay
4	Italy, Mexico, Portugal
3	France
2	Venezuela
1	Australia, Croatia, England, Germany, Iceland, Israel, Sweden

=== By club federation ===
Players	Federation
141	CONMEBOL
68	UEFA
18	CONCACAF
1	AFC

=== By representatives of domestic league ===
National squad	Players
Bolivia	18
Ecuador	17
Chile	15
Brazil	12
Argentina	11
Peru	11
Uruguay	11
Colombia	10
Paraguay	6
Venezuela	2
