= 2018 South American U-20 Women's Championship =

8th edition of the South American Under-20 Women's Football Championship

2018 South American Under-20 Women's Football Championship
CONMEBOL Sudamericano Femenino Sub-20 Ecuador 2018
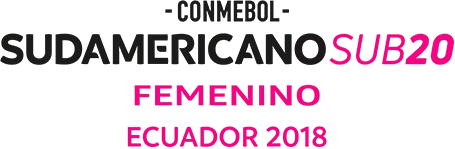

Tournament details
- Host country: Ecuador
- Dates: 13–31 January
- Teams: 10 (from 1 confederation)
- Venue: 3 (in 3 host cities)

Final positions
- Champions: Brazil (8th title)
- Runners-up: Paraguay
- Third place: Colombia
- Fourth place: Venezuela

Tournament statistics
- Matches played: 26
- Goals scored: 103 (3.96 per match)
- Top scorer: (Brazil) Geyse (12 goals)
- Fair play award: Brazil

The 2018 South American Under-20 Women's Football Championship was the eighth edition of the South American Under-20 Women's Football Championship (Spanish: CONMEBOL Sudamericano Femenino Sub-20), the biennial international youth football championship organised by CONMEBOL for the women's under-20 national teams of South America. The tournament was held in Ecuador between 13 and 31 January 2018.

The top two teams of the tournament qualified for the 2018 FIFA U-20 Women's World Cup in France as the CONMEBOL representatives.

Brazil were crowned champions and maintained their streak of winning all eight editions so far.

== Teams ==
All ten CONMEBOL member national teams are eligible to enter the tournament.

Team	Appearance	Previous best top-4 performance
Argentina	8th	Runners-up (2006, 2008, 2012)
Bolivia	8th	Fourth place (2004, 2014)
Brazil (holders)	8th	Champions (2004, 2006, 2008, 2010, 2012, 2014, 2015)
Chile	8th	Fourth place (2008, 2010)
Colombia	8th	Runners-up (2010)
Ecuador (hosts)	8th	Third place (2004)
Paraguay	8th	Runners-up (2004, 2014)
Peru	8th	Fourth place (2006)
Uruguay	8th	None
Venezuela	8th	Runners-up (2015)

== Venues ==
The matches were played in three venues in three cities.

- Estadio Bellavista, Ambato
- Estadio Olímpico de Ibarra, Ibarra
- Estadio Olímpico de Riobamba, Riobamba

== Draw ==
The draw of the tournament was held on 14 December 2017, 19:00 ECT (UTC−5), at the Casa de la Selección in Quito. The ten teams were drawn into two groups of five teams. The hosts Ecuador and the defending champions Brazil were seeded into Groups A and B respectively, while the remaining teams were placed into four "pairing pots" according to their results in the 2015 South American Under-20 Women's Football Championship: Venezuela–Colombia, Argentina–Chile, Paraguay–Uruguay, Bolivia–Peru.

== Squads ==
Players born on or after 1 January 1998 are eligible to compete in the tournament. Each team could register a maximum of 22 players (three of whom must be goalkeepers).

== Match officials ==
A total of 10 referees, 20 assistant referees, and two support referees were selected for the tournament.

== First stage ==
In the first stage, the teams are ranked according to points (3 points for a win, 1 point for a draw, 0 points for a loss). If tied on points, tiebreakers are applied in the following order (Regulations Article 18.1):

1. Goal difference;
2. Goals scored;
3. Head-to-head result in games between tied teams;
4. Drawing of lots.

The top two teams of each group advance to the final stage.

All times are local, ECT (UTC−5).

=== Group A ===
Pos	Team	Pld	W	D	L	GF	GA	GD	Pts	Qualification
1	Paraguay	4	4	0	0	15	2	+13	12	Final stage
2	Colombia	4	3	0	1	17	8	+9	9	Final stage
3	Ecuador (H)	4	1	0	3	4	8	−4	3	
4	Argentina	4	1	0	3	4	9	−5	3	
5	Peru	4	1	0	3	3	16	−13	3	

Source: CONMEBOL
(H) Hosts
13 January 2018
17:00

Colombia	1–6	Paraguay
Castañeda 19'	Report	Martínez 21', 32', 58', 90'; Miño 84'; Sandoval 88'

Estadio Olímpico de Riobamba, Riobamba
Referee: Emikar Calderas (Venezuela)
13 January 2018
19:15

Ecuador	1–2	Argentina
Espinales 16'	Report	Berardo 10', 44'

Estadio Olímpico de Riobamba, Riobamba
Referee: Dione Rissios (Chile)

15 January 2018
17:00

Argentina	1–2	Peru
Morcillo 8'	Report	Arévalo 10'; Paredes 28'

Estadio Olímpico de Riobamba, Riobamba
Referee: Nadia Fuques (Uruguay)
15 January 2018
19:15

Ecuador	1–4	Colombia
Cuadra 73'	Report	Pérez 3'; Acuña 18', 63'; Castañeda 68'

Estadio Olímpico de Riobamba, Riobamba
Referee: Sirley Cornejo (Bolivia)

17 January 2018
17:00

Colombia	9–0	Peru
Castañeda 9', 30', 50', 57'; Pérez 12'; Acuña 17'; Vanegas 23'; Acosta 78'; Barreto 84'	Report

Estadio Olímpico de Riobamba, Riobamba
Referee: Rejane Caetano (Brazil)
17 January 2018
19:15

Ecuador	0–2	Paraguay
	Report	Sandoval 28'; Chamorro 44'

Estadio Olímpico de Riobamba, Riobamba
Referee: Nadia Fuques (Uruguay)

19 January 2018
17:00

Paraguay	4–1	Peru
Martínez 52', 57'; Godoy 62', 70'	Report	Espino 86'

Estadio Olímpico de Riobamba, Riobamba
Referee: Dione Rissios (Chile)
19 January 2018
19:15

Colombia	3–1	Argentina
Castañeda 42', 89'; Rivas 81'	Report	Berardo 65'

Estadio Olímpico de Riobamba, Riobamba
Referee: Emikar Calderas (Venezuela)

21 January 2018
17:00

Argentina	0–3	Paraguay
	Report	Sandoval 19'; Martínez 24'; Bogarín 61'

Estadio Olímpico de Riobamba, Riobamba
Referee: Rejane Caetano (Brazil)
21 January 2018
19:15

Peru	0–2	Ecuador
	Report	Aguirre 19'; Espinoza 65'

Estadio Olímpico de Riobamba, Riobamba
Referee: Sirley Cornejo (Bolivia)

=== Group B ===
Pos	Team	Pld	W	D	L	GF	GA	GD	Pts	Qualification
1	Brazil	4	4	0	0	13	0	+13	12	Final stage
2	Venezuela	4	2	1	1	3	3	0	7	Final stage
3	Chile	4	2	0	2	9	4	+5	6	
4	Uruguay	4	1	0	3	3	9	−6	3	
5	Bolivia	4	0	1	3	2	14	−12	1	

Source: CONMEBOL
14 January 2018
17:00

Venezuela	1–0	Uruguay
Castellanos 45+2'	Report

Estadio Olímpico de Ibarra, Ibarra
Referee: María Daza (Colombia)
14 January 2018
19:15

Brazil	3–0	Chile
Thais Reiss 8'; Brenda 18'; Kerolin 33'	Report

Estadio Olímpico de Ibarra, Ibarra
Referee: Zulma Quiñónez (Paraguay)

16 January 2018
17:00

Chile	5–0	Bolivia
Grez 19'; Balmaceda 61'; Vásquez 63', 69'; Olave 88'	Report

Estadio Olímpico de Ibarra, Ibarra
Referee: Priscila Vásquez (Peru)
16 January 2018
19:15

Brazil	2–0	Venezuela
Geyse 50', 60'	Report

Estadio Olímpico de Ibarra, Ibarra
Referee: Salomé di Iorio (Argentina)

18 January 2018
17:00

Venezuela	1–1	Bolivia
Castellanos 29'	Report	Cruz 11'

Estadio Olímpico de Ibarra, Ibarra
Referee: Zulma Quiñónez (Paraguay)
18 January 2018
19:15

Brazil	3–0	Uruguay
Geyse 70', 79'; Valéria 76'	Report

Estadio Olímpico de Ibarra, Ibarra
Referee: María Cornejo (Ecuador)

20 January 2018
17:00

Uruguay	3–1	Bolivia
Pizarro 12', 70'; Bermúdez 88'	Report	Andía 38'

Estadio Olímpico de Ibarra, Ibarra
Referee: María Daza (Colombia)
20 January 2018
19:15

Venezuela	1–0	Chile
Castellanos 9'	Report

Estadio Olímpico de Ibarra, Ibarra
Referee: María Cornejo (Ecuador)

22 January 2018
17:00

Chile	4–0	Uruguay
Vásquez 34'; Olave 43'; Grez 61'; Jiménez 90+2'	Report

Estadio Olímpico de Ibarra, Ibarra
Referee: Priscila Vásquez (Peru)
22 January 2018
19:15

Bolivia	0–5	Brazil
	Report	Ariadina 6'; Andrada 31' (o.g.); Victória 34'; Isabella 46'; Juliana 61'

Estadio Olímpico de Ibarra, Ibarra
Referee: Salomé di Iorio (Argentina)

== Final stage ==
In the final stage, the teams are ranked according to points (3 points for a win, 1 point for a draw, 0 points for a loss). If tied on points, tiebreakers are applied in the following order, taking into account only matches in the final stage (Regulations Article 18.2):

1. Goal difference;
2. Goals scored;
3. Head-to-head result in games between tied teams;
4. Fair play points (first yellow card: minus 1 point; second yellow card / red card: minus 3 points; direct red card: minus 4 points; yellow card and direct red card: minus 5 points);
5. Drawing of lots.

Pos	Team	Pld	W	D	L	GF	GA	GD	Pts	Qualification
1	Brazil	3	3	0	0	17	1	+16	9	2018 FIFA U-20 Women's World Cup
2	Paraguay	3	2	0	1	8	11	−3	6	2018 FIFA U-20 Women's World Cup
3	Colombia	3	1	0	2	4	8	−4	3	
4	Venezuela	3	0	0	3	1	10	−9	0	

Source: CONMEBOL
25 January 2018
17:00

Paraguay	3–1	Venezuela
Sandoval 34'; Sánchez 38'; Chamorro 44'	Report	Castellanos 66'

Estadio Bellavista, Ambato
Referee: Salomé di Iorio (Argentina)
25 January 2018
19:15

Brazil	4–0	Colombia
Isabella 40'; Kerolin 45'; Brenda 51'; Geyse 70'	Report

Estadio Bellavista, Ambato
Referee: Dione Rissios (Chile)

28 January 2018
17:00

Brazil	5–0	Venezuela
Geyse 1', 73'; Ana Vitória 38'; Kerolin 86'; Brenda 89'	Report

Estadio Bellavista, Ambato
Referee: Sirley Cornejo (Bolivia)
28 January 2018
19:15

Paraguay	4–2	Colombia
Godoy 5' (pen.); Chamorro 61'; Bogarín 72'; Sandoval 81'	Report	Córdoba 27', 85'

Estadio Bellavista, Ambato
Referee: Nadia Fuques (Uruguay)

31 January 2018
17:00

Colombia	2–0	Venezuela
Castañeda 13', 72'	Report

Estadio Bellavista, Ambato
Referee: Priscila Vásquez (Peru)
31 January 2018
19:15

Paraguay	1–8	Brazil
Chamorro 80'	Report	Geyse 6', 42', 57', 78', 90+1'; Ana Vitória 17'; Brenda 82'; Valéria 88'

Estadio Bellavista, Ambato
Referee: Salomé di Iorio (Argentina)

== Winners ==
2018 South American Under-20 Women's Football Championship

Brazil
Eighth title

== Qualified teams for FIFA U-20 Women's World Cup ==
The following two teams from CONMEBOL qualified for the 2018 FIFA U-20 Women's World Cup.

Team	Qualified on	Previous appearances in FIFA U-20 Women's World Cup^{1}
Brazil	28 January 2018	8 (2002, 2004, 2006, 2008, 2010, 2012, 2014, 2016)
Paraguay	28 January 2018	1 (2014)

^{1} Bold indicates champions for that year. Italic indicates hosts for that year.

== Goalscorers ==
12 goals

- (Brazil) Geyse

10 goals

- (Colombia) Angie Castañeda

7 goals

- (Paraguay) Jessica Martínez

5 goals

- (Paraguay) Fabiola Sandoval

4 goals

- (Brazil) Brenda
- (Paraguay) Lice Chamorro
- (Venezuela) Deyna Castellanos

3 goals

- (Argentina) Juliana Berardo
- (Brazil) Kerolin
- (Chile) Ignacia Vásquez
- (Colombia) Natalia Acuña
- (Paraguay) Fanny Godoy

2 goals

- (Brazil) Ana Vitória
- (Brazil) Isabella
- (Brazil) Valéria
- (Chile) Javiera Grez
- (Chile) Isidora Olave
- (Colombia) Nelly Córdoba
- (Colombia) Maireth Pérez
- (Paraguay) Dahiana Bogarín
- (Uruguay) Esperanza Pizarro

1 goal

- (Argentina) Justina Morcillo
- (Brazil) Ariadina
- (Brazil) Juliana
- (Brazil) Thais Reiss
- (Brazil) Victória
- (Bolivia) Ana Paola Andia
- (Bolivia) Leonela Cruz
- (Chile) Rosario Balmaceda
- (Chile) Yastin Jiménez
- (Colombia) Vivian Acosta
- (Colombia) Laura Barreto
- (Colombia) Melissa Rivas
- (Colombia) Manuela Vanegas
- (Ecuador) Marthina Aguirre
- (Ecuador) Justin Cuadra
- (Ecuador) Josselyn Espinales
- (Ecuador) Luisa Espinoza
- (Paraguay) Rosa Miño
- (Paraguay) Jessica Sánchez
- (Peru) Sandra Arévalo
- (Peru) Esthefany Espino
- (Peru) Michelle Paredes
- (Uruguay) Karol Bermúdez

1 own goal

- (Bolivia) Martha Andrada (playing against Brazil)
