= Esthefany Espino =

Peruvian footballer (born 1999)

Personal information
- Full name: Esthefany Lizeth Espino Paredes
- Date of birth: 16 August 1999 (age 27)
- Place of birth: Ica, Peru
- Height: 1.58 m (5 ft 2 in)
- Position: Defensive midfielder

Team information
- Current team: Universitario

Senior career*
Years	Team	Apps	(Gls)
- Universitario

International career^{‡}
2016	Peru U17	?	(0)
2015–2018	Peru U20	1+	(1)
2018–	Peru	7	(0)
- * Club domestic league appearances and goals ‡ National team caps and goals as of 6 August 2019

Esthefany Lizeth Espino Paredes (born 16 August 1999) is a Peruvian footballer who plays as a defensive midfielder for Club Universitario de Deportes and the Peru women's national team.

== International career ==
Espino represented Peru at the 2016 South American U-17 Women's Championship and two South American U-20 Women's Championship editions (2015 and 2018). At senior level, she played the 2018 Copa América Femenina and the 2019 Pan American Games.
