= 2016 South American U-17 Women's Championship =

2016 South American Under-17 Women's Football Championship
Sudamericano Femenino Sub 17 Venezuela 2016

Tournament details
- Host country: Venezuela
- City: Barquisimeto
- Dates: 1–20 March
- Teams: 10 (from 1 confederation)
- Venue: 1 (in 1 host city)

Final positions
- Champions: Venezuela (2nd title)
- Runners-up: Brazil
- Third place: Paraguay
- Fourth place: Colombia

Tournament statistics
- Matches played: 26
- Goals scored: 81 (3.12 per match)
- Top scorer: (Venezuela) Deyna Castellanos (12 goals)

The 2016 South American Under-17 Women's Football Championship was the fifth edition of the South American Under-17 Women's Football Championship, the biennial international youth football championship organised by the CONMEBOL for the women's under-17 national teams of South America. The tournament was held in Barquisimeto, Venezuela between 1 and 20 March 2016.

Same as previous editions, the tournament acted as the CONMEBOL qualifiers for the FIFA U-17 Women's World Cup. The top three teams of the tournament qualified for the 2016 FIFA U-17 Women's World Cup in Jordan as the CONMEBOL representatives.

Venezuela were crowned champions for the second consecutive tournament, and qualified for the World Cup together with runners-up Brazil and third place Paraguay.

== Teams ==
All ten CONMEBOL member national teams entered the tournament.

Team	Appearance	Previous best top-4 performance
Argentina	5th	Fourth place (2008, 2012)
Bolivia	5th	None
Brazil	5th	Champions (2010, 2012)
Chile	5th	Runners-up (2010)
Colombia	5th	Champions (2008)
Ecuador	5th	None
Paraguay	5th	Third place (2008, 2013)
Peru	5th	None
Uruguay	5th	Runners-up (2012)
Venezuela	5th	Champions (2013)

== Venues ==
The tournament was played in Barquisimeto. The stadium was Deportivo Lara's Estadio Metropolitano de Fútbol de Lara.

== Squads ==
Players born on or after 1 January 1999 were eligible to compete in the tournament. Each team could register a maximum of 22 players (three of whom must be goalkeepers).

== First stage ==
The draw of the tournament was held on 27 January 2016 at the CONMEBOL Headquarters in Luque, Paraguay. The ten teams were drawn into two groups of five teams. Each group contained one team from each of the five "pairing pots": Venezuela–Brazil, Colombia–Paraguay, Argentina–Uruguay, Bolivia–Chile, Ecuador–Peru. The schedule of the tournament was announced on 18 February 2016.

The top two teams of each group advanced to the final stage. The teams were ranked according to points (3 points for a win, 1 point for a draw, 0 points for a loss). If tied on points, tiebreakers would be applied in the following order:

1. Goal difference in all games;
2. Goals scored in all games;
3. Head-to-head result in games between tied teams;
4. Penalty shoot-out if only two teams are tied on points and they are playing last game of the group
5. Drawing of lots.

All times were local, VET (UTC−4:30).

=== Group A ===
Pos	Team	Pld	W	D	L	GF	GA	GD	Pts	Qualification
1	Venezuela (H)	4	4	0	0	16	1	+15	12	Final stage
2	Paraguay	4	3	0	1	13	5	+8	9	Final stage
3	Chile	4	1	1	2	5	6	−1	4	
4	Peru	4	1	0	3	2	16	−14	3	
5	Argentina	4	0	1	3	2	10	−8	1	

Source: CONMEBOL
(H) Hosts
1 March 2016
09:00

Paraguay	3–0	Chile
J. Martínez 30', 65'; Sánchez 69'	Report

Estadio Metropolitano de Fútbol de Lara, Barquisimeto
Referee: María Cornejo (Ecuador)
1 March 2016
11:15

Venezuela	3–0	Argentina
Castellanos 22', 32'; Luzardo 65'	Report

Estadio Metropolitano de Fútbol de Lara, Barquisimeto
Referee: Edina Batista (Brazil)

3 March 2016
09:00

Argentina	1–1	Chile
Muñoz 90'	Report	Balmaceda 21'

Estadio Metropolitano de Fútbol de Lara, Barquisimeto
Referee: Johana Haro (Ecuador)
3 March 2016
11:15

Venezuela	8–0	Peru
Castellanos 24', 48' (pen.), 51'; Rodríguez 28', 33', 56'; Cabeza 45'; Castillo 52'	Report

Estadio Metropolitano de Fútbol de Lara, Barquisimeto
Referee: Janette Vera (Bolivia)

5 March 2016
09:00

Paraguay	4–1	Peru
J. Martínez 55' (pen.), 69', 83' (pen.); Bogarín 57'	Report	Canales 48'

Estadio Metropolitano de Fútbol de Lara, Barquisimeto
5 March 2016
11:15

Venezuela	2–0	Chile
Castellanos 6'; Moreno 62'	Report

Estadio Metropolitano de Fútbol de Lara, Barquisimeto

7 March 2016
09:00

Chile	4–0	Peru
Rapimán 35'; Balmaceda 55'; Padrón 58', 81'	Report

Estadio Metropolitano de Fútbol de Lara, Barquisimeto
Referee: Johana Haro (Ecuador)
7 March 2016
11:15

Paraguay	5–1	Argentina
J. Martínez 9', 44' (pen.), 73'; K. Martínez 14', 41'	Report	Benítez 71'

Estadio Metropolitano de Fútbol de Lara, Barquisimeto
Referee: Edina Batista (Brazil)

9 March 2016
09:00

Argentina	0–1	Peru
	Report	Canales 10'

Estadio Metropolitano de Fútbol de Lara, Barquisimeto
Referee: Janette Vera (Bolivia)
9 March 2016
11:15

Venezuela	3–1	Paraguay
Rodríguez 7'; Moreno 55'; Castellanos 61'	Report	Sandoval 65'

Estadio Metropolitano de Fútbol de Lara, Barquisimeto
Referee: Viviana Muñoz (Colombia)

=== Group B ===
Pos	Team	Pld	W	D	L	GF	GA	GD	Pts	Qualification
1	Brazil	4	3	1	0	12	4	+8	10	Final stage
2	Colombia	4	2	1	1	4	1	+3	7	Final stage
3	Uruguay	4	2	1	1	5	5	0	7	
4	Ecuador	4	1	1	2	3	6	−3	4	
5	Bolivia	4	0	0	4	0	8	−8	0	

Source: CONMEBOL
2 March 2016
09:00

Colombia	1–0	Bolivia
Barreto 79' (pen.)	Report

Estadio Metropolitano de Fútbol de Lara, Barquisimeto
Referee: Isley Delgado (Venezuela)
2 March 2016
11:15

Brazil	5–3	Uruguay
Kerolin 13', 67'; Nycole 58', 62', 80'	Report	Yuvet 34'; Castel 42'; Morales 46' (pen.)

Estadio Metropolitano de Fútbol de Lara, Barquisimeto
Referee: Zulma Quiñónez (Paraguay)

4 March 2016
09:00

Uruguay	1–0	Bolivia
Morales 27' (pen.)	Report

Estadio Metropolitano de Fútbol de Lara, Barquisimeto
4 March 2016
11:15

Brazil	3–1	Ecuador
Nycole 40' (pen.); Thais 48'; Isabela 51'	Report	Caicedo 68'

Estadio Metropolitano de Fútbol de Lara, Barquisimeto

6 March 2016
09:00

Colombia	3–0	Ecuador
Pérez 10', 63'; Chirva 84'	Report

Estadio Metropolitano de Fútbol de Lara, Barquisimeto
6 March 2016
11:15

Brazil	4–0	Bolivia
Bianca 14', 34'; Ana Vitória 23'; Rayane 76'	Report

Estadio Metropolitano de Fútbol de Lara, Barquisimeto

8 March 2016
09:00

Bolivia	0–2	Ecuador
	Report	Rodríguez 55'; Trujillo 63'

Estadio Metropolitano de Fútbol de Lara, Barquisimeto
Referee: Isley Delgado (Venezuela)
8 March 2016
11:15

Colombia	0–1	Uruguay
	Report	García 88'

Estadio Metropolitano de Fútbol de Lara, Barquisimeto
Referee: Dione Rissios (Chile)

10 March 2016
09:00

Uruguay	0–0	Ecuador
	Report

Estadio Metropolitano de Fútbol de Lara, Barquisimeto
Referee: Elizabeth Tintaya (Peru)
10 March 2016
11:15

Brazil	0–0	Colombia
	Report

Estadio Metropolitano de Fútbol de Lara, Barquisimeto
Referee: Laura Fortunato (Argentina)

== Final stage ==
If teams finished level of points, the final order would be determined according to the same criteria as the first stage, taking into account only matches in the final stage. If there was a continuing tie between teams after applying criteria 1–4, the first stage results would be taken into account.

Pos	Team	Pld	W	D	L	GF	GA	GD	Pts	Qualification
1	Venezuela (H)	3	3	0	0	11	2	+9	9	2016 FIFA U-17 Women's World Cup
2	Brazil	3	2	0	1	3	1	+2	6	2016 FIFA U-17 Women's World Cup
3	Paraguay	3	1	0	2	4	8	−4	3	2016 FIFA U-17 Women's World Cup
4	Colombia	3	0	0	3	1	8	−7	0	

Source: CONMEBOL
(H) Hosts
14 March 2016
09:00

Brazil	1–0	Paraguay
Angelina 59'	Report

Estadio Metropolitano de Fútbol de Lara, Barquisimeto
Referee: Dione Rissios (Chile)
14 March 2016
11:15

Venezuela	4–0	Colombia
Castellanos 15'; Vanegas 19' (o.g.); Rodríguez 33', 66'	Report

Estadio Metropolitano de Fútbol de Lara, Barquisimeto
Referee: Janette Vera (Bolivia)

17 March 2016
09:00

Brazil	2–0	Colombia
Kerolin 23'; Nycole 76'	Report

Estadio Metropolitano de Fútbol de Lara, Barquisimeto
Referee: Elizabeth Tintaya (Peru)
17 March 2016
11:15

Venezuela	6–2	Paraguay
Moreno 21', 29'; Castellanos 27', 54' (pen.), 83'; Cabeza 86' (pen.)	Report	Bogarín 80'; Fretes 90+2'

Estadio Metropolitano de Fútbol de Lara, Barquisimeto
Referee: Johana Haro (Ecuador)

20 March 2016
09:00

Paraguay	2–1	Colombia
Martínez 33' (pen.), 38'	Report	Vanegas 18'

Estadio Metropolitano de Fútbol de Lara, Barquisimeto
Referee: María Laura Fortunato (Argentina)
20 March 2016
11:15

Venezuela	1–0	Brazil
Castellanos 47'	Report

Estadio Metropolitano de Fútbol de Lara, Barquisimeto
Attendance: 45,321
Referee: María Cornejo (Ecuador)

== Winners ==
2016 South American Under-17 Women's Football Championship

Venezuela
Second title

== Qualified teams for FIFA U-17 Women's World Cup ==
The following three teams from CONMEBOL qualified for the FIFA U-17 Women's World Cup.

Team	Qualified on	Previous appearances in tournament^{1}
Venezuela	17 March 2016	2 (2010, 2014)
Brazil	17 March 2016	3 (2008, 2010, 2012)
Paraguay	20 March 2016	2 (2008, 2014)

^{1} Bold indicates champion for that year. Italic indicates host for that year.

== Goalscorers ==
12 goals

- (Venezuela) Deyna Castellanos

10 goals

- (Paraguay) Jessica Martínez

6 goals

- (Venezuela) Daniuska Rodríguez

5 goals

- (Brazil) Nycole Silva

4 goals

- (Venezuela) Yerliane Moreno

3 goals

- (Brazil) Kerolin Nicoli

2 goals

- (Brazil) Bianca Ferrara
- (Chile) Rosario Balmaceda
- (Chile) Rachel Padrón
- (Colombia) Mairerth Pérez
- (Paraguay) Dahiana Bogarín
- (Paraguay) Katia Martínez
- (Peru) Xioczana Canales
- (Uruguay) Deyna Morales
- (Venezuela) Jeismar Cabeza

1 goal

- (Argentina) Luana Muñoz
- (Argentina) Magalí Benítez
- (Brazil) Ana Vitória Araújo
- (Brazil) Angelina Alonso
- (Brazil) Isabela da Silva
- (Brazil) Rayane Souza
- (Brazil) Thais da Silva
- (Chile) Camila Rapimán
- (Colombia) Laura Barreto
- (Colombia) Laura Chirva
- (Colombia) Manuela Vanegas
- (Ecuador) Carmen Caicedo
- (Ecuador) Doménica Rodríguez
- (Ecuador) Gladys Trujillo
- (Paraguay) Limpia Fretes
- (Paraguay) Fabiola Sandoval
- (Paraguay) Jessica Sánchez
- (Uruguay) Flavia Castel
- (Uruguay) Tamara García
- (Uruguay) Belén Yuvet
- (Venezuela) Olimar Castillo
- (Venezuela) Sandra Luzardo

Own goal

- (Colombia) Manuela Vanegas (playing against Venezuela)
