= Yerliane Moreno =

Venezuelan footballer (born 2000)

Personal information
- Full name: Yerliane Glamar Moreno Hernández
- Date of birth: 13 October 2000 (age 26)
- Place of birth: Guasdualito, Venezuela
- Height: 1.60 m (5 ft 3 in)
- Positions: Midfielder; forward

Team information
- Current team: UD Tenerife
- Number: 16

Senior career*
Years	Team	Apps	(Gls)
–2017	Zamora		
2018	Deportivo Táchira		
2019	Flor de Patria		
2019	Cúcuta Deportivo		
2020–	UD Tenerife	33	(0)

International career^{‡}
2016	Venezuela U17	8+	(5)
2018–2023	Venezuela	4	(0)
- * Club domestic league appearances and goals ‡ National team caps and goals as of 5 December 2023

Yerliane Glamar Moreno Hernández (born 13 October 2000) is a Venezuelan professional footballer who plays as a midfielder for Spanish Liga F club UD Tenerife and the Venezuela women's national team.

== International career ==
Moreno represented Venezuela at the 2016 South American U-17 Women's Championship and the 2016 FIFA U-17 Women's World Cup. At senior level, she played the 2018 Central American and Caribbean Games.
