= Xioczana Canales =

Peruvian footballer (born 1999)

Personal information
- Full name: Xioczana Milagros Canales Porras
- Date of birth: 21 April 1999 (age 27)
- Height: 1.65 m (5 ft 5 in)
- Positions: Midfielder; forward

Team information
- Current team: UCD La Cañada Atlético
- Number: 21

Senior career*
Years	Team	Apps	(Gls)
–2019	Sport Girls		
2020–	UCD La Cañada Atlético	2	(2)

International career^{‡}
2016	Peru U17	2+	(2)
2014–2017	Peru U20		
2014–	Peru	8	(0)
- * Club domestic league appearances and goals as of 19 January 2020 ‡ National team caps and goals as of 12 April 2018

Xioczana Milagros Canales Porras (born 21 April 1999) is a Peruvian footballer who plays as a midfielder for Spanish Primera Nacional club UCD La Cañada Atlético and the Peru women's national team.

== International career ==
Canales represented Peru at the 2014 South American U-20 Women's Championship, the 2016 South American U-17 Women's Championship and the 2017 Bolivarian Games. At senior level, she played Copa América Femenina (2014 and 2018).

== International goals ==
No.	Date	Venue	Opponent	Score	Result	Competition
1.	30 November 2021	Estadio Gunther Vogel, San Lorenzo, Paraguay	Paraguay	1–0	2–4	Friendly
