= Dahiana Bogarín =

Paraguayan footballer (born 2000)

Personal information
- Full name: Dahiana Monserrat Bogarín Giménez
- Date of birth: 13 November 2000 (age 26)
- Place of birth: Paraguay
- Height: 1.63 m (5 ft 4 in)
- Positions: Forward; central midfielder; defensive midfielder

Team information
- Current team: Colo-Colo
- Number: 26

Senior career*
Years	Team	Apps	(Gls)
- Cerro Porteño
2020–2021	Maccabi Kishronot Hadera	15	(4)
2021–2022	Olimpia		
2022–	Colo-Colo		

International career^{‡}
2016	Paraguay U17	5+	(2)
2018	Paraguay U20	4+	(2)
2019–	Paraguay	1	(0)
- * Club domestic league appearances and goals as of 23 May 2021 ‡ National team caps and goals as of 7 November 2019

Dahiana Monserrat Bogarín Giménez (born 13 November 2000) is a Paraguayan footballer who plays as a midfielder for Chilean club Colo-Colo and the Paraguay women's national team.

== Club career ==
In 2021–22, Bogarín played for Olimpia.

In May 2022, Bogarín moved abroad and signed with Chilean club Colo-Colo.

== International career ==
Bogarín has represented Paraguay at the 2016 South American U-17 Women's Championship, the 2016 FIFA U-17 Women's World Cup, the 2018 South American U-20 Women's Championship and the 2018 FIFA U-20 Women's World Cup. She made her senior debut on 7 November 2019, in a 1–2 home friendly loss to Argentina.

== International goals ==
No.	Date	Venue	Opponent	Score	Result	Competition
1.	25 October 2023	Estadio Sausalito, Viña del Mar, Chile	Jamaica	6–0	10–0	2023 Pan American Games

== Personal life ==
Bogarín has a brother, Rodrigo Bogarín, who has represented Paraguay at men's under–17 and under–20 levels.

== Honours ==
Cerro Porteño

- Paraguayan Championship (1): 2018

Olimpia

- Paraguayan Championship (1): 2022

Colo-Colo

- Chilean Primera División (5): 2022, 2023, 2024, 2025, 2026

Individual

- Chilean Primera División Ideal Team: 2024, 2025
