= Rosa Miño =

Paraguayan footballer (born 1999)

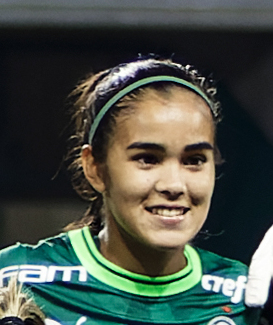

Personal information
- Full name: Rosa Mística Miño Martínez
- Date of birth: 13 July 1999 (age 27)
- Place of birth: Paraguay
- Height: 1.68 m (5 ft 6 in)
- Position: Attacking midfielder

Team information
- Current team: Palmeiras

Senior career*
Years	Team	Apps	(Gls)
–2018	Cerro Porteño		
2019	Foz Cataratas	2	(0)
2020	Famalicão	4	(0)
2020–2022	Atlético Ouriense	32	(2)
2022	ALG Spor	5	(0)
2023–	Palmeiras	0	(0)

International career^{‡}
2016	Paraguay U17	2	(0)
2018	Paraguay U20	9	(1)
2018–	Paraguay	8	(0)
- * Club domestic league appearances and goals as of 18 December 2022 ‡ National team caps and goals as of 7 November 2019

Rosa Mística Miño Martínez (born 13 July 1999) is a Paraguayan professional footballer who plays as a midfielder for Guerreras Albas (Liga Deportiva Universitaria) and the Paraguay women's national team.

== Club career ==
She played for the Portuguese club Atlético Ouriense.

After playing in Portugal, she moved to Turkey and signed with the Gaziantep-based league champion club ALG Spor on 15 August 2022. On 18 August 2022, she debuted in the 2022–23 UEFA Women's Champions League. After capping in five matches for >ALG Spor, she left Turkey on 29 December 2022. Previously, she has also played for the national women's under-17 and under-20 teams.

== International career ==
Miño represented Paraguay at the 2016 FIFA U-17 Women's World Cup, the 2018 South American U-20 Women's Championship and the 2018 FIFA U-20 Women's World Cup. At the senior level, she played the 2018 Copa América Femenina and the 2019 Pan American Games.
