= Rosario Balmaceda =

Chilean footballer (born 1999)

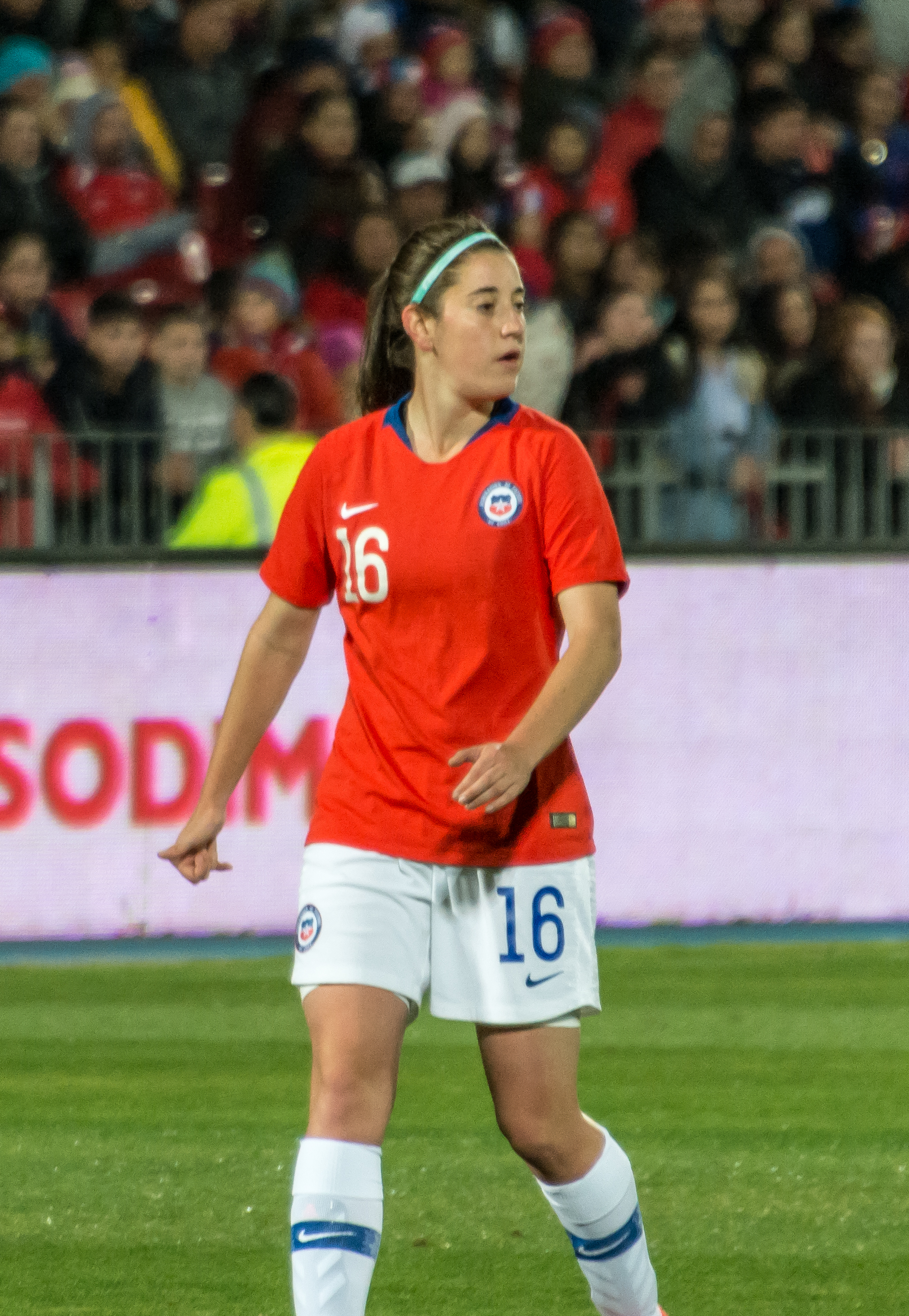
- Balmaceda with Chile in 2019

Personal information
- Full name: Rosario Francisca María Balmaceda Holley
- Date of birth: 26 March 1999 (age 27)
- Place of birth: Santiago, Chile
- Height: 1.63 m (5 ft 4 in)
- Position: Forward

Team information
- Current team: Colo-Colo
- Number: 17

Senior career*
Years	Team	Apps	(Gls)
2015–2018	Universidad de Chile		
2018–2019	Colo-Colo		
2020–2023	Santiago Morning		
2023	Palmeiras		
2024–	Colo-Colo		

International career^{‡}
2016	Chile U17		(2)
2018	Chile U20		(1)
2017–	Chile	5	(0)
- * Club domestic league appearances and goals ‡ National team caps and goals as of 3 March 2019

Rosario Francisca María Balmaceda Holley (born 26 March 1999) is a Chilean footballer who plays as a midfielder for Colo-Colo.

== Club career ==
In March 2023, she moved abroad and joined Brazilian side Palmeiras. The next year, she returned to Chile and joined Colo-Colo.

== International career ==
Balmaceda represented Chile at two South American U-20 Women's Championship editions (2015 and 2018) and the 2016 South American U-17 Women's Championship. She also was part of the Chile squad at the 2018 South American Games.

She made her senior debut on 15 September 2017 in a 0–1 friendly loss against France.

== Honours ==
Santiago Morning

- Primera División de Chile (1): 2020 Transición

Colo-Colo

- Primera División de Chile (3): 2024, 2025, 2026
