= Fabiola Sandoval =

Paraguayan footballer (born 1999)

Personal information
- Full name: Celsa Fabiola Sandoval Barrientos
- Date of birth: 27 May 1999 (age 27)
- Place of birth: Paraguay
- Height: 1.68 m (5 ft 6 in)
- Position: Midfielder

Team information
- Current team: Cruzeiro
- Number: 17

Senior career*
Years	Team	Apps	(Gls)
–2019	Libertad/Limpeño		
2020	Colo-Colo		
2021	Libertad/Limpeño		
2021	Bahia	5	(0)
2022	Avaí	6	(5)
2023	Internacional		
2024-	Cruzeiro	6	(3)

International career^{‡}
2016	Paraguay U17	3	(0)
2018	Paraguay U20	8+	(5)
2018–	Paraguay	5	(1)
- * Club domestic league appearances and goals as of 15 May 2022 ‡ National team caps and goals as of 31 July 2019

Celsa Fabiola Sandoval Barrientos (born 27 May 1999), known as Fabiola Sandoval, is a Paraguayan professional footballer who plays as a midfielder for Brazilian Série A1 club Cruzeiro and the Paraguay women's national team. She has also been part of the national women's under-17 and under-20 teams.

In January 2024, Fabiola Sandoval was announced as a signing for Cruzeiro. The player arrived at the club after her time at Internacional.

== International career ==
Sandoval represented Paraguay at the 2018 South American U-20 Women's Championship and the 2018 FIFA U-20 Women's World Cup.

=== International goals ===
Scores and results list Paraguay's goal tally first

No.	Date	Venue	Opponent	Score	Result	Competition
1	31 July 2019	Estadio Universidad San Marcos, Lima, Peru	Mexico	2–1	2–1	2019 Pan American Games
2	25 October 2023	Estadio Sausalito, Viña del Mar, Chile	Jamaica	4–0	10–0	2023 Pan American Games
3	25 October 2023	Estadio Sausalito, Viña del Mar, Chile	Jamaica	10–0	10–0	2023 Pan American Games
