= Javiera Grez =

Chilean footballer (born 2000)

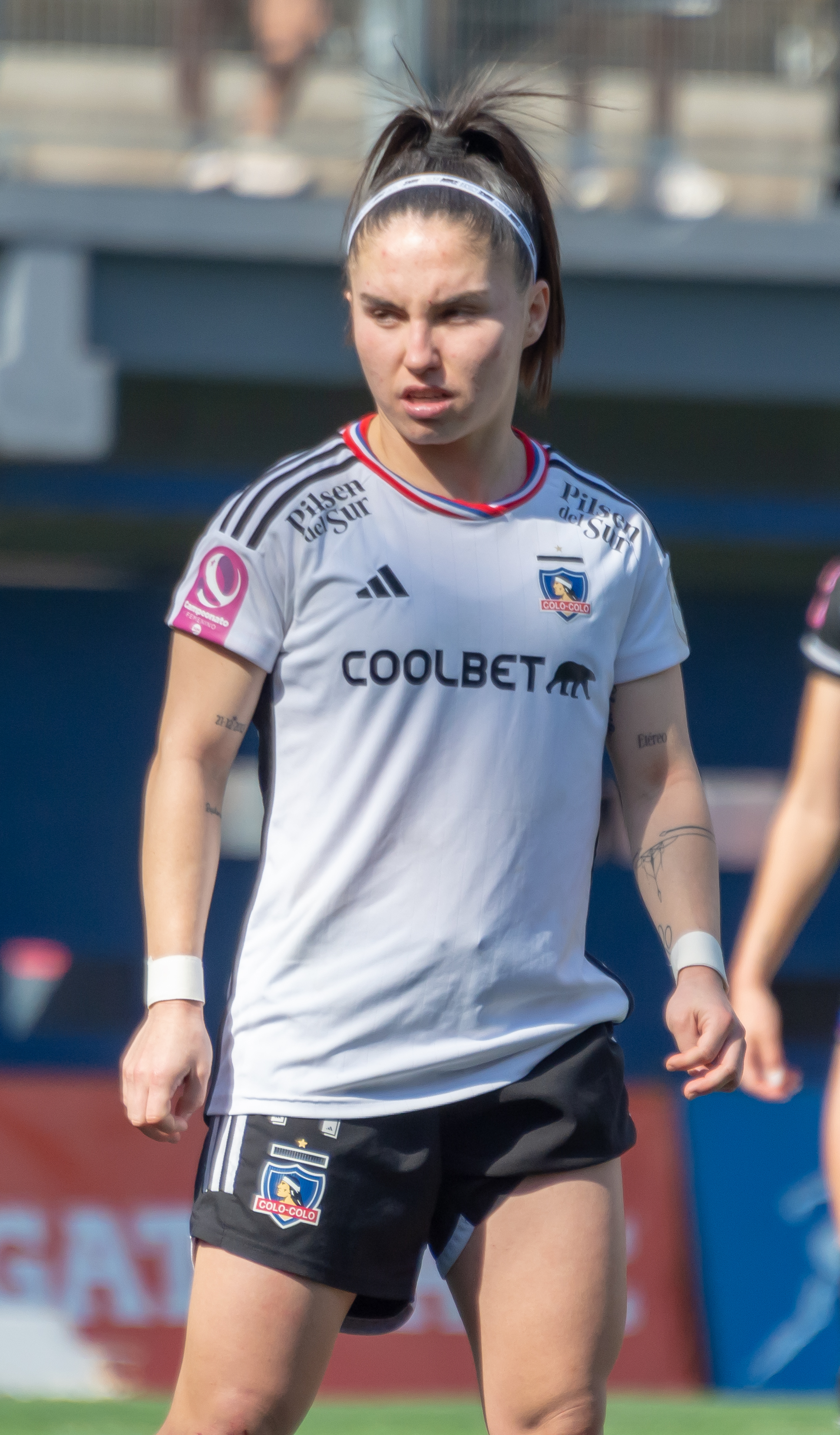
- Grez with Colo-Colo in 2023

Personal information
- Full name: Javiera Matilde Grez Valenzuela
- Date of birth: 11 July 2000 (age 26)
- Place of birth: Lontué, Molina, Chile
- Height: 1.48 m (4 ft 10 in)
- Position: Forward

Team information
- Current team: Colo-Colo
- Number: 14

Senior career*
| Years | Team | Apps | (Gls) |
| 2016–2019 | Curicó Unido | | |
| 2020– | Colo-Colo | | |

International career^{‡}
| 2018 | Chile U20 | 4 | (2) |
| 2017– | Chile | 13 | (2) |
- * Club domestic league appearances and goals ‡ National team caps and goals as of 01:35, 17 June 2019 (UTC)

Javiera Grez Valenzuela (born 11 July 2000) is a Chilean footballer who plays as a forward for Colo-Colo and the Chile women's national team.

== International career ==
Grez represented Chile at the 2018 South American U-20 Women's Championship. She made her senior debut on 26 November 2017 in a 0–4 friendly loss against Brazil. She also was part of the Chile squad at the 2018 South American Games.

== Honours ==
Colo-Colo

- Primera División (5): 2022, 2023, 2024, 2025, 2026

Chile

- Copa América Runner-up (1): 2018

Individual

- Premios Contragolpe - Best Forward: 2021
- Premios Contragolpe - Ideal Team: 2021
- Premios FutFem - Best Forward: 2023
- Primera División Ideal Team: 2024,
