= Rebeca Fernández =

Paraguayan footballer (born 1991)

Personal information
- Full name: Rebeca Melissa Fernández Valiente
- Date of birth: 1 December 1991 (age 34)
- Place of birth: Paraguay
- Height: 1.54 m (5 ft 1 in)
- Position: Forward

Team information
- Current team: Universidad de Chile
- Number: 7

Senior career*
Years	Team	Apps	(Gls)
2007–2010	Cerro Porteño		
2011	Everton		
2012–2013	Cerro Porteño		
2013–2020	Santiago Wanderers		
2021–	Universidad de Chile		

International career
2008	Paraguay U17	3	(1)
2010–	Paraguay	5+	(4)
- * Club domestic league appearances and goals

Rebeca Melissa Fernández Valiente (born 1 December 1991) is a Paraguayan footballer who plays as a forward for Chilean club Universidad de Chile and the Paraguay women's national team. She has previously also played for the national under-17 team.

== International career ==
Fernández represented Paraguay at the 2008 FIFA U-17 Women's World Cup. At senior level, she played two Copa América Femenina editions (2010 and 2014).

=== International goals ===
Scores and results list Paraguay's goal tally first

No.	Date	Venue	Opponent	Score	Result	Competition
1	18 September 2014	Estadio Alejandro Serrano Aguilar, Cuenca, Ecuador	Bolivia	1–0	10–2	2014 Copa América Femenina
2	18 September 2014	Estadio Alejandro Serrano Aguilar, Cuenca, Ecuador	Bolivia	6–1	10–2	2014 Copa América Femenina
3	18 September 2014	Estadio Alejandro Serrano Aguilar, Cuenca, Ecuador	Bolivia	7–1	10–2	2014 Copa América Femenina
4	18 September 2014	Estadio Alejandro Serrano Aguilar, Cuenca, Ecuador	Bolivia	10–2	10–2	2014 Copa América Femenina
5	25 October 2023	Estadio Sausalito, Viña del Mar, Chile	Jamaica	3–0	10–0	2023 Pan American Games
6	28 October 2023	Estadio Sausalito, Viña del Mar, Chile	Mexico	1–0	1–4	2023 Pan American Games
7	31 October 2023	Estadio Sausalito, Viña del Mar, Chile	Costa Rica	1–1	3–1	2023 Pan American Games
8	31 October 2023	Estadio Sausalito, Viña del Mar, Chile	Costa Rica	3–1	3–1	2023 Pan American Games
9	3 March 2024	BMO Stadium, Los Angeles, United States	Mexico	2–3	2–3	2024 CONCACAF W Gold Cup
10	5 June 2026	Estadio Municipal de El Alto, El Alto, Bolivia	Bolivia	6–0	8–0	2025–26 CONMEBOL Women's Nations League

== Honours ==
Cerro Porteño

- Paraguayan Championship (3): 2007, 2012, 2013

Universidad de Chile

- Primera División (1): 2021

Individual

- Premios FutFem - The Best: 2022
- Premios FutFem - Best Foreign Player: 2022
- Premios Contragolpe - Ideal Team: 2021
- Premios América Responde - El País Best Female Player of Chile: 2022
