= Maricel Pereyra =

Argentine footballer (born 2002)

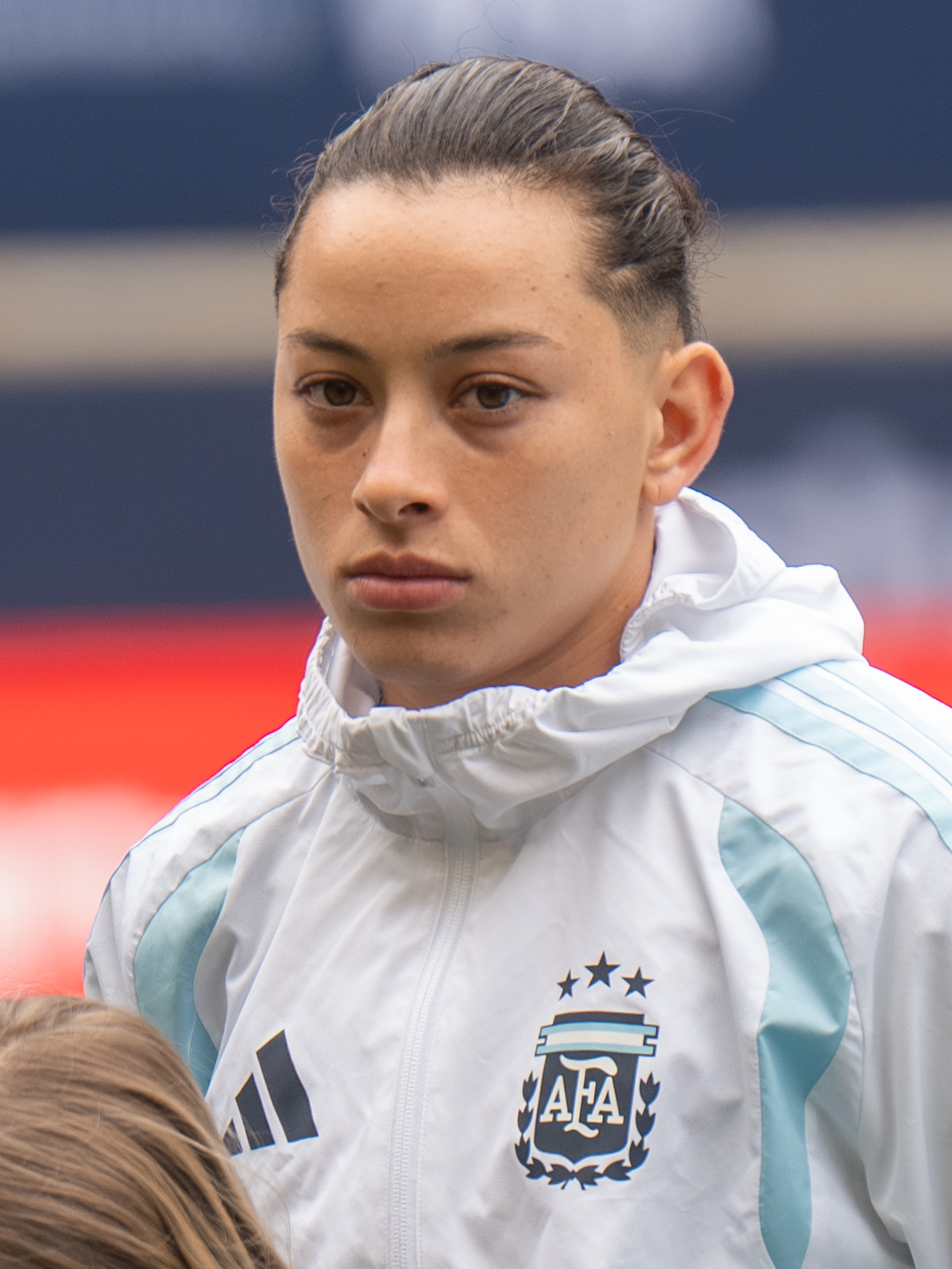
- Pereyra in 2026

Personal information
- Date of birth: 11 May 2002 (age 24)
- Place of birth: Rafael Castillo, Buenos Aires, Argentina
- Height: 1.60 m (5 ft 3 in)
- Position: Midfielder

Team information
- Current team: São Paulo
- Number: 16

Senior career*
Years	Team	Apps	(Gls)
2018–2025	San Lorenzo		
2026–	São Paulo		

International career^{‡}
- Argentina U17
- Argentina U20
2021–	Argentina	40	(7)
Medal record
Women's football
Representing Argentina
Copa América Femenina
Third place	2022 Colombia
Bronze medal – third place	2025 Ecuador
- * Club domestic league appearances and goals as of 17 February 2024 ‡ National team caps and goals as of 10 October 2026

Maricel Pereyra (born 11 May 2002) is an Argentine professional footballer and former futsal player who plays as a midfielder for Campeonato Brasileiro Feminino A1 club São Paulo and the Argentina women's national team. She is one of the first female professional players in Argentina.

== Club career ==
Pereyra became the first female ball boy at the Pedro Bidegain Stadium alongside Rocío Vázquez on 23 October 2018, in the match between San Lorenzo and San Martin de San Juan. In April 2019, she was one of fifteen players who joined San Lorenzo on a professional contract, a historic first for Argentine women's football.

== International career ==
Pereyra represented the Argentina U-17 and U-20 teams, before being called up to the senior national teams. She made her senior debut for the Argentina national team on 27 November 2021, in a goalless draw against the Ecuadorian national team at the Rodrigo Paz Delgado Stadium in Quito, where she came on in the 85th minute for Ruth Bravo.

Pereyra was added to the Argentine squad for Copa América Femenina on 27 June 2022. She was also named to the senior national team for the CONCACAF W Gold Cup on 9 February 2024.

In June 2025, Pereyra was named to the senior national team for the 2025 Copa América Femenina.

== Career statistics ==
=== International ===
As of match played 10 October 2026

Appearances and goals by national team and year
National team	Year	Apps	Goals
Argentina	2021	2	0
Argentina	2022	3	0
Argentina	2023	7	0
Argentina	2024	9	3
Argentina	2025	12	3
Argentina	2026	7	1
Total		40	7

=== International goals ===
Scores and results list Argentina's goal tally first

No.	Date	Venue	Opponent	Score	Result	Competition
1.	26 February 2024	Dignity Health Sports Park, Carson, United States	Dominican Republic	3–0	3–0	2024 CONCACAF W Gold Cup
2.	3 June 2024	Estadio Ciudad de Vicente López, Florida, Argentina	Costa Rica	2–0	2–0	Friendly
3.	13 July 2024	Predio Lionel Andrés Messi, Ezeiza, Argentina	Uruguay	1–0	1–0	Friendly
4.	22 February 2025	Estadio Bicentenario de La Florida, La Florida, Chile	Chile	1–0	3–0	Friendly
5.	24 October 2025	Estadio Diego Armando Maradona, Buenos Aires, Argentina	Paraguay	3–1	3–1	2025–26 CONMEBOL Liga de Naciones Femenina
6.	28 October 2025	Estadio Centenario, Montevideo, Uruguay	Uruguay	1–1	2–2	2025–26 CONMEBOL Liga de Naciones Femenina
7.	10 October 2026	Estádio Beira-Rio, Porto Alegre, Brazil	Brazil	1–3	1–3	Friendly

== Honours ==
=== Football ===
San Lorenzo

- Primera División A: Ap. 2021, Cl. 2024

Argentina

- Copa América Third place: 2022

=== Futsal ===
San Lorenzo

- Primera División: Torneo Clausura 2017, Torneo Anual 2017
- Copa Argentina: 2018
- Supercopa: 2019
