= Fanny Godoy =

Paraguayan footballer (born 1998)

Personal information
- Full name: Fanny Paola Godoy Duarte
- Date of birth: 21 January 1998 (age 28)
- Place of birth: San Estanislao, Paraguay
- Height: 1.56 m (5 ft 1 in)
- Position: Midfielder

Team information
- Current team: Juan Grande
- Number: 11

Senior career*
| Years | Team | Apps | (Gls) |
| –2018 | Universidad Autónoma | | |
| 2018 | Deportivo Capiatá | | |
| 2019–2020 | Sol de América | | |
| 2020– | Juan Grande | 41 | (1) |

International career^{‡}
| 2014 | Paraguay U17 | 3 | (1) |
| 2014–2018 | Paraguay U20 | 4 | (0) |
| 2014– | Paraguay | 9 | (0) |
- * Club domestic league appearances and goals as of 28 May 2022 ‡ National team caps and goals as of 31 July 2019

Fanny Paola Godoy Duarte (born 21 January 1998) is a Paraguayan footballer who plays as a midfielder for Spanish Primera Federación club CD Juan Grande and the Paraguay women's national team. She has also played for the Paraguay women's U17 and U20 teams.
