= Natalia Acuña =

Mexican footballer (born 2002)

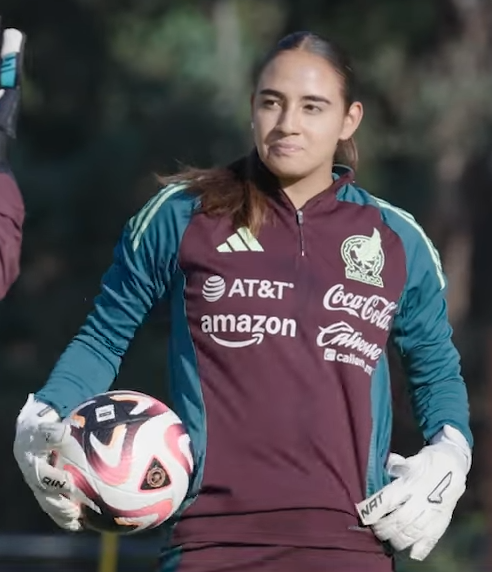
- Acuña training with Mexico U-23 in 2025

Personal information
- Full name: Natalia Acuña Soto
- Date of birth: 3 July 2002 (age 24)
- Place of birth: Coyoacán, Mexico City, Mexico
- Height: 1.70 m (5 ft 7 in)
- Position: Goalkeeper

Team information
- Current team: León
- Number: 23

Senior career*
| Years | Team | Apps | (Gls) |
| 2017–2020 | Querétaro | 38 | (0) |
| 2020–2022 | América | 12 | (0) |
| 2022 | → Tijuana (loan) | 3 | (0) |
| 2023 | Juárez | 6 | (0) |
| 2024– | León | 33 | (0) |

International career^{‡}
| 2022 | Mexico U-20 | | |
- * Club domestic league appearances and goals as of 9 February 2026 ‡ National team caps and goals as of 14 July 2023

Natalia Acuña Soto (born 3 July 2002) is a Mexican professional footballer who plays as a goalkeeper for Liga MX Femenil club León.

== Career ==
Acuña started her career in 2017 with Querétaro. In 2020 she joined América. In 2022 she was loaned to Tijuana. After one season she moved to Juárez. Since 2024 she is part of León.

== International career ==
Acuña was also part of the team that participated in the 2022 FIFA U-20 Women's World Cup in Costa Rica.
