= Cristina Recalde =

Paraguayan footballer (born 1994)

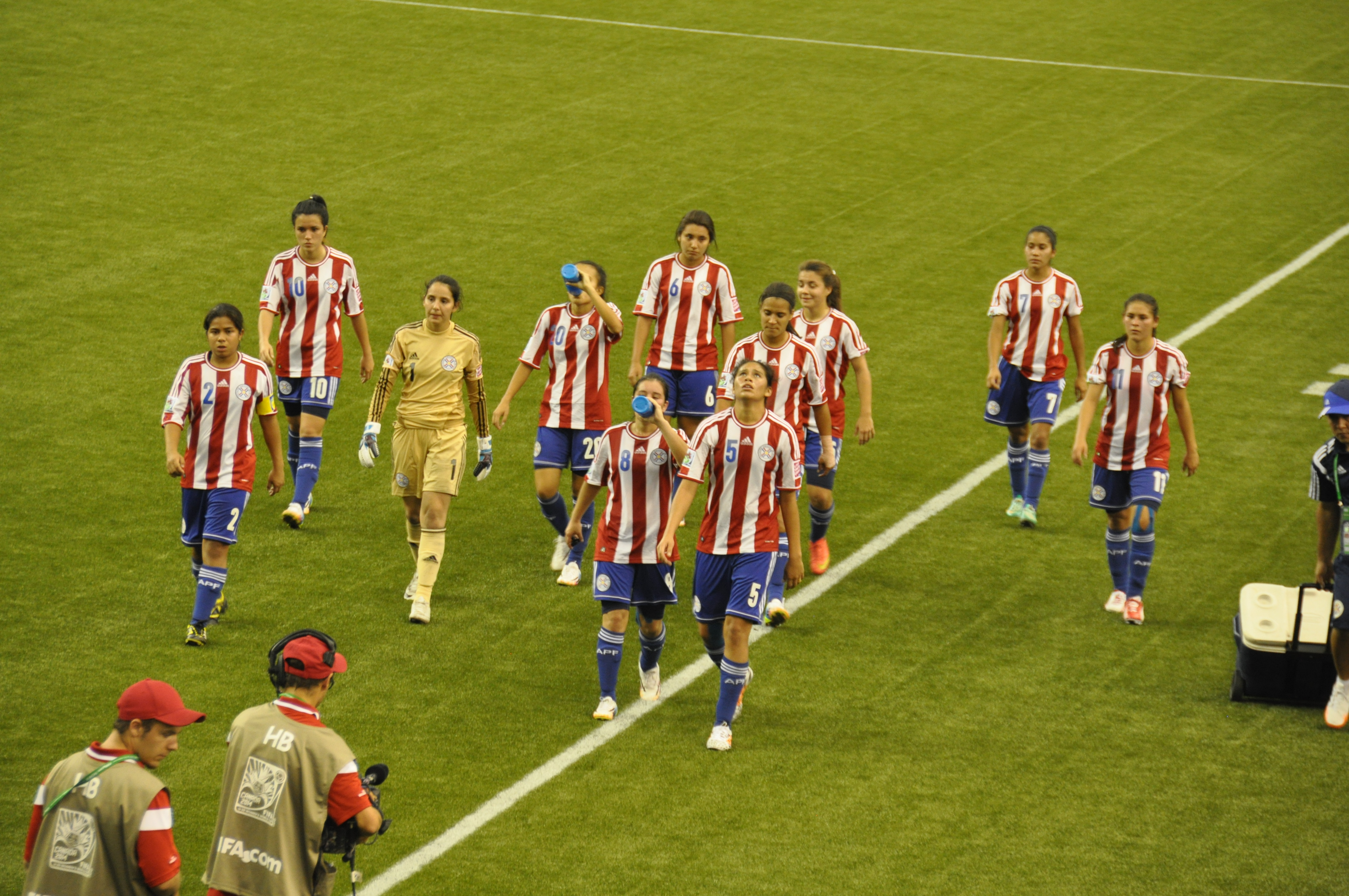

Personal information
- Full name: Cristina Elizabeth Recalde Cabañas
- Date of birth: 29 March 1994 (age 32)
- Place of birth: Asunción, Paraguay
- Height: 1.67 m (5 ft 6 in)
- Position: Goalkeeper

Team information
- Current team: Juan Grande
- Number: 1

Senior career*
Years	Team	Apps	(Gls)
–2018	Universidad Autónoma		
2018	Deportivo Capiatá		
2019–2020	Sol de América		
2020–	Juan Grande	38	(0)

International career^{‡}
2014	Paraguay U20	3	(0)
2014–	Paraguay	7	(0)
- * Club domestic league appearances and goals as of 15 May 2022 ‡ National team caps and goals as of 31 July 2019

Cristina Elizabeth Recalde Cabañas (born 29 March 1994) is a Paraguayan footballer who plays as a goalkeeper for the Spanish Primera Federación club CD Juan Grande and the Paraguay women's national team. She has also played for the Paraguay women's U20 team.
