= Jessica Martínez =

Paraguayan footballer (born 1999)

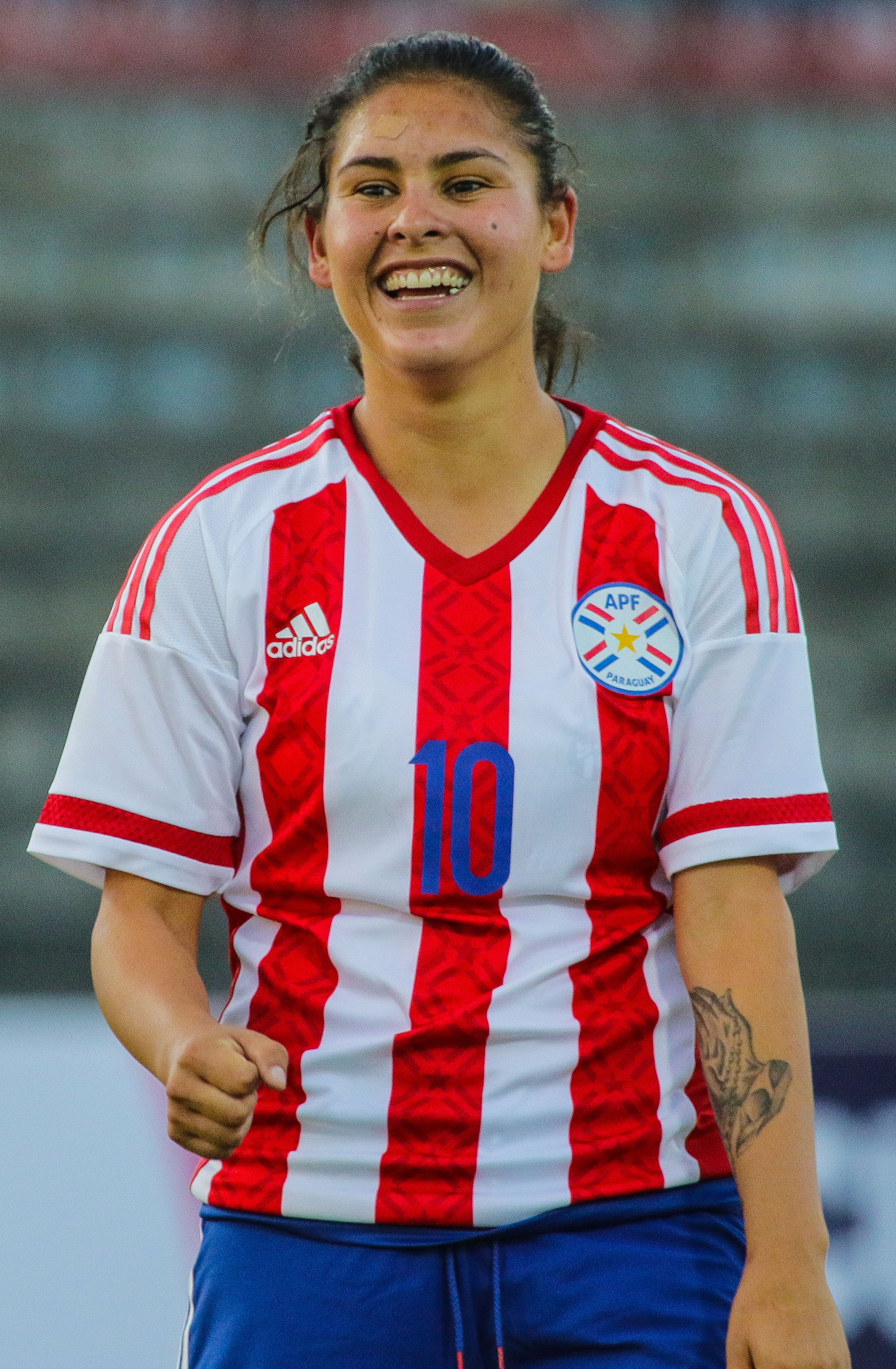
- Martínez with Paraguay U20 in 2018

Personal information
- Full name: Jessica Dahiana Martínez Villagra
- Date of birth: 14 June 1999 (age 27)
- Place of birth: Itauguá, Paraguay
- Height: 1.60 m (5 ft 3 in)
- Position: Forward

Team information
- Current team: Guarani
- Number: 8

Senior career*
Years	Team	Apps	(Gls)
2014–2015	Sportivo Limpeño		
2015–2016	Olimpia		
2016–2017	Sportivo Limpeño		
2017–2018	Santos	1	(1)
2019–2020	CD Tacón	21	(3)
2020–2021	Real Madrid	24	(5)
2021–2023	Sevilla	54	(12)
2023–2024	Levante Las Planas	25	(8)
2024	Al-Hilal	17	(14)
2024	Guarani	19	(0)

International career
2013–2016	Paraguay U17	6	(1)
2014–2018	Paraguay U20	6	(0)
2014–	Paraguay	25	(23)
- * Club domestic league appearances and goals

Jessica Dahiana "Pirayú" Martínez Villagra (born 14 June 1999) is a Paraguayan professional footballer who plays as a forward for Saudi Women's Premier League club Al-Hilal and the Paraguay women's national team. She has previously been a regular member of the national under-20 and under-17 teams.

== International career ==
Martínez represented Paraguay at two South American Under-17 Women's Football Championship editions (2013 and 2016), two FIFA U-17 Women's World Cup editions (2014 and 2016), three South American U-20 Women's Championship editions (2014, 2015 and 2018) and two FIFA U-20 Women's World Cup editions (2014 and 2018). She has scored five goals in the Copa América Femenina (three in the 2014 edition and two in the 2018 edition).

=== International goals ===
Scores and results list Paraguay's goal tally first

No.	Date	Venue	Opponent	Score	Result	Competition
1	18 September 2014	Estadio Alejandro Serrano Aguilar, Cuenca, Ecuador	Bolivia	5–1	10–2	2014 Copa América Femenina
2	18 September 2014	Estadio Alejandro Serrano Aguilar, Cuenca, Ecuador	Bolivia	8–1	10–2	2014 Copa América Femenina
3	20 September 2014	Estadio Jorge Andrade, Azogues, Ecuador	Chile	3–2	3–2	2014 Copa América Femenina
4	6 April 2018	Estadio La Portada, La Serena, Chile	Peru	2–0	3–0	2018 Copa América Femenina
5	12 April 2018	Estadio La Portada, La Serena, Chile	Uruguay	1–1	2–1	2018 Copa América Femenina
6	3 August 2019	Estadio Universidad San Marcos, Lima, Peru	Jamaica	1–0	3–1	2019 Pan American Games
7	3 August 2019	Estadio Universidad San Marcos, Lima, Peru	Jamaica	2–1	3–1	2019 Pan American Games
8	4 October 2019	Estadio Evelio Hernández, San Felipe, Venezuela	Venezuela	1–1	1–1	Friendly
9	30 November 2021	Estadio Gunther Vogel, San Lorenzo, Paraguay	Peru	1–1	4–2	Friendly
10	30 November 2021	Estadio Gunther Vogel, San Lorenzo, Paraguay	Peru	2–1	4–2	Friendly
11	19 February 2022	Estadio Gunther Vogel, San Lorenzo, Paraguay	Uruguay	1–1	1–1	Friendly
12	22 February 2022	Estadio Gunther Vogel, San Lorenzo, Paraguay	Uruguay	1–0	2–0	Friendly
13	8 July 2022	Estadio Olímpico Pascual Guerrero, Cali, Colombia	Colombia	1–1	2–4	2022 Copa América Femenina
14	11 July 2022	Estadio Olímpico Pascual Guerrero, Cali, Colombia	Chile	2–0	3–2	2022 Copa América Femenina
15	20 July 2022	Estadio Olímpico Pascual Guerrero, Cali, Colombia	Ecuador	1–0	2–1	2022 Copa América Femenina
16	25 October 2023	Estadio Sausalito, Viña del Mar, Chile	Jamaica	2–0	10–0	2023 Pan American Games
17	25 October 2023	Estadio Sausalito, Viña del Mar, Chile	Jamaica	5–0	10–0	2023 Pan American Games
18	25 October 2023	Estadio Sausalito, Viña del Mar, Chile	Jamaica	7–0	10–0	2023 Pan American Games
19	31 October 2023	Estadio Sausalito, Viña del Mar, Chile	Costa Rica	2–1	3–1	2023 Pan American Games
20	3 December 2023	National Women Training Center, Asunción, Paraguay	Russia	1–1	1–1	Friendly
21	28 February 2024	Shell Energy Stadium, Houston, United States	El Salvador	1–0	3–2	2024 CONCACAF W Gold Cup
22	28 February 2024	Shell Energy Stadium, Houston, United States	El Salvador	2–2	3–2	2024 CONCACAF W Gold Cup
23	28 February 2024	Shell Energy Stadium, Houston, United States	El Salvador	3–2	3–2	2024 CONCACAF W Gold Cup

== Honors and awards ==
=== Clubs ===
Sportivo Limpeño

- Copa Libertadores Femenina: 2016
