= Tania Riso =

Paraguayan footballer (born 1994)

Personal information
- Full name: Tania Raquel Riso Ayala
- Date of birth: 26 January 1994 (age 32)
- Place of birth: Asunción, Paraguay
- Height: 1.78 m (5 ft 10 in)
- Position: Centre back

Team information
- Current team: AEM

Senior career*
| Years | Team | Apps | (Gls) |
- 12 de Octubre
| 2017 | Deportivo Capiatá | | |
| 2018 | Sportivo Limpeño | | |
| 2019–20?? | Deportivo Capiatá | | |
| 2022– | AEM | 15 | (0) |

International career^{‡}
| 2014 | Paraguay U20 | 3 | (0) |
| 2014– | Paraguay | 8 | (0) |
- * Club domestic league appearances and goals ‡ National team caps and goals as of 31 July 2019

Tania Raquel Riso Ayala (born 26 January 1994) is a Paraguayan footballer who plays as a centre back for Spanish club SE AEM and the Paraguay women's national team. She was previously on the national women's under-20 team.
