= Alicia Bobadilla =

Paraguayan footballer (born 1994)

Personal information
- Full name: Alicia Noemí Bobadilla Aguilera
- Date of birth: 5 June 1994 (age 32)
- Place of birth: Asunción, Paraguay
- Height: 1.68 m (5 ft 6 in)
- Position: Goalkeeper

Team information
- Current team: Racing Club
- Number: 12

Senior career*
Years	Team	Apps	(Gls)
2014–2017	Sportivo Limpeño		
2017–2018	Deportivo Capiatá		
2018	Sportivo Limpeño		
2018–2019	Cerro Porteño		
2019–2020	Sportivo Limpeño		
2021–2022	San Lorenzo		
2023	Palmeiras		
2024–	Racing Club		

International career
2014–2018	Paraguay U20		
2018–	Paraguay		
- * Club domestic league appearances and goals

Alicia Noemí Bobadilla Aguilera (born 5 June 1994) is a Paraguayan professional footballer who plays as a goalkeeper for Racing Club and the Paraguay women's national team.

== Club career ==
Besides Paraguay, Bobadilla has played in Brazil and Argentina. She started her career with the Paraguayan side Sportivo Limpeño. After that, she signed for the Argentine side San Lorenzo.

== International career ==
Bobadilla has represented the Paraguay women's national football team internationally.
