= Estadio Olímpico de Riobamba =

Ecuadorian sports arena

Estadio Olímpico
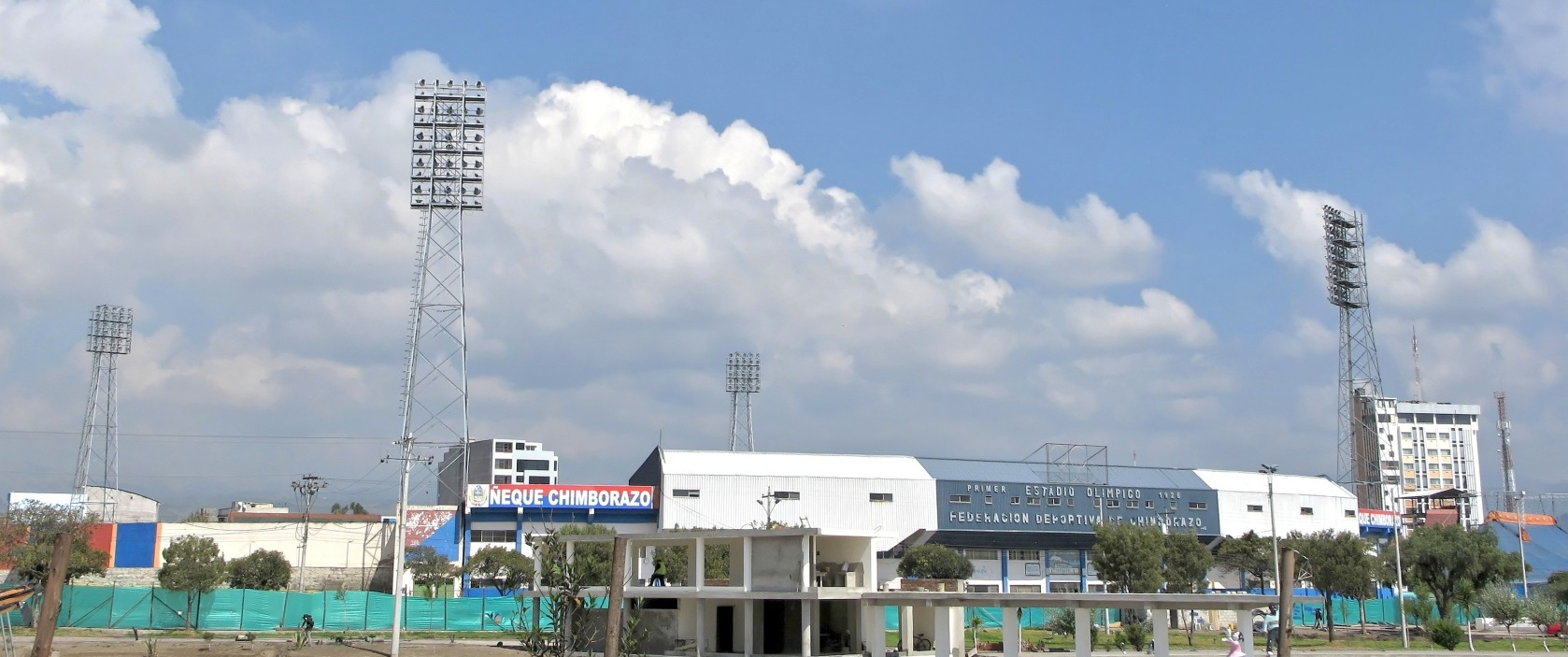
- EC Riobamba EstadioOlímpico
- Interactive map of Estadio Olímpico
- Full name: Primer Estadio Olímpico
- Former names: Primer Estadio Olímpico Municipal; Estadio Olímpico Municipal; Estadio Olímpico "Ciudad de Riobamba"
- Location: Avenida Carlos Zambrano S/N y Unidad Nacional; Riobamba, Ecuador
- Coordinates: 1.666082°S 78.659882°W
- Owner: Federación Deportiva de Chimborazo
- Operator: Federación Deportiva de Chimborazo
- Capacity: 14,400
- Field size: 100 x 66 m

Construction
- Opened: March 14, 1926
- Renovated: November 10, 1973; August 4, 1995

Tenant
- Olmedo

Estadio Olímpico, commonly referred to as Estadio Olímpico de Riobamba to disambiguate it from other stadiums of a similar name, is a multi-use stadium in Riobamba, Ecuador. It is currently used mostly for football matches and is the home stadium of Olmedo and other lower division clubs in the city. The stadium holds 14,400 spectators and opened in 1926.
