= Lice Chamorro =

Paraguayan footballer (born 1998)

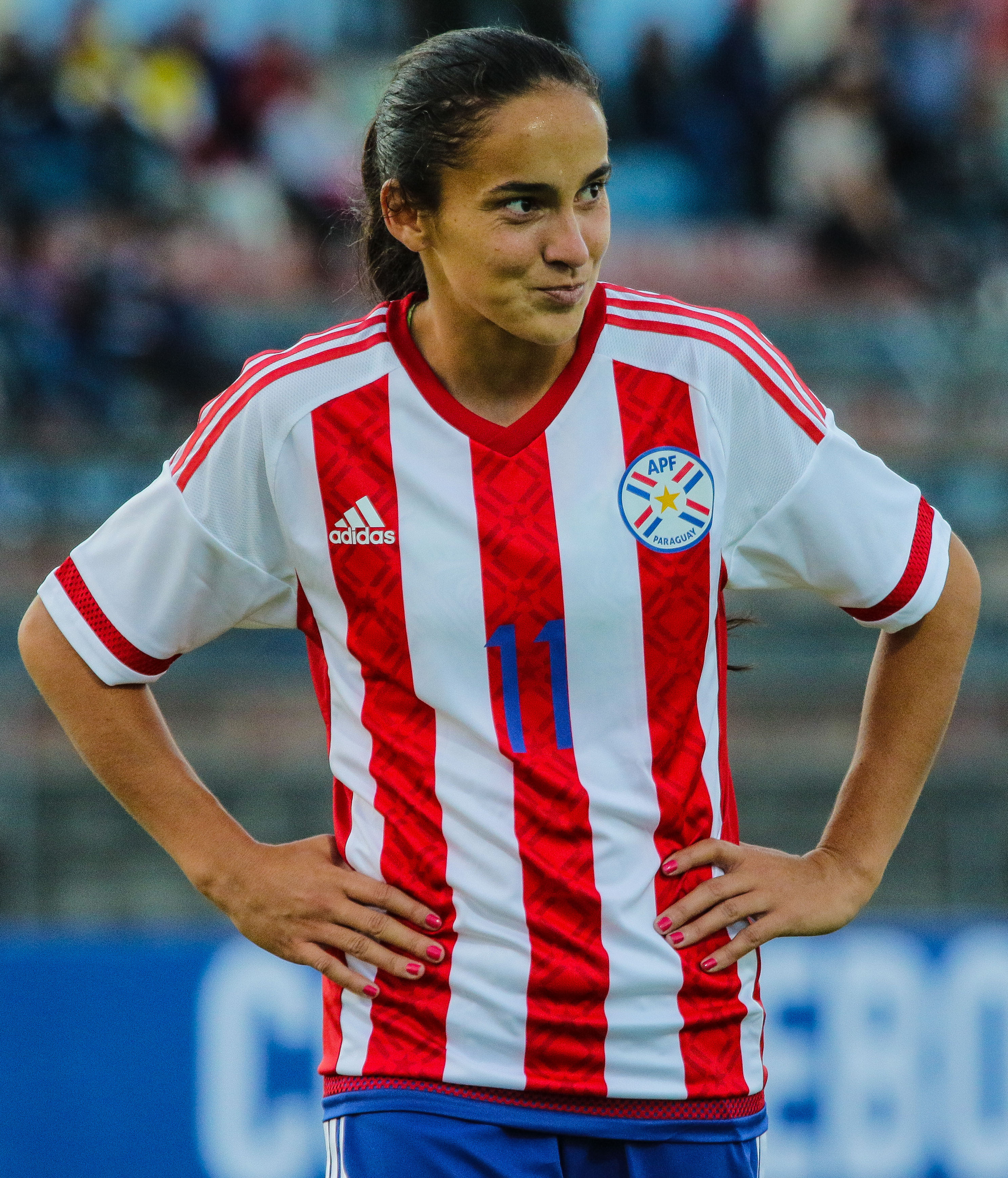

Personal information
- Full name: Lice Fabiana Chamorro Gómez
- Date of birth: 22 December 1998 (age 27)
- Place of birth: Pedro Juan Caballero, Paraguay
- Height: 1.72 m (5 ft 8 in)
- Positions: Left winger; left back

Team information
- Current team: RCD Espanyol femenino
- Number: 10

Senior career*
Years	Team	Apps	(Gls)
–2018	Cerro Porteño		
2018–2019	Sporting Huelva	23	(0)
2019–2020	Racing Santander	22	(15)
2020–2022	Alavés	76	(10)

International career^{‡}
2018	Paraguay U20	3	(0)
2018–	Paraguay	3	(0)
- * Club domestic league appearances and goals as of 23 April 2023 ‡ National team caps and goals as of 13 August 2018

Lice Fabiana Chamorro Gómez (born 22 December 1998) is a Paraguayan professional footballer who plays as a midfielder for Spanish Primera División club Levante Badalona and the Paraguay women's national team. A right-footed left winger, she has previously played for the Paraguay under-20 team.

== Club career ==
Chamorro played in the Spanish Primera División for Sporting de Huelva between 2018 and 2019.

== International career ==
=== International goals ===
Scores and results list Paraguay's goal tally first

No	Date	Venue	Opponent	Score	Result	Competition
1.	27 November 2021	Estadio Defensores del Chaco, Asunción, Paraguay	Peru	1–1	1–1	Friendly
2.	19 February 2023	North Harbour Stadium, Auckland, New Zealand	Chinese Taipei	2–2	2–2 (a.e.t.) (4–2 p)	2023 FIFA Women's World Cup qualification
3.	22 February 2024	Shell Energy Stadium, Houston, United States	Costa Rica	1–0	1–0	2024 CONCACAF W Gold Cup
4.	28 October 2025	Estadio Tigo La Huerta, Asunción, Paraguay	Venezuela	1–1	1–2	2025–26 CONMEBOL Women's Nations League
5.	5 June 2026	Estadio Municipal de El Alto, El Alto, Bolivia	Bolivia	3–0	8–0	2025–26 CONMEBOL Women's Nations League
6.	9 June 2026	Estadio Defensores del Chaco, Asunción, Paraguay	Colombia	3–2	3–4	2025–26 CONMEBOL Women's Nations League
