= Ana Vitória =

Brazilian footballer (born 2000)

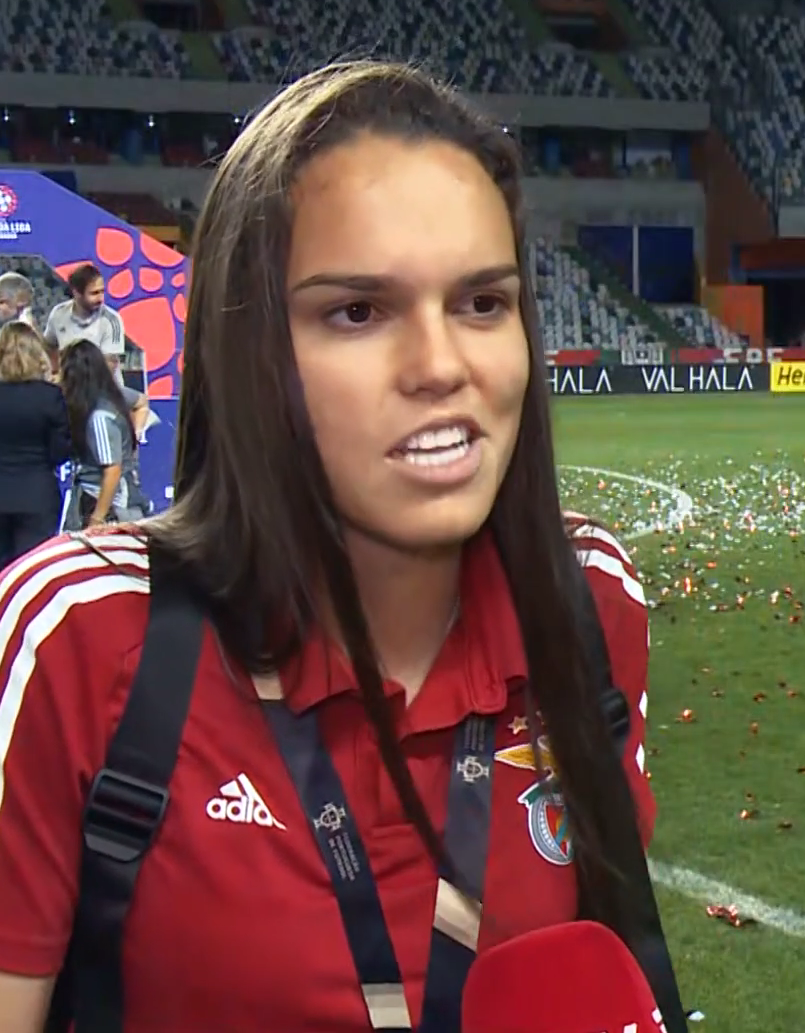
- Ana Vitória in 2021

Personal information
- Full name: Ana Vitória Angélica Kliemaschewsk de Araújo
- Date of birth: 6 March 2000 (age 26)
- Place of birth: Rondonópolis, Mato Grosso, Brazil
- Position: Midfielder

Team information
- Current team: Corinthians

Senior career*
Years	Team	Apps	(Gls)
2015	Mixto	4	(1)
2017–2019	Corinthians	43	(3)
2019–2023	Benfica	74	(41)
2023–2024	Paris Saint-Germain	2	(0)
2024	→ Atlético Madrid (loan)	14	(1)
2024–2026	Atlético Madrid	27	(1)
2026–	Corinthians	0	(0)

International career^{‡}
2020–	Brazil	18	(1)
Medal record
Women's football
Representing Brazil
Olympic Games
Silver medal – second place	2024 Paris
- * Club domestic league appearances and goals as of 18:49, 28 December 2025 (UTC) ‡ National team caps and goals as of 9 July 2024

Ana Vitória Angélica Kliemaschewsk de Araújo (born 6 March 2000) is a Brazilian professional footballer who plays as a midfielder for Brazilian club Corinthians and the Brazil national team.

== Club career ==
Ana Vitória became the youngest footballer to score in the Campeonato Brasileiro de Futebol Feminino Série A1 in September 2015 when she scored for Mixto. In January 2019, she left Corinthians after two seasons and it was announced that she would join Benfica and be the first player to wear the number 10 shirt for the Portuguese club. On 15 July 2021, she renewed her contract with Benfica for a further two seasons, keeping her at the club until 2023.

On 3 July 2023, Ana Vitória was announced at PSG on a three year contract until 30 June 2026.

On 25 January 2024, Ana Vitória was announced at Atlético Madrid on loan until the end of the season. On 28 June, Ana Vitória was announced at on a permanent transfer, signing a contract until 30 June 2026.

Ana Vitória returned to Corinthians in 2026, signing a two year contract.

== International career ==
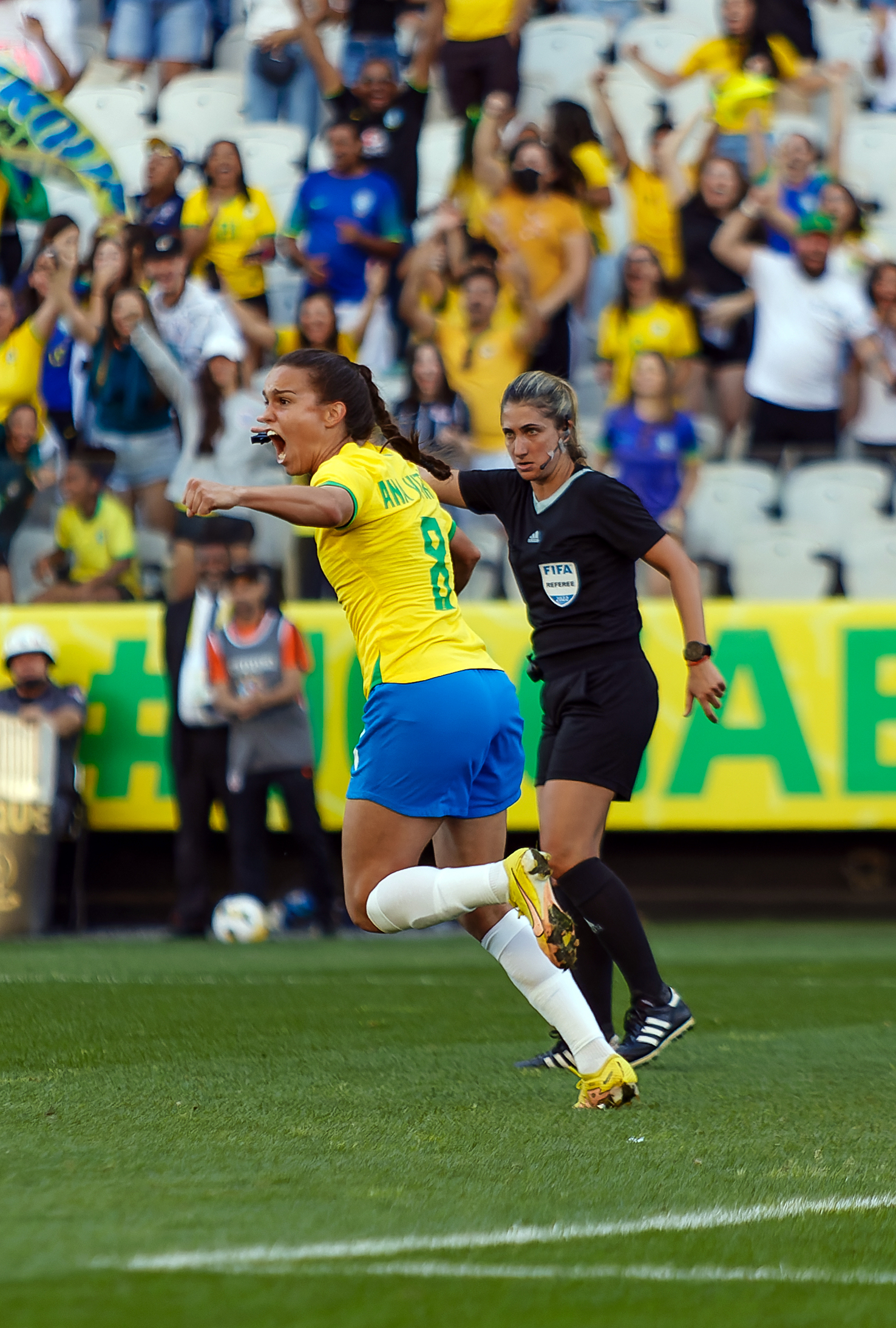
Ana Vitória celebrates scoring for Brazil women's national football team in 2022.

Ana Vitória made her debut for the Brazil national team on 2 December 2020 against Ecuador. She had also been eligible to play for Poland through descent.

Ana Vitória was called up to the Brazil squad for the 2023 FIFA Women's World Cup.

On 2 July 2024, Ana Vitória was called up to the Brazil squad for the 2024 Summer Olympics. She played all six games, two as a starter, as Brazil ended up with the silver medal.

== Career statistics ==
Goal	Date	Location	Opponent	Score	Result	Competition
1	2022-11-15	São Paulo, Brazil	Canada	2–1	2–1	Friendly game

== Honours ==
Corinthians

- Campeonato Brasileiro Feminino: 2018
- Copa Libertadores Femenina: 2017

Benfica

- Campeonato Nacional Feminino: 2020–21, 2021–22, 2022–23
- Campeonato Nacional II Divisão: 2018–19
- Taça de Portugal: 2018–19
- Taça da Liga: 2019–20, 2020–21, 2022–23
- Supertaça de Portugal: 2019, 2022

Paris Saint-Germain

- Coupe de France: 2023–24

Brazil

- Summer Olympics silver medal: 2024
