= Angie Castañeda =

Colombian footballer (born 1998)

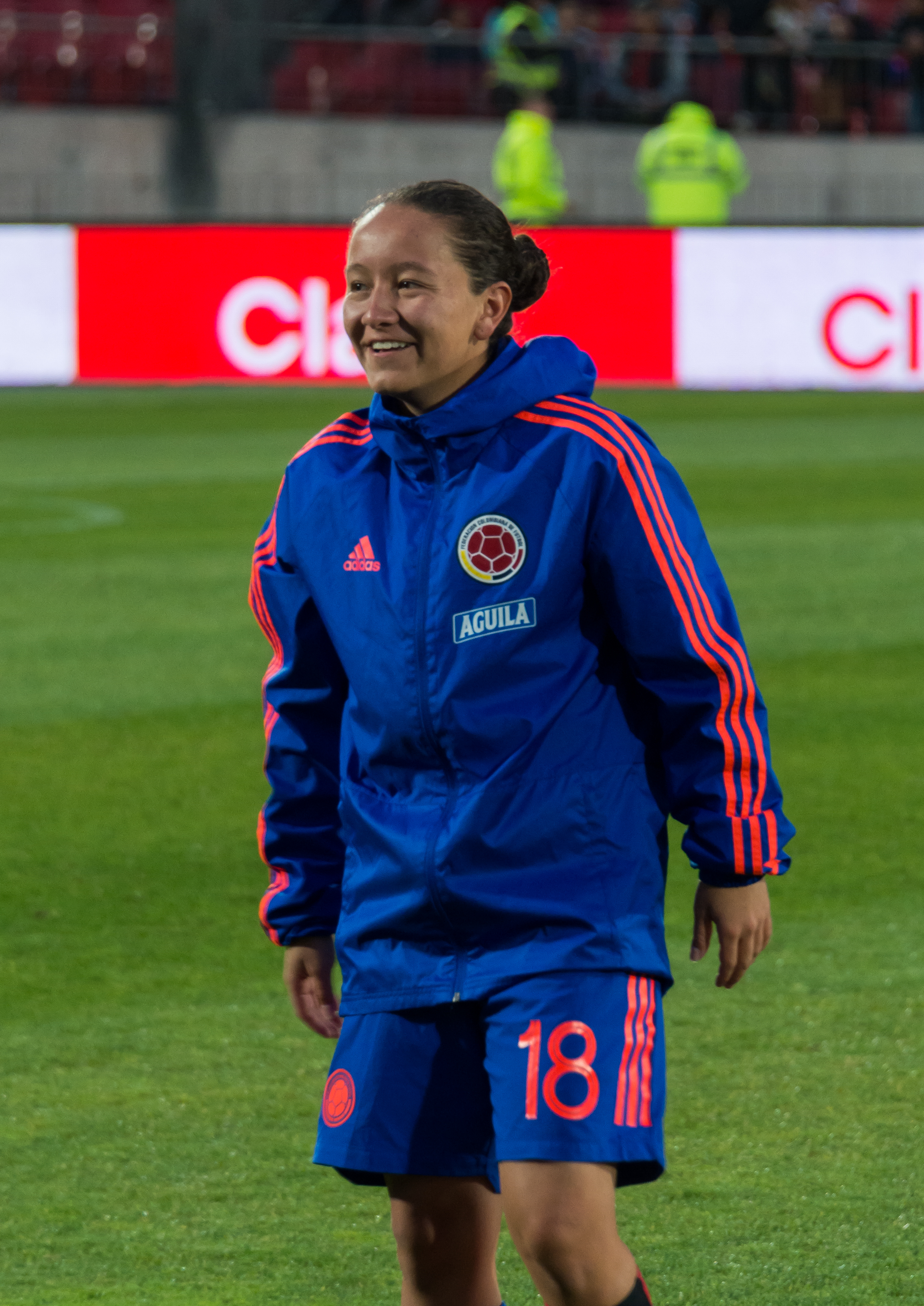

Personal information
- Full name: Angie Julieth Castañeda Vanegas
- Date of birth: 4 February 1998 (age 28)
- Place of birth: Bogotá, Colombia
- Height: 1.60 m (5 ft 3 in)
- Position: Forward

Team information
- Current team: Cacereño
- Number: 7

Senior career*
Years	Team	Apps	(Gls)
2017–2019	Santa Fe		
2020	CFF Cáceres	6	(1)
2021–	Cacereño	27	(7)

International career^{‡}
2014	Colombia U17	3	(0)
2018–	Colombia	3	(0)
Medal record
Women's football
Representing Colombia
Copa América Femenina
Runner-up	2022 Colombia
- * Club domestic league appearances and goals as of 28 May 2022 ‡ National team caps and goals as of 23 July 2018

Angie Julieth Castañeda Vanegas (born 4 February 1998) is a Colombian footballer who plays as a forward for Spanish Primera Federación club CP Cacereño and the Colombia women's national team.

== International career ==
Castañeda represented Colombia at the 2014 FIFA U-17 Women's World Cup. She made her senior debut on 19 July 2018 in a 0–1 friendly loss to Costa Rica.
