= Paraguay women's national football team =

Women's National Association football team representing Paraguay

Paraguay
- Nickname: Las Guaraníes/La Albirroja
- Association: Paraguayan Football Association
- Confederation: CONMEBOL (South America)
- Head coach: Fábio Fukumoto
- Captain: Veronica Riveros
- Top scorer: Jessica Martinez (10)
- Home stadium: Estadio Defensores del Chaco
- FIFA code: PAR
First colours	Second colours

FIFA ranking
- Current: 44 ▲1 (16 June 2026)
- Highest: 41 (August 2025)
- Lowest: 67 (September 2006)

First international
- Paraguay 3–2 Uruguay (Mar del Plata, Argentina; 1 March 1998)

Biggest win
- Paraguay 10–0 Jamaica (Viña del Mar, Chile; 25 October 2023)

Biggest defeat
- United States 9–0 Paraguay (Cleveland, United States; 16 September 2021)

Copa América
- Appearances: 8 (first in 1998)
- Best result: Fourth place (2006, 2022)

CONCACAF W Gold Cup
- Appearances: 1 (first in 2024)
- Best result: Quarter-finals (2024)

The Paraguay women's national football team represents Paraguay in international women's football and is controlled by the Paraguayan Football Association (Asociación Paraguaya de Fútbol). La Albirroja has never reached the World Cup finals, but has finished fourth in both the 2006 Sudamericano Femenino and the 2022 Copa América Femenina, the only time they were not eliminated in the Group stage. Most of Paraguay's matches are in competitions rather than friendlies, although that has started to change in recent times.

== History ==
=== 1998 South American Women's Football Championship ===
After not entering the 1991 and 1995 Copa America Femenina, Paraguay made their international debut against Uruguay at the 1998 South American Women's Football Championship. Their first official match ended in the best way, defeating the Uruguayans 3–2 in Mar del Plata in Argentina. However, losses to Argentina and Ecuador by the score of 3–0 eliminated them from the competition. They capped off their first appearance at the championship with a 3–2 win over Bolivia.

=== 2003 South American Women's Football Championship ===
Heading into their second championship, the groups were regionalised, so they were drawn into a group containing Argentina and Uruguay, where games would take place at the Estadio Padre Ernesto Martearena in Salta. With only the group winners advancing, a 3–0 loss to Argentina effectively ended their chances of progression. A 3–1 win against Uruguay, meant they finished second.

=== 2006 South American Women's Football Championship ===
For the third time, the Paraguayans arrived in Argentina for the tournament. After the format was reverted to the same one used in 1998, two groups of five. This championship was their most successful championship in their history, overcoming, Bolivia 5–1, Venezuela 3–1 and Peru 2–1 to historically advance to the second round behind Brazil. With the top two in the second round qualifying for the 2007 FIFA Women's World Cup, this was the closest Paraguay had become to making a major tournament. They started their second-round campaign with a tense and respectable 0–0 draw against the hosts Argentina. Although, they would get thumped by Brazil 6–0 in their next game, with Cristiane scoring four goals for the Brazilians. Despite the heavy loss, Paraguay knew a win over Uruguay in the last match could give them hope of an unlikely dream World Cup debut. But after holding the lead twice against Uruguay, the Uruguayans came back to lead and eventually won 3–2, meaning Paraguay were overtaken by Uruguay to finish fourth. This would remain their best tournament result until 2022. They also won the Fair Play Award.

=== 2007 Pan American Games ===
Their fourth-place finish in 2006 meant Las Guaraníes qualified for the 2007 Pan American Games in Rio de Janeiro, Brazil, their first tournament that the team had ever qualified for. However, in a group containing the United States U20 team, Mexico, Argentina and Panama, they struggled to stay competitive, losing all three of their four games, with the exception being a 1–1 draw with the Panamanians, where Francisca Agüero scored a stoppage-time equaliser. Despite the point, Paraguay still came of their group at their debut Pan Americans Games.

=== 2010 South American Women's Football Championship ===
2010 (held in Ecuador) saw Paraguay grouped with Brazil, Colombia, Venezuela and Uruguay. In the end, they had a decent tournament, garnering two wins out of four. However, they failed to recreate their 2006 performance and crashed out in the first round, finishing third in group B below Brazil and Colombia. Also, due to this result, they failed to make the 2011 Pan American Games.

=== 2014 Copa América Femenina ===
Hosted by Ecuador again, Brazil, Argentina, Chile and Bolivia were Paraguay's challengers in 2014. Las Guaraníes had a pretty unlucky tournament. After taking a shock lead against the Brazilians, they lost 4–1 in their opening match. That was followed by another defeat, this time from Argentina, by the score of 1–0. But, surprisingly, a 10–2 win over Bolivia and a 3–2 comeback win over Chile had put Paraguay into a position where all they needed was for underdogs Argentina to lose to Brazil and their passage to the second round was secured on a three-way tie. However, disappointingly, Argentina triumphed 2–0 over Brazil and would advance instead, ending Paraguay's hopes of making the 2015 FIFA Women's World Cup and 2016 Summer Olympics.

=== 2018 Copa América Femenina ===
Paraguay decided to put a bid in the 2018 edition, but lost the bidding process to Chile. There was also more optimism due to numerous Paraguay youth teams making U20 and U17 Women's World Cups between 2014 and 2018. Aiming for their first major tournament, Paraguay were third seeds and were drawn into group A where they were pitted against Chile, Colombia, Uruguay and Peru. In this evenly matched group, La Albirroja played hosts Chile and gained a hard-fought point after a 1–1 draw. Paraguay took the lead eight minutes into the second half through Gloria Villamayor. But nine minutes later, the Chileans equalised to end the game all square. Their second game involving the Peruvians gave Paraguay their first win of the tournament, winning 3–0. They were frustrated by Peru for 70 minutes but scored three goals in the last 20 to secure the win. Next, Las Guaraníes played Colombia, where a hat trick by Catalina Usme saw Paraguay be dealt a damaging 5–1 loss. That would prove costly since their main rivals in the group, Chile, had drawn against the Colombians earlier in the tournament to give them an edge over the Paraguayans. After missing the previous matchday, Paraguay overcame a 1-goal deficit to defeat Uruguay 2–1, with a ninety-second-minute goal through a volley by Amada Peralta. However, their slight hopes of progression were squashed as Chile beat Peru 5–0 to advance over the Paraguayans. Despite the disappointment, their performance was enough to secure a spot in the 2019 Pan American Games - their second appearance at the event.

=== 2019 Pan American Games ===
In their second-ever appearance at the Pan American Games, Paraguay had a much more successful tournament. After topping their group with seven points after wins over Mexico and Jamaica, plus a draw with Colombia, their semi-final match against Argentina couldn't have gone worse. They conceded three goals in the first half to comfortably lose 3–0 against Argentina. In the bronze medal match, where they played Costa Rica, a late goal by Daniela Cruz for the Costa Rican meant the Paraguayans would go home without a medal.

== Results and fixtures ==
The following is a list of match results in the last 12 months, as well as any future matches that have been scheduled.

Legend

Win Draw Lose Void or Postponed Fixture

=== 2025 ===
24 October Liga de Naciones	Argentina	3–1	Paraguay	Buenos Aires, Argentina
20:00 ART (UTC−3)	Cometti 17'; Holzheier 22'; Pereyra 45+4'	Report	Barreto 45+2'	Stadium: Estadio Diego Armando Maradona; Referee: Edina Alves (Brazil)

28 October 2025–26 CONMEBOL Liga de Naciones Femenina	Paraguay	1–2	Venezuela	Asunción, Paraguay
20:00 PYT (UTC−3)	Chamorro 37'	Report (FIFA); Report (CONMEBOL)	Carrasco 20'; García 69'	Stadium: Estadio Tigo La Huerta; Referee: Dione Rissios (Chile)

28 November 2025–26 CONMEBOL Liga de Naciones Femenina	Paraguay	1–0	Uruguay	Asunción, Paraguay
20:00 PYT (UTC−3)	C. Martínez 90+6'	Report (FIFA); Report (CONMEBOL)		Stadium: Estadio Tigo La Huerta; Referee: Laura Fortunato (Argentina)

=== 2026 ===
24 January Friendly	United States	6–0	Paraguay	Carson, United States
17:30 PDT (UTC−7)	Turner 45+3'; Sentnor 47', 57'; Martínez 53' (o.g.); Rodman 56'; Sears 72'	Report		Stadium: Dignity Health Sports Park; Attendance: 19,397; Referee: Marianela Araya (Costa Rica)

10 April 2025–26 CONMEBOL Liga de Naciones Femenina	Paraguay	2–0	Ecuador	Asunción, Paraguay
20:00 PYT (UTC−3)	Ramos 32'; Arrieta 90+8' (pen.)	Report		Stadium: Estadio Defensores del Chaco; Referee: Anahí Fernández (Uruguay)

14 April 2025–26 CONMEBOL Liga de Naciones Femenina	Peru	1–1	Paraguay	Cusco, Peru
16:00 PET (UTC−5)	Campoverde 51'	Report	Tacilla 18' (o.g.)	Stadium: Estadio Garcilaso; Referee: Adriana Farfán (Bolivia)

5 June 2025–26 CONMEBOL Liga de Naciones Femenina	Bolivia	0–8	Paraguay	El Alto, Bolivia
19:00 BOT (UTC−4)		Report	C. Martínez 19', 23', 51', 58'; Chamorro 45+1'; Garay 48'; Fernández 52'; Ayala 73'	Stadium: Estadio Municipal de El Alto; Referee: Emikar Calderas (Venezuela)

9 June 2025–26 CONMEBOL Liga de Naciones Femenina	Paraguay	3–4	Colombia	Asunción, Paraguay
20:00 PYT (UTC−3)	Quintana 3' (pen.); C. Martínez 9'; Chamorro 45+1'	Report	Guzmán 7', 89'; Restrepo 43'; Caicedo 60'	Stadium: Estadio Defensores del Chaco; Referee: Daiane Muniz (Brazil)

10 October Friendly	El Salvador	1–5	Paraguay	San Salvador, El Salvador
19:30 CST (UTC−6)	López 23'	Report	González 28', 32'; Florentin 55'; Barbosa 66'; Sánchez 76'	Stadium: Cuscatlán Stadium

13 October Friendly	El Salvador	2–3	Paraguay	San Salvador, El Salvador
20:00 CST (UTC−6)	Cerén 23'; Gutiérrez 44'	Report	Ramos 55'; Florentin 58', 81'	Stadium: Cuscatlán Stadium

== Coaching staff ==
=== Current coaching staff ===
Position	Name	Start date
Head coach	(Brazil) Fábio Fukumoto	2025

=== Manager history ===
- (Paraguay) Eduardo Poletti (2003)
- (Paraguay) Esteban von Lucken (2006)
- (Paraguay) Agustín Cabrera (2006)
- (Paraguay) Nelson Basualdo (2010)
- (Paraguay) Julio Gómez (2014)
- (Paraguay) Rubén Subeldía (2018)
- (Paraguay) Epifania Benítez (2019–2021)
- (Italy) Marcello Frigerio (2021–2023)
- (Brazil) Antonio Carlos Bona (2024–2025)
- (Brazil) Fábio Fukumoto (2025–)

== Players ==
=== Current squad ===
- The following players were called up for the 2025–26 CONMEBOL Liga de Naciones matches on 28 November and 2 December 2025.

Caps and goals are not listed; ages are as of 28 November 2025.

No.	Pos.	Player	Date of birth (age)	Club
1	GK	Cristina Recalde	29 March 1994 (age 32)	(Royal Spanish Football Federation) Villarreal
2	GK	Alicia Bobadilla	5 June 1994 (age 32)	(Argentine Football Association) Racing
3	GK	Patricia López	-	(Paraguayan Football Association) Libertad
4	GK	Soledad Belotto	14 August 2003 (age 23)	(Turkish Football Federation) Fenerbahçe
5	DF	Camila Barbosa	-	(Brazilian Football Confederation) Bahia
6	DF	Dahiana Bogarín	-	(Football Federation of Chile) Colo-Colo
7	DF	Fiorela Martínez	-	(Paraguayan Football Association) Cerrito
8	DF	María Vega	-	(Paraguayan Football Association) Club Sol
9	DF	Tania Riso	26 January 1994 (age 32)	(Paraguayan Football Association) Duruna
10	DF	Camila Arrieta	-	(Brazilian Football Confederation) Cerrado
11	DF	Liz Barreto	-	(Paraguayan Football Association) Olimpia
12	DF	Belén Talavera	-	(Paraguayan Football Association) Libertad
13	MF	Celeste Aguilera	-	(Paraguayan Football Association) Cerrito
14	MF	Cindy Ramos	1 November 2002 (age 24)	(Brazilian Football Confederation) Atlético Mineiro
16	MF	Daysy Sánchez	-	(Paraguayan Football Association) Cerrito
18	MF	Lice Chamorro	22 December 1998 (age 27)	(Royal Spanish Football Federation) Levante Badalona
19	MF	Danna Barcete	-	(Paraguayan Football Association) Cerro
20	MF	Rosa Miño	13 July 1999 (age 27)	(Ecuadorian Football Federation) Ind. Quito
21	MF	Belén Riveros	13 June 2002 (age 24)	(Royal Spanish Football Federation) Deportivo Alavés
22	MF	María Tamy	23 April 2004 (age 22)	(Paraguayan Football Association) Libertad
15	FW	Claudia Martínez	15 January 2008 (age 18)	(United States Soccer Federation) Washington Spirit
17	FW	Fátima Acosta	-	(Mexican Football Federation) Pumas
23	FW	Rebeca Fernández	1 December 1991 (age 34)	(Football Federation of Chile) U. de Chile

=== Recent call-ups ===
- The following players have been called up to a Paraguay squad in the past 12 months.

Pos.	Player	Date of birth (age)	Caps	Goals	Club	Latest call-up
GK	Cristina Recalde	-			(Albania) Vilaznia	v. Venezuela, 28 October 2025
GK	Araceli Leguizamón	6 August 2005 (age 21)			(Paraguay) Guaraní	v. Chile, 28 July 2025
DF	Daysy Bareiro	-			(Spain) Extremadura	v. Venezuela, 28 October 2025
DF	Diana Benítez	-			(Paraguay) Libertad	v. Venezuela, 28 October 2025
DF	Naomi de León	-			(Paraguay) Libertad	v. Venezuela, 28 October 2025
DF	Deisy Ojeda	-			(Mexico) Tijuana	v. Venezuela, 28 October 2025
DF	Milagros Ortiz	-			(Paraguay) Gral. Caballero	v. Venezuela, 28 October 2025
DF	Milagros Rolón	19 August 2004 (age 22)			(Paraguay) Olimpia	v. Venezuela, 28 October 2025
DF	Pamela Villalba	-			(Paraguay) Olimpia	v. Venezuela, 28 October 2025
DF	María Vecca	-			(Argentina) Rosario Central	v. Venezuela, 28 October 2025
MF	Danna Garcete	-			(Paraguay) Olimpia	v. Venezuela, 28 October 2025

== Records ==
- Active players in **bold**, statistics correct **as of 2020**.

=== Most capped players ===
#	Player	Year(s)	Caps

=== Top goalscorers ===
As of 31 October 2023

Rank	Player	Year(s)	Goals	Caps
**1**	Jessica Martinez	2014-	19	23

== Competitive record ==
=== FIFA Women's World Cup ===
FIFA Women's World Cup record
Year	Result	Pld	W	D*	L	GF	GA
(China) 1991	Did not enter						
(Sweden) 1995	Did not enter						
(United States) 1999	Did not qualify						
(United States) 2003	Did not qualify						
(China) 2007	Did not qualify						
(Germany) 2011	Did not qualify						
(Canada) 2015	Did not qualify						
(France) 2019	Did not qualify						
(Australia) (New Zealand) 2023	Did not qualify						
(Brazil) 2027	To be determined						
(Costa Rica) (Jamaica) (Mexico) (United States) 2031	To be determined						
(United Kingdom) 2035	To be determined						
Total	–	–	–	–	–	–	–

*Draws include knockout matches decided on penalty kicks.

=== Olympic Games ===
Summer Olympics record
Year	Result	Pld	W	D*	L	GF	GA
(United States) 1996	Did not enter						
(Australia) 2000	Did not qualify						
(Greece) 2004	Did not qualify						
(China) 2008	Did not qualify						
(United Kingdom) 2012	Did not qualify						
(Brazil) 2016	Did not qualify						
(Japan) 2020	Did not qualify						
(France) 2024	Did not qualify						
(United States) 2028	Did not qualify						
(Australia) 2032	To be determined						
Total	–	–	–	–	–	–	–

*Draws include knockout matches decided on penalty kicks.

=== CONMEBOL Copa América Femenina ===
CONMEBOL Copa América Femenina record
Year	Result	Pld	W	D*	L	GF	GA
(Brazil) 1991	Did not enter						
(Brazil) 1995	Did not enter						
(Argentina) 1998	Group stage	4	2	0	2	6	10
(Peru) (Argentina) (Ecuador) 2003	Group stage	2	1	0	1	3	4
(Argentina) 2006	Fourth place	7	3	1	3	13	16
(Ecuador) 2010	Group stage	4	2	0	2	8	6
(Ecuador) 2014	Group stage	4	2	0	2	14	9
(Chile) 2018	Group stage	4	2	1	1	7	7
(Colombia) 2022	Fourth place	6	3	0	3	10	12
(Ecuador) 2025	Fifth place	5	3	0	2	9	9
Total	8/10	36	18	2	16	70	73

*Draws include knockout matches decided on penalty kicks.

=== Pan American Games ===
Pan American Games record
Year	Result	Pld	W	D*	L	GF	GA
(Canada) 1999	Did not enter						
(Dominican Republic) 2003	Did not enter						
(Brazil) 2007	Group stage	4	0	1	3	4	18
(Mexico) 2011	Did not qualify						
(Canada) 2015	Did not qualify						
(Peru) 2019	Fourth place	5	2	1	2	5	6
(Chile) 2023	Fifth place	4	2	0	2	14	6
(Peru) 2027	Qualified						
(Paraguay) 2031	Qualified as host						
Total	5/9	13	4	2	7	23	30

*Draws include knockout matches decided on penalty kicks.

=== CONCACAF W Gold Cup ===
CONCACAF W Gold Cup record
Year	Result	Pld	W	D*	L	GF	GA
(United States) 2024	Quarter finals	4	2	0	2	6	9
Total	1/1	4	2	0	2	6	9

*Draws include knockout matches decided on penalty kicks.

== See also ==
- Sport in Paraguay
  - Football in Paraguay
    - Women's football in Paraguay
- Paraguay women's national under-20 football team
- Paraguay women's national under-17 football team
- Paraguay men's national football team
