= Argentina women's national under-20 football team =

Argentina Women's Under-20
- Nickname(s): Albicelestes (White and Sky blue)
- Association: Argentine Football Association
- Confederation: CONMEBOL (South America)
- Head coach: Christian Meloni
- Captain: Agustina Maldonado
- FIFA code: ARG
First colours	Second colours

First international
- Argentina 0–1 Uruguay (Encarnación, Paraguay; 11 May 2004)

Biggest win
- Benin 0–8 Argentina (Katowice, Poland; 8 September 2026)

Biggest defeat
- Argentina 0–9 North Korea (Kobe, Japan; 23 August 2012)

South American Under-20 Women's Football Championship
- Appearances: 11 (first in 2004)
- Best result: Runners-up (2006, 2008, 2012)

FIFA U-20 Women's World Cup
- Appearances: 5 (first in 2006)
- Best result: Round of 16 (2024, 2026)

The Argentina women's national under-20 football team is the representative of Argentina in FIFA sponsored tournaments that pertain to that age level. They have participated in the eight editions of the South American U-20 Women's Championship, their best result finishing runners-up in 2006, 2008 and 2012, which allowed them to qualify for the FIFA U-20 Women's World Cup in 2006, 2008 and 2012, although in all of them, they ended up being eliminated in the group stage, until 2024, when Argentina advanced to the round of 16 for the first time.

== Competitive record ==
Champions Runners-up Third place Fourth place

=== FIFA U-20 Women's World Cup ===
Year	Result	Pld	W	D	L	GF	GA	Squad
(Canada) 2002	Did not qualify							
(Thailand) 2004	Did not qualify							
(Russia) 2006	Group stage	3	1	0	2	5	9	Squad
(Chile) 2008	Group stage	3	0	1	2	1	6	Squad
(Germany) 2010	Did not qualify							
(Japan) 2012	Group stage	3	0	0	3	1	19	Squad
(Canada) 2014	Did not qualify							
(Papua New Guinea) 2016	Did not qualify							
(France) 2018	Did not qualify							
(Costa Rica) 2022	Did not qualify							
(Colombia) 2024	Round of 16	4	1	1	2	7	14	Squad
(Poland) 2026	Round of 16	4	2	0	2	11	6	Squad
Total	5/12	17	4	2	11	25	54	—

=== South American U-20 Women's Championship ===
Year	Result	Pld	W	D*	L	GF	GA	Squad
(Brazil) 2004	Group Stage	2	0	0	2	1	3	Squad
(Chile) 2006	Runners-up	7	4	2	1	15	4	Squad
(Brazil) 2008	Runners-up	7	5	0	2	14	11	Squad
(Colombia) 2010	Group Stage	4	1	0	3	2	4	Squad
(Brazil) 2012	Runners-up	7	4	1	2	15	11	Squad
(Uruguay) 2014	Group Stage	4	1	1	2	5	3	Squad
(Brazil) 2015	Fourth Place	7	3	2	2	12	12	Squad
(Ecuador) 2018	Group Stage	4	1	0	3	4	9	Squad
(Argentina) 2020	Cancelled due to COVID-19							Squad
(Chile) 2022	Group Stage	4	1	2	1	3	2	Squad
(Ecuador) 2024	Fourth Place	9	2	5	2	11	9	Squad
(Paraguay) 2026	Third Place	9	6	1	2	21	9	Squad
Total	11/11	64	28	14	22	103	77	—

=== South American Games ===
South American Games record
Year	Result	Pld	W	D*	L	GF	GA	Squad
(Chile) 2014	Senior Tournament							
(Bolivia) 2018	Group Stage	5	1	1	3	9	8	Squad
(Paraguay) 2022	Group Stage	2	0	0	2	2	7	Squad
Total	2/2	7	1	1	5	11	15	—

== Results and fixtures ==
The following is a list of recent match results, as well as any future matches that have been scheduled.

Legend

Win Draw Loss Void or postponed Fixture

=== 2025 ===
26 November 2025 Friendly	Argentina	0–0	Brazil	Ezeiza, Argentina
		Report		Stadium: Predio Lionel Andrés Messi

1 December 2025 Friendly	Argentina	3–2	Paraguay	Ezeiza, Argentina
	White; Delgado; Aguilar	Report	Villalba; Saldívar	Stadium: Predio Lionel Andrés Messi

17 December 2025 Friendly	Argentina	1–0	Colombia	Ezeiza, Argentina
	Núñez	Report		Stadium: Predio Lionel Andrés Messi

19 December 2025 Friendly	Argentina	1–0	Colombia	Ezeiza, Argentina
	Núñez	Report		Stadium: Predio Lionel Andrés Messi

=== 2026 ===
7 February 2026 South American U-20 Group B	Ecuador	1–2	Argentina	Asunción, Paraguay
18:00 (UTC−3)	Flores 15'	Report	Núñez 8'; Paz 65'	Stadium: Estadio Emiliano Ghezzi; Referee: Nohelia Giacomazzi (Uruguay)

9 February 2026 South American U-20 Group B	Argentina	4–0	Peru	Villa Elisa, Paraguay
18:00 (UTC−3)		Report	Diz 9'; Paz 34', 51'; García 62'	Stadium: Estadio Luis Alfonso Giagni; Referee: Paula Fernández (Colombia)

11 February 2026 South American U-20 Group B	Argentina	4–0	Bolivia	Asunción, Paraguay
18:00 (UTC−3)		Report	Vinhas 6'; Núñez 11' (pen.), 12'; Lombardi 48'	Stadium: Estadio Emiliano Ghezzi; Referee: Helena Cantero (Paraguay)

13 February 2026 South American U-20 Group B	Brazil	1–2	Argentina	Villa Elisa, Paraguay
18:00 (UTC−3)	Brendha 7'	Report	García 15'; Núñez 78'	Stadium: Estadio Luis Alfonso Giagni; Referee: Brenda Cisternas (Chile)

16 February 2026 South American U-20 Final stage	Argentina	2–2	Venezuela	Villa Elisa, Paraguay
20:00 (UTC−3)	Altgelt 50'; Núñez 61'	Report	Muñoz 76'; Reyes 86'	Stadium: Estadio Luis Alfonso Giagni; Referee: Elizabeth Tintaya (Peru)

19 February 2026 South American U-20 Final stage	Argentina	0–1	Ecuador	Ypané, Paraguay
22:00 (UTC−3)		Report	Vélez 45'	Stadium: CARFEM; Referee: Helena Cantero (Paraguay)

22 February 2026 South American U-20 Final stage	Brazil	4–0	Argentina	Villa Elisa, Paraguay
20:00 (UTC−3)	Evelin 3'; Clarinha 35'; Brendha 64'; Carioca 90+2'	Report		Stadium: Estadio Luis Alfonso Giagni; Referee: Nohelia Giacomazzi (Uruguay)

25 February 2026 South American U-20 Final stage	Argentina	4–0	Paraguay	Ypané, Paraguay
22:00 (UTC−3)	Paz 24'; Núñez 36' (pen.), 66'; Maldonado 66'	Report		Stadium: CARFEM

28 February 2026 South American U-20 Final stage	Colombia	0–3	Argentina	Villa Elisa, Paraguay
18:00 (UTC−3)		Report	Diz 72', 84', 90+2'	Stadium: Estadio Luis Alfonso Giagni; Referee: Elizabeth Tintaya (Peru)

14 April 2026 Friendly	Argentina	0–2	United States	Ezeiza, Argentina
		Report	Maxwell 4'; Stafford 88'	Stadium: Predio Lionel Andrés Messi

17 April 2026 Friendly	Argentina	1–3	United States	Ezeiza, Argentina
	Paz 4'		Johnson 29' (pen.), 49'; Maxwell 71'	Stadium: Predio Lionel Andrés Messi

5 September 2026 FIFA U-20 World Cup Group A	Poland	3–0	Argentina	Katowice, Poland
15:00 (UTC+2)	Związek 26'; Paz 30' (o.g.); Zielińska 90+5'	Report		Stadium: Arena Katowice; Attendance: 4,401; Referee: Myriam Marcotte (Canada)

8 September 2026 FIFA U-20 World Cup Group A	Benin	0–8	Argentina	Katowice, Poland
15:00 (UTC+2)		Report	Vinhas 16'; Diz 32', 48'; Paz 45+7', 60', 63', 66'; Aguilar 80'	Stadium: Arena Katowice; Attendance: 374; Referee: Alyssa Pennington (United States)

11 September 2026 FIFA U-20 World Cup Group A	Argentina	3–2	Mexico	Katowice, Poland
18:00 (UTC+2)	Paz 21'; Velasco Heim 78'; Delgado 90+2'	Report	Ramirez 32', 46'	Stadium: Arena Katowice; Attendance: 483; Referee: Shamirah Nabadda (Uganda)

16 September 2026 FIFA U-20 World Cup Round of 16	Argentina	v	TBD	Sosnowiec, Poland
15:00 (UTC+2)		Report		Stadium: Arena Sosnowiec

== Players ==
=== Current squad ===
The following 21 players were named in the squad for the 2026 FIFA U-20 World Cup.

No.	Pos.	Player	Date of birth (age)	Club
1	GK	Priscila Siben	3 April 2007 (age 19)	(Argentine Football Association) Banfield
12	GK	Juana Schipper	14 February 2008 (age 18)	(Argentine Football Association) Talleres
21	GK	Naila Zaninetti	26 May 2006 (age 20)	(Argentine Football Association) Unión
2	DF	Alma Velasco Heim	13 April 2006 (age 20)	(Royal Spanish Football Federation) Levante
3	DF	Carolina Ceniza	12 August 2007 (age 19)	(Argentine Football Association) River Plate
4	DF	Sofia Quiroga	15 May 2008 (age 18)	(Argentine Football Association) River Plate
6	DF	Julia Vinhas	27 May 2009 (age 17)	(Argentine Football Association) Platense
13	DF	Luzmila Ramírez	25 May 2006 (age 20)	(Argentine Football Association) Boca Juniors
14	DF	Luisana Araya	4 June 2007 (age 19)	(Argentine Football Association) Belgrano
15	DF	Morena Calvo	29 May 2006 (age 20)	(Argentine Football Association) Boca Juniors
5	MF	Agustina Maldonado (captain)	19 March 2009 (age 17)	(Argentine Football Association) River Plate
8	MF	Julieta Martínez	3 October 2007 (age 19)	(Argentine Football Association) Boca Juniors
10	MF	Brisa Jara	14 August 2007 (age 19)	(Argentine Football Association) Talleres
16	MF	Camila Ochoa	28 March 2007 (age 19)	(Argentine Football Association) Independiente
7	FW	Julieta Aguilar	29 July 2010 (age 16)	(Argentine Football Association) Newell's Old Boys
9	FW	Mercedes Diz	24 February 2009 (age 17)	(Argentine Football Association) River Plate
11	FW	Dolores Delgado Rossi	17 April 2008 (age 18)	(Royal Spanish Football Federation) Atlético Madrid
17	FW	Violeta Álvarez	28 April 2009 (age 17)	(Argentine Football Association) Boca Juniors
18	FW	Pía Álvarez	31 October 2008 (age 18)	(Argentine Football Association) Independiente
19	FW	Annika Paz	16 November 2008 (age 17)	(Italian Football Federation) Inter Milan
20	FW	Giselle White	29 May 2008 (age 18)	(United States Soccer Federation) University of Oregon

== Coaching staff ==
Position	Name
Head coach	(Argentina) Christian Meloni
Assistant coach	(Argentina) Esteban Pizzi
Assistant coach	(Argentina) Clarisa Huber
Fitness coach	(Argentina) Gabriel Denava
Goalkeeping coach	(Argentina) Enrique Yamashita

== Head-to-head record ==
The following table shows Argentina's head-to-head record in the FIFA U-20 Women's World Cup.

Opponent	Pld	W	D	L	GF	GA	GD	Win %
Benin	1	1	0	0	8	0	+8	100.00
Canada	1	0	0	1	0	6	−6	0.00
China	1	0	1	0	0	0	+0	0.00
Costa Rica	1	1	0	0	1	0	+1	100.00
DR Congo	1	1	0	0	4	0	+4	100.00
France	2	0	0	2	1	8	−7	0.00
Germany	1	0	0	1	1	5	−4	0.00
Mexico	1	1	0	0	3	2	+1	100.00
Netherlands	1	0	1	0	3	3	+0	0.00
Norway	1	0	0	1	1	4	−3	0.00
North Korea	2	0	0	2	2	15	−13	0.00
Poland	1	0	0	1	0	3	−3	0.00
South Korea	1	0	0	1	0	1	−1	0.00
United States	2	0	0	2	1	7	−6	0.00
Total	17	4	2	11	25	54	−29	23.53

== See also ==
- Sport in Argentina
  - Football in Argentina
    - Women's football in Argentina
- Argentina women's national football team
- Argentina women's national under-17 football team
- Argentina–Brazil football rivalry
