= 2026 South American Under-20 Women's Championship squads =

This article describes about the squads for the 2026 South American Under-20 Women's Football Championship.

== Group A ==
=== Chile ===
The squad was announced on 30 January 2026.

Head coach: Nicolás Bravo Martínez

No.	Pos.	Player	Date of birth (age)	Club
1	GK	Martina Funck	18 June 2007 (aged 18)	(Football Federation of Chile) Universidad de Chile
2	DF	Arantza Suazo	23 February 2006 (aged 19)	(Football Federation of Chile) Universidad de Chile
3	DF	Catalina Arias	24 May 2007 (aged 18)	(Football Federation of Chile) Colo-Colo
4	DF	Gabriela García	25 February 2006 (aged 19)	(Football Federation of Chile) Universidad de Chile
5	MF	Amparo Abarca	8 August 2009 (aged 16)	(Football Federation of Chile) Universidad Católica
6	DF	Emma González	27 December 2006 (aged 19)	(Football Federation of Chile) Universidad de Chile
7	FW	Vaitiare Pardo	20 August 2007 (aged 18)	(Football Federation of Chile) Universidad Católica
8	MF	Valentina Peña	10 August 2006 (aged 19)	(Football Federation of Chile) Universidad Católica
9	FW	Pamela Cabezas	10 July 2007 (aged 18)	(Football Federation of Chile) Universidad Católica
10	MF	Ambar Figueroa	24 October 2007 (aged 18)	(Football Federation of Chile) Universidad Católica
11	FW	Francisca Vargas	21 July 2006 (aged 19)	(Football Federation of Chile) Universidad de Chile
12	GK	Oriana Cristancho	2 October 2009 (aged 16)	(Football Federation of Chile) Universidad de Chile
13	DF	Constanza González	18 September 2010 (aged 15)	(Football Federation of Chile) Colo-Colo
14	DF	Ashley López	4 July 2007 (aged 18)	(Football Federation of Chile) Coquimbo Unido
15	DF	Lauryn Morales	6 March 2008 (aged 17)	(Football Federation of Chile) Universidad de Chile
16	DF	Arantza Suazo	23 February 2006 (aged 19)	(Football Federation of Chile) Universidad de Chile
17	MF	Anays Miranda	30 September 2008 (aged 17)	(Football Federation of Chile) Santiago Wanderers
18	MF	Amaral Farías	8 January 2010 (aged 16)	(Football Federation of Chile) Colo-Colo
19	FW	Katary Cadiz	25 November 2007 (aged 18)	(Football Federation of Chile) Universidad de Chile
20	FW	Nicole Carter	13 August 2008 (aged 17)	(Football Federation of Chile) Colo-Colo
21	FW	Javiera Coronado	25 September 2006 (aged 19)	(Football Federation of Chile) Colo-Colo
22	GK	Marian Jerez	10 January 2006 (aged 20)	(Football Federation of Chile) Santiago Wanderers

=== Colombia ===
The squad was announced on 31 January 2026.

Head coach: Carlos Paniagua

No.	Pos.	Player	Date of birth (age)	Club
1	GK	Luisa Agudelo	27 March 2007 (aged 18)	(United States Soccer Federation) San Diego Wave
2	DF	Sara Bohórquez	30 October 2006 (aged 19)	(Colombian Football Federation) Independiente Santa Fe
3	DF	Lina Arboleda	5 August 2006 (aged 19)	(Colombian Football Federation) Millonarios
4	DF	Maria Zapata	7 September 2007 (aged 18)	(Colombian Football Federation) Once Caldas
5	DF	María Torres	1 September 2006 (aged 19)	(Colombian Football Federation) Independiente Medellín
6	MF	Eliana Agudelo	19 February 2006 (aged 19)	(Colombian Football Federation) Independiente Medellín
7	FW	Isabella Díaz	17 November 2007 (aged 18)	(Colombian Football Federation) Independiente Santa Fe
8	MF	Mariana Mosquera	18 April 2007 (aged 18)	(Colombian Football Federation) Atlético Nacional
9	FW	Marleidy Cossio	18 March 2006 (aged 19)	(Argentine Football Association) Racing Club
10	FW	Mariana Silva	21 August 2007 (aged 18)	(Colombian Football Federation) Independiente Santa Fe
11	FW	Maithe López	24 January 2007 (aged 19)	(Canadian Soccer Association) Vancouver Rise
12	GK	Jimena Ospina	26 October 2006 (aged 19)	(Colombian Football Federation) Atlético Nacional
13	MF	Isabel Weiner	6 February 2007 (aged 18)	(United States Soccer Federation) Columbia University
14	DF	Fernanda Viafara	22 July 2006 (aged 19)	(Colombian Football Federation) Millonarios
15	DF	Sophia Posada	23 January 2007 (aged 19)	(Colombian Football Federation) Independiente Santa Fe
16	MF	Juana Ortegón	6 August 2006 (aged 19)	(Colombian Football Federation) Independiente Santa Fe
17	FW	Nikol Rojas	21 March 2007 (aged 18)	(Colombian Football Federation) Independiente Santa Fe
18	MF	Marian Sterling	19 August 2007 (aged 18)	(Colombian Football Federation) Atlético Nacional
20	DF	Laura Tovar	23 December 2006 (aged 19)	(Colombian Football Federation) Independiente Santa Fe
21	MF	Isis De La Cruz	4 July 2007 (aged 18)	(Colombian Football Federation) Independiente Santa Fe
22	GK	Sofía Prieto	26 September 2009 (aged 16)	(Colombian Football Federation) Deportivo Cali

=== Paraguay ===
The squad was announced on 30 January 2026.

Head coach: Gustavo Roma

No.	Pos.	Player	Date of birth (age)	Club
1	GK	Tamara Amarilla	22 January 2009 (aged 17)	(Paraguayan Football Association) Cerro Porteño
2	DF	Erika Figueredo	14 May 2008 (aged 17)	(Paraguayan Football Association) Cerro Porteño
3	DF	Johana Medina	19 February 2006 (aged 19)	
4	DF	Ximena Moreno	28 April 2008 (aged 17)	(Paraguayan Football Association) Olimpia
5	MF	Kiara Florentín	27 November 2008 (aged 17)	(Paraguayan Football Association) Nacional/Humaitá
6	DF	Nayeli Torres	2 August 2006 (aged 19)	(Brazilian Football Confederation) São Paulo
7	DF	Luz Cardozo	19 July 2006 (aged 19)	(Paraguayan Football Association) Libertad
8	MF	Maite Mussi	13 July 2008 (aged 17)	(Paraguayan Football Association) Olimpia
9	FW	Milagros Ortiz	7 May 2007 (aged 18)	(Paraguayan Football Association) General Caballero
10	MF	Pamela Villalba	2 February 2006 (aged 20)	(Paraguayan Football Association) Olimpia
11	FW	Claudia Martínez	15 January 2008 (aged 18)	(United States Soccer Federation) Washington Spirit
12	GK	Estefani Ruiz	16 May 2009 (aged 16)	(Paraguayan Football Association) Olimpia
13	DF	Bárbara Olmedo	26 January 2008 (aged 18)	(Paraguayan Football Association) Olimpia
14	DF	Luz Paiva	18 December 2008 (aged 17)	(Paraguayan Football Association) Cerro Porteño
15	DF	Jazmín Pintos	3 April 2008 (aged 17)	(Paraguayan Football Association) Cerro Porteño
16	MF	Nataly Lezcano	26 March 2007 (aged 18)	(Paraguayan Football Association) Libertad
17	MF	Yanina Sosa	18 May 2006 (aged 19)	(Paraguayan Football Association) Cerro Porteño
18	MF	Fiorella Aquino	31 March 2008 (aged 17)	(Paraguayan Football Association) Libertad
19	MF	Daniela González	20 March 2006 (aged 19)	(Paraguayan Football Association) Guaraní
20	FW	Diana Benítez	30 March 2007 (aged 18)	(Paraguayan Football Association) Libertad
21	FW	Alison Bareiro	3 January 2008 (aged 18)	(Paraguayan Football Association) Olimpia
22	FW	Larissa Saldívar	6 January 2007 (aged 19)	(Paraguayan Football Association) Guaraní

=== Uruguay ===
The squad was announced on 28 January 2026.

Head coach: Marcel Rauss

No.	Pos.	Player	Date of birth (age)	Club
1	GK	Romina Olmedo	7 October 2006 (aged 19)	(Uruguayan Football Association) Defensor Sporting
2	DF	Rocío Morel	11 November 2006 (aged 19)	(Uruguayan Football Association) Peñarol
3	MF	Valentina Cousillas	5 January 2006 (aged 20)	(Uruguayan Football Association) Nacional
4	DF	Pierina González	4 March 2006 (aged 19)	(Uruguayan Football Association) Nacional
5	MF	Catalina Márquez	25 October 2007 (aged 18)	(Uruguayan Football Association) Defensor Sporting
6	FW	Federica Calvo	21 March 2008 (aged 17)	(Uruguayan Football Association) Nacional
7	FW	Clara Güell	1 July 2006 (aged 19)	(Brazilian Football Confederation) Internacional
8	DF	Antonella Cordero	2 June 2009 (aged 16)	(Uruguayan Football Association) Defensor Sporting
9	FW	Agustina Gómez	15 February 2007 (aged 18)	(Uruguayan Football Association) Liverpool
10	MF	Ilana Guedes	13 March 2007 (aged 18)	(Uruguayan Football Association) Liverpool
11	DF	Valentina Pereira	30 May 2006 (aged 19)	(Royal Spanish Football Federation) Femarguín
12	GK	Renata Da Rosa	8 May 2006 (aged 19)	(Uruguayan Football Association) Defensor Sporting
13	DF	Melisa Alfonso	18 June 2006 (aged 19)	(Uruguayan Football Association) Nacional
14	MF	Julieta Mozejko	23 November 2007 (aged 18)	(Uruguayan Football Association) Danubio
15	MF	Agustina Álvez	14 September 2007 (aged 18)	(Uruguayan Football Association) Nacional
16	MF	Allegra Rodríguez	3 October 2006 (aged 19)	(Uruguayan Football Association) Peñarol
17	MF	Julieta Osores	31 October 2007 (aged 18)	(Uruguayan Football Association) Liverpool
18	DF	Maisha Vázquez	19 April 2009 (aged 16)	(Uruguayan Football Association) Nacional
19	FW	Erika Vidiella	3 January 2007 (aged 19)	(Uruguayan Football Association) Peñarol
20	MF	Sofía Olivera	13 November 2006 (aged 19)	(Uruguayan Football Association) Nacional
21	FW	Isabela Pérez	28 February 2006 (aged 19)	(Uruguayan Football Association) Nacional
22	DF	Rocío Frachia	14 October 2009 (aged 16)	(Uruguayan Football Association) Liverpool

=== Venezuela ===
The squad was announced on 26 January 2026.

Head coach: Ángel Hualde

No.	Pos.	Player	Date of birth (age)	Club
1	GK	Ivana Veloz	11 September 2009 (aged 16)	(Venezuelan Football Federation) Secasports
2	DF	Daryelis Adrián	16 September 2008 (aged 17)	
3	DF	Gilary Díaz	24 October 2008 (aged 17)	(Venezuelan Football Federation) Caracas
4	DF	Zoraida Blanco	14 June 2006 (aged 19)	(Venezuelan Football Federation) Caracas
5	MF	Anggely Muñoz	11 June 2008 (aged 17)	(Venezuelan Football Federation) Deportivo Táchira
6	DF	Ariana Cova	6 August 2008 (aged 17)	(Venezuelan Football Federation) Caracas
7	MF	Melanie Chirinos	20 March 2008 (aged 17)	(Venezuelan Football Federation) Adiffem
8	MF	Camille Carniglia	13 November 2007 (aged 18)	(United States Soccer Federation) Cowley Community College
9	FW	Genesis Hernández	19 June 2006 (aged 19)	(United States Soccer Federation) Southeastern University
10	FW	Ailing Herrera	15 July 2008 (aged 17)	(Venezuelan Football Federation) Caracas
11	FW	Susanna Calvetti	20 June 2006 (aged 19)	(Venezuelan Football Federation) Secasports
12	DF	Paola Gómez	21 March 2007 (aged 18)	(United States Soccer Federation) Trinity Valley Community College
13	DF	Estefany Neiro	13 September 2008 (aged 17)	(Venezuelan Football Federation) Adiffem
14	MF	Gellinott Reyes	31 October 2006 (aged 19)	(Venezuelan Football Federation) Caracas
15	DF	Claudia Pérez	10 July 2008 (aged 17)	(Venezuelan Football Federation) Deportivo Miranda
16	DF	Amanda Gugliotta	26 September 2008 (aged 17)	(United States Soccer Federation) Miami Prime
17	FW	Fabiana Hernández	10 July 2007 (aged 18)	(Peruvian Football Federation) Alianza Lima
18	MF	Orliany Durán	8 August 2009 (aged 16)	(Venezuelan Football Federation) ULA
19	FW	Francelis Graterol	29 March 2006 (aged 19)	(Colombian Football Federation) Independiente Santa Fe
20	FW	Marielbis Gutiérrez	20 December 2008 (aged 17)	(Venezuelan Football Federation) Academia Nacional
21	MF	Karlis Durán	1 July 2006 (aged 19)	(Venezuelan Football Federation) Caracas
22	GK	Valeria Rebanales	25 August 2009 (aged 16)	(Venezuelan Football Federation) Adiffem

== Group B ==
=== Argentina ===
The squad was announced on 31 January 2026.

Head coach: Christian Meloni

No.	Pos.	Player	Date of birth (age)	Club
1	GK	Paulina Aprile	13 May 2008 (aged 17)	(Argentine Football Association) Rosario Central
2	MF	Pilar Sabransky	4 August 2007 (aged 18)	(Argentine Football Association) Newell's Old Boys
3	DF	Carolina Ceniza	12 August 2007 (aged 18)	(Argentine Football Association) River Plate
4	DF	Juana Cangaro	13 February 2006 (aged 19)	(Argentine Football Association) River Plate
5	MF	Valentina Tesio	6 February 2006 (aged 19)	(Argentine Football Association) Boca Juniors
6	DF	Valentina Ahumada	7 May 2007 (aged 18)	(Argentine Football Association) Boca Juniors
7	FW	Julieta Aguilar	29 July 2010 (aged 15)	(Argentine Football Association) Newell's Old Boys
8	MF	Agustina Maldonado	19 March 2009 (aged 16)	(Argentine Football Association) River Plate
9	FW	Kishi Núñez	17 May 2006 (aged 19)	(Argentine Football Association) Boca Juniors
10	FW	Francisca Altgelt	11 May 2006 (aged 19)	(Argentine Football Association) River Plate
11	FW	Mercedes Diz	24 February 2009 (aged 16)	(Argentine Football Association) River Plate
12	GK	Priscila Siben	3 April 2007 (aged 18)	(Argentine Football Association) Banfield
13	DF	Luzmila Ramírez	25 May 2006 (aged 19)	(Argentine Football Association) Boca Juniors
14	DF	Luisina Araya	4 June 2007 (aged 18)	(Argentine Football Association) Belgrano
15	MF	Julieta Martínez	3 October 2007 (aged 18)	(Argentine Football Association) Boca Juniors
16	MF	Julia Vinhas	27 May 2009 (aged 16)	(Argentine Football Association) Platense
17	MF	Denise García	15 March 2006 (aged 19)	(Royal Spanish Football Federation) Getafe
18	FW	Brisa Jara	14 August 2007 (aged 18)	(Argentine Football Association) Talleres
19	FW	Annika Paz	16 November 2008 (aged 17)	(Italian Football Federation) Inter
20	FW	Delfina Lombardi	17 March 2006 (aged 19)	(United States Soccer Federation) Florida International University
21	FW	Violeta Álvarez	28 April 2009 (aged 16)	(Argentine Football Association) Boca Juniors
22	GK	Juana Schipper	14 February 2008 (aged 17)	(Argentine Football Association) Talleres

=== Bolivia ===
The squad was announced on 2 February 2026.

Head coach: Jury Villarroel

No.	Pos.	Player	Date of birth (age)	Club
1	GK	Melody Merino	5 November 2007 (aged 18)	(Bolivian Football Federation) Aurora
2	DF	Sara Villca	29 May 2006 (aged 19)	(Bolivian Football Federation) Exótico Premium
3	DF	Mariana Quispe	5 June 2008 (aged 17)	
4	DF	Alejandra Arellano	24 August 2009 (aged 16)	(Bolivian Football Federation) Universitario
5	MF	Issela Plata	12 March 2006 (aged 19)	(Bolivian Football Federation) Always Ready
6	MF	Jhadira Núñez	2 February 2009 (aged 17)	(Bolivian Football Federation) Exótico Premium
7	FW	Thalia Rueda	2 July 2009 (aged 16)	(Bolivian Football Federation) Inter Stars Rush
8	FW	Karla Paz	16 February 2006 (aged 19)	(Bolivian Football Federation) Oriente Petrolero
9	FW	Briana Rico	11 September 2008 (aged 17)	
10	MF	Olivia Tamaki	18 September 2007 (aged 18)	
11	MF	Marina Morato	4 August 2008 (aged 17)	(Italian Football Federation) Lazio
12	GK	Isabella Torrez	22 August 2008 (aged 17)	(Bolivian Football Federation) Calleja
13	DF	Soraya Sánchez	2 April 2007 (aged 18)	(Bolivian Football Federation) Davema
14	DF	Casiana Beyuma	1 April 2007 (aged 18)	(Bolivian Football Federation) The Strongest
15	MF	Marcia Huallpa	18 March 2009 (aged 16)	(Bolivian Football Federation) Leonas
16	MF	Gabriela Llanes	6 July 2008 (aged 17)	(Bolivian Football Federation) Real Tomayapo
17	MF	Jhoselyn Michel	1 December 2008 (aged 17)	(Bolivian Football Federation) Real Tomayapo
18	FW	Maria Ibañez	29 October 2007 (aged 18)	(Bolivian Football Federation) Wilstermann
19	FW	Thiara Renjifo	23 May 2009 (aged 16)	(Bolivian Football Federation) Inter Stars Rush
20	MF	Dione Hurtado	26 January 2009 (aged 17)	(Bolivian Football Federation) Deportivo Ita
21	FW	Graciela Suyo	25 March 2007 (aged 18)	(Bolivian Football Federation) Nacional Potosí
22	FW	Isabel Arroyo	24 February 2006 (aged 19)	(Bolivian Football Federation) Oriente Petrolero

=== Brazil ===
The squad was announced on 29 January 2026.

Head coach: Camilla Orlando

No.	Pos.	Player	Date of birth (age)	Club
1	GK	Isa Faichel	7 March 2007 (aged 18)	(Brazilian Football Confederation) Ferroviária
2	DF	Samara	4 October 2006 (aged 19)	(Brazilian Football Confederation) Santos
3	DF	Sofia	2 August 2007 (aged 18)	(Brazilian Football Confederation) Flamengo
4	DF	Ana Bia	30 April 2006 (aged 19)	(Brazilian Football Confederation) São Paulo
5	MF	Nayara	23 October 2006 (aged 19)	(Brazilian Football Confederation) Botafogo
6	DF	Isa Nunes	12 June 2007 (aged 18)	(Brazilian Football Confederation) Flamengo
7	FW	Gisele	20 May 2007 (aged 18)	(Brazilian Football Confederation) Grêmio
8	MF	Julia Martins	29 June 2007 (aged 18)	(Brazilian Football Confederation) Grêmio
9	FW	Maria Da Silva	26 February 2006 (aged 19)	(Brazilian Football Confederation) Fluminense
10	MF	Vitorinha	20 November 2006 (aged 19)	(Brazilian Football Confederation) São Paulo
11	FW	Dudinha	27 January 2006 (aged 20)	(Brazilian Football Confederation) Ferroviária
12	GK	Elu	8 June 2006 (aged 19)	(Brazilian Football Confederation) São Paulo
13	DF	Sara	27 November 2007 (aged 18)	(Brazilian Football Confederation) Santos
14	MF	Kaylane Vieira	8 December 2008 (aged 17)	(Brazilian Football Confederation) Flamengo
15	DF	Bia Martins	17 May 2006 (aged 19)	(Brazilian Football Confederation) Internacional
16	MF	Clarinha	16 January 2006 (aged 20)	(Portuguese Football Federation) Benfica
17	FW	Evelin Bonifácio	8 April 2008 (aged 17)	(Brazilian Football Confederation) Santos
18	FW	Tainá	30 November 2006 (aged 19)	(Brazilian Football Confederation) Ferroviária
19	FW	Brendha	17 December 2006 (aged 19)	(Brazilian Football Confederation) Flamengo
20	MF	Adrielly	16 January 2007 (aged 19)	(Brazilian Football Confederation) Fluminense
21	MF	Emilly	11 February 2007 (aged 18)	(Brazilian Football Confederation) Flamengo
22	DF	Thay	20 March 2006 (aged 19)	(Brazilian Football Confederation) Botafogo

=== Ecuador ===
The squad was announced on 26 January 2026.

Head coach: Eduardo Moscoso

No.	Pos.	Player	Date of birth (age)	Club
1	GK	Doménica Palacios	19 October 2007 (aged 18)	
2	DF	Noemí Camacho	10 April 2007 (aged 18)	(Ecuadorian Football Federation) Universidad Católica
3	DF	Maite Zambrano	13 October 2008 (aged 17)	(Ecuadorian Football Federation) Independiente del Valle
4	MF	Kathleen Mendoza	19 July 2006 (aged 19)	(Ecuadorian Football Federation) Universidad Católica
5	MF	Evelyn Burgos	19 April 2007 (aged 18)	(Ecuadorian Football Federation) Independiente del Valle
6	FW	Scarlet Garaicoa	25 July 2008 (aged 17)	(Ecuadorian Football Federation) Barcelona
7	MF	Maritxell Cazares	21 August 2006 (aged 19)	(Ecuadorian Football Federation) LDU Quito
8	MF	Fiorella Pico	10 June 2007 (aged 18)	(Ecuadorian Football Federation) Independiente del Valle
9	DF	Caprice Chiuchiolo	17 April 2007 (aged 18)	(United States Soccer Federation) Grand Canyon University
10	MF	Mary Guerra	7 March 2008 (aged 17)	(Ecuadorian Football Federation) Independiente del Valle
11	MF	Dariana Morán	29 March 2007 (aged 18)	(Ecuadorian Football Federation) Independiente del Valle
12	GK	Melany Pozo	13 May 2007 (aged 18)	(Ecuadorian Football Federation) Deportivo Ibarra
13	FW	Josenka Vélez	4 July 2006 (aged 19)	(Ecuadorian Football Federation) LDU Quito
14	FW	Aireen Mogro	18 May 2006 (aged 19)	(Ecuadorian Football Federation) Universidad Católica
15	MF	Abigail Villacis	19 May 2008 (aged 17)	(Ecuadorian Football Federation) Independiente del Valle
16	MF	Xiomara Alcívar	14 September 2008 (aged 17)	(Ecuadorian Football Federation) LDU Quito
17	DF	Jenifer Zambrano	15 March 2006 (aged 19)	(Ecuadorian Football Federation) LDU Quito
18	MF	Rosa Flores	26 June 2006 (aged 19)	(Ecuadorian Football Federation) LDU Quito
19	MF	Erika López	19 December 2008 (aged 17)	(Ecuadorian Football Federation) Ñañas
20	FW	Emily Delgado	20 September 2008 (aged 17)	(Ecuadorian Football Federation) Universidad Católica
21	FW	Emily Vargas	7 June 2008 (aged 17)	(Ecuadorian Football Federation) Barcelona
22	GK	Dayarlin Alcívar	25 May 2006 (aged 19)	(Ecuadorian Football Federation) LDU Quito

=== Peru ===
The squad was announced on 2 February 2026.

Head coach: Gastón Camargo

No.	Pos.	Player	Date of birth (age)	Club
1	GK	Kaylee Rybinski	4 April 2009 (aged 16)	(Peruvian Football Federation) Alianza Lima
2	DF	Luana Chamochumbi	20 February 2006 (aged 19)	(Peruvian Football Federation) Universitario
3	DF	Ana Deletre	2 July 2009 (aged 16)	(French Football Federation) Stade de Reims
4	DF	Carmen Campos	19 December 2006 (aged 19)	(Peruvian Football Federation) Universitario
5	MF	Sarah Reyes	19 May 2006 (aged 19)	(United States Soccer Federation) New Jersey City
6	DF	Annabella Kellerman	16 November 2006 (aged 19)	(United States Soccer Federation) Los Angeles Surf
7	FW	Guadalupe Rodríguez	30 April 2009 (aged 16)	(Peruvian Football Federation) Alianza Lima
8	MF	Lucerito Huamán	12 December 2006 (aged 19)	(Peruvian Football Federation) Alianza Lima
9	FW	Claudia Ipanaque	22 October 2006 (aged 19)	(Peruvian Football Federation) Universitario
10	MF	Alba Soto	9 December 2008 (aged 17)	(Peruvian Football Federation) Melgar
11	MF	María Espejo	24 November 2006 (aged 19)	(Peruvian Football Federation) Universitario
12	GK	Laura Miranda	18 August 2007 (aged 18)	(Royal Spanish Football Federation) Futbolellas
13	MF	Khloe Olano	12 April 2008 (aged 17)	(United States Soccer Federation) Cedar Stars Academy
14	MF	Alexa Zevallos	1 July 2008 (aged 17)	(Peruvian Football Federation) Melgar
15	MF	Sofía Aguayo	12 January 2007 (aged 19)	(United States Soccer Federation) Mississippi State University
16	MF	Sofía Ayala	7 September 2006 (aged 19)	(Argentine Football Association) Huracán
17	MF	Dominic Escudero	2 October 2008 (aged 17)	(Peruvian Football Federation) Yanapuma
18	MF	Isabella Kaemmerer	18 June 2007 (aged 18)	(United States Soccer Federation) University of Hawaiʻi at Mānoa
19	FW	Camila Pío	13 April 2008 (aged 17)	(Peruvian Football Federation) Universitario
20	DF	Angela Laynes	2 November 2007 (aged 18)	(Peruvian Football Federation) Alianza Lima
21	DF	Alejandra Salazar	30 September 2009 (aged 16)	(Peruvian Football Federation) Killas
22	FW	Valeria Luzio	22 March 2006 (aged 19)	(United States Soccer Federation) Rochester Institute of Technology
