= 2026 South American Under-20 Women's Football Championship =

12th edition of the South American Under-20 Women's Football Championship

CONMEBOL Sub 20 Femenino 2026

Tournament details
- Host country: Paraguay
- Dates: 4 – 28 February
- Teams: 10 (from 1 confederation)
- Venue: 2 (in 2 host cities)

Final positions
- Champions: Brazil (11th title)
- Runners-up: Ecuador
- Third place: Argentina
- Fourth place: Colombia

Tournament statistics
- Matches played: 35
- Goals scored: 96 (2.74 per match)
- Top scorer: (Argentina) Kishi Núñez (7 goals)

The 2026 South American Under-20 Women's Football Championship, officially the 2026 CONMEBOL Sub20 Femenina, was the 12th edition of the South American U-20 Women's Championship (CONMEBOL Sub20 Femenina), the biennial international youth football championship organised by CONMEBOL for the women's under-20 national teams of South America. It was held in Paraguay from 4 to 28 February 2026.

The top four teams of the tournament qualified for the 2026 FIFA U-20 Women's World Cup in Poland as the CONMEBOL representatives.

Brazil were the defending champions having won the title in 2024.

== Teams ==
All ten CONMEBOL member national teams were eligible to enter the tournament.

Team	Appearance	Previous best top-4 performance
Argentina	12th	Runners-up (2006, 2008, 2012)
Bolivia	12th	Fourth place (2004, 2014)
Brazil (holders)	12th	Champions (2004, 2006, 2008, 2010, 2012, 2014, 2015, 2018, 2022, 2024)
Chile	12th	Fourth place (2008, 2010)
Colombia	12th	Runners-up (2010, 2022)
Ecuador	12th	Third place (2004)
Paraguay (host)	12th	Runners-up (2004, 2014, 2018, 2024)
Peru	12th	Fourth place (2006)
Uruguay	12th	Third place (2022)
Venezuela	12th	Runners-up (2015)

== First stage ==
In the first stage, the teams were ranked according to points earned (3 points for a win, 1 point for a draw, 0 points for a loss). If tied on points, tiebreakers were applied in the following order (Regulations Article 20):

1. Head-to-head result in games between tied teams;
  1. Points in the matches played between the teams in question;
  2. Goal difference in the matches played between the teams in question;
  3. Number of goals scored in the matches played between the teams in question;
2. Goal difference in all group matches;
3. Number of goals scored in all group matches;
4. Fewest red cards received;
5. Fewest yellow cards received
6. Drawing of lots.

The top three teams of each group advanced to the final stage.

The draw was held on 11 March 2026.

All match times were in PYT (UTC−3), as listed by CONMEBOL.

=== Group A ===
Pos	Team	Pld	W	D	L	GF	GA	GD	Pts	Qualification
1	Colombia	4	2	2	0	3	0	+3	8	Final stage
2	Venezuela	4	2	1	1	4	1	+3	7	Final stage
3	Paraguay (H)	4	1	2	1	4	2	+2	5	Final stage
4	Uruguay	4	1	1	2	1	4	−3	4	
5	Chile	4	0	2	2	0	5	−5	2	

Source: CONMEBOL
(H) Hosts
4 February 2026
18:00

Paraguay	4–0	Chile
Mussi 8'; Martínez 45', 63'; Villalba 71'	Report

Estadio Luis Alfonso Giagni, Villa Elisa
Referee: Rejane Caetano (Brazil)
4 February 2026
18:00

Uruguay	0–2	Venezuela
	Report	Hernández 7', 10'

Estadio Emiliano Ghezzi, Asunción
Referee: Adriana Alvarez (Argentina)

6 February 2026
18:00

Chile	0–0	Colombia
	Report

Estadio Luis Alfonso Giagni, Villa Elisa
Referee: Stefani Escobar (Venezuela)
6 February 2026
18:00

Uruguay	0–0	Paraguay
	Report

Estadio Emiliano Ghezzi, Asunción

8 February 2026
18:00

Chile	0–1	Uruguay
	Report	Cordero 72'

Estadio Emiliano Ghezzi, Asunción
8 February 2026
18:00

Colombia	1–0	Venezuela
López 81'	Report

Estadio Luis Alfonso Giagni, Villa Elisa

10 February 2026
18:00

Venezuela	2–0	Paraguay
Hernández 72'; Chirinos 86' (pen.)	Report

Estadio Luis Alfonso Giagni, Villa Elisa
10 February 2026
18:00

Colombia	2–0	Uruguay
López 41'; Viáfara 84'	Report

Estadio Emiliano Ghezzi, Asunción

12 February 2026
18:00

Colombia	0–0	Paraguay
	Report

Estadio Luis Alfonso Giagni, Villa Elisa
12 February 2026
18:00

Chile	0–0	Venezuela
	Report

Estadio Emiliano Ghezzi, Asunción

=== Group B ===
Pos	Team	Pld	W	D	L	GF	GA	GD	Pts	Qualification
1	Argentina	4	4	0	0	12	2	+10	12	Final stage
2	Brazil	4	3	0	1	15	4	+11	9	Final stage
3	Ecuador	4	2	0	2	13	5	+8	6	Final stage
4	Peru	4	1	0	3	2	14	−12	3	
5	Bolivia	4	0	0	4	0	17	−17	0	

Source: CONMEBOL
5 February 2026
18:00

Brazil	3–2	Ecuador
Carioca 60'; Brendha 80'; Beatriz 90+3'	Report	Vélez 45'; Cazares 89' (pen.)

Estadio Luis Alfonso Giagni, Villa Elisa
Referee: Paula Fernández (Colombia)
5 February 2026
18:00

Bolivia	0–2	Peru
	Report	Rodríguez 55'; Espejo 61'

Estadio Emiliano Ghezzi, Asunción
Referee: Helena Cantero (Paraguay)

7 February 2026
18:00

Bolivia	0–5	Brazil
	Report	Clarinha 5'; Evelin 26' 36'; Vitorinha 68'; Gisele 90'

Estadio Luis Alfonso Giagni, Villa Elisa
7 February 2026
18:00

Ecuador	1–2	Argentina
Flores 15'	Report	Núñez 8'; Paz 65'

Estadio Emiliano Ghezzi, Asunción

9 February 2026
18:00

Argentina	4–0	Peru
Diz 9'; Paz 34', 51'; García 62'	Report

Estadio Luis Alfonso Giagni, Villa Elisa
9 February 2026
18:00

Ecuador	6–0	Bolivia
Vélez 17', 89'; Flores 42'; Burgos 63' (pen.); Garaicoa 84'; Alcívar 90+2'	Report

Estadio Emiliano Ghezzi, Asunción

11 February 2026
18:00

Peru	0–6	Brazil
	Report	Thaynara 16'; Noguiera 35', 76'; Adrielly 43'; Dudinha 45+2'; Brendha 78'

Estadio Luis Alfonso Giagni, Villa Elisa
11 February 2026
18:00

Argentina	4–0	Bolivia
Vinhas 6'; Núñez 11' (pen.), 12'; Lombardi 48'	Report

Estadio Emiliano Ghezzi, Asunción

13 February 2026
18:00

Brazil	1–2	Argentina
Brendha 7'	Report	García 15'; Núñez 78'

Estadio Luis Alfonso Giagni, Villa Elisa
13 February 2026
18:00

Peru	0–4	Ecuador
	Report	Guerra 27'; Morán 31'; Cazares 61'; Alcívar 67'

Estadio Emiliano Ghezzi, Asunción

== Final stage ==
If teams finished level on points, the final rankings would be determined according to the same criteria as the first stage, taking into account only matches in the final stage.

All match times were in PYT (UTC−3), as listed by CONMEBOL.

Pos	Team	Pld	W	D	L	GF	GA	GD	Pts	Qualification
1	Brazil (C)	5	4	1	0	11	2	+9	13	2026 FIFA U-20 Women's World Cup
2	Ecuador	5	3	2	0	10	4	+6	11	2026 FIFA U-20 Women's World Cup
3	Argentina	5	2	1	2	9	7	+2	7	2026 FIFA U-20 Women's World Cup
4	Colombia	5	1	1	3	3	6	−3	4	2026 FIFA U-20 Women's World Cup
5	Paraguay (H)	5	1	1	3	5	13	−8	4	
6	Venezuela	5	0	2	3	4	10	−6	2	

Source: CONMEBOL
Rules for classification: Tiebreakers
(C) Champions; (H) Hosts
16 February 2026
18:00

Paraguay	1–3	Brazil
Bareiro 60'	Report	Noguiera 4'; Nayara 17'; Tainá 63'

CARFEM, Ypané
16 February 2026
20:00

Argentina	2–2	Venezuela
Altgelt 50'; Núñez 61'	Report	Muñoz 76'; Reyes 86'

Estadio Luis Alfonso Giagni, Villa Elisa
16 February 2026
22:00

Colombia	0–1	Ecuador
	Report	Flores 66'

CARFEM, Ypané

19 February 2026
18:00

Venezuela	0–2	Paraguay
	Report	Rebanales 45+6' (o.g.); Benítez 75' (pen.)

CARFEM, Ypané
19 February 2026
20:00

Colombia	0–1	Brazil
	Report	Vitorinha 54'

CARFEM, Ypané
19 February 2026
22:00

Argentina	0–1	Ecuador
	Report	Vélez 45'

Estadio Luis Alfonso Giagni, Villa Elisa

22 February 2026
18:00

Venezuela	2–2	Ecuador
Chirinos 45+5' (pen.); Hernández 46'	Report	Morán 33'; Pico 59' (pen.)

CARFEM, Ypané
22 February 2026
20:00

Brazil	4–0	Argentina
Evelin 3'; Clarinha 35'; Brendha 64'; Carioca 90+2'	Report

Estadio Luis Alfonso Giagni, Villa Elisa
22 February 2026
22:00

Paraguay	1–1	Colombia
Villalba 48'	Report	Díaz 90+2'

CARFEM, Ypané

25 February 2026
18:00

Ecuador	1–1	Brazil
Thaynara 68' (o.g.)	Report	Vitorinha 12'

CARFEM, Ypané
25 February 2026
20:00

Venezuela	0–2	Colombia
	Report	Sterling 45+3'; Díaz 52'

CARFEM, Ypané
25 February 2026
22:00

Argentina	4–0	Paraguay
Paz 24'; Núñez 36' (pen.), 66'; Maldonado 66'	Report

Estadio Luis Alfonso Giagni, Villa Elisa

28 February 2026
18:00

Colombia	0–3	Argentina
	Report	Diz 72', 84', 90+2'

Estadio Luis Alfonso Giagni, Villa Elisa
28 February 2026
20:00

Ecuador	5–1	Paraguay
Guerra 2', 43', 45+9'; Pico 40'; Alcívar 83'	Report	Bareiro 10' (pen.)

CARFEM, Ypané
28 February 2026
22:00

Brazil	2–0	Venezuela
Tainá 19'; Clarinha 37'	Report

CARFEM, Ypané

== Qualified teams for FIFA U-20 Women's World Cup ==
The following four teams from CONMEBOL qualified for the 2026 FIFA U-20 Women's World Cup.

Team	Qualified on	Previous appearances in tournament^{1}
Brazil	22 February 2026	11 (2002, 2004, 2006, 2008, 2010, 2012, 2014, 2016, 2018, 2022, 2024)
Ecuador	22 February 2026	0 (debut)
Argentina	28 February 2026	4 (2006, 2008, 2012, 2024)
Colombia	28 February 2026	3 (2010, 2022, 2024)

^{1} Bold indicates champions for that year. Italic indicates hosts for that year.
