= Peru women's national under-20 football team =

Women's youth national football team representing Peru

Peru Women's U-20
- Nickname(s): La Bicolor (The Bicolour); La Blanquirroja (The White And Red); La Rojiblanca (The Red and White)
- Association: Peruvian Football Federation
- Confederation: CONMEBOL (South America)
- Head coach: Gastón Camargo
- Captain: Lucerito Huamán
- Home stadium: Estadio Nacional
- FIFA code: PER
First colours	Second colours

First international
- Chile 0–5 Peru (Sucre, Bolivia; 13 May 2004)

Biggest win
- Chile 0–5 Peru (Sucre, Bolivia; 13 May 2004)

Biggest defeat
- Colombia 9–0 Peru (Riobamba, Ecuador; 17 January 2018)

South American Under-20 Women's Football Championship
- Appearances: 12 (first in 2004)
- Best result: Fourth Place (2006)

The Peru women's national under-20 football team represents Peru in international women's football age of U-20 and is controlled by the Peruvian Football Federation (FPF) (Federación Peruana de Fútbol in Spanish) as a part of the CONMEBOL federation. The team plays in South American Under-20 Women's Football Championship and has yet to qualify for a FIFA U-20 Women's World Cup.

== History ==
The Peru women's national under-20 football team have played their debut match against Chile on 13 May 2004 at Sucre, Bolivia which got victory by 0–5 goals. Its the team first and largest win. The nation have participated all the edition of South American U-20 Women's Championship and they finished Fourth-place in 2006 it's the team best performance in the competitions. They would repeat the same feat at the 2010 South American U-20 Women's Championship, placing fourth. On 17 January 2018, the team received their largest defeat, losing 9-0 to Colombia in Riobamba, Ecuador.

In April 2024, the Peru women's national under-20 football team got their first win in a competitive tournament since 2018, defeating hosts Ecuador 2-0 at the 2024 South American Under-20 Women's Football Championship. Earlier, they drew with Argentina. Peru will then lose to Paraguay 2-1 but defeat Uruguay 2-1 to advance on to the final round for the first time since 2006.

== Team image ==
=== Nicknames ===
The Peru women's national under-20 football team has been known or nicknamed as "La Blanquirroja" or "La Rojiblanca (The White And Red)".

=== Home stadium ===
The team plays most of its home matches on the Estadio Nacional in Lima. The stadium has a capacity of 50,000. The team also plays at other stadiums and the Villa Deportiva Nacional (VIDENA).

== Fixtures and results ==
legend

Win Draw Loss Fixture

== Current squad ==
The following squad was announced on 2 February 2026 for 2026 South American Under-20 Women's Football Championship.

As of 6 November 2026

No.	Pos.	Player	Date of birth (age)	Caps	Goals	Club
	GK	Kaylee Rybinski	4 April 2009 (aged 16)			(Peruvian Football Federation) Alianza Lima
	GK	Laura Miranda Durán	18 August 2007 (aged 18)			(Royal Spanish Football Federation) Futbolellas CFF
	DF	Ana Lucía Deletre	2 July 2009 (aged 16)			(French Football Federation) Stade de Reims
	DF	Carmen Campos Huamán	19 December 2006 (aged 19)			(Peruvian Football Federation) Universitario
	DF	Annabella Kellermann	16 November 2006 (aged 19)			(United States Soccer Federation) LA Surf soccer
	DF	Angela Laynes	1 November 2007 (aged 18)			(Peruvian Football Federation) Alianza Lima
	DF	Luana Chamochumbi	20 February 2006 (aged 19)	3	0	(Peruvian Football Federation) Universitario
	DF	Alejandra Salazar Castro	30 September 2009 (aged 16)			(Peruvian Football Federation) FC Killas
	MF	Sarah Elizabeth Reyes	18 May 2006 (aged 19)			(United States Soccer Federation) New Jersey City
	MF	Lucerito Huamán (captain)	21 December 2006 (aged 19)			(Peruvian Football Federation) Alianza Lima
	MF	Alba Soto	8 December 2008 (aged 17)			(Peruvian Football Federation) FBC Melgar
	MF	Khloe Olano	12 April 2008 (aged 17)			(United States Soccer Federation) Cedar Stars Academy
	MF	Sofía Aguayo	12 January 2007 (aged 19)			(United States Soccer Federation) Mississippi State University
	MF	Sofía Ayala	6 September 2006 (aged 19)			(Argentine Football Association) CA Huracán
	MF	Dominic Escudero	2 October 2008 (aged 17)			(Peruvian Football Federation) Club Yanapuma
	MF	Alexa Zevallos	1 July 2008 (aged 17)			(Peruvian Football Federation) FBC Melgar
	MF	Isabella Kaemmerer	18 June 2007 (aged 18)			(United States Soccer Federation) University of Hawaiʻi at Mānoa
	MF	María Espejo	24 November 2006 (aged 19)			(Peruvian Football Federation) Universitario
	FW	Camila Pío	12 April 2008 (aged 17)			(Peruvian Football Federation) Universitario
	FW	Valeria Luzio	21 March 2006 (aged 19)			(United States Soccer Federation) Rochester
	FW	Lupita Rodríguez	30 April 2009 (aged 16)			(Peruvian Football Federation) Alianza Lima
	FW	Claudia Ipanaque	21 October 2006 (aged 19)			(Peruvian Football Federation) Universitario

== Competitive record ==
=== FIFA U-20 Women's World Cup ===
FIFA U-20 Women's World Cup record
Year	Result	Pld	W	D	L	GF	GA
(Canada) 2002	Did not qualify						
(Thailand) 2004	Did not qualify						
(Russia) 2006	Did not qualify						
(Chile) 2008	Did not qualify						
(Germany) 2010	Did not qualify						
(Japan) 2012	Did not qualify						
(Canada) 2014	Did not qualify						
(Papua New Guinea) 2016	Did not qualify						
(France) 2018	Did not qualify						
(Costa Rica) 2022	Did not qualify						
(Colombia) 2024	Did not qualify						
(Poland) 2026	Did not qualify						
2028	To be determined						
Total	–	–	–	–	–	–	–

=== South American Under-20 Women's Football Championship ===
South American Under-20 Women's Football Championship record
Year	Result	MP	W	D	L	GF	GA
(Brazil) 2004	Group stage	2	1	0	1	5	0
(Chile) 2006	Fourth place	7	2	2	3	6	18
(Brazil) 2008	Group stage	4	1	0	3	5	14
(Colombia) 2010	Group stage	4	0	0	4	1	16
(Brazil) 2012	Group stage	4	0	1	3	1	9
(Uruguay) 2014	Group stage	4	0	0	4	3	13
(Brazil) 2015	Group stage	4	0	0	4	4	12
(Ecuador) 2018	Group stage	4	1	0	3	3	16
(Argentina) 2020	Group stage	4	0	1	3	0	12
(Chile) 2022	Group stage	4	0	0	4	0	13
(Ecuador) 2024	Sixth place	10	2	2	6	9	20
(Paraguay) 2026	Group stage	4	1	0	3	2	14
Total	Fourth place	55	8	6	41	39	157

=== Bolivarian Games ===
Bolivarian Games record
Year	Result	Pld	W	D	L	GF	GA
From 2005 to 2009	See Women's senior team						
(Peru) 2013	Fifth place	3	1	1	1	3	3
(Colombia) 2017	Fifth place	4	0	1	3	1	8
(Colombia) 2022	Did not enter						
From 2024 to 2025	No tournament held						
(Colombia) 2029	To be determined						
Total	Fifth place	7	1	2	4	4	11
