= 2024 South American Under-20 Women's Championship squads =

Association football teams

This article describes about the squads for the 2024 South American Under-20 Women's Football Championship.

== Group A ==
=== Argentina ===
The squad was announced on 7 April 2024.

Head coach: Christian Meloni

No.	Pos.	Player	Date of birth (age)	Club
1	GK	Martina Krotter	2 June 2005 (aged 18)	(Argentina) River Plate
2	DF	Camila Duarte	3 October 2005 (aged 18)	(Argentina) River Plate
3	DF	Milagros Martin	26 April 2007 (aged 16)	(Argentina) Platense
4	DF	Juana Cangaro	13 February 2006 (aged 18)	(Argentina) River Plate
5	MF	Morena Calvo	29 May 2006 (aged 17)	(Argentina) Estudiantes
6	DF	Anela Nigito	22 June 2004 (aged 19)	(United States) CSU Bakersfield
7	FW	Nayla Gallo	4 October 2004 (aged 19)	(Argentina) Independiente
8	MF	Sofía Domínguez	16 December 2005 (aged 18)	(Argentina) River Plate
9	FW	Kishi Núñez	17 May 2006 (aged 17)	(Argentina) Boca Juniors
10	MF	María Altgelt	11 May 2006 (aged 17)	(Argentina) River Plate
11	FW	Verónica Acuña	12 February 2004 (aged 20)	(Argentina) Banfield
12	GK	Paulina Aprile	13 May 2008 (aged 15)	(Argentina) Rosario Central
13	DF	Luciana Pérez	22 January 2005 (aged 19)	(Argentina) Huracán
14	DF	Tatiana Sarmiento	7 August 2005 (aged 18)	(Argentina) UAI Urquiza
15	MF	Valentina Tesio	6 February 2006 (aged 18)	(Argentina) Ferro
16	MF	Julieta Romero	8 June 2004 (aged 19)	(Argentina) River Plate
17	DF	Denise García	15 March 2006 (aged 18)	(Spain) Real Oviedo
18	DF	Belén Ludueña	7 June 2004 (aged 19)	(Argentina) River Plate
19	FW	Annika Paz	16 November 2008 (aged 15)	(Argentina) River Plate
20	MF	Paula de la Serna	2 August 2005 (aged 18)	(Brazil) Red Bull Bragantino
21	MF	Julieta Martínez	3 October 2007 (aged 16)	(Argentina) Boca Juniors
22	MF	Margarita Giménez	1 November 2004 (aged 19)	(Argentina) Ferro

=== Ecuador ===
The squad was announced on 1 April 2024.

Head coach: Eduardo Moscoso

No.	Pos.	Player	Date of birth (age)	Club
1	GK	Jade López	6 November 2004 (aged 19)	
2	MF	María Serrano	29 October 2004 (aged 19)	
3	DF	Sheyla Macías	22 January 2004 (aged 20)	
4	MF	Ana María Cháves	22 January 2004 (aged 20)	
5	MF	Fiorella Pico	10 June 2007 (aged 16)	
6	DF	Carolina Reyes	4 January 2005 (aged 19)	
7	MF	Karen Litardo	18 August 2005 (aged 18)	
8	FW	Rosa Flores	26 June 2006 (aged 17)	
9	MF	Maritxell Cazares	21 August 2006 (aged 17)	
10	MF	Arella Jácome	20 August 2004 (aged 19)	
11	MF	Naomy Briones	5 November 2004 (aged 19)	
12	GK	Melany Pozo	13 May 2007 (aged 16)	
13	MF	Ashley Reyes	28 May 2004 (aged 19)	
14	MF	Ingrid Pianda	6 March 2004 (aged 20)	
15	MF	Evelyn Burgos	19 April 2007 (aged 16)	
16	FW	Yaritza Valencia	25 January 2004 (aged 20)	
17	MF	Dariana Morán	29 March 2007 (aged 17)	
18	MF	Lía Rodríguez	25 June 2005 (aged 18)	
19	MF	Kathleen Mendoza	19 July 2006 (aged 17)	
20	MF	Mary Guerra	7 March 2008 (aged 16)	
21	MF	Doménica Arboleda	25 May 2007 (aged 16)	
22	GK	María Rodríguez	28 October 2008 (aged 15)	

=== Paraguay ===
The squad was announced on 5 April 2024.

Head coach: Fabio Fukumoto

No.	Pos.	Player	Date of birth (age)	Club
1	GK	Luana Rodríguez	26 November 2004 (aged 19)	(Paraguay) Guaraní
2	DF	Luz Cardozo	19 July 2006 (aged 17)	(Paraguay) Olimpia
3	DF	Sofía Almirón	20 January 2004 (aged 20)	(Chile) Everton
4	DF	Naomi De León	6 May 2005 (aged 18)	(Paraguay) Libertad
5	MF	Danna Garcete	21 May 2005 (aged 18)	(Paraguay) Olimpia
6	DF	Gabriela Valdez	25 January 2004 (aged 20)	(Argentina) Banfield
7	MF	Fiorella Fernández	31 August 2006 (aged 17)	(Paraguay) Libertad
8	MF	Adriana Martínez	9 April 2005 (aged 19)	(Brazil) Grêmio
9	FW	Zunilda Coronel	2 August 2004 (aged 19)	(Paraguay) Libertad
10	FW	Fátima Acosta	7 January 2005 (aged 19)	(Brazil) São Paulo
11	FW	Agustina Varela	21 May 2005 (aged 18)	(Paraguay) Olimpia
12	GK	Araceli Leguizamón	6 August 2005 (aged 18)	(Brazil) Grêmio
13	DF	Hannah Núñez	6 October 2004 (aged 19)	(United States) Ranger College
14	DF	Vanessa Arnaboldi	14 February 2005 (aged 19)	(Brazil) Internacional
15	MF	Giulianna Quiñónez	23 July 2006 (aged 17)	(Paraguay) Cerro Porteño
16	DF	Nayeli Torres	2 August 2006 (aged 17)	(Paraguay) Libertad
17	MF	Ilda Zayas	27 May 2004 (aged 19)	(Paraguay) Sportivo Trinidense
18	FW	Yanina González	2 May 2005 (aged 18)	(Paraguay) Olimpia
19	FW	María Tamay	23 April 2004 (aged 19)	(Paraguay) Guaireña
20	FW	Pamela Villalba	2 February 2006 (aged 18)	(Paraguay) Olimpia
21	MF	Jorgelina González	23 April 2004 (aged 19)	(Paraguay) Nacional/Humaitá
22	MF	Daniela González	20 March 2006 (aged 18)	(Paraguay) Olimpia

=== Peru ===
The squad was announced on 10 April 2024.

Head coach: Jaqueline Ucella

No.	Pos.	Player	Date of birth (age)	Club
1	GK	Lucía Arcos	12 February 2004 (aged 20)	(Spain) Terrassa FC
2	DF	Alison Buitron	31 July 2005 (aged 18)	(Peru) Sporting Cristal
3	DF	Emily Arévalo	6 March 2004 (aged 20)	(England) Bristol City
4	DF	Victoria Ochoa	12 August 2005 (aged 18)	(Peru) Sporting Cristal
5	MF	Mia León	22 March 2005 (aged 19)	(Spain) Madrid CFF
6	DF	María Espejo	24 November 2006 (aged 17)	(Peru) Sporting Cristal
7	FW	Birka Ruíz	27 July 2005 (aged 18)	(Peru) Alianza Lima
8	MF	Ester Díaz	18 December 2004 (aged 19)	(Peru) Sporting Cristal
9	FW	Linda Espinoza	3 May 2004 (aged 19)	(Peru) Sporting Victoria
10	MF	Melanny Mondaca	1 September 2005 (aged 18)	(Peru) Sporting Cristal
11	FW	Sashenka Porras	16 June 2005 (aged 18)	(Peru) Alianza Lima
12	GK	Jenyfer Loli	25 January 2006 (aged 18)	(Peru) Alianza Lima
13	FW	Naicha Urbina	26 October 2005 (aged 18)	(Peru) Academia Cantolao
14	FW	Valerie Gherson	28 December 2005 (aged 18)	(Peru) Universitario
15	FW	Elsa Tapullima	21 November 2004 (aged 19)	(Peru) Alianza Lima
16	FW	Marie Briceño	1 November 2004 (aged 19)	(Peru) FC Killas
17	MF	Alexia Catalán	7 March 2005 (aged 19)	(Peru) Academia Cantolao
18	MF	Lucerito Huamán	12 December 2006 (aged 17)	(Peru) Alianza Lima
19	MF	Samantha Villavicencio	15 January 2006 (aged 18)	(United States) Downtown United
20	DF	Alhisson Sotelo	6 September 2004 (aged 19)	(Peru) Sporting Cristal
21	DF	Taylor Vogt	8 March 2005 (aged 19)	(United States) Florida Atlantic
22	GK	Milenka Cruzado	17 April 2005 (aged 18)	(Peru) Sporting Cristal

=== Uruguay ===
The squad was announced on 4 April 2024.

Head coach: Daniel Pérez

No.	Pos.	Player	Date of birth (age)	Club
1	GK	Martina Alonso	7 April 2004 (aged 20)	(Uruguay) Nacional
2	DF	Oriana Omento	23 April 2004 (aged 19)	(Uruguay) Peñarol
3	DF	Valentina Cousillas	5 January 2006 (aged 18)	(Uruguay) Nacional
4	DF	Florencia Bartholomai	28 January 2005 (aged 19)	(United States) Albany Great Danes
5	MF	Ahelin Piña	13 May 2005 (aged 18)	(Argentina) Talleres
6	DF	Isabela Pérez	28 February 2006 (aged 18)	(Uruguay) Nacional
7	FW	Yamila Dornelles	9 July 2006 (aged 17)	(Uruguay) Nacional
8	MF	Agustina Núñez	1 February 2004 (aged 20)	(Uruguay) Peñarol
9	FW	Antonella Mazziotto	27 October 2005 (aged 18)	(United States) Montverde Academy
10	FW	Lucía Flores	23 November 2005 (aged 18)	(Uruguay) Peñarol
11	MF	Valentina Pereira	30 May 2006 (aged 17)	(Uruguay) Nacional
12	GK	Helena Reja	31 January 2004 (aged 20)	(Uruguay) Defensor Sporting
13	MF	Victoria Rocha	7 March 2004 (aged 20)	(Uruguay) Nacional
14	FW	Clara Güell	1 July 2006 (aged 17)	(Uruguay) Peñarol
15	MF	Faustina Del Sur	6 January 2006 (aged 18)	(Uruguay) Nacional
16	MF	Allegra Rodríguez	3 October 2006 (aged 17)	(Uruguay) Peñarol
17	DF	Luana Fernández	3 June 2003 (aged 20)	(Uruguay) Liverpool
18	FW	Anna Cola	9 April 2005 (aged 19)	(Uruguay) Nacional
19	DF	Celeste Santana	2 January 2006 (aged 18)	(Uruguay) Nacional
20	FW	Josefina Félix	10 April 2006 (aged 18)	(Uruguay) Nacional
21	MF	Sofía Romero	6 May 2005 (aged 18)	(Uruguay) Nacional
22	GK	Romina Olmedo	7 October 2006 (aged 17)	(Uruguay) Peñarol

== Group B ==
=== Bolivia ===
The squad was announced on 26 March 2024.

Head coach: Mauricio Villarroel

No.	Pos.	Player	Date of birth (age)	Club
1	GK	Tamara Salazar	17 February 2005 (aged 19)	
2	DF	Mariana Ayala	9 January 2005 (aged 19)	(Bolivia) Exótico Tiquipaya
3	DF	Lucerito Bravo	18 July 2005 (aged 18)	(Bolivia) Blooming
4	DF	Jhenifer Cuba	27 April 2005 (aged 18)	(Bolivia) Astor
5	DF	Viviana Ramírez	31 March 2005 (aged 19)	(Bolivia) Inter Star Rush
6	MF	Anabel Flores	19 November 2005 (aged 18)	(Bolivia) Oriente Petrolero
7	MF	Jhylian Mamani	29 December 2004 (aged 19)	(Bolivia) The Strongest
8	FW	Jimena Quispe	24 February 2005 (aged 19)	
9	FW	Tatiana Soleto	6 November 2005 (aged 18)	(Bolivia) Blooming
10	MF	Mishelle Pereyra	2 March 2004 (aged 20)	(Bolivia) Inter Star Rush
11	FW	Briseyda Orellana	1 June 2004 (aged 19)	(Bolivia) Exótico Tiquipaya
12	GK	Vanessa Ojeda	29 March 2006 (aged 18)	(Bolivia) Real Tomayapo
13	DF	Amelia Salas	16 May 2005 (aged 18)	(Bolivia) 24 de Septiembre
14	DF	Lenny Lafuente	21 February 2004 (aged 20)	(Bolivia) Wilstermann
15	DF	Yadhira Pedraza	31 December 2005 (aged 18)	(Bolivia) Kiriakom
16	FW	Karla Paz	16 February 2006 (aged 18)	(Bolivia) Deportivo ITA
17	FW	Melvi Fernández	27 June 2005 (aged 18)	(Bolivia) La Santa Cruz
18	MF	Sarahi Romero	21 July 2006 (aged 17)	(Bolivia) Deportivo ITA
19	MF	Sabrina Pereira	20 September 2005 (aged 18)	(Bolivia) Real Tomayapo
20	MF	Sara Sanzetenea	26 March 2005 (aged 19)	
21	MF	Claudia Chávez	4 December 2005 (aged 18)	(Bolivia) La Santa Cruz
22	GK	Mel Ontiveros	13 January 2006 (aged 18)	(Bolivia) Wilstermann

=== Brazil ===
The squad was announced on 8 April 2024.

Head coach: Rosana Augusto

No.	Pos.	Player	Date of birth (age)	Club
1	GK	Mari	7 July 2005 (aged 18)	(Brazil) Internacional
2	MF	Gi Fernandes	23 December 2004 (aged 19)	(Brazil) Corinthians
3	DF	Guta	5 May 2005 (aged 18)	(United States) UCF Knights
4	DF	Duda Cordeiro	4 December 2004 (aged 19)	(Brazil) Corinthians
5	MF	Marzia	7 June 2004 (aged 19)	(Brazil) Internacional
6	MF	Guimarães	11 February 2004 (aged 20)	(Brazil) Botafogo
7	FW	Milena	7 April 2004 (aged 20)	(Brazil) São Paulo
8	MF	Lara	1 September 2005 (aged 18)	(United States) IMG Academy
9	FW	Vendito	25 March 2005 (aged 19)	(Brazil) Ferroviária
10	MF	Ana Luiza	22 September 2004 (aged 19)	(Brazil) Ferroviária
11	FW	Ana Flávia	31 August 2005 (aged 18)	(Brazil) São Paulo
12	GK	Rillary	10 July 2005 (aged 18)	(Brazil) Corinthians
13	DF	Grazy	18 August 2005 (aged 18)	(Brazil) Ferroviária
14	DF	Ana Bea	30 April 2005 (aged 18)	(Brazil) São Paulo
15	DF	Rebeca	1 September 2005 (aged 18)	(Brazil) Cruzeiro
16	DF	Letícia	12 May 2004 (aged 19)	(Brazil) Flamengo
17	FW	Pyetra	25 April 2005 (aged 18)	(Brazil) Grêmio
18	MF	Amaral	11 November 2004 (aged 19)	(Brazil) São Paulo
19	FW	Gisele	20 May 2007 (aged 16)	(Brazil) Grêmio
20	MF	Carol Firmino	1 June 2005 (aged 18)	(Brazil) Fluminense
21	FW	Giovana Canali	12 February 2006 (aged 18)	(United States) FC Prime
22	MF	Pâmela	23 November 2004 (aged 19)	(Brazil) Ferroviária

=== Chile ===
The squad was announced on 7 April 2024.

Head coach: Luis Mena

No.	Pos.	Player	Date of birth (age)	Club
1	GK	Ignacia Bustos	13 August 2004 (aged 19)	(Chile) Universidad Católica
2	DF	Anaís Cifuentes	1 January 2005 (aged 19)	(Chile) Colo-Colo
3	DF	Monserrat Hernández	19 July 2005 (aged 18)	(Chile) Santiago Morning
4	MF	Karen Fuentes	3 August 2004 (aged 19)	Universidad de Chile
5	DF	Catalina Figueroa	28 January 2005 (aged 19)	(Chile) Universidad Católica
6	MF	Anaís Álvarez	4 July 2007 (aged 16)	(Chile) Colo-Colo
7	FW	Agustina Heyermann	3 August 2004 (aged 19)	(Chile) Universidad Católica
8	MF	Paloma Bustamante	7 December 2005 (aged 18)	(Chile) Palestino
9	FW	Nicole Carter	13 August 2008 (aged 15)	(Chile) Colo-Colo
10	MF	Millaray Cortés	30 June 2004 (aged 19)	(Chile) Universidad Católica
11	DF	Tali Rovner	29 June 2005 (aged 18)	(Chile) Universidad Católica
12	GK	Bernardita Hernández	5 November 2004 (aged 19)	(Chile) Colo-Colo
13	DF	Alessandra Valle	18 January 2005 (aged 19)	(United States) Bulls FC Academy
14	MF	Isidora Agurto	9 December 2004 (aged 19)	Universidad de Chile
15	DF	Diana Díaz	15 December 2004 (aged 19)	(Chile) Colo-Colo
16	DF	Emma González	27 December 2006 (aged 17)	Universidad de Chile
17	FW	Martina Oses	21 June 2006 (aged 17)	(Chile) Palestino
18	FW	Pascal Espejo	26 December 2005 (aged 18)	Universidad de Chile
19	FW	Pamela Cabezas	10 July 2007 (aged 16)	(Chile) Universidad Católica
20	MF	Ámbar Figueroa	24 October 2007 (aged 16)	(Chile) Santiago Morning
21	MF	Florencia Azúa	6 October 2006 (aged 17)	(Chile) Colo-Colo
22	GK	Jazmín Labrín	16 March 2007 (aged 17)	(Chile) Colo-Colo

=== Colombia ===
The squad was announced on 8 April 2024.

Head coach: Carlos Paniagua

No.	Pos.	Player	Date of birth (age)	Club
1	GK	Luisa Agudelo	27 March 2007 (aged 17)	(Colombia) Deportivo Cali
2	DF	Mary Álvarez	22 August 2005 (aged 18)	(Colombia) Atlético Nacional
3	DF	Cristina Motta	15 September 2005 (aged 18)	(Colombia) Independiente Santa Fe
4	DF	Yunaira López	4 December 2004 (aged 19)	(Colombia) Atlético Nacional
5	DF	Stefanía Perlaza	25 September 2005 (aged 18)	(Colombia) Deportivo Cali
6	MF	Liz Osorio	20 November 2004 (aged 19)	(Colombia) Atlético Nacional
7	MF	Laura Garavito	5 April 2005 (aged 19)	(Colombia) Millonarios
8	MF	Natalia Hernández	19 January 2005 (aged 19)	(Colombia) Deportivo Cali
9	FW	Yésica Muñoz	27 April 2005 (aged 18)	(Colombia) Llaneros
10	FW	Gabriela Rodríguez	10 May 2005 (aged 18)	(Colombia) América de Cali
11	DF	Maithé López	24 January 2007 (aged 17)	(Colombia) Real Santander
12	GK	Valery Restrepo	10 September 2004 (aged 19)	(Colombia) Atlético Nacional
13	FW	Greicy Landázury	1 August 2004 (aged 19)	(Colombia) Independiente Medellín
14	DF	María Viáfara	22 July 2006 (aged 17)	(Colombia) Alianza
15	FW	Karla Torres	11 October 2006 (aged 17)	(Colombia) Independiente Santa Fe
16	MF	Juana Ortegón	6 August 2006 (aged 17)	(Colombia) Deportivo Cali
17	MF	Ana González	18 June 2005 (aged 18)	(Colombia) Millonarios
18	FW	Sintia Cabezas	1 May 2006 (aged 17)	(Colombia) América de Cali
19	FW	Mariana Silva	21 August 2007 (aged 16)	(Colombia) Independiente Santa Fe
20	MF	Karla Viancha	8 November 2005 (aged 18)	(Colombia) Independiente Santa Fe
21	MF	Karen Hernández	18 September 2004 (aged 19)	(Colombia) Independiente Santa Fe
22	GK	Valeria Candanoza	29 April 2004 (aged 19)	(Colombia) Independiente Medellín

=== Venezuela ===
The squad was announced on 10 April 2024.

Head coach: Pamela Conti

No.	Pos.	Player	Date of birth (age)	Club
1	GK	Hilary Azuaje	27 October 2004 (aged 19)	
2	DF	Zoraida Blanco	14 June 2006 (aged 17)	
3	DF	Nazly Sánchez	16 May 2005 (aged 18)	
4	DF	Katherine Lobatón	17 February 2005 (aged 19)	
5	DF	Verónica Da Silva	20 December 2004 (aged 19)	
6	DF	Cristina Rivas	7 September 2005 (aged 18)	
7	FW	Froriangel Apóstol	7 September 2005 (aged 18)	
8	MF	Susanna Calvetti	20 June 2006 (aged 17)	
9	FW	Mariana Barreto	12 March 2004 (aged 20)	
10	MF	Marianyela Jiménez	16 April 2004 (aged 19)	
11	MF	Andrea Cova	1 October 2006 (aged 17)	
12	GK	Tibayre Rodríguez	9 August 2004 (aged 19)	
13	FW	Karelis Alvarado	3 September 2005 (aged 18)	
14	FW	Gabriela González	17 May 2005 (aged 18)	
15	MF	Claudia Pérez	10 July 2008 (aged 15)	
16	FW	Rebecca Vega	15 June 2005 (aged 18)	
17	MF	Fabiana Vásquez	20 July 2005 (aged 18)	
18	MF	Alexa Majano	6 July 2005 (aged 18)	
19	FW	Francelis Graterol	29 March 2006 (aged 18)	
20	FW	Camila Madriz	4 June 2005 (aged 18)	
21	MF	Shakiana Dagher	22 August 2005 (aged 18)	
22	GK	Jaelyn Bracamonte	20 October 2006 (aged 17)	
