= Marialba Zambrano =

Venezuelan footballer (born 1995)

Personal information
- Full name: Marialba José Zambrano Saracual
- Date of birth: 17 June 1995 (age 31)
- Place of birth: La Guaira, Venezuela
- Height: 1.55 m (5 ft 1 in)
- Position: Defensive midfielder

Senior career*
Years	Team	Apps	(Gls)
- Caracas
- Dragonas Oriente
2017–2018	Cortuluá		
2018	Monagas		
2019	Sol de América		

International career^{‡}
2010–2012	Venezuela U17	5+	(2)
2014	Venezuela U20	2+	(2)
2014–	Venezuela	11	(1)
2017	Venezuela (futsal)	1+	(1)
- * Club domestic league appearances and goals ‡ National team caps and goals as of 4 October 2019

Marialba José Zambrano Saracual (born 17 June 1995) is a Venezuelan footballer who plays as a defensive midfielder for the Venezuela women's national team. She is also a futsal player who has appeared in the 2017 Copa América Femenina de Futsal.

== International career ==
Zambrano represented Venezuela at the 2010 FIFA U-17 Women's World Cup, 2012 South American U-17 Women's Championship and the 2014 South American U-20 Women's Championship. At senior level, she played two Copa América Femenina editions (2014 and 2018) and the 2018 Central American and Caribbean Games.

=== International goals ===
Scores and results list Venezuela's goal tally first

No.	Date	Venue	Opponent	Score	Result	Competition
1	4 October 2019	Estadio Evelio Hernández, San Felipe, Venezuela	Paraguay	1–0	1–1	Friendly
