= Danny Pedraza =

Bolivian footballer (born 1994)

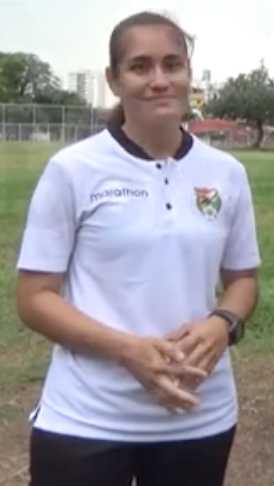
- In a 2021 interview

Personal information
- Full name: Danni Katherin Pedraza Avendaño
- Date of birth: 30 July 1994 (age 32)
- Position: Defender

Senior career*
Years	Team	Apps	(Gls)
- Deportivo Florida

International career^{‡}
2013–2014	Bolivia U20	1+	(1)
2018	Bolivia	1	(0)
- * Club domestic league appearances and goals ‡ National team caps and goals as of 13 April 2018

Danni Katherin Pedraza Avendaño (born 30 July 1994), known as Danny Pedraza, is a Bolivian footballer who plays as a defender for the Bolivia women's national team. She has also played for the Bolivia U20 team.

== Early life ==
Pedraza hails from the Santa Cruz Department.

== International career ==
Pedraza represented Bolivia at the 2014 South American U-20 Women's Championship. At senior level, she played the 2018 Copa América Femenina.
