= Clarinha =

Brazilian footballer (born 2006)

Personal information
- Full name: Ana Clara Campos da Rocha e Oliveira
- Date of birth: 16 January 2006 (age 20)
- Place of birth: Inhumas, Brazil
- Height: 1.62 m (5 ft 4 in)
- Position: Midfielder

Team information
- Current team: Benfica
- Number: 31

Youth career
- 2015–2019: Valadares Gaia
- 2019–2025: Benfica

Senior career*
Years	Team	Apps	(Gls)
2022–2026	Benfica B	50	(12)
2022–	Benfica	6	(0)

International career^{‡}
2025–2026	Brazil U20		
2026–	Brazil	1	(0)
- * Club domestic league appearances and goals as of 22 September 2026 ‡ National team caps and goals as of 10 October 2026

Ana Clara Campos da Rocha e Oliveira (born 16 January 2006), commonly known as Clarinha, is a Brazilian professional footballer who plays as a midfielder for Campeonato Nacional Feminino club Benfica and the Brazil national team.

== Club career ==
Born in Inhumas in the state of Goiás, Clarina moved to Portugal at age four. She began playing football at age six and joined the youth side of local club Valadares Gaia at age nine.

Clarinha left home to join the youth side of Benfica at age 13. On 18 January 2022, she signed a five-and-a-half-year contract with Benfica, becoming perhaps the youngest professional player in Portuguese women's football history at the time at age 16. She made her first-team debut on 20 November 2022, coming off the bench to score the last goal against third-tier Moreirense in the Taça de Portugal.

On 3 May 2025, Clarinha made her first-team league debut in a 5–0 victory over Albergaria. Later that month, she renewed her contract with Benfica. On 17 December 2025, she made her Champions League debut in a 1–1 draw with Paris Saint-Germain.

== International career ==
Clarinha earned Brazil under-17 call-ups but missed their games through injury. On 23 October 2025, she made her international debut for the Brazil under-20 team, scoring in the friendly against Mexico in her home state of Goiás. On 28 February 2026, she scored against Venezuela in the final match of the 2026 South American Under-20 Women's Football Championship, clinching the title after the 2–0 victory. She then represented the under-20s at the 2026 FIFA U-20 Women's World Cup in Poland, where she was named player of the match after the 3–0 win over Canada, scored the equalizing penalty in the eventual 2–1 win over England, and set up the opening goal in the 1–1 draw with the United States in the round of 16, advancing on penalties. Spain eliminated Brazil in the quarterfinals.

After her standout performance at the U-20 World Cup, Arthur Elias called up Clarinha into the senior national team for the first time. She made her senior international debut in a 3–1 friendly win over Argentina on 10 October 2026.

== Honors ==
Benfica B

- Campeonato Nacional II Divisão Feminino: 2023–24

Benfica

- Campeonato Nacional Feminino: 2024–25, 2025–26
- Taça de Portugal Feminina: 2025–26
- Taça da Liga Feminina: 2024–25

Brazil U-20

- South American Under-20 Women's Football Championship: 2026
