= CONMEBOL Sub 20 Femenina =

- Organizer(s): CONMEBOL
- Founded: 2004; 22 years ago
- Region: South America
- Teams: 10
- Qualifier for: FIFA U-20 Women's World Cup
- Related competitions: CONMEBOL Sub 20; CONMEBOL Sub 17 Femenina
- Current champion: Brazil (11th title)
- Most championships: Brazil (11 titles)
- Website: conmebol.com/sub20femenino
- 2026 CONMEBOL Sub 20 Femenina

The CONMEBOL Sub 20 Femenina is a South American football tournament organized by the CONMEBOL for South American national teams of women under age of 20. It serves as a qualification tournament for the FIFA U-20 Women's World Cup. The first edition was for players under the age of 19.

The last edition was held in 2026 in Paraguay. Brazil has won all the competitions with 11 titles in total.

For the 2002 and 2004 FIFA U-19 Women's World Championship, South America was given one qualification spot. In 2002 Brazil and Peru played a two legged play-off for one spot allocated to South America. Brazil won 12–0 on aggregate. Since 2006 South America has been given two spots for the now-renamed FIFA U-20 Women's World Cup, and then four spots since 2024. In this tournament, Brazil has reached the third-place match four times (lost it in 2002 and 2004; won it in 2006 and 2022) and Colombia reached the third-place match in 2010 and lost it. Argentina has been eliminated from the group stage in three of their appearances (2006, 2008 and 2012) and in the round of 16 in 2024; Chile (2008), Venezuela (2016 and 2024) and Paraguay (2014, 2018 and 2024) were eliminated from the group stage in all of their appearances. Ecuador qualified for the first time in 2026.

== Results ==
Ed.	Year	Host	First place match			Third place match			Num. teams
Ed.	Year	Host	(gold) Champions	Score	(silver) Runners-up	(bronze) Third place	Score	Fourth place	Num. teams
1	2004	Brazil	Brazil	– (Note: Played under a round-robin format.)	Paraguay	Ecuador	–	Bolivia	4
2	2006	Chile	Brazil	–	Argentina	Paraguay	–	Peru	10
3	2008	Brazil	Brazil	–	Argentina	Paraguay	–	Chile	10
4	2010	Colombia	Brazil	2–0	Colombia	Paraguay	6–0	Chile	10
5	2012	Brazil	Brazil	–	Argentina	Colombia	–	Paraguay	10
6	2014	Uruguay	Brazil	–	Paraguay	Colombia	–	Bolivia	10
7	2015	Brazil	Brazil	–	Venezuela	Colombia	–	Argentina	10
8	2018	Ecuador	Brazil	–	Paraguay	Colombia	–	Venezuela	10
9	2022	Chile (Note: The 2022 edition originally scheduled by Argentina, but withdrew from hosting on 15 March 2022 due to incomplete by geography region during 2022 Russian invasion of Ukraine.)	Brazil	–	Colombia	Uruguay	–	Venezuela	10
10	2024	Ecuador	Brazil	–	Paraguay	Colombia	–	Argentina	10
11	2026	Paraguay	Brazil	–	Ecuador	Argentina	–	Colombia	10

== Performances by countries ==
Team	Titles	Runners-up	Third-place	Fourth-place
Brazil	11 (2004, 2006, 2008, 2010, 2012, 2014, 2015, 2018, 2022, 2024, 2026)			
Paraguay		4 (2004, 2014, 2018, 2024)	3 (2006, 2008, 2010)	1 (2012)
Argentina		3 (2006, 2008, 2012)	1 (2026)	2 (2015, 2024)
Colombia		2 (2010, 2022)	5 (2012, 2014, 2015, 2018, 2024)	1 (2026)
Ecuador		1 (2026)	1 (2004)	
Venezuela		1 (2015)		2 (2018, 2022)
Uruguay			1 (2022)	
Bolivia				2 (2004, 2014)
Chile				2 (2008, 2010)
Peru				1 (2006)

== Participating nations ==
Legend

- 1st – Champions
- 2nd – Runners-up
- 3rd – Third place
- 4th – Fourth place
- 5th – Fifth place
- 6th – Sixth place
- GS – Group stage
- Fin4 – Final four (the final stage of the 2020 tournament was suspended and later cancelled due to the COVID-19 pandemic).
- — Hosts

Team	(Brazil) 2004	(Chile) 2006	(Brazil) 2008	(Colombia) 2010	(Brazil) 2012	(Uruguay) 2014	(Brazil) 2015	(Ecuador) 2018	(Argentina) 2020	(Chile) 2022	(Ecuador) 2024	(Paraguay) 2026	Total
Argentina	GS	2nd	2nd	GS	2nd	GS	4th	GS	GS	GS	4th	3rd	12
Bolivia	4th	GS	GS	GS	GS	4th	GS	GS	GS	GS	GS	GS	12
Brazil	1st	1st	1st	1st	1st	1st	1st	1st	Fin4	1st	1st	1st	12
Chile	GS	GS	4th	4th	GS	GS	GS	GS	GS	GS	GS	GS	12
Colombia	GS	GS	GS	2nd	3rd	3rd	3rd	3rd	Fin4	2nd	3rd	4th	12
Ecuador	3rd	GS	GS	GS	GS	GS	GS	GS	GS	GS	GS	2nd	12
Paraguay	2nd	3rd	3rd	3rd	4th	2nd	GS	2nd	GS	GS	2nd	5th	12
Peru	GS	4th	GS	GS	GS	GS	GS	GS	GS	GS	6th	GS	12
Uruguay	GS	GS	GS	GS	GS	GS	GS	GS	Fin4	3rd	GS	GS	12
Venezuela	GS	GS	GS	GS	GS	GS	2nd	4th	Fin4	4th	5th	6th	12

== Top scorers ==
The topscorers of the tournaments were:

Year	Player	Goals
2004	(Bolivia) Palmira Loayza	6
2006	(Brazil) Marta	14
2008	(Brazil) Érika (Paraguay) Dulce Quintana	7
2010	(Brazil) Alanna	7
2012	(Brazil) Ketlen	9
2014	(Brazil) Andressa	6
2015	(Argentina) Yamila Rodríguez	6
2018	(Brazil) Geyse	12
2022	(Uruguay) Belén Aquino	10
2024	(Paraguay) Fátima Acosta (Venezuela) Mariana Barreto (Colombia) Gabriela Rodríguez	7
2026	(Argentina) Kishi Núñez	7

== FIFA World Cup qualification and results ==
- 1st = Champions
- 2nd = Runners-up
- 3rd = Third place
- 4th = Fourth place
- QF = World Cup quarter-final
- R16 = Round of 16
- GS = World Cup group stage
- Q = Qualified to World Cup
- = World Cup Hosts

World Cup	(Canada) 2002	(Thailand) 2004	(Russia) 2006	(Chile) 2008	(Germany) 2010	(Japan) 2012	(Canada) 2014	(Papua New Guinea) 2016	(France) 2018	(Costa Rica) 2022	(Colombia) 2024	(Poland) 2026	Total
Argentina			GS	GS		GS					R16	Q	5
Brazil	4th	4th	3rd	QF	GS	GS	GS	QF	GS	3rd	QF	Q	12
Chile				GS									1
Colombia					4th					QF	QF	Q	3
Ecuador												Q	1
Paraguay							GS		GS		GS		3
Venezuela								GS			GS		2

== See also ==
- South American Under-17 Women's Football Championship
