= Ecuador women's national under-20 football team =

Women's national association football team representing Ecuador

Ecuador Women's U-20
- Nickname: La Tricolor (Three colors)
- Association: Federación Ecuador de Fútbol
- Confederation: CONMEBOL (South America)
- Head coach: (Ecuador) Eduardo Moscoso
- Captain: Nayely Bolaños
- Home stadium: Estadio George Capwell
- FIFA code: ECU
First colours	Second colours

First international
- Venezuela 4–0 Ecuador (Caracas, Venezuela; 11 May 2004)

Biggest win
- Ecuador 5–1 Bolivia (La Calera, Chile; 7 April 2022)

Biggest defeat
- Brazil 7–2 Ecuador (Angra dos Reis, Brazil; 25 April 2004)

South American Under-20 Women's Football Championship
- Appearances: 11 (first in 2004)
- Best result: Runners-up (2026)

FIFA U-20 Women's World Cup
- Appearances: 1 (first in 2026)
- Best result: Group stage (2026)
Medal record
South American Under-20 Women's Football Championship
Bronze medal – third place	2004 Brazil
Silver medal – second place	2026 Paraguay

The Ecuador women's national under-20 football team (Spanish: Selección femenina de fútbol de Ecuador) represents Ecuador in international women's football at the age of under-20. The team plays South American Under-20 Women's Football Championship. and its controlled by the Ecuadorian Football Federation.

== Team image ==
=== Nicknames ===
The Ecuador women's national under-20 football team has been known or nicknamed as the La Tricolor (Three colors).

=== Home stadium ===
Uruguay plays their home matches on the Estadio George Capwell and others stadiums.

== History ==
The Ecuador women's national under-20 football team have played their debut game on 11 May 2004 at Caracas, Venezuela against Venezuela which lost by 0–4. The team were finished Third-place in the 2004 South American U-19 Women's Championship. They will participate in the FIFA U-20 Women's World Cup for the first time in 2026 in which the same year they finished runners-up at the CONMEBOL Sub20 Femenina which became the nation's best performance in the tournament.

== Current squad ==
The following squad was named for 2022 South American Under-20 Women's Football Championship

As of 6 April 2022

No.	Pos.	Player	Date of birth (age)	Club
1	GK	Ashley Macías	26 March 2003 (aged 19)	(Ecuadorian Football Federation) Leones del Norte
12	GK	Jomaira Intriago	3 March 2003 (aged 19)	(Ecuadorian Football Federation) El Nacional
22	GK	Jade López	6 November 2004 (aged 17)	(Ecuadorian Football Federation) Independiente del Valle
2	DF	Maria Julia Serrano	29 October 2004 (aged 17)	(Ecuadorian Football Federation) Independiente del Valle
4	DF	Ariana Lomas	17 January 2002 (aged 20)	(Ecuadorian Football Federation) Independiente del Valle
5	DF	Ivette Fernández	12 October 2003 (aged 18)	(Ecuadorian Football Federation) Independiente del Valle
13	DF	Yannell Loza	9 January 2004 (aged 18)	(Ecuadorian Football Federation) Club Ñañas
14	DF	Analiz Zambrano	6 July 2002 (aged 19)	(Ecuadorian Football Federation) Club Ñañas
15	DF	Ingrid Pianda	6 March 2004 (aged 18)	(Ecuadorian Football Federation) D. Ibarra
3	MF	Danna Pacheco	29 March 2002 (aged 20)	(Ecuadorian Football Federation) Independiente del Valle
6	MF	Anahi Naranjo	12 September 2002 (aged 19)	(Ecuadorian Football Federation) Independiente del Valle
7	MF	Camila Paladines	26 September 2002 (aged 19)	(Ecuadorian Football Federation) Independiente del Valle
8	MF	Paulina Rosillo	2 September 2003 (aged 18)	(Ecuadorian Football Federation) Independiente del Valle
11	MF	Emily Arias	16 March 2003 (aged 19)	(Ecuadorian Football Federation) Independiente del Valle
16	MF	Jael Montalvo	20 June 2005 (aged 16)	(Ecuadorian Football Federation) L.D.U. Quito
17	MF	Tatiana Bermeo	20 August 2003 (aged 18)	(Ecuadorian Football Federation) Barcelona S.C.
18	MF	Ashley Reyes	28 May 2004 (aged 17)	
19	MF	Génesis Valdivieso	14 January 2004 (aged 18)	(Ecuadorian Football Federation) Barcelona S.C.
20	MF	Danna Pesántez	29 August 2003 (aged 18)	(Ecuadorian Football Federation) Carneras UPS Fútbol
9	FW	Milagro Barahona	20 June 2002 (aged 19)	(Ecuadorian Football Federation) D. Ibarra
10	FW	Nayely Bolaños (Captain)	25 February 2003 (aged 19)	(Ecuadorian Football Federation) Independiente del Valle
21	FW	Nikole Riquero	18 April 2002 (aged 19)	(Ecuadorian Football Federation) L.D.U. Quito

== Fixtures and results ==
Legend

Win Draw Loss Fixture

== Competitive records ==
Champions Runners-up Third place Fourth place

=== FIFA U-20 Women's World Cup ===
Year	Result	GP	W	D	L	GS	GA	Squad
(Canada) 2002	Did not qualify							
(Thailand) 2004	Did not qualify							
(Russia) 2006	Did not qualify							
(Chile) 2008	Did not qualify							
(Germany) 2010	Did not qualify							
(Japan) 2012	Did not qualify							
(Canada) 2014	Did not qualify							
(Papua New Guinea) 2016	Did not qualify							
(France) 2018	Did not qualify							
(Costa Rica) 2022	Did not qualify							
(Colombia) 2024	Did not qualify							
(Poland) 2026	Group stage	3	1	0	2	7	6	Squad
Total:1/12	Group stage	3	1	0	2	7	6	-

=== South American U-20 Women's Football Championship ===
Year	Result	GP	W	D	L	GS	GA
(Brazil) 2004	Third-place	5	3	0	2	10	11
(Chile) 2006	First stage	4	0	0	4	2	10
(Brazil) 2008	First stage	4	1	1	2	6	10
(Colombia) 2010	Group stage	4	2	0	2	4	4
(Brazil) 2012	First stage	4	1	0	3	6	11
(Uruguay) 2014	First stage	4	2	0	2	6	5
(Brazil) 2015	First stage	4	2	1	1	8	4
(Ecuador) 2018	First stage	4	1	0	3	4	8
(Chile) 2022	First stage	4	2	0	2	9	9
(Ecuador) 2024	First stage	4	1	1	2	3	5
(Paraguay) 2026	Runners-up	9	5	2	2	14	17
Total	11/11	50	20	5	25	72	94

== Head-to-head record ==
The following table shows Ecuador's head-to-head record in the FIFA U-20 Women's World Cup.

Opponent	Pld	W	D	L	GF	GA	GD	Win %
France	1	0	0	1	2	3	−1	0.00
Ghana	1	1	0	0	3	0	+3	100.00
South Korea	1	0	0	1	2	3	−1	0.00
Total	3	1	0	2	7	6	+1	33.33
