= Uruguay women's national under-20 football team =

Women's national association football team representing Uruguay

Uruguay Women's U-20
- Nickname(s): Las Celestes, Charrúas
- Association: Asociación Uruguaya de Fútbol
- Confederation: CONMEBOL (South America)
- Head coach: (Uruguay) Ariel Longo
- Captain: Sharon López
- Home stadium: Estadio Centenario
- FIFA code: URU
| First colours | Second colours |

First international
- Uruguay 1–5 Paraguay (Encarnación, Paraguay; 11 May 2004)

Biggest win
- Uruguay 13–0 Bolivia (La Calera, Chile; 11 April 2022)

Biggest defeat
- Uruguay 0–8 Brazil (Viña del Mar, Chile; 6 January 2006)

South American U-20 Women's Championship
- Appearances: 10 (first in 2004)
- Best result: Third-Place (2022)

FIFA U-20 World Cup
- Appearances: DNQ
Medal record
South American Under-20 Women's Football Championship
| Bronze medal – third place | 2022 Chile |

The Uruguay women's national under-20 football team representing Uruguay in international women's football at the age of under-20. The team competes South American U-20 Women's Championship. Uruguay has never qualified for a FIFA U-20 Women's World Cup.

== Team image ==
=== Nicknames ===
The Uruguay women's national under-20 football team has been known or nicknamed as the Las Celestes, Charrúas.

=== Home stadium ===
Uruguay plays their home matches on the Estadio Centenario and others stadiums.

== History ==
The Uruguay women's national under-20 football team have played its debut game against Paraguay on 11 May 2004 at Encarnación, Paraguay which won by 5–1 goals. The teams has finished Third-Place in the 2022 South American Under-20 Women's Football Championship. They nations has not yet qualified into the FIFA U-20 Women's World Cup.

== Current squad ==
The following players were list for 2022 South American Under-20 Women's Football Championship on 18 March 2022.

As of 18 March 2022

| No. | Pos. | Player | Date of birth (age) | Club |
|---|---|---|---|---|
| 1 | GK | Vanina Sburlati | 3 August 2003 (aged 18) | (Uruguayan Football Association) Peñarol |
| 12 | GK | Helena Reja | 31 January 2004 (aged 18) | (Uruguayan Football Association) Defensor Sporting |
| 2 | DF | Adriana Salvagno | 17 April 2002 (aged 19) | (Uruguayan Football Association) Peñarol |
| 3 | DF | Oriana Fontan | 26 January 2002 (aged 20) | (Uruguayan Football Association) Defensor Sporting |
| 4 | DF | Florencia Méndez | 10 May 2002 (aged 19) | (Uruguayan Football Association) River Plate de San José |
| 6 | DF | Sharon López (Captain) | 1 May 2003 (aged 18) | (Uruguayan Football Association) Nacional |
| 13 | DF | Lucía Cufré | 7 January 2002 (aged 20) | (Uruguayan Football Association) Defensor Sporting |
| 15 | DF | Magalí Arias | 7 August 2003 (aged 18) | (Uruguayan Football Association) Defensor Sporting |
| 16 | DF | Alison Latúa | 23 May 2003 (aged 18) | (Uruguayan Football Association) Nacional |
| 20 | DF | Josefina Félix | 10 June 2004 (aged 17) | (Uruguayan Football Association) Defensor Sporting |
| 22 | DF | Valentina Pereira | 30 May 2006 (aged 15) | (Uruguayan Football Association) Nacional |
| 7 | MF | Juliana Viera | 8 May 2002 (aged 19) | (Uruguayan Football Association) Nacional |
| 8 | MF | Ángela Gómez | 19 August 2002 (aged 19) | (Uruguayan Football Association) Nacional |
| 14 | MF | Nikol Laurnaga | 1 March 2002 (aged 20) | (Uruguayan Football Association) Atenas |
| 17 | MF | Pilar González | 29 June 2002 (aged 19) | (Uruguayan Football Association) Peñarol |
| 18 | MF | Hevelin Jara | 30 July 2002 (aged 19) | (Uruguayan Football Association) Nacional |
| 21 | MF | Manuela Maciel | 19 March 2002 (aged 20) | (Uruguayan Football Association) River Plate de San José |
| 5 | FW | Martina Terra | 9 March 2002 (aged 20) | (Uruguayan Football Association) Nacional |
| 9 | FW | Wendy Carballo | 28 July 2002 (aged 19) | |
| 10 | FW | Solange Lemos | 27 August 2002 (aged 19) | (Uruguayan Football Association) Nacional |
| 11 | FW | Belén Aquino | 1 February 2002 (aged 20) | (Uruguayan Football Association) Peñarol |
| 19 | FW | Catalina Emanuele | 10 December 2002 (aged 19) | (Uruguayan Football Association) San José FC |

== Fixtures and results ==
Legend

Win Draw Loss Fixture

== Competitive records ==
Champions Runners-up Third place Fourth place

=== FIFA U-20 Women's World Cup ===
FIFA U-20 Women's World Cup record
| Year | Round | Position | MP | W | D* | L | GF | GA |
|---|---|---|---|---|---|---|---|---|
| (Canada) 2002 to (Poland) 2026 | Did not qualify | | | | | | | |
| 2028 | To be determined | | | | | | | |
| Total | – | 0/12 | 0 | 0 | 0 | 0 | 0 | 0 |

=== South American Under-20 Women's Football Championship ===
South American Under-20 Women's Football Championship record
| Year | Result | MP | W | D | L | GF | GA |
|---|---|---|---|---|---|---|---|
| (Brazil) 2004 | First stage | 2 | 1 | 0 | 1 | 2 | 5 |
| (Chile) 2006 | First stage | 4 | 0 | 1 | 3 | 3 | 14 |
| (Brazil) 2008 | First stage | 4 | 0 | 1 | 3 | 5 | 14 |
| (Colombia) 2010 | Group stage | 4 | 1 | 0 | 3 | 4 | 15 |
| (Brazil) 2012 | First stage | 4 | 2 | 0 | 2 | 5 | 12 |
| (Uruguay) 2014 | Fourth-Place | 4 | 0 | 1 | 3 | 5 | 16 |
| (Brazil) 2015 | First stage | 4 | 1 | 1 | 2 | 5 | 10 |
| (Ecuador) 2018 | First stage | 4 | 1 | 0 | 3 | 3 | 9 |
| (Argentina) 2020 | First stage | 4 | 3 | 0 | 1 | 13 | 10 |
| (Chile) 2022 | Third Place | 7 | 4 | 0 | 3 | 21 | 8 |
| (Ecuador) 2024 | Group stage | 4 | 0 | 0 | 4 | 3 | 7 |
| (Paraguay) 2026 | Group stage | 4 | 1 | 1 | 2 | 1 | 4 |
| Total | 12/12 | 49 | 14 | 5 | 26 | 36 | 124 |
