= 2014 South American U-20 Women's Championship =

Tournament details
- Host country: Uruguay
- Dates: 13–31 January
- Teams: 10 (from 1 confederation)
- Venue: 2 (in 2 host cities)

Final positions
- Champions: Brazil (6th title)
- Runners-up: Paraguay
- Third place: Colombia
- Fourth place: Bolivia

Tournament statistics
- Matches played: 26
- Goals scored: 82 (3.15 per match)
- Top scorer: (Brazil) Andressa (6 goals)

The 2014 South American U-20 Women's Championship was the 6th edition of the South American under-20 women's football championship. It was held from 13 to 31 January 2014 in Uruguay. The best two teams also qualified for the 2014 FIFA U-20 Women's World Cup.

Brazil were the defending champions having won all five previous editions of the tournament.

After two of three matchdays in the final round Brazil and Paraguay already qualified to the World Cup, Brazil for the sixth time and Paraguay for the first time.

== Participating teams ==
All ten nations of CONMEBOL participated.

- Argentina
- Bolivia
- Brazil (holders)
- Chile
- Colombia
- Ecuador
- Paraguay
- Peru
- Uruguay (hosts)
- Venezuela

== First stage ==
The draw was held on 16 November 2013.

If teams finish level on points, order will be determined according to the following criteria:

1. superior goal difference in all matches
2. greater number of goals scored in all group matches
3. better result in matches between tied teams
4. drawing of lots

All match times are in local Uruguay Summer Time (UTC−02:00).

Key to colours in group tables
Top 2 teams in each group advanced to the second stage

=== Group A ===
Team	Pld	W	D	L	GF	GA	GD	Pts
Brazil	4	3	1	0	13	3	+10	10
Colombia	4	2	2	0	5	2	+3	8
Venezuela	4	2	0	2	9	7	+2	6
Chile	4	0	2	2	2	6	−4	2
Uruguay	4	0	1	3	5	16	−11	1

13 January 2014
17:00

Brazil	2–0	Chile
Patricia 61'; Byanca 88'	Report (in Portuguese)

Estadio Charrúa, Montevideo
Referee: Juana Delgado (Ecuador)
13 January 2014
19:00

Colombia	3–2	Uruguay
González 10'; Santos 31' (pen.), 90+1'	Report (in Spanish)	Gimena Lorenzo 47'; Ana Laura Millán 89'

Estadio Charrúa, Montevideo
Referee: Melany Bermejo (Peru)

15 January 2014
16:30

Colombia	2–0	Venezuela
Restrepo 41'; Shelly Cuan 82'	Report (in Spanish)

Estadio Charrúa, Montevideo
Referee: Olga Miranda (Paraguay)
15 January 2014
18:30

Uruguay	1–8	Brazil
Lacoste 17'	Report (in Spanish)	Andressa 15' (pen.); Patrícia 30', 65', 79'; Djenifer Becker 35'; Ludmila 81'; Cassia 85'; Natália 90'

Estadio Charrúa, Montevideo
Referee: Salomé Di Iorio (Argentina)

17 January 2014
16:30

Colombia	0–0	Chile
	Report (in Spanish)

Estadio Charrúa, Montevideo
Referee: Sirley Cornejo (Bolivia)
17 January 2014
18:30

Uruguay	1–4	Venezuela
Gimena Lorenzo 6'	Report (in Spanish)	María Peraza 45'; Pérez 51'; Villamizar 59'; Zambrano 81'

Estadio Charrúa, Montevideo
Referee: Juana Delgado (Ecuador)

19 January 2014
16:30

Brazil	0–0	Colombia
	Report (in Spanish)

Estadio Charrúa, Montevideo
Referee: Olga Miranda (Paraguay)
19 January 2014
18:30

Chile	1–3	Venezuela
Roa 73' (pen.)	Report (in Spanish)	Zambrano 7'; Romero 9'; Villamizar 90+2'

Estadio Charrúa, Montevideo
Referee: Melany Bermejo (Perú)

21 January 2014
16:30

Brazil	3–2	Venezuela
Gabriela 5'; Andressa 22'; Djenifer Becker 26'	Report (in Spanish)	Nágela 32' (o.g.); M. Rodríguez 90+2'

Estadio Charrúa, Montevideo
Referee: Sirley Cornejo (Bolivia)
21 January 2014
18:30

Uruguay	1–1	Chile
Alaídes Bonilla 90+2'	Report (in Spanish)	Araya 46'

Estadio Charrúa, Montevideo
Referee: Salomé Di Iorio (Argentina)

=== Group B ===
Team	Pld	W	D	L	GF	GA	GD	Pts
Paraguay	4	3	1	0	9	1	+8	10
Bolivia	4	3	0	1	4	5	−1	9
Ecuador	4	2	0	2	6	5	+1	6
Argentina	4	1	1	2	5	3	+2	4
Peru	4	0	0	4	3	13	−10	0

14 January 2014
20:00

Ecuador	1–0	Argentina
Torres 17'	Report (in Spanish)

Estadio del Parque Liebig's, Fray Bentos
Referee: Yanina Mujica (Venezuela)
14 January 2014
22:00

Paraguay	2–0	Peru
Yennifer Álvarez 22'; Godoy 78'	Report (in Spanish)

Estadio del Parque Liebig's, Fray Bentos
Referee: Ana Marques (Brazil)

16 January 2014
20:00

Ecuador	0–1	Bolivia
	Report (in Spanish)	Rojas 23'

Estadio del Parque Liebig's, Fray Bentos
Referee: Gabriela Bandeira
16 January 2014
22:00

Argentina	0–0	Paraguay
	Report (in Spanish)

Estadio del Parque Liebig's, Fray Bentos
Referee: María Belen Carvajal (Chile)

18 January 2014
20:00

Ecuador	4–1	Peru
Barré 54'; Kelly Vera 58', 77'; Torres 66'	Report (in Spanish)	Flores 87' (pen.)

Estadio del Parque Liebig's, Fray Bentos
Referee: Yanina Mujica (Venezuela)
18 January 2014
22:00

Argentina	0–1	Bolivia
	Report (in Spanish)	Rojas 73'

Estadio del Parque Liebig's, Fray Bentos
Referee: Yeimi Martínez (Columbia)

20 January 2014
20:00

Paraguay	3–1	Ecuador
Pico 5'; J. Martínez 9', 36'	Report (in Spanish)	Torres 88'

Estadio del Parque Liebig's, Fray Bentos
Referee: Gabriela Bandeira (Uruguay)
20 January 2014
22:00

Peru	1–2	Bolivia
Ramos 82'	Report (in Spanish)	Pedraza 28'; Ortiz 45'

Estadio del Parque Liebig's, Fray Bentos
Referee: Yeimi Martínez (Columbia)

22 January 2014
20:00

Argentina	5–1	Peru
Cabrera 7', 44', 78'; Cinthia Cecilia López 48'; Muñoz 80'		Martínez 79'

Estadio del Parque Liebig's, Fray Bentos
Referee: María Carvajal (Chile)
22 January 2014
22:00

Paraguay	4–0	Bolivia
J. Martínez 1'; Silvana Romero 56'; Tania Espínola 61'; Fabiola Delvalle 90+1'

Estadio del Parque Liebig's, Fray Bentos
Referee: Ana Marques (Brasil)

== Second stage ==
The four teams will play a single round-robin. Each teams thus plays three matches in this final stage. The winner and the runner-up teams qualify for the 2014 FIFA U-20 Women's World Cup in Canada.

Team	Pld	W	D	L	GF	GA	GD	Pts
Brazil	3	3	0	0	11	0	+11	9
Paraguay	3	2	0	1	6	2	+4	6
Colombia	3	1	0	2	4	7	−3	3
Bolivia	3	0	0	3	0	12	−12	0

25 January 2014
20:00

Paraguay	1–0	Colombia
Alonso 20'	Report (in Spanish)

Estadio del Parque Liebig's, Fray Bentos
Referee: Salomé Di Iorio (Argentina)
25 January 2014
22:00

Brazil	3–0	Bolivia
Andressa 29'; Ludmila 81'; Byanca 87'	Report (in Spanish)

Estadio del Parque Liebig's, Fray Bentos
Referee: María Belen Carvajal (Chile)

28 January 2014
20:00

Colombia	0–6	Brazil
	Report (in Spanish)	Gabriela 11'; Patricia 16'; Andressa 61', 83' (pen.); Djenifer Becker 77'; Byanca 87'

Estadio del Parque Liebig's, Fray Bentos
Referee: Yanina Mujica (Venezuela)
28 January 2014
22:00

Bolivia	0–5	Paraguay
	Report (in English)	J. Martínez 11'; Pico 32', 53'; Yennifer Álvarez 35', 44'

Estadio del Parque Liebig's, Fray Bentos
Referee: Juana Delgado (Ecuador)

31 January 2014
20:00

Colombia	4–0	Bolivia
Restrepo 24', 70'; Jessica Peña 50'; Arbeláez 53'	Report (in Spanish)

Estadio del Parque Liebig's, Fray Bentos
31 January 2014
22:00

Brazil	2–0	Paraguay
Andressa 35'; Ludmila 48'	Report (in Spanish)

Estadio del Parque Liebig's, Fray Bentos

2014 Women's Under-20 South American champions

Brazil
Sixth title
