= Francisca Altgelt =

Argentine footballer (born 2006)

Personal information
- Date of birth: May 11, 2006 (age 20)
- Place of birth: Buenos Aires, Argentina
- Height: 1.71 m (5 ft 7 in)
- Position: Forward

Team information
- Current team: River Plate
- Number: 20

Senior career*
Years	Team	Apps	(Gls)
2023–	River Plate	2	(0)

International career
2024	Argentina U-20	2	(0)
2024–	Argentina	10	(1)
Medal record
Women's football
Representing Argentina
Copa América Femenina
Bronze medal – third place	2025 Ecuador
- * Club domestic league appearances and goals

María Francisca Altgelt (born 11 May 2006) is an Argentine footballer who plays as a forward for River Plate. She is also known by the nickname "Pancha".

== Club career ==
=== River Plate ===
She signed her contract in River Plate in 2023 until December 2025, debuting in 2023 at 16 years old.

== International career ==
=== Argentina ===
She was called up in 2023 after not to go through Argentina women's under-17 football team in Argentina women's under-20 football team, played against Peru in 2024 South American Under-20 Women's Football Championship

Altgelt played in the 2025 Copa América Femenina where she finished third.

== International goals ==
No.	Date	Venue	Opponent	Score	Result	Competition
1.	2 December 2025	Estadio Florencio Sola, Banfield, Argentina	Bolivia	6–0	8–0	2025–26 CONMEBOL Women's Nations League
