= 2008 South American U-20 Women's Championship =

Tournament details
- Host country: Brazil
- City: Porto Alegre; Bagé
- Dates: 7–23 March
- Teams: 10
- Venue: 2 (in 2 host cities)

Final positions
- Champions: Brazil (3rd title)
- Runners-up: Argentina
- Third place: Paraguay
- Fourth place: Chile

Tournament statistics
- Matches played: 26
- Goals scored: 107 (4.12 per match)
- Top scorer(s): (Brazil) Érika (Paraguay) Dulce Quintana (7 goals)

The 2008 South American Under-20 Women's Football Championship was the third edition of South American under-20 women's football championship. It was held from 7 to 23 March 2008 in Porto Alegre and Bagé, Brazil. Team Brazil won this championship for the third time in a row.

== First round ==
=== Group A ===
Team	Pld	W	D	L	GF	GA	GD	Pts
Brazil	4	4	0	0	22	0	+22	12
Paraguay	4	1	2	1	9	10	–1	5
Ecuador	4	1	1	2	6	10	–4	4
Bolivia	4	1	1	2	7	15	–8	4
Peru	4	1	0	3	5	14	–9	3

7 March 2008

Bolivia	1 – 4	Peru

Porto Alegre
7 March 2008

Ecuador	2 – 2	Paraguay

Porto Alegre
9 March 2008

Peru	1 – 2	Ecuador

Porto Alegre
9 March 2008

Brazil	6 – 0	Bolivia

Porto Alegre
11 March 2008

Paraguay	4 – 0	Peru

Porto Alegre
11 March 2008

Ecuador	0 – 4	Brazil

Porto Alegre
13 March 2008

Bolivia	3 – 2	Ecuador

Porto Alegre
13 March 2008

Brazil	5 – 0	Paraguay

Porto Alegre
15 March 2008

Paraguay	3 – 3	Bolivia

Porto Alegre
15 March 2008

Peru	0 – 7	Brazil

Porto Alegre

=== Group B ===
Team	Pld	W	D	L	GF	GA	GD	Pts
Argentina	4	3	0	1	7	4	+3	9
Chile	4	2	1	1	9	4	+5	7
Colombia	4	2	1	1	7	5	+2	7
Venezuela	4	0	3	1	5	6	–1	3
Uruguay	4	0	1	3	5	14	–9	1

8 March 2008

Colombia	3 – 1	Uruguay

Bagé
8 March 2008

Venezuela	1 – 1	Chile

Bagé
10 March 2008

Chile	0 – 1	Colombia

Bagé
10 March 2008

Argentina	1 – 0	Venezuela

Bagé
12 March 2008

Uruguay	1 – 6	Chile

Bagé
12 March 2008

Colombia	1 – 2	Argentina

Bagé
14 March 2008

Venezuela	2 – 2	Colombia

Bagé
14 March 2008

Argentina	3 – 1	Uruguay

Bagé
16 March 2008

Uruguay	2 – 2	Venezuela

Bagé
16 March 2008

Chile	2 – 1	Argentina

Bagé

== Final round ==
Team	Pld	W	D	L	GF	GA	GD	Pts
Brazil	3	3	0	0	8	0	+8	9
Argentina	3	2	0	1	7	7	0	6
Paraguay	3	1	0	2	6	8	–2	3
Chile	3	0	0	3	4	10	–6	0

19 March 2008

Brazil	3 – 0	Chile

19 March 2008

Argentina	4 – 2	Paraguay

21 March 2008

Brazil	2 – 0	Paraguay

21 March 2008

Argentina	3 – 2	Chile

23 March 2008

Brazil	3 – 0	Argentina

23 March 2008

Paraguay	4 – 2	Chile

2008 South American Under-20 Women's Football champions

Brazil
Third title
