= Isidora Agurto =

Chilean footballer

Personal information
- Full name: Isidora Antonia Agurto González
- Date of birth: 8 December 2004 (age 21)
- Place of birth: Chile
- Height: 1.58 m (5 ft 2 in)
- Position: Midfielder

Team information
- Current team: Palestino (on loan from Universidad de Chile)
- Number: 6

Youth career
- Universidad de Chile

Senior career*
Years	Team	Apps	(Gls)
2017–	Universidad de Chile		
2025–	→ Palestino (loan)	45	(2)

International career^{‡}
2024	Chile U20	4	(0)
2026–	Chile	1	(0)
- * Club domestic league appearances and goals as of 14 October 2026 ‡ National team caps and goals as of 14 October 2026

Isidora Antonia Agurto González (born 8 December 2004) is a Chilean footballer who plays as a midfielder for Palestino on loan from Universidad de Chile and the Chile national team.

== Club career ==
As a youth player, Agurto represented the Independencia team in the 2018 Copa ENEL, a Chilean traditional championship. They won the championship, went to Italy and won the 2018 Integration Cup by defeating Inter Milan.

A product of Universidad de Chile, Agurto made her senior debut in 2017, aged 13. In 2025, she was loaned out to Palestino and signed her first professional contract. She renewed her loan for the 2026 season.

== International career ==
Agurto represented Chile U20 in the 2024 South American Championship.

At senior level, Agurto received her first call-up for the friendly matches against Bolivia in October 2026, making her debut in the 7–0 win on 11 October.

== Honours ==
Independencia (city team)

- Copa ENEL: 2018
- Integration Cup: 2018

Universidad de Chile

- Primera División: 2021
