= Bolivia women's national under-20 football team =

Women's national under-20 association football team representing Bolivia

Bolivia Women's U-20
- Nickname: La Verde (The Green one)
- Association: Federación Boliviana de Fútbol
- Confederation: CONMEBOL (South America)
- Head coach: (Bolivia) Mauricio Villarroel
- Captain: Majhely Romero
- Home stadium: Estadio Hernando Siles
- FIFA code: BOL
| First colours | Second colours |

First international
- Bolivia 9–1 Chile (Sucre, Chile; 11 May 2004)

Biggest win
- Bolivia 9–1 Chile (Sucre, Chile; 11 May 2004)

Biggest defeat
- Bolivia 0–13 Uruguay (La Calera, Chile; 11 April 2022)

South American U-20 Women's Championship
- Appearances: 11 (first in 2004)
- Best result: Fourth place (2004, 2014)

FIFA U-20 Women's World Cup
- Appearances: 0

The Bolivia women's national under-20 football team represents Bolivia in international women's football aged 20 and is controlled by the Federación Boliviana de Fútbol. The team competes South American U-20 Women's Championship. Bolivia has never qualified for a FIFA U-20 Women's World Cup.

== Team image ==
=== Nicknames ===
The Bolivia women's national under-20 football team has been known or nicknamed as the "La Verde (The Green one)".

=== Home stadium ===
Bolivia plays their home matches on the Estadio Hernando Siles and others stadiums.

== History ==
The Bolivia women's national under-20 team have meet against Uruguay in their debut game on 11 May 2004 at Sucre, Chile which Chile won by 9–1 goals. The team have participated all the edition of South American Under-20 Women's Football Championship. The girls was finished tournament two times in Fourth-Place 2004, 2014.

== Current squad ==
The following players list were announced for 2022 South American Under-20 Women's Football Championship

As of 11 November 2022

| No. | Pos. | Player | Date of birth (age) | Club |
|---|---|---|---|---|
| 1 | GK | Alba Tamara Salazar | 17 February 2005 (aged 17) | (Bolivian Football Federation) AD Somsardina |
| 12 | GK | Camila Danna Irusta | 5 February 2003 (aged 19) | (Bolivian Football Federation) The Strongest |
| 22 | GK | Erika Paola Sanchez | 2 August 2003 (aged 18) | (Bolivian Football Federation) Inter Stars Rush |
| 2 | DF | Judith Fabiola Herrera | 24 June 2002 (aged 19) | (Bolivian Football Federation) Basco FC |
| 3 | DF | Yuditza Jimena Salvatierra | 26 April 2003 (aged 18) | (Bolivian Football Federation) Mundo Futuro |
| 4 | DF | Valentina Velasquez | 30 May 2003 (aged 18) | (Bolivian Football Federation) Wilstermann |
| 5 | DF | Sarah Nicol Cruz | 24 May 2002 (aged 19) | (Bolivian Football Federation) Bolívar |
| 13 | DF | Jhoseline Lizbeth Quispe | 17 May 2002 (aged 19) | (Bolivian Football Federation) The Strongest |
| 14 | DF | Ingrid Lizeth Guzman | 27 June 2003 (aged 18) | (Bolivian Football Federation) The Strongest |
| 19 | DF | Virginia Nieves | 31 December 2002 (aged 19) | (Bolivian Football Federation) Club Real Tarija |
| 20 | DF | Mariana Ortega | 17 April 2003 (aged 18) | (Bolivian Football Federation) Real Tomayapo |
| 6 | MF | Liliam Lizeth Contreras | 10 July 2004 (aged 17) | (Bolivian Football Federation) The Strongest |
| 8 | MF | Darling Davinia Melgar | 6 January 2004 (aged 18) | (Bolivian Football Federation) Florida |
| 9 | MF | Luana San Miguel | 5 November 2002 (aged 19) | (Bolivian Football Federation) Wilstermann |
| 11 | MF | Jhylian Mary Mamani | 29 December 2004 (aged 17) | (Bolivian Football Federation) The Strongest |
| 15 | MF | Samantha Nicole Alurralde | 4 January 2004 (aged 18) | (Bolivian Football Federation) The Strongest |
| 16 | MF | Brizna Yoelin Sanchez | 5 January 2003 (aged 19) | (Bolivian Football Federation) The Strongest |
| 17 | MF | Nicol Zamara Paredes | 27 July 2004 (aged 17) | (Bolivian Football Federation) The Strongest |
| 21 | MF | Andrea Brigitte Peña | 27 June 2002 (aged 19) | (Bolivian Football Federation) Oriente Petrolero |
| 7 | FW | Tatiana Soleto | 6 November 2005 (aged 16) | (Bolivian Football Federation) Calleja |
| 10 | FW | Majhely Romero (Captain) | 20 January 2003 (aged 19) | (Bolivian Football Federation) The Strongest |
| 18 | FW | Mishelle Pereyra | 2 March 2004 (aged 18) | (Bolivian Football Federation) Santa Cruz FC |

== Fixtures and results ==
Legend

Win Draw Loss Fixture

=== 2022 ===
| 7 April 2022 2022 South American Under-20 Women's Football Championship | Bolivia | 1–5 | Ecuador | La Calera, Chile |
| 18:30 | San Miguel 11' | Report | Arias 5'; Bolaños 15' (pen.), 49', 53' (pen.), 62' | Stadium: Estadio Municipal Nicolás Chahuán Nazar; Referee: Maria Sole Ferrieri (Italy) |

| 9 April 2022 2022 South American Under-20 Women's Football Championship | Bolivia | 0–10 | Brazil | La Calera, Chile |
| 19:30 | | Report | Cris 3'; Tarciane 6', 51'; Luany 17'; Fernandes 18'; Yaya 27'; Maldaner 31'; Mileninha 53'; Bia Gomes 54'; Bruninha 81' | Stadium: Estadio Municipal Nicolás Chahuán Nazar |

| 11 April 2022 2022 South American Under-20 Women's Football Championship | Uruguay | 13–0 | Bolivia | Estadio Municipal Nicolás Chahuán Nazar, La Calera |
| 18:30 | Carballo 16', 64', 65'; Aquino 18', 21', 24', 35' (pen.), 38', 59'; Viera 43', 90'; Félix 57'; Emanuele 69' | Report | | Referee: Yercinia Correa (Venezuela) |

| 13 April 2022 2022 South American Under-20 Women's Football Championship | Paraguay | 3–2 | Bolivia | Estadio Municipal Nicolás Chahuán Nazar, La Calera |
| 16:00 | Riveros 5'; Rolón 24'; Coronel 83' | Report | Salvatierra 41', 57' | Referee: Madelaine Rojas (Chile) |

== Competitive records ==
Champions Runners-up Third place Fourth place

=== FIFA U-20 Women's World Cup ===
FIFA U-20 Women's World Cup record
| Year | Round | Position | MP | W | D* | L | GF | GA |
|---|---|---|---|---|---|---|---|---|
| (Canada) 2002 to (Poland) 2026 | Did not qualify | | | | | | | |
| 2028 | To be determined | | | | | | | |
| Total | – | 0/13 | 0 | 0 | 0 | 0 | 0 | 0 |

=== South American Under-20 Women's Football Championship ===
South American Under-20 Women's Football Championship record
| Year | Result | MP | W | D | L | GF | GA |
|---|---|---|---|---|---|---|---|
| (Brazil) 2004 | Fourth place | 5 | 2 | 3 | 0 | 15 | 8 |
| (Chile) 2006 | First stage | 4 | 1 | 1 | 2 | 5 | 11 |
| (Brazil) 2008 | First stage | 4 | 1 | 1 | 2 | 7 | 15 |
| (Colombia) 2010 | Group stage | 4 | 0 | 0 | 4 | 0 | 8 |
| (Brazil) 2012 | First stage | 4 | 0 | 2 | 2 | 2 | 4 |
| (Uruguay) 2014 | Fourth place | 7 | 3 | 0 | 4 | 4 | 17 |
| (Brazil) 2015 | First stage | 4 | 0 | 1 | 3 | 2 | 8 |
| (Ecuador) 2018 | First stage | 4 | 0 | 1 | 3 | 2 | 14 |
| (Argentina) 2020 | First stage | 4 | 0 | 1 | 3 | 1 | 16 |
| (Chile) 2022 | First stage | 4 | 0 | 0 | 4 | 3 | 31 |
| (Ecuador) 2024 | First stage | 4 | 0 | 0 | 4 | 0 | 12 |
| (Paraguay) 2026 | Group stage | 4 | 0 | 0 | 4 | 0 | 17 |
| Total | 12/12 | 52 | 7 | 10 | 35 | 41 | 161 |
