= Club Atlético Independiente (women) =

Independiente
- Full name: Club Atlético Independiente
- Nickname(s): Las Diablas (The Devils); El Rojo (The Red)
- Founded: 1991; 34 years ago
- Ground: Estadio Libertadores de América, Avellaneda, Argentina
- Capacity: 48,069
- President: Hugo Moyano
- Manager: Pablo Goglino
- League: Campeonato de Fútbol Femenino
- 2020: Quarterfinals
- Website: https://clubaindependiente.com.ar/futbol/femenino
| Home colours | Away colours | Third colours |

Club Atlético Independiente Women (Spanish pronunciation: [ˈkluβ aˈtletikojndepenˈdjente]) is the women's association football section of the homonymous sports club, which has its headquarters and stadium in the city of Avellaneda in Greater Buenos Aires. They currently play in the Campeonato de Fútbol Femenino.

== History ==
Club Atlético Independiente was one of eight teams participating in the first Argentine amateur women's football season in 1991.

So far, their best results in Primera División A were the three consecutive runner-ups achieved in the Clausura 2002, Apertura 2002 tournaments (where, when they were equal in points with River Plate, the championship was defined by means of a tiebreaker match) and Clausura 2003. Independiente's only relegation to Primera División B was in the 2016–17 season. In this division, they remained for only one season, since they had a successful campaign of 30 wins, 3 draws, 1 single defeat, and more than 100 goals, they became champion of the 2017-18 Primera División B season, achieving promotion and returning to Primera División A, where they have been playing intermittently since 1991.

In 2019, Independiente participated in the first season of the professional era in Argentina women's football. On the 8th round of said season, they played at the Estadio Libertadores de América for the first time in history.

== Honours ==
- Primera División B (1): 2017-18
