= Luana Chamochumbi =

Peruvian professional footballer

Luana Chamochumbi Chavez (born 20 February 2006) is a Peruvian professional footballer who currently plays for Universitario de Deportes and the Peru women's national football team. She signed with Universitario in 2023, having previously played for Sporting Cristal and the Peru U-17 national team. She was named to the Peruvian squad for the 2025-26 CONMEBOL Women's Nations League in February 2025. In 2026, she was named to the Peruvian squad for the 2026 South American Women's Under-20 Championship.
