= Estadio Luis Alfonso Giagni =

Stadium in Villa Elisa, Paragua

Coordinates: 25.367314°S 57.58486°W

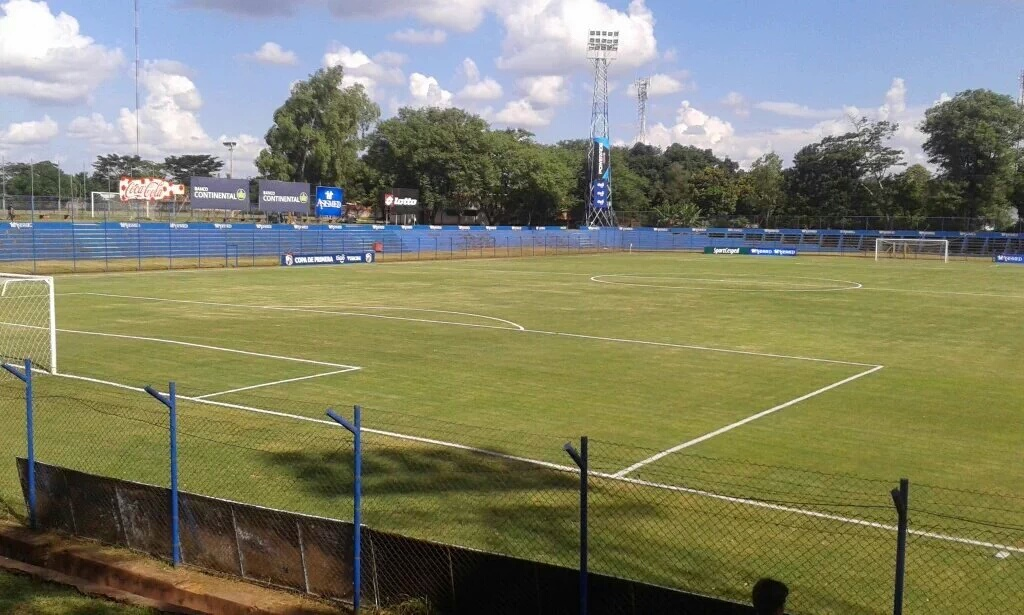
- Interactive map of Estadio Luis Alfonso Giagni
- Full name: Estadio Luis Alfonso Giagni
- Location: Villa Elisa, Paraguay
- Capacity: 11,000
- Surface: Grass
- Field size: 105x70

Construction
- Opened: 1984

Tenant
- Sol de América

Estadio Luis Alfonso Giagni is a multi-use stadium in Villa Elisa, Paraguay. It is currently used mostly for football matches and is the home stadium of Club Sol de América, who have played there since it was opened in 1984. The stadium holds 11,000 people.
