= Annika Paz =

Argentine footballer (born 2008)

Personal information
- Date of birth: 16 November 2008 (age 17)
- Place of birth: Pilar, Argentina
- Position: Forward

Team information
- Current team: Sassuolo (on loan from Inter Milan)

Youth career
- 2021–2024: River Plate

Senior career*
Years	Team	Apps	(Gls)
2024–2025	River Plate		
2026–	Inter Milan	3	(0)
2026–	→ Sassuolo (loan)	2	(0)

International career
2024–2025	Argentina U17		
2024–	Argentina U20		
2025–	Argentina	1	(1)
- * Club domestic league appearances and goals as of 00:31, 5 October 2026 (UTC)

Annika Paz (born 16 November 2008) is an Argentine professional footballer who plays as a forward for Serie A club Sassuolo, on loan from Inter Milan, and the Argentina national team.

== Club career ==
Paz got interested in football through her father and brother at home, and started playing with her brother's team in a local league.

In 2021, at the age of 13, Paz tried out for and was selected to join the River Plate girls youth team. Progressing on to the senior team in 2024, she made her first team debut at age 15 and on 30 November 2024, she scored her first goal, in a victory against Belgrano.

On 27 January 2026, Paz arrived in Italy, joining Inter Milan. In September 2026, she was sent on a one-year loan to Sassuolo.

== International career ==
Paz has been a recurring figure in Argentina's youth national teams. She captained the under-17 team that competed in the South American U-17 Championship in Paraguay in March 2024, and subsequently was part of the under-20 squad in the South American Under-20 Championship in Ecuador later that year, a tournament in which Argentina qualified for the U-20 World Cup after 12 years, although Paz was ultimately not called up to participate.

On 28 October 2025, Paz made her debut for the senior national team, during a 2025–26 CONMEBOL Women's Nations League match against Uruguay, in which she scored the goal that made it 2–2. With this goal, she became the youngest scorer for the South American national team at the age of 16.

Paz was included in the Argentina squad for the 2026 FIFA U-20 Women's World Cup.

== Career statistics ==
=== International ===
Scores and results list Argentina's goal tally first, score column indicates score after each Paz goal.

List of international goals scored by Annika Paz
No.	Date	Venue	Opponent	Score	Result	Competition
1	28 October 2025	Estadio Centenario, Montevideo, Uruguay	Uruguay	2–2	2–2	2025–26 CONMEBOL Women's Nations League

== Honours ==
Individual

- FIFA U-20 Women's World Cup Silver Boot: 2026
