= Kishi Núñez =

Argentine footballer (born 2006)

Personal information
- Full name: Kishi Denise Núñez
- Date of birth: 17 May 2006 (age 20)
- Place of birth: Isidro Casanova, Buenos Aires, Argentina
- Height: 1.65 m (5 ft 5 in)
- Position: Forward

Team information
- Current team: Boca Juniors
- Number: 11

Youth career
- 2019–2021: Almirante Brown

Senior career*
| Years | Team | Apps | (Gls) |
| 2021–2022 | Argentinos Juniors | | |
| 2022– | Boca Juniors | | |

International career^{‡}
- Argentina U15
- Argentina U17
- Argentina U20
| 2024– | Argentina | 19 | (5) |
Medal record
Women's football
Representing Argentina
Copa América Femenina
| Third place | 2025 Ecuador |
- * Club domestic league appearances and goals as of 17 February 2024 ‡ National team caps and goals as of 18 April 2026

Kishi Denise Núñez (born 17 May 2006) is an Argentine professional footballer who plays as a forward for Campeonato Femenino club Boca Juniors and the Argentina women's national team.

== Club career ==
=== Argentinos Juniors ===
Núñez made her top-flight debut with Argentinos Juniors, in the Primera B, on 22 August 2021. She scored thirty goals for El Bicho, becoming the top scorer in their history, surpassing Agustina Occhiuzzi and Luana Mendizábal.

=== Boca Juniors ===
During the 2022 season, Núñez signed with Boca Juniors. She played her first match with the club and scored her first goal on 21 August 2022. In her first appearance as a starter, she scored 3 goals in a 3–1 victory over Racing.

Núñez was also part of the squad that played in the 2022 Copa Libertadores Femenina, scoring a goal against the Brazilian team Corinthians, who were the reigning champions, thus being key in the team's 2–1 victory. Boca Juniors would later lose in the final, but would still achieve a historic performance for an Argentine team, with Núñez herself being a very important asset.

== International career ==
=== Junior ===
Núñez was called up to the Argentina U-15 team in May 2020 by Diego Guacci and Bárbara Abot.

Núñez was part of the U-17 team that participated in the 2022 South American U-17 Women's Championship.

Also in 2022, she was called up for the first time to the U-20 team for the L'Alcúdia International Football Tournament, a tournament in which they finished runners-up after losing 2–1 to Villarreal in the final.

On 23 August 2024, Núñez was confirmed as part of the 21-player squad drawn up by coach Christian Meloni to represent Argentina at the U-20 World Cup that same year.

=== Senior ===
Núñez made her senior debut with the women's national team on 31 May 2024, in the 2–0 victory against Costa Rica.

In June 2025, Núñez was named to the senior national team for the 2025 Copa América Femenina.

== Career statistics ==
=== International ===
As of match played 14 April 2026

Appearances and goals by national team and year
| National team | Year | Apps | Goals |
|---|---|---|---|
| Argentina | 2024 | 4 | 1 |
| Argentina | 2025 | 13 | 4 |
| Argentina | 2026 | 2 | 0 |
| Total | | 19 | 5 |

=== International goals ===
Scores and results list Argentina's goal tally first

| No. | Date | Venue | Opponent | Score | Result | Competition |
|---|---|---|---|---|---|---|
| 1 | 30 November 2024 | Beyond Bancard Field, Davie, United States | Colombia | 1–0 | 1–1 (5–4 p) | Friendly |
| 2 | 2 June 2025 | GIO Stadium, Canberra, Australia | Australia | 1–1 | 1–4 | Friendly |
| 3 | 24 July 2025 | Estadio Banco Guayaquil, Quito, Ecuador | Ecuador | 1–0 | 2–0 | 2025 Copa América Femenina |
| 4 | 2 December 2025 | Estadio Florencio Sola, Banfield, Argentina | Bolivia | 5–0 | 8–0 | 2025–26 CONMEBOL Women's Nations League |
| 5 | 2 December 2025 | Estadio Florencio Sola, Banfield, Argentina | Bolivia | 7–0 | 8–0 | 2025–26 CONMEBOL Women's Nations League |

== Honours ==
Boca Juniors

- Primera División A: 2022, 2023, A-2024
- Copa de la Liga: 2023
- Copa Federal: 2023
