= Venezuela women's national under-20 football team =

National U-20 association football team

Venezuela
- Association: Federación Venezolana de Fútbol
- Confederation: CONMEBOL (South America)
- Head coach: Angel Hualde
- FIFA code: VEN
First colours	Second colours

World Cup
- Appearances: 2
- Best result: Group stage (2016, 2024)
- Appearances: (first in 2016)

The Venezuelan U-20 women's national football team are the national women's under-20 football team of Venezuela. They are controlled by the Federación Venezolana de Fútbol.

== Records ==
=== U-20 World Cup record ===
Year	Result	Matches	Wins	Draws	Losses	GF	GA
(Canada) 2002	did not qualify						
(Thailand) 2004	did not qualify						
(Russia) 2006	did not qualify						
(Chile) 2008	did not qualify						
(Germany) 2010	did not qualify						
(Japan) 2012	did not qualify						
(Canada) 2014	did not qualify						
(Papua New Guinea) 2016	Group Stage	3	0	0	3	3	9
(France) 2018	did not qualify						
(Costa Rica) 2022	did not qualify						
(Colombia) 2024	Group Stage	3	0	1	2	2	9
(Poland) 2026	Did not qualify						
Total	-	6	0	1	5	5	18

=== South American Championship record ===
South American Championship
Year	Round	Position	GP	W	D	L	GS	GA
(Brazil) 2004	First stage	9th	2	0	0	2	2	7
(Chile) 2006	First stage	8th	4	0	3	1	5	12
(Brazil) 2008	First stage	8th	4	0	3	1	5	6
(Colombia) 2010	First stage	6th	4	2	0	2	6	8
(Brazil) 2012	First stage	8th	4	1	0	3	4	10
(Uruguay) 2014	First stage	5th	4	2	0	2	9	7
(Brazil) 2015	Runners-up	2nd	7	4	2	1	13	7
(Ecuador) 2018	Fourth place	4th	7	2	1	4	4	13
(Chile) 2022	Fourth place	4th	7	3	1	3	8	7
(Ecuador) 2024	Final stage	5th	9	3	1	3	19	16
(Paraguay) 2026	Final stage	6th	9	2	3	4	8	11
Total	-	-	61	19	14	26	86	104

== Players ==
=== Latest squad ===
Squad for the 2024 South American U-20 Women's Championship. Players who were born from 2004 onwards are still eligible for selection.

No.	Pos.	Player	Date of birth (age)	Club
1	GK	Hilary Azuaje	27 October 2004 (aged 19)	
2	DF	Zoraida Blanco	14 June 2006 (aged 17)	
3	DF	Nazly Sánchez	16 May 2005 (aged 18)	
4	DF	Katherine Lobatón	17 February 2005 (aged 19)	
5	DF	Verónica Da Silva	20 December 2004 (aged 19)	
6	DF	Cristina Rivas	7 September 2005 (aged 18)	
7	FW	Froriangel Apóstol	7 September 2005 (aged 18)	
8	MF	Susanna Calvetti	20 June 2006 (aged 17)	
9	FW	Mariana Barreto	12 March 2004 (aged 20)	
10	MF	Marianyela Jiménez	16 April 2004 (aged 19)	
11	MF	Andrea Cova	1 October 2006 (aged 17)	
12	GK	Tibayre Rodríguez	9 August 2004 (aged 19)	
13	FW	Karelis Alvarado	3 September 2005 (aged 18)	
14	FW	Gabriela González	17 May 2005 (aged 18)	
15	MF	Claudia Pérez	10 July 2008 (aged 15)	
16	FW	Rebecca Vega	15 June 2005 (aged 18)	
17	MF	Fabiana Vásquez	20 July 2005 (aged 18)	
18	MF	Alexa Majano	6 July 2005 (aged 18)	
19	FW	Francelis Graterol	29 March 2006 (aged 18)	
20	FW	Camila Madriz	4 June 2005 (aged 18)	
21	MF	Shakiana Dagher	22 August 2005 (aged 18)	
22	GK	Jaelyn Bracamonte	20 October 2006 (aged 17)	

== See also ==
- Venezuela women's national football team (Senior)
- Football in Venezuela

== Head-to-head record ==
The following table shows Venezuela's head-to-head record in the FIFA U-20 Women's World Cup.

Opponent	Pld	W	D	L	GF	GA	GD	Win %
Germany	2	0	0	2	3	8	−5	0.00
Mexico	1	0	0	1	2	3	−1	0.00
Nigeria	1	0	0	1	0	4	−4	0.00
South Korea	2	0	1	1	0	3	−3	0.00
Total	6	0	1	5	5	18	−13	0.00
