= Paraguay women's national under-20 football team =

The Paraguayan U-20 women's national football team is the national under-20 women's association football team of Paraguay. They are controlled by the Asociación Paraguaya de Fútbol. They finished 2nd in their debut at the South American Under-20 Women's Football Championship.

== Records ==
=== FIFA U-20 Women's World Cup ===
Year	Round	Pld	W	D	L	GF	GA
(Canada) 2002	Did not enter						
(Thailand) 2004	Did not qualify						
(Russia) 2006	Did not qualify						
(Chile) 2008	Did not qualify						
(Germany) 2010	Did not qualify						
(Japan) 2012	Did not qualify						
(Canada) 2014	Group stage	3	1	0	2	2	6
(Papua New Guinea) 2016	Did not qualify						
(France) 2018	Group stage	3	0	0	3	1	16
(Costa Rica) 2022	Did not qualify						
(Colombia) 2024	Group stage	3	1	0	2	2	9
(Poland) 2026	Did not qualify						
Total	3/12	9	2	0	7	5	31

=== CONMEBOL Sub 20 Femenina ===
Year	Round	Position	GP	W	D	L	GS	GA
(Brazil) 2004	2nd Place	2nd	5	4	0	1	12	7
(Chile) 2006	3rd Place	3rd	7	4	1	2	13	11
(Brazil) 2008	3rd Place	3rd	7	2	2	3	15	18
(Colombia) 2010	3rd Place	3rd	6	4	0	2	20	5
(Brazil) 2012	4th Place	4th	7	2	2	3	9	15
(Uruguay) 2014	2nd Place	2nd	7	5	1	1	15	3
(Brazil) 2015	Group stage	7th	4	1	1	2	8	12
(Ecuador) 2018	2nd Place	2nd	7	6	0	1	23	13
(Chile) 2022	Group stage	6th	4	1	0	3	4	9
(Ecuador) 2024	2nd Place	2nd	9	5	3	1	12	9
(Paraguay) 2026	Final stage	5th	9	2	3	4	9	15
Total	11/11	0 Titles	72	38	15	24	140	116

== Head-to-head record ==
The following table shows Paraguay's head-to-head record in the FIFA U-20 Women's World Cup.

Opponent	Pld	W	D	L	GF	GA	GD	Win %
Costa Rica	1	1	0	0	2	1	+1	100.00
France	1	0	0	1	0	3	−3	0.00
Japan	1	0	0	1	0	6	−6	0.00
Morocco	1	1	0	0	2	0	+2	100.00
New Zealand	1	0	0	1	0	2	−2	0.00
Spain	2	0	0	2	1	6	−5	0.00
United States	2	0	0	2	0	13	−13	0.00
Total	9	2	0	7	5	31	−26	22.22

== See also ==
- Paraguay women's national football team (Senior)
- Paraguay women's national under-17 football team
- Paraguay men's national under-20 football team
- Football in Paraguay
