= 2014 Torneio Internacional de Brasília de Futebol Feminino squads =

The 2014 Torneio Internacional de Brasília de Futebol Feminino (also known as the 2014 International Tournament of Brasilia) is an invitational football tournament held every December in Brazil. The 2014 tournament ran from December 10–21, 2014.

Tournament rules allow a 23-member roster. Players marked (c) were named as captain for their national squad. Totals for caps and goals, club affiliations, and ages are as of the opening day of the tournament on 10 December 2014.

== Squads ==
=== Argentina ===
Coach: Julio Olarticoechea

The Argentine Football Association (AFA) announced a list of 20 players who would travel to Brazil.

No.	Pos.	Player	Date of birth (age)	Caps	Club
1	GK	Elisabeth Minnig	6 January 1987 (aged 27)		(Argentina) Boca Juniors
22	GK	Laurina Oliveros	10 September 1993 (aged 21)		(Argentina) UAI Urquiza
2	DF	Florencia Quiñones	26 August 1986 (aged 28)		(Argentina) San Lorenzo
3	DF	Noelia Espíndola	6 April 1992 (aged 22)		(Argentina) San Lorenzo
4	DF	Agustina Barroso	20 May 1993 (aged 21)		(Argentina) UAI Urquiza
6	DF	Adriana Sachs	25 December 1993 (aged 20)		(Argentina) Huracán
16	DF	Cecilia Ghigo	16 January 1995 (aged 19)		(Argentina) Boca Juniors
17	DF	Aldana Cometti	3 March 1996 (aged 18)		(Argentina) Boca Juniors
	DF	Luana Muñoz	22 January 1999 (aged 15)		(Argentina) River Plate
	DF	Cecilia López	10 July 1996 (aged 18)		(Argentina) San Lorenzo
5	MF	Fabiana Vallejos (c)	30 July 1985 (aged 29)		(Argentina) Boca Juniors
11	MF	Florencia Bonsegundo	14 July 1993 (aged 21)		(Argentina) UAI Urquiza
13	MF	Camila Gómez Ares	26 October 1994 (aged 19)		(Argentina) Boca Juniors
21	MF	Karen Vénica	25 January 1992 (aged 22)		(Argentina) UAI Urquiza
8	FW	Mariana Larroquette	24 October 1992 (aged 21)		(Argentina) River Plate
9	FW	Sole Jaimes	20 January 1989 (aged 25)		(Brazil) Foz Cataratas
15	FW	Yael Oviedo	22 May 1992 (aged 22)		(Brazil) Foz Cataratas
	FW	Daniela Kippes	19 January 1994 (aged 20)		(Argentina) Boca Juniors
	FW	Débora Molina	14 February 1985 (aged 29)		(Argentina) San Lorenzo
		Laura Sampedro			(Argentina) Estudiantes (LP)

=== Brazil ===
Coach: Vadão

The Brazilian Football Confederation (CBF) announced a squad of 23 players on 8 December 2014.

No.	Pos.	Player	Date of birth (age)	Caps	Goals	Club
1	GK	Luciana	July 24, 1987 (age 38)	5	0	(Brazilian Football Confederation) Ferroviária
12	GK	Thaís Picarte	July 22, 1982 (age 43)	29	0	(Brazilian Football Confederation) Centro Olímpico
22	GK	Andréia	September 14, 1977 (aged 33)	71	0	(Brazilian Football Confederation) Portuguesa
3	DF	Bruna (captain)	October 16, 1985 (age 40)	34	3	(Brazilian Football Confederation) São José
4	DF	Tayla	May 9, 1992 (age 33)	10	1	(Brazilian Football Confederation) Ferroviária
15	DF	Monica	April 21, 1987 (age 39)	2	0	(Brazilian Football Confederation) Ferroviária
13	DF	Poliana	February 6, 1991 (age 35)	19	2	(Brazilian Football Confederation) São José
16	DF	Tamires	October 10, 1987 (age 38)	20	3	(Brazilian Football Confederation) Centro Olímpico
17	MF	Beatriz	December 17, 1993 (age 32)	12	0	(Korea Football Association) Hyundai Red Angels
8	MF	Formiga	March 3, 1978 (age 48)	98	14	(Brazilian Football Confederation) São José
5	MF	Thaisa	December 17, 1988 (age 37)	18	2	(Brazilian Football Confederation) Ferroviária
18	MF	Andressinha	May 1, 1995 (age 30)	5	0	(Brazilian Football Confederation) Kindermann
9	MF	Andressa	November 10, 1992 (age 33)	27	5	(Brazilian Football Confederation) São José
7	MF	Maurine	January 14, 1986 (age 40)	49	6	(Brazilian Football Confederation) Ferroviária
21	MF	Raquel	March 21, 1991 (age 35)	12	2	(Brazilian Football Confederation) Ferroviária
19	FW	Darlene	January 11, 1990 (age 36)	15	3	(Brazilian Football Confederation) Rio Preto
10	FW	Marta	February 19, 1986 (age 40)	73	82	(Swedish Football Association) FC Rosengård

=== China ===
Coach: Hao Wei

No.	Pos.	Player	Date of birth (age)	Caps	Goals	Club
	GK	Zhang Yue	30 September 1990 (age 35)			(Chinese Football Association) Beijing Baxy
	GK	Wang Fei	22 March 1990 (age 36)			(Chinese Football Association) Dalian Aerbin
	DF	Liu Shanshan	16 March 1992 (age 34)			(Chinese Football Association) Hebei Zhongji
	DF	Li Jiayue	8 June 1990 (age 35)			(Chinese Football Association) Shanghai
	DF	Wu Haiyan	26 February 1993 (age 33)			(Korea Football Association) Daejeon Sportstoto
	DF	Li Dongna	6 December 1988 (age 37)			(Chinese Football Association) Tianjin Huisen
	DF	Lü Siqi	4 January 1995 (age 31)			(Chinese Football Association) Liberation Army
	MF	Han Peng	20 December 1989 (age 36)			(Chinese Football Association) Tianjin Huisen
	MF	Zhang Rui	27 January 1989 (age 37)			(Chinese Football Association) Liberation Army
	MF	Wang Shanshan	27 January 1990 (age 36)			(Chinese Football Association) Tianjin Huisen
	MF	Ren Guixin	19 December 1988 (age 37)			(Chinese Football Association) Changchun Dazhong Zhuoyue
	MF	Lei Jiahui	20 September 1995 (age 30)			(Chinese Football Association) Henan
	MF	Tan Ruyin	17 July 1994 (age 31)			(Chinese Football Association) Guangdong
	MF	Tang Jiali	16 March 1995 (age 31)			(Chinese Football Association) Shanghai
	FW	Lou Jiahui	26 May 1991 (age 34)			(Chinese Football Association) Henan
	FW	Li Ying	7 January 1993 (age 33)			(Chinese Football Association) Shandong Yuehai
	FW	Gao Qi	21 August 1991 (age 34)			(Chinese Football Association) Guangdong
	FW	Gu Yasha	28 November 1990 (age 35)			(Chinese Football Association) Beijing Baxy
	FW	Zhao Rong				(Chinese Football Association) Beijing Baxy
	FW	Wang Shuang	23 January 1995 (age 31)			(Chinese Football Association) Wuhan Jianghan University

=== United States ===
Coach: Jill Ellis

No.	Pos.	Player	Date of birth (age)	Caps	Goals	Club
	GK	Hope Solo	July 30, 1981 (age 44)	159	0	(United States Soccer Federation) Seattle Reign FC
	GK	Ashlyn Harris	October 19, 1985 (age 40)	4	0	(United States Soccer Federation) Washington Spirit
	GK	Alyssa Naeher	April 20, 1988 (age 38)	0	0	(United States Soccer Federation) Boston Breakers
	DF	Christie Rampone (captain)	June 24, 1975 (age 50)	301	4	(United States Soccer Federation) Sky Blue FC
	DF	Becky Sauerbrunn	June 6, 1985 (age 40)	67	0	(United States Soccer Federation) FC Kansas City
	DF	Ali Krieger	July 28, 1984 (age 41)	53	1	(United States Soccer Federation) Washington Spirit
	DF	Kelley O'Hara	August 4, 1988 (age 37)	49	0	(United States Soccer Federation) Sky Blue FC
	DF	Whitney Engen	November 28, 1987 (age 38)	22	3	(United States Soccer Federation) Western New York Flash
	DF	Meghan Klingenberg	August 2, 1988 (age 37)	21	1	(United States Soccer Federation) Houston Dash
	DF	Crystal Dunn	July 3, 1992 (age 33)	12	0	(United States Soccer Federation) Washington Spirit
	DF	Julie Johnston	April 6, 1992 (age 34)	4	0	(United States Soccer Federation) Chicago Red Stars
	MF	Heather O'Reilly	January 2, 1985 (age 41)	212	41	(United States Soccer Federation) Boston Breakers
	MF	Carli Lloyd	July 16, 1982 (age 43)	181	56	(United States Soccer Federation) Houston Dash
	MF	Lauren Holiday	September 30, 1987 (age 38)	110	23	(United States Soccer Federation) FC Kansas City
	MF	Megan Rapinoe	July 5, 1985 (age 40)	92	28	(United States Soccer Federation) Seattle Reign FC
	MF	Lori Chalupny	January 29, 1984 (age 42)	92	8	(United States Soccer Federation) Chicago Red Stars
	MF	Tobin Heath	May 29, 1988 (age 37)	81	11	(United States Soccer Federation) Portland Thorns FC
	MF	Morgan Brian	February 26, 1993 (age 33)	16	3	(United States Soccer Federation) Virginia
	MF	Sam Mewis	October 9, 1992 (age 33)	2	0	(United States Soccer Federation) UCLA
	FW	Abby Wambach	June 2, 1980 (age 45)	228	177	(United States Soccer Federation) Western New York Flash
	FW	Amy Rodriguez	February 17, 1987 (age 39)	113	28	(United States Soccer Federation) FC Kansas City
	FW	Alex Morgan	July 2, 1989 (age 36)	77	49	(United States Soccer Federation) Portland Thorns FC
	FW	Sydney Leroux	May 7, 1990 (age 35)	61	33	(United States Soccer Federation) Seattle Reign FC
	FW	Christen Press	December 29, 1988 (age 37)	32	15	(United States Soccer Federation) Chicago Red Stars
