= 2010 Copa Libertadores Femenina =

2010 Copa Libertadores de Fútbol Femenino
Tournament details
- Host country: Brazil
- Dates: 2 October – 17 October
- Teams: 10 (from 10 associations)
- Venue: 1 (in 1 host city)

Final positions
- Champions: (Brazil) Santos
- Runners-up: (Chile) Everton
- Third place: (Argentina) Boca Juniors
- Fourth place: (Ecuador) Deportivo Quito

Tournament statistics
- Matches played: 24
- Goals scored: 103 (4.29 per match)
- Top scorer(s): (Paraguay) Noelia Cuevas (Paraguay) Gloria Villamayor (8 goals each)

The 2010 Copa Libertadores de Fútbol Femenino was the second edition of the Copa Libertadores de Fútbol Femenino, CONMEBOL's premier annual international women's club tournament. The competition was played in São Paulo state, Brazil, from 2 to 17 October 2010. Santos were the defending champions and successfully defended their title, without conceding a single goal. All matches were played at Arena Barueri in Barueri.

Gloria Villamayor and Noelia Cuevas won the top scorer award with 8 goals each.

== Qualified teams ==
Association	Team	Qualifying method
Argentina	Boca Juniors	2009–10 Clausura/Apertura champions-playoff winner
Bolivia	Deportivo Florida	2010 Bolivian League champion
Brazil	Santos	2009 Copa do Brasil de Futebol Feminino winner
Chile	Everton	2009 Chilean League champion
Colombia	Formas Íntimas	won playoff against other regional league champion
Ecuador	Deportivo Quito	entry awarded by the Ecuadorian Football Federation (no national league)
Paraguay	Universidad Autónoma	2009 Paraguayan league champions
Peru	UPI	2009 Campeonato Nacional de Fútbol Femenino winner
Uruguay	River Plate	2009 Campeonato Uruguayo Femenino winner
Venezuela	Caracas	2010 Venezuelan League champions

== Venue ==
Barueri
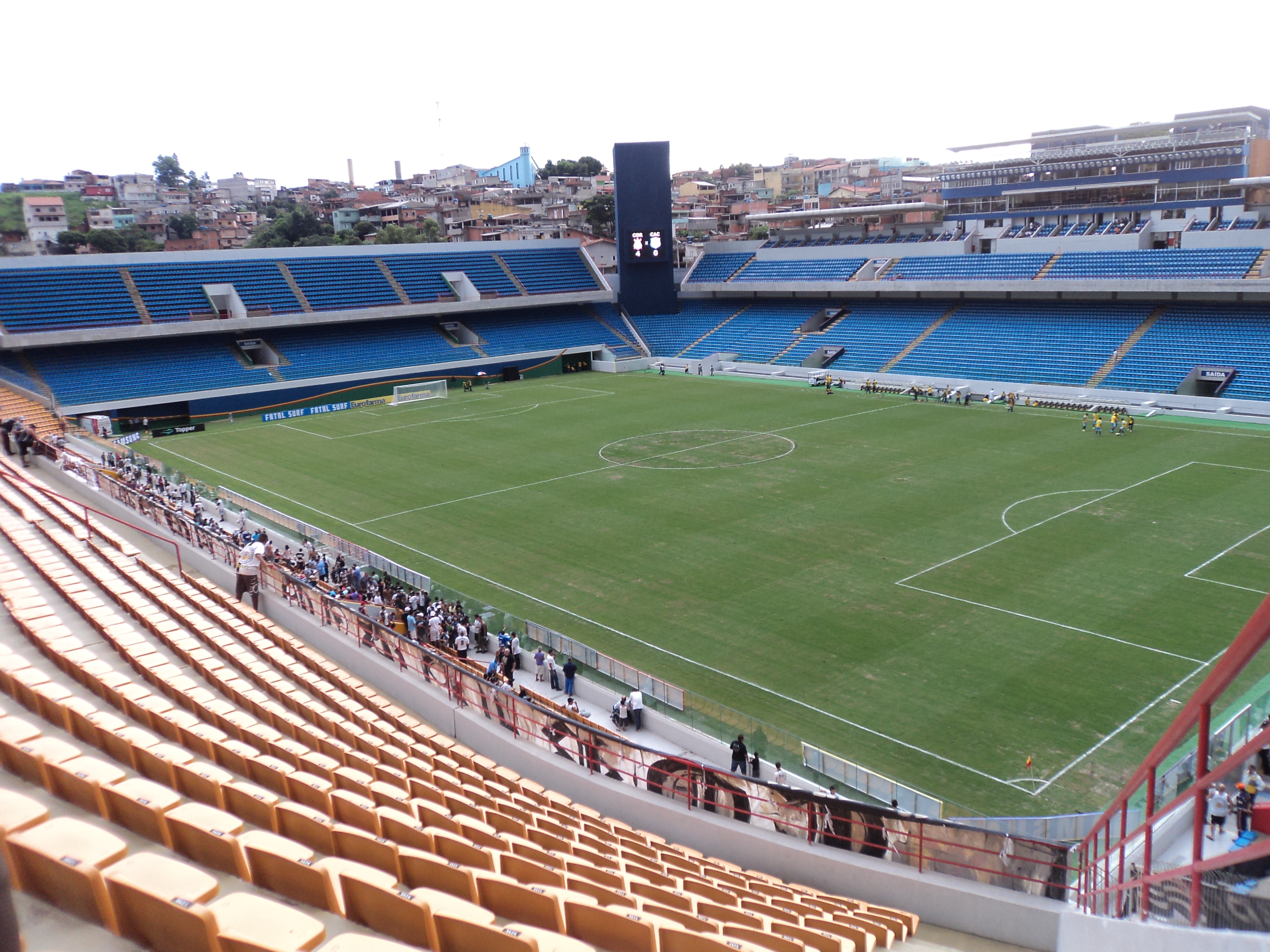
Arena Barueri
Capacity: 35,000

== Round and draw dates ==
The draw for the competition took place on 13 September 2010.

Round	Draw	Competition Dates
First Stage	13 September 2010	2–12 October 2010
Semifinals	13 September 2010	15 October 2010
Final	13 September 2010	17 October 2010

== First stage ==
The top two teams from each group advanced to the semifinals.

Key to colors in group tables
Group winners and runners-up advanced to the Semifinals

=== Group A ===
Team	Pld	W	D	L	GF	GA	GD	Pts
(Brazil) Santos	4	4	0	0	22	0	+22	12
(Ecuador) Deportivo Quito	4	2	1	1	3	8	−5	7
(Uruguay) River Plate	4	1	1	2	4	15	−11	4
(Venezuela) Caracas	4	1	0	3	5	7	−2	3
(Colombia) Formas Íntimas	4	1	0	3	4	8	−4	3

Match times are local time (UTC−3).

2 October 2010
10:00

Santos (Brazil)	2–0	(Venezuela) Caracas
Grazi 13'; Cristiane 48' (pen.)	Report

Arena Barueri, Barueri
Attendance: 150
Referee: Cynthia Franco (Paraguay)

2 October 2010
12:15

Deportivo Quito (Ecuador)	1–1	(Uruguay) River Plate
Vásquez 67'	Report	Laborda 83'

Arena Barueri, Barueri
Attendance: 80
Referee: Salomé Di Iorio (Argentina)

5 October 2010
17:45

Formas Íntimas (Colombia)	3–1	(Venezuela) Caracas
Peñaloza 5'; Montoya 35'; Usme 80'	Report	Ascanio 9'

Arena Barueri, Barueri
Attendance: 100
Referee: Melany Bermejo (Peru)

5 October 2010
20:00

Santos (Brazil)	9–0	(Uruguay) River Plate
Cristiane 19' (pen.); Grazi 32', 39', 64'; Ester 38'; Thais 50', 90' (pen.); Joice 53'; Pikena 63'	Report

Arena Barueri, Barueri
Attendance: 350
Referee: Sirley Cornejo (Bolivia)

7 October 2010
17:00

River Plate (Uruguay)	1–4	(Venezuela) Caracas

Arena Barueri, Barueri

7 October 2010
19:15

Formas Íntimas (Colombia)	0–1	(Ecuador) Deportivo Quito

Arena Barueri, Barueri

9 October 2010
12:00

Santos (Brazil)	4–0	(Colombia) Formas Íntimas
	Report

Arena Barueri, Barueri

9 October 2010
14:15

Deportivo Quito (Ecuador)	1–0	(Venezuela) Caracas
	Report

Arena Barueri, Barueri

11 October 2010
16:00

Santos (Brazil)	7–0	(Ecuador) Deportivo Quito
	Report

Arena Barueri, Barueri

11 October 2010
18:15

Formas Íntimas (Colombia)	1–2	(Uruguay) River Plate
	Report

Arena Barueri, Barueri

=== Group B ===
Team	Pld	W	D	L	GF	GA	GD	Pts
(Chile) Everton	4	3	1	0	18	2	+16	10
(Argentina) Boca Juniors	4	2	2	0	19	5	+14	8
(Paraguay) Universidad Autónoma	4	2	1	1	16	5	+11	7
(Bolivia) Deportivo Florida	4	1	0	3	4	17	−13	3
(Peru) UPI	4	0	0	4	2	30	−28	0

Match times are local time (UTC−3).

4 October 2010
17:00

Boca Juniors (Argentina)	4–1	(Bolivia) Deportivo Florida
Brusca 20'; Gómez 22'; Gatti 53', 73'	Report	Méndez 23'

Arena Barueri, Barueri
Referee: Yeimy Martínez (Colombia)

4 October 2010
19:15

Everton (Chile)	9–0	(Peru) UPI
Villamayor 5' (?); López (?); Arias (?); Vidal (?)	Report

Arena Barueri, Barueri
Referee: Claudia Umpiérrez (Uruguay)

6 October 2010
10:00

UPI (Peru)	1–2	(Bolivia) Deportivo Florida
Puerta 20'	Report	Pedraza 54'; Zenteno 62'

Arena Barueri, Barueri
Attendance: 50
Referee: Betty Tobar (Ecuador)

6 October 2010
12:15

Universidad Autónoma (Paraguay)	1–2	(Chile) Everton
Vázquez 52' (pen.)	Report	Villamayor 2'; Arias 63'

Arena Barueri, Barueri
Attendance: 50
Referee: Simone Xavier (Brazil)

8 October 2010
17:00

Boca Juniors (Argentina)	12–1	(Peru) UPI
Ojeda 4', 28', 33', 69'; Gatti 15', 43'; Huber 18', 23'; Gerez 36'; Gómez 55'; Barbitta 64'; Santana 72'	Report	Flores 61'

Arena Barueri, Barueri
Attendance: 60
Referee: Yercinia Correa (Venezuela)

8 October 2010
19:15

Universidad Autónoma (Paraguay)	6–1	(Bolivia) Deportivo Florida
N. Cuevas 5', 55'; Zalazar 9'; Agüero 15'; I. Cuevas 28', 49'	Report	Zenteno 74'

Arena Barueri, Barueri
Attendance: 90
Referee: Yeimy Martínez (Colombia)

10 October 2010
12:00

Boca Juniors (Argentina)	2–2	(Paraguay) Universidad Autónoma
Brusca 62'; Ojeda 72'	Report	Riveros 23'; Vázquez 88' (pen.)

Arena Barueri, Barueri
Referee: Simone Xavier (Brazil)

10 October 2010
14:15

Everton (Chile)	6–0	(Bolivia) Deportivo Florida
Villamayor 3'; Arias 22', 45+3', 89'; Pardo 66'; Salgado 79'	Report

Arena Barueri, Barueri
Referee: Claudia Umpiérrez (Uruguay)

12 October 2010
17:00

Boca Juniors (Argentina)	1–1	(Chile) Everton
Gerez 75'	Report	Arias 65'

Arena Barueri, Barueri
Attendance: 60
Referee: Yeimy Martínez (Colombia)

12 October 2010
19:15

Universidad Autónoma (Paraguay)	7–0	(Peru) UPI
N. Cuevas 14', 22', 24', 59', 73', 77'; I. Cuevas 48'	Report

Arena Barueri, Barueri
Attendance: 60
Referee: Yercinia Correa (Venezuela)

== Final stages ==
Semi-finals
15 October—Barueri
(Chile) Everton	0 (5)
(Ecuador) Deportivo Quito	0 (4)
15 October—Barueri
(Brazil) Santos	2
(Argentina) Boca Juniors	0

Final
17 October — Barueri
(Chile) Everton	0
(Brazil) Santos	1
Third place
17 October — Barueri
(Ecuador) Deportivo Quito	1
(Argentina) Boca Juniors	2

=== Semifinals ===
15 October 2010
16:00

Everton (Chile)	0–0	(Ecuador) Deportivo Quito
	Report
Penalties
Galeano (penalty scored); Arias (penalty scored); Cisternas (penalty scored); Salgado (penalty scored); Endler (penalty scored)	5–4	Freire (penalty scored); Rodríguez (penalty scored); Espinoza (penalty scored); Moreira (penalty scored); Ferrín (penalty missed)

Arena Barueri, Barueri

15 October 2010
19:00

Santos (Brazil)	2–0	(Argentina) Boca Juniors
Maurine 74'; Suzana 78'	Report

Arena Barueri, Barueri

=== Third place match ===
17 October 2010
09:45

Deportivo Quito (Ecuador)	1–2	(Argentina) Boca Juniors
Quinteros 82'	Report	Cotelo 39'; González 68'

Arena Barueri, Barueri

=== Final ===
17 October 2010
12:00

Everton (Chile)	0–1	(Brazil) Santos
	Report; Video report	Maurine 89'

Arena Barueri, Barueri

Everton	Santos

GK	1	(Chile) Christiane Endler
DF	20	(Chile) Su Helen Galaz
DF	2	(Chile) Yocelyn Cisternas
DF	17	(Chile) Yina Bravo
DF	13	(Chile) Camila Sáez
DF	19	(Chile) Yarella Torres
MF	5	(Paraguay) Joanna Galeano
MF	6	(Chile) Daniela Pardo	Substituted off
MF	8	(Chile) Janet Salgado	(substituted off) 76'
FW	16	(Paraguay) Dulce María Quintana
FW	9	(Chile) Gloria Villamayor	Substituted off
Substitutes:
FW	11	(Chile) Carina Morales	Substituted on
FW	7	(Colombia) Ingrid Vidal	(substituted on) 76'
FW	15	(Chile) Valeska Arias	Substituted on
Manager:
(Paraguay) Mario Vera

GK	12	(Brazil) Andréia Suntaque
DF	2	(Brazil) Renata Costa
DF	5	(Brazil) Aline Pellegrino (c)
DF	14	(Iceland) Þórunn	Substituted off
MF	10	(Brazil) Maurine
MF	15	(Brazil) Ester
MF	4	(Brazil) Joice	Substituted off
MF	17	(Brazil) Thais
FW	7	(Brazil) Pikena	Substituted off
FW	20	(Brazil) Grazi
FW	11	(Brazil) Cristiane
Substitutes:
DF	3	(Brazil) Dani	Substituted on
FW	9	(Brazil) Suzana	Substituted on
FW	19	(Brazil) Beatriz	Substituted on
Manager:
(Brazil) Kleiton Lima

Copa Libertadores de Fútbol Femenino
2010 Champion

Santos
Second Title

== Top scorer ==
The top of the goal scoring table.

Rank	Name	Team	Goals
1	Gloria Villamayor	(Chile) Everton	8
1	Noelia Cuevas	(Paraguay) Universidad Autónoma	8
3	Grazi	(Brazil) Santos	7
3	Cristiane	(Brazil) Santos	7
