= 2021 SheBelieves Cup squads =

List of players competing at the 6th edition of the SheBelieves Cup

This article lists the squads for the 2021 SheBelieves Cup, the 6th edition of the SheBelieves Cup. The cup consisted of a series of friendly games, and was held in the United States from 18 to 24 February 2021. The four national teams involved in the tournament registered a squad of 23 players.

The age listed for each player is on 18 February 2021, the first day of the tournament. The numbers of caps and goals listed for each player do not include any matches played after the start of tournament. The club listed is the club for which the player last played a competitive match prior to the tournament. The nationality for each club reflects the national association (not the league) to which the club is affiliated. A flag is included for coaches that are of a different nationality than their own national team.

== Squads ==
=== Argentina ===
Coach: Carlos Borrello

The preliminary squad was announced on 4 February 2021. The final squad was announced on 14 February 2021. A day later, Yanina Sosa replaced Vanina Correa, due to her testing positive for COVID-19. Two days after that, Sosa tested positive for COVID-19 and was replaced by Laurina Oliveros. On the same day, the Argentine Football Association released the squad numbers.

No.	Pos.	Player	Date of birth (age)	Caps	Goals	Club
1	GK	Solana Pereyra	5 April 1999 (aged 21)	6	0	(Royal Spanish Football Federation) Real Unión Tenerife
2	DF	Agustina Barroso	20 May 1993 (aged 27)	51	1	(Brazilian Football Confederation) Palmeiras
3	DF	Eliana Stábile	26 November 1993 (aged 27)	27	2	(Argentine Football Association) Boca Juniors
4	DF	Marina Delgado	12 June 1995 (aged 25)	1	0	(Argentine Football Association) UAI Urquiza
5	MF	Vanesa Santana	3 September 1990 (aged 30)	44	0	(Royal Spanish Football Federation) Sporting Huelva
6	DF	Aldana Cometti	3 March 1996 (aged 24)	44	4	(Royal Spanish Football Federation) Levante
7	FW	Yael Oviedo	22 May 1992 (aged 28)	33	3	(Colombian Football Federation) Santa Fe
8	MF	Clarisa Huber	22 December 1984 (aged 36)	20	2	(Argentine Football Association) Boca Juniors
9	FW	Sole Jaimes	20 January 1989 (aged 32)	35	6	(Chinese Football Association) Changchun Zhuoyue
10	MF	Dalila Ippólito	24 March 2002 (aged 18)	10	0	(Italian Football Federation) Juventus
11	FW	Yamila Rodríguez	24 January 1998 (aged 23)	16	1	(Argentine Football Association) Boca Juniors
12	GK	Laurina Oliveros	10 September 1993 (aged 27)	7	0	(Argentine Football Association) Boca Juniors
13	MF	Sophia Braun	26 January 2002 (aged 19)	0	0	(United States Soccer Federation) Gonzaga Bulldogs
14	MF	Miriam Mayorga	20 November 1989 (aged 31)	21	0	(Argentine Football Association) Boca Juniors
15	MF	Natalie Juncos	28 December 1990 (aged 30)	11	0	(Argentine Football Association) Racing
16	MF	Lorena Benítez	3 December 1998 (aged 22)	8	0	(Argentine Football Association) Boca Juniors
17	MF	Valentina Cámara	18 November 1993 (aged 27)	5	0	(Royal Spanish Football Federation) Femarguín
18	MF	Romina Núñez	1 January 1994 (aged 27)	0	0	(Argentine Football Association) UAI Urquiza
19	FW	Mariana Larroquette	24 October 1992 (aged 28)	50	25	(United States Soccer Federation) Kansas City
20	MF	Daiana Falfán	14 October 2000 (aged 20)	3	0	(Argentine Football Association) UAI Urquiza
21	DF	Adriana Sachs	25 December 1993 (aged 27)	31	0	(Argentine Football Association) Boca Juniors
22	FW	Milagros Menéndez	23 March 1997 (aged 23)	13	3	(Royal Spanish Football Federation) Granada

=== Brazil ===
Coach: (Sweden) Pia Sundhage

The final squad was announced on 28 January 2021. On 11 February 2021, Kathellen replaced Fabiana, due to her testing positive for COVID-19. On 16 February 2021, Geyse and Valéria replaced Luana and Formiga, due to Paris Saint-Germain denying their release.

No.	Pos.	Player	Date of birth (age)	Caps	Goals	Club
1	GK	Bárbara	4 July 1988 (aged 32)	41	0	(Brazilian Football Confederation) Kindermann
2	DF	Kathellen	26 April 1996 (aged 24)	7	0	(Italian Football Federation) Inter Milan
3	DF	Bruna Benites	16 October 1985 (aged 35)	22	2	(Brazilian Football Confederation) Internacional
4	DF	Rafaelle	18 June 1991 (aged 29)	33	5	(Chinese Football Association) Changchun Zhuoyue
5	FW	Geyse	27 March 1998 (aged 22)	7	0	(Royal Spanish Football Federation) Madrid CFF
6	DF	Tamires	10 October 1987 (aged 33)	103	5	(Brazilian Football Confederation) Corinthians
7	MF	Andressa Alves	10 November 1992 (aged 28)	93	17	(Italian Football Federation) Roma
8	MF	Ivana Fuso	12 March 2001 (aged 19)	0	0	(The Football Association) Manchester United
9	FW	Debinha	20 October 1991 (aged 29)	97	34	(United States Soccer Federation) North Carolina Courage
10	MF	Marta (captain)	19 February 1986 (aged 34)	154	108	(United States Soccer Federation) Orlando Pride
11	FW	Cristiane	15 May 1985 (aged 35)	147	96	(Brazilian Football Confederation) Santos
12	GK	Aline Reis	15 April 1989 (aged 31)	9	0	(Royal Spanish Football Federation) Granadilla
13	MF	Julia Bianchi	7 October 1997 (aged 23)	1	1	(Brazilian Football Confederation) Palmeiras
14	MF	Adriana	17 November 1996 (aged 24)	12	0	(Brazilian Football Confederation) Corinthians
15	MF	Chú	27 February 1990 (aged 30)	11	0	(Brazilian Football Confederation) Palmeiras
16	FW	Bia Zaneratto	17 December 1993 (aged 27)	82	28	(Chinese Football Association) Wuhan Xinjiyuan
17	MF	Andressinha	1 May 1995 (aged 25)	43	10	(Brazilian Football Confederation) Corinthians
18	DF	Camilinha	10 October 1994 (aged 26)	17	2	(Brazilian Football Confederation) Palmeiras
19	FW	Ludmila	11 December 1994 (aged 26)	13	1	(Royal Spanish Football Federation) Atlético Madrid
20	FW	Giovana	21 June 2003 (aged 17)	1	0	(Royal Spanish Football Federation) Barcelona
21	DF	Tainara	21 April 1999 (aged 21)	0	0	(Brazilian Football Confederation) Palmeiras
22	GK	Letícia	13 August 1994 (aged 26)	4	0	(Portuguese Football Federation) Benfica
23	DF	Jucinara	3 June 1993 (aged 27)	8	0	(Royal Spanish Football Federation) Levante
	DF	Antônia	26 April 1994 (aged 26)	3	0	(Royal Spanish Football Federation) Madrid CFF
	FW	Valéria	10 September 1998 (aged 22)	1	1	(Royal Spanish Football Federation) Madrid CFF

=== Canada ===
Coach: (England) Bev Priestman

The preliminary squad was announced on 25 January 2021. The final squad was announced on 16 February 2021.

No.	Pos.	Player	Date of birth (age)	Caps	Goals	Club
1	GK	Stephanie Labbé	October 10, 1986 (aged 34)	72	0	(Swedish Football Association) FC Rosengård
2	DF	Allysha Chapman	January 25, 1989 (aged 32)	75	1	(United States Soccer Federation) Houston Dash
3	DF	Jade Rose	February 12, 2003 (aged 18)	0	0	(Canadian Soccer Association) Super REX Ontario
4	DF	Shelina Zadorsky	October 24, 1992 (aged 28)	66	2	(The Football Association) Tottenham Hotspur
5	DF	Quinn	August 11, 1995 (aged 25)	59	5	(United States Soccer Federation) OL Reign
6	FW	Deanne Rose	March 3, 1999 (aged 21)	48	9	(United States Soccer Federation) Florida Gators
7	MF	Julia Grosso	August 29, 2000 (aged 20)	21	0	(United States Soccer Federation) Texas Longhorns
8	MF	Samantha Chang	July 13, 2000 (aged 20)	0	0	(United States Soccer Federation) South Carolina Gamecocks
9	FW	Evelyne Viens	February 6, 1997 (aged 24)	0	0	(French Football Federation) Paris FC
10	MF	Sarah Stratigakis	March 7, 1999 (aged 21)	2	0	(United States Soccer Federation) Michigan Wolverines
11	MF	Desiree Scott	July 31, 1987 (aged 33)	156	0	(United States Soccer Federation) Kansas City
12	GK	Rylee Foster	August 13, 1998 (aged 22)	0	0	(The Football Association) Liverpool
13	MF	Sophie Schmidt	June 28, 1988 (aged 32)	199	19	(United States Soccer Federation) Houston Dash
14	DF	Gabrielle Carle	October 12, 1998 (aged 22)	20	1	(United States Soccer Federation) Florida State Seminoles
15	FW	Nichelle Prince	February 19, 1995 (aged 25)	59	11	(United States Soccer Federation) Houston Dash
16	FW	Janine Beckie	August 20, 1994 (aged 26)	70	31	(The Football Association) Manchester City
17	MF	Jessie Fleming	March 11, 1998 (aged 22)	77	10	(The Football Association) Chelsea
18	GK	Kailen Sheridan	July 16, 1995 (aged 25)	9	0	(United States Soccer Federation) Sky Blue
19	FW	Adriana Leon	October 2, 1992 (aged 28)	66	19	(The Football Association) West Ham United
20	DF	Jayde Riviere	January 22, 2001 (aged 20)	15	1	(United States Soccer Federation) Michigan Wolverines
21	MF	Jordyn Listro	August 10, 1995 (aged 25)	0	0	(United States Soccer Federation) Orlando Pride
22	DF	Lindsay Agnew	March 31, 1995 (aged 25)	14	0	(Swedish Football Association) Örebro
23	DF	Vanessa Gilles	March 11, 1996 (aged 24)	2	0	(French Football Federation) Bordeaux

=== United States ===
Coach: (North Macedonia) Vlatko Andonovski

The final squad was announced on 1 February 2021. On 8 February 2021, Casey Krueger replaced Alana Cook, due to Paris Saint-Germain denying Cook's release. On 13 February 2021, Jaelin Howell replaced Sam Mewis, due to an ankle injury.

No.	Pos.	Player	Date of birth (age)	Caps	Goals	Club
1	GK	Alyssa Naeher	April 20, 1988 (aged 32)	65	0	(United States Soccer Federation) Chicago Red Stars
2	DF	Casey Krueger	August 23, 1990 (aged 30)	32	0	(United States Soccer Federation) Chicago Red Stars
3	MF	Jaelin Howell	November 21, 1999 (aged 21)	1	0	(United States Soccer Federation) Florida State Seminoles
4	DF	Becky Sauerbrunn (captain)	June 6, 1985 (aged 35)	179	0	(United States Soccer Federation) Portland Thorns
5	DF	Kelley O'Hara	August 4, 1988 (aged 32)	133	2	(United States Soccer Federation) Washington Spirit
6	FW	Lynn Williams	May 21, 1993 (aged 27)	31	10	(United States Soccer Federation) North Carolina Courage
7	DF	Abby Dahlkemper	May 13, 1993 (aged 27)	63	0	(The Football Association) Manchester City
8	MF	Julie Ertz	April 6, 1992 (aged 28)	105	20	(United States Soccer Federation) Chicago Red Stars
9	MF	Lindsey Horan	May 26, 1994 (aged 26)	88	20	(United States Soccer Federation) Portland Thorns
10	FW	Carli Lloyd	July 16, 1982 (aged 38)	296	123	(United States Soccer Federation) Sky Blue
11	MF	Catarina Macario	October 4, 1999 (aged 21)	2	1	(French Football Federation) Lyon
12	DF	Tierna Davidson	September 19, 1998 (aged 22)	27	1	(United States Soccer Federation) Chicago Red Stars
13	FW	Alex Morgan	July 2, 1989 (aged 31)	170	107	(United States Soccer Federation) Orlando Pride
14	DF	Emily Sonnett	November 25, 1993 (aged 27)	48	0	(United States Soccer Federation) Washington Spirit
15	FW	Megan Rapinoe	July 5, 1985 (aged 35)	170	54	(United States Soccer Federation) OL Reign
16	MF	Rose Lavelle	May 14, 1995 (aged 25)	48	13	(The Football Association) Manchester City
17	FW	Sophia Smith	August 10, 2000 (aged 20)	1	0	(United States Soccer Federation) Portland Thorns
18	GK	Jane Campbell	February 17, 1995 (aged 26)	4	0	(United States Soccer Federation) Houston Dash
19	DF	Crystal Dunn	July 3, 1992 (aged 28)	107	24	(United States Soccer Federation) Portland Thorns
20	DF	Margaret Purce	September 18, 1995 (aged 25)	4	1	(United States Soccer Federation) Sky Blue
21	GK	Casey Murphy	April 25, 1996 (aged 24)	0	0	(United States Soccer Federation) North Carolina Courage
22	MF	Kristie Mewis	February 25, 1991 (aged 29)	18	3	(United States Soccer Federation) Houston Dash
23	FW	Christen Press	December 29, 1988 (aged 32)	139	58	(The Football Association) Manchester United

== Player representation ==
=== By club ===
Clubs with 3 or more players represented are listed.

Players	Club
7	(Argentina) Boca Juniors
5	(Brazil) Palmeiras, (United States) Houston Dash
4	(United States) Chicago Red Stars, (United States) Portland Thorns
3	(Argentina) UAI Urquiza, (Brazil) Corinthians, (England) Manchester City, (Spain) Madrid CFF, (United States) North Carolina Courage, (United States) Orlando Pride, (United States) Sky Blue

=== By club nationality ===
Players	Clubs
36	United States
12	Spain
11	Argentina, Brazil
9	England
3	China, France, Italy
2	Sweden
1	Canada, Colombia, Portugal

=== By club federation ===
Players	Federation
37	CONCACAF
30	UEFA
23	CONMEBOL
3	AFC

=== By representatives of domestic league ===
National squad	Players
United States	19
Argentina	11
Brazil	10
Canada	1
