= Ghigo =

Ghigo is a surname. Notable people with the surname include:

- Cecilia Ghigo (born 1995), Argentine footballer
- Enzo Ghigo (born 1953), Italian politician
