= Brusca =

Brusca is an Italian surname. Notable people with the surname include:

- Carmen Brusca (born 1985), Argentine futsal player and footballer
- Giovanni Brusca (born 1957), Sicilian Mafiosi
