= Boca Juniors (women) =

Boca Juniors Women
- Full name: Club Atlético Boca Juniors
- Nickname: Gladiadoras
- Founded: 1990; 36 years ago
- Ground: Pedro Pompilio Complex, Buenos Aires, Argentina
- Chairman: Juan Román Riquelme
- Manager: Florencia Quiñones
- League: Campeonato Femenino
- 2025 Clausura: Semifinals
- Website: bocajuniors.com.ar/femenino
| Home colours | Away colours | Third colours |

Boca Juniors Femenino is the women's football team of Argentine sports club Boca Juniors. Established in 1990, it has been the leading force in the Campeonato de Fútbol Femenino since the late 1990s, having won 28 editions of the competition, including a ten-years streak winning both the Apertura and Clausura championships. Former men's squad player Juan Román Riquelme is in charge of the section since the beginning of 2020.

Boca Juniors has made eight appearances in the Copa Libertadores Femenina from 2010 to 2023, reaching 3rd place in 2010 and in 2022 Boca became the first Argentine team to reach the final of the competition, finishing in second place.

During 2015 Boca Juniors played the inaugural Supercopa Argentina de Fútbol Femenino and on the final defeated San Lorenzo 2–1 to become the 1st Supercopa Argentina champions.

== History ==
The women's football section of Boca Juniors was created in 1990. One year later, with the establishment of a league, Boca Juniors began to participate in official competitions. In the first edition, Boca finished 2nd to champion River Plate. The first Primera División title was won in 1992.

The team did not win another title until 1998, but this started a successful era that reached its peak from 2003 to 2008 where Boca Juniors won a record-10 consecutive championships, becoming a leading force of the competition. In 2010, Boca Juniors played their first Copa Libertadores Femenina ever, where the team finished 3rd. (of 10), having reached the semifinal where the squad was beat by Brazilian Santos. Andrea Ojeda was the topscorer of the team with 5 goals.

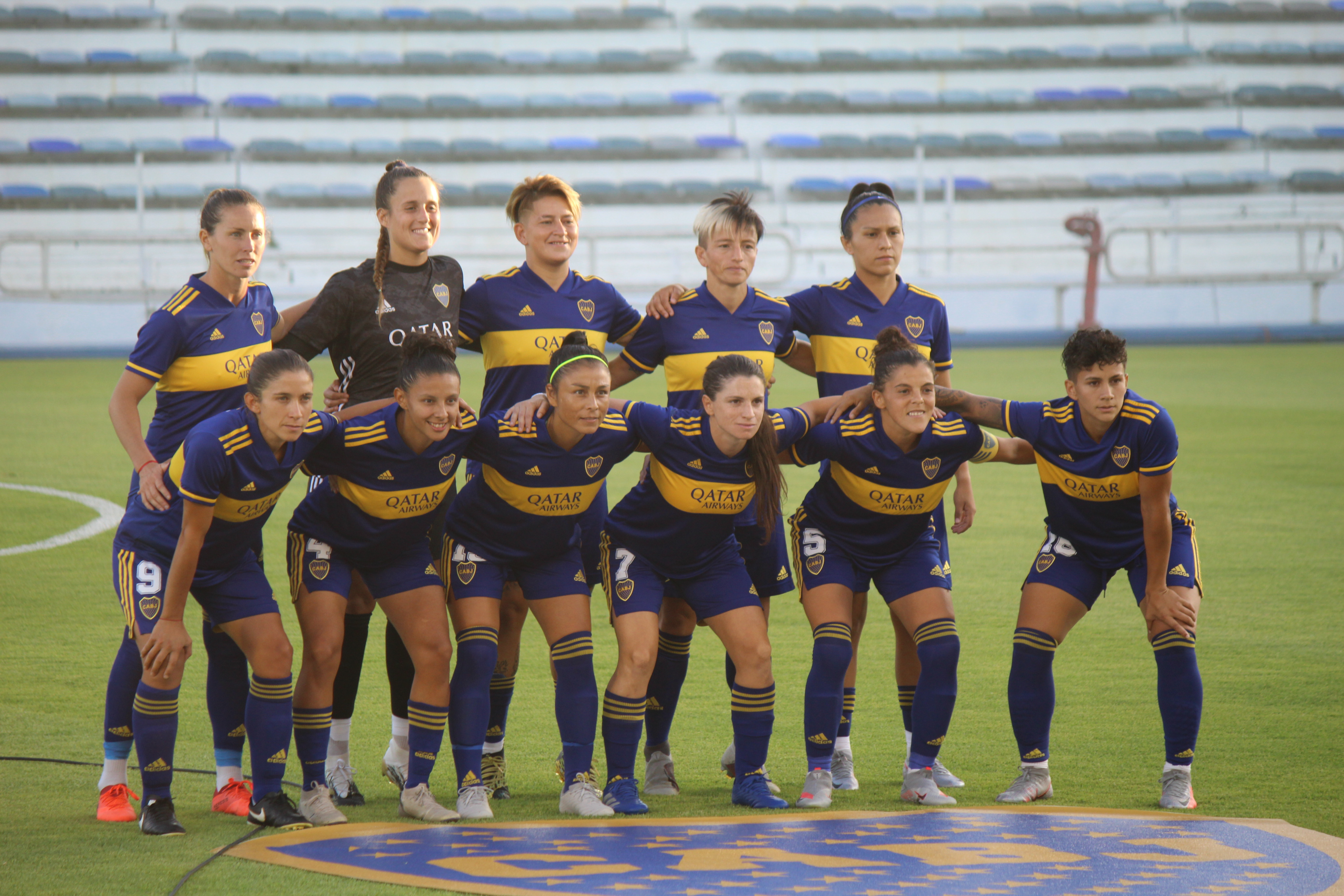
Boca Juniors starting line-up that won the first professional era title (24 title overall), in a final against River Plate.

When women's football became professional in Argentina in 2019, 21 Boca Juniors players signed their first contracts in August. Another landmark in Boca Juniors women's was on 19 March 2019, when the team played a match at La Bombonera for the first time, following a club's initiative to commemorate the International Women's Day. The match was held in the round 5th of the 2019 championship, with Boca easily defeating Lanús 5–0. The historic first goal was scored by Yamila Rodríguez.

On 19 January 2021, Boca won their 24th. Primera División title (and the first in professional era) after easily beating arch-rival River Plate 7–0. Coached by Christian Meloni, the starting line-up was: Laurina Oliveros; Julieta Cruz, Florencia Quiñones, Noelia Espíndola, Eliana Stábile; Lorena Benítez, Clarisa Huber, Fabiana Vallejos; Carolina Troncoso, Andrea Ojeda, Yamila Rodríguez. The goals were scored by Huber, Rodríguez, Benítez, Vallejos (2), Ojeda (2).

In 2022, Boca reached the final of the Copa Libertadores Femenina, but were defeated 4–1 by Palmeiras.

=== Rivalries ===
Boca, like their men's team, also has a rivalry with River Plate and their matches are known as the Superclásico femenino del fútbol Argentino. Since 1991 the Superclásico has been played a total of 70 times, with Boca winning 41, River 14 and 15 draws.

== Players ==
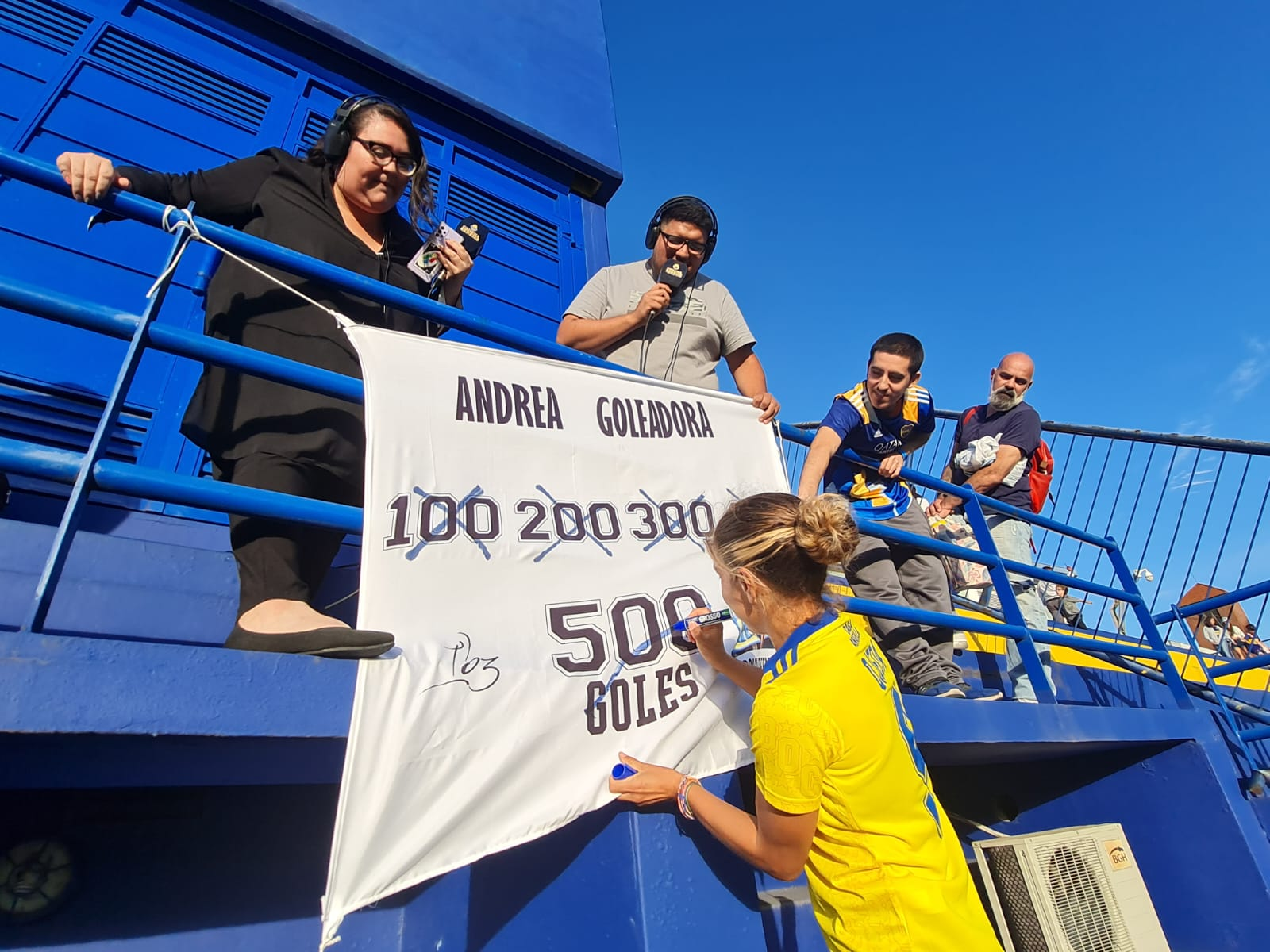
Andrea Ojeda, Boca Juniors top goal scorer with over 500 goals.

=== Current squad ===
As of 20 February 2026

Note: Flags indicate national team as defined under FIFA eligibility rules; some limited exceptions apply. Players may hold more than one non-FIFA nationality.

| No. | Pos. | Nation | Player |
|---|---|---|---|
| 1 | GK | ARG | Laurina Oliveros (captain) |
| 2 | DF | ARG | Maylen Guerra |
| 3 | DF | ARG | Luzmila Ramírez |
| 4 | DF | ARG | Julieta Cruz |
| 5 | MF | ARG | Valentina Tesio |
| 6 | DF | ARG | Valentina Ahumada |
| 7 | FW | ARG | Carolina Troncoso |
| 8 | FW | ARG | Agustina Arias |
| 9 | FW | ARG | Andrea Ojeda |
| 10 | MF | ARG | Camila Gómez Ares |
| 11 | FW | ARG | Kishi Núñez |
| 12 | GK | ARG | Sabrina Artin |
| 13 | MF | COL | Ana María Ramírez |
| 14 | FW | ARG | Brisa Priori |
| 15 | DF | URU | Camila Baccaro |
| 16 | MF | ARG | Eugenia Flores |
| 17 | MF | ARG | Lola Ruffini |
| 18 | FW | ARG | Brisa Campos |

| No. | Pos. | Nation | Player |
|---|---|---|---|
| 19 | DF | ARG | Yohana Masagli |
| 20 | FW | ARG | Celeste Dos Santos |
| 21 | MF | ARG | Julieta Martínez |
| 22 | GK | ARG | Joaquina Rodríguez Palma |
| 23 | MF | ARG | Delfina Silvestri |
| 24 | DF | ARG | Belén Pokoracki |
| 25 | MF | ARG | Mía Pavón |
| 26 | FW | ARG | Alma Benedetti |
| 27 | MF | ARG | Violeta Álvarez |
| 28 | FW | ARG | Yazmín Benítez |
| 29 | MF | JPN | Yuria Sasaki |
| 30 | FW | ARG | Verónica Acuña |
| 31 | MF | ARG | Bianca Recanati |
| 32 | FW | ARG | Erica Lonigro |
| 33 | DF | URU | Araceli Pereyra |
| 34 | DF | ARG | Milagros Fernández |
| 35 | MF | ARG | Morena Calvo |

2025 Copa Libertadores Squad

Note: Flags indicate national team as defined under FIFA eligibility rules; some limited exceptions apply. Players may hold more than one non-FIFA nationality.

| No. | Pos. | Nation | Player |
|---|---|---|---|
| 1 | GK | ARG | Laurina Oliveros |
| 2 | DF | ARG | Maylen Guerra |
| 4 | DF | ARG | Julieta Cruz |
| 5 | FW | USA | Emily Ormson |
| 6 | DF | ARG | Eliana Stábile |
| 7 | FW | ARG | Carolina Troncoso |
| 8 | FW | ARG | Agustina Arias |
| 9 | FW | ARG | Andrea Ojeda |
| 10 | MF | ARG | Camila Gómez Ares |
| 11 | FW | ARG | Kishi Núñez |
| 14 | FW | ARG | Brisa Priori |
| 15 | DF | URU | Camila Baccaro |

| No. | Pos. | Nation | Player |
|---|---|---|---|
| 16 | MF | ARG | Eugenia Flores |
| 17 | MF | ARG | Lola Ruffini |
| 18 | FW | ARG | Brisa Campos |
| 19 | DF | ARG | Yohana Masagli |
| 21 | MF | ARG | Julieta Martínez |
| 22 | GK | ARG | Joaquina Rodríguez Palma |
| 24 | DF | ARG | Belén Pokoracki |
| 26 | MF | ARG | Lorena Benítez |
| 29 | MF | JPN | Yuria Sasaki |
| 32 | FW | USA | Sarah Mirr |
| 33 | DF | URU | Araceli Pereyra |

=== Reserves ===
As of 25 August 2024

Note: Flags indicate national team as defined under FIFA eligibility rules; some limited exceptions apply. Players may hold more than one non-FIFA nationality.

| No. | Pos. | Nation | Player |
|---|---|---|---|
| 1 | GK | ARG | Victoria Anahí Quiroga |
| 2 | DF | ARG | Aneley Guttlein (captain) |
| 3 | DF | ARG | Luzmila Giménez |
| 4 | DF | ARG | Ludmila Figueroa |
| 5 | MF | ARG | Ludmila Pérez Gómez |
| 7 | FW | ARG | Martina Iraola |
| 9 | FW | ARG | Johana Benítez |
| 10 | MF | ARG | Morena Rozales |
| 11 | FW | ARG | Mía Pavón |
| 12 | GK | ARG | Valentina Torres |
| 13 | DF | ARG | Ludmila Silva |

| No. | Pos. | Nation | Player |
|---|---|---|---|
| 14 | FW | ARG | Alma Benedetti |
| 16 | MF | ARG | Sofía Cóceres |
| 17 | MF | ARG | Abril Mereles |
| 18 | DF | ARG | Anyelen Ferreira |
| 19 | MF | ARG | Pamela Gómez |
| 20 | MF | ARG | Martina Schmidt |
| 21 | FW | ARG | Luana Fernandez |
| 22 | DF | ARG | Bianca Acosta |
| 23 | DF | ARG | Daniela Fernández |
| 24 | FW | ARG | Guadalupe Maggiora |
| 30 | MF | ARG | Tiara Paz |

=== Notable players ===
==== FIFA World Cup participants ====
List of players that were called up for a FIFA Women's World Cup while playing for Boca Juniors. In brackets, the tournament played:

- (Argentina) Karina Alvariza (2003)
- (Argentina) Nancy Díaz (2003)
- (Argentina) Yanina Gaitán (2003)
- (Argentina) Marisa Gerez (2003)
- (Argentina) Rosana Gómez (2003, 2007)
- (Argentina) Mariela Ricotti (2003)
- (Argentina) Elizabeth Villanueva (2003)
- (Argentina) Celeste Barbitta (2007)
- (Argentina) Carmen Brusca (2007)
- (Argentina) Valeria Cotelo (2007)
- (Argentina) Romina Ferro (2007)
- (Argentina) Natalia Gatti (2007)
- (Argentina) Eva González (2007)
- (Argentina) Clarisa Huber (2007)
- (Argentina) Andrea Ojeda (2007)
- (Argentina) Fabiana Vallejos (2007)
- (Argentina) Lorena Benítez (2019)
- (Argentina) Eliana Stábile (2019)
- (Argentina) Julieta Cruz (2023)
- (Argentina) Miriam Mayorga (2023)

== Coaches ==
=== Current coaching staff ===
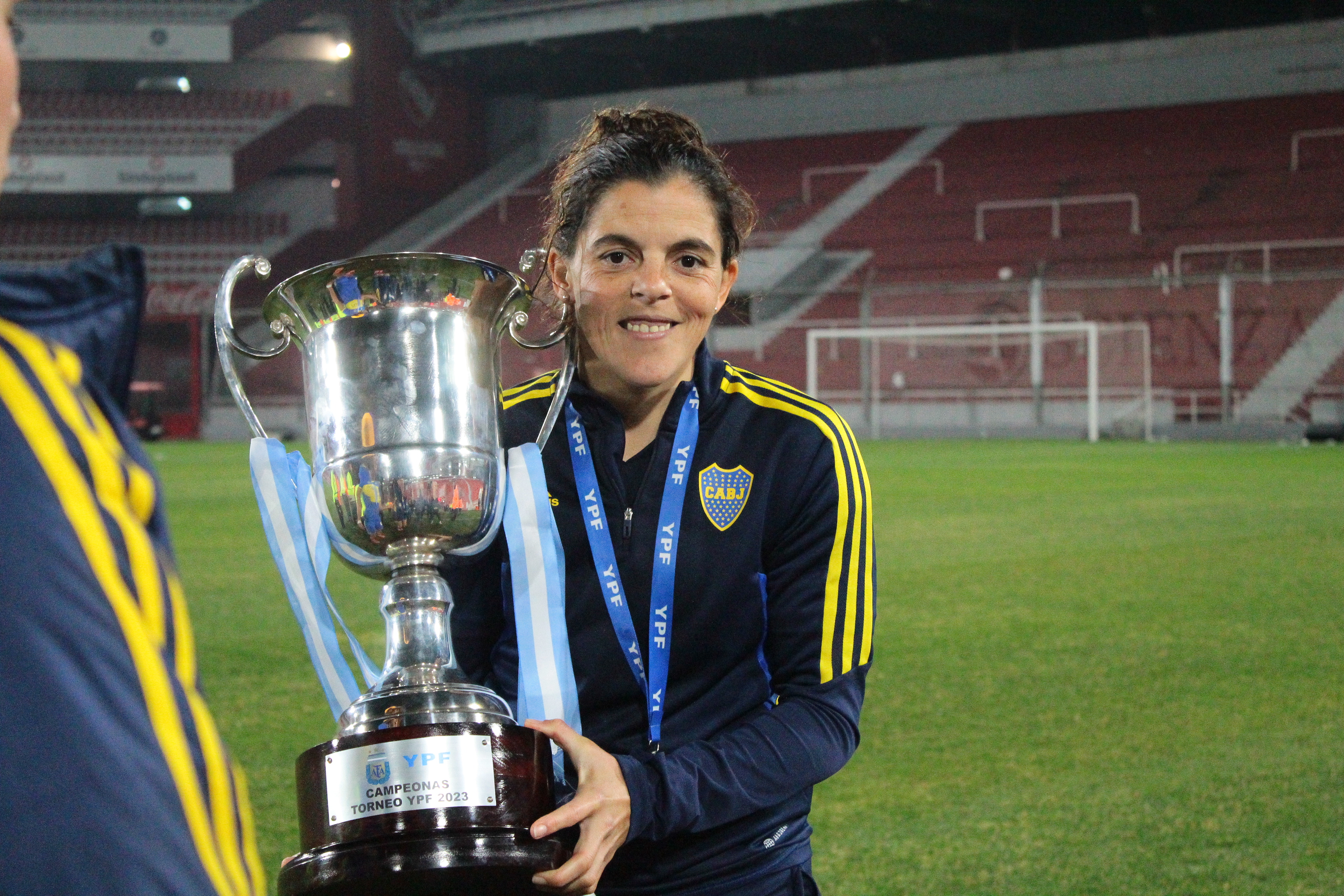
Current head coach Florencia Quiñones in 2023 winning her first title as a manager with Boca Juniors, having previously won three as a player with Boca.

| Position | Staff |
|---|---|
| Head coach | (Argentina) Florencia Quiñones |
| Assistant coach | (Argentina) Ludmila Manicler |
| Assistant coach | (Argentina) Pablo Jerez |
| Goalkeeping coach | (Argentina) Maximiliano Scapparoni |
| Fitness coach | (Argentina) Alejandro Kunic |
| Team doctor | (Argentina) José Barbier |
| Kinesiologist | (Argentina) Nancy Cieplak |
| Kinesiologist | (Argentina) Carlos Archero |

Last updated: 22 July 2023
Source: Boca Juniors Fútbol Femenino

=== Manager history ===
As of 30 March 2024.

- (Argentina) Maria Ines Cisneros (1991)
- (Argentina) Eduardo Saturnini (1992)
- (Argentina) Rubén Suñé (1993–94)
- (Argentina) José Borello (1995)
- (Argentina) Miguel Ángel Bordón (1996)
- (Argentina) Raul Rodriguez Seoane (1997–2001)
- (Argentina) Carlos Stigliano (2002)
- (Argentina) Gerardo (Toti) Ríos (2002–05)
- (Argentina) Daniel Distefano (2006–10)
- (Argentina) Marcela Lesich (2010–15)
- (Argentina) Christian Meloni (2016–21)
- (Argentina) Esteban Pizzi (2021)
- (Argentina) Jorge Martínez (2022)
- (Argentina) Florencia Quiñones (2023–)

=== Winning managers ===
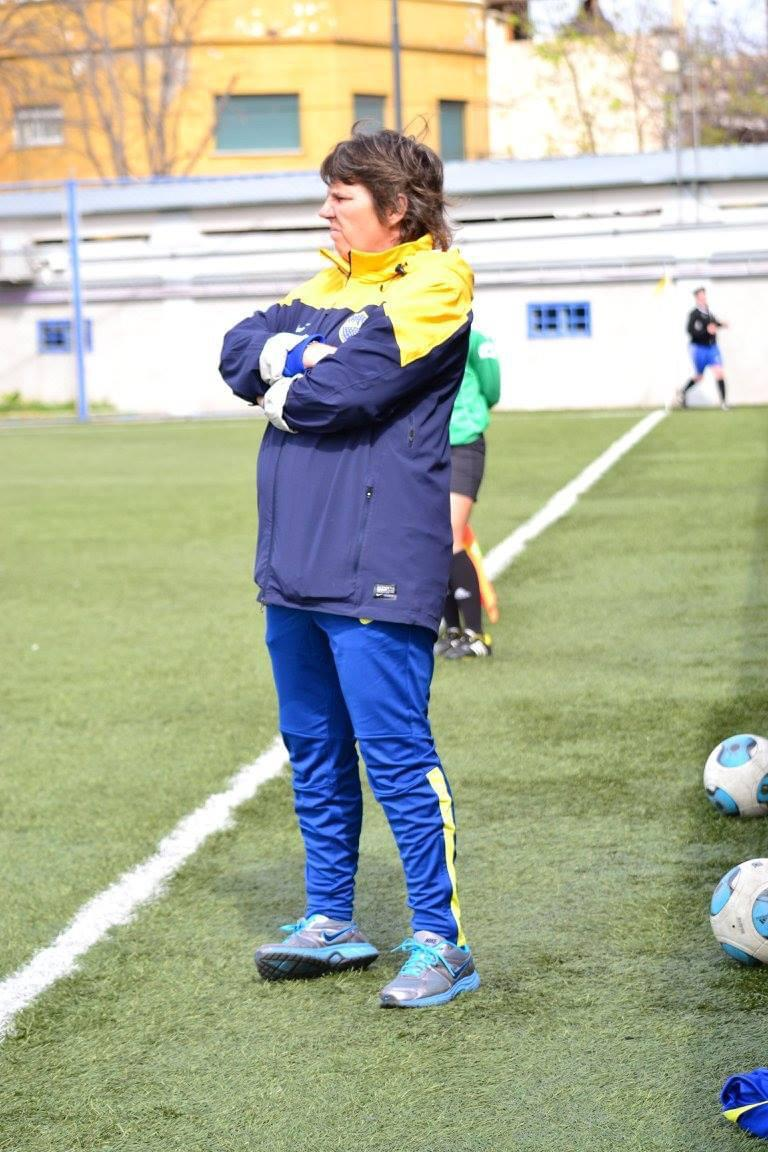
Marcela Lesich, Boca Juniors winningest coach with 7 titles, Lesich also won another 8 titles with the club as a player.

| Name | Titles | Details |
|---|---|---|
| Marcela Lesich | 7 | 2010 Apertura, 2011 Clausura, 2011 Apertura, 2012 Apertura, 2013 Clausura, 2013 Inicial, 2015 Supercopa Argentina |
| Daniel Distefano | 6 | 2006 Clausura, 2006 Apertura, 2007 Clausura, 2007 Apertura, 2008 Clausura, 2009 Apertura |
| Toti Rios | 5 | 2003 Apertura, 2004 Clausura, 2004 Apertura, 2005 Clausura, 2005 Apertura |
| Raul Rodriguez Seoane | 4 | 1998, 1999, 2000, 2001 Apertura |
| Florencia Quiñones | 4 | 2023, 2023 Copa de la Liga, 2023 Copa Federal, 2024 Apertura |
| Esteban Pizzi | 2 | 2021 Clausura, 2021 Súper Final |
| Eduardo Saturnini | 1 | 1992 |
| Carlos Stigliano | 1 | 2002 Clausura |
| Christian Meloni | 1 | 2020 |
| Jorge Martínez | 1 | 2022 |

== Competitive record ==
=== Copa Libertadores ===
Champions Runners-up Third place Fourth place Tournament played fully or partially on home soil

Copa Libertadores record
| Year | Round | Position | Pld | W | D* | L | GF | GA |
|---|---|---|---|---|---|---|---|---|
| (Brazil) 2009 | Did not qualify | | | | | | | |
| (Brazil) 2010 | Third place match | 3rd | 6 | 3 | 2 | 1 | 21 | 8 |
| (Brazil) 2011 | Group stage | 8th | 3 | 1 | 0 | 2 | 6 | 6 |
| (Brazil) 2012 | Group stage | 5th | 3 | 2 | 1 | 0 | 7 | 4 |
| (Brazil) 2013 | Group stage | 7th | 3 | 1 | 0 | 2 | 5 | 6 |
| (Brazil) 2014 | Group stage | 5th | 3 | 2 | 0 | 1 | 7 | 7 |
| (Colombia) 2015 | Did not qualify | | | | | | | |
| (Uruguay) 2016 | Did not qualify | | | | | | | |
| (Paraguay) 2017 | Did not qualify | | | | | | | |
| (Brazil) 2018 | Did not qualify | | | | | | | |
| (Ecuador) 2019 | Did not qualify | | | | | | | |
| (Argentina) 2020 | Quarter-finals | 5th | 4 | 2 | 1 | 1 | 13 | 4 |
| (Paraguay) 2021 | Did not qualify | | | | | | | |
| (Ecuador) 2022 | Final | 2nd | 6 | 3 | 2 | 1 | 12 | 10 |
| (Colombia) 2023 | Group stage | 10th | 3 | 1 | 1 | 1 | 6 | 7 |
| (Paraguay) 2024 | Third place match | 3rd | 6 | 2 | 2 | 1 | 6 | 2 |
| (Argentina) 2025 | Quarter-finals | 7th | 4 | 1 | 2 | 1 | 2 | 4 |
| Total | Runners-up | 10/17 | 41 | 19 | 11 | 11 | 85 | 58 |

Legend

Win Draw Loss

Copa Libertadores matches
| Season | Round | Opponent | Result | Scorers | Position |
|---|---|---|---|---|---|
| 2010 | Group B | (Bolivia) Florida | 4–1 | Gatti 2, Brusca, Gómez | 2 / 5 |
| 2010 | Group B | (Peru) Universidad Iquitos | 12–1 | Ojeda 4, Gatti 2, Huber 2, Barbitta, Gerez, Gómez, Santana | 2 / 5 |
| 2010 | Group B | (Paraguay) Universidad Asunción | 2–2 | Brusca, Ojeda | 2 / 5 |
| 2010 | Group B | (Chile) Everton | 1–1 | Gerez | 2 / 5 |
| 2010 | Semifinals | (Brazil) Santos | 0–2 | | SF |
| 2010 | Third place match | (Ecuador) Deportivo Quito | 2–1 | Cotelo, González | 3rd place |
| 2011 | Group C | (Colombia) Formas Íntimas | 2–3 | Potassa, Santana | 3 / 4 |
| 2011 | Group C | (Brazil) São José | 0–1 | | 3 / 4 |
| 2011 | Group C | (Ecuador) Liga Quito | 4–2 | Ojeda 2, Brusca, Potassa | 3 / 4 |
| 2012 | Group B | (Venezuela) Caracas | 2–1 | Manicler, Ojeda | 2 / 4 |
| 2012 | Group B | (Uruguay) Nacional | 4–2 | Gómez, Jaimes, Manicler, Oviedo | 2 / 4 |
| 2012 | Group B | (Brazil) São José | 1–1 | González | 2 / 4 |
| 2013 | Group C | (Brazil) Foz Cataratas | 3–1 | Brusca, Oviedo, Potassa | 3 / 4 |
| 2013 | Group C | (Venezuela) Estudiantes de Guárico | 1–2 | Potassa | 3 / 4 |
| 2013 | Group C | (Colombia) Formas Íntimas | 1–3 | Ospina (o.g.) | 3 / 4 |
| 2014 | Group A | (Bolivia) Mundo Futuro | 2–1 | Ojeda, Oviedo | 2 / 4 |
| 2014 | Group A | (Brazil) São José | 1–5 | Kippes | 2 / 4 |
| 2014 | Group A | (Peru) Real Maracaná | 4–1 | Oviedo 2, Stábile 2 | 2 / 4 |
| 2020 | Group B | (Chile) Santiago Morning | 1–1 | Quiñones | 1 / 4 |
| 2020 | Group B | (Bolivia) Deportivo Trópico | 10–1 | Rodríguez 3, Vallejos 3, Huber, Ojeda, Palomar, Troncoso | 1 / 4 |
| 2020 | Group B | (Brazil) Kindermann/Avaí | 1–0 | Rodríguez | 1 / 4 |
| 2020 | Quarter-finals | (Colombia) América | 1–2 | Palomar | QF |
| 2022 | Group B | (Uruguay) Defensor Sporting | 2–0 | Gómez Ares, Ojeda | 1 / 4 |
| 2022 | Group B | (Ecuador) Ñañas | 4–2 | Gómez Ares 2, Córdoba (o.g.), Rodríguez | 1 / 4 |
| 2022 | Group B | (Brazil) Ferroviária | 2–2 | Rodríguez 2 | 1 / 4 |
| 2022 | Quarter-finals | (Brazil) Corinthians | 2–1 | Núñez, Palomar | QF |
| 2022 | Semifinals | (Colombia) Deportivo Cali | 1–1 (3–0 p) | Palomar, Espíndola (pen.), Palomar (pen.), Sachs (pen.) | SF |
| 2022 | Final | (Brazil) Palmeiras | 1–4 | Priori | 2nd place |
| 2023 | Group D | (Colombia) América | 1–1 | Priori | 3 / 4 |
| 2023 | Group D | (Uruguay) Nacional | 5–1 | Gómez Ares 2, Núñez (pen.), Polich, Troncoso | 3 / 4 |
| 2023 | Group D | (Brazil) Internacional | 0–5 | | 3 / 4 |
| 2024 | Group A | (Brazil) Corinthians | 0–0 | | 2 / 4 |
| 2024 | Group A | (Paraguay) Libertad | 1–0 | Palomar | 2 / 4 |
| 2024 | Group A | (Venezuela) ADIFFEM | 3–1 | Arias 2, Núñez | 2 / 4 |
| 2024 | Quarter-finals | (Brazil) Santos | 0–0 (4–2 p) | Sasaki (pen.), Flores (pen.), Núñez (pen.), Cruz (pen.) | QF |
| 2024 | Semifinals | (Brazil) Corinthians | 0–1 | | SF |
| 2024 | Third place match | (Ecuador) Dragonas IDV | 2–0 | Núñez, Preininger | 3rd place |
| 2025 | Group B | (Peru) Alianza Lima | 0–0 | | 2 / 4 |
| 2025 | Group B | (Venezuela) ADIFFEM | 2–0 | Ruffini, Troncoso | 2 / 4 |
| 2025 | Group B | (Brazil) Ferroviária | 0–0 | | 2 / 4 |
| 2025 | Quarter-finals | (Brazil) Corinthians | 0–4 | | QF |

== Honours ==
=== Titles ===
| Type | Competition | Titles | Winning years |
|---|---|---|---|
| National (League) | Primera División A | 28 | 1992, 1998, 1999, 2000, 2001 Apertura, 2002 Clausura, 2003 Apertura, 2004 Clausura, 2004 Apertura, 2005 Clausura, 2005 Apertura, 2006 Clausura, 2006 Apertura, 2007 Clausura, 2007 Apertura, 2008 Clausura, 2009 Apertura, 2010 Apertura, 2011 Clausura, 2011 Apertura, 2012 Apertura, 2013 Clausura, 2013 Inicial, 2020, 2021 Clausura, 2022, 2023, 2024 Apertura |
| National (Cups) | Supercopa Argentina | 1 | 2015 |
| National (Cups) | Súper Final | 1 | 2021 |
| National (Cups) | Copa de la Liga | 1 | 2023 |
| National (Cups) | Copa Federal | 1^{(s)} | 2023 |

Keys

- Record
- ^{(s)} Shared record
