= Yarella Torres =

Chilean footballer (born 1992)

Personal information
- Full name: Yarella Daniela Torres Cisternas
- Date of birth: 7 January 1992 (age 34)
- Positions: Defender; left midfielder

Team information
- Current team: Vial

Senior career*
Years	Team	Apps	(Gls)
–2012	Everton		
2013–2018	Santiago Wanderers		
2019–2020	Palestino		
2020–	Vial		

International career^{‡}
2019–	Chile	1	(0)
- * Club domestic league appearances and goals ‡ National team caps and goals as of 8 October 2019

Yarella Daniela Torres Cisternas (born 7 January 1992) is a Chilean footballer who plays as a defender for CD Arturo Fernández Vial and the Chile women's national team.

== Club career ==
Torres played the 2010 Copa Libertadores Femenina for Everton de Viña del Mar. She remained with the club until 2012. From 2013 to 2018, she played for Santiago Wanderers. In 2019, she joined CD Palestino.

On 9 September 2020, Torres signed with CD Arturo Fernández Vial.

== International career ==
Torres made her senior debut for Chile on 8 October 2019.
