= Sarah Mirr =

American soccer player (born 2000)

Personal information
- Full name: Sarah Alexandra Mirr
- Date of birth: September 29, 2000 (age 26)
- Place of birth: Pleasanton, California, U.S.
- Height: 5 ft 3 in (1.60 m)
- Position: Midfielder

Team information
- Current team: Boca Juniors
- Number: 32

Youth career
- 2014–2017: Foothill Varsity Soccer
- 2014–2018: Pleasanton Rage

College career
| Years | Team | Apps | (Gls) |
| 2018–2022 | Loyola Greyhounds | 72 | (5) |

Senior career*
| Years | Team | Apps | (Gls) |
| 2022–2023 | Pleasanton Rage | | |
| 2024 | Ataşehir Belediyespor | 9 | (1) |
| 2024 | Sundsvalls DFF | 9 | (2) |
| 2025– | Boca Juniors | | |

International career
- United States Futsal
- * Club domestic league appearances and goals as of November 10, 2024

Sarah Alexandra Mirr (born September 29, 2000) is an American professional soccer player who plays as a midfielder for Campeonato de Fútbol Femenino club Boca Juniors. She was called up to the United States national futsal team.

== Early years ==
Mirr is 5 ft 3 in (1.60 m) tall, and plays as a midfielder.

In the time from 2014 to 2017, she captained her high school team Foothill Varsity Soccer. In August 2018, she was honored with the weekly High School Athletic Award by the regional channel TV30.

Between 2014 and 2018, she played for the local youth team of Pleasanton Rage in the Bay Area Division of the Elite Clubs National League (ECNL Girls). She captained the team, and led them to the ECNL Champions League. .

She played for her college soccer team Loyola Greyhounds in the Patriot League women's soccer tournament between 2018 and 20022. In September 2022, she was named Midfielder of the Week. Mirr was also named to the Loyola's Fall Academic Honor Roll member, earning Patriot League Academic Honor Roll recognition as a student-athlete for her competing during the 2022 fall semester.

== Club career ==
After graduation from the college, she returned home and played for her former club Pleasanton Rage in the Women's Premier Soccer League (WPSL).

In March 2024, Mirr moved to Turkey and joined the Istanbul-based club Ataşehir Belediyespor for the second half of the 2023-24 Women's Super League. She scored one goal in nine matches.

== International career ==
Mirr was selected to take part at the United States national futsal team's Identification Camp in Walnut Creek, California in May 2024.

== Personal life ==
Sarah Alexandra Mirr was born to James R. Mirr and Daphyne Thomas Mirr in Pleasanton, California. After graduating from the Foothiill High School in her hometown in 2018, she studied at Loyola University Maryland from 2018 to 2022.
