= Julieta Cruz =

Argentine footballer

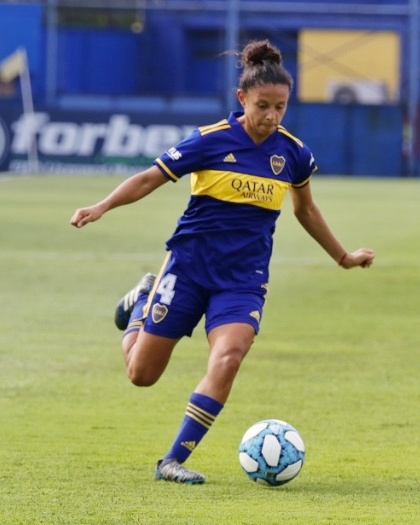

Personal information
- Full name: Julieta Micaela Cruz
- Date of birth: 4 June 1996 (age 30)
- Place of birth: General Alvear, Mendoza, Argentina
- Height: 1.60 m (5 ft 3 in)
- Position: Right-back

Team information
- Current team: Boca Juniors
- Number: 4

Senior career*
Years	Team	Apps	(Gls)
2014	River Plate		
2016–	Boca Juniors		

International career^{‡}
2021–	Argentina	23	(1)
Medal record
Women's football
Representing Argentina
Copa América Femenina
Third place	2022 Colombia
- * Club domestic league appearances and goals ‡ National team caps and goals as of 30 April 2024

Julieta Micaela Cruz (born 4 June 1996) is an Argentine footballer who plays as a right-back for Primera División A club Boca Juniors and the Argentina women's national team.

== Early life ==
Cruz was born in General Alvear in Mendoza Province. She played youth football on boys' teams until the age of 14.

== Club career ==
=== River Plate ===
In 2014, Cruz joined River Plate aged 17. After a game against Porto Nuervo, she was diagnosed with paroxysmal supraventricular tachycardia. River declined to fund treatment and she departed the club.

=== Boca Juniors ===
In 2016, Cruz joined Boca Juniors. In August 2019, Cruz signed her first professional contract with Boca.

== International career ==
On 17 September 2021, Cruz made her debut for the Argentina national team in a 3–1 loss to Brazil at Estádio Governador Ernani Sátyro.

== Career statistics ==
=== International ===
As of match played 3 March 2024

Appearances and goals by national team and year
National team	Year	Apps	Goals
Argentina	2021	3	0
Argentina	2022	6	0
Argentina	2023	10	1
Argentina	2024	4	0
Total		23	1

=== International goals ===
Scores and results list Argentina's goal tally first, score column indicates score after each Cruz goal.

List of international goals scored by Julieta Cruz
No.	Date	Venue	Opponent	Score	Result	Competition
1.	25 October 2023	Estadio Elías Figueroa Brander, Valparaíso, Chile	Bolivia	3–0	3–0	2023 Pan American Games

== Honours ==
Boca Juniors

- Primera División A: 2020, 2021 Clausura, 2022, 2023, 2024 Apertura
- Copa de la Liga: 2023
- Súper Final: 2021
- Copa Federal: 2023
