= Carolina Troncoso =

Argentine footballer (born 1991)

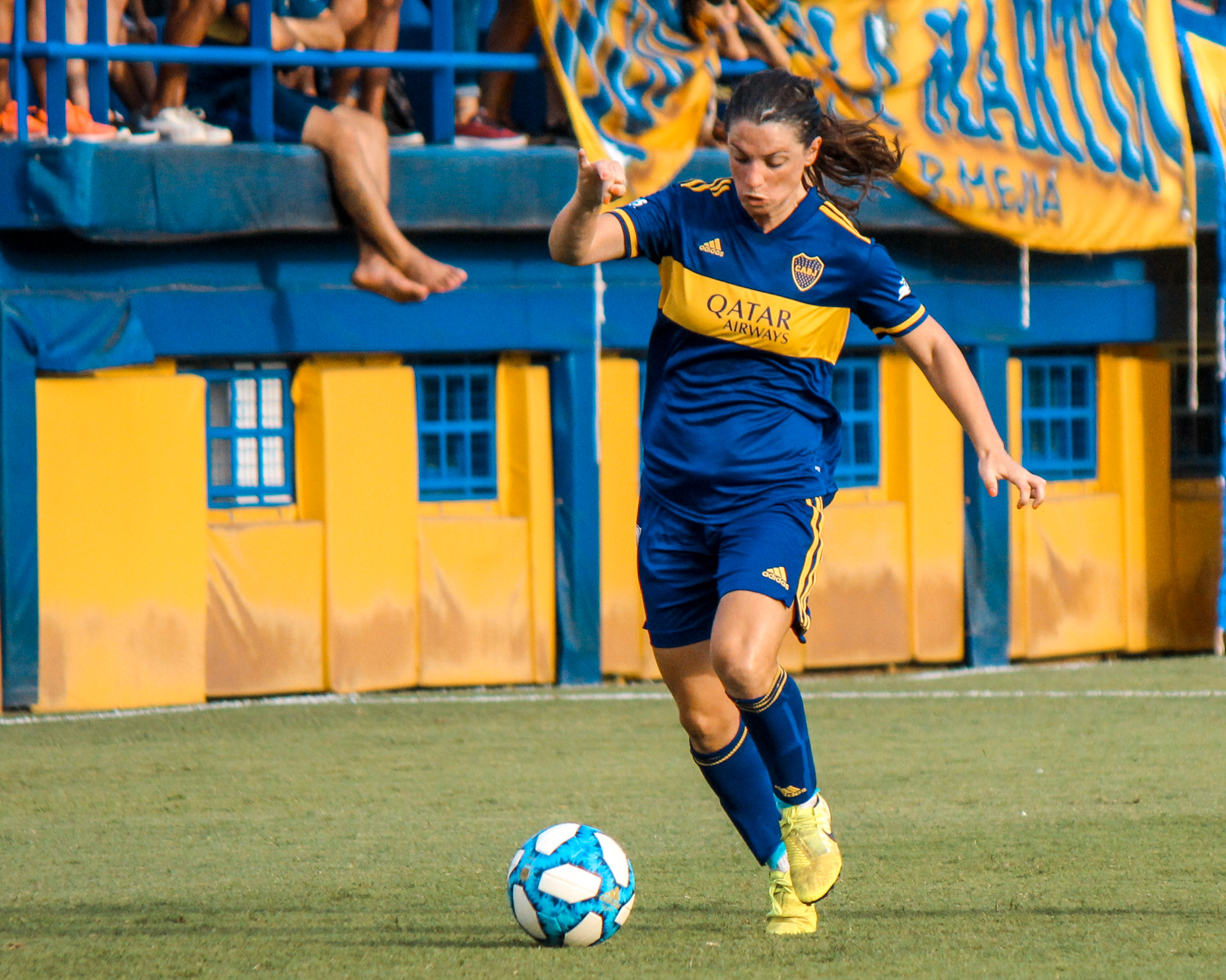

Personal information
- Full name: Carolina Alejandra Troncoso
- Date of birth: 28 January 1991 (age 35)
- Place of birth: Quilmes, Buenos Aires, Argentina
- Height: 1.59 m (5 ft 3 in)
- Position: Forward

Team information
- Current team: ASA Tel Aviv
- Number: 7

Senior career*
Years	Team	Apps	(Gls)
- Boca Juniors
2022	Junior Barranquilla	18	(4)
2022–	ASA Tel Aviv	1	(0)

International career^{‡}
2021–	Argentina	1	(0)
Medal record
Women's football
Representing Argentina
Copa América Femenina
Bronze medal – third place	2025 Ecuador
- * Club domestic league appearances and goals as of 22 September 2022 ‡ National team caps and goals as of 8 April 2021.

Carolina Alejandra Troncoso (born 28 January 1991) is an Argentine footballer who plays as a forward for Israeli Ligat Nashim club ASA Tel Aviv and the Argentina women's national team.

== Club career ==
Troncoso has played for Boca Juniors in Argentina.

== International career ==
Troncoso made her senior debut for Argentina on 8 April 2021 in a 0–0 friendly draw against Venezuela.
