= Celeste Barbitta =

Argentine footballer

Personal information
- Full name: Sabrina Celeste Barbitta Nuño
- Date of birth: 22 May 1979 (age 47)
- Place of birth: Buenos Aires, Argentina
- Height: 1.70 m (5 ft 7 in)
- Position: Defender

Senior career*
Years	Team	Apps	(Gls)
- Boca Juniors
- Racing

International career^{‡}
	Argentina	1	(0)
- * Club domestic league appearances and goals ‡ National team caps and goals as of 10 September 2007 (before the 2007 FIFA Women's World Cup)

Sabrina Celeste Barbitta Nuño (born 22 May 1979), known as Celeste Barbitta, is an Argentine footballer who plays as a defender. She was a member of the Argentina women's national team at two editions of the FIFA Women's World Cup (2003 and 2007).
