= Cecilia Ghigo =

Argentine footballer (born 1995)

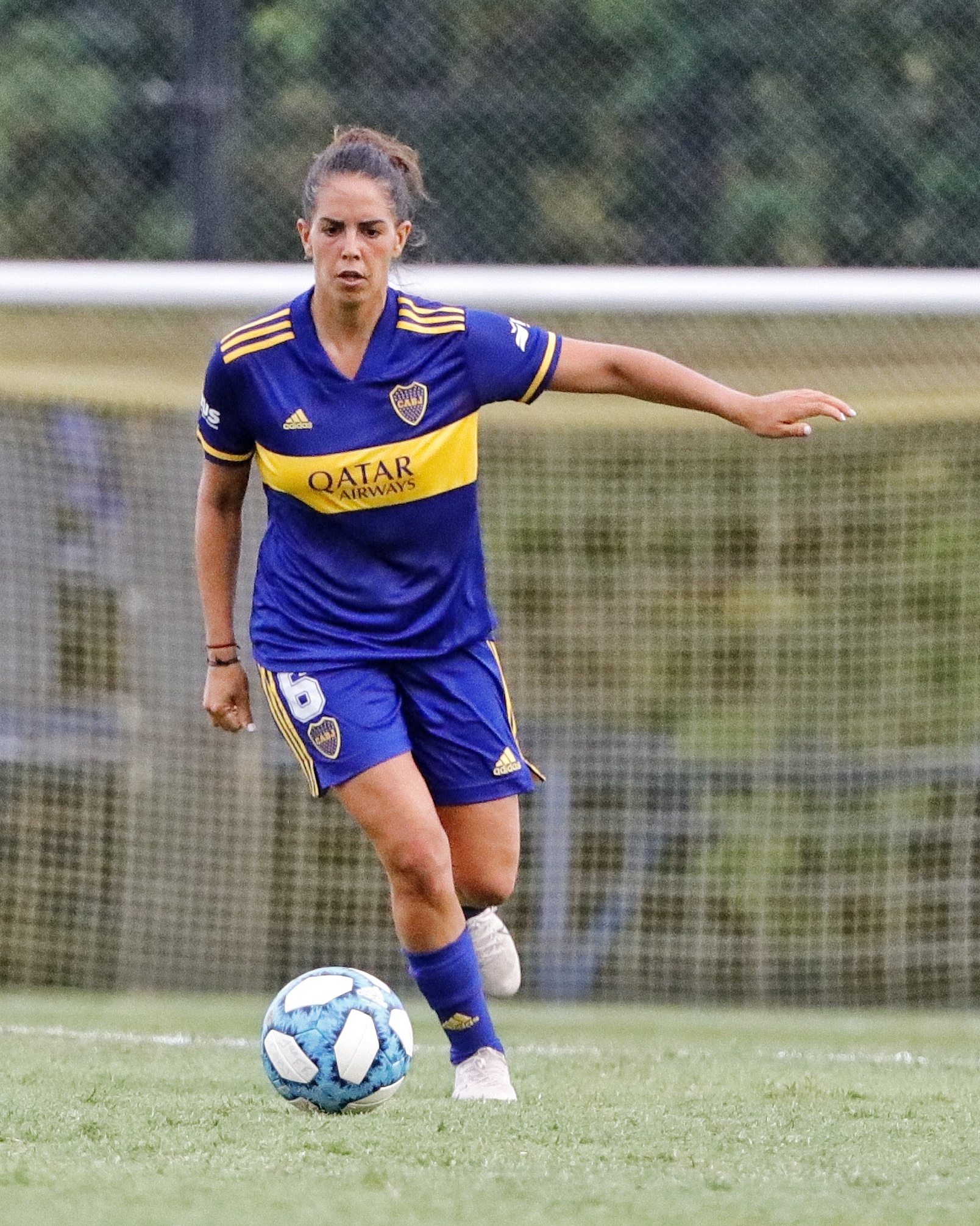
- Cecilia Ghigo, was a female Argentine footballer.

Personal information
- Full name: Cecilia Solange Ghigo
- Date of birth: 16 January 1995 (age 31)
- Place of birth: Lomas del Mirador, Argentina
- Height: 1.57 m (5 ft 2 in)
- Position: Defender

Team information
- Current team: Boca Juniors
- Number: 6

Senior career*
Years	Team	Apps	(Gls)
2013–2015	Boca Juniors		
2015–2016	Madrid CFF		
2016–	Boca Juniors		

International career
2014–2015	Argentina		
- * Club domestic league appearances and goals

Cecilia Solange Ghigo (born 16 January 1995) is an Argentine footballer who plays as a defender for Boca Juniors. She was a member of the Argentina women's national team.

She appeared at the 2014 South American Games, the 2014 Copa América Femenina and the 2015 Pan American Games.
