= Maximiliano Scapparoni =

Argentine footballer

Personal information
- Full name: Maximiliano Scapparoni
- Date of birth: 13 January 1989 (age 37)
- Place of birth: Caseros, Buenos Aires, Argentina
- Height: 1.81 m (5 ft 11 in)
- Position: Goalkeeper

Youth career
- 1997–2009: Boca Juniors

Senior career*
Years	Team	Apps	(Gls)
2009–2011	Boca Juniors	2	(0)
2010	→ Ñublense (loan)	8	(0)
2011–2013	Los Andes	32	(0)
2013–2018	Independiente Rivadavia	23	(0)
- * Club domestic league appearances and goals

Maximiliano Scapparoni (Spanish pronunciation: [maksimiˈljano skapaˈroni]; born 13 January 1989) is an Argentine retired footballer who played as a goalkeeper.

Scapparoni retired at the end of the 2017–18 season.
