= Andrea Ojeda =

Argentine footballer

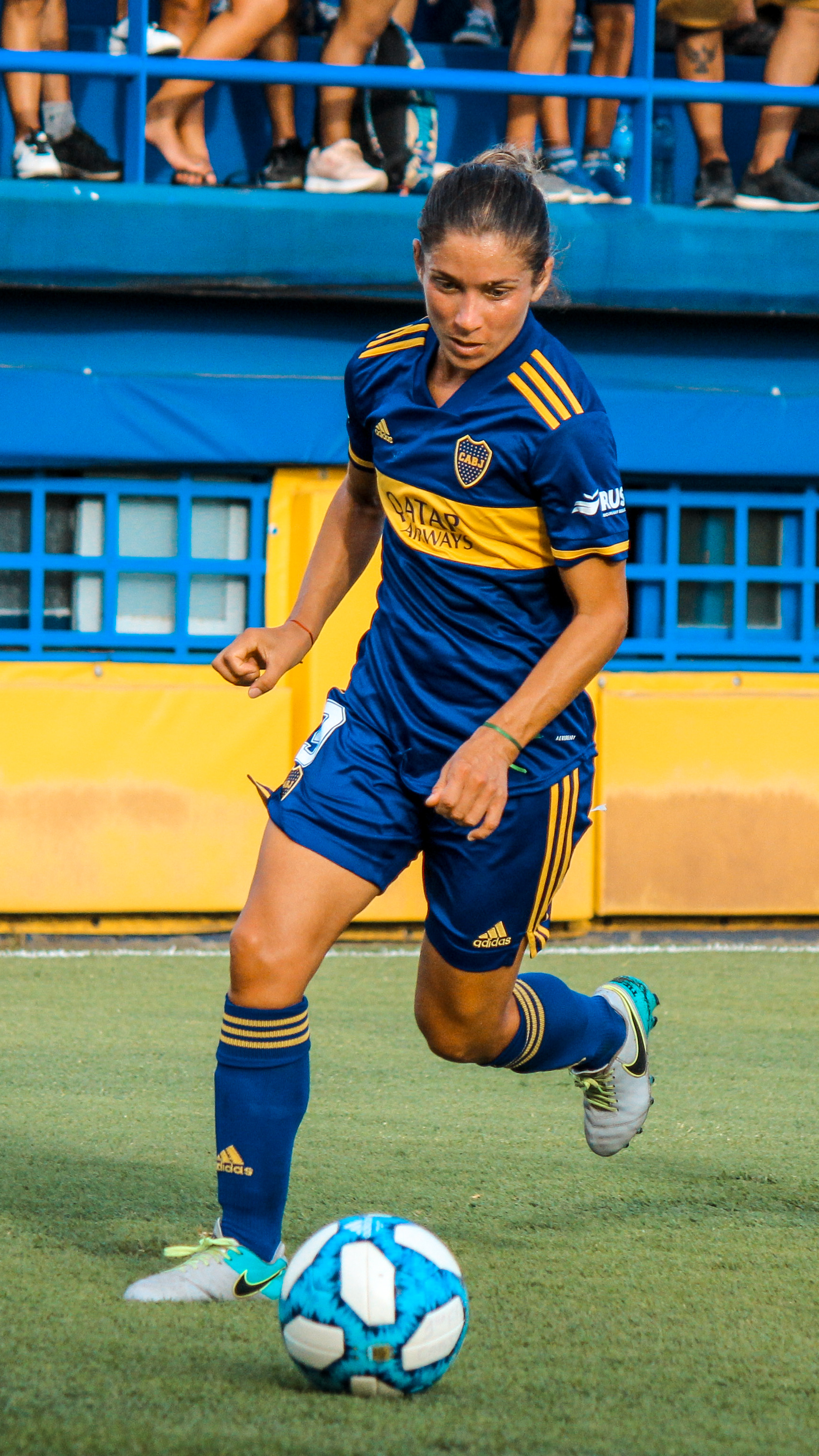
- Ojeda playing for Boca juniors

Personal information
- Full name: Andrea Susana Ojeda
- Date of birth: 17 January 1985 (age 41)
- Place of birth: Glew, Buenos Aires, Argentina
- Position: Forward

Team information
- Current team: Boca Juniors
- Number: 9

Senior career*
Years	Team	Apps	(Gls)
2008–2016	Boca Juniors		
2017–2018	Fundación Albacete	19	(2)
2018–2019	Granada		
2019–	Boca Juniors		

International career
2006–2011	Argentina		
Medal record
Women's football
Representing Argentina
Copa América Femenina
Winner	2006 Argentina
- * Club domestic league appearances and goals

Andrea Susana Ojeda (born 17 January 1985) is an Argentine footballer who plays as a forward for Boca Juniors. She has been a member of the Argentina women's national team.

== Club career ==
Ojeda played in Argentina for Boca Juniors as well in Spain for Fundación Albacete and Granada CF.

== International career ==
Ojeda played for the Argentina women's national team at the Copa América Femenina in 2006 and 2010, at the Pan American Games in 2007 and 2011, at the FIFA Women's World Cup in 2007 and at the Summer Olympic Games in 2008.

== Honours ==
Boca Juniors

- Primera División A: 1999, 2000, 2001 Apertura, 2002 Clausura, 2003 Apertura, 2004 Clausura, 2004 Apertura, 2005 Clausura, 2005 Apertura, 2006 Clausura, 2007 Apertura, 2007 Clausura, 2007 Apertura, 2008 Clausura, 2009 Apertura, 2010 Apertura, 2011 Clausura, 2011 Apertura, 2012 Apertura, 2013 Clausura, 2013 Inicial, 2020, 2021 Clausura, 2022, 2023
- Supercopa Femenina de Argentina: 2015
- Superfinal de Fútbol Femenino de Primera División A: 2021

Argentina

- Copa América Femenina: 2006

Individual

- Primera División A top scorer: 2020, 2022

== See also ==
- Argentina at the 2008 Summer Olympics
- Argentina at the 2011 Pan American Games
