= Lorena Benítez =

Argentine footballer (born 1998)

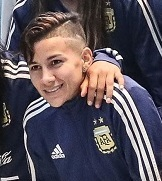
- Benítez with Argentina in 2019

Personal information
- Full name: Flavia Lorena Benítez
- Date of birth: 3 December 1998 (age 27)
- Place of birth: Luis Guillón, Argentina
- Height: 1.56 m (5 ft 1 in)
- Position: Midfielder

Team information
- Current team: Boca Juniors
- Number: 26

Senior career*
Years	Team	Apps	(Gls)
–2016	San Lorenzo	0	(0)
–2017	San Lorenzo (futsal)	0	(0)
2016–2021	Boca Juniors	0	(0)
2017–20??	Kimberley (futsal)		
2022–2023	Estudiantes (BA)		
2023	→ Palmeiras (loan)	1	(0)
2024–	Boca Juniors	0	(0)

International career^{‡}
2015	Argentina U20		
- Argentina U20 (futsal)
2019–	Argentina	22	(0)
- Argentina (futsal)
- * Club domestic league appearances and goals as of 26 February 2023 ‡ National team caps and goals as of 5 May 2024

Flavia Lorena Benítez (born 3 December 1998) is an Argentine professional footballer and former futsal player who plays as a midfielder for Palmeiras and the Argentina women's national team.

== International career ==
Benítez was eligible to play for Argentina (birthplace) or Paraguay (parentage). Although her father wanted her to represent the latter, she was called up to the Albicelestes. She was a part of the Argentine squad at the 2015 South American U-20 Women's Championship. She made her senior debut for Argentina on 3 March 2019 in a 0–2 friendly loss against New Zealand.

== Personal life ==
Benítez is openly gay. On 6 May 2019, her partner, Verónica Rivero, gave birth to their twins. She is a supporter of San Lorenzo. Upon her arrival at Palmeiras in early February 2023, she was a victim of gender-related discriminatory comments by Brazilian fans.

== Honours ==
San Lorenzo

- Primera División A: 2015

Boca Juniors

- Primera División A: 2020, 2021 Clausura
- Súper Final: 2021
- Copa Federal: 2023

Palmeiras

- Supercopa do Brasil de Futebol Feminino: 2026
