= Noelia Espíndola =

Argentine footballer

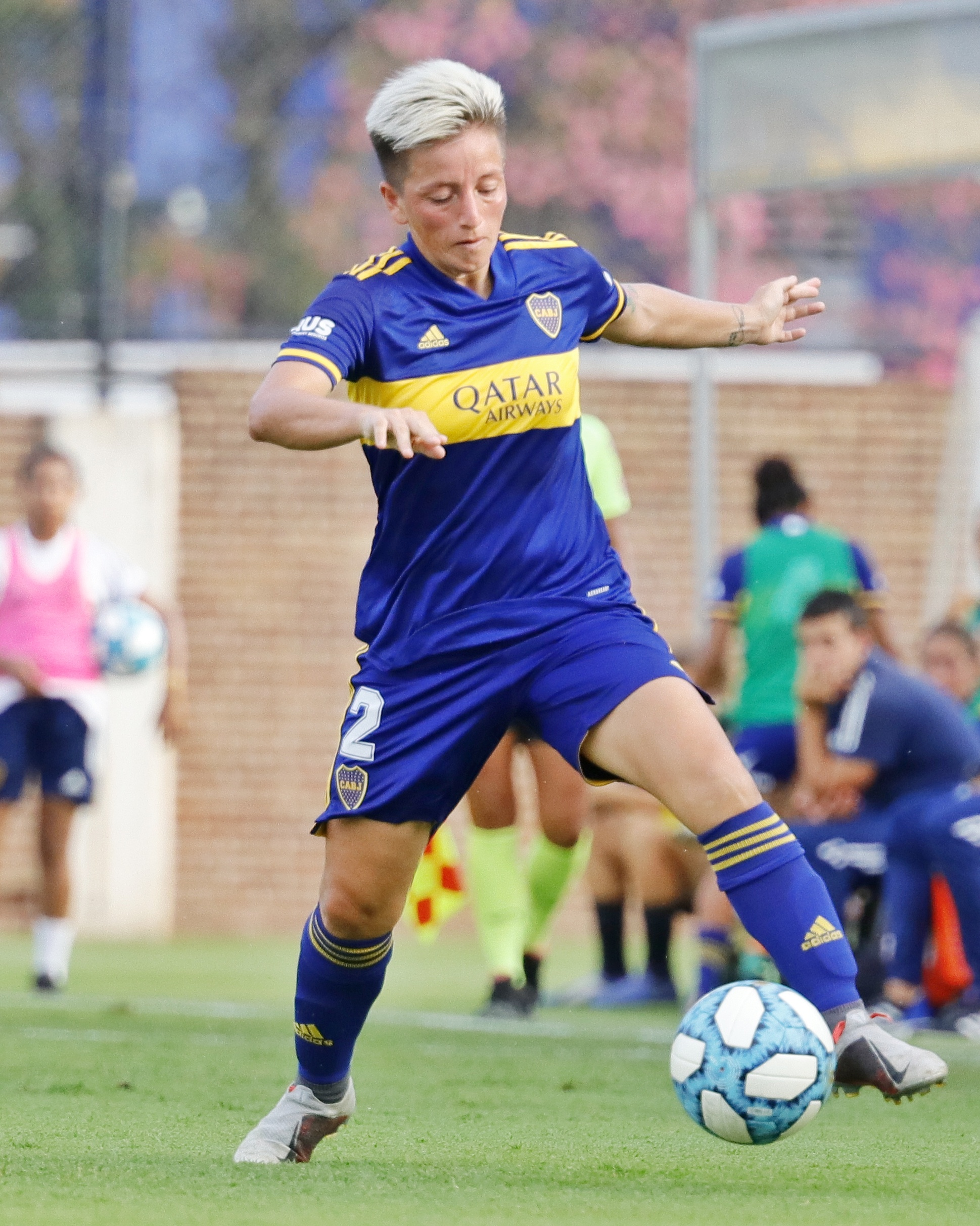

Personal information
- Date of birth: 6 April 1992 (age 34)
- Place of birth: Ituzaingó, Corrientes, Argentina
- Height: 1.60 m (5 ft 3 in)
- Position: Defender

Senior career*
Years	Team	Apps	(Gls)
2008–2017	San Lorenzo		
20017–2023	Boca Juniors		

International career
2007–2008	Argentina U-17		
2008–2012	Argentina U-20	8+	(2+)
2011–2015	Argentina	4+	(0+)
Medal record
Women's football
Representing Argentina
South American Games
Gold medal – first place	2014 Santiago	Team
- * Club domestic league appearances and goals

Noelia Espíndola (born 6 April 1992) is an Argentine footballer who last played as a defender for Boca Juniors. She was a member of the Argentina women's national team.

Espíndola represented Argentina at the 2008 South American U-17 Women's Championship, 2008 FIFA U-20 Women's World Cup, 2011 Pan American Games, 2012 South American U-20 Women's Championship, 2014 South American Games, 2014 Copa América Femenina and at the 2015 Pan American Games.

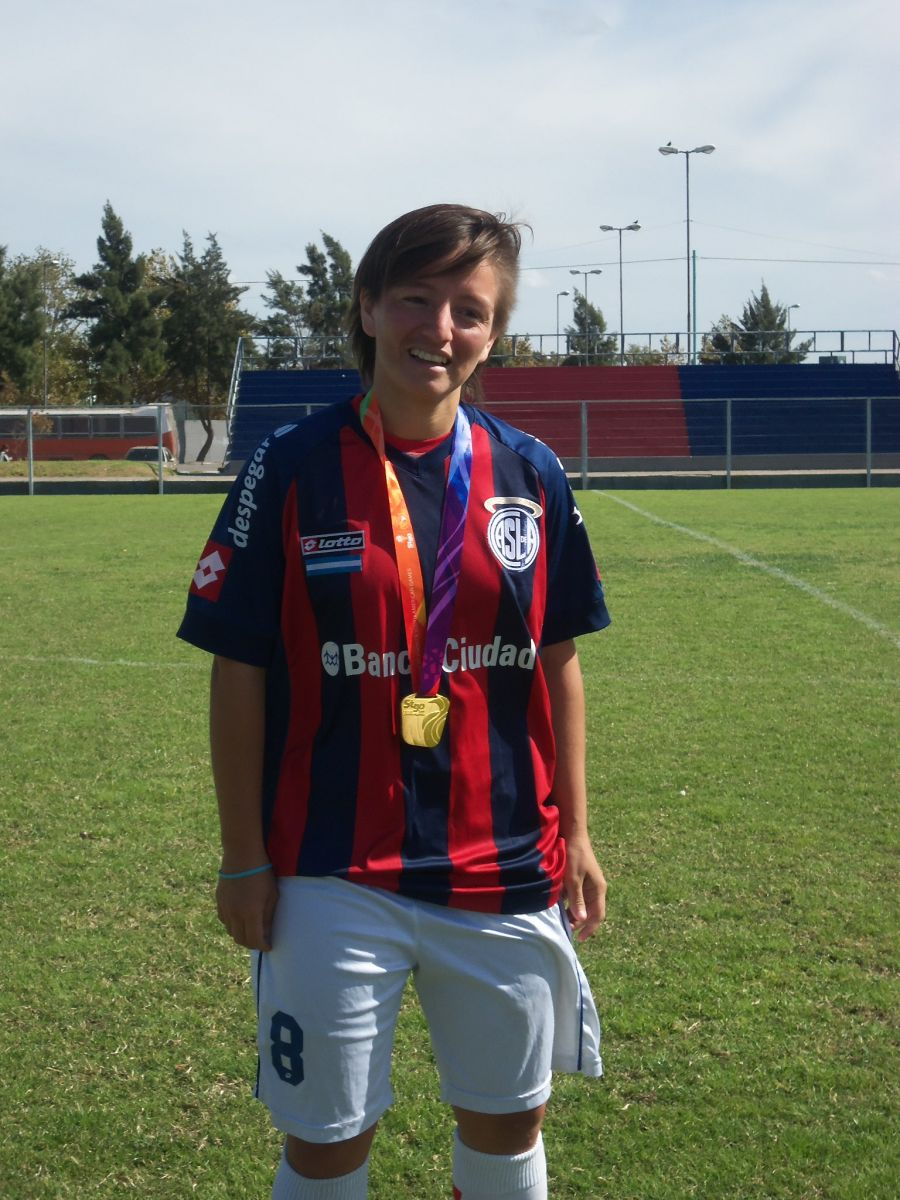
Espíndola during her time at San Lorenzo, wearing the gold medal she won with the Argentina national team at the 2014 South American Games.

== Honours ==
San Lorenzo

- Primera División A: 2008 Apertura, 2015

Boca Juniors

- Primera División A: 2021 Clausura, 2022, 2023
- Copa de la Liga: 2023

Argentina

- South American Games: 2014
