= Laurina Oliveros =

Argentine footballer (born 1993)

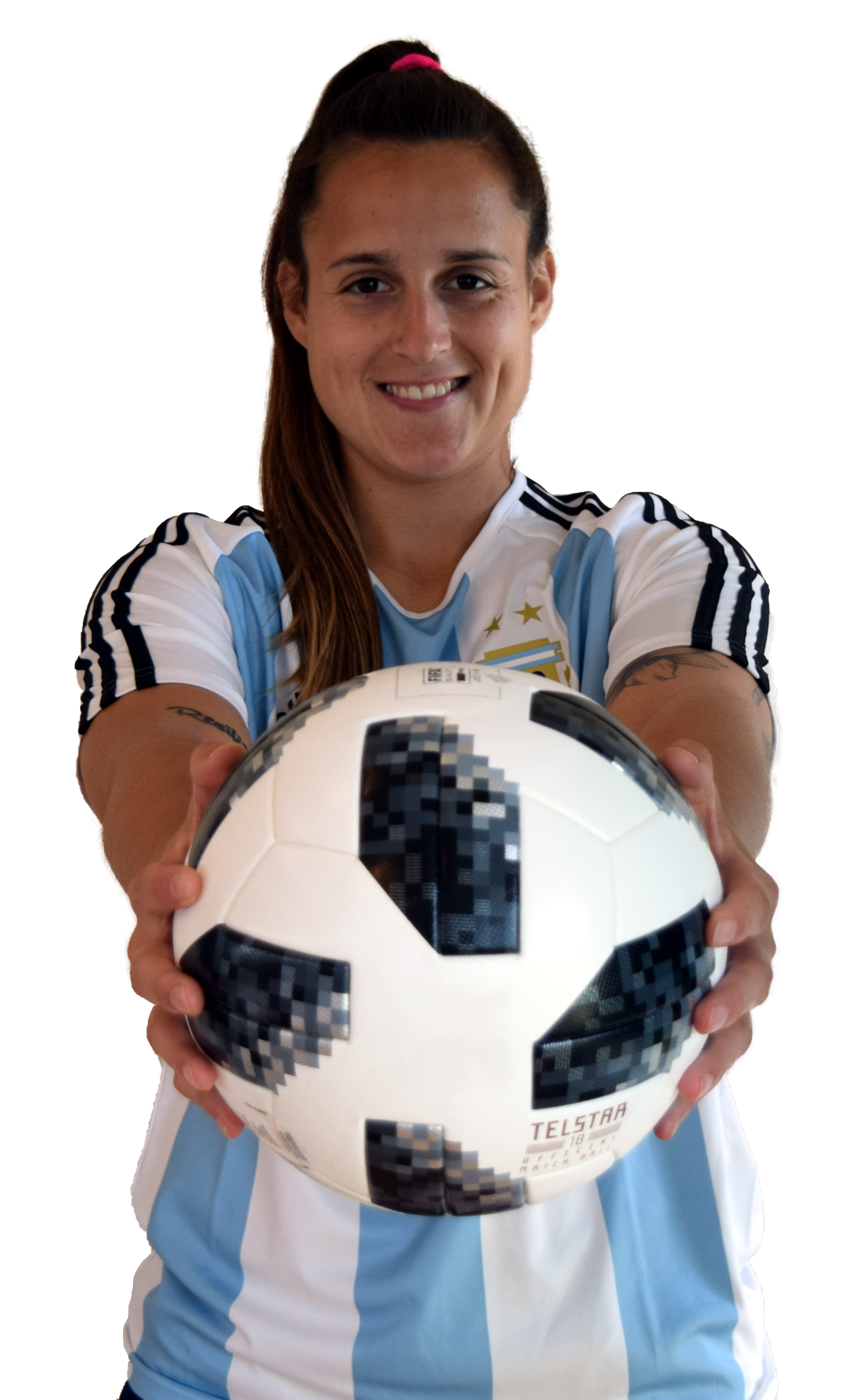

Personal information
- Date of birth: 10 September 1993 (age 33)
- Place of birth: Ramallo, Argentina
- Height: 1.70 m (5 ft 7 in)
- Position: Goalkeeper

Team information
- Current team: Boca Juniors
- Number: 1

Youth career
- 2001–2003: YMCA
- 2003–2004: V.A.Y.S.A
- 2004–2005: Naples Sharks
- 2007: UAI Urquiza

Senior career*
| Years | Team | Apps | (Gls) |
| 2008–2015 | UAI Urquiza | | |
| 2015 | Santiago Morning | | |
| 2016–2019 | UAI Urquiza | | |
| 2019– | Boca Juniors | | |

International career^{‡}
| 2010 | Argentina U17 | 1+ | (0) |
| 2012 | Argentina U20 | 3 | (0) |
| 2014– | Argentina | 18 | (0) |
- * Club domestic league appearances and goals ‡ National team caps and goals as of 28 February 2024

Laurina “Lauchi” Oliveros (born 10 September 1993) is an Argentine footballer who plays as a goalkeeper for Boca Juniors and the Argentina women's national team.

== Early life ==
Oliveros lived in Venice, Florida, United States during her childhood.

== International career ==
Oliveros represented Argentina at the 2010 South American U-17 Women's Championship and the 2012 FIFA U-20 Women's World Cup. At senior level, she received her first international call-up in 2011, but always remained as the second or the third choice for the Argentine goal, being initially Elisabeth Minnig and more recently Vanina Correa the ones who played the matches. Oliveros was a part of the Argentine squads which competed at the 2011 Pan American Games and two Copa América Femenina editions (2014 and 2018). She made her debut on 3 March 2019 as a second half substitution (for Correa) in a 0–2 friendly loss against New Zealand.

== Honours and achievements ==
=== Club ===
UAI Urquiza

- Torneo Clausura: 2012
- Torneo Final: 2014
- Primera A: 2016, 2017–18

== Personal life ==
Oliveros is a supporter of River Plate.
