= Camila Gómez Ares =

Argentine footballer (born 1994)

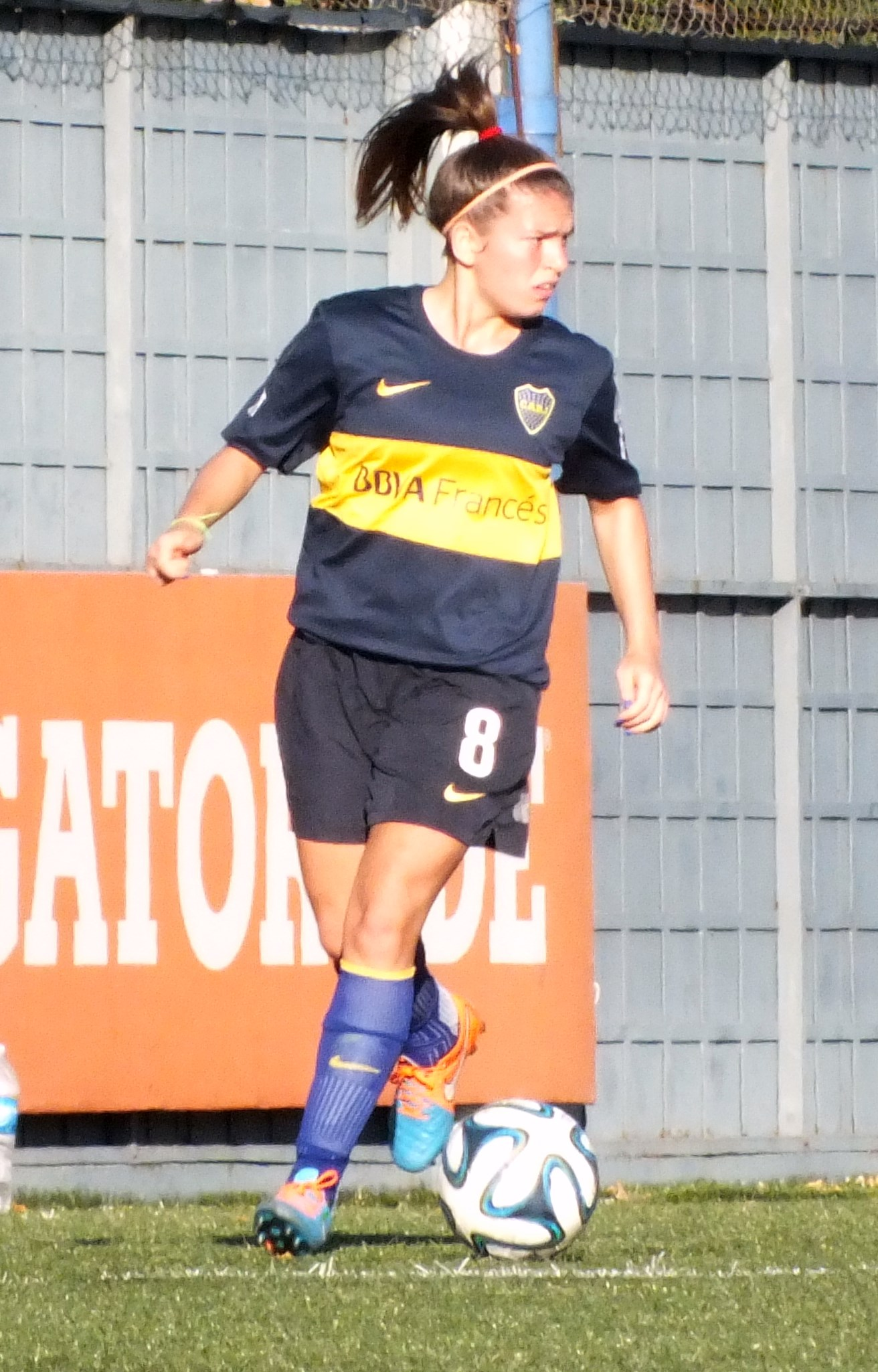
- Gómez Ares with Boca Juniors in 2015

Personal information
- Date of birth: 26 October 1994 (age 32)
- Place of birth: Buenos Aires, Argentina
- Height: 1.57 m (5 ft 2 in)
- Position: Midfielder

Team information
- Current team: Boca Juniors

Senior career*
Years	Team	Apps	(Gls)
2012–2014	River Plate		
2013	→ UAI Urquiza (loan)		
2014–2022	Boca Juniors		
2023	Universidad de Concepción		
2023–	Boca Juniors		

International career
2012	Argentina U-20	3	(0)
2014–	Argentina	16	(1)
Medal record
Women's football
Representing Argentina
South American Games
Gold medal – first place	2014 Santiago	Team
- * Club domestic league appearances and goals

Camila Gómez Ares (born 26 October 1994) is an Argentine footballer who plays as a midfielder for Boca Juniors and the Argentina women's national team.

She appeared at the 2014 South American Games, the 2014 Copa América Femenina and the 2015 Pan American Games. She previously represented Argentina at the 2012 FIFA U-20 Women's World Cup.

== Personal life ==
Gómez Ares is a supporter of San Lorenzo.

== International goals ==
Scores and results list Argentina's goals tally first

No.	Date	Venue	Opponent	Score	Result	Competition
1.	14 July 2023	Estadio Único de San Nicolás, San Nicolás de los Arroyos, Argentina	Peru	4–0	4–0	Friendly

== Honours ==
Boca Juniors

- Primera División A: 2020, 2021 Clausura, 2022
- Supercopa Argentina de Fútbol Femenino : 2015
- Súper Final: 2021
- Copa de la Liga: 2023
- Copa Federal: 2023

Argentina

- South American Games: 2014
