= Elisabeth Minnig =

Argentine footballer

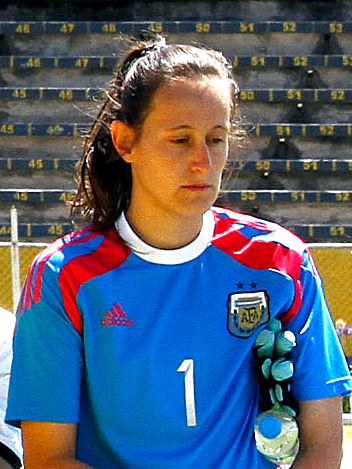

Personal information
- Date of birth: 6 January 1987 (age 39)
- Place of birth: Coronel Suárez, Argentina
- Height: 1.71 m (5 ft 7 in)
- Position: Goalkeeper

Senior career*
Years	Team	Apps	(Gls)
2011–2019	Boca Juniors		

International career^{‡}
2007–2015	Argentina	12	(0)
Medal record
Women's football
Representing Argentina
South American Games
Gold medal – first place	2014 Santiago	Team
- * Club domestic league appearances and goals ‡ National team caps and goals as of 10 September 2007 (before the 2007 FIFA Women's World Cup)

Elisabeth Minnig (born 6 January 1987) is an Argentine retired footballer who played as a goalkeeper. She was a member of the Argentina women's national team.

== International career ==
Minnig represented Argentina at the 2007 FIFA Women's World Cup.
