= Miriam Mayorga =

Argentine footballer (born 1989)

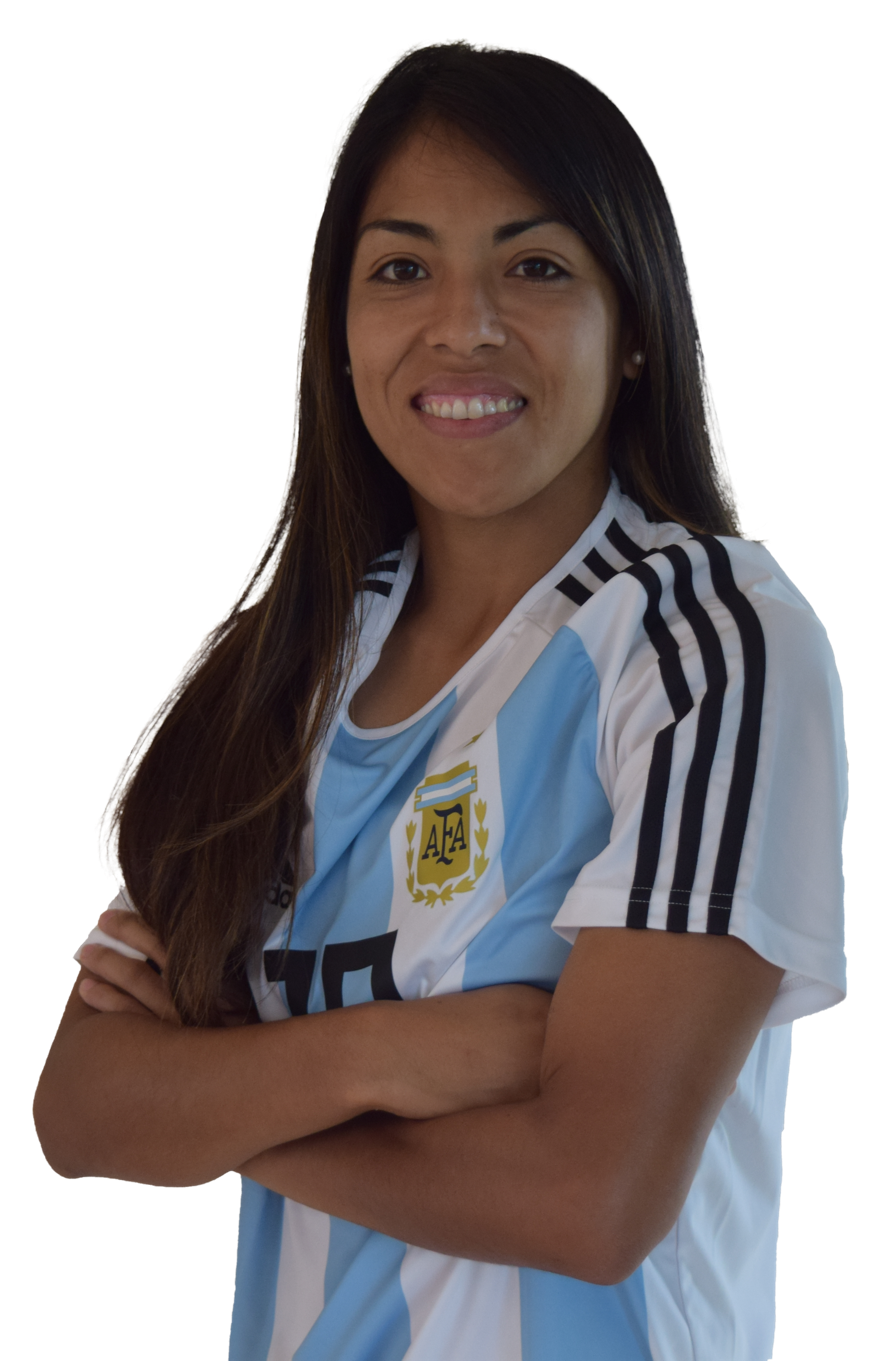

Personal information
- Full name: Miriam Anahí Mayorga
- Date of birth: 20 November 1989 (age 36)
- Place of birth: Bariloche, Río Negro, Argentina
- Height: 1.63 m (5 ft 4 in)
- Positions: Centre-back; defensive midfielder

Senior career*
Years	Team	Apps	(Gls)
2012–2020	UAI Urquiza		
2020–2024	Boca Juniors	0	(0)

International career^{‡}
2017–2024	Argentina	49	(0)
Medal record
Women's football
Representing Argentina
Pan American Games
Silver medal – second place	2019 Lima	Team
- * Club domestic league appearances and goals ‡ National team caps and goals as of 28 February 2024

Miriam Anahí Mayorga (born 20 November 1989) is an Argentine former professional footballer. Currently a centre-back, she operated as a defensive midfielder for most of her career.

== International career ==
Mayorga made her senior debut for Argentina at the 2019 FIFA Women's World Cup qualification (CONCACAF–CONMEBOL play-off) second leg against Panama on 13 November 2018. She started her career for Luna Park, in Bariloche.
