= Maurine (footballer) =

Brazilian footballer (born 1986)

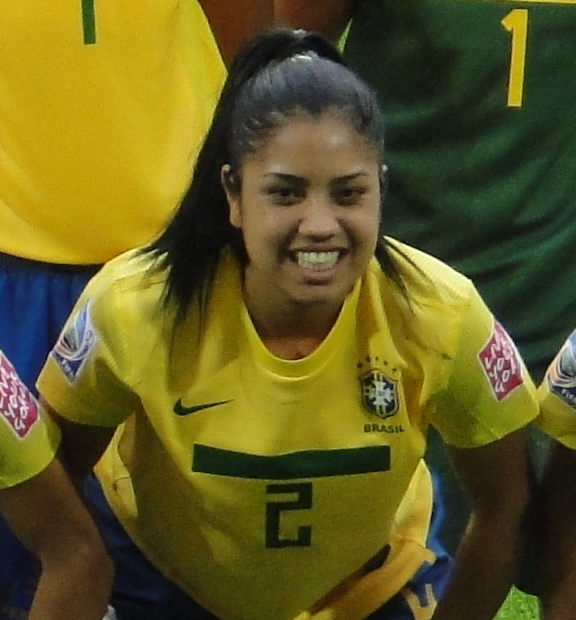
- Maurine at the 2011 FIFA Women's World Cup

Personal information
- Full name: Maurine Dorneles Gonçalves
- Date of birth: 14 January 1986 (age 40)
- Place of birth: Porto Alegre, Brazil
- Height: 1.60 m (5 ft 3 in)
- Positions: Defender; midfielder

Senior career*
Years	Team	Apps	(Gls)
- Grêmio
2006–2007	CEPE-Caxias		
2008–2010	Santos		
2011	Western New York Flash	1	(0)
2011	Santos		
2012–2013	Centro Olímpico		
2014–2015	Ferroviária		
2015–2016	Flamengo	10	(1)
2016–2019	Santos	45	(5)
2020–2021	Famalicão		

International career^{‡}
2002–2006	Brazil U-20		
2007–2017	Brazil		
Medal record
Women's football
Representing Brazil
Olympic Games
Silver medal – second place	2008 Beijing	Team
Pan American Games
Gold medal – first place	2015 Toronto	Team
- * Club domestic league appearances and goals as of 22:32, 28 May 2022 (UTC) ‡ National team caps and goals as of 22:32, 28 May 2022 (UTC)

Maurine Dorneles Gonçalves (born 14 January 1986), commonly known as Maurine, is a Brazilian former footballer who played as a defender or midfielder for the Brazil women's national team. Due to her versatility, she operated in a number of positions throughout her career, but was most often used as a full-back or defensive midfielder. She was part of Brazil's silver medal-winning squad at the 2008 Beijing Olympics and also played at the 2011 and 2015 editions of the FIFA Women's World Cup, as well as the 2012 London Olympics.

At club level Maurine enjoyed three spells with Santos and was hurt when the male parent club disbanded the female section in 2012. She also spent part of the 2011 season with American Women's Professional Soccer (WPS) franchise Western New York Flash. After the 2012 demise of Santos, Maurine and nine other former Santos players agreed to join Centro Olímpico. She also represented Ferroviária and Flamengo, before returning to the re-established Santos club in 2016. She finished her career with a stint at Famalicão in Portugal.

== Club career ==
By the age of 15 Maurine was playing for her local club Grêmio. In 2006 and 2007 she played for CEPE-Caxias of Rio de Janeiro, then joined Santos for the 2008 season. On 22 September 2009, the Atlanta Beat, an expansion team of Women's Professional Soccer (WPS), selected Maurine in the 2009 WPS International Draft, acquiring exclusive rights (within WPS) to negotiate with her. Maurine did not join the American team, instead finding success in the Copa Libertadores Femenina with Santos in 2009 and 2010.

Maurine eventually joined a WPS team in 2011, accompanying Marta to the Western New York Flash. After making a single WPS appearance for the club she returned to Santos.

In early 2012 Santos' board of directors scrapped the women's section, to save money after handing their male player Neymar a gigantic new contract. Maurine and the other players were surprised and hurt by the development.

With Neymar's assistance, Maurine and the other displaced Santos players secured around $1,500,000 in external sponsorship. But Santos' board refused to reverse their decision, claiming that the women's team cost $2,000,000 a year to run and provided no financial return. Instead ten of the players including Maurine moved to Centro Olímpico.

When Santos later reinstated their women's team, Maurine was happy to rejoin for a third stint in July 2016. She was voted the best right-back of the 2018 Campeonato Brasileiro de Futebol Feminino. In June 2021 35-year-old Maurine announced her retirement from football following an 18-month spell in Portugal with Famalicão.

== International career ==
Maurine was part of the Brazil under-20 selection at the FIFA U-20 Women's World Championships in 2002, 2004 and 2006. She debuted for the senior Brazil national team in June 2007, a 2–0 friendly match defeat by the United States at Giants Stadium in New Jersey.

At the 2011 FIFA Women's World Cup, naturally right-footed Maurine was deployed on the left of Brazil's midfield. During the 2011 Pan American Games Maurine was bereaved by the untimely death of her father. She scored the only goal of the semi-final against hosts Mexico and dedicated it to his memory. Later she got a tattoo on her forearm of herself celebrating the goal, bearing the legend: "Father, a great man, a huge yearning."

Maurine was selected for her second Olympic football tournament at London 2012. FIFA.com described her as one of the team's key players. Amidst allegations of a broken down bus plot, Brazil lost their final group E game 1–0 to hosts Great Britain before a record crowd of 70,584 at Wembley Stadium. That meant a quarter-final against World Cup holders Japan, who eliminated Brazil by winning 2–0 at Cardiff's Millennium Stadium.

In May 2014, incoming coach Vadão recalled Maurine to the national team after a gap of nearly two years. In early 2015 Maurine was included in an 18-month residency programme intended to prepare Brazil's national team for the 2015 FIFA Women's World Cup in Canada and the 2016 Rio Olympics. At the World Cup, Maurine appeared in just one of Brazil's four matches, captaining a much-changed team in the 1–0 final group game win over Costa Rica.

After Brazil's 1–0 second round defeat by Australia, Maurine remained in Canada as part of the Brazilian selection for the 2015 Pan American Games in Toronto. On 25 July 2015, Maurine entered the Pan American Games gold medal game against Colombia as a substitute in the 74th minute. From a corner kick, she hit a floater into the wind that curved directly into the goal. She scored on literally her first touch of the ball.

In October 2017 Maurine was one of five Brazil players to quit international football, disgruntled at pay and conditions, and the Brazilian Football Confederation's sacking of head coach Emily Lima.

=== International goals ===
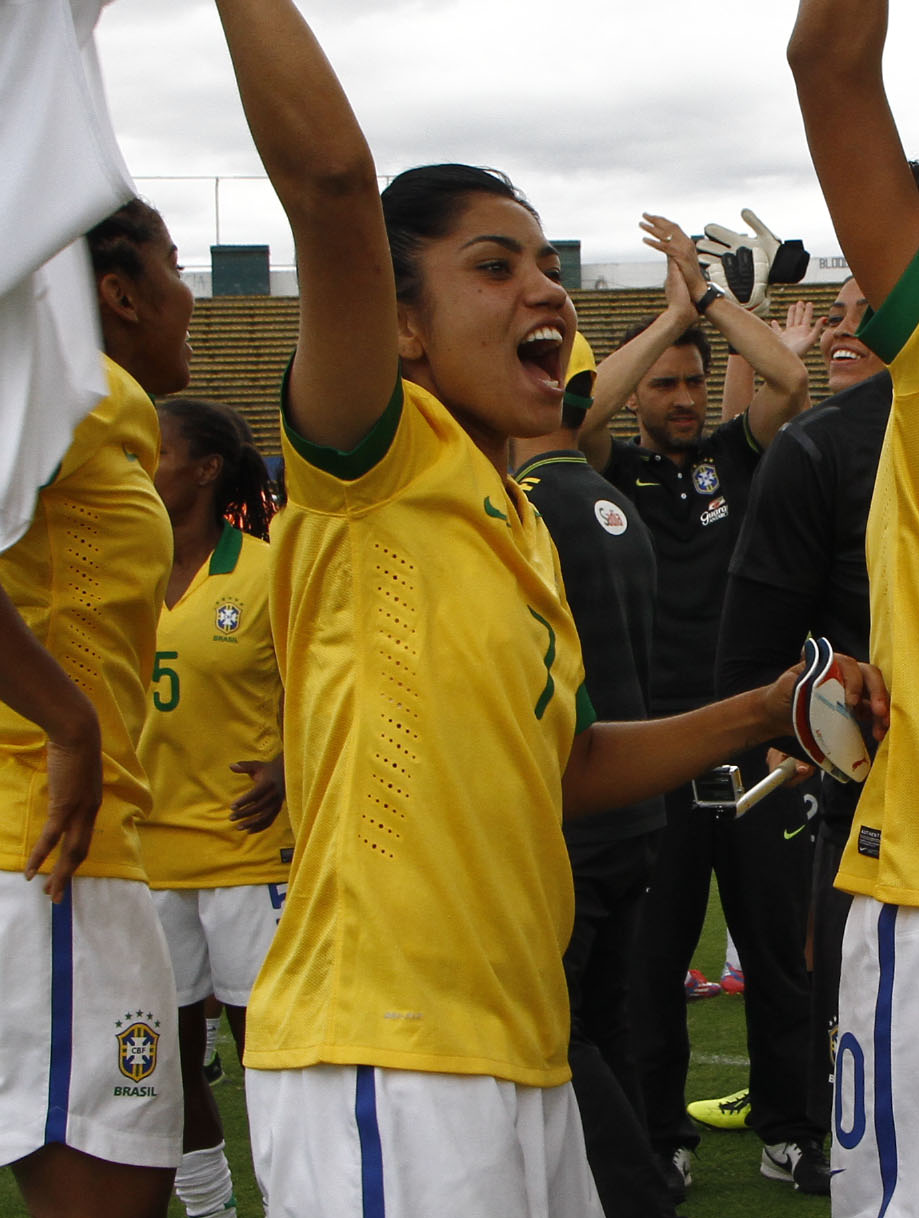
Maurine at the 2014 Copa América Femenina

Goal	Date	Location	Opponent	#	Score	Result	Competition
1.	15 June 2008	Suwon, South Korea	Italy	1.1	2–1	2–1	2008 Peace Queen Cup
2.	22 April 2009	Frankfurt, Germany	Germany	1.1	1–1	1–1	Friendly Match
3.	15 October 2011	Guadalajara, Mexico	Mexico	1.1	1–0	1–0	2011 Pan American Games
4.	18 September 2014	Loja, Ecuador	Chile	1.1	1–0	2–0	2014 Copa América Femenina
5.	24 September 2014	Quito, Ecuador	Ecuador	1.1	3–0	4–0	2014 Copa América Femenina
6.	27 September 2014	Quito, Ecuador	Argentina	1.1	3–0	6–0	2014 Copa América Femenina
7.	15 July 2015	Toronto, Canada	Ecuador	1.1	7–1	7–1	2015 Pan American Games
8.	25 July 2015	Toronto, Canada	Colombia	1.1	2–0	4–0	2015 Pan American Games

== Personal life ==
In December 2013, Maurine was reported to be dating Lucas Surcin, a professional footballer for Audux, who is seven years her junior and the son of Marcelinho Carioca. Reports in 2015 indicated that Maurine had broken up with Surcin and was dating another footballer Wellington. Wellington confirmed in a December 2017 interview with Universo Online that he and Maurine had been in a relationship for three years. He reported that he was performing the homemaking duties while recovering from an anterior cruciate ligament injury. In 2012, Maurine appeared in a glamour modelling photo shoot, to challenge the stereotype that female footballers are not feminine or attractive.
