= Natalia Gatti =

Argentine footballer (born 1982)

Personal information
- Date of birth: 20 October 1982 (age 44)
- Position: Forward

Senior career*
| Years | Team | Apps | (Gls) |
- Boca Juniors

International career^{‡}
| | Argentina | 17 | (0) |
- * Club domestic league appearances and goals ‡ National team caps and goals as of 10 September 2007 (before the 2007 FIFA Women's World Cup)

Natalia Gatti (born 20 October 1982) is an Argentine women's international footballer who plays as a forward. She is a member of the Argentina women's national football team. Gatti was part of the national team at the 2003 FIFA Women's World Cup and 2007 FIFA Women's World Cup. At the club level, she played for Boca Juniors in Argentina, and currently plays for KAC (Kimberley Athletic Club).
