= Marisa Gerez =

Argentine footballer (born 1976)

Personal information
- Full name: Marisa Isabel Gerez
- Date of birth: 3 November 1976 (age 49)
- Place of birth: Argentina
- Position: Defender

Senior career*
Years	Team	Apps	(Gls)
2008	Boca Juniors		
- Everton

International career
2003–2011	Argentina	0 (?)	(0)
- * Club domestic league appearances and goals

Marisa Isabel Gerez (born 3 November 1976) is an Argentine football defender who played for the Argentina women's national football team. She was part of the national squad that participated in the football competition at the 2008 Summer Olympics. At the club level, she played for Boca Juniors.

== See also ==
- Argentina at the 2008 Summer Olympics
