= Clarisa Huber =

Argentine footballer

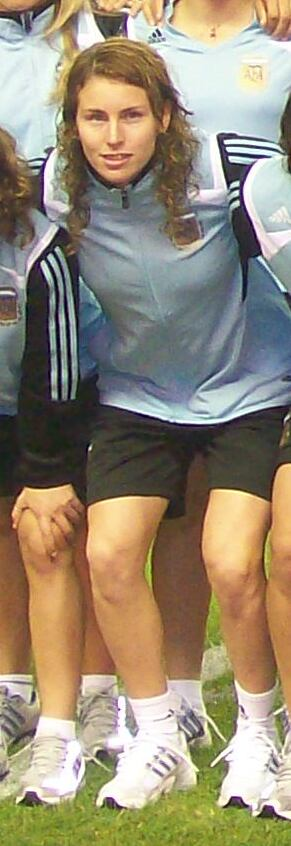
- With Argentina's 2007 World Cup team

Personal information
- Full name: Clarisa Belén Huber
- Date of birth: 22 December 1984 (age 41)
- Place of birth: Tandil, Argentina
- Position: Midfielder

Team information
- Current team: Boca Juniors
- Number: 18

Youth career
- 1994–1999: Alquiler Canchas de Fútbol

Senior career*
Years	Team	Apps	(Gls)
1999–2003	El Porvenir (Fs)		
2003–2008	Boca Juniors (Fb)		
2008–2011	Prainsa Zaragoza (Fb)	27	(8 (Note: League appearances and goals from the 2008–2009 season.))
2011–?	CA Atlanta (Fs)		
2019–	Boca Juniors (Fb)		

International career
2003–2009	Argentina (Fb)		
2011–	Argentina (Fs)		
- * Club domestic league appearances and goals

Clarisa Belén Huber (born 22 December 1984) is an Argentine footballer who plays as a midfielder for Boca Juniors. She has been a member of the Argentina women's national team. She also played futsal at Club El Porvenir, CA Atlanta and the Argentina women's national team.

== Club career ==
Huber started her career in 1999 for futsal club El Porvenir. In 2003, she transferred to association football, signing for Boca Juniors and debuting with the Argentine national team, with which she played the 2003 and 2007 FIFA World Cups. In 2008, she moved to Spain to play for Prainsa Zaragoza.

Returning to Argentina in 2011, she subsequently focused in futsal, and she was the captain of the Argentine national team at the 2011 World Tournament.

== Personal life ==
Huber is of Austrian descent.
