= Valeria Cotelo =

Argentine footballer

Personal information
- Full name: Valeria Tamara Cotelo
- Date of birth: 26 March 1984 (age 42)
- Position: Defender

Senior career*
Years	Team	Apps	(Gls)
- Boca Juniors

International career^{‡}
	Argentina	7	(0)
- * Club domestic league appearances and goals ‡ National team caps and goals as of 10 September 2007 (before the 2007 FIFA Women's World Cup)

Valeria Tamara Cotelo (born 26 March 1984) is an Argentine women's international footballer who plays as a defender. She is a member of the Argentina women's national football team. She was part of the national team at the 2003 FIFA Women's World Cup and the 2007 FIFA Women's World Cup. At the club level, she plays for Boca Juniors in Argentina.
