= Adriana Sachs =

Argentine footballer (born 1993)

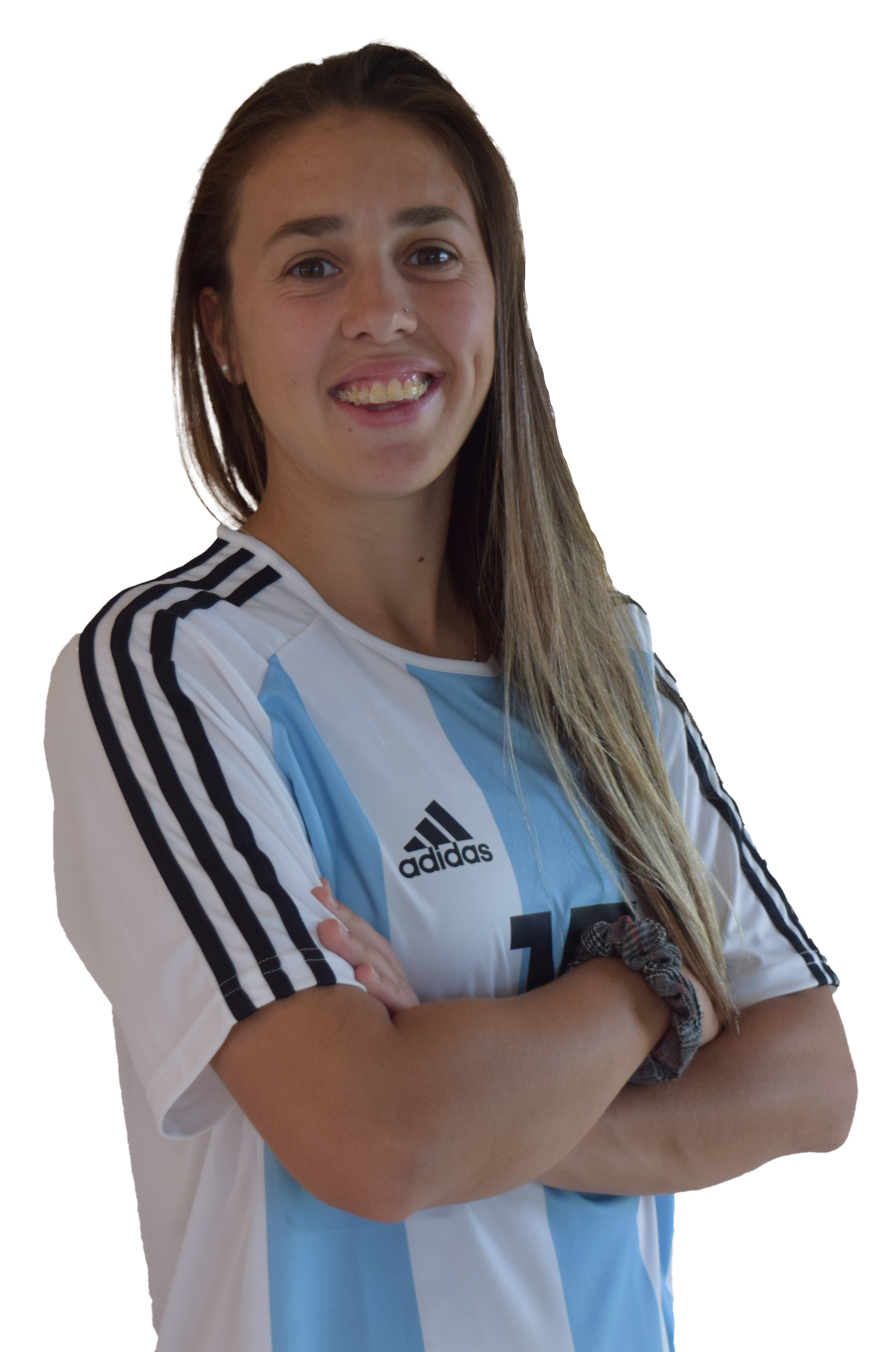

Personal information
- Full name: Adriana María Sachs
- Date of birth: 25 December 1993 (age 32)
- Place of birth: Libertad, Buenos Aires, Argentina
- Height: 1.63 m (5 ft 4 in)
- Position: Centre-back

Team information
- Current team: Racing Club
- Number: 35

Senior career*
Years	Team	Apps	(Gls)
2011–2015	Huracán		
2016–2020	UAI Urquiza		
2020–2021	Collerense	2	(0)
2021–2022	Boca Juniors		
2023	Santos	1	(1)
2023–	Racing Club		

International career^{‡}
2012	Argentina U20	3	(0)
2014–	Argentina	46	(0)
Medal record
Women's football
Representing Argentina
Copa América Femenina
Third place	2018 Chile
Third place	2025 Ecuador
Pan American Games
Silver medal – second place	2019 Lima	Team
South American Games
Gold medal – first place	2014 Santiago	Team
- * Club domestic league appearances and goals as of 5 June 2023 ‡ National team caps and goals as of 2 August 2025

Adriana María Sachs (born 25 December 1993) is an Argentine professional footballer who plays as a centre-back for Racing Club and the Argentina women's national team.

== Club career ==
After playing for Huracán and UAI Urquiza in her home country, Sachs moved to Spanish Segunda División Pro side UD Collerense in July 2020. After playing in just two matches, she returned to Argentina in the following year, with Boca Juniors.

On 15 January 2023, after being a regular starter in Boca's 2022 Copa Libertadores Femenina runner-up campaign, Sachs was announced at Brazilian club Santos. On 21 July 2023, she and her compatriot Eliana Stábile were released by the club. Sachs came back to Argentina and on 13 August 2023 signed with Racing Club.

== International career ==
Sachs represented Argentina at the 2012 FIFA U-20 Women's World Cup. She made her senior debut on 16 March 2014. That day, Argentina won the gold medal at the South American Games. She later played for the country at two Copa América Femenina editions (2014 and 2018) and the Pan American Games in 2015 and 2019.

== Career statistics ==
=== International ===
As of match played 1 August 2025

Appearances and goals by national team and year
National team	Year	Apps	Goals
Argentina	2014	7	0
Argentina	2015	1	0
Argentina	2017	3	0
Argentina	2018	10	0
Argentina	2019	10	0
Argentina	2021	3	0
Argentina	2023	7	0
Argentina	2024	3	0
Argentina	2025	2	0
Total		46	0

== Honours ==
UAI Urquiza

- Primera División A: 2016, 2017–18, 2018–19

Boca Juniors

- Primera División A: 2021 Clausura, 2022
- Súper Final: 2021
