= Carmen Brusca =

Argentinian footballer and futsal player

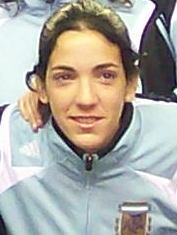
- Carmen Brusca Women's World Cup FIFA 2007

Personal information
- Date of birth: 7 November 1985 (age 40)
- Position: Defender

Senior career*
Years	Team	Apps	(Gls)
- Boca Juniors
2017	Racing (futsal)		

International career^{‡}
	Argentina	17	(0)
2017	Argentina (futsal)		
- * Club domestic league appearances and goals ‡ National team caps and goals as of 10 September 2007 (before the 2007 FIFA Women's World Cup)

Carmen Brusca (born 7 November 1985) is an Argentine futsal player and a former footballer who played as a defender.

She was a member of the Argentina women's national football team. She was part of the national team at the 2007 FIFA Women's World Cup. At the club level, she played for Boca Juniors in Argentina.
