= 2012 CONCACAF Women's U-20 Championship squads =

This article lists the squads for the 2012 CONCACAF Under-20 Women's Championship held in Panama. The 8 national teams involved in the tournament were required to register a squad of 20 players; only players in these squads were eligible to take part in the tournament.

Players marked (c) were named as captain for their national squad. Number of caps, players' club teams and players' age as of 1 March 2012 – the tournament's opening day.

== Group A ==
=== Canada ===
Coach: (Canada) Andrew Olivieri

No.	Pos.	Player	Date of birth (age)	Caps	Goals	Club
1	GK	Sabrina D'Angelo	November 5, 1993 (aged 18)			(United States Soccer Federation) South Carolina
2	MF	Kylie Davis	July 22, 1994 (aged 17)			(United States Soccer Federation) Memphis
3	DF	Nicole Hill	September 10, 1992 (aged 19)			(United States Soccer Federation) Georgia
4	DF	Rachel Melhado	September 24, 1992 (aged 19)			(United States Soccer Federation) Louisville
5	DF	Shelina Zadorsky (c)	October 24, 1992 (aged 19)			(United States Soccer Federation) Michigan
6	MF	Jaclyn Sawicki	November 14, 1992 (aged 19)			(Canadian Soccer Association) Victoria
7	MF	Constance de Chantal-Dumont	March 11, 1992 (aged 19)			(Canadian Soccer Association) Champlain College Saint-Lambert
8	MF	Danica Wu	August 13, 1992 (aged 19)			(United States Soccer Federation) Ohio State
9	MF	Catherine Charron-Delage	June 15, 1992 (aged 19)			(Canadian Soccer Association) Laval Comets
10	MF	Christabel Oduro	November 1, 1992 (aged 19)			(United States Soccer Federation) Memphis
11	FW	Jenna Richardson	July 6, 1992 (aged 19)			(United States Soccer Federation) Oregon State
12	MF	Nicole Setterlund	February 16, 1993 (aged 19)			(United States Soccer Federation) Washington State
13	FW	Amélia Pietrangelo	July 14, 1993 (aged 18)			(United States Soccer Federation) Rutgers
15	MF	Vanessa Legault-Cordisco	May 11, 1992 (aged 19)			(United States Soccer Federation) Marquette
16	FW	Diamond Simpson	April 28, 1993 (aged 18)			(Canadian Soccer Association) Hamilton FC Rage
17	FW	Nkem Ezurike	March 19, 1992 (aged 19)			(United States Soccer Federation) Michigan
18	GK	Dayle Colpitts	April 18, 1992 (aged 19)			(Canadian Soccer Association) Virginia Tech
19	MF	Olivia Colosimo	April 11, 1992 (aged 19)			(United States Soccer Federation) Butler
20	DF	Lauren Granberg	February 28, 1992 (aged 20)			(United States Soccer Federation) Ohio State
21	DF	Christine Exeter	September 3, 1992 (aged 19)			(United States Soccer Federation) Louisville

=== Mexico ===
Coach: (Mexico) Roberto Medina

No.	Pos.	Player	Date of birth (age)	Caps	Goals	Club
1	GK	Cecilia Santiago	19 October 1994 (aged 17)			(Mexican Football Federation) Club Santos Laguna
2	DF	Arianna Romero	29 July 1992 (aged 19)			
3	DF	Bianca Sierra	25 June 1992 (aged 19)			
4	DF	Christina Murillo	28 January 1993 (aged 19)			
5	MF	Ashley Kotero	23 November 1992 (aged 19)			
6	DF	Olivia Jiménez	26 February 1992 (aged 20)			
7	MF	Nayeli Rangel (C)	28 February 1992 (aged 20)			
8	DF	Ariana Martínez	25 January 1992 (aged 20)			
9	FW	Tanya Samarzich	28 December 1994 (aged 17)			
10	MF	Natalia Gomez Junco	9 October 1992 (aged 19)			
11	FW	Chrystal Martínez	12 October 1993 (aged 18)			
12	DF	Rosa Mérida	31 May 1993 (aged 18)			
13	FW	Briana López	21 April 1992 (aged 19)			
14	FW	Fernanda Piña	17 December 1993 (aged 18)			
15	DF	Alejandra Amador	14 September 1993 (aged 18)			
16	DF	Cristina Ferral	16 February 1993 (aged 19)			
17	MF	Yamile Franco	7 July 1992 (aged 19)			
18	MF	Mariel Gutiérrez	16 August 1994 (aged 17)			
19	MF	Andrea Sánchez	31 March 1994 (aged 17)			
20	FW	Daniela Solís	19 April 1993 (aged 18)			

== Group B ==
=== Cuba ===
Coach: (Cuba) José Luis Elejalde

No.	Pos.	Player	Date of birth (age)	Caps	Goals	Club
1	GK	Dainelis Moreno	3 February 1992 (aged 20)			
2	MF	Tayde Aguilar	21 November 1994 (aged 17)			
3	DF	Indira Manzano	11 October 1993 (aged 18)			
4	FW	Milagros Ramírez	22 June 1995 (aged 16)			
5	DF	Yarisleidy Mena	17 February 1994 (aged 18)			
6	DF	Esmeralda Marcos	13 February 1994 (aged 18)			
7	MF	Solayne Gutiérrez	17 August 1993 (aged 18)			
8	FW	Yanet Tamayo	6 December 1994 (aged 17)			
9	MF	Maria Perez	7 September 1992 (aged 19)			
11	MF	Rachel Peláez	5 May 1993 (aged 18)			
12	GK	Maisú León	6 May 1992 (aged 19)			
14	FW	Maidoni Goitizolo	29 May 1992 (aged 19)			
15	DF	Odette Bayeaux	15 November 1992 (aged 19)			
16	MF	Roxana Galán	24 January 1995 (aged 17)			
17	DF	Regla de la Ponce	23 September 1995 (aged 16)			
18	FW	Yoanna Calderón	20 September 1994 (aged 17)			
	GK	Katherine Montesino	17 January 1992 (aged 20)			
	DF	Wendy Martínez	18 May 1994 (aged 17)			
	DF	Laura García	5 January 1994 (aged 18)			
	DF	Chaveli de la Caridad Butros	5 March 1994 (aged 17)			
	MF	Laura Moreno Marques	18 September 1993 (aged 18)			

=== Guatemala ===
Coach: (Guatemala) Benjamín Monterroso

No.	Pos.	Player	Date of birth (age)	Caps	Goals	Club
1	DF	Noemy Franco	26 November 1994 (aged 17)	0	0	(National Football Federation of Guatemala) Unifut
3	DF	Marilyn Rivera (C)	19 February 1992 (aged 20)	13	0	(National Football Federation of Guatemala) Unifut
5	FW	Londy Barrios	8 April 1992 (aged 19)	13	0	(National Football Federation of Guatemala) Unifut
6	DF	Jeymi Hernández	2 December 1993 (aged 18)	2	0	(National Football Federation of Guatemala) Muniguate
7	DF	Gabriela Elizabeth Mejía	8 August 1993 (aged 18)	0	0	(National Football Federation of Guatemala) Unifut
9	MF	Mía Espino	6 September 1994 (aged 17)			
10	MF	Yoseline Razuleu	1 November 1994 (aged 17)	0	0	(Canadian Soccer Association) Vancouver Island Wave
11	FW	Carmen García-Gallont	26 July 1993 (aged 18)	3	0	
12	GK	Stephanie Castellón	27 August 1992 (aged 19)	5	0	(United States Soccer Federation) Houston Baptist University
13	DF	Clahyri Calderón	10 November 1994 (aged 17)	0	0	(National Football Federation of Guatemala) Deportivo Xela
14	MF	María Isabel Argueta	23 March 1993 (aged 18)	0	0	(National Football Federation of Guatemala) Profutbol
15	DF	Marlen Véliz	11 February 1993 (aged 19)	1	0	(National Football Federation of Guatemala) Unifut
16	FW	Rocío Velásquez	2 February 1993 (aged 19)	0	0	(National Football Federation of Guatemala) Deportivo Xela
17	FW	Marleny Marroquín	17 September 1992 (aged 19)	0	0	(National Football Federation of Guatemala) Guastatoya
18	MF	Daniela Andrade	4 April 1992 (aged 19)	1	0	(United States Soccer Federation) Univ. of South Florida
20	FW	Idania Pérez	3 June 1992 (aged 19)	9	4	(National Football Federation of Guatemala) Jutiapanecas
	DF	Ana Virginia Hernández	14 November 1994 (aged 17)	0	0	(National Football Federation of Guatemala) Pares
	MF	Cinthya López	23 August 1993 (aged 18)	14	0	(National Football Federation of Guatemala) Unifut
	FW	María Amanda Monterroso	30 November 1993 (aged 18)	15	5	(National Football Federation of Guatemala) Unifut

=== Panama ===
Coach: (Panama) Luis Tejada

No.	Pos.	Player	Date of birth (age)	Caps	Goals	Club
1	GK	Anyuri Montenegro	26 July 1993 (aged 18)			(Panamanian Football Federation) Estrellas Chiricanas
2	DF	Natalia Mills	22 March 1993 (aged 18)			(Panamanian Football Federation) Navy Bay
3	DF	Onelys Alvarado	20 August 1993 (aged 18)			(Panamanian Football Federation) Veraguas Nva Generacion
4	MF	Yomira Sanford	22 September 1995 (aged 16)			(Panamanian Football Federation) CAI La Chorrera
5	MF	Leslie Fareaux	20 June 1992 (aged 19)			(Panamanian Football Federation) Navy Bay
6	MF	Leyda Camacho	4 July 1992 (aged 19)			(Panamanian Football Federation) Navy Bay
7	DF	Yerenis De León	23 February 1995 (aged 17)			(Panamanian Football Federation) Navy Bay
8	MF	Yaniska García	21 June 1992 (aged 19)			(Panamanian Football Federation) Navy Bay
9	FW	Ángela Evans (c)	21 July 1993 (aged 18)			(Panamanian Football Federation) Olympic SD
10	FW	Marta Cox	20 July 1997 (aged 14)			(Panamanian Football Federation) Chorrillo FC
11	MF	Yvamara Rodríguez	21 June 1992 (aged 19)			(Canadian Soccer Association) Kwantlen Polytechnic University
12	GK	Dayton Wetherby	5 September 1994 (aged 17)			(United States Soccer Federation) Brandon Flames
13	MF	Marggie Moreno	10 August 1993 (aged 18)			(Panamanian Football Federation) Chorrillo FC
14	MF	Yessenia Zorilla	27 October 1993 (aged 18)			(Panamanian Football Federation) CAI La Chorrera
15	DF	Astrid Díaz	14 February 1995 (aged 17)			
16	DF	Katherine González	9 April 1997 (aged 14)			(Panamanian Football Federation) Estrellas Chiricanas
17	MF	Mayra Jordan	2 July 1994 (aged 17)			(Panamanian Football Federation) Veraguas Nva Generacion
18	MF	Yanis Sanjur	9 May 1995 (aged 16)			
19	FW	Eimy Quintero	15 November 1994 (aged 17)			(Panamanian Football Federation) CAI La Chorrera
20	FW	Karla Riley	18 September 1997 (aged 14)			

=== United States ===
Coach: (United States) Steve Swanson

No.	Pos.	Player	Date of birth (age)	Caps	Goals	Club
1	GK	Bryane Heaberlin	November 2, 1993 (aged 18)			(United States Soccer Federation) North Carolina
2	DF	Mollie Pathman (c)	July 1, 1992 (aged 19)			(United States Soccer Federation) Duke
3	DF	Cari Roccaro	July 18, 1994 (aged 17)			(United States Soccer Federation) Albertson Fury
4	DF	Crystal Dunn	July 3, 1992 (aged 19)			(United States Soccer Federation) North Carolina
5	DF	Kassey Kallman	May 6, 1992 (aged 19)			(United States Soccer Federation) Florida State
6	MF	Morgan Brian	February 26, 1993 (aged 19)			(United States Soccer Federation) Virginia
7	FW	Kealia Ohai	January 31, 1992 (aged 20)			(United States Soccer Federation) North Carolina
8	MF	Julie Johnston	April 6, 1992 (aged 19)			(United States Soccer Federation) Santa Clara
9	FW	Chioma Ubogagu	September 10, 1992 (aged 19)			(United States Soccer Federation) Stanford
10	MF	Mandy Laddish	May 13, 1992 (aged 19)			(United States Soccer Federation) Notre Dame
11	FW	Lindsey Horan	May 26, 1994 (aged 17)			(United States Soccer Federation) Colorado Rush
12	MF	Vanessa DiBernardo	May 15, 1992 (aged 19)			(United States Soccer Federation) Illinois
13	FW	Micaela Capelle	June 28, 1992 (aged 19)			(United States Soccer Federation) Portland
14	FW	Katie Stengel	February 29, 1992 (aged 20)			(United States Soccer Federation) Wake Forest
15	MF	Samantha Mewis	October 9, 1992 (aged 19)			(United States Soccer Federation) UCLA
16	MF	Sarah Killion	July 27, 1992 (aged 19)			(United States Soccer Federation) UCLA
17	DF	Olivia Brannon	February 8, 1993 (aged 19)			(United States Soccer Federation) Virginia
18	GK	Abby Smith	October 4, 1993 (aged 18)			(United States Soccer Federation) Dallas Texans
19	DF	Stephanie Amack	December 23, 1994 (aged 17)			(United States Soccer Federation) Mustang Blast
20	FW	Maya Hayes	March 26, 1992 (aged 19)			(United States Soccer Federation) Penn State
