= Sabrina (given name) =

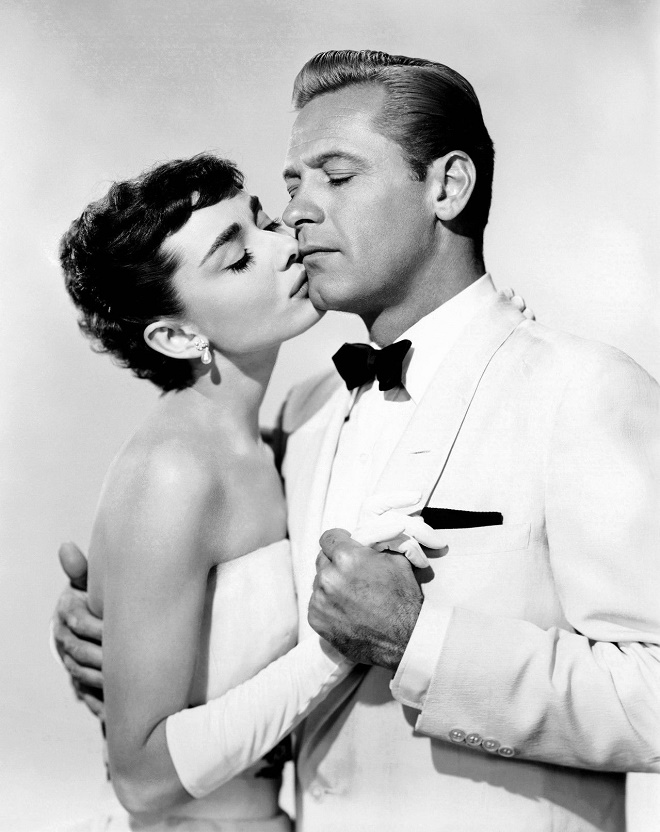
- Audrey Hepburn, pictured with co-star William Holden, portrayed Sabrina Fairchild in the 1954 film Sabrina
- Gender: Female
- Language: Romano-British

Origin
- Meaning: From the name of River Severn

Other names
- Nicknames: Bree, Brie
- Related names: Sabra, Sabrah, Sabreena, Sabryn, Sabryna

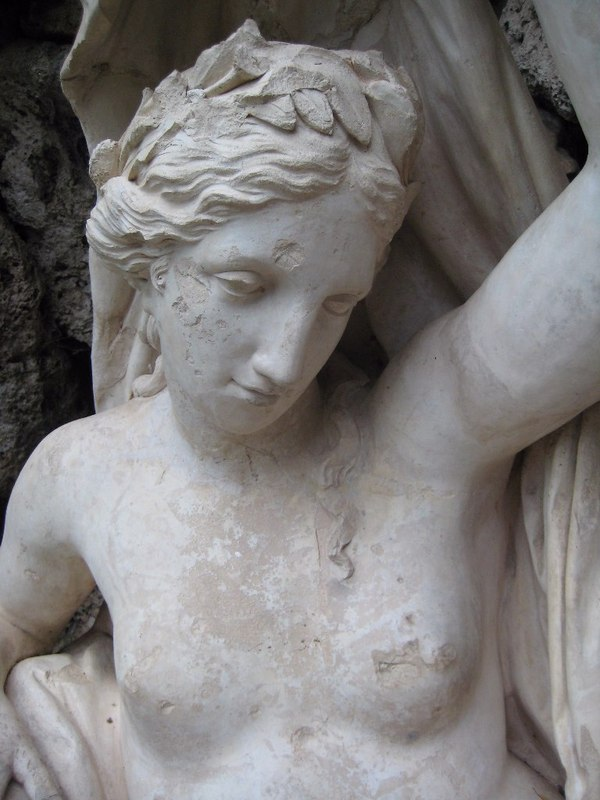
Sabrina, a statue of the legendary figure at Croome D'Abitot in Worcestershire, England

Sabrina is a feminine given name derived from Proto-Celtic *Sabrinā.

== Etymology ==
The name of the river Severn was recorded as early as the 2nd century in the Latinized form Sabrina. The reconstructed British form is *Sabrinā. The modern Welsh form is Hafren or Habren.

Its Arabic equivalent is صابرينا ṣābrīnā, resulting from a folk etymology from the root ص ب ر "patience", although there is another variant سابرينا sābrīnā, its use is mostly restricted to Persians and other non-Arabs.

== Welsh legend ==
According to a legend recounted by Geoffrey of Monmouth in the 12th century, Habren was the daughter of a king named Locrinus (also known as Locrin or Locrine in English) by his mistress, the Germanic princess Estrildis. Locrinus ruled England after the death of his father, Brutus of Troy, the legendary second founder of Britain. Locrinus cast aside his wife, Guendolen, and their son Maddan and acknowledged Sabrina and her mother, but the enraged Guendolen raised an army against him and defeated Locrinus in battle. Guendolen then ordered that Sabrina and her mother be drowned in the river. The river was named after Sabrina so Locrine's betrayal of Guendolen would never be forgotten. According to legend, Sabrina lives in the river, which reflects her mood. She rides in a chariot and dolphins and salmon swim alongside her. The later story suggests that the legend of Sabrina could have become intermingled with old stories of a river goddess or nymph.

Fletcher refers to the legend in The Faithful Shepherdess (1608). Milton adopted the legend in his Comus (1634), using the Latin form Sabrina.

== Popularity ==
The use of Sabrina was very rare as a given name in Britain prior to the 19th century, with the singular exception of Sabrina Sidney (1757–1843), an English foundling girl, named for her orphanage overlooking River Severn. Its popularity rose, at first in the United States, following the release of the film Sabrina (1954), a romantic drama-comedy based on Samuel Taylor's Sabrina Fair, in which the protagonist Sabrina Fairchild was played by Audrey Hepburn. It was boosted by the popularity of the comic book character Sabrina the Teenage Witch, who debuted in 1962. Additional peaks in usage followed its use for characters on the American television series Charlie's Angels, which aired from 1976 to 1981, and Sabrina the Teenage Witch, based on the comic book character, which aired from 1996 to 2003.

It was the 789th most popular name for females born in the United States in 1954, and rose to the 245th most popular name in 1955, immediately following the release of the film Sabrina. According to Dunkling (1983), "[i]n the U.S. Sabrina has tended to displace Sabina since [the 1950s]."

The name had peaks in popularity in 1970 (rank 107) and 1977 (rank 63). The 1996 television series resulted in a renewed peak in 1997 (rank 53). The name was ranked as the 357th most popular name for American-born females in 2024. The name peaked in popularity in France in 1979–1981 (rank 8) and in Italy in 2001 (rank 35). In Germany, it peaked in popularity at rank 8 in 1987 and 1989.

== Women ==
=== Sabrina ===
- Sabrina Agresti-Roubache (born 1976), French film producer and politician
- Sabrina Ajmechet (born 1981), Argentine historian, professor and politician
- Sabrina Bartlett (born 1991), English actress
- Sabrina Benaim (born 1992), Canadian writer, performance artist and slam poet
- Sabrina Beneett, Malaysian beauty pageant titleholder
- Sabrina Botrán (born 2001), Guatemalan footballer
- Sabrina Brazzo (born 1968), Italian ballet dancer
- Sabrina Brier (born 1994), American actress and comedian
- Sabrina Bruce, American military officer and politician
- Sabrina Bryan (born 1984), American dancer, choreographer, actress and singer
- Sabrina Buljubašić (born 1988), Bosnian association football player
- Sabrina Calvo (born 1974), French writer
- Sabrina Carpenter (born 1999), American singer, songwriter and actress
- Sabrina Cass (born 2002), Brazilian freestyle skier
- Sabrina Cervantes (born 1987), American politician
- Sabrina Chairunnisa (born 1992), Indonesian model, actress, and YouTuber
- Sabrina Claudio (born 1996), Puerto Rican-Cuban-American singer
- Sabrina Crognale (born 1985), Italian modern pentathlete
- Sabrina Cruz (born 1998), Canadian YouTuber and producer
- Sabrina Custódia (born 1991), Brazilian para-cyclist
- Sabrina D'Angelo (born 1993), Canadian soccer player
- Sabrina Dawood, Pakistani philanthropist and educational activist
- Sabrina Delannoy (born 1986), French footballer
- Sabrina Dhawan, Indian screenwriter and producer
- Sabrina Dhowre (born 1989), Canadian model and media personality
- Sabrina Dornhoefer (born 1963), American middle-distance runner
- Sabrina Ebbersmeyer, German philosopher and professor
- Sabrina Enciso (born 1999), American soccer player
- Sabrina Erdely (born 1971/1972), American journalist and magazine reporter
- Sabrina Ferilli (born 1964), Italian actress
- Sabrina Filzmoser (born 1980), Austrian judoka
- Sabrina Flores (born 1996), Mexican professional footballer
- Sabrina Fortune (born 1997), British Paralympic athlete
- Sabrina Garciarena (born 1983), Argentine actress and model
- Sabrina Ghayour (born 1976), British-Iranian chef
- Sabrina Giusto (born 1971), Brazilian tennis player
- Sabrina Goleš (born 1965), Croatian tennis player
- Sabrina Gschwandtner (born 1977), American artist
- Sabrina Guinness (born 1955), British-Irish television producer
- Sabrina Harbec (born 1985), Canadian ice hockey player
- Sabrina Harman (born 1978), American soldier convicted of prisoner abuse
- Sabrina Cohen-Hatton (born 1983), British firefighter, psychologist and writer
- Sabrina Ho Chiu-yeng (born 1990), Hong Kong businesswoman, heiress and philanthropist
- Sabrina Impacciatore (born 1968), Italian actress
- Sabrina Ionescu (born 1997), American basketball player
- Sabrina Jackintell (1940–2012), American glider pilot
- Sabrina Jalees (born 1985), Canadian comedian
- Sabrina Jaquet (born 1987), Swiss badminton player
- Sabrina Johnston, American singer
- Sabrina Jonnier (born 1981), French downhill mountain biker
- Sabrina Kay, American entrepreneur, corporate board member, investor, and philanthropist
- Sabrina Kitaka, Ugandan physician
- Sabrina Kolker (born 1980), Canadian rower
- Sabrina Kruck (born 1981), German ice hockey player
- Sabrina Le Beauf (born 1958), American actress
- Sabrina Lloyd (born 1970), American actress
- Sabrina Lucchi (born 1968), Italian tennis player
- Sabrina Mahfouz, British-Egyptian poet
- Sabrina Malheiros (born 1979), Brazilian singer-songwriter
- Sabrina Man (born 2000), Filipino actress
- Sabrina Mar (born 1969 or 1970), American gymnast
- Sabrina Massialas (born 1997), American fencer
- Sabrina Matthews (born 1977), Canadian ballet choreographer
- Sabrina McKenna (born 1957), American judge
- Sabrina Ouazani (born 1988), French-Algerian actress
- Sabrina Gonzalez Pasterski (born 1993), American physicist
- Sabrina Petraglia (born 1983), Brazilian actress
- Sabrina Porshi (born 1996), Bangladeshi singer
- Sabrina Pretto (born 1985), Italian ballet dancer
- Sabrina P. Ramet (born 1949), American political scientist
- Sabrina Ricciardi (born 1968), Italian politician
- Sabrina Richard (born 1977), French weightlifter
- Sabrina Richter (born 1982), German handball player
- Sabrina Salerno (born 1968), Italian singer-songwriter, record producer, model, actress and television presenter
- Sabrina Santamaria (born 1993), American tennis player
- Sabrina Sato (born 1981), Brazilian television presenter
- Sabrina Scharf, American actress, lawyer, real estate developer, and activist
- Sabrina Seara (born 1985), Venezuelan telenovela actress
- Sabrina Sebaihi (born 1981), French politician
- Sabrina Sena (born 1985), Italian sport shooter
- Sabrina Setlur (born 1974), German rapper
- Sabrina Siani (born 1963), Italian actress
- Sabrina Sidney (1757–1843), British subject of a 'perfect wife' experiment by Thomas Day
- Sabrina Simader (born 1998), Kenyan alpine skier
- Sabrina Singh (born 1988), American government administrator
- Sabrina Sobhy (born 1996), American squash player
- Sabrina Sojourner (born 1952), American politician
- Sabrina Soussan (born 1969), French-German engineer
- Sabrina Starke (born 1979), Dutch singer-songwriter
- Sabrina S. Sutherland, American film producer
- Sabrina Tasselli (born 1990), Italian footballer
- Sabrina Tavernise (born 1971), American journalist
- Sabrina Thompson (born 1985), American aerospace engineer
- Sabrina Vannini (born 1971), Italian archer
- Sabrina Vega (born 1995), American gymnast
- Sabrina Viguier (born 1981), French footballer
- Sabrina Voinea (born 2007), Romanian artistic gymnast
- Sabrina Washington (born 1978), British singer
- Sabrina Wittmann (born 1991), German football coach
- Sabrina Wu (born 1997/1998), American comedian

Pseudonyms:

- Sabrina Jeffries, pen name of Deborah Gonzales (born 1958), American author
- Sabrina Sabrok, Argentine-Mexican model, pornographic actress and host Lorena Fabiana Colotta (born 1976)

=== Sabreena ===
- Sabreena McKinnon (born 2000), Australian rules footballer

== Fictional characters ==
- Hafren or Sabrina, a mythical nymph
- Sabrina, the Gym Leader of Saffron City in the Pokémon franchise, first appearing in 1996
- Sabrina, a recurring character in the sixth season of Pretty Little Liars
- Sabrina Adetiba, a fictional character from the British soap opera, Coronation Street
- Sabrina Duncan, played by Kate Jackson on the 1976 television series Charlie's Angels
- Sabrina Fairchild in Samuel A. Taylor's Sabrina Fair (1953), played by Audrey Hepburn in the 1954 adaptation Sabrina and by Julia Ormond in the 1995 remake
- Sabrina Costelana Newman, played by Raya Meddine in the American soap opera The Young and the Restless
- Sabrina Raincomprix, a character in the superhero animated TV series Miraculous: Tales of Ladybug & Cat Noir
- Sabrina Santiago, played by Teresa Castillo in the American soap opera General Hospital
- Sabrina Spellman, an Archie Comics character who debuted in 1962 and also starred in various television series

== See also ==
- Sabrina (disambiguation)
