= List of Guatemala women's international footballers =

This is a non-exhaustive list of Guatemala women's international footballers – association football players who have appeared at least once for the senior Guatemala women's national football team.

== Players ==
Key
**Bold**	Named to the national team in the past year

Name	Caps	Goals	National team years	Club(s)
**Gloria Aguilar**	9+	2+	–	(Guatemala) Unifut
Kimberly Albeño	6+	4+	2013–2019	Unknown
**Andrea Álvarez**	4+	3+	–	(Spain) Zaragoza CFF
Daniela Andrade	7+	0+	2010–2014	Unknown
**Marcela Anzueto**	1+	0+	–	(Guatemala) Unifut Rosal
**Ashley Ávalos**	0	0+	–	(Guatemala) Unifut
Diana Barrera	3+	0+	2014	
Jeniffer Barrios	1+	0+	2014	Unknown
Londy Barrios	16+	0+	2010–2014	Unknown
Sabrina Botrán	2+	0+	2019	(Spain) Madrid CFF
Shannon Brooks	5+	0+	2010–2012	Retired
**Jezmin Castellanos**	4+	0+	–	(Guatemala) Unifut
Stephanie Castellón	3+	0+	2010–2012	Retired
Mayuri Cayetano	3+	3+	2010–2014	Retired
Beberlin Clara	2+	0+	2019	Unknown
**Celsa Cruz**	2+	0+	–	(Guatemala) El Estor
Ángela Dávila	2+	0+	2019	(Guatemala) CDS Concepción
Alejandra de León	6+	0+	2011–2012	Retired
**Kimberly de León**	5+	0+	–	(Guatemala) Amatitlán
Mía Espino	3+	0+	2014	Unknown
**Alexia Estrada**	3	0	2022–	(United States) City College of San Francisco Rams
Noemy Franco	9+	0+	2014	(United States) MGA Women's Soccer
**Celeste Gatica**	2+	0+	–	(Guatemala) Unifut Rosal
**Fabiola González**	3+	0+	–	(Guatemala) Suchitepequez
Brithney Gutiérrez	0+	0+	2019	(Guatemala) Unifut
**Vivian Herrera**	6+	0+	–	(Guatemala) Unifut
**Emily Jiménez**	3+	0+	–	(Guatemala) Unifut
**Jaqueline Jolón**	3+	0+	–	(Guatemala) Municipal Femenino
Maricruz Lemus	11+	0+	2010–2013	Retired
Gloria Lohaiza	10+	1+	2010–2012	Retired
Cinthya López	18+	0+	2010–2013	Unknown
Vilma López	4+	1+	2013	Unknown
**Ana Lucía Martínez**	6+	1+	–	(Italy) Sampdoria
Didra Martínez	2+	0+	2019	Unknown
**Yuvitza Mayén**	7+	2+	–	(Guatemala) Unifut
Alma Méndez	2+	0+	2019	Unknown
Daniela Méndez	10+	2+	2010–2011	Retired
**Fabiola Montenegro**	2+	0+	–	(Guatemala) Pares
**María Monterroso**	7+	1+	–	(Spain) C. D Bajadoz Femenino
**Sofía Ovando**	4+	0+	–	(Guatemala) Suchitepequez
**Naylea Priego**	2+	0+	–	(Guatemala) Pares
**María Recinos**	1+	0+	–	(Guatemala) Unifut
**Beverly Reyes**	3+	0+	–	(Guatemala) Deportivo Xela
**Paola Solares**	2+	0+	–	(Guatemala) CSD Concepción
**Aisha Solórzano**	7+	0+	–	Unattached
**Daniela Sosa**	1+	0+	–	(Guatemala) CSD Concepción
**Elisa Texaj**	4+	0+	–	(Guatemala) Unifut Rosal
**Lesly Ventura**	4+	0+	–	(Guatemala) Cobaneras

== See also ==
- Guatemala women's national football team
