= Susan James (philosopher) =

British philosopher (born 1951)

Susan James FBA (born 1951) is a British professor of philosophy at Birkbeck College London. She has previously taught at the University of Connecticut and the University of Cambridge. She is well known for her work on the history of seventeenth and eighteenth century philosophy.

== Education and career ==
Susan James received her BA, MA and Ph.D. degrees in Philosophy from New Hall (now Murray Edwards College), University of Cambridge. She was Assistant Professor in the Department of Philosophy at the University of Connecticut for two years before she returned to Cambridge, first as the Kathryn Jex Blake Research Fellow at Girton College and then as Lecturer in the Faculty of Philosophy. She joined Birkbeck College in 2000 as Anniversary Reader, and became Professor of Philosophy in 2002. She was Chair of the Faculty of Philosophy in Cambridge from 1997–9 and then of the Birkbeck Philosophy Department in 2003–6. She is married and has two children.

She has held a number of Research Fellowships: from the British Academy and Leverhulme Foundation in 1994–5; at the Humanities Research Centre and Research School of Social Science, Australian National University (1994); at the Hebrew University of Jerusalem (1998); at the Wissenschaftskolleg zu Berlin (2003–04); at the Centre for Human Values, Princeton University (2013–14); and at the Berkeley UC School of Law (2019). She has also held a number of Visiting Professorships: she was the John Findlay Visiting Professor at the Department of Philosophy, Boston University in 2008; the Kohut Visiting Professor at the University of Chicago in 2017; and an Associate Member of the Department of Comparative Thought and Literature, Johns Hopkins University (2015–18). She was President of the Aristotelian Society in 2015–16 and was elected a Fellow of the British Academy in 2019.

== Philosophical work ==
Susan James has published seven books and more than 50 journal articles, ranging over the history of seventeenth and eighteenth century philosophy, political and social philosophy, and feminist philosophy. Much of her research considers how early modern metaphysics, epistemology, psychology, political philosophy and ethics were thought to contribute to the overall project of living well. Passion and Action: The Emotions in Seventeenth-Century Philosophy (1997) concentrates on the role of the passions in early modern conceptions of the good life. In her work on Margaret Cavendish, James explores Cavendish’s efforts to blend philosophical insight and fantasy into a productive form of self-understanding. Two books on Spinoza, Spinoza on Philosophy, Religion and Politics (2012) and Spinoza on learning to Live Together (2020) range over the religious, epistemological, political and ethical aspects of a philosophical way of life.

Throughout her work, Susan James tries to bring the history of philosophy into conversation with its contemporary counterpart. Her historical studies aim to illuminate contemporary philosophical problems.

== Bibliography ==
=== Books ===
- Spinoza on Learning to Live Together (Oxford University Press, 2020).
- Spinoza on Philosophy, Religion and Politics: The "Theologico-Political Treatise", x + 348pp., Oxford University Press, 2012. Paperback edition 2014; e-book at Oxford Philosophy Online.
- The Political Writings of Margaret Cavendish, edited with an Introduction and critical apparatus. Cambridge Texts in the History of Political Thought, xxxix + 298pp. Cambridge University Press, 2003.
- Visible Women: Essays in Legal Theory and Political Philosophy co-edited with Stephanie Palmer, vii + 195pp., Hart Publishing, 2002.
- Passion and Action: The Emotions in Early Modern Philosophy, viii + 318pp., Oxford: The Clarendon Press, 1997. Paperback edition 1999; e-book at Oxford Philosophy Online. Chinese translation, Commercial Press Beijing, 2017.
- Beyond Equality and Difference, co-edited with Gisela Bock, vii + 210pp., London: Routledge, 1999.
- The Content of Social Explanation, viii + 192pp., Cambridge University Press, 1984. Paperback edition 2009.

=== Journal articles and book chapters ===
- ‘Emotional Responses to Fiction. A Spinozist Approach’ in Anthony O’Hear ed. Emotions, The Royal Institute of Philosophy Supplement 85 (Cambridge University Press, 2019).
- ‘Politically Mediated Affects. Envy in Spinoza’s Tractatus Politicus in Yitzhak Melamed and Hasana Sharpe eds., A Critical Guide to Spinoza’s Tractatus Politicus (Cambridge University Press, 2018).
- ‘Mixt natures which I call hermaphroditical: Margaret Cavendish on the Natures of Things’ in Emily Thomas ed., Early Modern Women on Metaphysics, Religion and Science, (Cambridge University Press, 2018).
- ‘A Virtuous Practice: Descartes on Scientific Activity’ in Descartes and Cartesianism ed. Stephen Gaukroger and Catherine Wilson (Oxford University Press, 2017).
- ‘Why Should we Read Spinoza?’ in The History of Philosophy, Royal Institute of Philosophy Supplement 79, edited by Anthony O'Hear (Cambridge University Press, 2016).
- ‘Mary Wollstonecraft’s Conception of Rights’ in Sandrine Berges and Alan Coffee eds., The Social and Political Thought of Mary Wollstonecraft (Oxford University Press, 2016).
- ‘Wanting to Understand: Spinoza on Fortitudo’ in Spinoza Research: To Be Continued, Uitgeverij Spinozahuis, 2016.
- ‘Spinoza on the Passionate Dimension of Philosophical Reasoning’ in Sabrina Ebbersmeyer ed., Emotional Minds. The Passions and the Limits of Pure Inquiry in Early Modern Philosophy (de Gruyter, 2012).
- ‘When Does Truth Matter? Spinoza on the Relation between Theology and Philosophy’, European Journal of Philosophy’, vol. 20:1 (2012), 91-108.
- ‘Creating Rational Understanding: Spinoza as a Social Epistemologist’, Aristotelian Society Supplementary Volume, vol. 85:1 (2011), 181-199.
- ‘Politics and the Progress of Sentiments’ in Randall E. Auxier and Lewis Edwin Hahn eds., The Philosophy of Richard Rorty, The Library of Living Philosophers vol. XXXII (Open Court, 2010).
- ‘Freedom, Slavery and the Passions’ in Olli Koistinen ed., The Cambridge Companion to Spinoza’s‘Ethics’ (Cambridge University Press, 2009).
- ‘Law and Sovereignty in Spinoza’s Politics’ in Moira Gatens ed., Feminist Interpretations of Spinoza (Pennsylvania State University Press, 2009).
- ‘Democracy and the Good Life in Spinoza’s Philosophy’ in Charlie Huenemann ed., Interpreting Spinoza (Cambridge University Press, 2008).
- ‘Spinoza on Superstition. Coming to Terms with Fear’, Mededelingen Vanwege het Spinozahuis 88, 2006.
- ‘The Passions and the Good Life’ in Donald Rutherford ed., The Cambridge Companion to Early Modern Philosophy (Cambridge University Press, 2006).
- ‘Sympathy and Comparison: Two Principles of Human Nature’ in M. Frasca-Spada and P. J. E. Kail eds., Impressions of Hume(Oxford University Press, 2005).
- ‘Spinoza and Materialism’ in Stephen H. Daniel ed., Current Continental Theory and Modern Philosophy (Northwestern University Press, 2005).
- ‘The Passions and Political Philosophy’ in Anthony Hatzimoysis ed. Philosophy and the Emotions (Cambridge University Press, 2003).
- ‘Freedom and the Imaginary’ in Susan James and Stephanie Palmer eds., Visible Women. Essays on Feminist Legal Theory and Political Philosophy (Hart Publishing Ltd., 2002).
- ‘Feminism’ in Routledge Encyclopaedia of Philosophy ed. Edward Craig, Routledge, 2000. Updated version reprinted in The Shorter Routledge Encyclopaedia of Philosophy, 2005.
- ‘Desires, Passions and the Explanation of Action’ in Stephen Gaukroger ed., The Soft Underbelly of Reason (Routledge, 1998).
- ‘The Passions in Metaphysics and the Philosophy of Action’ in Daniel Garber and Michael Ayers eds., The Cambridge History of Seventeenth-Century Philosophy (Cambridge University Press, 1998), vol. I.
- ‘Power and Difference: Spinoza's Conception of Freedom’, The Journal of Political Philosophy, 4:3 (1996), 207–28.
- ‘Spinoza the Stoic’ in Tom Sorell ed., The Rise of Modern Philosophy (Oxford University Press, 1993).
- ‘Certain and Less Certain Knowledge’ in Proceedings of the Aristotelian Society 87 (1987), 227–42. Reprinted in Vere Chappell ed. Grotius to Gassendi.
- ‘The Duty to Relieve Suffering’ Ethics 93:1 (1982), 4–21. Reprinted in Cass Sunstein ed., Feminism and Political Theory (Chicago University Press, 1990).
