= Spross =

Spross is a surname. Notable people with the surname include:

- Ana Lucía Spross (born 1982), Guatemalan footballer and manager
- Silvia Spross (born 1988), Swiss-born American actress
