= Football at the 2011 Pan American Games – Women's tournament =

Women's football tournament at the 2011 Pan American Games
- Venue: Estadio Omnilife
- Dates: October 18 – 27
- Competitors: 143 from 8 nations

Medalists
| Gold medal | Canada |
| Silver medal | Brazil |
| Bronze medal | Mexico |

The women's association football tournament at the 2011 Pan American Games was held in Guadalajara, Mexico at the Estadio Omnilife from October 18 to October 27. Associations affiliated with FIFA that qualified were invited to send their full women's national teams.

For these Games, the women competed in an 8-team tournament, which is a drop from 10 at the 2007 games. The defending champions are Brazil, who won the title on home field.

== Teams ==
=== Qualification ===
A National Olympic Committee may enter one women's team for the football competition. Mexico, the host nation and Canada (automatic qualification) along with six other countries qualified through regional competitions.

| Event | Date | Location | Vacancies | Qualified |
|---|---|---|---|---|
| Host Nation | – | – | 1 | Mexico |
| Qualified automatically | – | – | 1 | Canada |
| Central American and Caribbean qualifying tournament | October 28 – November 8, 2010 | Mexico | 2 | Costa Rica; Trinidad and Tobago |
| South American qualifying tournament | November 4–21, 2010 | Ecuador | 4 | Brazil; Colombia; Chile; Argentina |
| TOTAL | | | 8 | |

- The highest finisher from each the Caribbean and Central American regions qualified.

=== Squads ===
The women's tournament is a full international tournament with no restrictions on age. Each nation must submit a squad of 18 players September 2011. A minimum of two goalkeepers (plus one optional alternate goalkeeper) must be included in the squad.

- Argentina
- Brazil
- Canada
- Chile
- Colombia
- Costa Rica
- Mexico
- Trinidad and Tobago

== Format ==
- Eight teams are split into 2 preliminary round groups of 4 teams each. The top 2 teams from each group qualify for the knockout stage.
- The third and fourth placed teams are eliminated from the competition.
- In the semifinals, the matchups are as follows: A1 vs. B2 and B1 vs. A2
- The winning teams from the semifinals play for the gold medal. The losing teams compete for the bronze medal.

== Draw ==
The draw for the tournament was held at the offices of CONCACAF in New York City, United States. The draw was conducted by CONCACAF Deputy General Secretary Ted Howard. The seeding information was not provided, rather the results of the draw were given.

- Team (World ranking as of July 2011)

| Group A | Group B |
|---|---|
| Mexico (22); Colombia (29); Trinidad and Tobago (48); Chile (44) | Brazil (3); Canada (9); Costa Rica (42); Argentina (34) |

== Preliminary round ==
All times are local Central Daylight Time (UTC−5)

=== Group A ===
| Pos | Team | Pld | W | D | L | GF | GA | GD | Pts | Qualification |
|---|---|---|---|---|---|---|---|---|---|---|
| 1 | Colombia | 3 | 2 | 0 | 1 | 2 | 1 | +1 | 6 | Advance to Semifinals |
| 2 | Mexico | 3 | 1 | 2 | 0 | 2 | 1 | +1 | 5 | Advance to Semifinals |
| 3 | Chile | 3 | 1 | 1 | 1 | 3 | 1 | +2 | 4 | |
| 4 | Trinidad and Tobago | 3 | 0 | 1 | 2 | 1 | 5 | −4 | 1 | |

October 18, 2011
14:00

| Colombia | 1–0 | Trinidad and Tobago |
|---|---|---|
| Andrade 18' | Report |

Estadio Omnilife, Guadalajara
Attendance: 3,548
Referee: Salomé di Iorio (Argentina)

October 18, 2011
21:00

| Mexico | 0–0 | Chile |
|---|---|---|
| | Report |

Estadio Omnilife, Guadalajara
Attendance: 9,235
Referee: Diane Ferreiras (Guyana)

October 20, 2011
14:00

| Chile | 0–1 | Colombia |
|---|---|---|
| | Report | Rincón 3' |

Estadio Omnilife, Guadalajara
Attendance: 4,204
Referee: Lucila Venegas (Mexico)

October 20, 2011
20:00

| Mexico | 1–1 | Trinidad and Tobago |
|---|---|---|
| Dominguez 42' (pen.) | Report | Attin-Johnson 21' |

Estadio Omnilife, Guadalajara
Attendance: 9,168
Referee: Irasema Aguilera (Cuba)

October 22, 2011
10:00

| Trinidad and Tobago | 0–3 | Chile |
|---|---|---|
| | Report | Lara 18'; Mardones 40'; Rojas 65' |

Estadio Omnilife, Guadalajara
Attendance: 5,900
Referee: Salomé di Iorio (Argentina)

October 22, 2011
17:00

| Mexico | 1–0 | Colombia |
|---|---|---|
| Pérez 2' | Report |

Estadio Omnilife, Guadalajara
Attendance: 13,833
Referee: Yesli Rivas (El Salvador)

=== Group B ===
| Pos | Team | Pld | W | D | L | GF | GA | GD | Pts | Qualification |
|---|---|---|---|---|---|---|---|---|---|---|
| 1 | Brazil | 3 | 2 | 1 | 0 | 4 | 1 | +3 | 7 | Advance to Semifinals |
| 2 | Canada | 3 | 2 | 1 | 0 | 4 | 1 | +3 | 7 | Advance to Semifinals |
| 3 | Costa Rica | 3 | 0 | 1 | 2 | 5 | 8 | −3 | 1 | |
| 4 | Argentina | 3 | 0 | 1 | 2 | 3 | 6 | −3 | 1 | |

October 18, 2011
11:00

| Canada | 3–1 | Costa Rica |
|---|---|---|
| Julien 30'; Sinclair 51'; Pietrangelo 82' | Report | Cruz 28' (pen.) |

Estadio Omnilife, Guadalajara
Attendance: 3,380
Referee: Shane de Silva (Trinidad and Tobago)

October 18, 2011
17:00

| Argentina | 0–2 | Brazil |
|---|---|---|
| | Report | Guedes 27'; Daniele 37' |

Estadio Omnilife, Guadalajara
Attendance: 5,967
Referee: Lucila Venegas (Mexico)

October 20, 2011
10:00

| Canada | 1–0 | Argentina |
|---|---|---|
| Julien 48' | Report |

Estadio Omnilife, Guadalajara
Attendance: 4,204
Referee: Yesli Rivas (El Salvador)

October 20, 2011
17:00

| Brazil | 2–1 | Costa Rica |
|---|---|---|
| Débora 59'; Guedes 62' | Report | Cruz 90+5' |

Estadio Omnilife, Guadalajara
Attendance: 6,837
Referee: Diane Ferreiras (Guyana)

October 22, 2011
13:00

| Costa Rica | 3–3 | Argentina |
|---|---|---|
| Acosta 67'; Rodríguez 75'; Alvarado 82' | Report | Pereyra 5'; Vallejos 8'; Ugalde 16' (o.g.) |

Estadio Omnilife, Guadalajara
Attendance: 6,417
Referee: Shane de Silva (Trinidad and Tobago)

October 22, 2011
20:00

| Brazil | 0–0 | Canada |
|---|---|---|
| | Report |

Estadio Omnilife, Guadalajara
Attendance: 16,316
Referee: Irasema Aguilera (Cuba)
- A drawing of lots was used to separate Canada and Brazil after they were tied on every tiebreaker. Brazil won the draw.

== Knockout stage ==
Semi-finals
25 October – Guadalajara
Brazil | 1
Mexico | 0
25 October – Guadalajara
Colombia | 1
Canada | 2

Final
27 October – Guadalajara
Brazil | 1 (3)
Canada (pen.) | 1 (4)
Third place
27 October – Guadalajara
Mexico (a.e.t.) | 1
Colombia | 0

=== Semifinals ===
October 25, 2011
17:00

| Mexico | 0–1 | Brazil |
|---|---|---|
| | Report | Maurine 79' |

Estadio Omnilife, Guadalajara
Attendance: 19,770
Referee: Irasema Aguilera (Cuba)

October 25, 2011
20:00

| Colombia | 1–2 | Canada |
|---|---|---|
| Usme 83' | Report | Kyle 48'; Gayle 88' |

Estadio Omnilife, Guadalajara
Attendance: 20,966
Referee: Salomé di Iorio (Argentina)

=== Bronze-medal match ===
October 27, 2011
14:00

| Mexico | 1–0 (a.e.t.) | Colombia |
|---|---|---|
| Ruiz 100' | Report |

Estadio Omnilife, Guadalajara
Attendance: 31,408
Referee: Yesli Rivas (El Salvador)

=== Gold-medal match ===
October 27, 2011
17:45

| Brazil | 1–1 (a.e.t.) | Canada |
|---|---|---|
| Débora 4' | Report | Sinclair 87' |
Penalties
| Alberto (penalty scored); Maurine (penalty scored); Nascimento (penalty missed); Wiggers (penalty scored); Débora (penalty missed) | 3–4 | (penalty scored) Matheson; (penalty scored) Sinclair; (penalty scored) Booth; (penalty scored) Schmidt; (penalty missed) Chapman |

Estadio Omnilife, Guadalajara
Attendance: 33,614
Referee: Diane Ferreiras (Guyana)

Team details

Brazil
Canada

| GK | 1 | Bárbara |
| DF | 2 | Maurine |
| DF | 13 | Karen Rocha |
| DF | 4 | Tânia Maria |
| DF | 15 | Maycon |
| MF | 5 | Daiane Rodrigues |
| MF | 6 | Rosana | (substituted off) a' |
| MF | 7 | Francielle |
| MF | 8 | Formiga |
| FW | 17 | Debinha |
| FW | 11 | Thaisinha | (substituted off) b' |
Substitutes:
| FW | 16 | Ketlen | (substituted on) a' |
| FW | | Grazielle | (substituted on) b' |
Manager:
(Brazil) Kleiton Lima

| GK | 1 | Karina LeBlanc |
| DF | 5 | Robyn Gayle | (substituted off) a' |
| DF | 14 | Lauren Sesselmann | (substituted off) b' |
| DF | 9 | Candace Chapman |
| DF | 16 | Shannon Woeller |
| MF | 8 | Diana Matheson |
| MF | 2 | Kelly Parker |
| MF | 6 | Kaylyn Kyle | (substituted off) c' |
| FW | 11 | Desiree Scott |
| FW | 12 | Christine Sinclair |
| FW | 10 | Christina Julien |
Substitutes:
| DF | 7 | Rhian Wilkinson | (substituted on) a' |
| MF | 3 | Melanie Booth | (substituted on) b' |
| MF | 13 | Sophie Schmidt | (substituted on) c' |
Manager:
(England) John Herdman

2011 Pan American Games Women's football tournament
Winners

Canada
1st title

== Goalscorers ==
2 goals

- (Costa Rica) Shirley Cruz
- (Canada) Christine Sinclair
- (Canada) Christina Julien
- (Brazil) Débora de Oliveira
- (Brazil) Thais Guedes

1 goals

- (Brazil) Daniele Batista
- (Brazil) Maurine
- (Mexico) Maribel Domínguez
- (Mexico) Verónica Pérez
- (Mexico) Jennifer Ruiz
- (Costa Rica) Wendy Acosta
- (Costa Rica) Raquel Rodríguez
- (Costa Rica) Katherine Alvarado
- (Canada) Kaylyn Kyle
- (Canada) Robyn Gayle
- (Canada) Amelia Pietrangelo
- (Colombia) Lady Andrade
- (Colombia) Yoreli Rincón
- (Colombia) Catalina Usme
- (Trinidad and Tobago) Maylee Attin-Johnson
- (Chile) Francisca Lara
- (Chile) Francisca Mardones
- (Chile) María José Rojas
- (Argentina) Mercedes Pereyra
- (Argentina) Fabiana Vallejos

1 own goal

- (Costa Rica) Marianne Ugalde (playing against Argentina)

== Medalists ==
| Event | Gold | Silver | Bronze |
|---|---|---|---|
| Women's football | Canada; Rachelle Beanlands; Melanie Booth; Candace Chapman; Robyn Gayle; Christina Julien; Kaylyn Kyle; Karina LeBlanc; Vanessa Legault-Cordisco; Diana Matheson; Kelly Parker; Sophie Schmidt; Desiree Scott; Lauren Sesselmann; Diamond Simpson; Christine Sinclair; Brittany Timko; Rhian Wilkinson; Shannon Woeller | Brazil; Francielle Alberto; Rosana Augusto; Bárbara Barbosa; Daniele Batista; Renata Costa; Débora de Oliveira; Maurine Gonçalves; Thaís Guedes; Beatriz Zaneratto João; Miraildes Mota; Grazielle Nascimento; Tânia Ribeiro; Thaís Picarte; Karen Rocha; Daiane Rodrigues; Andréia Suntaque; Renata Diniz; Ketlen Wiggers | Mexico; Aurora Santiago; Erika Venegas; Kenti Robles; Rubí Sandoval; Jennifer Ruiz; Valeria Miranda; Mónica Vergara; Marylin Díaz; Luz del Rosario Saucedo; Stephany Mayor; Guadalupe Worbis; Dinora Garza; Liliana Mercado; Liliana Godoy; Verónica Pérez; Maribel Domínguez; Mónica Ocampo; Tanya Samarzich |

== Final standings ==
| Rank | Team | Record |
|---|---|---|
| Gold medal | Canada | 3–2–0 |
| Silver medal | Brazil | 3–2–0 |
| Bronze medal | Mexico | 2–2–1 |
| 4 | Colombia | 2–0–3 |
| 5 | Chile | 1–1–1 |
| 6 | Costa Rica | 0–1–2 |
| 7 | Argentina | 0–1–2 |
| 8 | Trinidad and Tobago | 0–1–2 |
