= Arianna Romero =

Mexican footballer (born 1992)

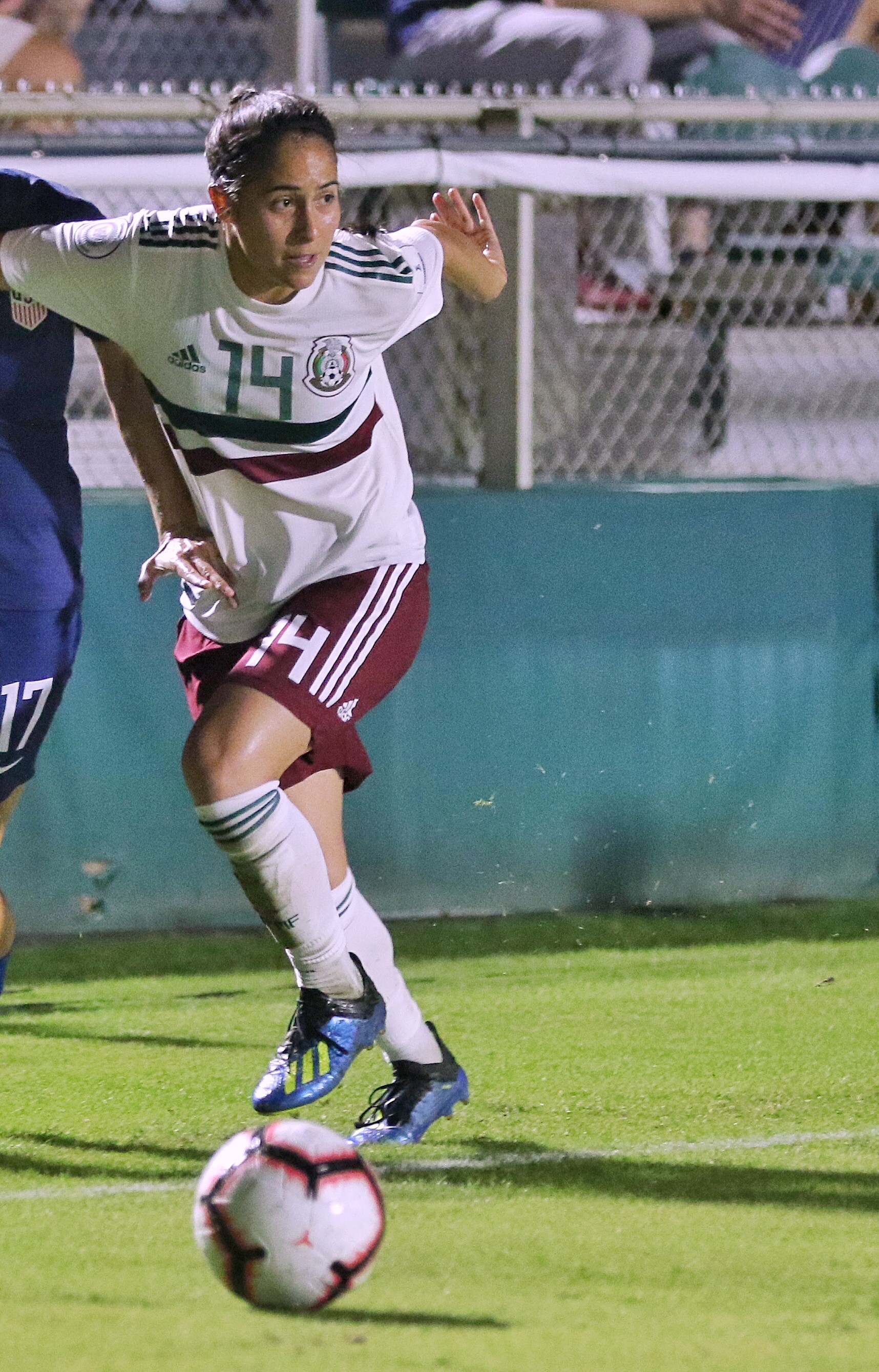
- Romero with Mexico at the 2018 CONCACAF Championship

Personal information
- Full name: Arianna Jeanette Romero Téllez
- Date of birth: 29 July 1992 (age 34)
- Place of birth: Glendale, Arizona, United States
- Height: 1.61 m (5 ft 3 in)
- Positions: Central defender; fullback

Youth career
- Sereno SC

College career
Years	Team	Apps	(Gls)
2010–2013	Nebraska Cornhuskers	77	(2)

Senior career*
Years	Team	Apps	(Gls)
2014	Houston Dash	21	(0)
2015	Washington Spirit	0	(0)
2016	ÍBV	18	(0)
2016–2017	Perth Glory	14	(0)
2017	Vålerenga	8	(0)
2018	Valur	17	(0)
2019	Houston Dash	10	(0)
2019–2020	Perth Glory	11	(0)
2020	North Carolina Courage	1	(0)
2021–2022	HB Køge	3	(0)

International career^{‡}
2012	Mexico U-20	9	(0)
2011–2018	Mexico	47	(1)
Medal record
Representing Mexico
CONCACAF Women's U-20 Championship
Silver medal – second place	2010 Guatemala	Team
Bronze medal – third place	2012 Panama	Team
- * Club domestic league appearances and goals as of 29 April 2020 ‡ National team caps and goals as of 18 June 2015

Arianna Jeanette Romero Téllez (born 29 July 1992) is an American-born Mexican footballer who plays as a central defender or a fullback.

== Youth and collegiate career ==
=== Youth ===
Romero did not participate in high school soccer at her alma mater, Willow Canyon High School. Instead, she played club soccer in Phoenix, Arizona for Sereno SC under Coach Dave Simeone. As a midfielder/defender, she helped the Sereno 92 Golden Eagles to eight state championships and three Region IV semifinal appearances. Additionally, her squad won 13 tournament titles and was a finalist at the Disney College Showcase. Individually, Romero was on the 2009 Arizona Olympic Development Program team that advanced to the semifinals of the Region IV Championship.

=== College ===
Romero attended the University of Nebraska–Lincoln where she played as a defender for the Cornhuskers. As a freshman, she started all 21 games and helped the team record five shutouts. She scored one goal and served three assists. Romero scored the first goal of her career in a match against Texas Tech University in October 2010. The game-winning goal helped the Cornhuskers win in overtime.

During her sophomore season, Romero started every game, scored one goal, and served two assists from the defensive line. On 2 September 2011, she scored her second career goal, served two assists and produced a career-high four points during the team's 6–0 defeat of the Arkansas Razorbacks. As a junior, Romero missed the first five games of the 2012 season while playing for the Mexico National Under-20 Football Team at the FIFA U-20 Women's World Cup in Japan. After her return from the tournament, she started the final 15 games of the season and was part of a defensive unit that posted three shutouts during the season.

During her final year with the Huskers in 2013, Romero led the defensive line as a center back and helped the team record eight shutouts. She was named Second-Team NSCAA All-America, became the 12th Husker All-American, and was awarded Nebraska's NSCAA All-America award. The NSCAA All-Region First Team honoree and Big Ten Defender of the Year finished her career having started in all 77 of her career matches.

== Club career ==
In January 2014, Romero joined Seattle Reign FC as part of the 2014 NWSL Player Allocation. Later the same month, she was selected by expansion team, Houston Dash during the 2014 NWSL Expansion Draft.

On 2 December 2014, Romero was traded by Houston to the Washington Spirit.

In March 2016, she was acquired by Seattle Reign FC.

In October 2016, she joined Perth Glory as an international player.

Romero spent 2018 with Valur in the Úrvalsdeild kvenna in Iceland, she made 17 appearances with the team.

On 4 March 2019, Romero signed with the Houston Dash, returning to the team she had played with in 2014. On 17 June 2020, Romero was waived.

On 9 September 2020, Romero signed a short-term contract with the North Carolina Courage.

== International career ==
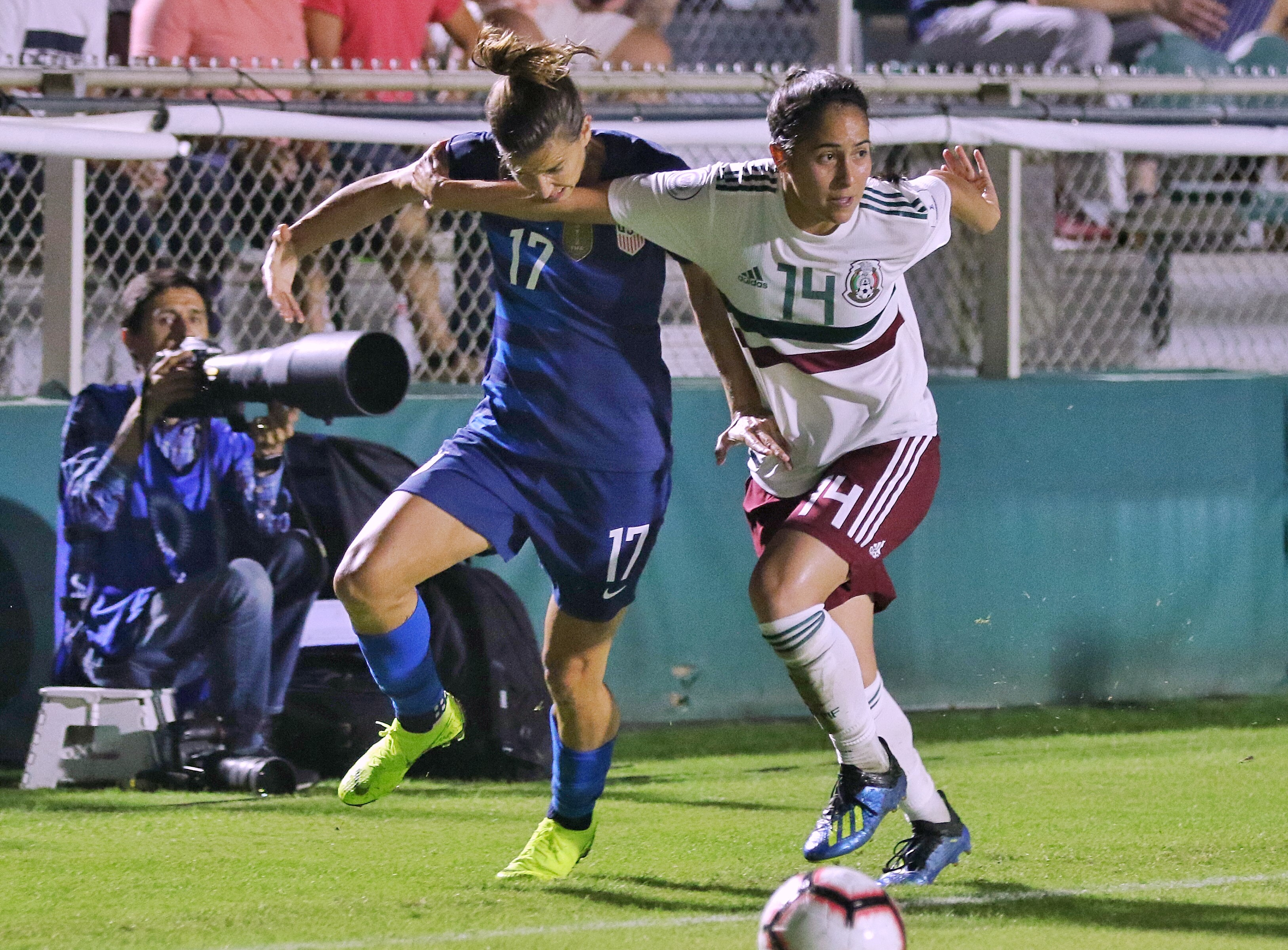
Romero (right) fighting for the ball in a match between the United States and Mexico at the 2018 CONCACAF Championship

After taking part in a training camp with the Mexico Under-20 National Team in July 2011, Romero was selected to be part of the Mexico National Team that competed at the CONCACAF Women's Olympic Qualifying Tournament in Vancouver, British Columbia, in January 2012. She was also on the Mexico U-20 team that competed at the CONCACAF Championships in Panama City, Panama, in February 2012. Romero started all four of Mexico's games at the tournament, playing 360 minutes. She helped Mexico reach the quarterfinals for the second time at the 16-team tournament.

In the spring of 2013, Romero played in the Algarve Cup with the Mexico National team in Portugal. Mexico was one of 12 countries invited to the tournament and started in group play with Hungary, Wales and Portugal. Romero played in three of Mexico's four games, including a start against Wales during group play. Mexico won their group with a pair of wins over Hungary (1–0) and Portugal (3–0), which placed them in the seventh-place game at the tournament but lost to Denmark 3–0. Mexico played in the tournament for just the third time in tournament history and the first time since 2006.

Romero was one of four collegians to be called up for Mexico's women's nationally televised international friendly against the United States of America in Washington, D.C. at RFK Stadium on Tuesday, 3 Sept.. Romero started and played the entire match on a young back line for Mexico.

== Personal life ==
Romero is the daughter of José Romero and Carmen Téllez and has one brother, Cristian.

== See also ==
- List of Mexican Fútbol (soccer) athletes
- List of foreign W-League (Australia) players
- List of foreign NWSL players
- 2012 CONCACAF Under-20 Women's Championship squads
