= Football at the 2010 Central American and Caribbean Games =

2010 Football at the Central American and Caribbean Games
- 2010 Central American and Caribbean Games

Tournament details
- Host country: Venezuela
- Teams: 10 (from 2 confederations)
- Venue: Estadio Metropolitano de Merida

The Association football competition at the 2010 Central American and Caribbean Games were set to start 21 July, although qualification took take place beforehand. All participants had to be born on or after 1 January 1989. On 13 July 2010, the organizing committee for the games (Comaz) announced that the event would not be held because CONCACAF had threatened to sanction countries that participated.

== Preliminary round ==
The preliminary round was contested by some CONCACAF teams that determined the qualified teams to the 2010 Central American and Caribbean Games. Six teams were drawn into three match ups that were contested in a two-legged tie. The first leg of each of the preliminary round match ups was played on 21 March 2010, and the second leg was played on 27–28 March. Costa Rica did not participate in the first part, being the strongest team, they got an automatic spot into an extra playoff series against the best losing team of the two-legged series. Nicaragua, having the best result, played against Costa Rica. All seven Central American associations took part of the qualifying process.

Team 1	Agg.	Team 2	1st leg	2nd leg
Guatemala	0–3	Panama	0–0	0–3
Honduras	0–1	El Salvador	0–1	0–0
Belize	2–2 (a)	Nicaragua	1–0	1–2
Extra Playoff
Costa Rica	12–1	Nicaragua	6–1	6–0

=== Matches ===
==== First legs ====
21 March 2010

Guatemala	0–0	Panama

Estadio Mario Camposeco, Quetzaltenango, Guatemala
Attendance: 1,554
Referee: Elmer Bonilla (El Salvador)

21 March 2010
17:00 (UTC−06)

Honduras	0–1	El Salvador
		Gutiérrez 51'

Estadio Roberto Martínez Avila, Siguatepeque, Honduras
Attendance: 1,450
Referee: Luis Rodríguez (Panama)

21 March 2010

Belize	1–0	Nicaragua
West 27'

FFB Field, Belmopan, Belize
Attendance: 2,000
Referee: Marlon Mejía (El Salvador)

==== Second legs ====
27 March 2010
16:00 (UTC−06)

Panama	3–0	Guatemala
Godoy 61'; Davis 87'; Blackburn 88'

Estadio San Cristóbal, David, Panama
Attendance: 2,500
Referee: José Pineda (Honduras)
- Panama won 3–0 on aggregate.

28 March 2010
15:00 (UTC−06)

El Salvador	0–0	Honduras

Estadio Cuscatlán, San Salvador, El Salvador
Attendance: 6,700
Referee: Walter López (Guatemala)
- El Salvador won 1–0 on aggregate.

28 March 2010

Nicaragua	2–1	Belize
Portocarrero 41', 56'		Maldonado 19'

Dennis Martínez National Stadium, Managua, Nicaragua
Attendance: 3,000
Referee: Hugo Cruz (Costa Rica)
- Belize 2–2 Nicaragua on aggregate. Belize won on away goals.

==== Playoff ====
11 April 2010

Costa Rica	6–1	Nicaragua
Madrigal 7', 34', 44'; Mena 58'; Blanco 64'; Estrada 80'		Reyes 54'

Estadio José Rafael Fello Meza Ivankovich, Cartago, Costa Rica
Attendance: 1,500
Referee: Juan Amaya (Panama)

18 April 2010

Nicaragua	0–6	Costa Rica
		Guevara 9', 41'; Gamboa 18'; Madrigal 57'; Castro 61', 78'

Dennis Martínez National Stadium, Managua, Nicaragua
Attendance: 600
Referee: Oscar Moncada (Honduras)
- Costa Rica won 12–1 on aggregate.

== Statistics ==
=== Goalscorers ===
There were 21 goals scored in 8 matches, for an average of 2.62 goals per match.

4 goals

- (Costa Rica) Diego Madrigal

2 goals

- (Costa Rica) Allen Guevara
- (Costa Rica) Alejandro Castro
- (Nicaragua) Jorge Portocarrero

1 goal

- (Belize) Clifton West
- (Belize) Julián Maldonado
- (Costa Rica) José Mena
- (Costa Rica) Ricardo Blanco
- (Costa Rica) Diego Estrada
- (Costa Rica) Cristian Gamboa
- (Nicaragua) Daniel Reyes
- (El Salvador) Isidro Gutiérrez
- (Panama) Aníbal Godoy
- (Panama) Eric Davis
- (Panama) Rolando Blackburn

== Final tournament ==
=== Venues ===
Mayagüez	Cabo Rojo	Aguada
Mayagüez Athletics Stadium	Pista Atletica Relín Sosa	Estadio de Aguada
18.193°N 67.155°W	18.079°N 67.148°W	18.378°N 67.197°W
Capacity: 12,000	Capacity: 3,000	Capacity: 4,000

== CONCACAF controversy ==
On 6 July 2010, ten days before the games started, CONCACAF withdrew their support of the tournament stating that the tournament facilities allegedly do not meet the "minimum standards required to conduct an international tournament." They did not announce or inform this directly to the organizing committee, instead it was through the Costa Rica Football Federation's Web Page. A few weeks before this announcement Concacaf officials had visited the installations and given them praise.

More than $750,000 was invested in preparing the Pista Atletica Relín Sosa and the Estadio de Aguada by Administración del Financiamiento para la Infraestructura and the Municipalities of Aguada and Cabo Rojo. Concacaf inspectors had gone to Puerto Rico in April and noted that there were some problems with the Aguada Stadium. In response AFI invested $500,000: it was painted, new grass was installed and other improvements were made. The officials also mentioned deficiencies in the dressing rooms, and the Cabo Rojo government invested $250,000.

At first the Mayagüez 2010 organizing committee intended to hold the football events, with or without Concacaf. Felipe Perez, president of the Organizing Committee and Hector Cardona, president of Odecabe, were going to travel to Trinidad and Tobago to meet with Jack Warner, president of Concacaf on 9 July 2010. Yet the meeting was canceled since the Concacaf stated that their decision was final. The Organizing Committee offered various options including moving some of the games to the Juan Ramón Loubriel Stadium and asked the Concacaf to reconsider its position, to no avail.

On 13 July 2010 Felipe Perez announced that the event would not be held because CONCACAF had threatened to sanction countries that participated. Some of the possible sanctions were the teams accreditation by Concacaf and ending economic helps. Comaz never received any written or official indication from Concacaf about the non-celebration of the games. Felipe Perez stated that Comaz would take their complaint to FIFA. He also stated that the Puerto Rico national football team would participate in the opening ceremony with the Puerto Rico delegation.

More than 4,000 tickets had already been sold for the events. On 14 July 2010 Felipe Perez announced to the press that Comaz was evaluating with their legal counsel the possibility of suing Concacaf in the next couple of days.

== Women's event ==
=== Squads ===
Guatemala (GUA)
- Stephanie Castellón
- Ana Lucía Spross
- Daniela Méndez
- Coralia Monterroso
- Marilyn Rivera
- Andrea Véliz
- Shannon Brooks
- Londy Barrios
- Kimberly de León
- Amarilis Lohaiza
- Cinthya López
- Rocío Sosa
- Gladys Suriano
- Katherine Ramos
- Ana Lucía Martínez
- María Monterroso
- Wendy Pineda
- Sheny Vega

== Results ==
24 July 2010

Puerto Rico	0–2	Haiti
	Report

Mayagüez Athletics Stadium, Mayagüez
24 July 2010

Trinidad and Tobago	4–0	Nicaragua
	Report

Mayagüez Athletics Stadium, Mayagüez
24 July 2010

Venezuela	2–1	Guatemala
	Report

Mayagüez Athletics Stadium, Mayagüez
26 July 2010

Nicaragua	1–1	Haiti
	Report

Mayagüez Athletics Stadium, Mayagüez
26 July 2010

Puerto Rico	1–1	Guatemala
	Report

Mayagüez Athletics Stadium, Mayagüez
26 July 2010

Venezuela	1–0	Trinidad and Tobago
	Report

Mayagüez Athletics Stadium, Mayagüez
28 July 2010

Trinidad and Tobago	3–2	Puerto Rico
	Report

Mayagüez Athletics Stadium, Mayagüez
28 July 2010

Haiti	1–2	Guatemala
	Report

Mayagüez Athletics Stadium, Mayagüez
28 July 2010

Venezuela	1–0	Nicaragua
	Report

Mayagüez Athletics Stadium, Mayagüez
30 July 2010

Trinidad and Tobago	3–2	Guatemala
	Report

Mayagüez Athletics Stadium, Mayagüez
30 July 2010

Puerto Rico	3–1	Nicaragua
	Report

Mayagüez Athletics Stadium, Mayagüez
30 July 2010

Haiti	1–3	Venezuela
	Report

Mayagüez Athletics Stadium, Mayagüez
1 August 2010

Nicaragua	1–4	Guatemala
	Report

Mayagüez Athletics Stadium, Mayagüez
1 August 2010

Haiti	1–0	Trinidad and Tobago
	Report

Mayagüez Athletics Stadium, Mayagüez
1 August 2010

Puerto Rico	1–1	Venezuela
	Report

Mayagüez Athletics Stadium, Puerto Rico

== Table ==
The table is compiled by awarding 3 points for a victory, one point for a draw, and no points for a loss.

Pos	Team	Pld	W	D	L	GF	GA	GD	Pts	Qualification or relegation
1	Venezuela	5	4	1	0	8	3	+5	13	Champions
2	Trinidad and Tobago	5	3	0	2	10	6	+4	9	
3	Guatemala	5	2	1	2	10	8	+2	7	
4	Haiti	5	2	1	2	6	6	0	7	
5	Puerto Rico	5	1	2	2	7	8	−1	5	
6	Nicaragua	5	0	1	4	3	13	−10	1	

== Winners ==
2010 Central American and Caribbean Games – Women's tournament winners

Venezuela
First title
