= Shannon Woeller =

Canadian soccer player (born 1990)

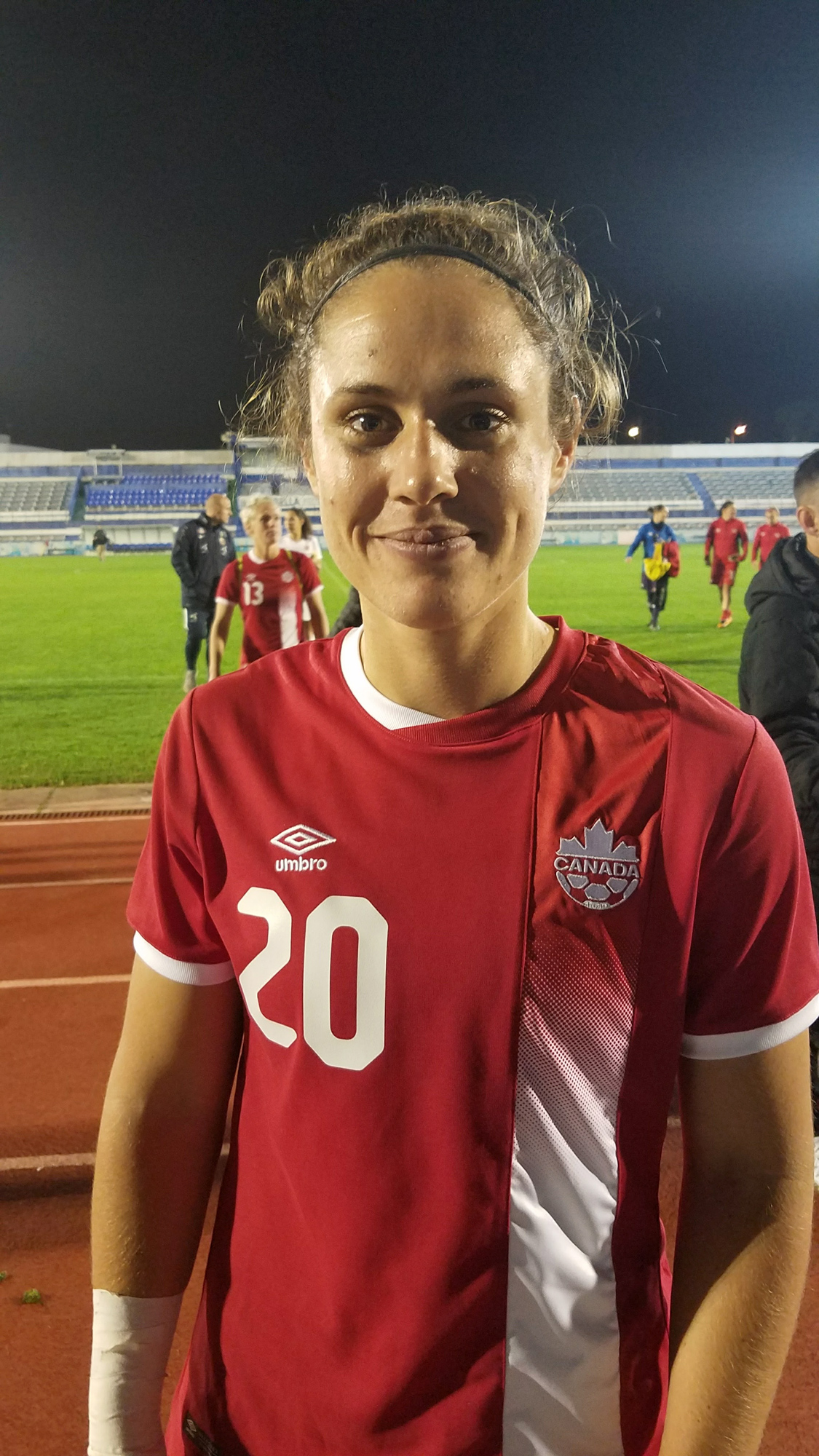
- Woeller after a friendly against Norway in Marbella, Spain in 2017

Personal information
- Full name: Shannon Elizabeth Woeller
- Date of birth: January 31, 1990 (age 36)
- Place of birth: Vancouver, British Columbia, Canada
- Height: 5 ft 8 in (1.73 m)
- Position: Defender

Team information
- Current team: Vancouver Rise
- Number: 2

College career
Years	Team	Apps	(Gls)
2009–2013	Rutgers Scarlet Knights		

Senior career*
Years	Team	Apps	(Gls)
2008–2012	Vancouver Whitecaps FC	47	(4)
2013	Seattle Sounders	8	(1)
2014	IK Grand Bodø	14	(0)
2015	Stjarnan	12	(0)
2017–2018	FF USV Jena	33	(0)
2018–2019	Eskilstuna United DFF	28	(0)
2020	Valencia CF	1	(0)
2021	Växjö DFF	10	(0)
2022	IF Brommapojkarna	23	(0)
2023	IFK Norrköping	26	(3)
2024	Vittsjö GIK	26	(0)
2025–	Vancouver Rise	14	(0)

International career^{‡}
2008–2010	Canada U20	6	(0)
2009–2019	Canada	21	(0)
Medal record
Women's soccer
Representing Canada
Pan American Games
Gold medal – first place	2011 Guadalajara	Team
- * Club domestic league appearances and goals as of 3 August 2025 ‡ National team caps and goals as of April 5, 2019

Shannon Elizabeth Woeller (born January 31, 1990) is a Canadian soccer defender who plays for Vancouver Rise in the Northern Super League.

== College career ==
Woeller played high school soccer for Prince of Wales Secondary School in her native city. She then went to Rutgers University, where she played from 2009 to 2013.

== Club career ==
While still at school and college, Woeller played for Vancouver Whitecaps FC and Seattle Sounders in the W-League In the spring of 2014, she left North America and signed with Norwegian Toppserien club IK Grand Bodø. In 2015, she went to play at Stjarnan, at Iceland top-tier league. On January 26, 2017, Woeller signed up with FF USV Jena, where she replaced countrywoman Rachel Melhado, after more than a year without a club.

After FF USV Jena was relegated from the Frauen-Bundesliga following their last place finish in the 2017–2018 season, Woeller announced she was joining Eskilstuna United DFF in the Damallsvenskan in Sweden.

Woeller was announced as the first signing to Northern Super League's Vancouver Rise for the league's inaugural 2025 season. She started in the league's inaugural match on April 16, 2025, a 1-0 win over Calgary Wild FC. On July 19, 2025, she became the first outfield player to play 1,000 minutes in the NSL for the Rise. She suffered an ACL injury in August 2025, which ruled her out for the remainder of the 2025 season. On April 16, 2026, Woeller was named as team captain, alongside Quinn, for the 2026 season.

== International career ==
Woeller was 15 years old, when she was called for coach Lewis Page to a Canadian U15 camp. In 2008, she was part of the team that won the 2008 CONCACAF Women's U-20 Championship in Mexico. In the same year, Woeller was included in the 21-players squad that represented Canada at the 2008 FIFA U-20 Women's World Cup. On March 7, 2009 she made her debut for Canadian senior team in a match against Netherlands at the 2009 Cyprus Cup. In 2010, Woeller was part of the group that played at 2010 CONCACAF Women's U-20 Championship and finished fourth, failing to qualify for the 2010 FIFA U-20 Women's World Cup in Germany. In 2011, she was included by coach John Herdman in the 18-players squad that represented Canada at the 2011 Pan American Games in Mexico. The team concluded its participation in the competition, winning the gold medal in a match against Brazil. In 2012, Woeller was in the 20-players squad that played at the 2012 CONCACAF Women's Olympic Qualifying Tournament. The tournament was held in her native city and Canada qualified for the women's tournament at the Olympic Games. Although, she was not part of the final 18 players who represented Canada in London.

Following her call-up in March 2012, Woeller would not receive another call-up to the Canadian senior team for almost five years. She was called up for a friendly on April 9, 2017 against the German national team in Erfurt, Germany. She was also named to Canada's squad for the 2018 Algarve Cup.

On May 25, 2019 she was named to the roster for the 2019 FIFA Women's World Cup.

== Personal life ==
Woeller is great granddaughter of the Canadian former ice hockey player Beattie Ramsay and granddaughter of Archdeacon David John Woeller.
