= Alexia Estrada =

Guatemalan footballer (born 2001)

Personal information
- Full name: Alexia Estrada Bigue
- Date of birth: 29 January 2001 (age 25)
- Place of birth: San Francisco, California, U.S.
- Height: 1.73 m (5 ft 8 in)
- Position: Goalkeeper

Team information
- Current team: San Francisco Dons
- Number: 24

Youth career
- South San Francisco Warriors

College career
Years	Team	Apps	(Gls)
2019–2021	City College of San Francisco Rams	44	(0)
2022	Stanislaus State Warriors	17	(0)
2023–	San Francisco Dons	2	(0)

International career^{‡}
2022–	Guatemala	3	(0)
- ‡ National team caps and goals as of 12 April 2022.

Alexia Estrada Bigue (born 29 January 2001) is a footballer who plays as a goalkeeper for collegiate team San Francisco Dons. Born and raised in the United States to a Guatemalan father and a French mother, she caps for the Guatemala women's national team.

== Early life ==
Estrada was born in San Francisco, California, United States and raised in South San Francisco, California. Her father is from San Raymundo, Guatemala and her mother is French. She has attended the South San Francisco High School.

== College career ==
Estrada has attended the City College of San Francisco in the United States.

== International career ==
Estrada made her senior debut for Guatemala on 16 February 2022, starting in a 9–0 home win over the United States Virgin Islands during the 2022 CONCACAF W Championship qualification.

== See also ==
- List of Guatemala women's international footballers
