= Amelia Pietrangelo =

Canadian soccer player (born 1993)

Amy Pietrangelo
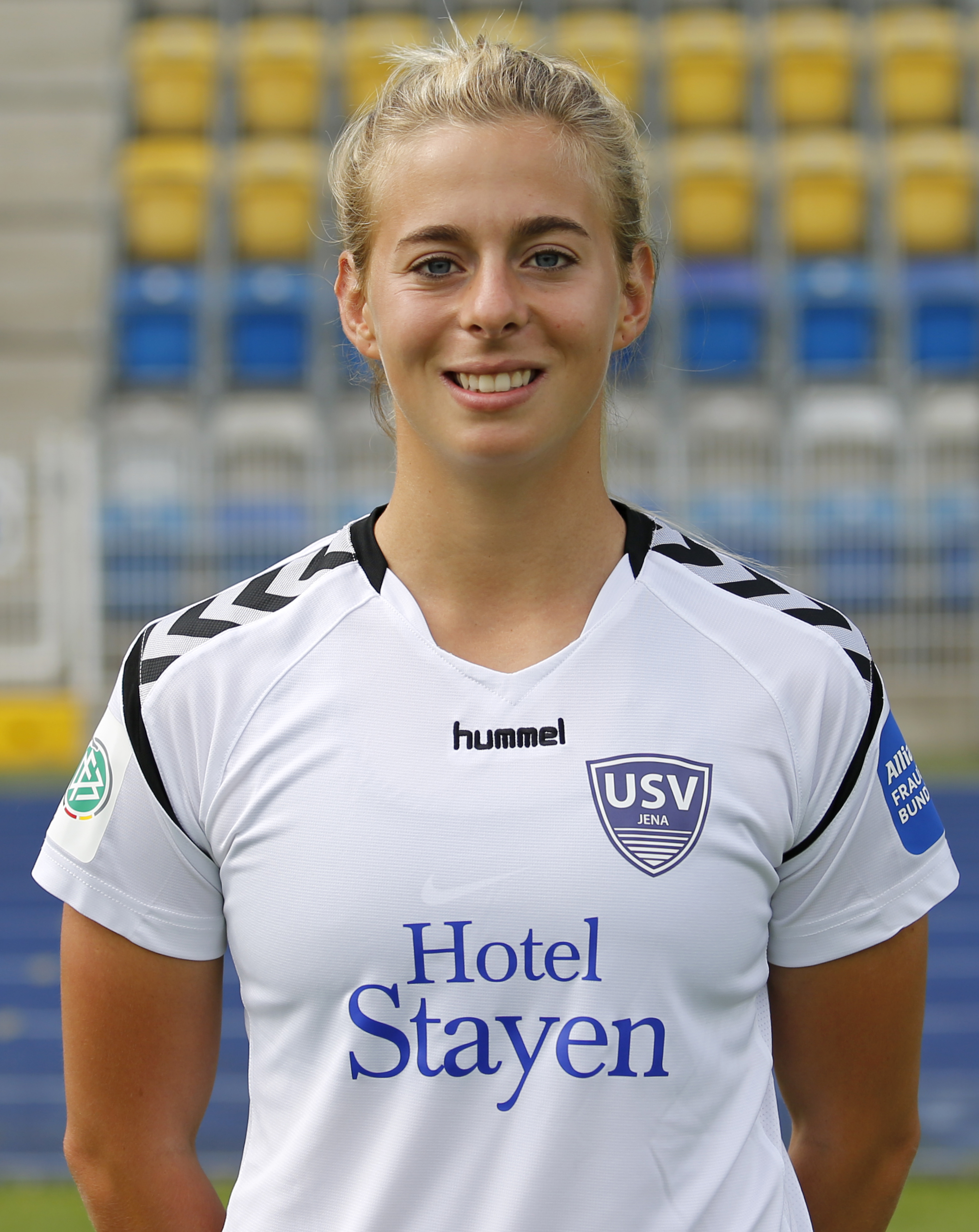
- Pietrangelo with FF USV Jena in 2017.

Personal information
- Full name: Amelia Filomena Pietrangelo
- Date of birth: July 14, 1993 (age 33)
- Place of birth: Laval, Quebec, Canada
- Height: 1.63 m (5 ft 4 in)
- Position: Striker

Team information
- Current team: CS Monteuil

Youth career
- CS Monteuil

College career
Years	Team	Apps	(Gls)
2011–2014	Rutgers Scarlet Knights	70	(7)

Senior career*
Years	Team	Apps	(Gls)
2011	Laval Comets	4	(0)
2013–2015	Laval Comets	24	(7)
2016–2017	FC Neunkirch	10	(1)
2017–2018	USV Jena	20	(4)
2021	CS Monteuil	2	(0)

International career^{‡}
2012	Canada U20	4	(1)
2010–2011	Canada	6	(1)
Medal record
Representing Canada U-20
CONCACAF Women's U-20 Championship
Silver medal – second place	2012 Panama City
Representing Canada
International Women's Football Tournament
Gold medal – first place	2010 São Paulo
Pan American Games
Gold medal – first place	2011 Guadalajara	Team
Representing FC Neunkirch
Gold medal – first place	Nationalliga A	2017
Gold medal – first place	Swiss Women's Cup	2017
- * Club domestic league appearances and goals as of August 15, 2021 ‡ National team caps and goals as of December 20, 2017

Amelia Filomena Pietrangelo (born July 14, 1993) is a Canadian soccer player who plays as a striker.

== Early life ==
Born in Laval, Quebec, Pietrangelo began playing soccer at the age of four for CS Monteuil. She began to play competitively at the age of eight with players a year older than herself. As a child, Pietrangelo also participated in gymnastics and figure skating.

Aged 14, she received her first call-up to Quebec's provincial team to play at the Canadian Championships and was subsequently scouted by the Canadian national team. Pietrangelo won gold at the Under-16 Canadian Championship and was named Juvenile Player of the Year by the Quebec Soccer Federation.

== College career ==
Pietrangelo attended Rutgers University to study Exercise Science on a full scholarship and played for the Scarlet Knights from 2011 to 2014.

She scored once in 18 games in her freshman year, and made a further 13 appearances the following year while contributing two goals. Pietrangelo made 19 appearances in her junior year, and scored four goals while starting all 20 matches as a midfielder in her senior year.

== Club career ==
=== Laval Comets ===
During her time at Rutgers University, she also competed with W-League side Laval Comets. After four appearances in 2011, Pietrangelo returned to the club in 2013 and scored seven goals in 24 appearances.

=== Indoor soccer ===
In 2015, Pietrangelo competed in the Quebec Soccer League - an indoor league based in Montreal. She scored three goals in four games for Fly Emirates and 18 goals in nine games for Tough Mothers.

=== FC Neunkirch ===
On January 6, 2016, she completed a move to Swiss club FC Neunkirch to link up with fellow Canadian international Alyssa Lagonia. During her time with the club, Pietrangelo won the Nationalliga A and the Swiss Women's Cup.

=== FF USV Jena ===
On June 26, 2017, Pietrangelo joined Frauen-Bundesliga club FF USV Jena on a one-year contract. In doing so, she became the third Canadian to represent the club alongside Tiffany Cameron and Shannon Woeller. In the second last game of the season, she suffered a serious knee injury.

=== CS Monteuil ===
In 2021, she played with CS Monteuil of the Première Ligue de soccer du Québec, helping the team to a second place finish.

== International career ==
In 2010, Pietrangelo first featured in the Canadian youth program as a 16-year-old under Bryan Rosenfold. Later that year she made her international debut in a 5–0 victory against the Netherlands on December 9.

On October 18, 2011, she scored her first international goal in a 3–1 win over Costa Rica. She won gold at the 2011 Pan American Games in Guadalajara, Mexico, but was unable to appear in the championship match due to school commitments. At the end of the year, Pietrangelo was named Canadian Under-20 Player of the Year.

In 2012, she won silver at the CONCACAF Women's Under-20 Championship in Panama.

In November 2017, she received a call-up to the national team after a five-year absence.
