= Relin Sosa Athletic Track =

Athletic track in Cabo Rojo, Puerto Rico

Coordinates: 18.079°N 67.148°W

- Interactive map of Relin Sosa Athletic Track
- Location: Cabo Rojo, Puerto Rico
- Capacity: 3,000

Relin Sosa Athletic Track is an athletic track in Cabo Rojo, Puerto Rico. It hosted some of the football events for the 2010 Central American and Caribbean Games.
