= Andrea Véliz =

Guatemalan footballer

Personal information
- Full name: Marlen Andrea Véliz Florián
- Date of birth: 11 February 1993 (age 33)
- Position: Defender

Senior career*
Years	Team	Apps	(Gls)
2010–2014	Unifut		

International career^{‡}
2011–2012	Guatemala U20	2	(0)
2010	Guatemala	1	(0)
- * Club domestic league appearances and goals ‡ National team caps and goals as of 6 March 2012

Marlen Andrea Véliz Florián (born 11 February 1993), known as Andrea Véliz, is a Guatemalan retired footballer who played as a defender. She has been a member of the Guatemala women's national team.

== International career ==
Véliz capped for Guatemala at senior level during the 2010 Central American and Caribbean Games.
