= Shannon Brooks =

American-born Guatemalan footballer

Personal information
- Full name: Shannon Kim Brooks Santos
- Birth name: Shannon Kim Brooks
- Date of birth: 24 June 1991 (age 35)
- Place of birth: Monrovia, California, United States
- Height: 1.68 m (5 ft 6 in)
- Position: Defender

Youth career
- Monrovia High School

College career
Years	Team	Apps	(Gls)
2009–2012	North Dakota State Bison	48	(3)

International career^{‡}
2010–2012	Guatemala	5	(0)
- ‡ National team caps and goals as of 24 January 2012

Shannon Kim Brooks Santos (born 24 June 1991) is an American-born Guatemalan former footballer who has played as a defender. She has been a member of the Guatemala women's national team.

== Early life ==
Brooks was born and raised in Monrovia, California with a Guatemalan mother. When she was young, she and her mother sometimes had to sleep in their car. She attended Monrovia High School, where she played football and softball for the school. She earned All-Area honours for playing in both sports. Her skills led to her signing a National Letter of Intent to play football at North Dakota State University. She chose to play for North Dakota State Bisons over options from other universities such as the United States Air Force Academy and the California State University, Northridge.

== International career ==
Brooks successfully passed a trial of 100 players to earn one of ten places playing for the Guatemala women's national under-20 football team. She was a part of their 2010 CONCACAF Women's U-20 Championship team, where she scored one goal in a campaign that also featured Guatemala's first win at a major women's tournament. She was capped for the Guatemala women's national football team during the 2010 CONCACAF Women's World Cup Qualifying qualification, the 2010 Central American and Caribbean Games and the 2012 CONCACAF Women's Olympic Qualifying Tournament.

== Career after football ==
After university, Brooks worked in a non-playing role as an events manager for Chivas USA. She then went on to attend the University of Southern California to obtain a master's degree in communication management.

== See also ==
- List of Guatemala women's international footballers
