= Francisca Mardones (footballer) =

Chilean footballer (born 1989)

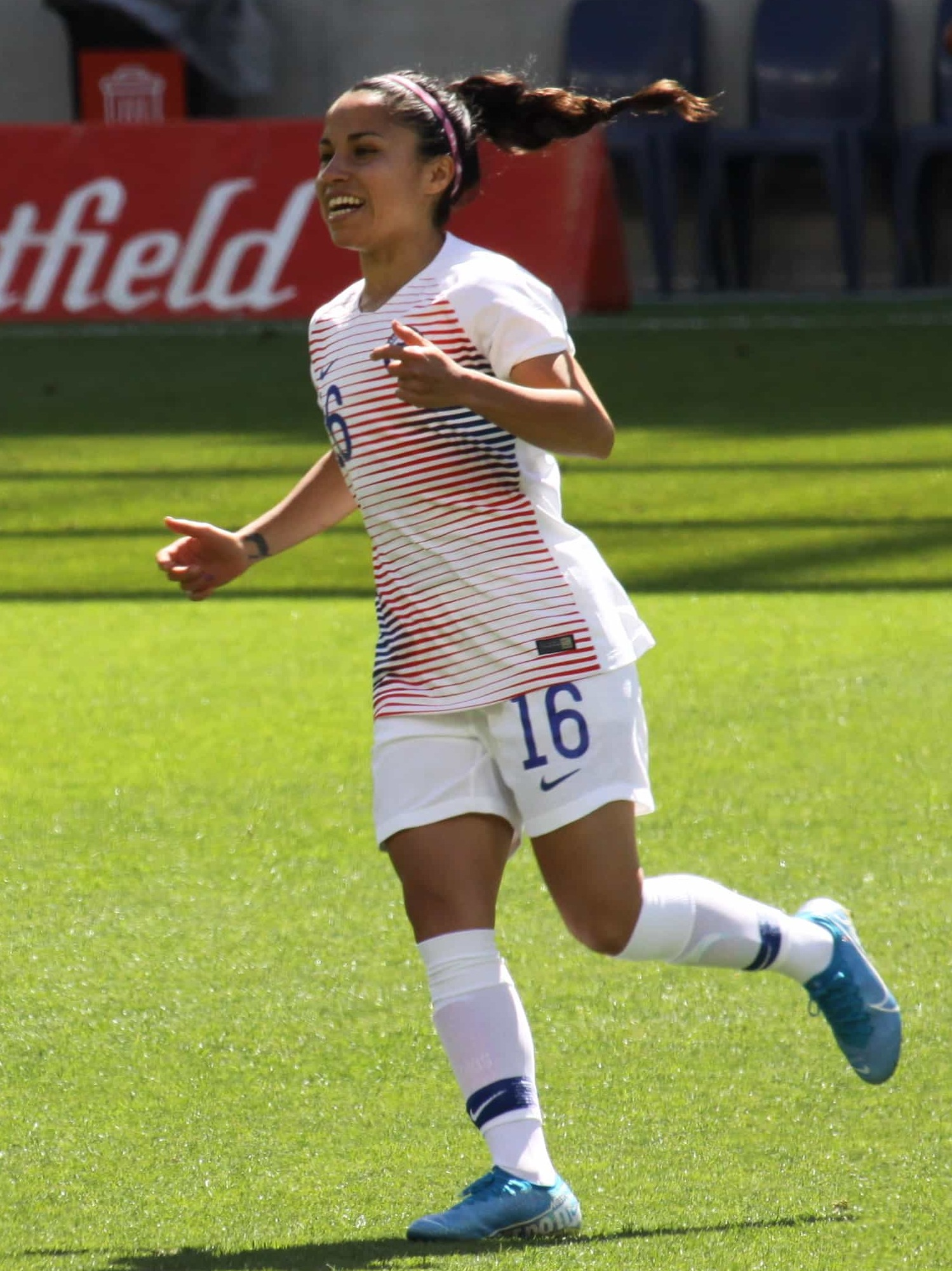
- Mardones with Chile in 2019

Personal information
- Full name: María Francisca Mardones Sáez
- Date of birth: 24 March 1989 (age 37)
- Place of birth: Santiago, Chile
- Position: Midfielder

Team information
- Current team: Colo-Colo
- Number: 29

Youth career
- Universidad de Chile

College career
Years	Team	Apps	(Gls)
2012	LCCC Golden Eagles	14	(0)

Senior career*
Years	Team	Apps	(Gls)
2008	Ferroviarios		
2008–2009	Unión La Calera		
2010–2012	Colo-Colo		
2016–2021	Santiago Morning		
2022–	Colo-Colo		

International career^{‡}
2008	Chile U20	3	(1)
2010–	Chile	3	(1)
2017	Chile (futsal)		
- * Club domestic league appearances and goals ‡ National team caps and goals as of 01:25, 17 June 2019 (UTC)

María Francisca Mardones Sáez (born 24 March 1989), known as Francisca Mardones, is a Chilean footballer who plays as a midfielder for Santiago Morning and the Chile women's national team.

== Club career ==
Mardones began to play football in her neighbourhood before joining Universidad de Chile, aged 13.

She has played for Ferroviarios and Unión La Calera.

In 2022, Mardones joined Colo-Colo from Santiago Morning. She had previously played for them from 2010 to 2012.

== International career ==
Mardones represented Chile at the 2008 FIFA U-20 Women's World Cup. She made her senior debut during the 2011 Pan American Games.

As a futsal player, she represented the Chile national team in the 2017 Copa América.

=== International goals ===
Scores and results list Chile's goal tally first

No.	Date	Venue	Opponent	Score	Result	Competition
1	22 October 2011	Estadio Omnilife, Zapopan, Mexico	Trinidad and Tobago	2–0	3–0	2011 Pan American Games

== Personal life ==
She attended the Professional Institute and Technical Training Center in Santiago of the Santo Tomás University as a student of fitness coaching.
