= 2012 CONCACAF Women's U-20 Championship =

Campeonato Sub-20 Femenino de la CONCACAF 2012 (in Spanish)

Tournament details
- Host country: Panama
- City: Panama City
- Dates: March 1–11
- Teams: 8 (from 1 confederation)
- Venue: 1 (in 1 host city)

Final positions
- Champions: United States (3rd title)
- Runners-up: Canada
- Third place: Mexico
- Fourth place: Panama

Tournament statistics
- Matches played: 16
- Goals scored: 72 (4.5 per match)
- Attendance: 10,382 (649 per match)
- Top scorer: (Mexico) Natalia Gómez-Junco (6 goals)

The 2012 CONCACAF Women's U-20 Championship was the sixth edition of the CONCACAF Women's U-20 Championship. The final tournament was hosted by Panama from 1 to 11 March 2012. All matches were played at the Estadio Rommel Fernández. The top three teams of the 2012 tournament earned qualification to the 2012 FIFA U-20 Women's World Cup. The tournament was won by the United States, who defeated Canada in the final, 2–1. Mexico secured the final qualification position by defeating Panama in the third place match, 5–0.

== Qualification ==
Team	Qualification	Appearances	Previous best performances
North American zone
Canada	Automatic	6th	Champion (**2004**, 2008)
Mexico	Automatic	6th	Runner-up (2010)
United States (TH)	Automatic	6th	Champion (2006, 2010)
Central American zone qualified through the Central America qualifying
Guatemala	Group 1 Winner	2nd	First round (**2010**)
Panama	Group 2 Winner	4th	First round (2002, 2004, 2006)
Caribbean zone qualified through the Caribbean qualifying
Haiti	Group E Winner	2nd	First round (2002)
Cuba	Group F Winner	3rd	First round (2008, 2010)
Jamaica	Best Group Runner-up	6th	Fourth place (2006)

Bold indicates that the corresponding team was hosting the event.
Note: Panama qualified to the tournament, only later was announced as host.

== Venue ==
2012 CONCACAF Women's U-20 Championship is located in Panama	Panama City
2012 CONCACAF Women's U-20 Championship is located in Panama	Estadio Rommel Fernández
2012 CONCACAF Women's U-20 Championship is located in Panama	Capacity: **32,000**

== Match officials ==
The match officials were announced the 14 February 2012.

Country	Referee
Mexico	Quetzalli Alvarado
Mexico	Alondra Arellano
Guyana	Dianne Ferreira-James
Costa Rica	Maria Flores Castillo
Saint Lucia	Sabina Charles-Kirton
Barbados	Gillian Martindale
Cuba	Annia Navarrete
Jamaica	Cardella Samuels
Guatemala	Alicia Villatoro
Suriname	Deborah Zebeda

Country	Assistant Referee
El Salvador	Elizabeth Aguilar
Cuba	Elizabeth Cuff
Mexico	Lixy Enríquez
Guyana	Nikasie Liverpool
El Salvador	Patricia Pacheco
Honduras	Shirley Perello
United States	Verónica Pérez
Honduras	Mady Santos Turcios
Guatemala	Lesvia Tzul
Jamaica	Antonette Williams

== Group stage ==
The draw for the tournament took place on the 15 January 2012 in the CONCACAF offices in Miami Beach, Florida. The schedule was announced on the 25 January 2012.
All matches up to 9 March 2012 (group stage and semi-finals) are EST (UTC−05:00). The last two matches (third place match and final) are EDT (UTC−04:00).

Key to colors in group tables
Advanced to Semi-finals

=== Group A ===
Team	Pld	W	D	L	GF	GA	GD	Pts
Canada	3	3	0	0	8	0	+8	**9**
Mexico	3	2	0	1	13	2	+11	**6**
Jamaica	3	0	1	2	1	5	−4	**1**
Haiti	3	0	1	2	0	15	−15	**1**

March 1, 2012
17:00

Canada	5–0	Haiti
Ezurike 47', 53'; Charron-Delage 51', 62'; Richardson 59'	Report

Estadio Rommel Fernández, Panama City
Attendance: 150
Referee: Dianne Ferreira-James (Guyana)
March 1, 2012
19:30

Mexico	3–1	Jamaica
Samarzich 6'; Gómez Junco 39'; C. Martinez 44'	Report	Spence 15'

Estadio Rommel Fernández, Panama City
Attendance: 250
Referee: Alicia Villatoro (Guatemala)

March 3, 2012
17:00

Mexico	10–0	Haiti
Samarzich 19'; A. Martínez 29', 48'; Jiménez 32'; Gómez Junco 59', 60', 77'; Franco 64'; Solís 76', 77'	Report

Estadio Rommel Fernández, Panama City
Attendance: 101
Referee: Sabina Charles-Kirton (Saint Lucia)
March 3, 2012
19:30

Jamaica	0–2	Canada
	Report	Richardson 75'; Charron-Delage 82'

Estadio Rommel Fernández, Panama City
Attendance: 101
Referee: Annia Navarrete (Cuba)

March 5, 2012
17:00

Haiti	0–0	Jamaica
	Report

Estadio Rommel Fernández, Panama City
Attendance: 100
Referee: Deborah Zebeda (Suriname)
March 5, 2012
19:30

Canada	1–0	Mexico
Legault-Cordisco 25'	Report

Estadio Rommel Fernández, Panama City
Attendance: 153
Referee: Dianne Ferreira-James (Guyana)

=== Group B ===
Team	Pld	W	D	L	GF	GA	GD	Pts
United States	3	3	0	0	18	0	+18	**9**
Panama	3	2	0	1	5	8	−3	**6**
Guatemala	3	1	0	2	6	11	−5	**3**
Cuba	3	0	0	3	3	13	−10	**0**

March 2, 2012
17:00

United States	6–0	Guatemala
Horan 12', 47', 74'; Johnston 29'; Stengel 54'; Roccaro 60'	Report

Estadio Rommel Fernández, Panama City
Attendance: 250
Referee: Gillian Martindale (Barbados)
March 2, 2012
19:30

Panama	2–1	Cuba
Evans 16'; Cox 54'	Report	Pelaez 27'

Estadio Rommel Fernández, Panama City
Attendance: 935
Referee: Quetzalli Alvarado (Mexico)

March 4, 2012
17:00

Cuba	0–6	United States
	Report	Stengel 4', 37'; Hayes 25', 29'; DiBernardo 53'; Ubogagu 84'

Estadio Rommel Fernández, Panama City
Attendance: 1,170
Referee: Alondra Arellano (Mexico)
March 4, 2012
19:30

Panama	3–1	Guatemala
Mills 39'; Zorrilla 48'; Jordan 82'	Report	Monterroso 40'

Estadio Rommel Fernández, Panama City
Attendance: 1,170
Referee: Cardella Samuels (Jamaica)

March 6, 2012
17:00

Guatemala	5–2	Cuba
Monterroso 27'; Argueta 31'; Pérez 32'; López 67' (pen.); Bayeux 68' (o.g.)	Report	Pérez 53'; Peláez 80'

Estadio Rommel Fernández, Panama City
Attendance: 80
Referee: Maria Flores Castillo (Costa Rica)
March 6, 2012
19:30

Panama	0–6	United States
	Report	Capelle 29'; DiBernardo 44'; Johnston 53'; Hayes 59', 78'; Mewis 69'

Estadio Rommel Fernández, Panama City
Attendance: 1,380
Referee: Alondra Arellano (Mexico)

== Knockout rounds ==
The winners of the two semifinals and the third place match qualify for the 2012 FIFA U-20 Women's World Cup in Japan.

Semi-finals
March 9 – Panama City
**United States**	**4**
Mexico	0
March 9 – Panama City
**Canada**	**6**
Panama	0

Final
March 11 – Panama City
**United States**	**2**
Canada	1
Third place
March 11 – Panama City
**Mexico**	**5**
Panama	0

=== Semi-finals ===
March 9, 2012
17:00

United States	4–0	Mexico
Johnston 11'; Brian 37'; Horan 38'; Ohai 81'	Report

Estadio Rommel Fernández, Panama City
Attendance: 2,071
Referee: Gillian Martindale (Barbados)
March 9, 2012
20:00

Canada	6–0	Panama
Ezurike 25'; Richardson 47'; Oduro 49', 84'; Pietrangelo 69'; Sawicki 88'	Report

Estadio Rommel Fernández, Panama City
Attendance: 2,071
Referee: Annia Navarrete (Cuba)

=== Third place match ===
March 11, 2012
18:00

Mexico	5–0	Panama
Franco 18', 47'; Gómez-Junco 25', 90+1' (pen.); Samarzich 44'	Report

Estadio Rommel Fernández, Panama City
Attendance: 200
Referee: Dianne Ferreira-James (Guyana)

=== Final ===
March 11, 2012
21:00

United States	2–1	Canada
Hayes 79'; Ubogagu 88'	Report	Richardson 5'

Estadio Rommel Fernández, Panama City
Attendance: 200
Referee: Quetzalli Alvarado (Mexico)

== Awards ==
2012 CONCACAF Women's Under-20 Championship winners

**United States**
**Third title**

== Goalscorers ==
6 goals

- (Mexico) Natalia Gómez Junco

5 goals

- (United States) Maya Hayes

4 goals

- (Canada) Jenna Richardson
- (United States) Lindsey Horan

3 goals

- (Canada) Catherine Charron-Delage
- (Canada) Nkemjika Ezurike
- (Mexico) Yamile Franco
- (Mexico) Tanya Samarzich
- (United States) Julie Johnston
- (United States) Katie Stengel

2 goals

- (Canada) Christabel Oduro
- (Cuba) Rachel Peláez
- (Guatemala) Maria Monterroso
- (Mexico) Ariana Martínez
- (Mexico) Daniela Solís
- (United States) Vanessa DiBernardo
- (United States) Chioma Ubogagu

1 goal

- (Canada) Vanessa Legault-Cordisco
- (Canada) Amélia Pietrangelo
- (Canada) Jaclyn Sawicki
- (Cuba) María Pérez
- (Guatemala) Maria Argueta
- (Guatemala) Cinthya López
- (Guatemala) Idania Pérez
- (Jamaica) Kimberly Spence
- (Mexico) Olivia Jiménez
- (Mexico) Chrystal Martínez
- (Panama) Marta Cox
- (Panama) Ángela Evans
- (Panama) Maira Jordan
- (Panama) Natalia Mills
- (Panama) Yessenia Zorrilla
- (United States) Morgan Brian
- (United States) Micaela Capelle
- (United States) Samantha Mewis
- (United States) Kealia Ohai
- (United States) Cari Roccaro

1 own goal

- (Cuba) Odette Bayeux (playing against Guatemala)

== See also ==
- 2012 FIFA U-20 Women's World Cup
