= 2nd century in Roman Britain =

Events from the 2nd century in Roman Britain.

== Events ==
- 108
  - Legio IX Hispana last definitely known to be in Britain (at Eboracum (York) in what would eventually be northern England).
- 118
  - Governor Quintus Pompeius Falco suppresses a revolt by the Brigantes.
- c. 120
  - Car Dyke constructed over newly drained East Anglian Fens.
- 122
  - Summer – Emperor Hadrian visits Britain, appoints Aulus Platorius Nepos as governor and orders construction of Hadrian's Wall to begin.
  - Construction of forum in Londinium (London) is completed.
- 130
  - Town centre of Wroxeter redeveloped.
- 139
  - Newly appointed Governor Quintus Lollius Urbicus advances to the Clyde-Forth line, reconstructing Corstopitum as a base.
- 142
  - Emperor Antoninus Pius orders the construction of the Antonine Wall across the Central Belt of Scotland.
- 154
  - Governor Gnaeus Julius Verus suppresses a revolt by the Brigantes.
  - Antonine Wall overrun.
- 155
  - Fire destroys much of central Verulamium (St Albans).
- 158
  - Refortification of Hadrian's Wall begins.
- 160
  - Antonine Wall reoccupied.
- 163
  - Antonine Wall abandoned. Governor Sextus Calpurnius Agricola rebuilds forts along Hadrian's Wall.
- 175
  - 5,500 conscripted Sarmatian cavalry stationed in northern Britain.
- 180
  - Northern tribes breach Hadrian's Wall and ravage the countryside.
  - Governor Ulpius Marcellus launches punitive campaigns to the north.
- 185
  - Marcellus forced to retreat to Hadrian's Wall.
  - Roman army in Britain mutinies. Pertinax appointed as governor and suppresses mutiny.
- 187
  - Pertinax resigns, after becoming unpopular with the army.
- 192
  - Clodius Albinus, Governor of Britain, briefly proclaimed Emperor, but instead acquiesces to the rival claim of Septimius Severus.
- 196
  - Albinus proclaims himself "Augustus" and invades Gaul, seeking to overthrow Severus.
- 197
  - 19 February – Albinus defeated at the Battle of Lugdunum in Gaul; Severus appoints Virius Lupus as governor.
  - Maeatae launch raids against Hadrian's Wall.
