= Beberlin Clara =

Guatemalan footballer and futsal player

Personal information
- Full name: Beberlin Eunice Clara Hernández
- Date of birth: 9 May 1989 (age 37)
- Position: Midfielder

Team information
- Current team: Unifut Rosal

Senior career*
Years	Team	Apps	(Gls)
- FC Fusión (futsal)
- Unifut Rosal

International career^{‡}
- Guatemala (futsal)
2019–	Guatemala	2	(0)
- * Club domestic league appearances and goals ‡ National team caps and goals as of 8 October 2019

Beberlin Eunice Clara Hernández (born 9 May 1989) is a Guatemalan futsal player and a footballer who plays as a midfielder for Unifut Rosal and the Guatemala women's national team.
