= Sabrina Botrán =

Guatemalan footballer

Personal information
- Full name: Sabrina Botrán Cordón
- Date of birth: 18 April 2001 (age 25)
- Place of birth: Guatemala
- Position: Goalkeeper

Team information
- Current team: Comunicaciones

Youth career
- 2015–2018: Montverde Academy

Senior career*
Years	Team	Apps	(Gls)
2019–	Comunicaciones		

International career^{‡}
2019–	Guatemala	2	(0)
- * Club domestic league appearances and goals ‡ National team caps and goals as of 8 October 2019

Sabrina Botrán Cordón (born 18 April 2001) is a Guatemalan footballer who plays as a goalkeeper for Comunicaciones FC and the Guatemala women's national team.

== See also ==
- List of Guatemala women's international footballers
