= Ana Lucía Spross =

Guatemalan footballer

Personal information
- Full name: Ana Lucía Spross Urrutia
- Date of birth: 15 May 1982 (age 44)
- Height: 1.68 m (5 ft 6 in)
- Position: Goalkeeper

College career
Years	Team	Apps	(Gls)
2018	College of the Canyons Cougars	18	(0)

Senior career*
Years	Team	Apps	(Gls)
2010	Comunicaciones		

International career^{‡}
2010	Guatemala	4	(0)

Managerial career
- 2019: College of the Canyons (women, assistant coach)
- * Club domestic league appearances and goals as of 17 November 2018 ‡ National team caps and goals as of 30 October 2010

Ana Lucía Spross Urrutia (born 15 May 1982) is a Guatemalan football manager and a former footballer who played as a goalkeeper. She has been a member of the Guatemala women's national team.

== Early life ==
Spross hails from Guatemala City.

== College career ==
In 2018, 36-years-old Spross joined the College of the Canyons in Santa Clarita, California, United States and played for its women's soccer team, known as the Cougars. Next year, she became the assistant coach of the side.

== International career ==
Spross capped for Guatemala at senior level during the 2010 Central American and Caribbean Games and the 2010 CONCACAF Women's World Cup Qualifying.
