= Jaqueline Jolón =

Guatemalan footballer

Personal information
- Full name: Jaqueline Marisol Jolón González
- Date of birth: 24 May 1999 (age 27)
- Position: Goalkeeper

Team information
- Current team: Municipal

Senior career*
Years	Team	Apps	(Gls)
- Municipal

International career^{‡}
2021–	Guatemala	1	(0)
- * Club domestic league appearances and goals ‡ National team caps and goals as of 16 February 2021.

Jaqueline Marisol Jolón González (born 24 May 1999) is a Guatemalan footballer who plays as a goalkeeper for CSD Municipal and the Guatemala women's national team.

== Club career ==
Jolón has played for CSD Municipal in Guatemala.

== International career ==
Jolón made her senior debut for Guatemala on 16 February 2021 in a 3–1 friendly home win over Panama.
