= Daniela Andrade (footballer) =

Guatemalan footballer

Personal information
- Full name: Daniela Andrade Dougherty
- Date of birth: 4 April 1992 (age 34)
- Height: 1.65 m (5 ft 5 in)
- Position: Midfielder

Youth career
- The Pendleton School

College career
Years	Team	Apps	(Gls)
2011–2014	South Florida Bulls	53	(1)

International career^{‡}
2010–2012	Guatemala U20	6	(0)
2010–2014	Guatemala	7	(0)
- ‡ National team caps and goals as of 20 October 2014

Daniela Andrade Dougherty (born 4 April 1992) is a Guatemalan footballer who plays as a midfielder. She has been a member of the Guatemala women's national team.

== See also ==
- List of Guatemala women's international footballers
