= Noemy Franco =

Guatemalan footballer (born 1994)

Personal information
- Full name: Yoselin Noemy Franco Marroquín
- Date of birth: 26 November 1994 (age 31)
- Place of birth: Guatemala
- Height: 1.57 m (5 ft 2 in)
- Position: Goalkeeper

Team information
- Current team: JWU Wildcats
- Number: 1

College career
Years	Team	Apps	(Gls)
2017–2018	ASA Miami Silverstorm	20	(0)
2019–	JWU Wildcats		

Senior career*
Years	Team	Apps	(Gls)
2017	Alianza Petrolera	1+	(0+)

International career^{‡}
2010–2012	Guatemala U20	4	(0)
2014–	Guatemala	1	(0)
- * Club domestic league appearances and goals ‡ National team caps and goals as of 15 October 2014

Yoselin Noemy Franco Marroquín (born 1994), known as Noemy Franco, is a Guatemalan footballer who plays as a goalkeeper for American college Johnson & Wales University–North Miami Wildcats and the Guatemala women's national team.
