= Mía Espino =

American-raised Guatemalan footballer

Personal information
- Full name: Mía Monique Espino Meléndez
- Date of birth: 6 September 1994 (age 32)
- Height: 1.55 m (5 ft 1 in)
- Positions: Midfielder; forward

Youth career
- Whitney M. Young Magnet High School

College career
Years	Team	Apps	(Gls)
2014	Wisconsin–Parkside Rangers	0	(0)
2015–2018	Robert Morris Eagles	13+	(4+)

Senior career*
Years	Team	Apps	(Gls)
- Eclipse Select Soccer Club

International career^{‡}
2012	Guatemala U20	3	(0)
2014	Guatemala	3	(0)
- * Club domestic league appearances and goals ‡ National team caps and goals as of 20 October 2014

Mía Monique Espino Meléndez (born 6 September 1994) is an American-raised Guatemalan footballer who plays as a midfielder. She has been a member of the Guatemala women's national team.
