= Sabrina Ebbersmeyer =

German philosopher

Sabrina Ebbersmeyer is a German philosopher and Associate Professor of Philosophy at the University of Copenhagen. She is known for her work on the philosophy of the Renaissance and early modern period.

== Education and career ==
Ebbersmeyer has studied at the University of Hildesheim, LMU Munich, and Technische Universität Berlin, receiving with her Ph.D. in philosophy from Hildesheim University in 1999. As of 2014 she is an associate professor at the University of Copenhagen. From 2019 until 2022 Ebbersmeyer was the president of the European Society for Early Modern Philosophy.

== Work ==
Ebbersmeyer is a known for her work in scholar in Renaissance and Early Modern philosophy, and women in the history of philosophy.

== Selected publications ==
- Ebbersmeyer, Sabrina; Hutton, Sarah, eds. (2021-10-07). Elisabeth of Bohemia. Cham: Springer. ISBN 978-3-030-71526-7.
- Lines, David A.; Ebbersmeyer, Sabrina, eds. (2013-03-31). Rethinking Virtue, Reforming Society: New Directions in Renaissance Ethics, c.1350 - c.1650. Turnhout: Brepols Publishers. ISBN 978-2-503-52524-2.
- Ebbersmeyer, Sabrina (2010-05-19). Homo agens: Studien zur Genese und Struktur frühhumanistischer Moralphilosophie (in German) (1st ed.). Berlin: De Gruyter. ISBN 978-3-11-022576-1.
- Ebbersmeyer, Sabrina; Kessler, Eckhard; Schmeisser, Martin (2007). Ethik des Nützlichen: Texte zur Moralphilosophie im italienischen Humanismus (in German). Wilhelm Fink. ISBN 978-3-7705-4382-3.
