= Rachel Melhado =

Canadian association football player

Rachelle Melhado
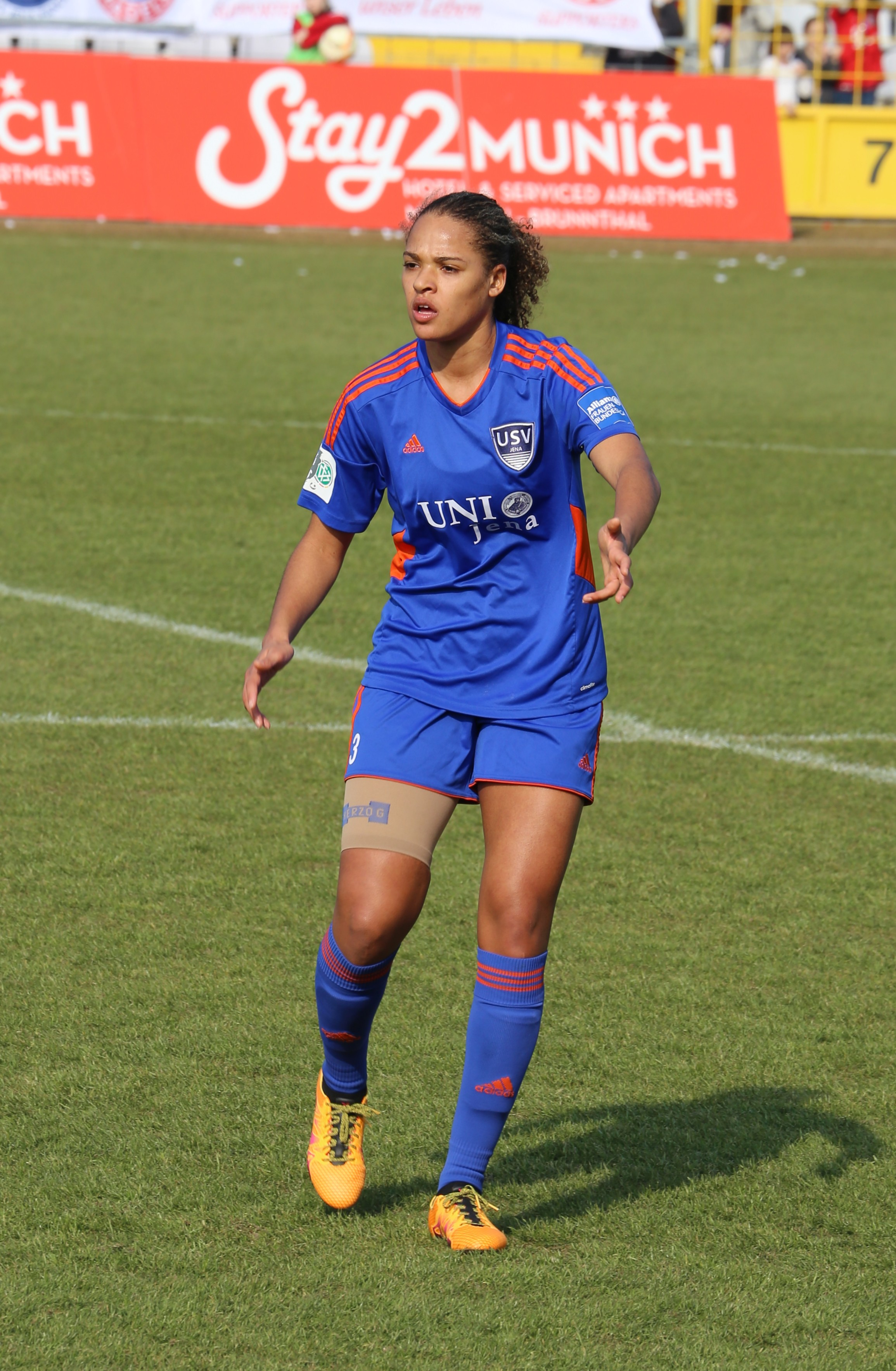

Personal information
- Full name: Rachel Yvonne Melhado
- Date of birth: 24 September 1992 (age 34)
- Place of birth: Mississauga, Ontario, Canada
- Height: 1.75 m (5 ft 9 in)
- Position: Defender

College career
Years	Team	Apps	(Gls)
2010–2013	Louisville Cardinals	75	(0)

Senior career*
Years	Team	Apps	(Gls)
2014–2015	Herforder SV	5	(0)
2015–2017	FF USV Jena	28	(1)

International career
2012	Canada U20	7	(0)
2013	Canada	1	(0)
- * Club domestic league appearances and goals

Rachel Yvonne Melhado (born September 24, 1992) is a Canadian former professional soccer player.
