= Vanessa Legault-Cordisco =

Canadian soccer player

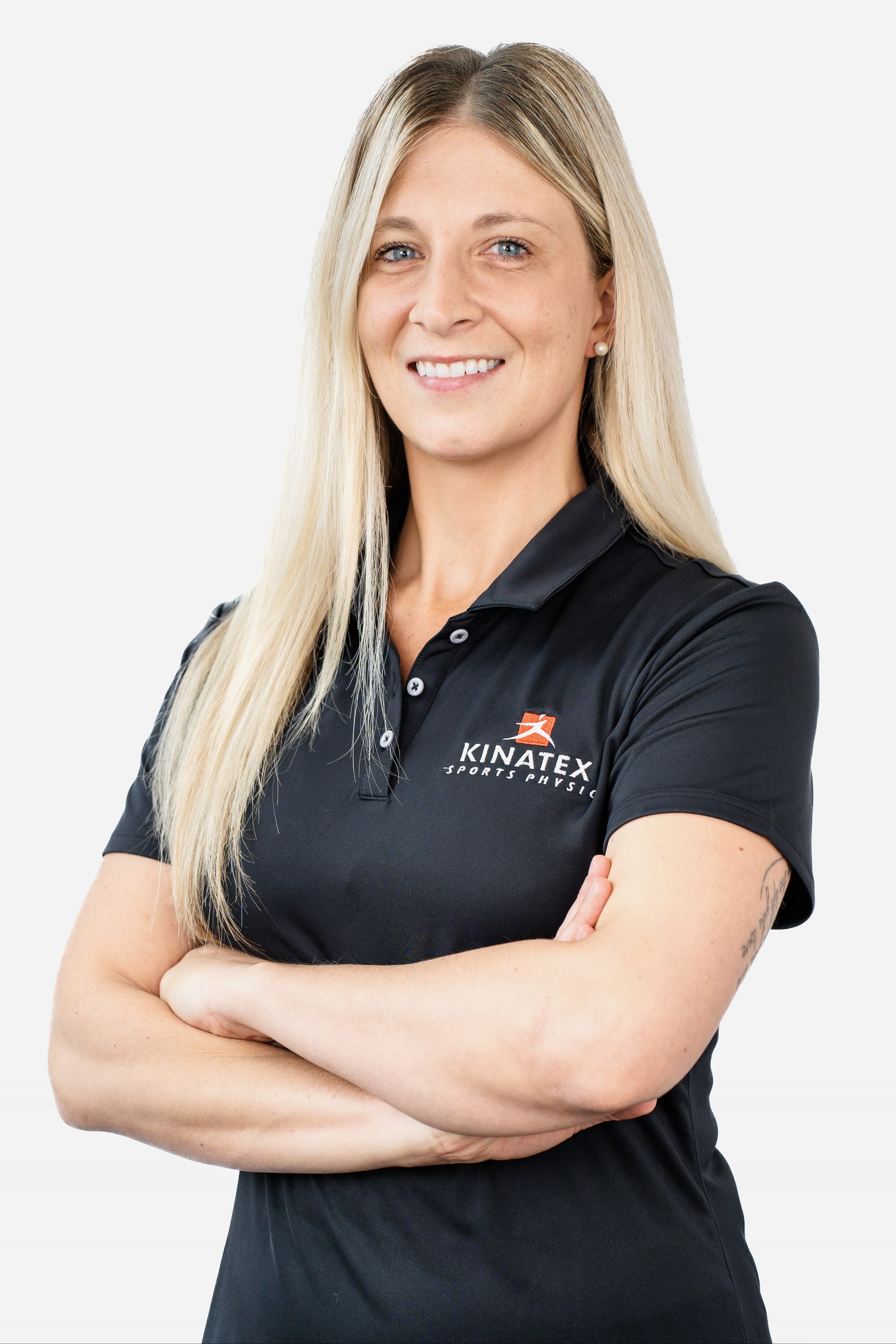

Personal information
- Date of birth: May 11, 1992 (age 34)
- Place of birth: Laval, Quebec, Canada
- Height: 1.70 m (5 ft 7 in)
- Position: Midfielder

Youth career
- Shattuck-Saint Mary's

College career
Years	Team	Apps	(Gls)
2010	University of Evansville		
2011–2013	Marquette University	55	(4)

Senior career*
Years	Team	Apps	(Gls)
2011–2013	Laval Comets		

International career
2010–2012	Canada U20	11	(2)
2010–2011	Canada	2	(0)
Medal record
Women's soccer
Representing Canada
Pan American Games
Gold medal – first place	2011 Guadalajara	Team
- * Club domestic league appearances and goals

Vanessa Legault-Cordisco (born May 11, 1992) is a former Canadian professional soccer player.

She’s now married to Denis Levesque and a mother of two beautiful children (Theodore and Ophelia).

Vanessa Legault-Cordisco is a Physiotherapist at Kinatex Sport Physio at St-Jean-sur-Richelieu, Québec, Canada. She helps people affected by injury, illness or disability through movement and exercise, manual therapy, education and advice. She help maintain health for people of all ages, helping patients to manage pain and prevent disease.

She specializes in Perineal and Pelvic Rehabilitation for woman before, during and after pregnancy.

Vanessa Legault-Cordisco began her college career at the University of Evansville, before transferring to Marquette University. She was named to the 2012-13 BIG EAST All-Academic Team.

After appearances for the Canada U20 team, Legault-Cordisco received her first call-up to the senior Canadian National Team in 2010 at the age of 18. She was named to the Canadian Team for the 2011 Pan American Games where they won the gold medal.
