= Stephanie Castellón =

Guatemalan retired footballer

Personal information
- Full name: Stephanie Renee Castellón Cordón
- Birth name: Stephanie Renee Castellon
- Date of birth: 27 August 1992 (age 34)
- Place of birth: Newport Beach, California, United States
- Height: 1.65 m (5 ft 5 in)
- Position: Goalkeeper

Youth career
- Riverside Polytechnic High School
- Legends FC

College career
Years	Team	Apps	(Gls)
2010–2014	Houston Baptist Huskies	20	(0)

International career^{‡}
2010–2012	Guatemala U20	3	(0)
2010	Guatemala	5	(0)
- ‡ National team caps and goals as of 6 March 2012

Stephanie Renee Castellón Cordón (born 27 August 1992) is a Guatemalan retired footballer who played as a goalkeeper. She has been a member of the Guatemala women's national team.

== Early life ==
Castellón was raised in Riverside, California.

== College career ==
Castellón attended the Houston Baptist University in Houston, Texas.

== International career ==
Castellón capped for Guatemala at senior level during the 2010 CONCACAF Women's World Cup Qualifying qualification and the 2010 Central American and Caribbean Games.
