= Tanya Samarzich =

American-born Mexican footballer (born 1994)

Personal information
- Full name: Tanya Nicole Samarzich Ruiz
- Date of birth: 28 December 1994 (age 31)
- Place of birth: West Covina, California, United States
- Height: 1.73 m (5 ft 8 in)
- Position: Forward

College career
Years	Team	Apps	(Gls)
2013	USC Trojans		
2015–2018	Kentucky Wildcats		

Senior career*
Years	Team	Apps	(Gls)
2019–2020	Monterrey	12	(0)

International career^{‡}
2010	Mexico U17	6	(3)
2012–2014	Mexico U20	11	(5)
2011–2017	Mexico	10	(1)
- * Club domestic league appearances and goals as of 13 September 2019 ‡ National team caps and goals as of 21:42, 20 March 2015 (UTC)

Tanya Nicole Samarzich Ruiz (born 28 December 1994) is a former American-born Mexican footballer who last played as a forward for Liga MX Femenil club CF Monterrey. She was a member of the Mexico women's national team.

== Early life ==
Samarzich was born in West Covina, California and raised in nearby Upland to a Serbian father and a Mexican mother.

== Personal life ==
After retirement, she became a middle school P.E. teacher and a coach for California Athletic SC, a youth club based in Southern California.
