= Football at the 2015 Pan American Games – Women's team squads =

This article shows the rosters of all participating teams at the women's football tournament at the 2015 Pan American Games in Toronto. Rosters could have a maximum of 18 athletes.

== Group A ==
=== Argentina ===
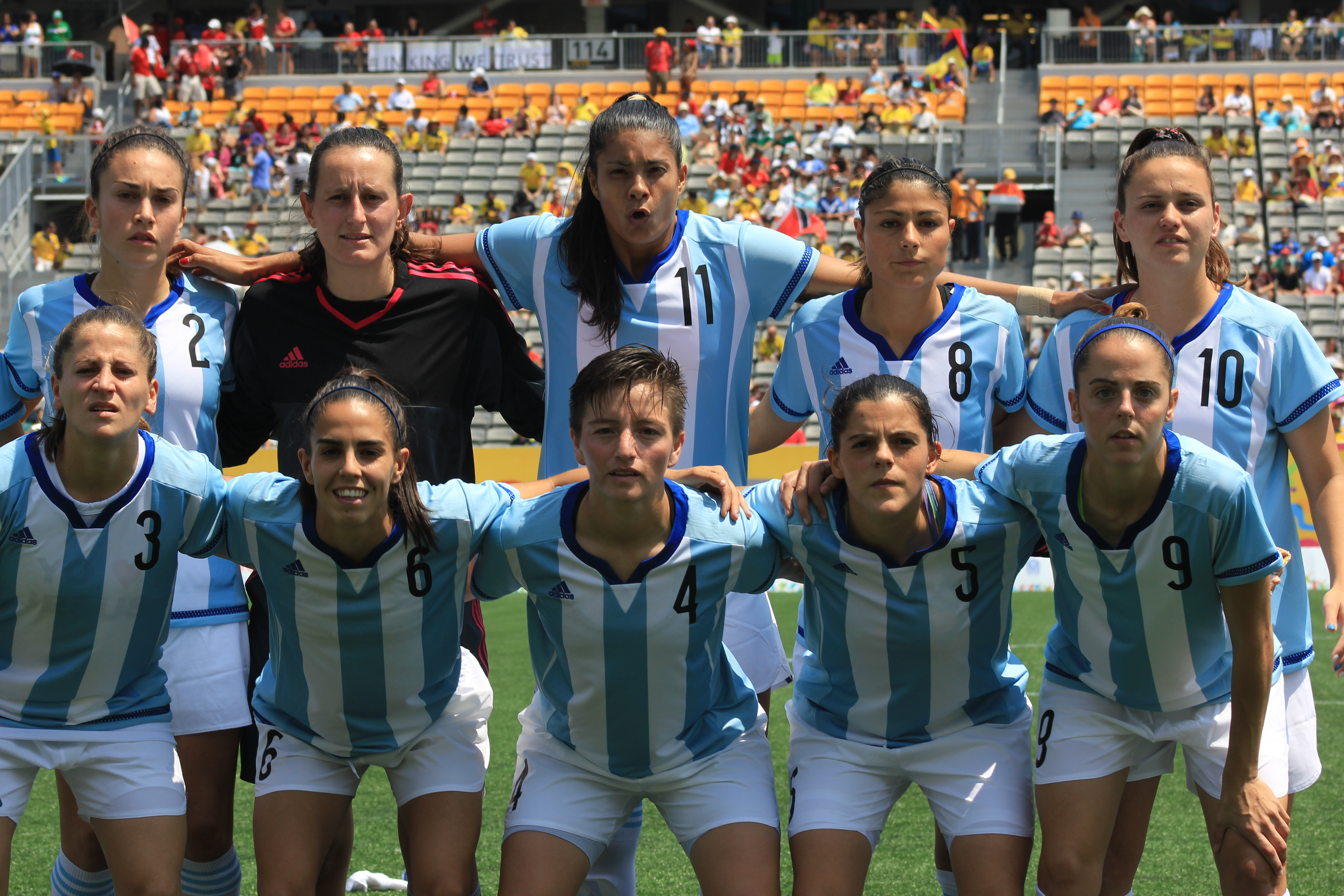
Team Argentina 2015

2015 Pan Am games Canada vs Columbia Laslovarga (11).jpg

Head coach: (Argentina) Julio Olarticoechea

No.	Pos.	Player	Date of birth (age)	Club
1	GK	Elisabeth Minnig	6 January 1987 (aged 28)	(Argentine Football Association) Boca Juniors
12	GK	Gaby Garton	27 May 1990 (aged 25)	(Argentine Football Association) River Plate
2	DF	Agustina Barroso	20 May 1993 (aged 22)	(Argentine Football Association) UAI Urquiza
3	DF	Alana García	1 March 1989 (aged 26)	(Argentine Football Association) UAI Urquiza
4	DF	Noelia Espíndola	6 April 1992 (aged 23)	(Argentine Football Association) San Lorenzo
5	MF	Florencia Quiñones	26 August 1986 (aged 28)	(Royal Spanish Football Federation) FC Barcelona
6	DF	Cecilia Ghigo	16 January 1995 (aged 20)	(Argentine Football Association) Boca Juniors
7	MF	Yael Oviedo	22 May 1992 (aged 23)	(Brazilian Football Confederation) Foz Cataratas
8	MF	Vanesa Santana	3 September 1990 (aged 24)	(Argentine Football Association) Boca Juniors
9	FW	Mariana Larroquette	24 October 1992 (aged 22)	(Argentine Football Association) River Plate
10	FW	Florencia Bonsegundo	14 July 1993 (aged 21)	(Argentine Football Association) UAI Urquiza
11	MF	Sole Jaimes	20 January 1989 (aged 26)	(Brazilian Football Confederation) Foz Cataratas
13	DF	Carmen Brusca	7 December 1985 (aged 29)	(Argentine Football Association) Boca Juniors
14	DF	Adriana Sachs	25 December 1993 (aged 21)	(Argentine Football Association) Club Atlético Huracán
15	DF	Camila Gómez Ares	26 October 1994 (aged 20)	(Argentine Football Association) Boca Juniors
16	MF	Karen Vénica	25 January 1992 (aged 23)	(Argentine Football Association) UAI Urquiza
17	FW	Fabiana Vallejos (c)	30 July 1985 (aged 29)	(Argentine Football Association) Boca Juniors
18	FW	Belén Potassa	12 December 1988 (aged 26)	(Argentine Football Association) UAI Urquiza

=== Colombia ===
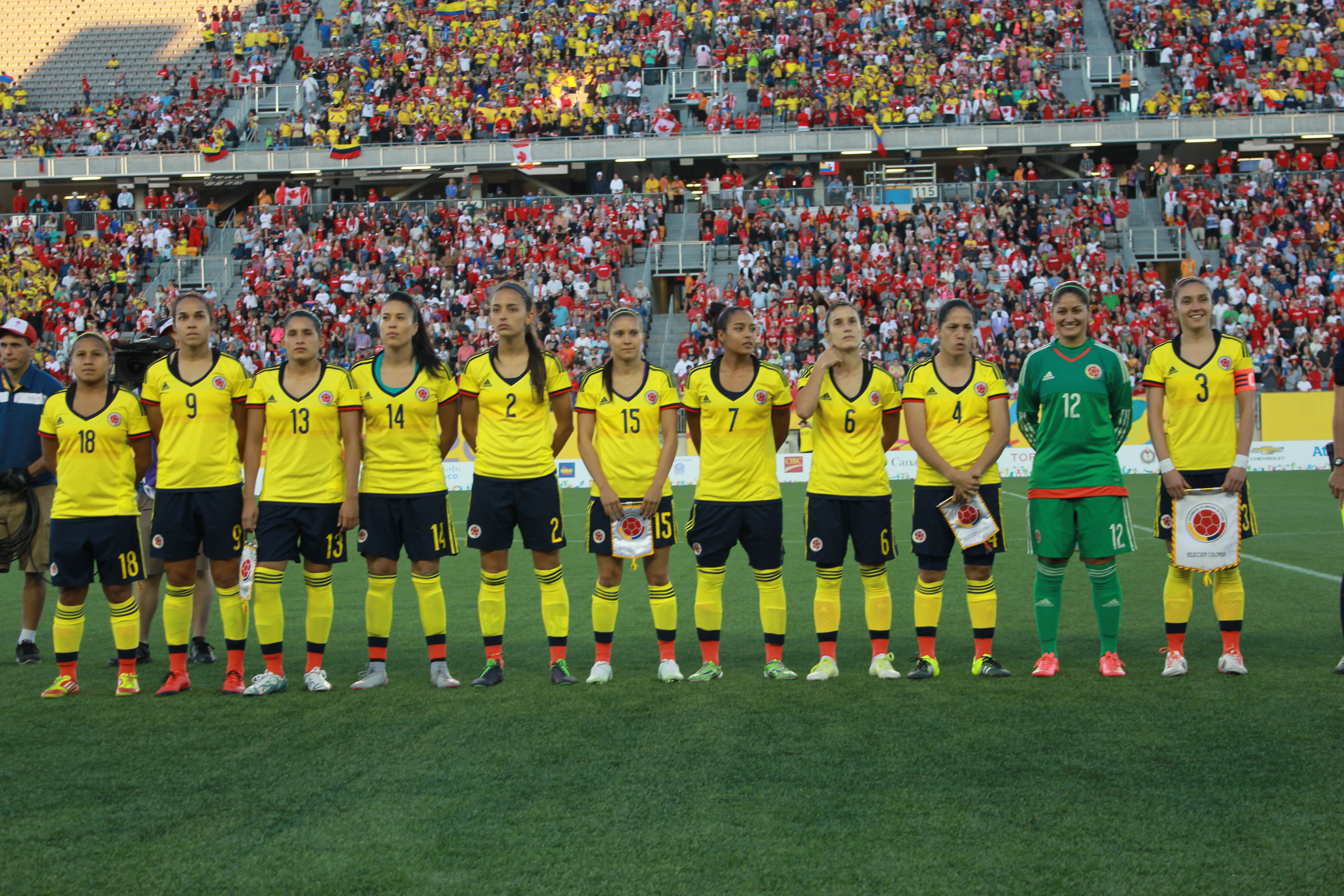
Team Colombia 2015

Head coach: Felipe Taborda

No.	Pos.	Player	Date of birth (age)	Club
1	GK	Paula Forero	25 January 1992 (aged 23)	(United States Soccer Federation) Barry University
12	GK	Sandra Sepúlveda	3 March 1988 (aged 27)	(Colombian Football Federation) Club Formas Íntimas
22	GK	Stefany Castaño	11 January 1994 (aged 21)	(United States Soccer Federation) Graceland University
2	DF	Isabella Echeverri	16 June 1994 (aged 21)	(United States Soccer Federation) University of Toledo
3	MF	Natalia Gaitán (c)	3 April 1991 (aged 24)	(Colombian Football Federation) Club Gol Star
4	MF	Diana Ospina	3 March 1989 (aged 26)	(Colombian Football Federation) Club Formas Íntimas
6	MF	Daniela Montoya	22 August 1990 (aged 24)	(Colombian Football Federation) Club Formas Íntimas
7	FW	Ingrid Vidal	22 April 1991 (aged 24)	(Colombian Football Federation) Generaciones Palmiranas
8	MF	Mildrey Pineda	1 October 1989 (aged 25)	(Colombian Football Federation) Generaciones Palmiranas
9	FW	Oriánica Velásquez	1 August 1989 (aged 25)	(Colombian Football Federation) Club Gol Star
11	MF	Catalina Usme	25 December 1989 (aged 25)	(Colombian Football Federation) Club Formas Íntimas
13	DF	Ángela Clavijo	1 September 1993 (aged 21)	(Colombian Football Federation) Kamatsa
14	DF	Nataly Arias	2 April 1986 (aged 29)	(United States Soccer Federation) Atlanta Silverbacks
15	DF	Tatiana Ariza	21 February 1991 (aged 24)	(Colombian Football Federation) Club Gol Star
17	DF	Carolina Arias	2 September 1990 (aged 24)	(Colombian Football Federation) Generaciones Palmirinas
18	MF	Leicy Santos	16 May 1996 (aged 19)	(Colombian Football Federation) Club Besser

=== Mexico ===
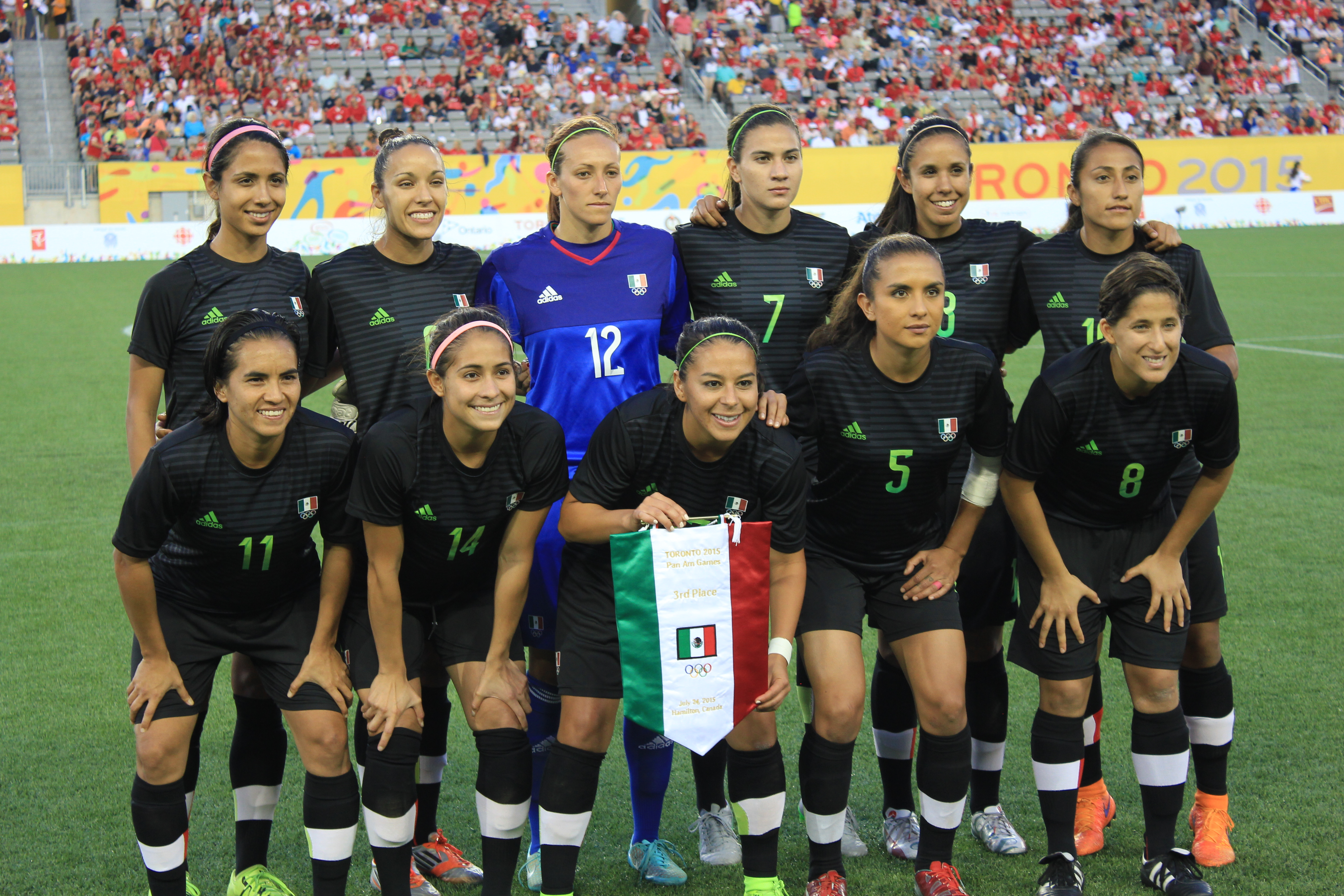
Team Mexico 2015

Head coach: (Mexico) Leonardo Cuellar

No.	Pos.	Player	Date of birth (age)	Club
1	GK	Cecilia Santiago	19 October 1994 (aged 20)	(United States Soccer Federation) FC Kansas City
12	GK	Pamela Tajonar	2 December 1984 (aged 30)	(Royal Spanish Football Federation) Sevilla FC
2	DF	Kenti Robles	15 February 1991 (aged 24)	(Royal Spanish Football Federation) RCD Espanyol
3	DF	Christina Murillo	28 January 1993 (aged 22)	(United States Soccer Federation) University of Michigan
4	DF	Greta Espinoza	5 June 1995 (aged 20)	(United States Soccer Federation) Sedona FC Strikers
5	DF	Valeria Miranda	18 August 1992 (aged 22)	(Mexican Football Federation) UNAM
6	MF	Jennifer Ruiz	9 August 1983 (aged 31)	(United States Soccer Federation) Seattle Reign FC
7	MF	Nayeli Rangel	28 February 1992 (aged 23)	(United States Soccer Federation) Sky Blue FC
8	MF	Teresa Noyola	15 April 1990 (aged 25)	(United States Soccer Federation) Houston Dash
9	MF	Nancy Antonio	2 April 1996 (aged 19)	(Mexican Football Federation) MacroSoccer
10	MF	Stephany Mayor	23 September 1991 (aged 23)	(Mexican Football Federation) UDLA
11	MF	Mónica Ocampo	4 January 1987 (aged 28)	(United States Soccer Federation) Sky Blue FC
13	DF	Bianca Sierra	25 June 1992 (aged 23)	(United States Soccer Federation) Boston Breakers
14	DF	Arianna Romero	29 July 1992 (aged 22)	(United States Soccer Federation) Washington Spirit
15	MF	Monica Alvarado	11 January 1991 (aged 24)	(United States Soccer Federation) Texas Christian University
16	MF	Fabiola Ibarra	2 February 1994 (aged 21)	(Mexican Football Federation) Tijuana
17	MF	Verónica Pérez	18 May 1988 (aged 27)	(United States Soccer Federation) Washington Spirit
18	MF	Maria Sánchez	20 February 1996 (aged 19)	(United States Soccer Federation) Idaho State Bengals

=== Trinidad and Tobago ===
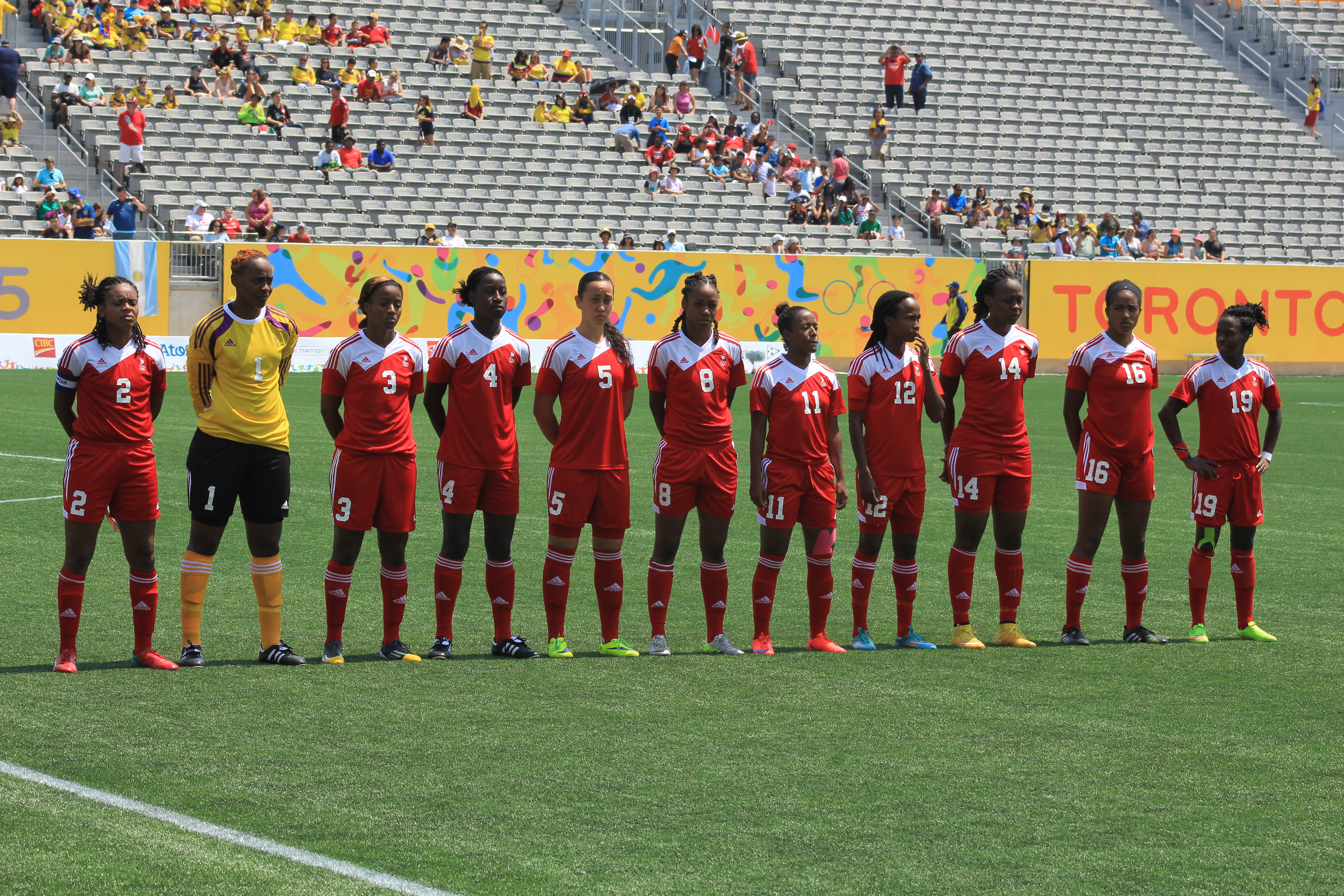
Team Trinidad and Tobago 2015

Head coach: (Trinidad and Tobago) Ross Rusel

No.	Pos.	Player	Date of birth (age)	Club
1	GK	Kimika Forbes	26 August 1990 (aged 24)	(United States Soccer Federation) Boston Breakers
21	GK	Shalette Alexander	20 December 1993 (aged 21)	(Trinidad and Tobago Football Association) Wiley University
2	DF	Ayana Russell	16 March 1988 (aged 27)	(Trinidad and Tobago Football Association) Malic FC
3	FW	Mariah Shade	9 December 1991 (aged 23)	(Trinidad and Tobago Football Association) Petrotrin
4	DF	Rhea Belgrave	19 July 1991 (aged 23)	(United States Soccer Federation) West Texas A&M
5	DF	Arin King	2 August 1991 (aged 23)	(Canadian Soccer Association) GS United
8	DF	Patrice Superville	8 April 1987 (aged 28)	(Trinidad and Tobago Football Association) St. Ann Rangers
11	MF	Janine François	1 January 1989 (aged 26)	(Trinidad and Tobago Football Association) Real Dimension
12	FW	Ahkeela Mollon	2 April 1985 (aged 30)	(Trinidad and Tobago Football Association) Rush Soccer Club
14	MF	Karin Forbes	27 August 1991 (aged 23)	(United States Soccer Federation) Civic/Pioneers
16	DF	Brianna Ryce	25 January 1994 (aged 21)	(United States Soccer Federation) DePaul University
19	FW	Kennya Cordner	11 December 1988 (aged 26)	(United States Soccer Federation) Seattle Sounders Women
6	MF	Khadidra Debesette	1 June 1995 (aged 20)	(Trinidad and Tobago Football Association) La Brea Angels
9	FW	Maylee Atthin Johnson	5 September 1986 (aged 28)	(Trinidad and Tobago Football Association)
10	FW	Tasha St. Louis	20 December 1983 (aged 31)	(Swedish Football Association) Sunnanå SK
13	FW	Shenelle Henry	13 March 1994 (aged 21)	(Trinidad and Tobago Football Association) Real Dimension
15	DF	Lauryn Hutchinson	12 June 1991 (aged 24)	(Trinidad and Tobago Football Association) Richmond United
7	FW	Demelle Mascall	20 October 1988 (aged 26)	(Trinidad and Tobago Football Association) Petrotrin

  - (Nº9)Maylee Atthin Johnson MF 05/09/1986 Angels Football Club (Trinidad and Tobago)

== Group B ==
=== Brazil ===
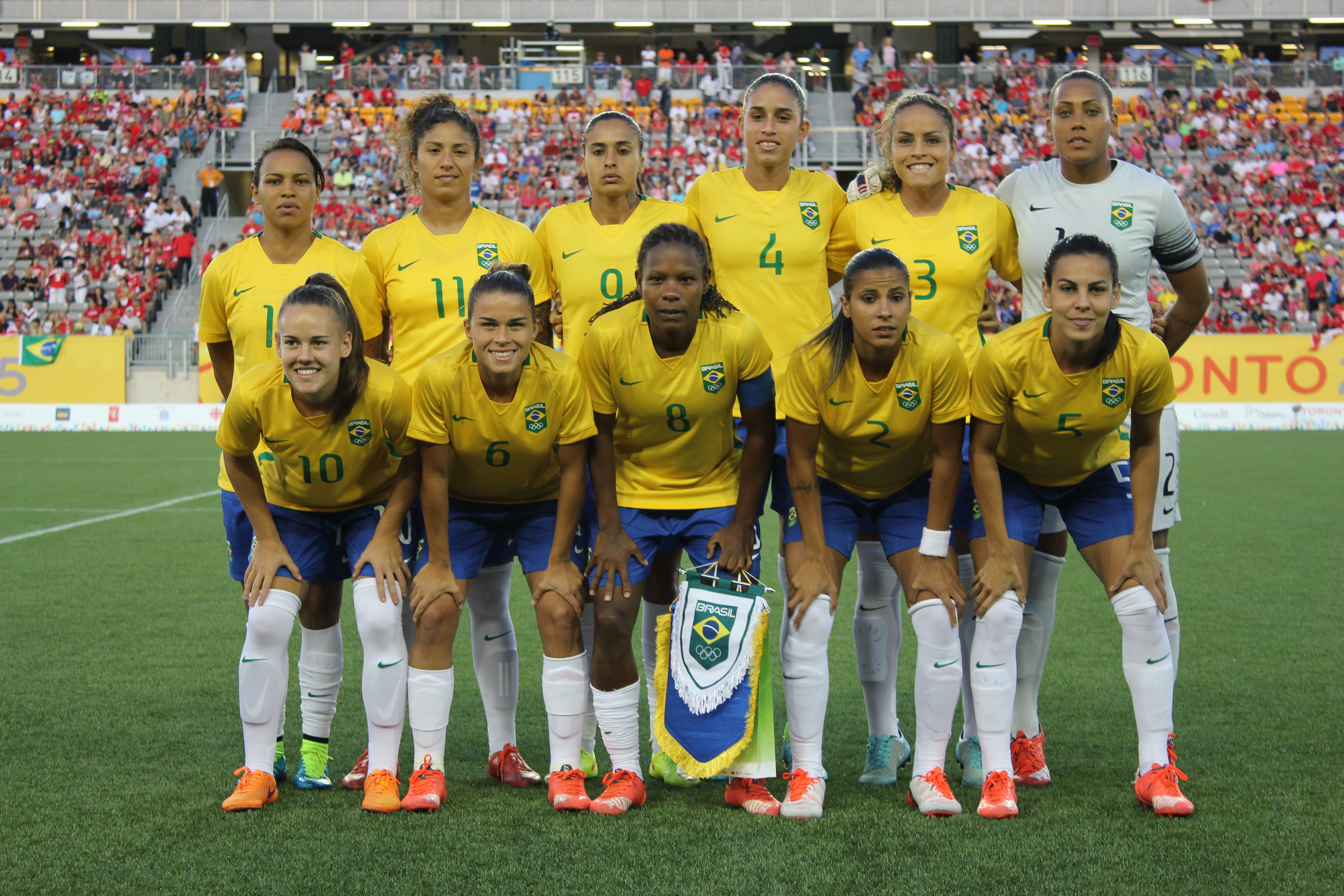
Team Brazil 2015

Head coach: (Brazil) Vadão

No.	Pos.	Player	Date of birth (age)	Club
1	GK	Luciana	24 July 1987 (aged 27)	(Brazilian Football Confederation) Ferroviária
12	GK	Bárbara	4 July 1988 (aged 27)	(Swedish Football Association) Sunnanå SK
2	DF	Fabiana	4 July 1989 (aged 26)	(Brazilian Football Confederation) Centro Olímpico
3	DF	Monica	21 April 1987 (aged 28)	(Brazilian Football Confederation) Ferroviária
4	DF	Rafaelle	18 June 1991 (aged 24)	(United States Soccer Federation) Houston Dash
5	MF	Thaisa	17 December 1988 (aged 26)	(Brazilian Football Confederation) Ferroviária
6	MF	Tamires	10 October 1987 (aged 27)	(Brazilian Football Confederation) Centro Olímpico
8	MF	Formiga	3 March 1978 (aged 37)	(Brazilian Football Confederation) São Joséa
9	MF	Andressa Alves	10 November 1992 (aged 22)	(French Football Federation) Montpellier
10	MF	Andressa Machry	1 May 1995 (aged 20)	(Brazilian Football Confederation) Kindermann
11	MF	Cristiane	15 May 1985 (aged 30)	(Brazilian Football Confederation) Centro Olímpico
17	MF	Raquel	21 March 1991 (aged 24)	(Brazilian Football Confederation) Ferroviária
7	FW	Maurine	14 January 1986 (aged 29)	(Brazilian Football Confederation) Ferroviária
13	DF	Poliana	6 February 1991 (aged 24)	(United States Soccer Federation) Houston Dash
14	DF	Érika	4 February 1988 (aged 27)	(Brazilian Football Confederation) Centro Olímpico
15	MF	Gabi	28 February 1985 (aged 30)	(Brazilian Football Confederation) Centro Olímpico
16	MF	Darlene	11 January 1990 (aged 25)	(Brazilian Football Confederation) Centro Olímpico
18	DF	Géssica	19 March 1991 (aged 24)	(Brazilian Football Confederation) Ferroviária

=== Canada ===
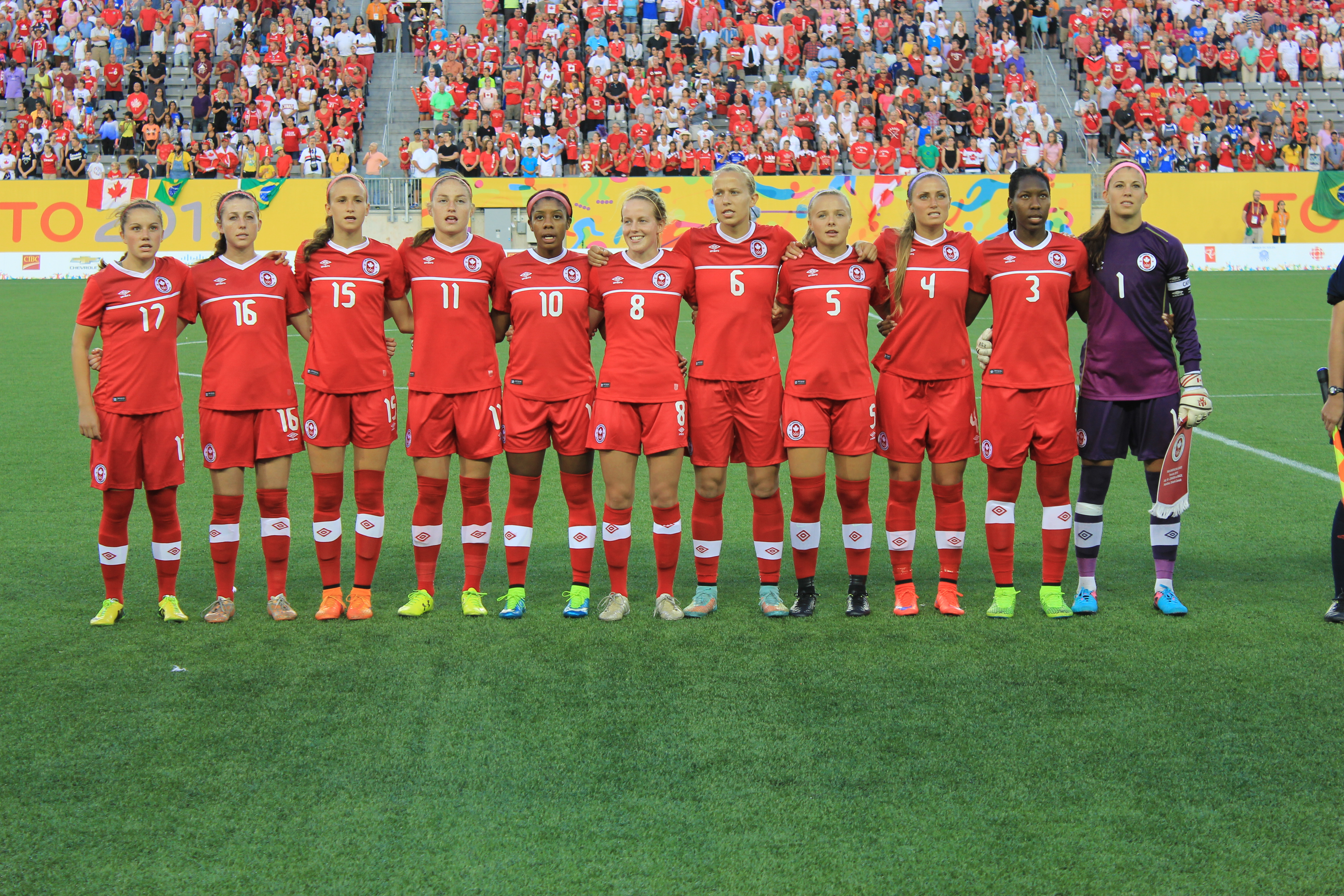
Team Canada 2015

Head coach: (Canada) Daniel Worthington

The following players are on the roster for the 2015 Pan American Games. Stats are accurate through July 11 games against Ecuador.

No.	Pos.	Player	Date of birth (age)	Caps	Goals	Club
1	GK	Stephanie Labbé	10 October 1986 (aged 28)	21	0	(Swedish Football Association) KIF Örebro
18	GK	Kailen Sheridan	16 July 1995 (aged 19)	1	0	(United States Soccer Federation) Clemson University
2	DF	Victoria Pickett	12 August 1996 (aged 18)	1	0	(Canadian Soccer Association) Glen Shields SC
3	DF	Kadeisha Buchanan	5 November 1995 (aged 19)	41	2	(United States Soccer Federation) West Virginia
4	DF	Shelina Zadorsky	24 August 1992 (aged 22)	2	2	(Swedish Football Association) Vittsjo
5	DF	Kinley McNicoll	17 April 1994 (aged 21)	1	0	(United States Soccer Federation) Wisconsin
6	DF	Quinn (Note: Then known as Rebecca Quinn)	11 August 1995 (aged 19)	10	0	(United States Soccer Federation) Duke
7	MF	Danica Wu	13 August 1992 (aged 22)	3	0	(German Football Association) Herforder SV
8	MF	Emma Fletcher	4 February 1995 (aged 20)	1	1	(United States Soccer Federation) Cal Berkeley
9	FW	Sarah Stratikagis	7 March 1999 (aged 16)	0	0	(Canadian Soccer Association) Woodbridge Strikers
10	MF	Ashley Lawrence	11 June 1995 (aged 20)	24	1	(United States Soccer Federation) West Virginia
11	FW	Janine Beckie	20 August 1994 (aged 20)	7	3	(United States Soccer Federation) Texas Tech
12	FW	Nkem Ezurike	19 March 1992 (aged 23)	5	0	(United States Soccer Federation) Boston Breakers
13	MF	Sarah Kinzner	28 August 1997 (aged 17)	1	0	(Canadian Soccer Association) Calgary Foothills
14	FW	Gabrielle Carle	12 August 1998 (aged 16)	1	0	(Canadian Soccer Association) Dynamo de Quebec
15	FW	Marie Levasseur	18 May 1997 (aged 18)	1	0	(Canadian Soccer Association) Dynamo de Quebec
16	DF	Chelsea Stewart	28 April 1990 (aged 25)	44	0	(United States Soccer Federation) Western New York Flash
17	MF	Jessie Fleming	11 March 1998 (aged 17)	19	1	(Canadian Soccer Association) Nor'West SC
19	FW	Nichelle Prince	19 February 1995 (aged 20)	3	1	(United States Soccer Federation) Ohio State

=== Costa Rica ===
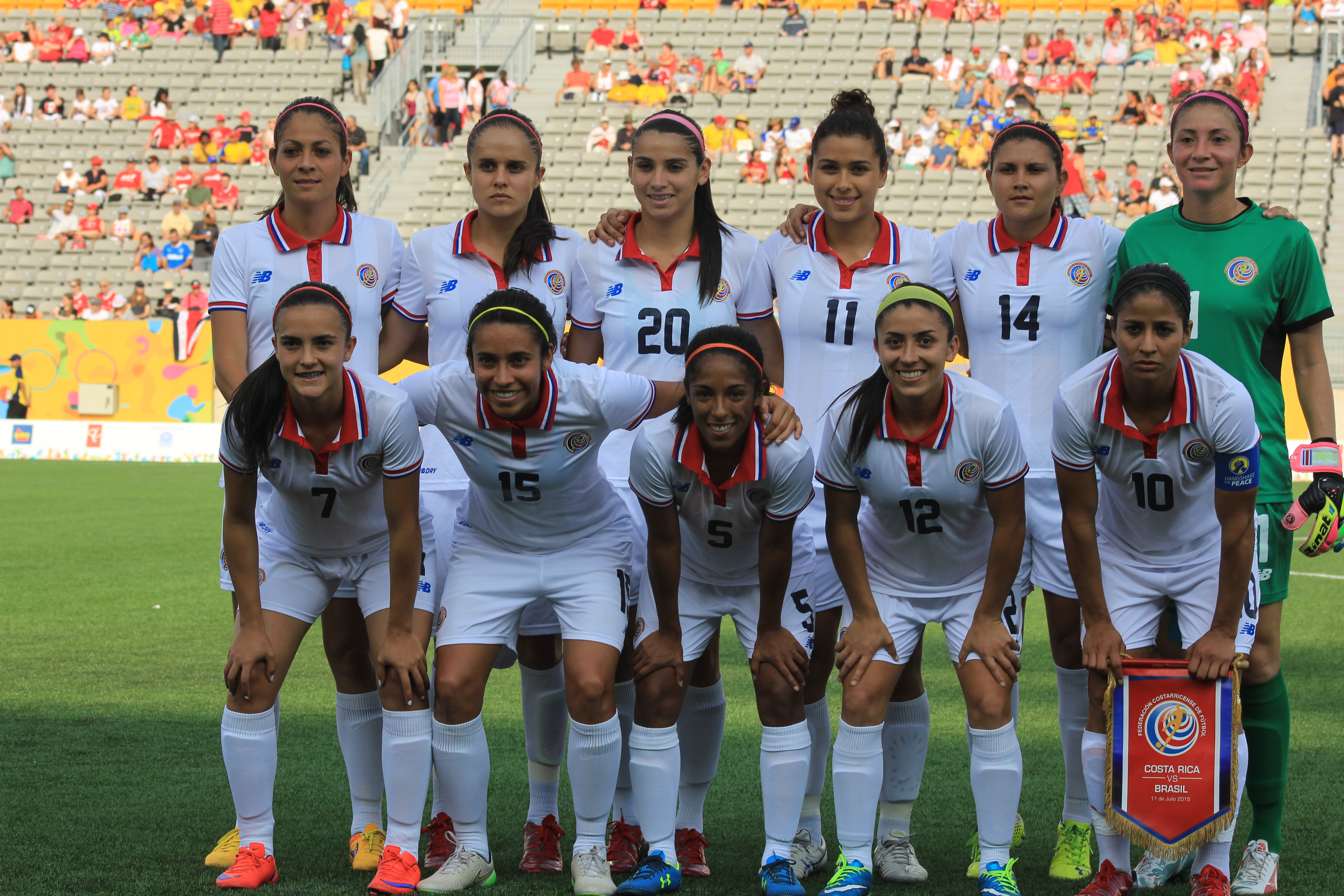
Team Costa Rica 2015

Head coach: (Costa Rica) Amelia Valverde

The following players are on the roster for the 2015 Pan American Games.

No.	Pos.	Player	Date of birth (age)	Caps	Goals	Club
1	GK	Dinnia Díaz	14 January 1988 (aged 27)	21	0	(Costa Rican Football Federation) UD Moravia
18	GK	Yirlania Arroyo	28 May 1986 (aged 29)	40	0	(United States Soccer Federation) Sky Blue FC
5	DF	Diana Sáenz	15 April 1989 (aged 26)	48	0	(United States Soccer Federation) Univ. of South Florida
6	DF	Carol Sánchez	16 April 1986 (aged 29)	33	2	(Costa Rican Football Federation) UD Moravia
7	FW	Melissa Herrera	10 October 1996 (aged 18)	20	12	(Costa Rican Football Federation) Deportivo Saprissa
10	MF	Shirley Cruz (c)	28 August 1985 (aged 29)	60	21	(French Football Federation) Paris Saint-Germain
11	FW	Raquel Rodríguez	28 October 1993 (aged 21)	37	24	(United States Soccer Federation) Pennsylvania State Univ.
12	DF	Lixy Rodríguez	4 November 1990 (aged 24)	47	2	(Costa Rican Football Federation) L.D. Alajuelense
14	FW	Fernanda Barrantes	12 April 1989 (aged 26)	23	21	(Costa Rican Football Federation) UD Moravia
15	MF	Cristín Granados	19 August 1989 (aged 25)	53	10	(Costa Rican Football Federation) Deportivo Saprissa
16	MF	Katherine Alvarado	11 April 1991 (aged 24)	47	18	(Costa Rican Football Federation) Deportivo Saprissa
20	FW	Wendy Acosta	19 December 1989 (aged 25)	38	18	(Costa Rican Football Federation) UD Moravia
3	MF	Gloriana Villalobos	20 August 1999 (aged 15)	12	2	(Costa Rican Football Federation) Deportivo Saprissa
4	DF	Mariana Benavides	26 December 1994 (aged 20)	12	4	(Costa Rican Football Federation) C.S. Herediano
8	DF	Daniela Cruz	8 March 1991 (aged 24)	33	6	(Costa Rican Football Federation) Deportivo Saprissa
9	FW	Carolina Venegas	28 October 1991 (aged 23)	35	15	(Costa Rican Football Federation) Deportivo Saprissa
17	FW	Karla Villalobos	16 July 1989 (aged 25)	9	6	(Costa Rican Football Federation) C.S. Herediano
19	DF	Fabiola Sánchez	9 April 1993 (aged 22)	10	3	(United States Soccer Federation) Martin Methodist Redhawks

=== Ecuador ===
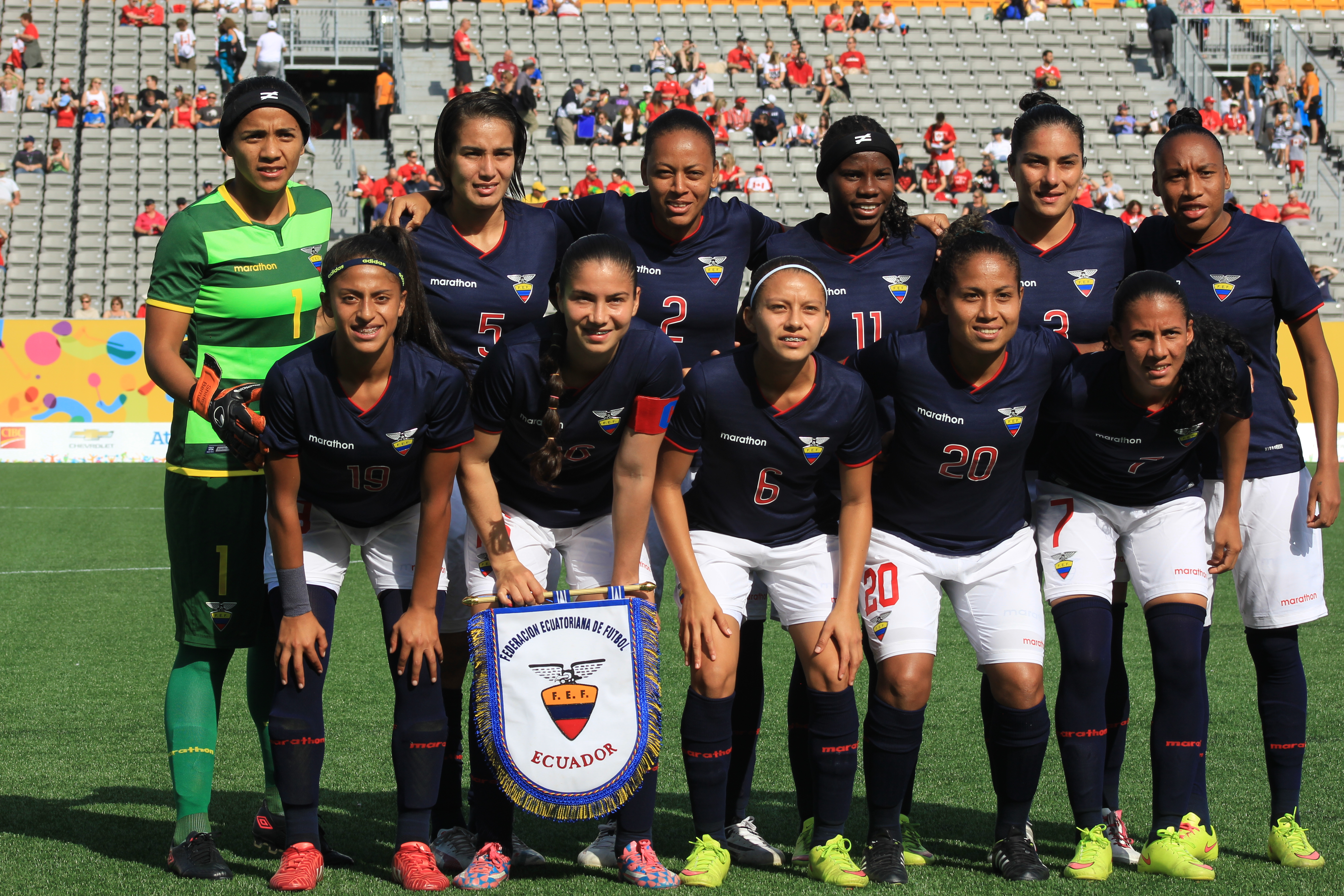
Team Ecuador 2015

Head coach: (Ecuador) Vanessa Arauz

The following players are on the roster for the 2015 Pan American Games.

No.	Pos.	Player	Date of birth (age)	Caps	Goals	Club
1	GK	Shirley Berruz	6 January 1991 (aged 24)	25	0	(Ecuadorian Football Federation) Rocafuerte Fútbol Club
12	GK	Andrea Vera	10 April 1993 (aged 22)	2	0	(Ecuadorian Football Federation) Universidad de Quito
2	DF	Katherine Ortíz	16 February 1991 (aged 24)	26	3	(Ecuadorian Football Federation) Rocafuerte Fútbol Club
3	DF	Nancy Aguilar	6 July 1985 (aged 30)	49	0	(Ecuadorian Football Federation) Atlético de Febrero
5	MF	Mayra Olivera	22 August 1992 (aged 22)	36	2	(Ecuadorian Football Federation) Atlético de Febrero
6	DF	Angie Ponce	14 July 1996 (aged 18)	31	5	(Ecuadorian Football Federation) Talleres Emanuel
7	DF	Ingrid Rodríguez	24 November 1991 (aged 23)	37	6	(Ecuadorian Football Federation) Unión Española
8	MF	Erika Vásquez	4 August 1992 (aged 22)	34	3	(Ecuadorian Football Federation) Unión Española
11	FW	Mónica Quinteros	5 July 1988 (aged 27)	45	8	(Ecuadorian Football Federation) Atlético de Febrero
16	DF	Ligia Moreira (c)	19 March 1992 (aged 23)	46	3	(Ecuadorian Football Federation) Atlético de Febrero
19	MF	Kerly Real	7 November 1998 (aged 16)	27	2	(Ecuadorian Football Federation) Espuce
20	FW	Denise Pesántes	14 January 1988 (aged 27)	35	3	(Ecuadorian Football Federation) Galápagos S.C.
9	FW	Giannina Lattanzio	19 May 1993 (aged 22)	14	0	(Ecuadorian Football Federation) Atlético de Febrero
13	MF	Madeleine Riera	7 August 1989 (aged 25)	34	0	(Ecuadorian Football Federation) Unión Española
14	FW	Carina Caicedo	23 July 1987 (aged 27)	9	1	(Ecuadorian Football Federation) Deportivo Quito
15	MF	Ana Palacios	16 February 1991 (aged 24)	31	0	(Ecuadorian Football Federation) Rocafuerte Fútbol Club
17	MF	Alexandra Salvador	11 August 1995 (aged 19)	14	0	(Ecuadorian Football Federation) Universidad de Quito
18	MF	Adriana Barré	4 April 1995 (aged 20)	24	0	(Ecuadorian Football Federation) Galápagos S.C.
