= Jessica Caro =

Colombian footballer (born 1988)

Personal information
- Full name: Jessica Caro García
- Date of birth: 20 July 1988 (age 38)
- Height: 1.62 m (5 ft 4 in)
- Position: Midfielder

Team information
- Current team: Generaciones Palmiranas

Senior career*
Years	Team	Apps	(Gls)
- Generaciones Palmiranas

International career^{‡}
2018–	Colombia	9	(0)
Medal record
Women's football
Representing Colombia
Pan American Games
Gold medal – first place	2019 Lima	Team
- * Club domestic league appearances and goals ‡ National team caps and goals as of 23 July 2018

Jessica Caro García (born 20 July 1988) is a Colombian footballer who plays as a midfielder for Generaciones Palmiranas and the Colombia women's national team.

== International career ==
Caro made her senior debut for Colombia during the 2018 Copa América Femenina.
