= Argentina women's national football team =

Women's national football team representing Argentina

Argentina
- Nickname(s): La Albiceleste (The White and Sky Blue)
- Association: AFA
- Confederation: CONMEBOL (South America)
- Head coach: Germán Portanova
- Captain: Aldana Cometti
- Most caps: Aldana Cometti (108)
- Top scorer: Florencia Bonsegundo (27)
- Home stadium: Various
- FIFA code: ARG
First colours	Second colours

FIFA ranking
- Current: 30 (20 October 2026)
- Highest: 27 (June 2008; September – December 2009)
- Lowest: 38 (October 2003 – March 2004 https://www.afa.com.ar/es/posts/categories/seleccion-femenina)

First international
- Argentina 3–2 Chile (Santiago, Chile; 3 December 1993)

Biggest win
- Argentina 12–0 Bolivia (Uberlândia, Brazil; 12 January 1995)

Biggest defeat
- Germany 11–0 Argentina (Shanghai, China; 10 September 2007)

World Cup
- Appearances: 4 (first in 2003)
- Best result: Group stage (2003, 2007, 2019, 2023)

Olympic Games
- Appearances: 1 (first in 2008)
- Best result: Group stage (2008)

Copa América Femenina
- Appearances: 9 (first in 1995)
- Best result: Champions (2006)

CONCACAF W Gold Cup
- Appearances: 1 (first in 2024)
- Best result: Quarter-finals (2024)
Medal record
Copa América Femenina
Gold medal – first place	2006 Argentina	Team
Silver medal – second place	1995 Brazil	Team
Silver medal – second place	1998 Argentina	Team
Silver medal – second place	2003 Peru	Team
Bronze medal – third place	2018 Chile	Team
Bronze medal – third place	2022 Colombia	Team
Bronze medal – third place	2025 Ecuador	Team
South American Games
Gold medal – first place	2014 Santiago	Team
Pan American Games
Silver medal – second place	2019 Lima	Team
- Website: afa.com.ar/seleccion-femenina

The Argentina women's national football team represents Argentina in international women's football. Like their men's counterpart, the women's team has been known or nicknamed "La Albiceleste" (The White and Sky Blue).

Women's football in Argentina remains largely in the shadow of the men's game in terms of play development and fan support; in women's sports in Argentina, field hockey and volleyball are also more popular. Almost all its members were amateur players until 1991, when the Campeonato de Fútbol Femenino was founded to increase football popularity among women in Argentina.

The Argentina–Brazil football rivalry in women's football cannot be compared to that of men, given the big differences between both countries; Brazil has the clear advantage in matches between them, and has been hosting a competitive professional women's league for many years, while Argentina only introduced it in 2019.

== History ==
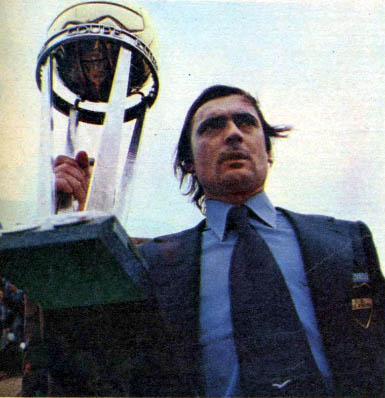
Rubén Suñé, the first coach of Argentina in their history

The team played its first official match against Chile at Estadio Santa Laura on 3 December 1993, which ended in a 3–2 victory. Coached by Rubén Suñé, the Argentina starting line-up was: Valeria Otero (Independiente); María Gérez (River), Gladys Rodriguez (Boca), Corina Riccheza (Boca), Marina Martinez (Boca); Otilia Del Valle Acuña (Boca), Patricia Vera (Sacachispas), María Elizabeth Villanueva (Boca), Karina Morales (River); Fabiana Ochotorena (Boca), Liliana Baca (Independiente).

Two years later, Argentina achieved its biggest win over Bolivia, winning 12–0 in a 1995 South American Women's Football Championship match, played at Estádio Parque do Sabiá. Argentina reached the final of that tournament, but lost to Brazil 2–0.

The team reached the final of the 1998 South American Women's Football Championship, losing to Brazil again, this time 7–1 in Mar del Plata. In the semi-finals, they beat Peru on penalties 4–3 in dramatic fashion, with the scores at 1–1 after extra time.

In the 2003 Pan American Games, the team reached the semi-finals, where Brazil won 2–1 in a tight match. In the Bronze Medal match, Argentina lost 4–1 to Mexico, and finished in fourth place. Despite a lack of investment and interest, the women's national team played its first World Cup in 2003. They were drawn in a group with Japan, Canada, and Germany; Argentina lost all three matches and scored only once; their lone score was Argentina's first official goal at a World Cup, scored by Yanina Gaitán.

After their World Cup debut, the team went undefeated for 14 matches from 2005 until 2007, including throughout the 2006 South American Cup, where they beat Brazil in the final 2–0 to become champions. Their run ended when they lost a friendly with China 1–0 in June 2007. Three days later, they got revenge, however, and beat China by the same score. Since the team won the South American Cup, there were high expectations for the 2007 World Cup, played in China. However, the squad lost all matches again, including a record 0–11 loss to Germany.

With the 2006 South American Cup title, the team qualified for the 2008 Summer Olympics, their Olympic debut. Argentina finished last with no points and only one goal in favor, although less goals were conceded than in the World Cup the previous year.

The team returned to play in the 2014 South American Games, with new coach Luis Nicosia, losing the opening match against Chile 1–0, but winning against Bolivia 4–0 and advancing to the semi-finals, where they won against rivals Brazil on penalties after a 0–0 draw. In the final, they won the gold medal with a 2–1 victory against Chile, meaning they won their first tournament since the 2006 South American Cup.

In the 2014 Copa América Femenina, the team finished second in their group, behind Brazil, with three wins and one loss, and qualified for the Final Stage. The top two teams in the final stage qualified for the 2015 Women's World Cup and 2016 Summer Olympics, and the third-placed team qualified for a CONCACAF-CONMEBOL playoff for World Cup qualification. Argentina finished last in the final stage and missed out on the World Cup and Olympics.

In 2016, the team effectively did not exist, as the officials were more interested in investing in the men's side. Following a long struggle for better treatment, the team was restarted in 2017, and its former coach Carlos Borrello was reappointed as coach of the side.

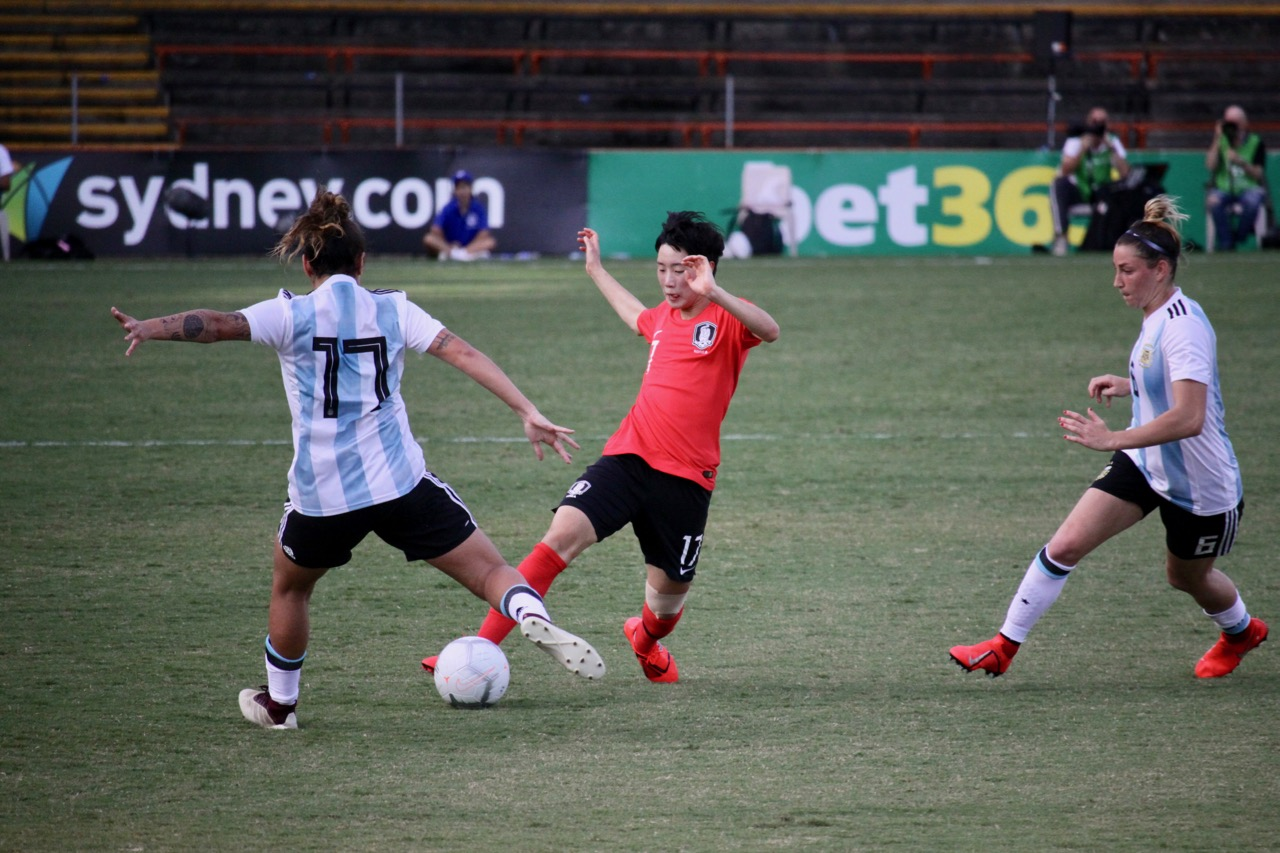
Argentina playing South Korea at the 2019 Cup of Nations

In 2018, Argentina finished third at the Copa América, which qualified them for the CONCACAF–CONMEBOL play-off. Argentina defeated the fourth-place finisher from the CONCACAF Championship, Panama, in a two-legged play-off in November 2018 to qualify for the 2019 FIFA Women's World Cup. In the team's debut, they managed a shocking 0–0 draw to Japan, former champions of 2011 FIFA Women's World Cup, and gained its first ever point in any Women's World Cup.

The next match was a narrow 1–0 loss to England, and then an exciting 3–3 draw to Scotland, after being down 3–0 with 25 minutes left. Although Argentina didn't qualify for the knockout stages, they put in a good performance, with two draws and one loss, finishing the tournament in the group's third place. The women's team's performance was deemed to be one of the country's watershed moments for the long neglected women's side, especially after the disappointing shows of the Argentine men's side in the 2018 FIFA World Cup and 2019 Copa América.

After the men's team winning the 2022 FIFA World Cup, it created an expectation of scoring the first ever victory at the 2023 FIFA Women's World Cup. However, they only managed a 0–1 loss to Italy, a 2–2 draw to South Africa and a 0–2 loss to Sweden, finishing the tournament in the last place of the group stage.

On 27 and 28 May 2024, Lorena Benítez, Julieta Cruz, Laurina Oliveros and Eliana Stábile withdrew from the national team after a dispute with the Argentine Football Association over a lack of pay, mistreatment and injustices they have faced in the past and continue to endure to this day. However, Stábile would later reconsider her decision, returning to the team.

== Results and fixtures ==
The following is a list of match results in the last 12 months, as well as any future matches that have been scheduled.

Legend

Win Draw Loss Fixture

=== 2025 ===
2 December Liga de Naciones	Argentina	8–0	Bolivia	Banfield, Argentina
20:00 UTC−3	Gramaglia 7', 51'; Cometti 31'; Bonsegundo 43' (pen.), 90+4'; Núñez 60', 89'; Altgelt 73'	Report (FIFA)		Stadium: Estadio Florencio Sola; Referee: Nadia Fuques (Uruguay)

=== 2026 ===
1 March 2026 SheBelieves Cup	United States	2–0	Argentina	Nashville, United States
	Heaps 20'; Shaw 56'	Report		Stadium: Geodis Park; Attendance: 17,125; Referee: Timothy Derry (Trinidad and Tobago)

4 March 2026 SheBelieves Cup	Argentina	0–1	Colombia	Columbus, United States
		Report	Caicedo 64'	Stadium: ScottsMiracle-Gro Field; Attendance: 17,125; Referee: Katja Koroleva (United States)

7 March 2026 SheBelieves Cup	Canada	0–0 (3–2 p)	Argentina	Harrison, United States
		Report		Stadium: Sports Illustrated Stadium; Referee: Alyssa Pennington (United States)
	Penalties
	Huitema (penalty missed); Fleming (penalty scored); Sonis (penalty scored); Grosso (penalty scored)		(penalty missed) Cometti; (penalty missed) Braun; (penalty scored) Holzeier; (penalty scored) Vargas; (penalty missed) Preininger

10 April Liga de Naciones	Chile	0–1	Argentina	Valparaíso, Chile
20:00 UTC−4		Report	Bonsegundo 42' (pen.)	Stadium: Estadio Elías Figueroa Brander; Referee: Charly Deretti (Brazil)

14 April Liga de Naciones	Venezuela	1–2	Argentina	Cabudare, Venezuela
19:00 UTC−4	Olivieri 86'	Report	Holzheier 7'; Bonsegundo 57'	Stadium: Estadio Metropolitano de Cabudare; Referee: Brenda Cisternas (Chile)

18 April Liga de Naciones	Argentina	0–0	Colombia	Lanús, Argentina
20:00 UTC−3		Report		Stadium: Estadio Ciudad de Lanús; Referee: Emikar Calderas (Venezuela)

5 June Liga de Naciones	Argentina	1–1	Peru	Florida, Argentina (Note: The Argentina v Peru match, originally scheduled to be played at Estadio Florencio Sola, Banfield, was relocated to Estadio Ciudad de Vicente López, Florida.)
20:00 UTC−3	Diz 75'	Report	Cox 85'	Stadium: Estadio Ciudad de Vicente López; Referee: Zulma Quiñónez (Paraguay)

9 June Liga de Naciones	Ecuador	0–1	Argentina	Quito, Ecuador
18:00 UTC−5		Report (FIFA); Report (CONMEBOL)	Bonsegundo 90+5'	Stadium: Estadio Olímpico Atahualpa; Referee: Edina Alves (Brazil)

10 October Friendly	Brazil	3–1	Argentina	Porto Alegre, Brazil
16:30 UTC−3	Luany 27'; Geyse 39'; Angelina 45+1'	Report	Pereyra 51'	Stadium: Estádio Beira-Rio; Attendance: 28,386; Referee: Erika Monserrat González Nevarez (Mexico)

13 October Friendly	Brazil	2–2	Argentina	São Lourenço da Mata, Brazil
20:30 UTC−3	Bia Zaneratto 13'; Gio Queiroz 28'	Report	Falfán 35'; Bonsegundo 55' (pen.)	Stadium: Arena Pernambuco; Referee: Erika Monserrat González Nevarez (Mexico)

29 November Friendly	Argentina	v	Germany	La Plata, Argentina
20:15 UTC−3		Report		Stadium: Estadio Único Diego Armando Maradona

- Argentina Results and Fixtures – Soccerway.com

== Coaching staff ==
=== Current coaching staff ===
As of 7 July 2023.

Position	Name
Head coach	(Argentina) Germán Portanova
Assistant coach	(Argentina) Franco Caponetto
Assistant coach	(Argentina) Sebastián Gómez
Fitness coach	(Argentina) Osvaldo Conte
Goalkeeping coach	(Argentina) Carlos Canuhe
Video analysis	(Argentina) Nicolás Valado

=== Manager history ===
- (Argentina) Norberto Rozas (1971) (Note: Rozas coached Argentina at the unofficial 1971 Women's World Cup.)
- (Argentina) Rubén Suñé (1993–1994)
- (Argentina) Rubén Torres (1995)
- (Argentina) Raúl Rodríguez Seoane (1997–1998)
- (Argentina) Carlos Borrello (1998–2012)
- (Argentina) Luis Nicosia & (Argentina) Ezequiel Nicosia (2013–2014) (Note: Sources differ about the head coach: Luis Nicosia is cited as the manager and Ezequiel Nicosia is said to be part of the coaching staff in news reports. In official match reports, the latter is cited as the head coach. However, articles from AFA and CONMEBOL refer to both as the head coaches.)
- (Argentina) Julio Olarticoechea (2014–2015)
- (Argentina) Carlos Borrello (2017–2021)
- (Argentina) Germán Portanova (2021–)

== Players ==
=== Current squad ===
The following players were called up for the 2025–26 CONMEBOL Liga de Naciones matches against Peru and Ecuador on 5 and 9 June 2026, respectively.

Caps and goals correct as of 18 April 2026, after the match against Columbia.

No.	Pos.	Player	Date of birth (age)	Caps	Goals	Club
1	GK	Solana Pereyra	5 April 1999 (age 27)	32	0	(Argentine Football Association) San Lorenzo
1	GK	Priscila Siben	3 April 2007 (age 19)	0	0	(Argentine Football Association) Boca Juniors
12	GK	Lara Esponda	8 November 2005 (age 21)	3	0	(Argentine Football Association) River Plate
23	GK	Abigaíl Chaves	11 July 1997 (age 29)	2	0	(Turkish Football Federation) Fenerbahçe
2	DF	Adriana Sachs	25 December 1993 (age 32)	48	0	(Argentine Football Association) Racing
3	DF	Eliana Stabile	26 November 1993 (age 32)	86	6	(Argentine Football Association) Boca Juniors
4	DF	Catalina Roggerone	3 April 2003 (age 23)	19	0	(United States Soccer Federation) CSUB Roadrunners
4	DF	Abril Reche	4 April 2001 (age 25)	2	0	(Argentine Football Association) Racing
6	DF	Aldana Cometti (captain)	3 March 1996 (age 30)	108	11	(United States Soccer Federation) Bay FC
13	DF	Sophia Braun	26 January 2000 (age 26)	58	2	(United States Soccer Federation) Spokane Zephyr FC
14	DF	Milagros Martín	26 April 2007 (age 19)	25	0	(Royal Spanish Football Federation) UD Tenerife
16	DF	Sofía Domínguez	16 December 2005 (age 20)	27	0	(Swiss Football Association) FC Basel
5	MF	Vanina Preininger	26 September 1996 (age 30)	32	0	(Argentine Football Association) San Lorenzo
7	MF	Justina Morcillo	9 August 2000 (age 26)	9	0	(Royal Spanish Football Federation) Dux Logroño
8	MF	Daiana Falfán	14 October 2000 (age 26)	62	1	(Royal Spanish Football Federation) Dux Logroño
10	MF	Maricel Pereyra	11 May 2002 (age 24)	40	6	(Argentine Football Association) San Lorenzo
14	MF	Margarita Giménez	1 November 2004 (age 22)	11	0	(Royal Spanish Football Federation) FC Badalona
15	MF	Florencia Bonsegundo	14 July 1993 (age 33)	83	27	(Portuguese Football Federation) Sporting CP
17	MF	Agustina Vargas	27 December 2001 (age 24)	6	0	(Argentine Football Association) Newell's Old Boys
18	MF	Catalina Ongaro	26 March 2003 (age 23)	10	0	(Royal Spanish Football Federation) Dux Logroño
20	MF	Dalila Ippolito	24 March 2002 (age 24)	35	1	(Swiss Football Association) Grasshopper Club
9	FW	Kishi Núñez	17 May 2006 (age 20)	21	5	(Argentine Football Association) Boca Juniors
11	FW	Francisca Altgelt	11 May 2006 (age 20)	11	1	(Argentine Football Association) River Plate
19	FW	Agostina Holzheier	30 September 2003 (age 23)	27	3	(United States Soccer Federation) Bay FC
21	FW	Paulina Gramaglia	21 March 2003 (age 23)	30	2	(Royal Spanish Football Federation) UD Tenerife
22	FW	Mercedes Diz	24 February 2009 (age 17)	2	1	(Argentine Football Association) River Plate

=== Recent call-ups ===
The following players have also been called up to the squad within the past 12 months.

Pos.	Player	Date of birth (age)	Caps	Goals	Club	Latest call-up
GK	Renata Masciarelli	23 January 1997 (age 29)	1	0	(Spain) Fundación Albacete	2025 Copa América
DF	Camila Duarte	3 October 2005 (age 21)	0	0	(Argentina) River Plate	v. Colombia, 18 April 2026
DF	Milagros Vargas	6 July 2000 (age 26)	2	0	(Argentina) Belgrano	v. Bolivia, 3 December 2025
DF	Virginia Gómez	16 February 1991 (age 35)	12	0	(Argentina) San Lorenzo	v. Uruguay, 28 October 2025
DF	Carolina Ceniza	12 August 2007 (age 19)	0	0	(Argentina) River Plate	v. Uruguay, 28 October 2025
DF	Sofía Quiroga ^{PRE}	15 May 2008 (age 18)	0	0	(Argentina) River Plate	2025–26 CONMEBOL Liga de Naciones
DF	Serena Rodríguez ^{PRE}	26 December 2005 (age 20)	0	0	(Argentina) Racing	2025–26 CONMEBOL Liga de Naciones
MF	Juana Fonseca	16 May 2004 (age 22)	0	0	(Argentina) San Lorenzo	v. Uruguay, 28 October 2025
MF	Crisely Pavón	17 January 2001 (age 25)	2	0	(Argentina) Belgrano	v. Uruguay, 28 October 2025
MF	Dalma Mancilla	16 July 1997 (age 29)	0	0	(Argentina) Belgrano	v. Uruguay, 28 October 2025
MF	Julieta Romero ^{PRE}	8 June 2004 (age 22)	0	0	(Argentina) River Plate	2025–26 CONMEBOL Liga de Naciones
MF	Lola Ruffini ^{PRE}	8 August 2003 (age 23)	0	0	(Argentina) Boca Juniors	2025–26 CONMEBOL Liga de Naciones
MF	Luciana Zacmon ^{PRE}	18 March 2005 (age 21)	0	0	(Argentina) San Lorenzo	2025–26 CONMEBOL Liga de Naciones
MF	Betina Soriano	1 March 1994 (age 32)	7	0	(Argentina) Belgrano	2025 Copa América
FW	Annika Paz	16 November 2008 (age 18)	1	1	(Italy) Inter Milan	v. Colombia, 18 April 2026
FW	Martina Del Trecco	28 October 2001 (age 25)	2	0	(Brazil) Bragantino	v. Colombia, 18 April 2026
FW	Carolina Troncoso	28 January 1991 (age 35)	12	0	(Argentina) Boca Juniors	2026 She Believes
FW	Yamila Rodríguez	24 January 1998 (age 28)	64	14	(Brazil) Grêmio	v. Uruguay, 28 October 2025
Notes: ^{INJ} = Withdrew due to injury; ^{PRE} = Preliminary squad; ^{RET} = Retired from the national team; ^{WD} = Player withdrew from the squad due to non-injury issue

=== Captains ===
- Angélica Cardozo (1971) (Note: Cardozo and García captained Argentina at the unofficial 1971 Women's World Cup.)
- Betty García (1971)
- Gladys Liliana Rodríguez (1993)
- Marisa Gerez (2003–?)
- Eva González (2006–2010)
- Fabiana Vallejos (2014)
- Florencia Bonsegundo (2017–2018)
- Ruth Bravo (2018)
- Estefanía Banini (2018–2019)
- Vanina Correa (2019; 2021–2023)
- Vanesa Santana (2021)
- Miriam Mayorga (2024)
- Aldana Cometti (2024–)

== Records ==
As of 9 June 2026

Players in bold are still active with the national team.

=== Most appearances ===
Rank	Player	Career	Caps	Goals
1	**Aldana Cometti**	2014–present	108	11
2	**Eliana Stabile**	2017–present	86	6
3	**Florencia Bonsegundo**	2014–present	83	27
3	Mariana Larroquette	2014–2024	83	21
5	**Yamila Rodriguez**	2018–present	64	14
6	Agustina Barroso	2011–2022	63	1
7	**Daiana Falfán**	2019–present	62	1
8	**Sophia Braun**	2021–present	58	2
9	Vanesa Santana	2014–2023	57	0
10	Vanina Noemí Correa	2017–2024	56	0

- Stats only from 2010 to present.

=== Top goalscorers ===
Rank	Player	Career	Goals	Caps	Avg.
1	**Florencia Bonsegundo**	2014–present	27	83	0.32
2	Mariana Larroquette	2014–2024	21	83	0.25
3	**Yamila Rodriguez**	2018–present	14	64	0.22
4	Estefanía Banini	2010–2023	13	53	0.25
5	**Aldana Cometti**	2014–present	11	108	0.10
6	Soledad Jaimes	2010–2022	7	45	0.16
7	**Maricel Pereyra**	2021–present	6	40	0.15
7	**Eliana Stabile**	2017–present	6	86	0.07
9	**Kishi Núñez**	2024–present	5	21	0.24
10	Micaela Cabrera	2014–2019	4	18	0.22

- Stats only from 2010 to present.

== Competitive record ==
Champions Runners-up Third place Fourth place Tournament played on home soil

=== FIFA Women's World Cup ===
FIFA Women's World Cup record										Qualification record					
Year	Round	Position	Pld	W	D*	L	GF	GA	Squad	Pld	W	D	L	GF	GA
(China) 1991	Did not enter									Did not enter					
(Sweden) 1995	Did not qualify									Via Copa América Femenina					
(United States) 1999	Did not qualify									Via Copa América Femenina					
(United States) 2003	Group stage	16th	3	0	0	3	1	15	Squad	Via Copa América Femenina					
(China) 2007	Group stage	16th	3	0	0	3	1	18	Squad	Via Copa América Femenina					
(Germany) 2011	Did not qualify									Via Copa América Femenina					
(Canada) 2015	Did not qualify									Via Copa América Femenina					
(France) 2019	Group stage	18th	3	0	2	1	3	4	Squad	Via Copa América Femenina					
(Australia) (New Zealand) 2023	Group stage	27th	3	0	1	2	2	5	Squad	Via Copa América Femenina					
(Brazil) 2027	Qualified									To be determined					
(Costa Rica) (Jamaica) (Mexico) (United States) 2031	To be determined									To be determined					
(England) (Northern Ireland) (Scotland) (Wales) 2035	To be determined									To be determined					
Total	Group stage	5/10	12	0	3	9	7	42	—	54	31	6	17	128	71

FIFA Women's World Cup history
Year	Round	Date	Opponent	Result	Stadium
(United States) 2003	Group stage	20 September	Japan	L 0–6	Columbus Crew Stadium, Columbus
(United States) 2003	Group stage	24 September	Canada	L 0–3	Columbus Crew Stadium, Columbus
(United States) 2003	Group stage	27 September	Germany	L 1–6	RFK Stadium, Washington, D.C.
(China) 2007	Group stage	10 September	Germany	L 0–11	Hongkou Stadium, Shanghai
(China) 2007	Group stage	14 September	Japan	L 0–1	Hongkou Stadium, Shanghai
(China) 2007	Group stage	17 September	England	L 1–6	Chengdu Sports Center, Chengdu
(France) 2019	Group stage	9 June	Japan	D 0–0	Parc des Princes, Paris
(France) 2019	Group stage	14 June	England	L 0–1	Stade Océane, Le Havre
(France) 2019	Group stage	19 June	Scotland	D 3–3	Parc des Princes, Paris
(Australia) (New Zealand) 2023	Group stage	24 July	Italy	L 0–1	Eden Park, Auckland
(Australia) (New Zealand) 2023	Group stage	28 July	South Africa	D 2–2	Forsyth Barr Stadium, Dunedin
(Australia) (New Zealand) 2023	Group stage	2 August	Sweden	L 0–2	Waikato Stadium, Hamilton
(Brazil) 2027	Group stage				

=== CONMEBOL Copa América Femenina ===
CONMEBOL Copa América Femenina record
Year	Round	Position	Pld	W	D*	L	GF	GA	Squad
(Brazil) 1991	Did not enter								
(Brazil) 1995	Runners-up	2nd	5	3	0	2	18	11	Squad
(Argentina) 1998	Runners-up	2nd	6	4	1	1	18	9	Squad
(Peru) (Argentina) (Ecuador) 2003	Runners-up	2nd	5	3	1	1	17	6	Squad
(Argentina) 2006	Champions	1st	7	6	1	0	21	1	Squad
(Ecuador) 2010	Fourth place	4th	7	3	1	3	7	7	Squad
(Ecuador) 2014	Fourth place	4th	7	3	1	3	11	10	Squad
(Chile) 2018	Third place	3rd	7	4	0	3	15	14	Squad
(Colombia) 2022	Third place	3rd	6	4	0	2	13	6	Squad
(Ecuador) 2025	Third place	3rd	6	4	2	0	8	3	Squad
Total	1 Title	9/10	55	34	6	15	128	67	—

=== CONMEBOL Liga de Naciones Femenina ===
CONMEBOL Liga de Naciones Femenina record
Year	Result	Position	Pld	W	D	L	GF	GA
2025–26	To be determined	2nd	3	2	1	0	13	3
Total	—	1/1	3	2	1	0	13	3

=== CONCACAF W Gold Cup ===
CONCACAF W Gold Cup record
Year	Result	Position	Pld	W	D	L	GF	GA	Squad
(United States) 2024	Quarter-finals	7th	4	1	1	2	4	9	Squad
Total	Quarter-finals	1/1	4	1	1	2	4	9	

=== Women's Finalissima ===
Women's Finalissima record
Year	Result	Position	Pld	W	D	L	GF	GA
(England) 2023	Did not qualify							
Total	—	0/1	0	0	0	0	0	0

=== Olympic Games ===
Summer Olympics record
Year	Round	Position	Pld	W	D*	L	GF	GA	Squad
(United States) 1996	Did not qualify								
(Australia) 2000	Did not qualify								
(Greece) 2004	Did not qualify								
(China) 2008	Group stage	11th	3	0	0	3	1	5	Squad
(United Kingdom) 2012	Did not qualify								
(Brazil) 2016	Did not qualify								
(Japan) 2020	Did not qualify								
(France) 2024	Did not qualify								
(United States) 2028	To be determined								
Total	Group stage	1/9	3	0	0	3	1	5	—

=== Pan American Games ===
Pan American Games record
Year	Round	Position	Pld	W	D*	L	GF	GA	Squad
(Canada) 1999	Did not qualify								
(Dominican Republic) 2003	Fourth place	4th	4	1	0	3	7	11	Squad
(Brazil) 2007	Group stage	5th	4	3	0	1	8	5	Squad
(Mexico) 2011	Group stage	7th	3	0	1	2	3	6	Squad
(Canada) 2015	Group stage	8th	3	0	1	2	3	7	Squad
(Peru) 2019	Runners-up	2nd	5	3	2	0	8	1	Squad
(Chile) 2023	Fourth place	4th	5	1	1	3	3	8	Squad
(Peru) 2027	Qualified								
Total	1 Silver Medal	7/8	24	8	5	11	32	38	—

=== South American Games ===
South American Games record
Year	Round	Position	Pld	W	D*	L	GF	GA
(Chile) 2014	Gold Medal	1st	4	2	1	1	6	2
(Bolivia) 2018 to present	U-20 Tournament							
Total	Gold Medal	1/1	4	2	1	1	6	2

=== Minor tournaments ===
Minor tournaments record
Year	Result	Position	Pld	W	D	L	GF	GA
(Brazil) 1995 Torneio Internacional Cidade de Uberlândia	Third place	3rd	4	1	0	3	5	14
2000 Copa Guatemala "Cerveza Gallo"	Winners	1st	3	3	0	0	20	0
2000 Copa Argentina de Fútbol Femenino	Winners	1st	3	3	0	0	10	1
(Peru) 2001 Tri-Nations Tournament	Runners-up	2nd	2	1	0	1	7	3
(Costa Rica) 2003 Tri-Nations Tournament	Third place	3rd	2	0	0	2	3	5
(Argentina) 2005 Tri-Nations Tournament	Runners-up	2nd	2	1	1	0	4	2
(United States) 2007 AYSA International Soccer Festival	Third place	3rd	3	1	2	0	4	2
(South Korea) 2008 Peace Queen Cup	Group stage	8th	3	0	0	3	0	8
2010 Copa Bicentenario Chile	Fifth place	5th	4	0	2	2	0	4
(Brazil) 2014 Torneio Internacional de Brasília de Futebol Feminino	Fourth place	4th	4	0	1	3	0	17
(Australia) 2019 Cup of Nations	Fourth place	4th	3	0	0	3	0	10
(Brazil) 2019 Torneio Uber Internacional de Futebol Feminino	Fourth place	4th	2	0	0	2	1	8
(United States) 2021 SheBelieves Cup	Fourth place	4th	3	0	0	3	1	11
(Spain) 2022 Ultimate Cup	Third place	3rd	2	0	1	1	2	4
(United States) 2026 SheBelieves Cup	Fourth place	4th	3	0	1	2	0	3
Total	2 Titles	15/15	43	10	8	25	57	92

== Head-to-head record ==
Below is a result summary of all matches Argentina has played against FIFA recognised teams.

As of 7 March 2026 after the match against Canada.

Positive record Neutral record Negative record

Against	Played	Won	Drawn	Lost	GF	GA	GD
Australia	4	0	0	4	1	16	−15
Bolivia	8	8	0	0	48	0	48
Brazil	21	2	1	18	14	73	−59
Canada	9	1	1	7	2	17	−15
Chile	22	11	5	6	41	23	18
China	5	1	1	3	1	9	−8
Colombia	16	4	8	4	19	14	5
Costa Rica	9	4	3	2	16	12	0
Denmark	1	0	0	1	0	1	−1
Ecuador	10	6	2	2	27	10	17
El Salvador	1	1	0	0	6	0	6
England	2	0	0	2	1	7	−6
Germany	2	0	0	2	1	17	−16
Guatemala	1	1	0	0	5	0	5
Italy	1	0	0	1	0	1	−1
Japan	6	0	1	5	0	20	−20
Mexico	11	1	2	8	12	29	−17
New Zealand	8	3	1	4	6	8	−2
Nicaragua	1	1	0	0	9	0	9
Panama	4	3	1	0	8	1	7
Paraguay	11	10	1	0	30	6	24
Peru	12	9	2	1	27	8	19
Poland	1	0	1	0	2	2	0
Puerto Rico	2	1	1	0	4	1	3
Scotland	1	0	1	0	3	3	0
South Africa	1	0	1	0	2	2	0
South Korea	3	0	0	3	1	9	−8
Spain	1	0	0	1	0	7	−7
Sweden	2	0	0	2	0	3	−3
Trinidad and Tobago	2	1	1	0	4	2	2
United States*	10	0	0	10	1	46	−45
Uruguay	22	17	3	2	63	14	49
Venezuela	6	4	2	0	8	1	7
Total	217	90	39	88	365	364	1

- including matches against USA U-19 at the 2023 Pan American Games.

=== By confederation ===
Against	Played	Won	Drawn	Lost	GF	GA	GD
AFC	17	1	2	14	3	47	-44
CAF	1	0	1	0	2	2	0
CONCACAF	51	15	9	27	70	108	-38
CONMEBOL	128	71	24	33	277	149	128
OFC*	9	3	1	5	6	17	-11
UEFA	11	0	2	9	7	41	-34

- includes 1 match against Australia prior to them joining the AFC in 2006.

== FIFA World Ranking ==
As of 10 March 2026.

Best Ranking Worst Ranking Best Mover Worst Mover

Argentina's FIFA World Ranking History
Year	Rank at year end	Best		Worst	
Year	Rank at year end	Rank	Move	Rank	Move
2026	TBD				
2025	30	30	▲2	33	Steady
2024	33	33	Steady	33	▼2
2023	31	28	▲1	31	▼3
2022	29	29	▲4	35	▼1
2021	34	34	▲1	35	▼4
2020	31	31	▲2	32	▲1
2019	34	34	▲3	37	▼1
2018	36	35	▲2	37	▼2
2017	36	36	▼36	36	▼36
2016	34	34	▼1	34	▼1
2015	35	35	▲1	36	Steady
2014	36	35	▲1	37	▼35
2013	36	36	Steady	36	Steady
2012	36	33	▲1	36	▼3
2011	35	33	Steady	35	▼5
2010	28	28	▲1	29	▼1
2009	27	27	▲1	28	Steady
2008	28	27	▲2	29	▼1
2007	29	28	▲3	32	▼1
2006	31	31	▲1	37	▼5
2005	36	36	▲1	37	Steady
2004	37	37	▲1	38	Steady
2003	38	35	▲3	38	▼3

== Honours ==
=== Major competitions ===
- Copa América Femenina
  - (gold) Champions (1): 2006
  - (silver) Runners-up (3): 1995, 1998, 2003
  - (bronze) Third place (3): 2018, 2022, 2025

=== Others competitions ===
Intercontinental

- Pan American Games
  - (silver) Silver Medalists (1): 2019

Continental

- South American Games
  - (gold) Gold Medalists (1): 2014

== See also ==
- Sport in Argentina
- Football in Argentina
- Women's football in Argentina
  - Argentina women's national under-20 football team
    - Argentina women's national under-17 football team
      - Argentina–Brazil football rivalry

== Notes and references ==
=== References ===
Sporting positions
Preceded by 2003 Brazil	South American Champions; 2006 (First title)	Succeeded by 2010 Brazil
