= Football at the 2019 Pan American Games – Women's tournament =

Football – Women's tournament at the 2019 Pan American Games
- Dates: 28 July – 9 August 2019

Medalists
Gold medal	Colombia
Silver medal	Argentina
Bronze medal	Costa Rica

The Women's football tournament at the 2019 Pan American Games was held in Lima during July and August 2019.

== Qualification ==
A total of eight women's teams qualified to compete at the games, four CONMEBOL teams and four CONCACAF teams. For CONMEBOL, the three teams ranked third to fifth at the 2018 Copa América Femenina qualified, while Peru automatically qualified as hosts. For CONCACAF, the best team from each of the three zones (North American, Central American and Caribbean) at the 2018 CONCACAF Women's Championship qualified; however, both United States and Canada declined to participate to focus on the 2019 FIFA Women's World Cup, so Mexico qualified for the North American berth, while Costa Rica also qualified by decision of CONCACAF.

=== Qualified teams ===
Confederation	Region	Means of qualification	Teams qualified	Appearance	Previous best performance
CONCACAF	North American	2018 CONCACAF Women's Championship (4–17 October 2018)	Mexico	6th	Silver medal (1999)
CONCACAF	Caribbean	2018 CONCACAF Women's Championship (4–17 October 2018)	Jamaica	2nd	Group stage (2007)
CONCACAF	Central American	2018 CONCACAF Women's Championship (4–17 October 2018)	Panama	2nd	Group stage (2007)
CONCACAF	Central American	Last berth defined by CONCACAF	Costa Rica	5th	Bronze medal (1999)
CONMEBOL	South American	Automatically qualified	Peru (hosts)	1st	Debut
CONMEBOL	South American	2018 Copa América Femenina (4–22 April 2018)	Argentina	5th	Fourth place (2003)
CONMEBOL	South American	2018 Copa América Femenina (4–22 April 2018)	Colombia	3rd	Silver medal (2015)
CONMEBOL	South American	2018 Copa América Femenina (4–22 April 2018)	Paraguay	2nd	Group stage (2007)

== Draw ==
The draw of the tournament was held on 12 April 2019, 12:00 PET (UTC−5), at the Peruvian Football Federation headquarters in Lima, Peru. The eight teams were drawn into two groups of four and each group had two CONCACAF teams and two CONMEBOL teams. The hosts Peru were seeded into group B and assigned to position 4 in their group, while the remaining seven teams were placed into two pots according to the confederation to which they belong.

CONCACAF pot	CONMEBOL pot
Costa Rica; Jamaica; Mexico; Panama	Argentina; Colombia; Paraguay

The CONCACAF teams were drawn first and assigned to positions 1 and 2 in groups A and B. Then, the CONMEBOL teams were drawn and the first two teams occupied positions 3 and 4 in group A while the third team occupied the position 3 in group B. The draw resulted in the following groups:

Group A
Pos	Team
A1	Mexico
A2	Jamaica
A3	Paraguay
A4	Colombia

Group B
Pos	Team
B1	Panama
B2	Costa Rica
B3	Argentina
B4	Peru

The draw was led by Hugo Figueredo, competition director of CONMEBOL, and had the help of Miriam Tristan and Cindy Novoa, members of the Peru women's national football team.

== Squads ==
There are no age restrictions for the women's event.

== Group stage ==
Tie-breakers

All times are local, PET (UTC−5).

=== Group A ===
Pos	Team	Pld	W	D	L	GF	GA	GD	Pts	Qualification
1	Paraguay	3	2	1	0	5	2	+3	7	Knockout stage
2	Colombia	3	1	2	0	4	2	+2	5	Knockout stage
3	Mexico	3	1	1	1	5	4	+1	4	Fifth place match
4	Jamaica	3	0	0	3	1	7	−6	0	Seventh place match

Source: Lima 2019
Rules for classification: Tie-breakers
28 July 2019
10:00

Mexico	2–0	Jamaica
Palacios 39'; Corral 58'	Report

Estadio Universidad San Marcos
Referee: Elizabeth Tintaya (Peru)
28 July 2019
13:00

Paraguay	0–0	Colombia
	Report

Estadio Universidad San Marcos
Referee: Deborah Cruz (Brazil)

31 July 2019
10:00

Mexico	1–2	Paraguay
Mayor 36'	Report	Cristaldo 9'; Sandoval 45'

Estadio Universidad San Marcos
Referee: Silvia Ríos (Uruguay)
31 July 2019
13:00

Jamaica	0–2	Colombia
	Report	Santos 58', 85'

Estadio Universidad San Marcos
Referee: Milagros Arruela (Peru)

3 August 2019
10:00

Mexico	2–2	Colombia
Caracas 59' (o.g.); Corral 87'	Report	Echeverri 26'; Vanegas 36'

Estadio Universidad San Marcos
Referee: Susana Corella (Ecuador)
3 August 2019
13:00

Paraguay	3–1	Jamaica
J. Martínez 4', 63'; Quintana 90'+1'	Report	Hudson-Marks 31'

Estadio Universidad San Marcos
Referee: Elizabeth Tintaya (Peru)

=== Group B ===
Pos	Team	Pld	W	D	L	GF	GA	GD	Pts	Qualification
1	Costa Rica	3	2	1	0	6	2	+4	7	Knockout stage
2	Argentina	3	2	1	0	4	0	+4	7	Knockout stage
3	Panama	3	0	1	2	2	5	−3	1	Fifth place match
4	Peru (H)	3	0	1	2	2	7	−5	1	Seventh place match

Source: Lima 2019
Rules for classification: Tie-breakers
(H) Hosts
28 July 2019
17:30

Panama	1–3	Costa Rica
Mills 14'	Report	Chinchilla 73', 85'; Blanco 79'

Estadio Universidad San Marcos
Referee: Susana Corella (Ecuador)
28 July 2019
20:30

Argentina	3–0	Peru
Larroquette 6', 88'; Oviedo 9'	Report

Estadio Universidad San Marcos
Referee: Dione Rissios (Chile)

31 July 2019
17:30

Panama	0–1	Argentina
	Report	Larroquette 66'

Estadio Universidad San Marcos
Referee: Yercinia Correa (Venezuela)
31 July 2019
20:30

Costa Rica	3–1	Peru
R. Rodríguez 55', 90+3'; C. Sánchez 84'	Report	Otiniano 14'

Estadio Universidad San Marcos
Referee: Adriana Farfán (Bolivia)

3 August 2019
17:30

Costa Rica	0–0	Argentina
	Report

Estadio Universidad San Marcos
Referee: Silvia Ríos (Uruguay)
3 August 2019
20:30

Panama	1–1	Peru
Cox 39' (pen.)	Report	Otiniano 41'

Estadio Universidad San Marcos
Referee: Yercinia Correa (Venezuela)

== Placement stage (5th–8th place) ==
7th place
6 August
Jamaica	1
Peru	0

5th place
6 August
Mexico	5
Panama	1

=== Seventh place match ===
6 August 2019
10:00

Jamaica	1–0	Peru
Grey 26'	Report

Estadio Universidad San Marcos
Referee: Adriana Farfán (Bolivia)

=== Fifth place match ===
6 August 2019
13:00

Mexico	5–1	Panama
Ovalle 1', 90+3'; Rodriguez 13'; Mayor 21'; Martínez 70'	Report	Riley 90+1' (pen.)

Estadio Universidad San Marcos
Referee: Milagros Arruela (Peru)

== Knockout stage ==
If necessary, extra time and penalty shoot-out would be used to decide the winner.

Semi-finals
6 August
Paraguay	0
Argentina	3
6 August
Costa Rica	3
Colombia (a.e.t.)	4

Gold medal match
9 August
Argentina	1 (6)
Colombia (p)	1 (7)
Bronze medal match
9 August
Paraguay	0
Costa Rica	1

=== Semi-finals ===
6 August 2019
17:30

Paraguay	0–3	Argentina
	Report	Larroquette 13' (pen.); Cometti 20'; Oviedo 34'

Estadio Universidad San Marcos
Referee: Dione Rissios (Chile)
6 August 2019
20:30

Costa Rica	3–4 (a.e.t.)	Colombia
C. Sánchez 59', 87'; Salas 89'	Report	Santos 30'; Gaitán 33'; Ospina 68'; Usme 93'

Estadio Universidad San Marcos
Referee: Deborah Cruz (Brazil)

=== Bronze medal match ===
9 August 2019
17:30

Paraguay	0–1	Costa Rica
	Report	D. Cruz 82'

Estadio Universidad San Marcos
Referee: Silvia Ríos (Uruguay)

=== Gold medal match ===
9 August 2019
20:30

Argentina	1–1 (a.e.t.)	Colombia
Barroso 41'	Report 1 Report 2	Usme 33'
Penalties
Larroquette (penalty scored); Stábile (penalty scored); Santana (penalty scored); Cometti (penalty scored); Oviedo (penalty scored); Barroso (penalty scored); Chávez (penalty missed)	6–7	(penalty scored) Usme; (penalty scored) Restrepo; (penalty scored) Gaitán; (penalty scored) Echeverri; (penalty scored) Santos; (penalty scored) Vanegas; (penalty scored) C. Arias

Estadio Universidad San Marcos
Referee: Susana Corella (Ecuador)

Team details

Argentina
Colombia

GK	1	Vanina Correa
DF	18	Gabriela Chávez
DF	2	Agustina Barroso
DF	6	Aldana Cometti
DF	3	Eliana Stábile	(yellow card) 44'
MF	16	Natalie Juncos		(substituted off) 53'
MF	5	Vanesa Santana
MF	14	Miriam Mayorga
FW	11	Mariana Larroquette
FW	15	Yamila Rodríguez		(substituted off) 66'
FW	7	Yael Oviedo	(yellow card) 111'
Substitutes:
FW	9	Milagros Menéndez		(substituted in) 53'	(yellow card) 61' (yellow-red card) 106'
MF	10	Dalila Ippólito		(substituted in) 66'
Manager:
(Argentina) Carlos Borrello

GK	1	Catalina Pérez
DF	2	Manuela Vanegas
DF	5	Isabella Echeverri
DF	15	Daniela Caracas
DF	17	Carolina Arias
MF	3	Natalia Gaitán
MF	6	Daniela Montoya	(yellow card) 40'	(substituted off) 90'
MF	10	Leicy Santos
MF	8	Jessica Caro
FW	9	Oriánica Velásquez		(substituted off) 54'
FW	11	Catalina Usme
Substitutes:
FW	18	Mayra Ramírez		(substituted in) 54' (yellow card) 65'
MF	7	Marcela Restrepo		(substituted in) 90'
Manager:
(Colombia) Nelson Abadía

2019 Pan American Games winners

Colombia
First title

== Final standings ==
Rank	Team
1st place, gold medalist(s)	Colombia
2nd place, silver medalist(s)	Argentina
3rd place, bronze medalist(s)	Costa Rica
4	Paraguay
5	Mexico
6	Panama
7	Jamaica
8	Peru

== Goalscorers ==
There were 49 goals scored in 18 matches, for an average of 2.72 goals per match.

4 goals

- (Argentina) Mariana Larroquette

3 goals

- (Colombia) Leicy Santos
- (Costa Rica) Carol Sánchez

2 goals

- (Argentina) Yael Oviedo
- (Colombia) Catalina Usme
- (Costa Rica) Priscila Chinchilla
- (Costa Rica) Raquel Rodríguez
- (Mexico) Charlyn Corral
- (Mexico) Stephany Mayor
- (Mexico) Lizbeth Ovalle
- (Paraguay) Jessica Martínez
- (Peru) Steffani Otiniano

1 goal

- (Argentina) Agustina Barroso
- (Argentina) Aldana Cometti
- (Colombia) Isabella Echeverri
- (Colombia) Natalia Gaitán
- (Colombia) Diana Ospina
- (Colombia) Manuela Vanegas
- (Costa Rica) Stephannie Blanco
- (Costa Rica) Daniela Cruz
- (Costa Rica) María Paula Salas
- (Jamaica) Mireya Grey
- (Jamaica) Chanel Hudson-Marks
- (Mexico) Katty Martínez
- (Mexico) Kiana Palacios
- (Mexico) Kimberly Rodríguez
- (Panama) Marta Cox
- (Panama) Natalia Mills
- (Panama) Karla Riley
- (Paraguay) Laurie Cristaldo
- (Paraguay) Dulce Quintana
- (Paraguay) Fabiola Sandoval

1 own goal

- (Colombia) Daniela Caracas (against Mexico)
