= Yael Oviedo =

Argentine footballer

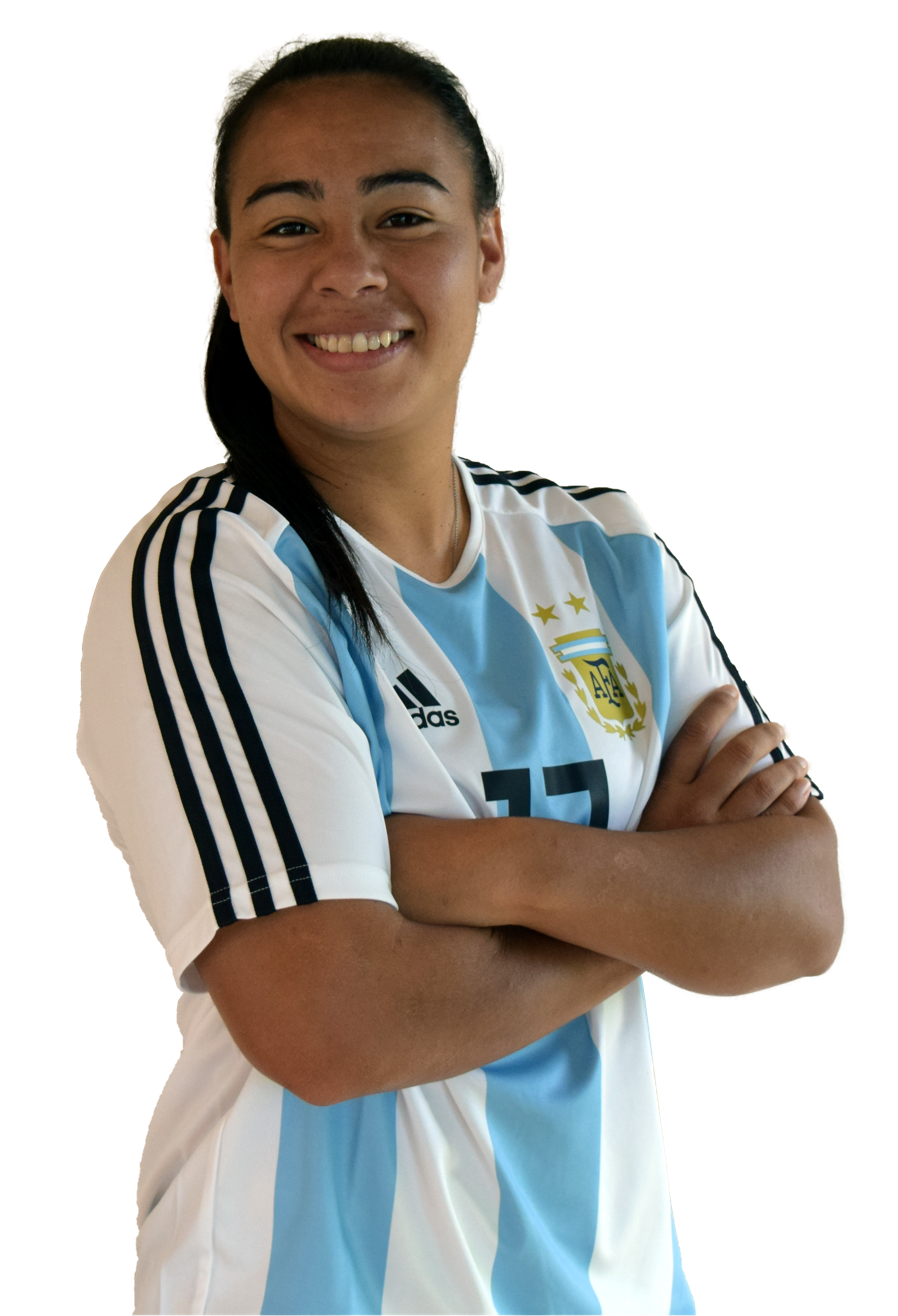
- Oviedo with Argentina in 2018

Personal information
- Full name: Yael Damaris Oviedo
- Date of birth: 22 May 1992 (age 34)
- Place of birth: Concordia, Entre Ríos, Argentina
- Height: 1.64 m (5 ft 5 in)
- Position: Forward

Team information
- Current team: Cobresal

Senior career*
Years	Team	Apps	(Gls)
2011–2015	Boca Juniors		
2014	→ Foz Cataratas (loan)		
2016	UAI Urquiza		
2016–2019	Granada		
2019–2020	Rayo Vallecano	31	(2)
2020–2021	Universidad de Chile	1+	(3+)
2025–	Cobresal		

International career^{‡}
2012	Argentina U-20	4+	(2)
2010–2021	Argentina	22	(2)
Medal record
Women's football
Representing Argentina
Pan American Games
Silver medal – second place	2019 Lima	Team
South American Games
Gold medal – first place	2014 Santiago	Team
- * Club domestic league appearances and goals as of 5 May 2020 ‡ National team caps and goals as of 5 May 2020

Yael Damaris Oviedo (born 22 May 1992) is an Argentine footballer who plays as a forward for Chilean club Cobresal. She represented the Argentina women's national team.

== Club career ==
Oviedo announced her retirement on 18 February 2022. She returned to the activity with Chilean club Cobresal in April 2025.

== International career ==
Oviedo represented Argentina at the 2012 FIFA U-20 Women's World Cup.

=== International goals ===
Scores and results list Argentina's goal tally first

No.	Date	Venue	Opponent	Score	Result	Competition
1	16 March 2014	Estadio Bicentenario de La Florida, Santiago, Chile	Chile	2–1	2–1	2014 South American Games
2	28 July 2019	Estadio Universidad San Marcos, Lima, Peru	Peru	2–0	3–0	2019 Pan American Games

== Honors and awards ==
=== Clubs ===
- Boca Juniors
  - Torneo Apertura: 2011, 2012
  - Torneo Clausura: 2013
  - Torneo Inicial: 2013–14
- UAI Urquiza
  - Torneo Femenino: 2016
- Universidad de Chile
  - Femenino Caja Los Andes: 2021

=== National team ===
- Argentina
  - South American Games: 2014

== Activism ==
Oviedo supports abortion being legal, safe and free in Argentina.

== Retirement ==
Oviedo announced her retirement from professional football on 18 Feb, 2022 through her social media.
