= Agustina Barroso =

Argentine footballer (born 1993)

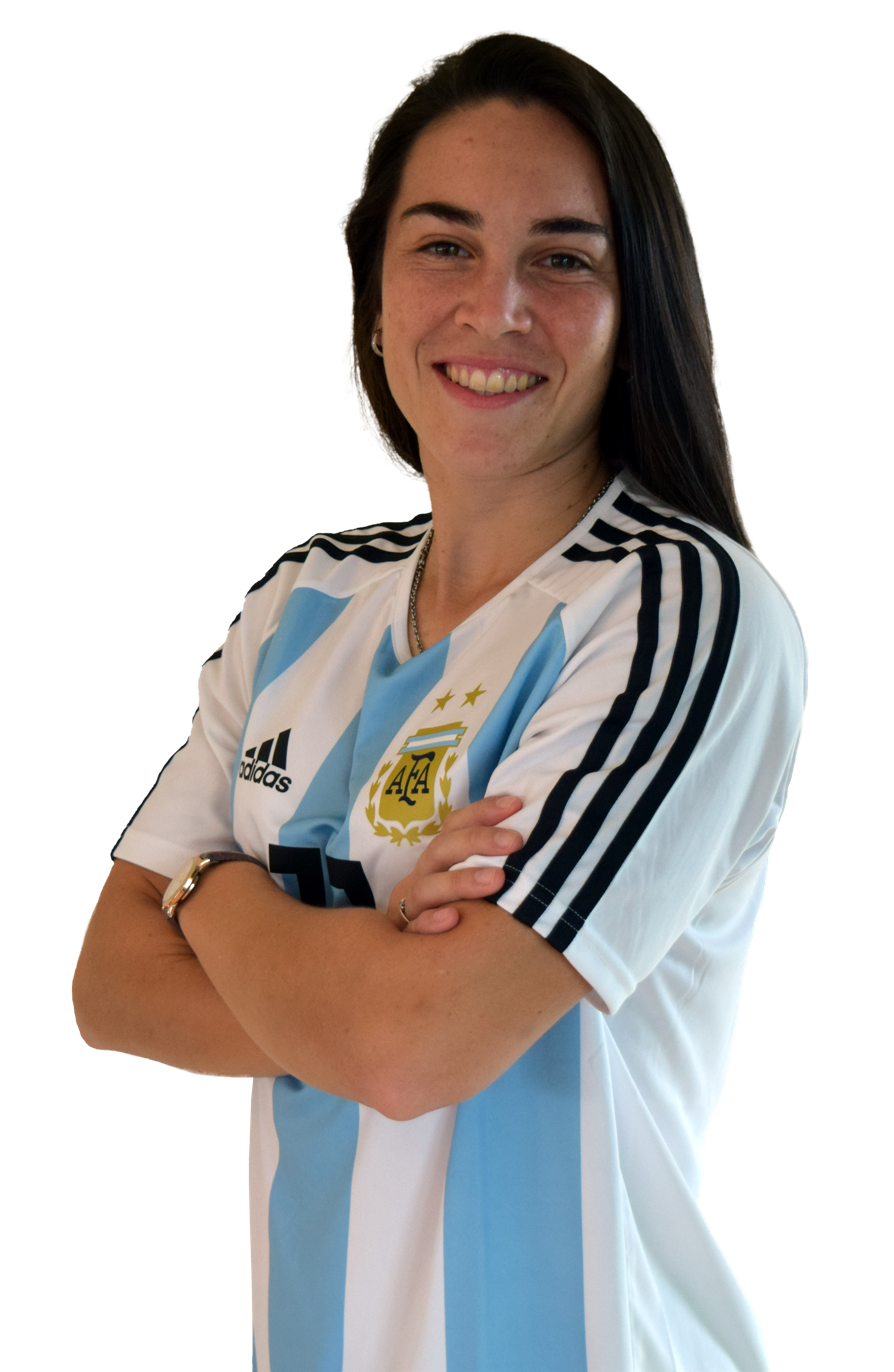

Personal information
- Full name: Agustina Barroso Basualdo
- Date of birth: 20 May 1993 (age 33)
- Place of birth: Tandil, Argentina
- Height: 1.64 m (5 ft 5 in)
- Position: Centre back

Team information
- Current team: Corinthians
- Number: 2

Senior career*
Years	Team	Apps	(Gls)
2011–2015	UAI Urquiza		
2016	Ferroviária	4	(0)
2016–2017	Fylde Ladies		
2017	Osasco Audax	15	(1)
2017	Corinthians	0	(0)
2018	Osasco Audax	7	(2)
2018–2019	Madrid CFF	15	(0)
2019	UAI Urquiza	4	(0)
2020–2022	Palmeiras	69	(6)
2023	Flamengo	21	(0)
2023–2024	UD Tenerife	24	(2)
2024–2025	Flamengo		
2026–	Corinthians		

International career^{‡}
2012	Argentina U-20	2	(0)
2011–	Argentina	46	(1)
Medal record
Women's football
Representing Argentina
South American Games
Gold medal – first place	2014 Santiago	Team
Copa América Femenina
Third place	2018 Chile
Third place	2022 Colombia
Pan American Games
Silver medal – second place	2019 Lima	Team
- * Club domestic league appearances and goals as of 5 December 2023 ‡ National team caps and goals as of 20 July 2023

Agustina "Agus" Barroso Basualdo (born 20 May 1993) is an Argentine professional footballer who plays as a centre back for Corinthians and the Argentina women's national team.

== Club career ==
Barroso previously played for Fylde Ladies of the English FA Women's Premier League Northern Division.

== International career ==
Barroso represented Argentina at the 2012 FIFA U-20 Women's World Cup. At senior level, she played two Pan American Games editions (2011 and 2015) (Note: 2015 Pan American Games matches are not recognised by FIFA.) and two Copa América Femenina editions (2014 and 2018).

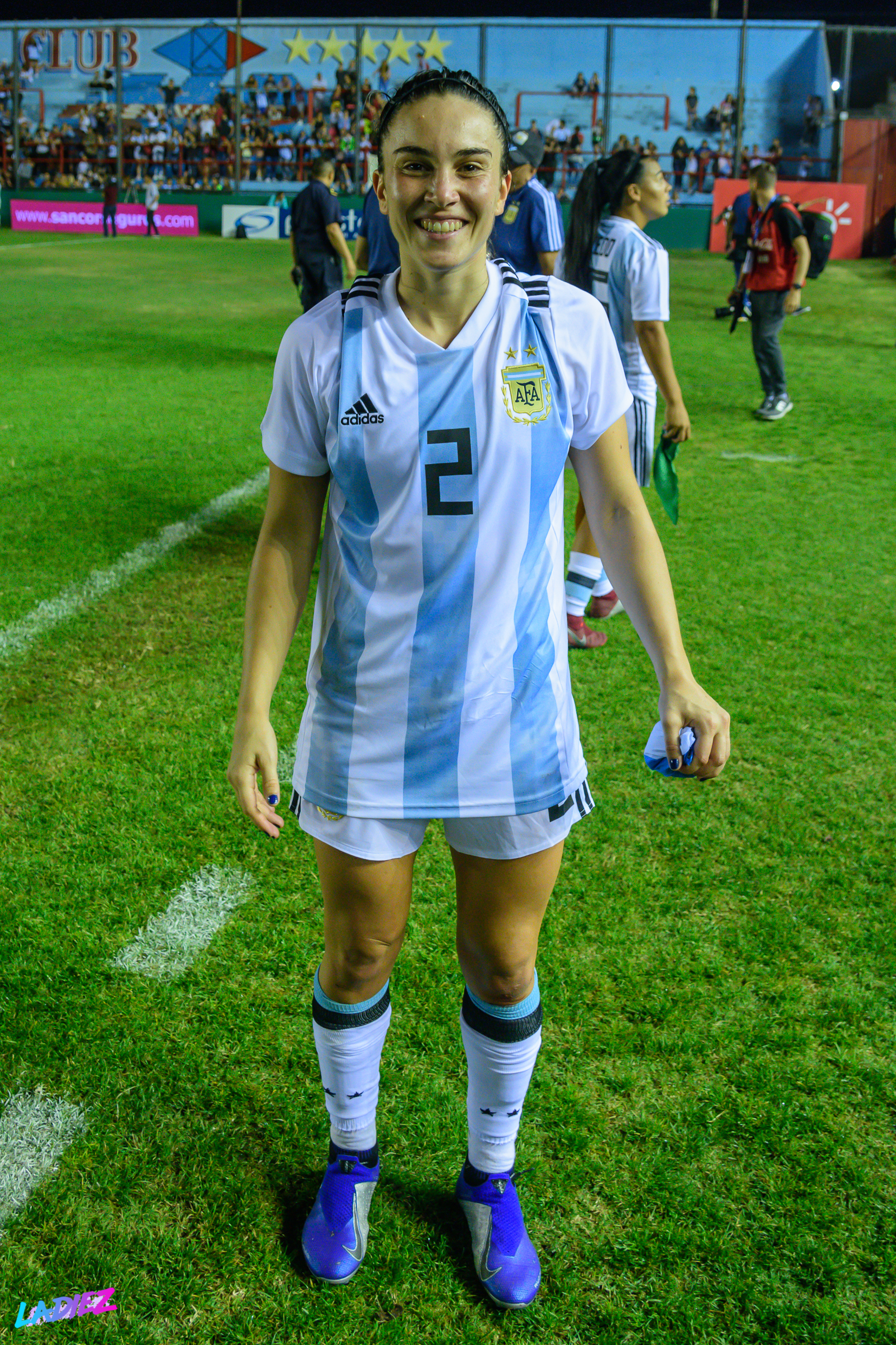
Barroso playing for Argentina in November 2018

== Honours ==
UAI Urquiza

- Torneo Clausura: 2012
- Torneo Final: 2014

Corinthians

- Copa Libertadores Femenina: 2017

Argentina

- South American Games: 2014
