= Isabella Echeverri =

Colombian footballer (born 1994)

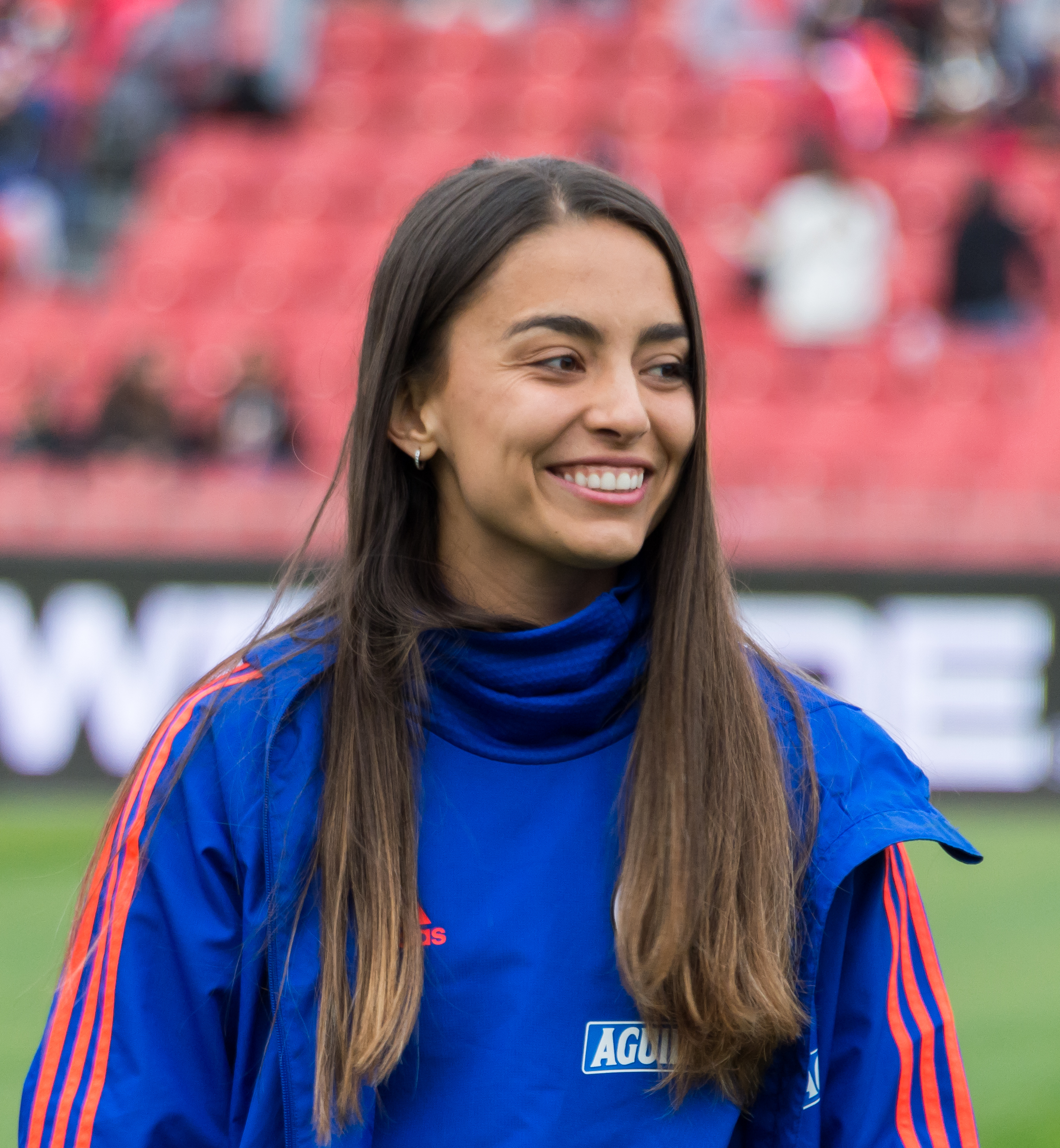

Personal information
- Full name: Isabella Echeverri Restrepo
- Date of birth: 16 June 1994 (age 32)
- Place of birth: Medellín, Colombia
- Height: 1.75 m (5 ft 9 in)
- Positions: Centre back; defensive midfielder

College career
Years	Team	Apps	(Gls)
2013–2017	Toledo Rockets		

Senior career*
Years	Team	Apps	(Gls)
- CD Palmiranas
2016–2018	Houston Aces		
2018–2019	Elpides Karditsas		
2019	Houston Aces		
2019–2022	Sevilla	54	(3)
2022	Monterrey	8	(0)

International career^{‡}
2014–2023	Colombia	15	(1)
Medal record
Women's football
Representing Colombia
Pan American Games
Gold medal – first place	2019 Lima	Team
- * Club domestic league appearances and goals ‡ National team caps and goals as of 12:10, 27 Jule 2018 (UTC)

Isabella "Isa" Echeverri Restrepo (born 16 June 1994) is a Colombian former professional footballer who last played as a centre back for Liga MX Femenil club CF Monterrey and the Colombia women's national team.

Born in Medellín, Echeverri played club football for Sevilla FC and CF Monterrey. She was part of the Colombia national team that participated at the 2015 FIFA Women's World Cup and 2016 Summer Olympics as well as winning the 2019 Pan American Games. After becoming a vocal critic of the Colombia national team leadership over workplace conditions, Echeverri retired from playing football at age 28.

== Career ==
On 17 July 2019, Echeverri was announced at Sevilla on a permanent transfer. On 16 July 2021, she signed a new one-year contract with the club. On 25 May 2022, the club announced she would be leaving after making 59 total appearances for the club.

On 10 July 2022, Echeverri made her debut for Monterrey against San Luis.

In February 2023, Echeverri announced her retirement from football.

== International career ==
On 8 September 2014, Echeverri was called up to the Colombia squad for the 2014 Copa América Femenina.

On 20 May 2015, Echeverri was called up to the Colombia squad for the 2015 FIFA Women's World Cup.

On 14 July 2016, Echeverri was called up to the Colombia squad for the 2016 Summer Olympics.

In 2018, Echeverri was called up to the Colombia squad for the 2018 Copa América Femenina.

== Activism ==
In 2019, Echeverri and fellow Colombia teammate Melissa Ortiz spoke about alleged discrimination they faced from the Colombian Football Federation, involving being forced to pay for their own flights, made to wear old jerseys, and refusing to pay the players.

Echeverri was named a Save the Dream ambassador in December 2022.

Following her retirement, Echeverri became a Union & Player Relations Coordinator for FIFPRO.
