= Vanesa Santana =

Argentine footballer

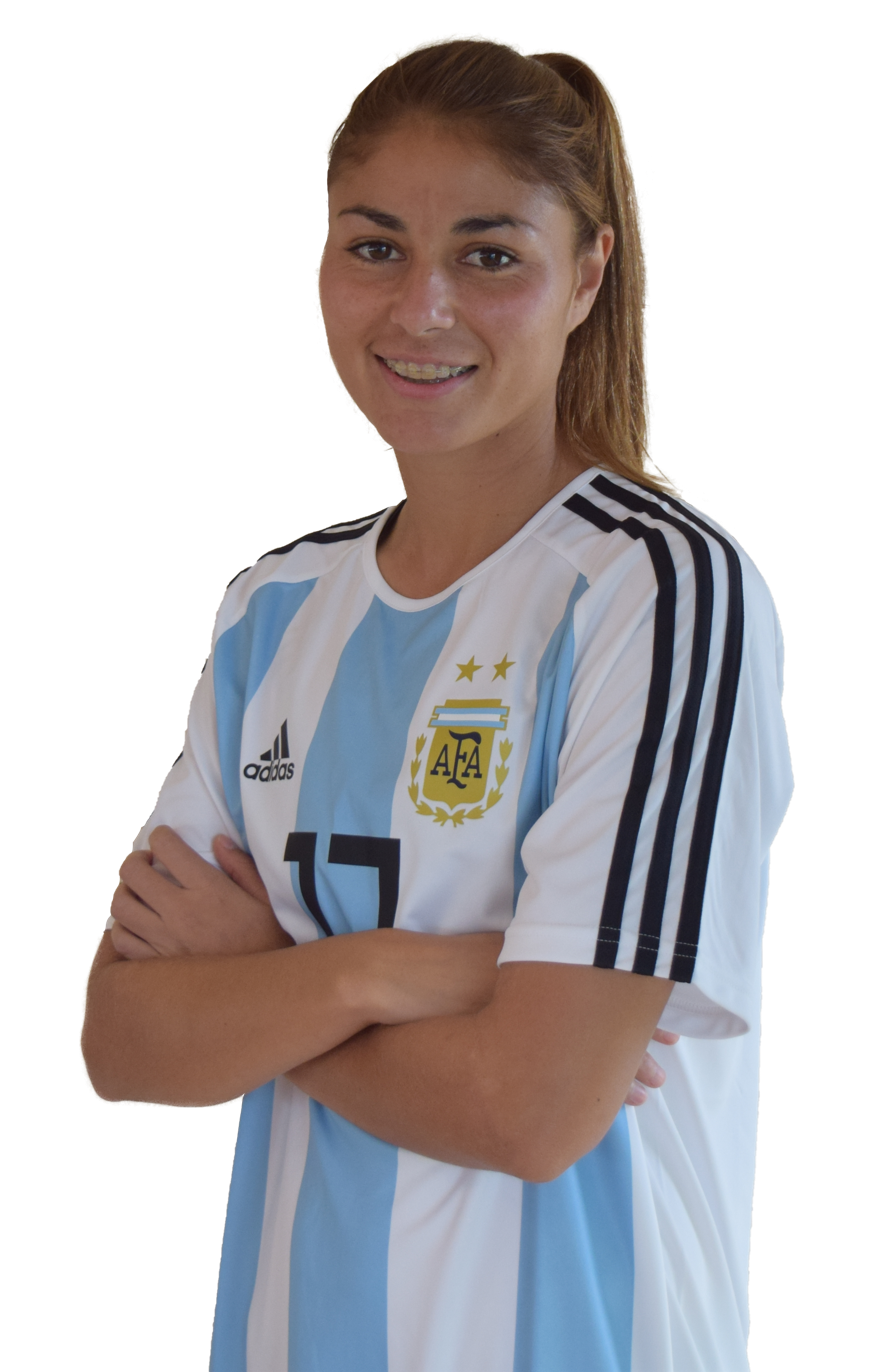

Personal information
- Date of birth: 3 September 1990 (age 36)
- Place of birth: Villa Celina, Buenos Aires, Argentina
- Height: 1.66 m (5 ft 5 in)
- Position: Midfielder

Team information
- Current team: Racing FC Union
- Number: 15

Youth career
- 1995–2003: José Hernández

Senior career*
| Years | Team | Apps | (Gls) |
| 2003–2005 | José Hernández | | |
| 2005–2016 | Boca Juniors | | |
| 2016 | → Estudiantes de Guárico (loan) | | |
| 2017 | Atlético Huila | | |
| 2018 | América de Cali | | |
| 2018–2020 | Logroño | 48 | (4) |
| 2020–2023 | Sporting de Huelva | 71 | (1) |
| 2023–2024 | Alavés | 8 | (0) |
| 2024 | Trabzonspor | 1 | (0) |
| 2025 | Sporting de Huelva | 11 | (0) |
| 2025 | Social Atlético Televisión | | |
| 2026 | CD Argual | | |
| 2026– | Racing FC Union | | |

International career^{‡}
| 2008–2010 | Argentina U-20 | | |
| 2011– | Argentina | 16 | (0) |
Medal record
Women's football
Representing Argentina
Copa América Femenina
| Third place | 2018 Chile |
| Third place | 2022 Colombia |
Pan American Games
| Silver medal – second place | 2019 Lima | Team |
- * Club domestic league appearances and goals as of 29 November 2023 ‡ National team caps and goals as of 6 March 2019

Vanesa Santana (born 3 September 1990) is an Argentine professional footballer who plays as a midfielder for Racing FC Union the Argentina women's national team. She has also played for the Argentina U-20 team.

== International career ==
Santana represented Argentina at the 2008 South American U-20 Women's Championship, 2008 FIFA U-20 Women's World Cup and the 2010 South American U-20 Women's Championship. She made her senior debut in 2011.

== Honours ==
Boca Juniors

- Primera División A: 2005 Clausura, 2005 Apertura, 2006 Clausura, 2006 Apertura, 2007 Clausura, 2007 Apertura, 2008 Clausura, 2009 Apertura, 2010 Apertura, 2011 Clausura, 2011 Apertura, 2012 Apertura, 2013 Clausura, 2013 Inicial
- Supercopa Argentina de Fútbol Femenino: 2015

Argentina

- Pan American Games Runner-up: 2019
- Copa América Third place: 2018, 2022
