= 2019 FIFA Women's World Cup squads =

List of squads of the 2019 FIFA Women's World Cup

The 2019 FIFA Women's World Cup was an international women's association football tournament held in France from 7 June until 7 July 2019. The 24 national teams involved in the tournament were required to register a squad of 23 players, including three goalkeepers. Only players in these squads were eligible to take part in the tournament.

A provisional list of between 23 and 50 players per national team was submitted to FIFA by 26 April 2019, which was not published. From the preliminary squad, the final list of 23 players per national team was submitted to FIFA by 24 May 2019, two weeks prior to the opening match of the tournament. FIFA published the final lists with squad numbers on their website on 27 May 2019. Teams were permitted to make late replacements in the event of serious injury, at any time up to 24 hours before their first match, where the replacement players did not need to be in the preliminary squad.

The age listed for each player is on 7 June 2019, the first day of the tournament. The numbers of caps and goals listed for each player do not include any matches played after the start of the tournament. The club listed is the club for which the player last played a competitive match prior to the tournament. A flag is included for coaches who are of a different nationality than their own national team.

== Group A ==
=== France ===
Head coach: Corinne Diacre

The final 23-player squad was announced on 2 May 2019.

No.	Pos.	Player	Date of birth (age)	Caps	Goals	Club
1	GK	Solène Durand	20 November 1994 (aged 24)	0	0	(French Football Federation) Guingamp
2	DF	Ève Périsset	24 December 1994 (aged 24)	14	0	(French Football Federation) Paris Saint-Germain
3	DF	Wendie Renard	20 July 1990 (aged 28)	109	20	(French Football Federation) Lyon
4	DF	Marion Torrent	17 April 1992 (aged 27)	21	0	(French Football Federation) Montpellier
5	DF	Aïssatou Tounkara	16 March 1995 (aged 24)	11	0	(Royal Spanish Football Federation) Atlético Madrid
6	MF	Amandine Henry (captain)	28 September 1989 (aged 29)	83	11	(French Football Federation) Lyon
7	DF	Sakina Karchaoui	26 January 1996 (aged 23)	24	0	(French Football Federation) Montpellier
8	MF	Grace Geyoro	2 July 1997 (aged 21)	21	1	(French Football Federation) Paris Saint-Germain
9	FW	Eugénie Le Sommer	18 May 1989 (aged 30)	159	73	(French Football Federation) Lyon
10	DF	Amel Majri	25 January 1993 (aged 26)	46	4	(French Football Federation) Lyon
11	FW	Kadidiatou Diani	1 April 1995 (aged 24)	46	5	(French Football Federation) Paris Saint-Germain
12	FW	Emelyne Laurent	4 November 1998 (aged 20)	4	0	(French Football Federation) Guingamp
13	FW	Valérie Gauvin	1 June 1996 (aged 23)	18	10	(French Football Federation) Montpellier
14	MF	Charlotte Bilbault	5 June 1990 (aged 29)	15	0	(French Football Federation) Paris FC
15	MF	Élise Bussaglia	24 September 1985 (aged 33)	187	29	(French Football Federation) Dijon
16	GK	Sarah Bouhaddi	17 October 1986 (aged 32)	140	0	(French Football Federation) Lyon
17	MF	Gaëtane Thiney	28 October 1985 (aged 33)	155	58	(French Football Federation) Paris FC
18	FW	Viviane Asseyi	20 November 1993 (aged 25)	31	4	(French Football Federation) Bordeaux
19	DF	Griedge Mbock Bathy	26 February 1995 (aged 24)	50	4	(French Football Federation) Lyon
20	FW	Delphine Cascarino	5 February 1997 (aged 22)	12	1	(French Football Federation) Lyon
21	GK	Pauline Peyraud-Magnin	17 March 1992 (aged 27)	1	0	(The Football Association) Arsenal
22	DF	Julie Debever	18 April 1988 (aged 31)	2	0	(French Football Federation) Guingamp
23	MF	Maéva Clemaron	10 November 1992 (aged 26)	3	0	(French Football Federation) Fleury

=== Nigeria ===
Head coach: (Sweden) Thomas Dennerby

A 27-player provisional squad was revealed on 13 May 2019. The final 23-player squad was announced on 24 May 2019.

No.	Pos.	Player	Date of birth (age)	Caps	Goals	Club
1	GK	Tochukwu Oluehi	2 May 1987 (aged 32)			(Nigeria Football Federation) Rivers Angels
2	MF	Amarachi Okoronkwo	12 December 1992 (aged 26)			(Nigeria Football Federation) Nasarawa Amazons
3	DF	Osinachi Ohale	21 December 1991 (aged 27)	26	1	(Swedish Football Association) Växjö
4	DF	Ngozi Ebere	5 August 1991 (aged 27)	20	1	(Norwegian Football Federation) Arna-Bjørnar
5	DF	Onome Ebi	8 May 1983 (aged 36)	81	0	(Chinese Football Association) Henan Huishang
6	MF	Evelyn Nwabuoku	14 November 1985 (aged 33)	42	3	(Nigeria Football Federation) Rivers Angels
7	FW	Anam Imo	30 November 2000 (aged 18)			(Swedish Football Association) Rosengård
8	FW	Asisat Oshoala	9 October 1994 (aged 24)	17	11	(Royal Spanish Football Federation) Barcelona
9	FW	Desire Oparanozie (captain)	17 December 1993 (aged 25)	35	22	(French Football Federation) Guingamp
10	MF	Rita Chikwelu	6 March 1988 (aged 31)	33	15	(Swedish Football Association) Kristianstads
11	FW	Chinaza Uchendu	3 December 1997 (aged 21)			(Portuguese Football Federation) Braga
12	FW	Uchenna Kanu	27 June 1997 (aged 21)	1	0	(United States Soccer Federation) Southeastern Fire
13	MF	Ngozi Okobi-Okeoghene	14 December 1993 (aged 25)	27	4	(Swedish Football Association) Eskilstuna United
14	DF	Faith Michael	28 February 1987 (aged 32)	53	0	(Swedish Football Association) Piteå
15	FW	Rasheedat Ajibade	8 December 1999 (aged 19)			(Norwegian Football Federation) Avaldsnes
16	GK	Chiamaka Nnadozie	8 December 2000 (aged 18)			(Nigeria Football Federation) Rivers Angels
17	FW	Francisca Ordega	19 October 1993 (aged 25)	26	7	(Chinese Football Association) Shanghai
18	MF	Halimatu Ayinde	16 May 1995 (aged 24)	12	0	(Swedish Football Association) Eskilstuna United
19	FW	Chinwendu Ihezuo	30 April 1997 (aged 22)			(Chinese Football Association) Henan Huishang
20	DF	Chidinma Okeke	11 August 2000 (aged 18)			(Nigeria Football Federation) Robo Queens
21	GK	Alaba Jonathan	1 June 1992 (aged 27)			(Nigeria Football Federation) Bayelsa Queens
22	FW	Alice Ogebe	30 March 1995 (aged 24)	7	0	(Nigeria Football Federation) Rivers Angels
23	MF	Ogonna Chukwudi	14 September 1988 (aged 30)	20	3	(Swedish Football Association) Djurgården

=== Norway ===
Head coach: (Sweden) Martin Sjögren

The final 23-player squad was announced on 2 May 2019.

No.	Pos.	Player	Date of birth (age)	Caps	Goals	Club
1	GK	Ingrid Hjelmseth	10 April 1980 (aged 39)	132	0	(Norwegian Football Federation) Stabæk
2	DF	Ingrid Moe Wold	29 January 1990 (aged 29)	60	3	(Norwegian Football Federation) LSK Kvinner
3	DF	Maria Thorisdottir	5 June 1993 (aged 26)	32	1	(The Football Association) Chelsea
4	DF	Stine Hovland	31 January 1991 (aged 28)	7	0	(Norwegian Football Federation) Sandviken
5	MF	Synne Skinnes Hansen	12 August 1995 (aged 23)	14	0	(Norwegian Football Federation) LSK Kvinner
6	DF	Maren Mjelde (captain)	6 November 1989 (aged 29)	136	19	(The Football Association) Chelsea
7	FW	Elise Thorsnes	14 August 1988 (aged 30)	116	19	(Norwegian Football Federation) LSK Kvinner
8	MF	Vilde Bøe Risa	13 July 1995 (aged 23)	19	2	(Swedish Football Association) Kopparbergs/Göteborg
9	FW	Isabell Herlovsen	23 June 1988 (aged 30)	126	60	(Norwegian Football Federation) Kolbotn
10	FW	Caroline Graham Hansen	18 February 1995 (aged 24)	72	25	(German Football Association) VfL Wolfsburg
11	FW	Lisa-Marie Karlseng Utland	19 September 1992 (aged 26)	41	14	(Swedish Football Association) Rosengård
12	GK	Cecilie Fiskerstrand	20 March 1996 (aged 23)	21	0	(Norwegian Football Federation) LSK Kvinner
13	FW	Therese Åsland	26 August 1995 (aged 23)	6	1	(Norwegian Football Federation) LSK Kvinner
14	MF	Ingrid Syrstad Engen	29 April 1998 (aged 21)	16	2	(Norwegian Football Federation) LSK Kvinner
15	MF	Amalie Eikeland	26 August 1995 (aged 23)	6	0	(Norwegian Football Federation) Sandviken
16	FW	Guro Reiten	26 July 1994 (aged 24)	37	5	(Norwegian Football Federation) LSK Kvinner
17	MF	Kristine Minde	8 August 1992 (aged 26)	97	9	(German Football Association) VfL Wolfsburg
18	MF	Frida Maanum	16 July 1999 (aged 19)	20	0	(Swedish Football Association) Linköping
19	DF	Cecilie Redisch Kvamme	9 November 1995 (aged 23)	3	0	(Norwegian Football Federation) Sandviken
20	FW	Emilie Haavi	16 June 1992 (aged 26)	82	16	(Norwegian Football Federation) LSK Kvinner
21	MF	Karina Sævik	24 March 1996 (aged 23)	4	1	(Norwegian Football Federation) Kolbotn
22	FW	Emilie Nautnes	13 January 1999 (aged 20)	6	1	(Norwegian Football Federation) Arna-Bjørnar
23	GK	Oda Maria Hove Bogstad	24 April 1996 (aged 23)	0	0	(Norwegian Football Federation) Arna-Bjørnar

=== South Korea ===
Head coach: Yoon Deok-yeo

A 28-player provisional squad was revealed on 30 April 2019. The final 23-player squad was announced on 17 May 2019.

No.	Pos.	Player	Date of birth (age)	Caps	Goals	Club
1	GK	Kang Ga-ae	10 December 1990 (aged 28)	13	0	(Korea Football Association) Gumi Sportstoto
2	DF	Lee Eun-mi	18 August 1988 (aged 30)	87	14	(Korea Football Association) Suwon UDC
3	DF	Jeong Yeong-a	9 December 1990 (aged 28)	12	0	(Korea Football Association) Gyeongju KHNP
4	DF	Hwang Bo-ram	6 October 1987 (aged 31)	42	0	(Korea Football Association) Hwacheon KSPO
5	DF	Kim Do-yeon	7 December 1988 (aged 30)	79	1	(Korea Football Association) Hyundai Steel Red Angels
6	DF	Lim Seon-joo	27 November 1990 (aged 28)	76	5	(Korea Football Association) Hyundai Steel Red Angels
7	MF	Lee Min-a	8 November 1991 (aged 27)	56	14	(Japan Football Association) INAC Kobe Leonessa
8	MF	Cho So-hyun (captain)	24 June 1988 (aged 30)	120	20	(The Football Association) West Ham United
9	MF	Moon Mi-ra	28 February 1992 (aged 27)	22	11	(Korea Football Association) Suwon UDC
10	FW	Ji So-yun	21 February 1991 (aged 28)	115	54	(The Football Association) Chelsea
11	FW	Jung Seol-bin	6 January 1990 (aged 29)	74	21	(Korea Football Association) Hyundai Steel Red Angels
12	FW	Kang Yu-mi	5 October 1991 (aged 27)	25	8	(Korea Football Association) Hwacheon KSPO
13	FW	Yeo Min-ji	27 April 1993 (aged 26)	34	12	(Korea Football Association) Suwon UDC
14	DF	Shin Dam-yeong	2 October 1993 (aged 25)	37	1	(Korea Football Association) Hyundai Steel Red Angels
15	MF	Lee Young-ju	22 April 1992 (aged 27)	28	2	(Korea Football Association) Hyundai Steel Red Angels
16	DF	Jang Sel-gi	31 May 1994 (aged 25)	54	11	(Korea Football Association) Hyundai Steel Red Angels
17	FW	Lee Geum-min	7 April 1994 (aged 25)	50	16	(Korea Football Association) Gyeongju KHNP
18	GK	Kim Min-jeong	12 September 1996 (aged 22)	2	0	(Korea Football Association) Hyundai Steel Red Angels
19	MF	Lee So-dam	12 October 1994 (aged 24)	49	5	(Korea Football Association) Hyundai Steel Red Angels
20	DF	Kim Hye-ri	25 June 1990 (aged 28)	80	1	(Korea Football Association) Hyundai Steel Red Angels
21	GK	Jung Bo-ram	22 July 1991 (aged 27)	3	0	(Korea Football Association) Hwacheon KSPO
22	FW	Son Hwa-yeon	15 March 1997 (aged 22)	20	7	(Korea Football Association) Changnyeong
23	FW	Kang Chae-rim	23 March 1998 (aged 21)	1	0	(Korea Football Association) Hyundai Steel Red Angels

== Group B ==
=== China ===
Head coach: Jia Xiuquan

A 26-player provisional squad was revealed on 24 May 2019. The final squad was announced on 27 May.

No.	Pos.	Player	Date of birth (age)	Caps	Goals	Club
1	GK	Xu Huan	6 March 1999 (aged 20)	1	0	(Chinese Football Association) Beijing Phoenix
2	DF	Liu Shanshan	16 March 1992 (aged 27)	110	1	(Chinese Football Association) Beijing Phoenix
3	DF	Lin Yuping	28 February 1992 (aged 27)	13	0	(Chinese Football Association) Wuhan Jianghan University
4	MF	Lou Jiahui	26 May 1991 (aged 28)	112	4	(Chinese Football Association) Henan Huishang
5	DF	Wu Haiyan (captain)	26 February 1993 (aged 26)	114	0	(Chinese Football Association) Wuhan Jianghan University
6	DF	Han Peng	20 December 1989 (aged 29)	93	4	(Chinese Football Association) Guangdong Huijun
7	MF	Wang Shuang	23 January 1995 (aged 24)	96	26	(French Football Federation) Paris Saint-Germain
8	DF	Li Jiayue	8 June 1990 (aged 28)	67	1	(Chinese Football Association) Shanghai
9	FW	Yang Li	26 February 1993 (aged 26)	59	31	(Chinese Football Association) Jiangsu Suning
10	FW	Li Ying	7 January 1993 (aged 26)	108	26	(Chinese Football Association) Guangdong Huijun
11	FW	Wang Shanshan	27 January 1990 (aged 29)	132	46	(Chinese Football Association) Dalian Quanjian
12	GK	Peng Shimeng	12 May 1998 (aged 21)	15	0	(Chinese Football Association) Jiangsu Suning
13	MF	Wang Yan	22 August 1991 (aged 27)	28	0	(Chinese Football Association) Beijing Phoenix
14	DF	Wang Ying	18 November 1997 (aged 21)	4	0	(Chinese Football Association) Wuhan Jianghan University
15	FW	Song Duan	2 August 1995 (aged 23)	23	7	(Chinese Football Association) Dalian Quanjian
16	MF	Li Wen	21 February 1989 (aged 30)	32	3	(Chinese Football Association) Dalian Quanjian
17	MF	Gu Yasha	28 November 1990 (aged 28)	117	13	(Chinese Football Association) Beijing Phoenix
18	GK	Bi Xiaolin	18 September 1989 (aged 29)	35	0	(Chinese Football Association) Dalian Quanjian
19	MF	Tan Ruyin	17 July 1994 (aged 24)	52	1	(Chinese Football Association) Guangdong Huijun
20	MF	Zhang Rui	17 January 1989 (aged 30)	145	24	(Chinese Football Association) Changchun Zhuoyue
21	MF	Yao Wei	1 September 1997 (aged 21)	14	3	(Chinese Football Association) Wuhan Jianghan University
22	DF	Luo Guiping	20 April 1993 (aged 26)	1	0	(Chinese Football Association) Guangdong Huijun
23	MF	Liu Yanqiu	31 December 1995 (aged 23)	2	0	(Chinese Football Association) Wuhan Jianghan University

=== Germany ===
Head coach: Martina Voss-Tecklenburg

The final 23-player squad was announced on 14 May 2019, as well as 5 players being named as a standby list.

No.	Pos.	Player	Date of birth (age)	Caps	Goals	Club
1	GK	Almuth Schult	9 February 1991 (aged 28)	59	0	(German Football Association) VfL Wolfsburg
2	DF	Carolin Simon	24 November 1992 (aged 26)	15	3	(French Football Federation) Lyon
3	DF	Kathrin Hendrich	6 April 1992 (aged 27)	29	4	(German Football Association) Bayern Munich
4	DF	Leonie Maier	29 September 1992 (aged 26)	69	10	(German Football Association) Bayern Munich
5	DF	Marina Hegering	17 April 1990 (aged 29)	3	0	(German Football Association) SGS Essen
6	MF	Lena Oberdorf	19 December 2001 (aged 17)	3	0	(German Football Association) SGS Essen
7	FW	Lea Schüller	12 November 1997 (aged 21)	13	8	(German Football Association) SGS Essen
8	MF	Lena Goeßling	8 March 1986 (aged 33)	105	10	(German Football Association) VfL Wolfsburg
9	FW	Svenja Huth	25 January 1991 (aged 28)	44	7	(German Football Association) Turbine Potsdam
10	MF	Dzsenifer Marozsán	18 April 1992 (aged 27)	90	32	(French Football Federation) Lyon
11	FW	Alexandra Popp (captain)	6 April 1991 (aged 28)	96	46	(German Football Association) VfL Wolfsburg
12	GK	Laura Benkarth	14 October 1992 (aged 26)	8	0	(German Football Association) Bayern Munich
13	MF	Sara Däbritz	15 February 1995 (aged 24)	60	10	(German Football Association) Bayern Munich
14	DF	Johanna Elsig	1 November 1992 (aged 26)	12	0	(German Football Association) Turbine Potsdam
15	DF	Giulia Gwinn	2 July 1999 (aged 19)	8	1	(German Football Association) SC Freiburg
16	MF	Linda Dallmann	2 September 1994 (aged 24)	21	5	(German Football Association) SGS Essen
17	DF	Verena Schweers	22 May 1989 (aged 30)	44	3	(German Football Association) Bayern Munich
18	MF	Melanie Leupolz	14 April 1994 (aged 25)	58	8	(German Football Association) Bayern Munich
19	FW	Klara Bühl	7 December 2000 (aged 18)	2	0	(German Football Association) SC Freiburg
20	MF	Lina Magull	15 August 1994 (aged 24)	31	7	(German Football Association) Bayern Munich
21	GK	Merle Frohms	28 January 1995 (aged 24)	4	0	(German Football Association) SC Freiburg
22	FW	Turid Knaak	24 January 1991 (aged 28)	8	1	(German Football Association) SGS Essen
23	DF	Sara Doorsoun	17 November 1991 (aged 27)	25	0	(German Football Association) VfL Wolfsburg

=== South Africa ===
Head coach: Desiree Ellis

The final 23-player squad was announced on 17 May 2019.

No.	Pos.	Player	Date of birth (age)	Caps	Goals	Club
1	GK	Mapaseka Mpuru	9 April 1998 (aged 21)	0	0	(South African Football Association) University of Pretoria
2	DF	Lebogang Ramalepe	3 December 1991 (aged 27)	63	1	(South African Football Association) Ma-Indies
3	DF	Nothando Vilakazi	28 October 1988 (aged 30)	130	6	(Lithuanian Football Federation) Gintra Universitetas
4	DF	Noko Matlou	30 September 1985 (aged 33)	153	61	(South African Football Association) Ma-Indies
5	DF	Janine van Wyk (captain)	17 April 1987 (aged 32)	166	11	(South African Football Association) JVW
6	MF	Mamello Makhabane	24 February 1988 (aged 31)	96	18	(South African Football Association) JVW
7	MF	Karabo Dhlamini	18 September 2001 (aged 17)	5	0	(South African Football Association) Mamelodi Sundowns
8	FW	Ode Fulutudilu	6 February 1990 (aged 29)	12	1	(Royal Spanish Football Federation) Málaga
9	FW	Amanda Mthandi	23 May 1996 (aged 23)	10	2	(South African Football Association) University of Johannesburg
10	FW	Linda Motlhalo	1 July 1998 (aged 20)	43	9	(Chinese Football Association) Beijing Phoenix
11	FW	Thembi Kgatlana	2 May 1996 (aged 23)	53	7	(Chinese Football Association) Beijing Phoenix
12	FW	Jermaine Seoposenwe	12 October 1993 (aged 25)	74	6	(Lithuanian Football Federation) Gintra Universitetas
13	MF	Bambanani Mbane	12 March 1990 (aged 29)	44	0	(South African Football Association) Bloemfontein Celtic
14	DF	Tiisetso Makhubela	24 April 1997 (aged 22)	2	0	(South African Football Association) Mamelodi Sundowns
15	MF	Refiloe Jane	4 August 1992 (aged 26)	105	12	Unattached
16	GK	Andile Dlamini	2 September 1992 (aged 26)	38	0	(South African Football Association) Mamelodi Sundowns
17	MF	Leandra Smeda	22 July 1989 (aged 29)	95	10	(Swedish Football Association) Vittsjö
18	DF	Bongeka Gamede	22 May 1999 (aged 20)	1	0	(South African Football Association) University of the Western Cape
19	MF	Kholosa Biyana	16 April 1994 (aged 25)	18	1	(South African Football Association) University of KwaZulu-Natal
20	GK	Kaylin Swart	30 September 1994 (aged 24)	18	0	(South African Football Association) Golden Stars
21	FW	Busisiwe Ndimeni	25 June 1991 (aged 27)	27	0	(South African Football Association) Tshwane University of Technology
22	FW	Rhoda Mulaudzi	2 December 1989 (aged 29)	23	0	Unattached
23	MF	Sibulele Holweni	28 April 2001 (aged 18)	2	0	(South African Football Association) Sophakama Ladies/HPC

=== Spain ===
Head coach: Jorge Vilda

The final 23-player squad was announced on 20 May 2019.

No.	Pos.	Player	Date of birth (age)	Caps	Goals	Club
1	GK	Lola Gallardo	10 June 1993 (aged 25)	29	0	(Royal Spanish Football Federation) Atlético Madrid
2	DF	Celia Jiménez	20 June 1995 (aged 23)	22	0	(United States Soccer Federation) Reign FC
3	DF	Leila Ouahabi	22 March 1993 (aged 26)	27	1	(Royal Spanish Football Federation) Barcelona
4	DF	Irene Paredes	4 July 1991 (aged 27)	62	8	(French Football Federation) Paris Saint-Germain
5	DF	Ivana Andrés	13 July 1994 (aged 24)	21	0	(Royal Spanish Football Federation) Levante
6	MF	Vicky Losada	5 March 1991 (aged 28)	62	13	(Royal Spanish Football Federation) Barcelona
7	DF	Marta Corredera	8 August 1991 (aged 27)	67	5	(Royal Spanish Football Federation) Levante
8	DF	Marta Torrejón (captain)	27 February 1990 (aged 29)	86	9	(Royal Spanish Football Federation) Barcelona
9	FW	Mariona Caldentey	19 March 1996 (aged 23)	21	2	(Royal Spanish Football Federation) Barcelona
10	FW	Jennifer Hermoso	9 May 1990 (aged 29)	67	28	(Royal Spanish Football Federation) Atlético Madrid
11	FW	Alexia Putellas	4 February 1994 (aged 25)	66	13	(Royal Spanish Football Federation) Barcelona
12	MF	Patricia Guijarro	17 May 1998 (aged 21)	17	3	(Royal Spanish Football Federation) Barcelona
13	GK	Sandra Paños	4 November 1992 (aged 26)	29	0	(Royal Spanish Football Federation) Barcelona
14	MF	Virginia Torrecilla	4 September 1994 (aged 24)	54	6	(French Football Federation) Montpellier
15	MF	Silvia Meseguer	12 March 1989 (aged 30)	65	5	(Royal Spanish Football Federation) Atlético Madrid
16	DF	María Pilar León	13 June 1995 (aged 23)	24	0	(Royal Spanish Football Federation) Barcelona
17	FW	Lucía García	14 July 1998 (aged 20)	14	0	(Royal Spanish Football Federation) Athletic Bilbao
18	MF	Aitana Bonmatí	18 January 1998 (aged 21)	13	1	(Royal Spanish Football Federation) Barcelona
19	FW	Amanda Sampedro	26 June 1993 (aged 25)	46	11	(Royal Spanish Football Federation) Atlético Madrid
20	DF	Andrea Pereira	19 September 1993 (aged 25)	26	0	(Royal Spanish Football Federation) Barcelona
21	MF	Andrea Falcón	28 February 1997 (aged 22)	7	1	(Royal Spanish Football Federation) Atlético Madrid
22	FW	Nahikari García	10 March 1997 (aged 22)	8	1	(Royal Spanish Football Federation) Real Sociedad
23	GK	María Asunción Quiñones	29 October 1996 (aged 22)	3	0	(Royal Spanish Football Federation) Real Sociedad

== Group C ==
=== Australia ===
Head coach: Ante Milicic

The final 23-player squad was announced on 14 May 2019, as well as Kyra Cooney-Cross and Kyah Simon being named as standby players. Laura Alleway was ruled out due to injury and was replaced by Karly Roestbakken on 6 June 2019.

No.	Pos.	Player	Date of birth (age)	Caps	Goals	Club
1	GK	Lydia Williams	13 May 1988 (aged 31)	78	0	(United States Soccer Federation) Reign FC
2	DF	Gema Simon	19 July 1990 (aged 28)	11	0	(Football Australia) Newcastle Jets
3	MF	Aivi Luik	18 March 1985 (aged 34)	21	0	(Royal Spanish Football Federation) Levante
4	DF	Clare Polkinghorne	1 February 1989 (aged 30)	117	9	(United States Soccer Federation) Houston Dash
5	DF	Karly Roestbakken	17 January 2001 (aged 18)	0	0	(Football Australia) Canberra United
6	MF	Chloe Logarzo	22 December 1994 (aged 24)	38	6	(United States Soccer Federation) Washington Spirit
7	DF	Steph Catley	26 January 1994 (aged 25)	72	2	(United States Soccer Federation) Reign FC
8	MF	Elise Kellond-Knight	10 August 1990 (aged 28)	106	1	(United States Soccer Federation) Reign FC
9	FW	Caitlin Foord	11 November 1994 (aged 24)	72	16	(United States Soccer Federation) Portland Thorns
10	MF	Emily van Egmond	12 July 1993 (aged 25)	86	18	(United States Soccer Federation) Orlando Pride
11	FW	Lisa De Vanna	14 November 1984 (aged 34)	148	47	(Football Australia) Sydney FC
12	GK	Teagan Micah	20 October 1997 (aged 21)	0	0	(United States Soccer Federation) UCLA Bruins
13	MF	Tameka Yallop	16 June 1991 (aged 27)	79	10	(Norwegian Football Federation) Klepp
14	DF	Alanna Kennedy	21 January 1995 (aged 24)	78	7	(United States Soccer Federation) Orlando Pride
15	FW	Emily Gielnik	13 May 1992 (aged 27)	29	7	(Football Australia) Melbourne Victory
16	FW	Hayley Raso	5 September 1994 (aged 24)	35	3	(United States Soccer Federation) Portland Thorns
17	MF	Mary Fowler	14 February 2003 (aged 16)	4	0	(Football Australia) Bankstown City
18	GK	Mackenzie Arnold	25 February 1994 (aged 25)	23	0	(Football Australia) Brisbane Roar
19	MF	Katrina Gorry	13 August 1992 (aged 26)	74	14	(Football Australia) Brisbane Roar
20	FW	Sam Kerr (captain)	10 September 1993 (aged 25)	77	31	(United States Soccer Federation) Chicago Red Stars
21	DF	Ellie Carpenter	28 April 2000 (aged 19)	32	1	(United States Soccer Federation) Portland Thorns
22	MF	Amy Harrison	21 April 1996 (aged 23)	10	0	(United States Soccer Federation) Washington Spirit
23	DF	Teigen Allen	12 February 1994 (aged 25)	40	0	(Football Australia) Melbourne Victory

=== Brazil ===
Head coach: Vadão

The final 23-player squad was announced on 16 May 2019. On 17 May 2019, Adriana was replaced by Luana due to injury. On 3 June 2019, Fabiana was replaced by Poliana due to injury. On 7 June 2019, Érika was replaced by Daiane due to injury.

No.	Pos.	Player	Date of birth (age)	Caps	Goals	Club
1	GK	Bárbara	4 July 1988 (aged 30)	70	0	(Brazilian Football Confederation) Kindermann
2	DF	Poliana	6 February 1991 (aged 28)	61	5	(Brazilian Football Confederation) São José
3	DF	Daiane	7 September 1997 (aged 21)	4	0	(French Football Federation) Paris Saint-Germain
4	DF	Tayla	9 May 1992 (aged 27)	17	1	(Portuguese Football Federation) Benfica
5	MF	Thaisa	17 December 1988 (aged 30)	78	5	(Italian Football Federation) Milan
6	DF	Tamires	10 October 1987 (aged 31)	90	4	(Danish Football Association) Fortuna Hjørring
7	FW	Andressa	10 November 1992 (aged 26)	82	18	(Royal Spanish Football Federation) Barcelona
8	MF	Formiga	3 March 1978 (aged 41)	186	26	(French Football Federation) Paris Saint-Germain
9	FW	Debinha	20 October 1991 (aged 27)	81	28	(United States Soccer Federation) North Carolina Courage
10	FW	Marta (captain)	19 February 1986 (aged 33)	144	105	(United States Soccer Federation) Orlando Pride
11	FW	Cristiane	15 May 1985 (aged 34)	138	89	(Brazilian Football Confederation) São Paulo
12	GK	Aline	15 April 1989 (aged 30)	8	0	(Royal Spanish Football Federation) Granadilla
13	DF	Letícia Santos	2 December 1994 (aged 24)	20	0	(German Football Association) SC Sand
14	DF	Kathellen	26 April 1996 (aged 23)	4	0	(French Football Federation) Bordeaux
15	DF	Camila	10 October 1994 (aged 24)	17	2	(United States Soccer Federation) Orlando Pride
16	FW	Beatriz	17 December 1993 (aged 25)	68	22	(Korea Football Association) Hyundai Steel Red Angels
17	MF	Andressinha	1 May 1995 (aged 24)	69	10	(United States Soccer Federation) Portland Thorns
18	MF	Luana	2 May 1993 (aged 26)	7	0	(Korea Football Association) Hwacheon KSPO
19	FW	Ludmila	11 December 1994 (aged 24)	12	1	(Royal Spanish Football Federation) Atlético Madrid
20	FW	Raquel	21 March 1991 (aged 28)	46	8	(Royal Spanish Football Federation) Sporting Huelva
21	DF	Mônica	21 April 1987 (aged 32)	58	9	(Brazilian Football Confederation) Corinthians
22	GK	Letícia Izidoro	13 August 1994 (aged 24)	1	0	(Brazilian Football Confederation) Corinthians
23	FW	Geyse	27 March 1998 (aged 21)	7	0	(Portuguese Football Federation) Benfica

=== Italy ===
Head coach: Milena Bertolini

A 26-player provisional squad was revealed on 30 April 2019. The final 23-player squad was announced on 24 May 2019.

No.	Pos.	Player	Date of birth (age)	Caps	Goals	Club
1	GK	Laura Giuliani	6 June 1993 (aged 26)	35	0	(Italian Football Federation) Juventus
2	MF	Valentina Bergamaschi	22 January 1997 (aged 22)	15	3	(Italian Football Federation) Milan
3	DF	Sara Gama (captain)	27 March 1989 (aged 30)	96	5	(Italian Football Federation) Juventus
4	MF	Aurora Galli	13 December 1996 (aged 22)	23	1	(Italian Football Federation) Juventus
5	DF	Elena Linari	15 April 1994 (aged 25)	29	0	(Royal Spanish Football Federation) Atlético Madrid
6	MF	Martina Rosucci	9 May 1992 (aged 27)	36	1	(Italian Football Federation) Juventus
7	DF	Alia Guagni	1 October 1987 (aged 31)	62	5	(Italian Football Federation) Fiorentina
8	MF	Alice Parisi	11 December 1990 (aged 28)	46	5	(Italian Football Federation) Fiorentina
9	FW	Daniela Sabatino	26 June 1985 (aged 33)	46	21	(Italian Football Federation) Milan
10	FW	Cristiana Girelli	23 April 1990 (aged 29)	52	28	(Italian Football Federation) Juventus
11	FW	Barbara Bonansea	13 June 1991 (aged 27)	49	17	(Italian Football Federation) Juventus
12	GK	Chiara Marchitelli	4 May 1985 (aged 34)	40	0	(Italian Football Federation) Florentia
13	DF	Elisa Bartoli	7 May 1991 (aged 28)	46	1	(Italian Football Federation) Roma
14	FW	Stefania Tarenzi	29 February 1988 (aged 31)	3	1	(Italian Football Federation) ChievoVerona Valpo
15	MF	Annamaria Serturini	13 May 1998 (aged 21)	0	0	(Italian Football Federation) Roma
16	DF	Laura Fusetti	8 October 1990 (aged 28)	0	0	(Italian Football Federation) Milan
17	DF	Lisa Boattin	3 May 1997 (aged 22)	11	0	(Italian Football Federation) Juventus
18	FW	Ilaria Mauro	22 May 1988 (aged 31)	25	8	(Italian Football Federation) Fiorentina
19	FW	Valentina Giacinti	2 January 1994 (aged 25)	20	3	(Italian Football Federation) Milan
20	DF	Linda Tucceri Cimini	4 April 1991 (aged 28)	8	1	(Italian Football Federation) Milan
21	MF	Valentina Cernoia	22 June 1991 (aged 27)	31	6	(Italian Football Federation) Juventus
22	GK	Rosalia Pipitone	3 August 1985 (aged 33)	3	0	(Italian Football Federation) Roma
23	MF	Manuela Giugliano	18 August 1997 (aged 21)	21	3	(Italian Football Federation) Milan

=== Jamaica ===
Head coach: Hue Menzies

22 players of the final 23-player squad were announced on 22 May 2019. Havana Solaun was named as the 23rd player on 23 May 2019 after receiving clearance from FIFA. Mireya Grey replaced injured Kayla McCoy on 6 June 2019.

No.	Pos.	Player	Date of birth (age)	Caps	Goals	Club
1	GK	Sydney Schneider	31 August 1999 (aged 19)	11	0	(United States Soccer Federation) UNC Wilmington Seahawks
2	DF	Lauren Silver	22 March 1993 (aged 26)	19	1	(Norwegian Football Federation) Trondheims-Ørn
3	FW	Chanel Hudson-Marks	14 September 1997 (aged 21)	4	0	(United States Soccer Federation) Memphis Tigers
4	MF	Chantelle Swaby	6 August 1998 (aged 20)	10	0	(United States Soccer Federation) Rutgers Scarlet Knights
5	DF	Konya Plummer (captain)	2 August 1997 (aged 21)	17	1	(United States Soccer Federation) UCF Knights
6	MF	Havana Solaun	23 March 1993 (aged 26)	2	0	(Norwegian Football Federation) Klepp
7	MF	Chinyelu Asher	20 May 1993 (aged 26)	23	3	(Norwegian Football Federation) Stabæk
8	FW	Ashleigh Shim	11 November 1993 (aged 25)	6	1	Unattached
9	MF	Marlo Sweatman	1 December 1994 (aged 24)	14	3	(Hungarian Football Federation) Szent Mihály
10	FW	Jody Brown	16 April 2002 (aged 17)	13	8	(United States Soccer Federation) Montverde Academy
11	FW	Khadija Shaw	31 January 1997 (aged 22)	22	31	(United States Soccer Federation) Tennessee Volunteers
12	DF	Sashana Campbell	2 March 1991 (aged 28)	9	2	(Israel Football Association) Maccabi Kishronot Hadera
13	GK	Nicole McClure	16 November 1989 (aged 29)	10	0	(Irish Football Association) Sion Swifts
14	DF	Deneisha Blackwood	7 March 1997 (aged 22)	14	2	(United States Soccer Federation) West Florida Argonauts
15	FW	Tiffany Cameron	16 October 1991 (aged 27)	3	0	(Norwegian Football Federation) Stabæk
16	DF	Dominique Bond-Flasza	11 September 1996 (aged 22)	17	2	(Royal Dutch Football Association) PSV
17	DF	Allyson Swaby	3 October 1996 (aged 22)	10	0	(Italian Football Federation) Roma
18	FW	Trudi Carter	18 November 1994 (aged 24)	14	3	(Italian Football Federation) Roma
19	MF	Toriana Patterson	2 February 1994 (aged 25)	10	0	(Italian Football Federation) Pink Sport Time
20	FW	Cheyna Matthews	10 November 1993 (aged 25)	3	0	(United States Soccer Federation) Washington Spirit
21	MF	Olufolasade Adamolekun	21 February 2001 (aged 18)	4	0	(United States Soccer Federation) United Soccer Alliance
22	FW	Mireya Grey	7 September 1998 (aged 20)	1	0	(United States Soccer Federation) Seattle Sounders
23	GK	Yazmeen Jamieson	17 March 1998 (aged 21)	3	0	(New Zealand Football) Papakura City

== Group D ==
=== Argentina ===
Head coach: Carlos Borrello

A 26-player provisional squad was revealed on 30 April 2019. The final 23-player squad was announced on 22 May 2019.

No.	Pos.	Player	Date of birth (age)	Caps	Goals	Club
1	GK	Vanina Correa	14 August 1983 (aged 35)	31	0	(Argentine Football Association) Rosario Central
2	DF	Agustina Barroso	20 May 1993 (aged 26)	36	0	(Royal Spanish Football Federation) Madrid CFF
3	DF	Eliana Stábile	26 November 1993 (aged 25)	13	2	(Argentine Football Association) Boca Juniors
4	DF	Adriana Sachs	25 December 1993 (aged 25)	24	0	(Argentine Football Association) UAI Urquiza
5	MF	Vanesa Santana	3 September 1990 (aged 28)	31	0	(Royal Spanish Football Federation) Logroño
6	DF	Aldana Cometti	3 March 1996 (aged 23)	32	3	(Royal Spanish Football Federation) Sevilla
7	FW	Yael Oviedo	22 May 1992 (aged 27)	24	2	(Royal Spanish Football Federation) Rayo Vallecano
8	MF	Ruth Bravo	6 March 1992 (aged 27)	18	1	(Royal Spanish Football Federation) Tacón
9	FW	Sole Jaimes	20 January 1989 (aged 30)	21	5	(French Football Federation) Lyon
10	FW	Estefanía Banini (captain)	21 June 1990 (aged 28)	32	9	(Royal Spanish Football Federation) Levante
11	FW	Florencia Bonsegundo	14 July 1993 (aged 25)	34	10	(Royal Spanish Football Federation) Sporting Huelva
12	GK	Gaby Garton	27 May 1990 (aged 29)	2	0	Unattached
13	DF	Virginia Gómez	26 February 1991 (aged 28)	8	0	(Argentine Football Association) Rosario Central
14	MF	Miriam Mayorga	20 November 1989 (aged 29)	9	0	(Argentine Football Association) UAI Urquiza
15	FW	Belén Potassa	12 December 1988 (aged 30)	28	7	(Argentine Football Association) UAI Urquiza
16	MF	Lorena Benítez	3 December 1998 (aged 20)	2	0	(Argentine Football Association) Boca Juniors
17	MF	Mariela Coronel	20 June 1981 (aged 37)	34	2	(Royal Spanish Football Federation) Granada
18	DF	Gabriela Chávez	9 April 1989 (aged 30)	18	0	(Argentine Football Association) River Plate
19	DF	Mariana Larroquette	24 October 1992 (aged 26)	36	8	(Argentine Football Association) UAI Urquiza
20	MF	Dalila Ippólito	24 March 2002 (aged 17)	1	0	(Argentine Football Association) River Plate
21	DF	Natalie Juncos	28 December 1990 (aged 28)	6	0	Unattached
22	FW	Milagros Menéndez	23 March 1997 (aged 22)	3	0	(Argentine Football Association) UAI Urquiza
23	GK	Solana Pereyra	5 April 1999 (aged 20)	0	0	(Argentine Football Association) UAI Urquiza

=== England ===
Head coach: Phil Neville

The final 23-player squad was announced on 8 May 2019.

No.	Pos.	Player	Date of birth (age)	Caps	Goals	Club
1	GK	Karen Bardsley	14 October 1984 (aged 34)	75	0	(The Football Association) Manchester City
2	DF	Lucy Bronze	28 October 1991 (aged 27)	67	7	(French Football Federation) Lyon
3	DF	Alex Greenwood	7 September 1993 (aged 25)	36	2	(The Football Association) Manchester United
4	MF	Keira Walsh	8 April 1997 (aged 22)	15	0	(The Football Association) Manchester City
5	DF	Steph Houghton (captain)	23 April 1988 (aged 31)	105	12	(The Football Association) Manchester City
6	DF	Millie Bright	21 August 1993 (aged 25)	26	0	(The Football Association) Chelsea
7	FW	Nikita Parris	10 March 1994 (aged 25)	33	11	(The Football Association) Manchester City
8	MF	Jill Scott	2 February 1987 (aged 32)	135	22	(The Football Association) Manchester City
9	FW	Jodie Taylor	17 May 1986 (aged 33)	40	17	(United States Soccer Federation) Reign FC
10	MF	Fran Kirby	29 June 1993 (aged 25)	38	12	(The Football Association) Chelsea
11	FW	Toni Duggan	25 July 1991 (aged 27)	72	22	(Royal Spanish Football Federation) Barcelona
12	DF	Demi Stokes	12 December 1991 (aged 27)	49	1	(The Football Association) Manchester City
13	GK	Carly Telford	7 July 1987 (aged 31)	17	0	(The Football Association) Chelsea
14	DF	Leah Williamson	29 March 1997 (aged 22)	6	0	(The Football Association) Arsenal
15	DF	Abbie McManus	14 January 1993 (aged 26)	13	0	(The Football Association) Manchester City
16	MF	Jade Moore	22 October 1990 (aged 28)	45	1	(The Football Association) Reading
17	DF	Rachel Daly	6 December 1991 (aged 27)	21	3	(United States Soccer Federation) Houston Dash
18	FW	Ellen White	9 May 1989 (aged 30)	81	28	(The Football Association) Birmingham City
19	MF	Georgia Stanway	3 January 1999 (aged 20)	7	1	(The Football Association) Manchester City
20	MF	Karen Carney	1 August 1987 (aged 31)	139	32	(The Football Association) Chelsea
21	GK	Mary Earps	7 March 1993 (aged 26)	5	0	(German Football Association) VfL Wolfsburg
22	FW	Beth Mead	9 May 1995 (aged 24)	13	5	(The Football Association) Arsenal
23	MF	Lucy Staniforth	2 October 1992 (aged 26)	9	2	(The Football Association) Birmingham City

=== Japan ===
Head coach: Asako Takakura

The final 23-player squad was announced on 10 May 2019. Riko Ueki injured her knee and was replaced by Saori Takarada on 31 May 2019.

No.	Pos.	Player	Date of birth (age)	Caps	Goals	Club
1	GK	Sakiko Ikeda	8 September 1992 (aged 26)	14	0	(Japan Football Association) Urawa Red Diamonds
2	MF	Rumi Utsugi	5 December 1988 (aged 30)	113	6	(United States Soccer Federation) Reign FC
3	DF	Aya Sameshima	16 June 1987 (aged 31)	109	5	(Japan Football Association) INAC Kobe Leonessa
4	DF	Saki Kumagai (captain)	17 October 1990 (aged 28)	104	0	(French Football Federation) Lyon
5	DF	Nana Ichise	4 August 1997 (aged 21)	16	0	(Japan Football Association) Vegalta Sendai
6	MF	Hina Sugita	31 January 1997 (aged 22)	7	0	(Japan Football Association) INAC Kobe Leonessa
7	MF	Emi Nakajima	27 September 1990 (aged 28)	70	14	(Japan Football Association) INAC Kobe Leonessa
8	FW	Mana Iwabuchi	18 March 1993 (aged 26)	61	20	(Japan Football Association) INAC Kobe Leonessa
9	FW	Yuika Sugasawa	5 October 1990 (aged 28)	63	18	(Japan Football Association) Urawa Red Diamonds
10	MF	Mizuho Sakaguchi	15 October 1987 (aged 31)	124	29	(Japan Football Association) Nippon TV Beleza
11	FW	Rikako Kobayashi	21 July 1997 (aged 21)	5	2	(Japan Football Association) Nippon TV Beleza
12	DF	Moeka Minami	7 December 1998 (aged 20)	5	0	(Japan Football Association) Urawa Red Diamonds
13	MF	Saori Takarada	27 December 1999 (aged 19)	0	0	(Japan Football Association) Cerezo Osaka Sakai
14	MF	Yui Hasegawa	29 January 1997 (aged 22)	36	6	(Japan Football Association) Nippon TV Beleza
15	FW	Yuka Momiki	9 April 1996 (aged 23)	25	8	(Japan Football Association) Nippon TV Beleza
16	DF	Asato Miyagawa	24 February 1998 (aged 21)	5	0	(Japan Football Association) Nippon TV Beleza
17	MF	Narumi Miura	3 July 1997 (aged 21)	9	0	(Japan Football Association) Nippon TV Beleza
18	GK	Ayaka Yamashita	29 September 1995 (aged 23)	27	0	(Japan Football Association) Nippon TV Beleza
19	FW	Jun Endo	24 May 2000 (aged 19)	5	0	(Japan Football Association) Nippon TV Beleza
20	FW	Kumi Yokoyama	13 August 1993 (aged 25)	41	17	(Japan Football Association) AC Nagano Parceiro
21	GK	Chika Hirao	31 December 1996 (aged 22)	2	0	(Japan Football Association) Albirex Niigata
22	DF	Risa Shimizu	15 June 1996 (aged 22)	24	0	(Japan Football Association) Nippon TV Beleza
23	DF	Shiori Miyake	13 October 1995 (aged 23)	18	0	(Japan Football Association) INAC Kobe Leonessa

=== Scotland ===
Head coach: Shelley Kerr

The final 23-player squad was announced on 15 May 2019.

No.	Pos.	Player	Date of birth (age)	Caps	Goals	Club
1	GK	Lee Alexander	23 September 1991 (aged 27)	17	0	(Scottish Football Association) Glasgow City
2	DF	Kirsty Smith	6 January 1994 (aged 25)	35	0	(The Football Association) Manchester United
3	DF	Nicola Docherty	23 August 1992 (aged 26)	19	0	(Scottish Football Association) Glasgow City
4	DF	Rachel Corsie (captain)	17 August 1989 (aged 29)	109	16	(United States Soccer Federation) Utah Royals
5	DF	Jen Beattie	13 May 1991 (aged 28)	124	22	(The Football Association) Manchester City
6	MF	Joanne Love	6 December 1985 (aged 33)	191	13	(Scottish Football Association) Glasgow City
7	DF	Hayley Lauder	4 June 1990 (aged 29)	99	9	(Scottish Football Association) Glasgow City
8	MF	Kim Little	29 June 1990 (aged 28)	133	53	(The Football Association) Arsenal
9	MF	Caroline Weir	20 June 1995 (aged 23)	63	8	(The Football Association) Manchester City
10	MF	Leanne Crichton	6 August 1987 (aged 31)	63	3	(Scottish Football Association) Glasgow City
11	FW	Lisa Evans	21 May 1992 (aged 27)	78	17	(The Football Association) Arsenal
12	GK	Shannon Lynn	22 October 1985 (aged 33)	30	0	(Swedish Football Association) Vittsjö
13	FW	Jane Ross	18 September 1989 (aged 29)	127	58	(The Football Association) West Ham United
14	DF	Chloe Arthur	21 January 1995 (aged 24)	19	0	(The Football Association) Birmingham City
15	DF	Sophie Howard	17 September 1993 (aged 25)	14	1	(The Football Association) Reading
16	MF	Christie Murray	3 May 1990 (aged 29)	61	4	(The Football Association) Liverpool
17	DF	Joelle Murray	7 November 1986 (aged 32)	48	1	(Scottish Football Association) Hibernian
18	FW	Claire Emslie	8 March 1994 (aged 25)	21	3	(The Football Association) Manchester City
19	FW	Lana Clelland	26 January 1993 (aged 26)	25	3	(Italian Football Federation) Fiorentina
20	FW	Fiona Brown	31 March 1995 (aged 24)	37	2	(Swedish Football Association) Rosengård
21	GK	Jenna Fife	1 December 1995 (aged 23)	4	0	(Scottish Football Association) Hibernian
22	FW	Erin Cuthbert	19 July 1998 (aged 20)	30	10	(The Football Association) Chelsea
23	FW	Lizzie Arnot	1 March 1996 (aged 23)	26	2	(The Football Association) Manchester United

== Group E ==
=== Cameroon ===
Head coach: Alain Djeumfa

A 26-player provisional squad was revealed on 4 May 2019. The final 23-player squad was announced on 24 May 2019.

No.	Pos.	Player	Date of birth (age)	Caps	Goals	Club
1	GK	Annette Ngo Ndom	3 June 1985 (aged 34)	50	0	(Cameroonian Football Federation) Amazone FAP
2	DF	Christine Manie (captain)	4 May 1984 (aged 35)	63	10	(French Football Federation) Yzeure
3	FW	Ajara Nchout	12 January 1993 (aged 26)	49	5	(Norwegian Football Federation) Vålerenga
4	DF	Yvonne Leuko	20 November 1991 (aged 27)	29	0	(French Football Federation) Strasbourg
5	DF	Augustine Ejangue	19 January 1989 (aged 30)	62	0	(Norwegian Football Federation) Arna-Bjørnar
6	DF	Estelle Johnson	21 July 1988 (aged 30)			(United States Soccer Federation) Sky Blue FC
7	FW	Gabrielle Onguéné	25 February 1989 (aged 30)	58	17	(Russian Football Union) CSKA Moscow
8	MF	Raissa Feudjio	29 September 1995 (aged 23)	60	1	(Royal Spanish Football Federation) Granadilla
9	FW	Madeleine Ngono Mani	16 October 1983 (aged 35)	128	49	(French Football Federation) Ambilly
10	MF	Jeannette Yango	12 June 1993 (aged 25)	38	1	(French Football Federation) Saint-Malo
11	DF	Aurelle Awona	2 February 1993 (aged 26)	4	0	(French Football Federation) Dijon
12	DF	Claudine Meffometou	1 July 1990 (aged 28)	31	1	(French Football Federation) Guingamp
13	MF	Charlène Meyong	19 November 1998 (aged 20)			(Cameroonian Football Federation) Louves Minproff
14	MF	Ninon Abena	5 September 1994 (aged 24)			(Cameroonian Football Federation) Louves Minproff
15	DF	Ysis Sonkeng	20 September 1989 (aged 29)			(Cameroonian Football Federation) Amazone FAP
16	GK	Isabelle Mambingo	10 April 1985 (aged 34)			(Nigeria Football Federation) Sunshine Queens
17	FW	Gaëlle Enganamouit	9 June 1992 (aged 26)	43	5	Unattached
18	FW	Henriette Akaba	7 June 1992 (aged 27)	38	0	(Turkish Football Federation) Beşiktaş
19	FW	Marlyse Ngo Ndoumbouk	3 January 1985 (aged 34)			(French Football Federation) Nancy
20	MF	Genevieve Ngo Mbeleck	10 March 1993 (aged 26)	14	1	(Cameroonian Football Federation) Amazone FAP
21	FW	Alexandra Takounda	7 July 2000 (aged 18)			(Cameroonian Football Federation) Eclair
22	MF	Michaela Abam	13 June 1997 (aged 21)			(French Football Federation) Paris FC
23	GK	Marthe Ongmahan	12 June 1992 (aged 26)	0	0	(Cameroonian Football Federation) AWA Yaoundé

=== Canada ===
Head coach: (Denmark) Kenneth Heiner-Møller

The final 23-player squad was announced on 25 May 2019.

No.	Pos.	Player	Date of birth (age)	Caps	Goals	Club
1	GK	Stephanie Labbé	10 October 1986 (aged 32)	61	0	(United States Soccer Federation) North Carolina Courage
2	DF	Allysha Chapman	25 January 1989 (aged 30)	64	1	(United States Soccer Federation) Houston Dash
3	DF	Kadeisha Buchanan	5 November 1995 (aged 23)	88	3	(French Football Federation) Lyon
4	DF	Shelina Zadorsky	24 August 1992 (aged 26)	52	1	(United States Soccer Federation) Orlando Pride
5	MF	Quinn (Note: Then known as Rebecca Quinn)	11 August 1995 (aged 23)	48	5	(French Football Federation) Paris FC
6	FW	Deanne Rose	3 March 1999 (aged 20)	40	8	(United States Soccer Federation) Florida Gators
7	MF	Julia Grosso	29 August 2000 (aged 18)	16	0	(United States Soccer Federation) Texas Longhorns
8	DF	Jayde Riviere	22 January 2001 (aged 18)	5	0	(Canadian Soccer Association) Vancouver Whitecaps
9	FW	Jordyn Huitema	8 May 2001 (aged 18)	21	6	(Canadian Soccer Association) Vancouver Whitecaps
10	DF	Ashley Lawrence	11 June 1995 (aged 23)	76	5	(French Football Federation) Paris Saint-Germain
11	MF	Desiree Scott	31 July 1987 (aged 31)	143	0	(United States Soccer Federation) Utah Royals
12	FW	Christine Sinclair (captain)	12 June 1983 (aged 35)	282	181	(United States Soccer Federation) Portland Thorns
13	MF	Sophie Schmidt	28 June 1988 (aged 30)	184	19	(United States Soccer Federation) Houston Dash
14	MF	Gabrielle Carle	12 October 1998 (aged 20)	13	1	(United States Soccer Federation) Florida State Seminoles
15	FW	Nichelle Prince	19 February 1995 (aged 24)	50	10	(United States Soccer Federation) Houston Dash
16	FW	Janine Beckie	20 August 1994 (aged 24)	56	25	(The Football Association) Manchester City
17	MF	Jessie Fleming	11 March 1998 (aged 21)	65	8	(United States Soccer Federation) UCLA Bruins
18	GK	Kailen Sheridan	16 July 1995 (aged 23)	7	0	(United States Soccer Federation) Sky Blue FC
19	FW	Adriana Leon	2 October 1992 (aged 26)	57	15	(The Football Association) West Ham United
20	DF	Shannon Woeller	31 January 1990 (aged 29)	20	0	(Swedish Football Association) Eskilstuna United
21	GK	Sabrina D'Angelo	11 May 1993 (aged 26)	6	0	(Swedish Football Association) Vittsjö
22	DF	Lindsay Agnew	31 March 1995 (aged 24)	11	0	(United States Soccer Federation) Houston Dash
23	DF	Jenna Hellstrom	2 April 1995 (aged 24)	4	0	(Swedish Football Association) KIF Örebro

=== Netherlands ===
Head coach: Sarina Wiegman

The final 23-player squad was announced on 10 April 2019, as well as 7 players being named as a standby list.

No.	Pos.	Player	Date of birth (age)	Caps	Goals	Club
1	GK	Sari van Veenendaal (captain)	3 April 1990 (aged 29)	53	0	(The Football Association) Arsenal
2	DF	Desiree van Lunteren	30 December 1992 (aged 26)	71	0	(German Football Association) SC Freiburg
3	DF	Stefanie van der Gragt	16 August 1992 (aged 26)	56	7	(Royal Spanish Football Federation) Barcelona
4	DF	Merel van Dongen	11 February 1993 (aged 26)	27	1	(Royal Spanish Football Federation) Real Betis
5	DF	Kika van Es	11 October 1991 (aged 27)	58	0	(Royal Dutch Football Association) Ajax
6	DF	Anouk Dekker	15 November 1986 (aged 32)	77	6	(French Football Federation) Montpellier
7	FW	Shanice van de Sanden	2 October 1992 (aged 26)	64	17	(French Football Federation) Lyon
8	MF	Sherida Spitse	29 May 1990 (aged 29)	162	30	(Norwegian Football Federation) Vålerenga
9	FW	Vivianne Miedema	15 July 1996 (aged 22)	75	58	(The Football Association) Arsenal
10	MF	Daniëlle van de Donk	5 August 1991 (aged 27)	89	16	(The Football Association) Arsenal
11	FW	Lieke Martens	16 December 1992 (aged 26)	103	42	(Royal Spanish Football Federation) Barcelona
12	MF	Victoria Pelova	3 June 1999 (aged 20)	3	0	(Royal Dutch Football Association) ADO Den Haag
13	FW	Renate Jansen	7 December 1990 (aged 28)	36	3	(Royal Dutch Football Association) Twente
14	MF	Jackie Groenen	17 December 1994 (aged 24)	46	2	(German Football Association) 1. FFC Frankfurt
15	MF	Inessa Kaagman	17 April 1996 (aged 23)	2	0	(The Football Association) Everton
16	GK	Lize Kop	17 March 1998 (aged 21)	1	0	(Royal Dutch Football Association) Ajax
17	FW	Ellen Jansen	6 October 1992 (aged 26)	14	1	(Royal Dutch Football Association) Ajax
18	DF	Danique Kerkdijk	1 May 1996 (aged 23)	19	0	(The Football Association) Bristol City
19	MF	Jill Roord	22 April 1997 (aged 22)	41	3	(German Football Association) Bayern Munich
20	DF	Dominique Bloodworth	17 January 1995 (aged 24)	47	0	(The Football Association) Arsenal
21	FW	Lineth Beerensteyn	11 October 1996 (aged 22)	40	9	(German Football Association) Bayern Munich
22	DF	Liza van der Most	8 October 1993 (aged 25)	13	0	(Royal Dutch Football Association) Ajax
23	GK	Loes Geurts	12 January 1986 (aged 33)	123	0	(Swedish Football Association) Kopparbergs/Göteborg

=== New Zealand ===
Head coach: (Scotland) Tom Sermanni

The final 23-player squad was announced on 29 April 2019. Meikayla Moore was ruled out due to a ruptured Achilles and replaced by Nicole Stratford on 9 June 2019.

No.	Pos.	Player	Date of birth (age)	Caps	Goals	Club
1	GK	Erin Nayler	17 April 1992 (aged 27)	63	0	(French Football Federation) Bordeaux
2	MF	Ria Percival	7 December 1989 (aged 29)	141	14	(The Football Association) West Ham United
3	DF	Anna Green	20 August 1990 (aged 28)	73	7	(New Zealand Football) Miramar Rangers
4	DF	C. J. Bott	22 April 1995 (aged 24)	17	1	(Swedish Football Association) Vittsjö
5	DF	Nicole Stratford	1 February 1989 (aged 30)	0	0	(New Zealand Football) Glenfield Rovers
6	DF	Rebekah Stott	17 June 1993 (aged 25)	73	4	(Norwegian Football Federation) Avaldsnes
7	DF	Ali Riley (captain)	30 October 1987 (aged 31)	125	1	(The Football Association) Chelsea
8	DF	Abby Erceg	20 November 1989 (aged 29)	137	6	(United States Soccer Federation) North Carolina Courage
9	FW	Emma Kete	1 September 1987 (aged 31)	51	3	Unattached
10	MF	Annalie Longo	1 July 1991 (aged 27)	115	15	Unattached
11	FW	Sarah Gregorius	6 August 1987 (aged 31)	93	34	(New Zealand Football) Miramar Rangers
12	MF	Betsy Hassett	4 August 1990 (aged 28)	113	13	(Football Association of Iceland) KR Reykjavik
13	MF	Rosie White	6 June 1993 (aged 26)	101	24	Unattached
14	MF	Katie Bowen	15 April 1994 (aged 25)	61	3	(United States Soccer Federation) Utah Royals
15	DF	Sarah Morton	28 August 1998 (aged 20)	6	1	(New Zealand Football) Western Springs
16	MF	Katie Duncan	1 February 1988 (aged 31)	122	1	(New Zealand Football) Onehunga Sports
17	FW	Hannah Wilkinson	28 May 1992 (aged 27)	89	25	Unattached
18	DF	Stephanie Skilton	27 October 1994 (aged 24)	9	0	(New Zealand Football) Papakura City
19	FW	Paige Satchell	13 April 1998 (aged 21)	13	1	(New Zealand Football) Three Kings United
20	MF	Daisy Cleverley	30 April 1997 (aged 22)	8	2	(United States Soccer Federation) California Golden Bears
21	GK	Victoria Esson	6 March 1991 (aged 28)	3	0	(Norwegian Football Federation) Avaldsnes
22	MF	Olivia Chance	5 October 1993 (aged 25)	13	0	(The Football Association) Everton
23	GK	Nadia Olla	7 February 2000 (aged 19)	1	0	(New Zealand Football) Western Springs

== Group F ==
=== Chile ===
Head coach: José Letelier

The 23-player squad was announced on 19 May 2019. Fernanda Pinilla replaced injured Ana Gutiérrez.

No.	Pos.	Player	Date of birth (age)	Caps	Goals	Club
1	GK	Christiane Endler (captain)	23 July 1991 (aged 27)	21	0	(French Football Federation) Paris Saint-Germain
2	DF	Rocío Soto	21 September 1993 (aged 25)	13	2	(Royal Spanish Football Federation) Zaragoza
3	DF	Carla Guerrero	23 December 1987 (aged 31)	15	4	(Royal Spanish Football Federation) Rayo Vallecano
4	MF	Francisca Lara	29 July 1990 (aged 28)	23	9	(Royal Spanish Football Federation) Sevilla
5	DF	Valentina Díaz	30 March 2001 (aged 18)	2	0	(Football Federation of Chile) Colo-Colo
6	MF	Claudia Soto	6 July 1993 (aged 25)	15	0	(Brazilian Football Confederation) Santos
7	FW	María José Rojas	17 December 1987 (aged 31)	21	12	(Football Association of the Czech Republic) Slavia Praha
8	MF	Karen Araya	16 October 1990 (aged 28)	21	6	(Royal Spanish Football Federation) Sevilla
9	FW	María José Urrutia	17 December 1993 (aged 25)	7	0	(Brazilian Football Confederation) 3B da Amazônia
10	FW	Yanara Aedo	5 August 1993 (aged 25)	20	9	(Royal Spanish Football Federation) Valencia
11	MF	Yessenia López	20 October 1990 (aged 28)	21	3	(Royal Spanish Football Federation) Sporting Huelva
12	GK	Natalia Campos	12 January 1992 (aged 27)	3	0	(Football Federation of Chile) Universidad Católica
13	FW	Javiera Grez	11 July 2000 (aged 18)	9	1	(Football Federation of Chile) Curicó Unido
14	MF	Daniela Pardo	5 September 1988 (aged 30)	5	0	(Football Federation of Chile) Santiago Morning
15	DF	Su Helen Galaz	27 May 1991 (aged 28)	11	0	(Royal Spanish Football Federation) Zaragoza
16	DF	Fernanda Pinilla	6 November 1993 (aged 25)	16	0	(Royal Spanish Football Federation) Córdoba
17	DF	Javiera Toro	22 April 1998 (aged 21)	3	0	(Football Federation of Chile) Santiago Morning
18	DF	Camila Sáez	17 October 1994 (aged 24)	21	3	(Royal Spanish Football Federation) Rayo Vallecano
19	FW	Yessenia Huenteo	30 October 1992 (aged 26)	16	1	(Royal Spanish Football Federation) Cáceres
20	FW	Daniela Zamora	13 November 1990 (aged 28)	11	0	(Football Federation of Chile) Universidad de Chile
21	FW	Rosario Balmaceda	23 March 1999 (aged 20)	4	0	(Football Federation of Chile) Colo-Colo
22	MF	Elisa Durán	16 January 2002 (aged 17)	0	0	(Football Federation of Chile) Colo-Colo
23	GK	Ryann Torrero	1 September 1990 (aged 28)	0	0	Unattached

=== Sweden ===
Head coach: Peter Gerhardsson

The final 23-player squad was announced on 16 May 2019.

No.	Pos.	Player	Date of birth (age)	Caps	Goals	Club
1	GK	Hedvig Lindahl	29 April 1983 (aged 36)	158	0	(The Football Association) Chelsea
2	DF	Jonna Andersson	2 January 1993 (aged 26)	41	0	(The Football Association) Chelsea
3	DF	Linda Sembrant	15 May 1987 (aged 32)	110	8	(French Football Federation) Montpellier
4	DF	Hanna Glas	16 April 1993 (aged 26)	22	0	(French Football Federation) Paris Saint-Germain
5	DF	Nilla Fischer	2 August 1984 (aged 34)	176	23	(German Football Association) VfL Wolfsburg
6	DF	Magdalena Eriksson	8 September 1993 (aged 25)	49	5	(The Football Association) Chelsea
7	FW	Madelen Janogy	12 November 1995 (aged 23)	4	1	(Swedish Football Association) Piteå
8	FW	Lina Hurtig	15 September 1995 (aged 23)	18	3	(Swedish Football Association) Linköping
9	FW	Kosovare Asllani	29 July 1989 (aged 29)	127	32	(Swedish Football Association) Linköping
10	FW	Sofia Jakobsson	23 April 1990 (aged 29)	101	17	(French Football Federation) Montpellier
11	FW	Stina Blackstenius	5 February 1996 (aged 23)	44	10	(Swedish Football Association) Linköping
12	GK	Jennifer Falk	26 April 1993 (aged 26)	0	0	(Swedish Football Association) Kopparbergs/Göteborg
13	DF	Amanda Ilestedt	17 January 1993 (aged 26)	26	2	(German Football Association) Turbine Potsdam
14	MF	Julia Roddar	16 February 1992 (aged 27)	6	0	(Swedish Football Association) Kopparbergs/Göteborg
15	DF	Nathalie Björn	4 May 1997 (aged 22)	9	2	(Swedish Football Association) Rosengård
16	FW	Julia Zigiotti Olme	24 December 1997 (aged 21)	7	0	(Swedish Football Association) Kopparbergs/Göteborg
17	MF	Caroline Seger (captain)	19 March 1985 (aged 34)	193	27	(Swedish Football Association) Rosengård
18	FW	Fridolina Rolfö	24 November 1993 (aged 25)	35	8	(German Football Association) Bayern Munich
19	FW	Anna Anvegård	10 May 1997 (aged 22)	9	1	(Swedish Football Association) Växjö
20	FW	Mimmi Larsson	9 April 1994 (aged 25)	20	6	(Swedish Football Association) Linköping
21	GK	Zećira Mušović	26 May 1996 (aged 23)	2	0	(Swedish Football Association) Rosengård
22	MF	Olivia Schough	11 March 1991 (aged 28)	72	9	(Swedish Football Association) Djurgården
23	MF	Elin Rubensson	11 May 1993 (aged 26)	63	2	(Swedish Football Association) Kopparbergs/Göteborg

=== Thailand ===
Head coach: Nuengrutai Srathongvian

A 25-player provisional squad was revealed on 16 May 2019. This was later reduced to the final 23-player list.

No.	Pos.	Player	Date of birth (age)	Caps	Goals	Club
1	GK	Waraporn Boonsing	16 February 1990 (aged 29)			(Football Association of Thailand) Bundit Asia
2	DF	Kanjanaporn Saenkhun	18 July 1996 (aged 22)			(Football Association of Thailand) Bundit Asia
3	DF	Natthakarn Chinwong	15 March 1992 (aged 27)			(Football Association of Thailand) Bundit Asia
4	DF	Duangnapa Sritala (captain)	4 February 1986 (aged 33)			(Football Association of Thailand) Bangkok
5	DF	Ainon Phancha	26 January 1992 (aged 27)			(Football Association of Thailand) Chonburi Sriprathum
6	MF	Pikul Khueanpet	20 September 1988 (aged 30)			(Football Association of Thailand) Bundit Asia
7	MF	Silawan Intamee	22 January 1994 (aged 25)			(Football Association of Thailand) Chonburi Sriprathum
8	FW	Miranda Nild	1 April 1997 (aged 22)			(United States Soccer Federation) California Golden Bears
9	DF	Warunee Phetwiset	13 December 1990 (aged 28)			(Football Association of Thailand) Chonburi Sriprathum
10	DF	Sunisa Srangthaisong	6 May 1988 (aged 31)			(Football Association of Thailand) Bundit Asia
11	MF	Sudarat Chuchuen	19 June 1997 (aged 21)			(Football Association of Thailand) Sisaket
12	MF	Rattikan Thongsombut	7 July 1991 (aged 27)			(Football Association of Thailand) Bundit Asia
13	FW	Orathai Srimanee	12 June 1988 (aged 30)			(Football Association of Thailand) Bundit Asia
14	FW	Saowalak Pengngam	30 November 1996 (aged 22)			(Football Association of Thailand) Chonburi Sriprathum
15	MF	Orapin Waenngoen	7 October 1995 (aged 23)			(Football Association of Thailand) Bundit Asia
16	DF	Khwanrudi Saengchan	16 May 1991 (aged 28)			(Football Association of Thailand) Bundit Asia
17	FW	Taneekarn Dangda	15 December 1992 (aged 26)			(Football Association of Thailand) Bangkok
18	GK	Sukanya Chor Charoenying	24 November 1987 (aged 31)			(Football Association of Thailand) Air Force United
19	DF	Pitsamai Sornsai	19 January 1989 (aged 30)			(Football Association of Thailand) Chonburi Sriprathum
20	MF	Wilaiporn Boothduang	25 June 1987 (aged 31)			(Football Association of Thailand) Bangkok
21	MF	Kanjana Sungngoen	21 September 1986 (aged 32)			(Football Association of Thailand) Bangkok
22	GK	Tiffany Sornpao	22 May 1998 (aged 21)			(United States Soccer Federation) Kennesaw State Owls
23	DF	Phornphirun Philawan	8 April 1999 (aged 20)			(Football Association of Thailand) Bundit Asia

=== United States ===
Head coach: Jill Ellis

The final 23-player squad was announced on 1 May 2019. Instead of naming one player as captain, the United States named Carli Lloyd, Alex Morgan, and Megan Rapinoe as co-captains.

No.	Pos.	Player	Date of birth (age)	Caps	Goals	Club
1	GK	Alyssa Naeher	20 April 1988 (aged 31)	43	0	(United States Soccer Federation) Chicago Red Stars
2	FW	Mallory Pugh	29 April 1998 (aged 21)	50	15	(United States Soccer Federation) Washington Spirit
3	MF	Sam Mewis	9 October 1992 (aged 26)	47	9	(United States Soccer Federation) North Carolina Courage
4	DF	Becky Sauerbrunn	6 June 1985 (aged 34)	155	0	(United States Soccer Federation) Utah Royals
5	DF	Kelley O'Hara	4 August 1988 (aged 30)	115	2	(United States Soccer Federation) Utah Royals
6	MF	Morgan Brian	26 February 1993 (aged 26)	82	6	(United States Soccer Federation) Chicago Red Stars
7	DF	Abby Dahlkemper	13 May 1993 (aged 26)	37	0	(United States Soccer Federation) North Carolina Courage
8	MF	Julie Ertz	6 April 1992 (aged 27)	79	18	(United States Soccer Federation) Chicago Red Stars
9	MF	Lindsey Horan	26 May 1994 (aged 25)	66	8	(United States Soccer Federation) Portland Thorns
10	FW	Carli Lloyd (co-captain)	16 July 1982 (aged 36)	271	107	(United States Soccer Federation) Sky Blue FC
11	DF	Ali Krieger	28 July 1984 (aged 34)	99	1	(United States Soccer Federation) Orlando Pride
12	DF	Tierna Davidson	19 September 1998 (aged 20)	19	1	(United States Soccer Federation) Chicago Red Stars
13	FW	Alex Morgan (co-captain)	2 July 1989 (aged 29)	160	101	(United States Soccer Federation) Orlando Pride
14	DF	Emily Sonnett	25 November 1993 (aged 25)	31	0	(United States Soccer Federation) Portland Thorns
15	FW	Megan Rapinoe (co-captain)	5 July 1985 (aged 33)	150	44	(United States Soccer Federation) Reign FC
16	MF	Rose Lavelle	14 May 1995 (aged 24)	24	6	(United States Soccer Federation) Washington Spirit
17	FW	Tobin Heath	29 May 1988 (aged 31)	147	28	(United States Soccer Federation) Portland Thorns
18	GK	Ashlyn Harris	19 October 1985 (aged 33)	21	0	(United States Soccer Federation) Orlando Pride
19	DF	Crystal Dunn	3 July 1992 (aged 26)	83	24	(United States Soccer Federation) North Carolina Courage
20	MF	Allie Long	13 August 1987 (aged 31)	42	6	(United States Soccer Federation) Reign FC
21	GK	Adrianna Franch	12 November 1990 (aged 28)	1	0	(United States Soccer Federation) Portland Thorns
22	FW	Jessica McDonald	28 February 1988 (aged 31)	7	2	(United States Soccer Federation) North Carolina Courage
23	FW	Christen Press	29 December 1988 (aged 30)	113	47	(United States Soccer Federation) Utah Royals

== Statistics ==
=== Player representation by league system ===
League systems with 25 or more players represented are listed.

Country	Players	Outside national squad
United States	73	48
Spain	52	32
France	51	31
England	49	31
Germany	33	12
Sweden	32	18
Norway	28	12
Italy	27	5
China	27	5

- The United States squad is made up entirely of players from the country's domestic league.
- The Jamaica squad is made up entirely of players employed by overseas clubs. It is also the only one of the participants' leagues that did not send any players to the tournament.

=== Player representation by club ===
Clubs with 10 or more players represented are listed.

Club	Players
(Spain) Barcelona	15
(France) Lyon	14
(England) Chelsea	12
(England) Manchester City	12
(South Korea) Hyundai Steel Red Angels	11
(Germany) Bayern Munich	10
(Japan) Nippon TV Beleza	10
(Thailand) Bundit Asia	10
(France) Paris Saint-Germain	10

=== Average age of squads ===
Nation	Avg. Age	Oldest player	Youngest player
France	26.3	Élise Bussaglia (33 years and 257 days)	Emelyne Laurent (20 years and 216 days)
Nigeria	25.4	Onome Ebi (36 years and 31 days )	Chiamaka Nnadozie (18 years and 182 days)
Norway	25.3	Ingrid Hjelmseth (39 years and 59 days)	Frida Maanum (19 years and 327 days)
South Korea	26.7	Hwang Bo-ram (31 years and 245 days)	Kang Chae-rim (21 years and 77 days)
China	25.9	Zhang Rui (30 years and 143 days)	Xu Huan (20 years and 95 days)
Germany	25.4	Lena Goeßling (33 years and 93 days)	Lena Oberdorf (17 years and 172 days)
South Africa	25.5	Noko Matlou (33 years and 251 days)	Karabo Dhlamini (17 years and 263 days)
Spain	24.7	Silvia Meseguer (30 years and 88 days)	Lucía García (20 years and 329 days)
Australia	25.3	Lisa De Vanna (34 years and 206 days)	Mary Fowler (16 years and 115 days)
Brazil	27.5	Formiga (41 years and 98 days)	Geyse Ferreira (21 years and 74 days)
Italy	27.3	Chiara Marchitelli (34 years and 36 days)	Annamaria Serturini (21 years and 27 days)
Jamaica	23	Nicole McClure (29 years and 204 days)	Jody Brown (17 years and 54 days)
Argentina	26.7	Mariela Coronel (37 years and 353 days)	Dalila Ippólito (17 years and 77 days)
England	27.1	Karen Bardsley (34 years 237 days)	Georgia Stanway (20 years and 157 days)
Japan	24	Aya Sameshima (31 years and 358 days)	Jun Endo (19 years and 16 days)
Scotland	26.9	Shannon Lynn (33 years and 230 days)	Erin Cuthbert (20 years and 325 days)
Cameroon	27.3	Madeleine Ngono Mani (35 years and 236 days)	Alexandra Takounda (18 years and 335 days)
Canada	24.7	Christine Sinclair (35 years and 360 days)	Jordyn Huitema (18 years and 30 days)
Netherlands	25.5	Loes Geurts (33 years and 146 days)	Victoria Pelova (20 years and 4 days)
New Zealand	26.4	Sarah Gregorius (31 years and 305 days)	Nadia Olla (19 years and 120 days)
Chile	25.3	María José Rojas (31 years and 172 days)	Elisa Durán (17 years and 142 days)
Sweden	26.6	Hedvig Lindahl (36 years and 39 days)	Julia Zigiotti Olme (21 years and 165 days)
Thailand	26.8	Duangnapa Sritala (33 years and 123 days)	Phornphirun Philawan (20 years and 60 days)
United States	28.6	Carli Lloyd (36 years and 326 days)	Tierna Davidson (20 years and 262 days)
