= Hue Menzies =

Jamaican football player and manager (born 1964)

Personal information
- Full name: Hue Alphanso Menzies
- Date of birth: 10 March 1964 (age 62)
- Place of birth: London, England
- Position: Defender

Team information
- Current team: US Club Soccer (Board member)

College career
Years	Team	Apps	(Gls)
1982–1985	Hardin–Simmons Cowboys		

Senior career*
Years	Team	Apps	(Gls)
- Orlando Lions
- Houston Dynamos

Managerial career
- 1993–1997: Abilene Eagles
- Texas Longhorns Women (assistant)
- 2015–2019: Jamaica Women
- 2022: NJ/NY Gotham FC (interim)
- * Club domestic league appearances and goals

Hue Alphanso Menzies (born 10 March 1964) is a football manager and former player. Menzies is most well known for leading the Jamaica women's national team to the 2019 FIFA Women's World Cup as its head coach and technical director, which was the first time a Caribbean nation had qualified for the FIFA Women's World Cup.

In August 2022, Menzies was appointed as the interim head coach of National Women's Soccer League club NJ/NY Gotham FC for the remainder of the 2022 season, making him the first Black head coach in NWSL history. In addition to his international and professional coaching career, he serves as a board member for US Club Soccer and the executive director of the Florida Kraze Krush youth development club.

Menzies was inducted into the United States Black Coaches Soccer Hall of Fame in 2023, followed by his induction into the Hardin–Simmons University Athletics Hall of Fame in 2024.

== Playing career ==
Menzies played primarily as a defender during his career. During college, he played for the Hardin–Simmons Cowboys soccer team from 1982 to 1985.

For two seasons during the mid-1980s, Menzies played professionally for the Orlando Lions of the American Soccer League, as well as the Houston Dynamos.

== Managerial career ==
=== Career in the United States ===
In 1983, while a sophomore in college, Menzies first began coaching in order to earn extra money. Later while working in investment banking in New York, Menzies coached local youth soccer.

Menzies left the finance industry to return to coaching full-time. From 1993 to 1997, he coached the boys' soccer team at Abilene High School, where he taught, and also coached cross country and trained the placekickers of the American football team. He also worked as the assistant coach of the Longhorns women's soccer team at the University of Texas at Austin for two years. Menzies became involved in coaching for the U.S. Olympic Development Program (ODP) at the national, state and regional levels. After 15 years of experience, he also served as an ODP coaching instructor. He has also worked as an assistant coach for the United States women's national under-19 team, including at the 2004 FIFA U-19 Women's World Championship in Thailand.

After coaching and later serving as the director of Warriors Soccer Club in Austin, Texas for five years, in 2004 Menzies helped start Lone Star Soccer Club in Austin, where he serves as a director. The club had 5,000 players enrolled by the time he left for Florida. In 2008, he joined as the director of coaching of youth club Central Florida United (later Central Florida Kraze). Following mergers, he has served as the executive director of Elite Clubs National League club Florida Kraze Krush since its founding in 2012, which is based outside of Orlando and has assisted in placing more than 400 of its players into U.S. colleges.

Menzies holds a U.S. Soccer national "A" coaching licence, as well as a national youth coaching licence.

=== Jamaica women's national team ===
In early 2015, Menzies was appointed as the head coach and technical director of the Jamaica women's national team, following the team's failed qualification attempt for the 2015 FIFA Women's World Cup. He decided to help develop the women's programme as an advisor after being approached by Cedella Marley, the daughter of the late reggae musician Bob Marley. She acts as a benefactor and ambassador for women's football in Jamaica, helping to develop and fund the team through the Bob Marley Foundation and various fundraisers. Menzies joined the women's programme as a volunteer, as the Jamaica Football Federation (JFF) had nothing designated for the women's team head coach in the budget. Prior to joining, the country's senior and youth women's teams had never before qualified to a major international tournament. He first led the team in November 2015 for two matches of CONCACAF Olympic qualifying. Jamaica lost the semi-final 1–2 against hosts Trinidad and Tobago, before again losing 1–2 in the third place play-off against Guyana, which saw Jamaica fail to advance to the next round. Shortly afterwards, the national team was disbanded for two years.

He was not contacted again by the Jamaica Football Federation until February 2018, when he was asked to prepare a squad for the first round of CONCACAF Women's Championship qualification in Haiti, which was part of World Cup qualifying. Jamaica won their first two matches against Guadeloupe (13–0) and Martinique (3–0), before drawing 2–2 against hosts Haiti, therefore finishing first in the group on goal difference and advancing to the next round. In the final round of CONCACAF Women's Championship qualifying, hosts Jamaica won all four matches against Antigua and Barbuda (9–0), Bermuda (4–0), Trinidad and Tobago (4–1) and Cuba (6–1) to qualify for the 2018 CONCACAF Women's Championship. In 2018, prior to the Women's Championship, Jamaica also competed in the Central American and Caribbean Games, where they finished third in their group and were eliminated with a record of one win and two losses.

At the 2018 CONCACAF Women's Championship, which would determine the three CONCACAF teams which would qualify for the 2019 FIFA Women's World Cup, the Reggae Girlz were drawn into Group B alongside Canada, Costa Rica and Cuba. In their first match against Canada, they played well but lost 0–2. Jamaica secured an upset 1–0 victory over Costa Rica in their second match, thanks in part to the great play of goalkeeper Sydney Schneider. In their final group match against Cuba, Jamaica won 9–0. As a result of Costa Rica losing their final group match, Jamaica finished second in their group and advanced to the semi-finals, where they faced the United States, who were first in the FIFA Women's World Rankings. Jamaica lost the match 0–6, but advanced to the third place play-off against Panama, with the winner qualifying for the Women's World Cup (while the losers would advance to the intercontinental play-offs). Jamaica took the lead in the 14th minute via Khadija Shaw, with Panama equalising in the 75th minute to send the match to extra time. Jamaica again took the lead through Jody Brown, though Panama again equalised with five minutes remaining, sending the match to a penalty shoot-out. Goalkeeper Nicole McClure, who Menzies brought on for the shoot-out in the last minute, saved two shots to help Jamaica to a 4–2 win on penalties, thus qualifying for the FIFA Women's World Cup in France. The shock qualification saw Jamaica become the first Caribbean nation to compete at the Women's World Cup. Following Jamaica's success, Menzies was named as the 2018 women's football coach of the year by CONCACAF.

Menzies has worked to improve the level of women's football in Jamaica, stating "You can't develop players in camp. I had to really educate the federation of this. They assume we can do an average league in Jamaica and come down and do camps, and it will be okay. That's not how you develop players for your national team. The outside resources, as far as club and colleges, are very important in their development. Some of the players were out of school, working or in the WPSL, but we had to get them attached to clubs in Europe. That triggered things with me and I [had to] start sending these kids out to different parts of the world—they are playing games, training every day, competing; it's a different culture, they have to fend for themselves and be more independent and receptive to learning."

In the World Cup, Jamaica were drawn into Group C alongside Australia, Brazil and Italy. Weeks prior to the tournament, the women's team players were able to sign a contract with the federation for the first time, giving them a monthly salary of US$800 to $1,200 (retroactive from January 2019). Additionally, Menzies is to receive $40,000, after having worked for free since he joined in 2015. However, the team were still raising money weeks ahead of the tournament to fund expenses due to the limited budget provided by the JFF.

Menzies resigned from the role as manager of the Jamaica national team in December 2019, citing the financial problems and federation mismanagement.

Team	From	To	Record								
Team	From	To	M	W	D	L	GF	GA	GD	Win %	Ref.
Jamaica women	2015	Present	25	10	1	14	37	55	-18	40	

=== NJ/NY Gotham FC ===
Following the firing of Scott Parkinson, Menzies was appointed interim head coach of NJ/NY Gotham FC of the National Women's Soccer League on 13 August 2022.

== Personal life ==
Menzies was born in the London district of Brixton, England. After his parents divorced, he moved with his family in 1968 at the age of four to Jamaica, his mother's homeland, where he was raised. He attended Alpha Primary School and Priory High, before moving to the United States at the age of 16 in 1980. Later, he was able to get a college scholarship to attend Hardin–Simmons University in Abilene, Texas. After his playing career, Menzies went back to school at New York University where he earned his MBA, and later worked as an analyst in investment banking at Merrill Lynch in New York City for six years. He later worked as an algebra teacher at Abilene High School in Texas.

Menzies is currently based in Orlando, Florida, and holds American citizenship.

== Honours ==
=== Manager ===
Jamaica Women

- CONCACAF Women's Championship third place: 2018

Individual

- CONCACAF Women's Football Coach of the Year: 2018

=== Inductions ===
- United States Black Coaches Soccer Hall of Fame: 2023
- Hardin–Simmons University Athletics Hall of Fame: 2024
