= Henry Fowler (educator) =

Henry Richmond Harold Fowler C.D., M.A. (12 May 1915 – 14 February 2007) was a Jamaican educator, politician and cultural leader.

== Early life ==
Henry Fowler's parents were Horace and Agnes Fowler, white planters from Moneague in central Jamaica.

Henry was educated at Jamaica College in Kingston. An academic achiever, he went on to Worcester College, Oxford University in 1935, as a Rhodes scholar.

== Educationalist ==
Fowler became one of Jamaica's leading educationalists. He started his teaching career at Wolmer's Boys School in Kingston, specialising in English literature.

In 1942, Henry Fowler opened his eponymous private school in Kingston, and then in 1944, launched the Priory School, remaining as headmaster until his retirement in 1973.

He was appointed as Visiting Professor (Comparative Education) Western Carolina University in 1982, and President of the Inter-Regional Centre for Curriculum Development from 1985 to 1990.

He continued as a distinguished advisor on education, serving as Chairman of Jamaica Ministry of Education's Committee for preparation of Youth for Independence and Chairman of the National Council on Libraries, Archives and Documentation Services. He was a Visiting Senior Associate at Queen Elizabeth House, University of Oxford and was a member of the Council of the University of the West Indies.

== Politics and diplomacy ==
Fowler became active in politics at Oxford, where he was chairman of the Oxford University Labour Club. A supporter of the League of Nations, he took part in international student delegations, including the Brussels International Peace Conference in 1936; the British delegation led by Lord Robert Cecil to the World Students Conference in Paris in 1937; and the 1937 British universities mission to Prague.

At the outbreak of World War II, Fowler returned to Jamaica, where he joined Norman Manley's People's National Party (PNP) and, from 1939 to 1943, edited Public Opinion, a publication with ties to the PNP.

== Cultural role ==
Fowler had a lifelong interest in theatre. He was active in the Oxford University Dramatic Society (OUDS) as a student.

He founded the Little Theatre Movement (LTM) in Kingston in 1941 with his first wife, Greta Bourke. Together they set up the Jamaica Theatre School, now the Edna Manley College of the Visual and Performing Arts and the Ward Theatre Foundation. The Fowlers were friends of Noël Coward.

Fowler served as Chairman of the All-Island Art Exhibition Committee and Vice-Chairman of the Caribbean Arts Festival.

He became founder Chairman of the Board of the Jamaica Broadcasting Corporation and also served as Jamaica's appointed ambassador to Unesco.

== Family and personal life ==
Fowler married twice:

- firstly to Greta Bourke (née Todd) M.B.E. (d.1978) who ran the Little Theatre Movement (LTM) in Kingston. Greta had previously been married to the Jamaican lawyer Alfred Wellesley Bourke. Their daughter Jennifer Bourke married the actor Robert Shaw.
- secondly to Beryl Chitty CMG (m.1989, d. 2009) the former deputy British High Commissioner of Jamaica and a graduate of St Hugh's College, Oxford.

He died on St Valentine's Day, 14 February 2007. His life was celebrated with a memorial service at St Hugh's College, Oxford.
