= Marthe Ongmahan =

Cameroonian footballer

Personal information
- Full name: Marthe Yolande Ongmahan
- Date of birth: 12 June 1992 (age 34)
- Place of birth: Cameroon
- Height: 1.67 m (5 ft 6 in)
- Position: Goalkeeper

Team information
- Current team: Lekié FF
- Number: 20

Senior career*
Years	Team	Apps	(Gls)
2022-2024	AWA Yaoundé		
2024-	Lekié FF		

International career^{‡}
- Cameroon
- * Club domestic league appearances and goals as of 07:33, 28 December 2019 (UTC) ‡ National team caps and goals as of 07:33, 28 December 2019 (UTC)

Marthe Yolande Ongmahan (born 12 June 1992) is a Cameroonian footballer who plays as a goalkeeper for Lekié FF and the Cameroon women's national team.

== Career ==
Ongmahan plays club football for AWA Yaoundé in Yaoundé, where she won the Cameroonian women's league title in 2017.

Ongmahan was included in Cameroon's squad for the 2018 Africa Women Cup of Nations in Ghana, though she did not appear in the tournament. The team ultimately won the third place play-off 4–2 against Mali, thus qualifying for the 2019 FIFA Women's World Cup in France. Therefore, the following year she was included in Cameroon's squad for the Women's World Cup. She again did not appear in the tournament, which saw Cameroon reach the round of 16 before losing 3–0 to England.
