= Elisa Durán =

Chilean footballer (born 2002)

Personal information
- Full name: Elisa Antonia Durán Barrera
- Date of birth: 16 January 2002 (age 24)
- Place of birth: Calama, Chile
- Height: 1.68 m (5 ft 6 in)
- Position: Midfielder

Team information
- Current team: Huachipato (on loan from Colo-Colo)

Youth career
- 2013–2019: Colo-Colo

Senior career*
Years	Team	Apps	(Gls)
2018–	Colo-Colo		
2026–	→ Huachipato (loan)		

International career^{‡}
2018	Chile U17		
2019	Chile	0	(0)
2020–2022	Chile U20	9	(0)
- * Club domestic league appearances and goals as of 6 October 2019 ‡ National team caps and goals as of 30 August 2023

Elisa Antonia Durán Barrera (born 16 January 2002) is a Chilean footballer who plays as a midfielder for Huachipato on loan from Colo-Colo.

== Club career ==
Durán played for Colo-Colo U-17 team in 2017 and 2018, winning the championship in both seasons.

In 2019, Durán graduated to Colo-Colo's first team, debuting at the Chilean women's football championship. During the season, Durán scored a goal on her team's victory against rivals Universidad de Chile.

Durán left Colo-Colo after 13 years at the end of the 2025 season and moved on loan to Huachipato.

== International career ==
Durán was part of the Chile's U-17 squad that competed at the 2018 South American U-17 Women's Championship.

In 2019, Durán was selected as part of the team that competed at the 2019 FIFA Women's World Cup held in France, being the youngest player of the squad. She did not play at the World Cup.

In both 2020 and 2022, she made appearances for the under-20 team in the South American Championships and the 2022 South American Games.
