= Nadia Olla =

New Zealand footballer

Personal information
- Full name: Nadia Kelly Olla
- Date of birth: 7 February 2000 (age 26)
- Height: 1.69 m (5 ft 7 in)
- Position: Goalkeeper

Team information
- Current team: Western Springs AFC
- Number: 1

Senior career*
Years	Team	Apps	(Gls)
- Western Springs

International career
2018–	New Zealand	1	(0)
- * Club domestic league appearances and goals

Nadia Kelly Olla (born 7 February 2000) is a New Zealand association football goalkeeper, playing for Western Springs AFC. She has represented New Zealand.

== International career ==
In April 2019, Olla was named to the final 23-player squad for the 2019 FIFA Women's World Cup.
