= Priory School (Kingston) =

The Priory School

Location
- 32 Hope Road; Kingston 10; Jamaica; 18.0174006°N 76.7870682°W

Information
- Founded: 1944
- Founder: Henry Fowler

The Priory School in Kingston, Jamaica teaches kindergarten, primary and secondary students, the latter under the name Priory High.

== History ==
It was founded in 1944 as "The Priory House" by Henry Fowler, a Jamaican Rhodes scholar, political activist and patron of the arts and educational causes. Fowler was Priory's headmaster from its founding until his retirement in 1973.

== Campus ==
Priory originally consisted of just one building, a former private residence "The Priory". This had been built in 1907 by the Governor of Jamaica Hugh Clarence Bourne to replace the previous building destroyed in the 1907 Kingston earthquake. This previous building had been in use as a rectory and it was in allusion to this that the name "Priory" was chosen for the new building.

== See also ==
- Education in Jamaica
- List of Schools in Jamaica
