= Nicole McClure =

Jamaican footballer (born 1989)

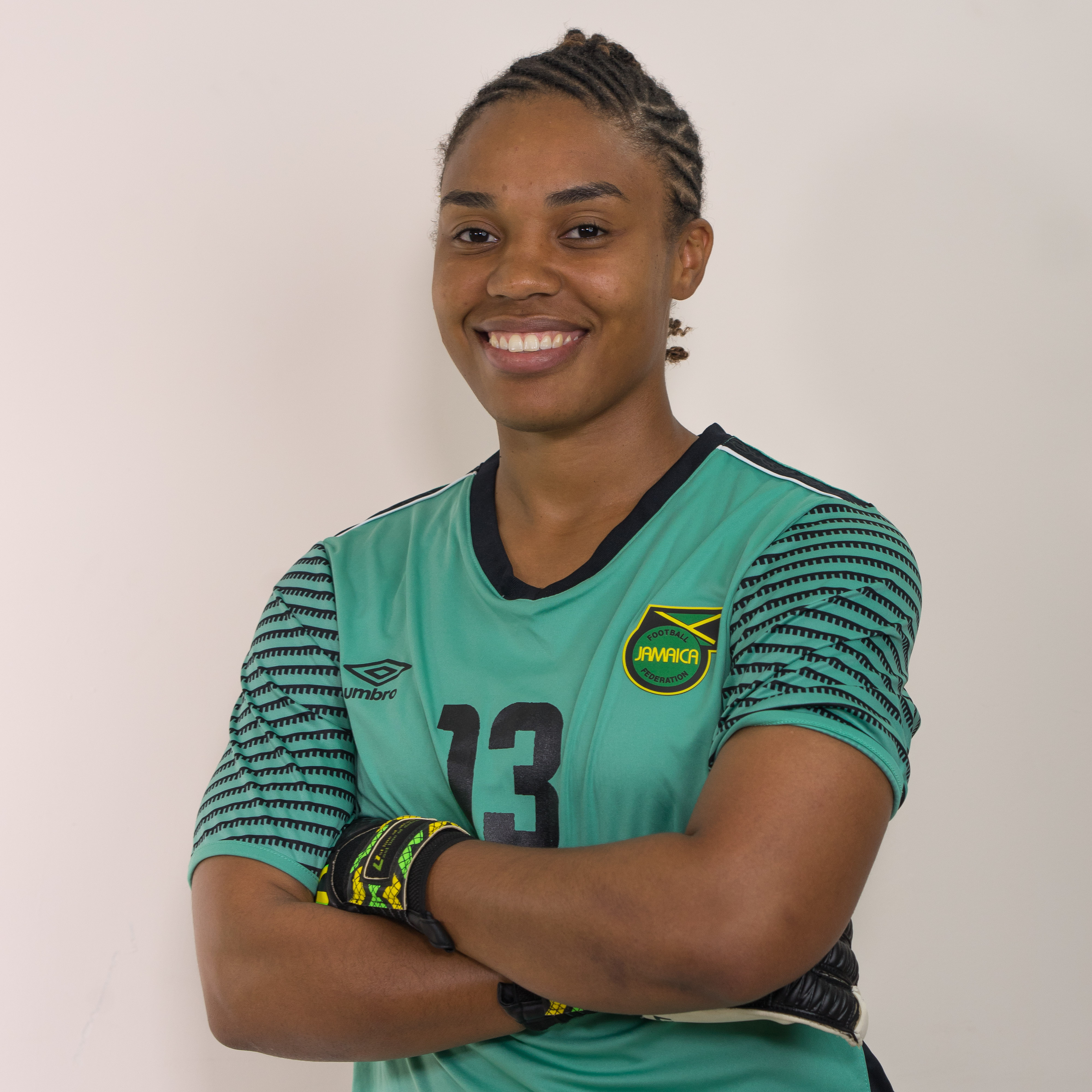

Personal information
- Full name: Nicole Althea McClure
- Date of birth: 16 November 1989 (age 36)
- Place of birth: Jamaica, New York, United States
- Height: 1.72 m (5 ft 8 in)
- Position: Goalkeeper

Youth career
- 2003–2007: East Meadow Shooting Stars
- 2003–2007: Cardozo Judges

College career
Years	Team	Apps	(Gls)
2007–2008	Hawaii Rainbow Wahine	16	(0)
2009–2011	South Florida Bulls	40	(0)

Senior career*
Years	Team	Apps	(Gls)
2010	Tampa Bay Hellenic	7	(0)
2012	Selfoss	16	(0)
2012–2013	FC Neunkirch	3	(0)
2013	HK	15	(0)
2014	Östersunds		
2015	Klepp	0	(0)
2015–2016	F.C. Ramat HaSharon	6	(0)
2016	Osijek	3	(0)
2016–2017	CSFA Ambilly		
2017	ŽNK Split		
2018	Sundsvalls DFF	20	(0)
2019–2020	Sion Swifts WFC	18	(1)

International career^{‡}
2009–	Jamaica	22	(0)
Medal record
Representing Jamaica
CONCACAF W Championship
Third place	2018 United States
- * Club domestic league appearances and goals as of 28 September 2018 ‡ National team caps and goals as of 8 October 2018

Nicole Althea McClure (born 16 November 1989) is an American-born Jamaican footballer who plays as a goalkeeper for the Jamaica women's national team.

== Early life ==
McClure was born in Jamaica, Queens, on the state of New York, United States. Her parents hail from Jamaica, in the Caribbean. She grew up playing in the Long Island Junior Soccer League (LIJSL) for the Auburndale Strikers from 1998 to 2003 and the East Meadow Shooting Stars from 2003 to ’07. With the Shooting Stars, she won the Eastern New York Youth Soccer Association (ENYYSA) Girls-Under-15 State Open Cup final in 2005. Nicole also played for Eastern New York's Olympic Development Program (ODP). (AuburndaleSoccerclub.org)

== College career ==
McClure attended the University of Hawaii at Manoa and the University of South Florida.

== Club career ==
During her college career, McClure played for Tampa Bay Hellenic. After that, she left the United States and played exclusively for clubs in Europe.

== International career ==
McClure made her senior debut for Jamaica in 2009. She was a key player in the first ever Jamaican qualification to a FIFA Women's World Cup (the 2019 edition). Similar to Tim Krul for the Netherlands against Costa Rica in the 2014 FIFA Men's World Cup quarter finals, McClure was brought on by Hue Menzies as a 120th-minute substitute for the penalty shootout against Panama in the 2018 CONCACAF Women's Championship third place play-off. She saved two of the four penalties she faced as Jamaica won 4–2.
