= 2020 South American U-17 Women's Championship =

7th edition of the South American Under-17 Women's Football Championship

CONMEBOL Sub 17 Femenino Uruguay 2020

Tournament details
- Host country: Uruguay
- Dates: Cancelled
- Teams: 10 (from 1 confederation)
- Venue: 2 (in 2 host cities)

The 2020 South American U-17 Women's Championship was originally going be the seventh edition of the South American Under-17 Women's Football Championship (Spanish: CONMEBOL Sudamericano Femenino Sub-17), the biennial international youth football championship organised by CONMEBOL for the women's under-17 national teams of South America. It was scheduled to be held in Uruguay between 15 April and 3 May 2020, before its suspension and subsequent cancellation due to the COVID-19 pandemic.

The tournament was originally to be held in Venezuela from 15 April to 3 May 2020. However, CONMEBOL announced on 9 March 2020 that it would instead be held in Uruguay on the same dates.

CONMEBOL announced on 19 March 2020 that the tournament would be postponed to late August and early September due to the outbreak of COVID-19 pandemic in South America. On 1 June 2020, after FIFA postponed the 2020 FIFA U-17 Women's World Cup until February/March 2021 due to the COVID-19 pandemic, CONMEBOL announced that the tournament would be further postponed to November. On 6 August 2020, CONMEBOL confirmed that the tournament would be played between 30 November – 19 December 2020. On 30 October 2020, CONMEBOL further postponed the tournament to January 2021.

In November 2020 FIFA decided to cancel the 2021 FIFA U-17 Women's World Cup due to health and safety reasons related to the COVID-19 pandemic. Consequently, on 25 November, CONMEBOL announced that the tournament would be held in the second half of 2021 in order to complete the teams preparation cycle. Eventually, CONMEBOL decided to cancel the tournament during a meeting of its council held on 3 August 2021.

As the 2021 FIFA U-17 Women's World Cup was cancelled this tournament would not have served as qualifier for any FIFA U-17 Women's World Cup. Originally the top three teams would have qualified as the CONMEBOL representatives.

Brazil were the defending champions.

== Teams ==
All ten CONMEBOL member national teams were eligible to enter the tournament.

Team	Appearance	Previous best top-4 performance
Argentina	7th	Fourth place (2008, 2012)
Brazil (holders)	6th	Champions (2010, 2012, 2018, 2022)
Chile	7th	Runners-up (2010)
Colombia	7th	Champions (2008)
Ecuador	7th	None
Paraguay	7th	Third place (2008, 2013, 2016)
Peru	7th	None
Uruguay (hosts)	7th	Runners-up (2012)
Venezuela	7th	Champions (2013, 2016)

== Venues ==
The matches were going to be played in two venues in two cities.

- Estadio Charrúa, Montevideo
- Estadio Profesor Alberto Suppici, Colonia del Sacramento

== Draw ==
It is not known how the draw would’ve been done

== Squads ==
Players born on or after 1 January 2003 would’ve eligible to compete in the tournament.

== First stage ==
The top two teams of each group would’ve advanced to the final stage.

All times local, UYT (UTC−3).

=== Group A ===
Pos	Team	Pld	W	D	L	GF	GA	GD	Pts	Qualification
1	A1	0	0	0	0	0	0	0	0	Final stage
2	A2	0	0	0	0	0	0	0	0	Final stage
3	A3	0	0	0	0	0	0	0	0	
4	A4	0	0	0	0	0	0	0	0	
5	A5	0	0	0	0	0	0	0	0	

Updated to match(es) played on unknown. Source: CONMEBOL
Rules for classification: Group stage tiebreakers

v

v

v

v

v

v

v

v

v

v

=== Group B ===
Pos	Team	Pld	W	D	L	GF	GA	GD	Pts	Qualification
1	B1	0	0	0	0	0	0	0	0	Final stage
2	B2	0	0	0	0	0	0	0	0	Final stage
3	B3	0	0	0	0	0	0	0	0	
4	B4	0	0	0	0	0	0	0	0	
5	B5	0	0	0	0	0	0	0	0	

Updated to match(es) played on unknown. Source: CONMEBOL
Rules for classification: Group stage tiebreakers

v

v

v

v

v

>

v

v

v

v

v

== Final stage ==
The top three teams would have qualified for the 2021 FIFA U-17 Women's World Cup.

Pos	Team	Pld	W	D	L	GF	GA	GD	Pts
1	Winner Group A	0	0	0	0	0	0	0	0
2	Runner-up Group A	0	0	0	0	0	0	0	0
3	Winner Group B	0	0	0	0	0	0	0	0
4	Runner-up Group B	0	0	0	0	0	0	0	0

Updated to match(es) played on unknown. Source: CONMEBOL
Rules for classification: Final stage tiebreakers

Winner Group B	v	Runner-up Group A

Winner Group A	v	Runner-up Group B

Winner Group B	v	Runner-up Group B

Winner Group A	v	Runner-up Group A

Runner-up Group A	v	Runner-up Group B

Winner Group A	v	Winner Group B
