= 2026 South American Under-17 Women's Football Championship =

12th edition of the South American Under-20 Women's Football Championship

CONMEBOL Sub 17 Femenino 2026

Tournament details
- Host country: Paraguay
- Dates: 24 April – 9 May
- Teams: 10 (from 1 confederation)
- Venues: 3 (in 2 host cities)

Final positions
- Champions: Brazil (6th title)
- Runners-up: Argentina

Tournament statistics
- Matches played: 25
- Goals scored: 73 (2.92 per match)
- Top scorer: (Chile) Antonella Martinez (7 goals)

The 2026 South American Under-17 Women's Football Championship, officially the 2026 CONMEBOL Sub17 Femenina, was the 10th edition of the South American U-17 Women's Championship (CONMEBOL Sub17 Femenina), the biennial international youth football championship organised by CONMEBOL for the women's under-17 national teams of South America. It was held in Paraguay from 24 April to 9 May 2026.

The top four teams of the tournament qualified for the 2026 FIFA U-17 Women's World Cup in Morocco as the CONMEBOL representatives.

Paraguay were the defending champions having won the title in 2025.

== Host and venues ==
CONMEBOL announced Asunción, Ypané and Villeta as host cities, with the Estadio Defensores del Chaco, Centro de Alto Rendimiento de Fútbol Femenino - CARFEM and the Estadio Ameliano being the venues for the matches.

Asunción	Ypané	Villeta
Estadio Defensores del Chaco	CARFEM	Estadio Ameliano
Capacity: 42,354	Capacity: 5,000	Capacity: 7,000

== Teams ==
All ten CONMEBOL member national teams are eligible to enter the tournament.

Team	Appearance	Previous best top-4 performance
Argentina	10th	Fourth place (2008, 2012)
Bolivia	10th	None
Brazil	10th	Champions (2010, 2012, 2018, 2022, 2024)
Chile	10th	Runners-up (2010)
Colombia	10th	Champions (2008)
Ecuador	10th	Third place (2024, 2025)
Paraguay (host & holders)	10th	Champions (2025)
Peru	10th	None
Uruguay	10th	Runners-up (2012)
Venezuela	10th	Champions (2013, 2016)

== Referee ==
The appointment of referees was published on April 8, 2026.

Referee	Assistant referees	
(Argentina) Luciana Sánchez	(Argentina) Daiana Milone	(Argentina) Belem Bevilacqua
(Bolivia) Jhanet Portugal	(Bolivia) Maricela Urapuca	(Bolivia) Ruth Lima
(Brazil) Gleika Oliveira	(Brazil) Gizeli Casaril	(Brazil) Fernanda Kruger
(Chile) Valentina Velásquez	(Chile) Leslie Vásquez	(Chile) Yomara Salazar
(Colombia) Erika Sánchez	(Colombia) Laura Loaiza	(Colombia) Carolina Vicuña
(Ecuador) Daniela Arroyo	(Ecuador) Marilyn Silverio	(Ecuador) Joselyn Romero
(Paraguay) Gabriela Arce	(Paraguay) Lorena Miranda	(Paraguay) Claudia Delvalle
(Peru) Gaby Oncoy	(Peru) Pamela Eulogio	(Peru) Vera Yupanqui
(Uruguay) Silvia Ríos	(Uruguay) Adela Sánchez	(Uruguay) Sofía Sarzay
(Venezuela) Leinny Rodríguez	(Venezuela) Francis García	(Venezuela) Elibith Higuera

== Draw ==
The draw of the tournament was held on 10 March 2026 at the CONMEBOL headquarters in Luque, Paraguay. The ten teams were drawn into two groups of five. The hosts Paraguay were the defending champions and were seeded into Group A. Brazil were seeded into Group B as the 2025 edition runner up and assigned to position 1 in their group, while the remaining teams were placed into four "pairing pots" according to their results in the 2025 South American U-17 Women's Championship (shown in brackets).

Seeded	Pot 1	Pot 2	Pot 3	Pot 4
Paraguay (1) (Hosts & Title holders, assigned to A1); Brazil (2) (2025 Runner up, assigned to B1)	Ecuador (3); Colombia (4)	Chile (5); Peru (6)	Argentina (7); Venezuela (8)	Uruguay (9); Bolivia (10)

From each pot, the first team drawn was placed into Group A and the second team drawn was placed into Group B. In both groups, teams from pot 1 were allocated in position 2, teams from pot 2 in position 3, teams from pot 3 in position 4 and teams from pot 4 in position 5.

The draw resulted in the following groups:

Group A
Pos	Team
A1	Paraguay
A2	Colombia
A3	Chile
A4	Argentina
A5	Bolivia

Group B
Pos	Team
B1	Brazil
B2	Ecuador
B3	Peru
B4	Venezuela
B5	Uruguay

== Group stage ==
Tiebreakers

In the group stage, teams were ranked according to points earned (3 points for a win, 1 point for a draw, 0 points for a loss). If tied on points, tiebreakers would be applied in the following order (Regulations Article 20):

1. Head-to-head result between tied teams;
  - Points in head-to-head matches among the tied teams;
  - Goal difference in head-to-head matches among the tied teams;
  - Goals scored in head-to-head matches among the tied teams;
2. Goal difference in all group matches;
3. Goals scored in all group matches;
4. Fewest red cards received;
5. Fewest yellow cards received;
6. Drawing of lots.

All match times are local times, PYT (UTC−3), as listed by CONMEBOL.

=== Group A ===
Pos	Team	Pld	W	D	L	GF	GA	GD	Pts	Qualification
1	Argentina	4	2	2	0	8	3	+5	8	Final stage
2	Chile	4	2	2	0	12	3	+9	8	Final stage
3	Colombia	4	2	2	0	7	1	+6	8	Final stage
4	Paraguay (H)	4	1	0	3	1	7	−6	3	
5	Bolivia	4	0	0	4	1	15	−14	0	

Source: CONMEBOL
Rules for classification: Tiebreakers
(H) Hosts
24 April 2026
17:00

Bolivia	1-8	Chile
Torrico 54'	Report	Carmona 11'; Concha 23' 30'; Muñoz 28', 33', 76' (pen.); Martínez 48'; Abarca 61'

CARFEM, Ypané
Referee: (Brazil) Gleika Oliveira
24 April 2026
20:00

Paraguay	0–2	Argentina
	Report	Gómez 31'; Aguilar 41'

CARFEM, Ypané
Referee: (Uruguay) Silvia Ríos

26 April 2026
17:00

Argentina	1-1	Colombia
torre 16'	Report	Ruiz 32'

Estadio Defensores del Chaco, Asunción
Referee: (Peru) Gaby Oncoy
26 April 2026
20:00

Bolivia	0-1	Paraguay
	Report	Cabrera 40'

Estadio Defensores del Chaco, Asunción
Referee: (Ecuador) Daniela Arroyo

28 April 2026
17:00

Argentina	3-0	Bolivia
Cinde 43'; Maldonado 52'; Hernández 73'	Report

Estadio Ameliano, Villeta
Referee: (Venezuela) Leinny Rodríguez
28 April 2026
20:00

Colombia	0–0	Chile
	Report

Estadio Ameliano, Villeta
Referee: (Uruguay) Silvia Ríos

30 April 2026
16:00

Colombia	3-0	Bolivia
Rodríguez 5'; Torrico 43' (o.g.); Henao 68'	Report

Estadio Defensores del Chaco, Asunción
Referee: (Ecuador) Daniela Arroyo
30 April 2026
19:00

Chile	2–0	Paraguay
Concha 15'; Martínez 63'	Report

Estadio Defensores del Chaco, Asunción
Referee: (Brazil) Gleika Oliveira

3 May 2026
20:00

Chile	2–2	Argentina
Ruiz 76'	Report	Bareiro 23'

Estadio Ameliano, Villeta
Referee: (Peru) Gaby Oncoy
3 May 2026
20:00

Paraguay	0-3	Colombia
	Report	Torres 6' (pen.); Cuesta 9'; Henao 90'

CARFEM, Ypané
Referee: (Venezuela) Leinny Rodríguez

=== Group B ===
Pos	Team	Pld	W	D	L	GF	GA	GD	Pts	Qualification
1	Brazil	4	4	0	0	16	3	+13	12	Final stage
2	Venezuela	4	2	0	2	5	3	+2	6	Final stage
3	Ecuador	4	1	2	1	2	5	−3	5	Final stage
4	Uruguay	4	1	1	2	6	7	−1	4	
5	Peru	4	0	1	3	1	12	−11	1	

Source: CONMEBOL
Rules for classification: Tiebreakers
25 April 2026
17:00

Uruguay	3-0	Peru
Rijo 20'; Tola 24'; Betancur 89'	Report

Estadio Ameliano, Villeta
Referee: (Paraguay) Gabriela Arce
25 April 2026
20:00

Brazil	2–0	Venezuela
Gigi 23'; Mari Gigante 74'	Report

Estadio Ameliano, Villeta
Referee: (Argentina) Luciana Sánchez

27 April 2026
17:00

Venezuela	0–1	Ecuador
	Report	Ortiz 75'

Estadio Ameliano, Villeta
Attendance: (Chile) Valentina Velásquez
27 April 2026
20:00

Uruguay	3–5	Brazil
Sánchez 20', 45'; Tola 86'	Report	Helena 6' (pen.); Nicolly 33', 70'; Mari Gigante 84'; Gigi 90+4'

Estadio Ameliano, Villeta
Referee: (Colombia) Erika Sánchez

29 April 2026
17:00

Venezuela	2-0	Uruguay
Alfonso 76'; Núñez 90+4'	Report

Estadio Defensores del Chaco, Asunción
Referee: (Paraguay) Gabriela Arce
29 April 2026
20:00

Ecuador	1-1	Peru
Guaranda 75'	Report	Carabalí 58' (o.g.)

Estadio Defensores del Chaco, Asunción
Referee: (Bolivia) Jhanet Portugal

1 May 2026
17:30

Ecuador	0-0	Uruguay
	Report

Estadio Ameliano, Villeta
Referee: (Argentina) Luciana Sánchez
1 May 2026
20:00

Peru	0–5	Brazil
	Report	Mari Gigante 11'; Nicolly 34'; Marcela Bontorim 48', 80', 83'

Estadio Ameliano, Villeta
Referee: (Chile) Valentina Velásquez

3 May 2026
17:00

Brazil	4-0	Ecuador
Carabalí 16' (o.g.); Gigi 22'; Marcela Bontorim 58'; Mariane 75'	Report

Estadio Ameliano, Villeta
Referee: (Bolivia) Jhanet Portugal
3 May 2026
17:00

Peru	0-3	Venezuela
	Report	Briceño 14'; Alejo 61' (pen.); Montero 78' (pen.)

CARFEM, Ypané
Referee: (Colombia) Erika Sánchez

== Final Stage ==
=== Bracket ===
Semi-finals
6 May – Estadio Defensores del Chaco, Asunción
Argentina	1
Venezuela	0
6 May – Estadio Defensores del Chaco, Asunción
Brazil (p)	2 (5)
Chile	2 (3)

Final
9 May – Estadio Defensores del Chaco, Asunción
Argentina	2
Brazil	3

Play-in matches for 2026 FIFA U-17 Women's World Cup 9 May 2026 – Estadio Ameliano, Villeta
Venezuela	1
Colombia	0
9 May 2026 – Estadio Ameliano, Villeta
Chile	2
Ecuador	1

==== Semi-finals ====
6 May 2026
17:00

Argentina	1-0	Venezuela
Maldonado 88' (pen.)	Report

Estadio Defensores del Chaco, Asunción
Referee: (Uruguay) Silvia Ríos
9 May 2026
20:00

Brazil	2–2	Chile
Gamonal 51'; Mari Gigante 83'	Report	Abarca 68'; Cornejo 72'
Penalties
Pepê (penalty scored); Isa Rech (penalty scored); Mari Gigante (penalty scored); Marcela Bontorim (penalty scored); Nicolly (penalty scored)	5–3	(penalty scored) Farías; (penalty scored) Abarca; (penalty scored) Benavides; (penalty missed) Sánchez

Estadio Defensores del Chaco, Asunción
Referee: (Paraguay) Gabriela Arce

==== Play-in matches ====
9 May 2026
14:00

Venezuela	1–0	Colombia
Suárez 25'	Report

Estadio Ameliano, Villeta
Referee: (Peru) Gaby Oncoy
9 May 2026
17:00

Chile	2–1	Ecuador
Martínez 9'; Muñoz 90'	Report	Cerda 26'

Estadio Ameliano, Villeta
Referee: (Brazil) Gleika Oliveira

==== Final ====
9 May 2026
19:30

Argentina	2–3	Brazil
Diz 4'; Galarza 62'	Report	Gamonal 29'; Helena 45+3' (pen.); Nicolly 45+5'

Estadio Defensores del Chaco, Asunción
Referee: (Colombia) Erika Sánchez

== Goalscorers ==
There were 73 goals scored in 25 matches, for an average of 2.92 goals per match.

5 goals

- (Chile) Martinez A.

4 goals

- (Chile) Munoz C.
- (Brazil) Silva M.
- (Brazil) Candido M.
- (Brazil) Silva N.

3 goals

- (Chile) Concha K.
- (Brazil) Ferreira G.

2 goals

- (Brazil) Vieira H.
- (Chile) Abarca A.
- (Argentina) Diz M.
- (Brazil) Gamonal S.
- (Colombia) Henao M.
- (Argentina) Galarza J.
- (Argentina) Maldonado A.
- (Uruguay) Sanchez S.
- (Uruguay) Tola O.

1 goal

- (Chile) Carmona M.
- (Argentina) Conde L.
- (Colombia) Cuesta R.
- (Brazil) Mariane
- (Venezuela) Suarez A.
- (Argentina) Torre M.
- (Colombia) Torres H.
- (Argentina) Aguilar J.
- (Venezuela) Alejo A.
- (Venezuela) Alfonzo K.
- (Uruguay) Bentancur C.
- (Venezuela) Briceno M.
- (Paraguay) Cabrera S.
- (Ecuador) Cerda A.
- (Chile) Cornejo E.
- (Argentina) Gomez O.
- (Ecuador) Guaranda J.
- (Argentina) Hernandez L.
- (Venezuela) Montero V.
- (Venezuela) Nunez V.
- (Ecuador) Ortiz S.
- (Uruguay) Rijo C.
- (Colombia) Rodriguez A.
- (Colombia) Ruiz E.

== Qualified teams for FIFA U-17 Women's World Cup ==
The following four teams from CONMEBOL qualified for the 2026 FIFA U-17 Women's World Cup in Morocco.

Team	Qualified on	Previous appearances in tournament
Brazil	6 May 2026	8 (2008, 2010, 2012, 2016, 2018, 2022, 2024, 2025)
Argentina	6 May 2026	0 (Debut)
Venezuela	9 May 2026	2 (2014, 2016)
Chile	9 May 2025	2 (2010, 2022)
