= Colombia women's national under-17 football team =

Colombia
- Nickname(s): Las Cafeteras (The Coffee Growers); Las Chicas Superpoderosas (The Powerpuff Girls)
- Association: Federación Colombiana de Fútbol (FCF)
- Confederation: CONMEBOL (South America)
- Head coach: Carlos Paniagua
- FIFA code: COL
First colours	Second colours

First international
- Ecuador 1–1 Colombia (Melipilla, Chile; 14 January 2008)

Biggest win
- Peru 0–7 Colombia (Montevideo, Uruguay; 3 March 2022)

Biggest defeat
- Brazil 5–1 Colombia (Santa Cruz de la Sierra, Bolivia; 15 March 2012); Mexico 4–0 Colombia (Alajuela, Costa Rica; 16 March 2014); Venezuela 4–0 Colombia (Barquisimeto, Venezuela; 14 March 2016); Spain 4–0 Colombia (Salé, Morocco; 19 October 2025); Japan 4–0 Colombia (Salé, Morocco; 29 October 2025)

South American Under-17 Women's Football Championship
- Appearances: 9 (first in 2008)
- Best result: Champions (2008)

FIFA U-17 Women's World Cup
- Appearances: 7 (first in 2008)
- Best result: Runners-up (2022)

The Colombia women's national under-17 football team represents Colombia in international women's football at under-17 competitions and are controlled by the Colombian Football Federation. They are a member of the CONMEBOL.

In 2022, they were winners of the Women's Revelations Cup in Mexico, and later runner-up of 2022 FIFA U-17 Women's World Cup.

== Competitive record ==
*Draws include knockout matches decided on penalty kicks. **Gold background colour indicates that the tournament was won. ***Red border colour indicates tournament was held on home soil.

Champions Runners-up Third Place Fourth place

=== FIFA U-17 Women's World Cup ===
Year	Result	Pld	W	D*	L	GF	GA	Squad
(New Zealand) 2008	Group stage	3	0	2	1	3	5	Squad
(Trinidad and Tobago) 2010	Did not qualify							
(Azerbaijan) 2012	Group stage	3	1	0	2	4	4	Squad
(Costa Rica) 2014	Group stage	3	0	0	3	2	9	Squad
(Jordan) 2016	Did not qualify							
(Uruguay) 2018	Group stage	3	0	2	1	2	5	Squad
(India) 2022	Runners-up	6	3	1	2	7	3	Squad
(Dominican Republic) 2024	Group stage	3	0	1	2	2	5	Squad
(Morocco) 2025	Round of 16	4	2	0	2	4	8	Squad
(Morocco) 2026	Did not qualify							
(Morocco) 2027	To be determined							
(Morocco) 2028	To be determined							
(Morocco) 2029	To be determined							
Total	7/13	25	6	6	13	24	39	–

* Draws include knockout matches decided via penalty shoot-out.

=== South American Under-17 Women's Football Championship ===
Year	Round	Position	Pld	W	D*	L	GF	GA
(Chile) 2008	Champions	1st	7	4	2	1	22	8
(Brazil) 2010	First stage	7th	4	2	0	2	6	5
(Bolivia) 2012	Third place	3rd	7	4	0	3	15	11
(Paraguay) 2013	Runners-up	2nd	7	4	1	2	12	7
(Venezuela) 2016	Fourth place	4th	7	2	1	4	5	9
(Argentina) 2018	Runners-up	2nd	7	5	1	1	15	3
(Uruguay) 2022	Runners-up	2nd	7	6	0	1	20	2
(Paraguay) 2024	Runners-up	2nd	7	4	2	1	13	8
(Colombia) 2025	Fourth place	4th	9	3	3	3	10	6
(Paraguay) 2026	Play-offs	6th	5	2	2	1	7	2
Total	10/10	2nd/10	67	36	12	19	125	61

== Head-to-head record ==
The following table shows Colombia's head-to-head record in the FIFA U-17 Women's World Cup.

Opponent	Pld	W	D	L	GF	GA	GD	Win %
Azerbaijan	1	1	0	0	4	0	+4	100.00
Canada	3	0	1	2	1	5	−4	0.00
China	2	1	0	1	3	3	+0	50.00
Denmark	1	0	1	0	1	1	+0	0.00
Ivory Coast	1	1	0	0	3	0	+3	100.00
Japan	1	0	0	1	0	4	−4	0.00
Mexico	2	1	0	1	2	5	−3	50.00
New Zealand	1	0	0	1	1	3	−2	0.00
Nigeria	3	0	1	2	1	5	−4	0.00
South Korea	3	1	2	0	3	2	+1	33.33
Spain	5	0	1	4	2	9	−7	0.00
Tanzania	1	1	0	0	3	0	+3	100.00
United States	1	0	0	1	0	2	−2	0.00
Total	25	6	6	13	24	39	−15	24.00

== Schedule and results ==
Win Draw Loss

=== 2025 ===
19 October World Cup GS	Spain	4–0	Colombia	Mohammed VI Football Academy (pitch 1), Salé
20:00	Quer 15'; Chacón 28', 45+1'; Cristóbal 78'	Report		Attendance: 637; Referee: Alyssa Pennington (United States)

22 October World Cup GS	Ivory Coast	0–3	Colombia	Mohammed VI Football Academy (pitch 2), Salé
20:00		Report	Clavijo 22'; Crawford 80'; Martínez 90+5'	Attendance: 1,345; Referee: Veronika Bernatskaia (Kyrgyzstan)

25 October World Cup GS	Colombia	1–0	South Korea	Mohammed VI Football Academy (pitch 2), Salé
14:00	Crawford 73'	Report		Attendance: 374; Referee: Silvia Gasperotti (Italy)

29 October World Cup R16	Japan	4–0	Colombia	Mohammed VI Football Academy (pitch 2), Salé
20:00	Ono 10'; Fukushima 22', 57'; Nakamura 43'	Report		Attendance: 881; Referee: Alyssa Pennington (United States)

=== 2026 ===
26 April South American Championship GS	Argentina	1–1	Colombia	Estadio Defensores del Chaco, Asunción
17:00	Torre 16'	Report	Ruiz 32'	Referee: Gaby Oncoy (Peru)

28 April South American Championship GS	Colombia	0–0	Chile	Estadio Ameliano, Villeta
20:00		Report		Referee: Silvia Ríos (Uruguay)

30 April South American Championship GS	Colombia	3–0	Bolivia	Estadio Defensores del Chaco, Asunción
16:00	A. Rodríguez 5'; Torrico 43' (o.g.); Henao 68'	Report		Referee: Daniela Arroyo (Ecuador)

3 May South American Championship GS	Colombia	3–0	Paraguay	Estadio Defensores del Chaco, Asunción
18:00	D. Torres 8' (pen.); Cuesta 18'; Henao 90'	Report		Referee: Leinny Rodríguez (Venezuela)

9 May South American Championship FP	Venezuela	1–0	Colombia	Estadio Defensores del Chaco, Asunción
12:00	Suárez 25'	Report		Referee: Gaby Oncoy (Peru)

== Current squad ==
The following 22 players were called up for the 2026 South American U-17 Women's Championship.

No.	Pos.	Player	Date of birth (age)	Club
1	GK	Sofia Prieto	25 September 2009 (age 17)	(Colombian Football Federation) Deportivo Cali
12	GK	Emyli Ortega	9 January 2009 (age 17)	(Colombian Football Federation) Atlético Nacional
22	GK	Gabriela Delgadillo	9 February 2011 (age 15)	(Colombian Football Federation) Internacional de Bogotá
2	DF	Mariana Rodriguez	9 May 2009 (age 17)	(Colombian Football Federation) Independiente Santa Fe
3	DF	Ana Marin	9 February 2009 (age 17)	(Colombian Football Federation) Millonarios
4	DF	Emiliana Isaza	5 February 2010 (age 16)	(Colombian Football Federation) Atlético Nacional
5	DF	Sara Rojas	15 September 2009 (age 17)	(Colombian Football Federation) Llaneros
6	MF	Lauren Chamorro	31 August 2009 (age 17)	(Colombian Football Federation) América de Cali
7	MF	Andrea Rodriguez	23 October 2009 (age 17)	(Colombian Football Federation) Millonarios
8	MF	Juanita Parga	22 September 2009 (age 17)	(Colombian Football Federation) América de Cali
13	MF	Sally Garzon	14 November 2009 (age 16)	(Colombian Football Federation) Millonarios
14	MF	Karen Correa	17 September 2009 (age 17)	(Colombian Football Federation) Inter Palmira
20	MF	Rihanna Cuesta	20 February 2010 (age 16)	(Colombian Football Federation) Millonarios
21	MF	Melanie Sierra	10 June 2009 (age 17)	(Colombian Football Federation) Millonarios
9	FW	Helis Torres	7 July 2009 (age 17)	(Colombian Football Federation) Orsomarso
10	FW	Joy Palacios	1 October 2009 (age 17)	(United States Soccer Federation) Montverde International FC
11	FW	Vanessa Puerta	21 May 2009 (age 17)	(Colombian Football Federation) Susa FC Academy
15	FW	Eidy Ruiz	1 April 2009 (age 17)	(Colombian Football Federation) Deportivo Cali
16	FW	Saileth Bonett	22 April 2009 (age 17)	(Colombian Football Federation) Junior
17	FW	Izabela Cortes	27 January 2009 (age 17)	(Colombian Football Federation) Independiente Santa Fe
18	FW	Maura Henao	14 July 2010 (age 16)	(Colombian Football Federation) América de Cali
19	FW	Oriana Torres	19 June 2010 (age 16)	(Colombian Football Federation) Atlas CP

=== Previous squads ===
- 2008 FIFA U-17 Women's World Cup
- 2012 FIFA U-17 Women's World Cup
- 2018 FIFA U-17 Women's World Cup
- 2022 FIFA U-17 Women's World Cup
- 2024 FIFA U-17 Women's World Cup

== Honours ==
Colombia at the 2025 South American U-17 Women's Championship

- FIFA U-17 Women's World Cup:
  - Runners-up (1): 2022
- South American Under-17 Women's Football Championship:
  - Champions (1): 2008
  - Runners-up (4): 2013, 2018, 2022, 2024
  - Third place (1): 2012
  - Fourth place (2): 2016, 2025
