= Argentina women's national under-17 football team =

National youth soccer team

Argentina U-17 women's national football team
- Nickname(s): Albicelestes (White and Sky Blue)
- Association: Argentine Football Association
- Confederation: CONMEBOL (South America)
- Head coach: Christian Meloni
- Captain: Agustina Maldonado
- FIFA code: ARG
First colours	Second colours

First international
- Argentina 5–1 Bolivia (Melipilla, Chile; 12 January 2008)

Biggest win
- Argentina 5–1 Bolivia (Melipilla, Chile; 12 January 2008)

Biggest defeat
- Argentina 1–7 Russia (Caseros, Argentina; 30 October 2023)

South American Under-17 Women's Football Championship
- Appearances: 10 (first in 2008)
- Best result: Runners-up (2026)

FIFA U-17 Women's World Cup
- Appearances: 1 (first in 2026)
- Best result: Round of 16 (2026)

The Argentina U-17 women's national football team represents Argentina in international U-17 women's football. Is the representative in all FIFA sponsored tournaments that pertain to that category. In 2026, they qualified for first time to a FIFA U-17 Women's World Cup.

== Competitive record ==
Champions Runners-up Third place Fourth place

=== FIFA U-17 Women's World Cup ===
Year	Position	Matches	Wins	Draws	Loss	GF	GA
(New Zealand) 2008	Did not qualify
(Trinidad and Tobago) 2010	Did not qualify
(Azerbaijan) 2012	Did not qualify
(Costa Rica) 2014	Did not qualify
(Jordan) 2016	Did not qualify
(Uruguay) 2018	Did not qualify
(India) 2022	Did not qualify
(Dominican Republic) 2024	Did not qualify
(Morocco) 2025	Did not qualify
(Morocco) 2026	Round of 16	4	2	1	1	9	4
Total	Round of 16	4	2	1	1	9	4

=== South American Under-17 Women's Football Championship ===
Year	Position	Matches	Wins	Draws	Loss	GF	GA
(Chile) 2008	4th place	7	4	0	3	15	13
(Brazil) 2010	5th place	4	2	1	1	5	4
(Bolivia) 2012	4th place	7	3	0	4	11	17
(Paraguay) 2013	7th place	4	0	3	1	4	6
(Venezuela) 2016	9th place	4	0	1	3	2	10
(Argentina) 2018	7th place	4	1	1	2	4	8
(Uruguay) 2022	5th place	4	2	1	1	6	4
(Paraguay) 2024	7th place	4	1	2	1	4	3
(Colombia) 2025	7th place	4	1	2	1	4	5
(Paraguay) 2026	Runners-up	6	3	2	1	11	6
Total	10/10	48	17	13	18	66	76

== Results and fixtures ==
The following is a list of match results in the last 12 months, as well as any future matches that have been scheduled.

Legend

Win Draw Loss Void or postponed Fixture

=== 2026 ===
27 March 2026 Friendly	Uruguay	1–1	Argentina	Colonia del Sacramento, Uruguay
19:30 UYT (UTC−3)	Morena 80'	Report	Bralo 9'	Stadium: Estadio Profesor Alberto Suppici

29 March 2026 Friendly	Uruguay	1–2	Argentina	Colonia del Sacramento, Uruguay
15:30 UYT (UTC−3)	Torelli 89'	Report	Torre 37'; Conde 42'	Stadium: Estadio Juan Gaspar Prandi

24 April 2026 South American U-17 Championship GS	Paraguay	0–2	Argentina	Ypané, Paraguay
20:00 PYT (UTC−3)		Report	O. Gómez 31'; Aguilar 41'	Stadium: Estadio CARFEM; Referee: Silvia Ríos (Uruguay)

26 April 2026 South American U-17 Championship GS	Argentina	1–1	Colombia	Asunción, Paraguay
17:00 PYT (UTC−3)	Torre 16'	Report	Ruiz 32'	Stadium: Estadio Defensores del Chaco; Referee: Gaby Oncoy (Peru)

28 April 2026 South American U-17 Championship GS	Argentina	3–0	Bolivia	Villeta, Paraguay
17:00 PYT (UTC−3)	Conde 43'; Maldonado 52'; Hernández 73'	Report		Stadium: Estadio Ameliano; Referee: Leinny Rodríguez (Venezuela)

3 May 2026 South American U-17 Championship GS	Chile	2–2	Argentina	Villeta, Paraguay
20:00 PYT (UTC−3)	Martínez 3', 82'	Report	Diz 10' (pen.); Galarza 55'	Stadium: Estadio Ameliano; Referee: Gaby Oncoy (Peru)

6 May 2026 South American U-17 Championship SF	Argentina	1–0	Venezuela	Asunción, Paraguay
17:00 PYT (UTC−3)	Maldonado 88' (pen.)	Report		Stadium: Estadio Defensores del Chaco; Referee: Silvia Ríos (Uruguay)

9 May 2026 South American U-17 Championship F	Argentina	2–3	Brazil	Asunción, Paraguay
19:30 PYT (UTC−3)	Diz 4'; Galarza 62'	Report	Gamonal 29'; Helena 45+3' (pen.); Nicolly 45+5'	Stadium: Estadio Defensores del Chaco; Referee: Erika Sánchez (Colombia)

== Players ==
=== Current squad ===
The following 22 players were called up for the 2026 South American U-17 Women's Championship.

No.	Pos.	Player	Date of birth (age)	Caps	Goals	Club
1	GK	Bianca Virga	30 March 2011 (age 15)			(Argentine Football Association) Belgrano
12	GK	Araceli Saleme	1 December 2009 (age 16)			(Argentine Football Association) River Plate
22	GK	María Goffi	5 May 2010 (age 16)			(Argentine Football Association) Talleres
3	DF	Ludmila Cardozo	5 January 2009 (age 17)			(Argentine Football Association) Boca Juniors
4	DF	Emma Díaz	26 May 2009 (age 17)			(Argentine Football Association) Boca Juniors
10	DF	Josefina Galarza	19 June 2011 (age 15)			(Argentine Football Association) Belgrano
13	DF	Briana Lagartera	19 January 2011 (age 15)			(Argentine Football Association) Boca Juniors
15	DF	Ana Noya	5 January 2009 (age 17)			(Argentine Football Association) Belgrano
2	MF	Julia Vinhas Robledo	27 May 2009 (age 17)			(Argentine Football Association) Platense
5	MF	Agustina Maldonado (captain)	19 March 2009 (age 17)			(Argentine Football Association) River Plate
6	MF	Oriana Bralo	12 February 2009 (age 17)			(Argentine Football Association) Boca Juniors
14	MF	Mía Gamarra	12 September 2009 (age 17)			(Argentine Football Association) Independiente
16	MF	Macarena Torre	1 February 2010 (age 16)			(Argentine Football Association) River Plate
20	MF	Valentina Burgos	23 July 2009 (age 17)			(Argentine Football Association) Boca Juniors
21	MF	Lola Conde	27 September 2009 (age 17)			(Argentine Football Association) Rosario Central
7	FW	Julieta Aguilar	29 July 2010 (age 16)			(Argentine Football Association) Newell's Old Boys
8	FW	Brunella Pilati	22 November 2010 (age 15)			(United States Soccer Federation) Racing Louisville FC
9	FW	Mercedes Diz	24 February 2009 (age 17)			(Argentine Football Association) River Plate
11	FW	Analía Insfrán	6 October 2010 (age 16)			(Argentine Football Association) Banfield
17	FW	Oriana Gómez	18 January 2009 (age 17)			(Argentine Football Association) San Lorenzo
18	FW	Lola Hernández	22 July 2010 (age 16)			(Argentine Football Association) Talleres
19	FW	Ignacia Mestre	26 November 2009 (age 16)			(Argentine Football Association) Talleres

== Coaching staff ==
=== Current coaching staff ===
Position	Name
Head coach	(Argentina) Christian Meloni
Assistant coach	(Argentina) Esteban Pizzi
Assistant coach	(Argentina) Clarisa Huber
Fitness coach	(Argentina) Gabriel Denava
Goalkeeping coach	(Argentina) Lucas Behrens

== See also ==
- Women's football in Argentina
- Argentina women's national football team
  - Argentina women's national under-20 football team
