= Peru women's national under-17 football team =

Peru Women's U-17
- Nickname(s): La Bicolor (The Bicolour); La Blanquirroja (The White And Red); La Rojiblanca (The Red and White)
- Association: Peruvian Football Federation
- Confederation: CONMEBOL (South America)
- Head coach: Michelle González
- Captain: Alba Soto
- Home stadium: Estadio Nacional
- FIFA code: PER
First colours	Second colours

First international
- Peru 1–4 Paraguay (Peñalolén, Chile; 13 January 2008)

Biggest win
- Peru 3–1 Ecuador (São Paulo, Brazil; 31 January 2010); Peru 3–1 Bolivia (Palmira, Colombia; 5 May 2025)

Biggest defeat
- Peru 0–8 Venezuela (Barquisimeto, Ecuador; 3 March 2016)

South American Under-17 Women's Football Championship
- Appearances: 10 (first in 2008)
- Best result: Fifth Place (2008)

The Peru women's national under-17 football team represents Peru in international women's football age of U-17 and is controlled by the Peruvian Football Federation (FPF) as a part of the CONMEBOL federation. The team plays in South American Under-17 Women's Football Championship, where their best performance was a fifth place finish in 2008. They have yet to qualify for the FIFA U-17 Women's World Cup.

== Team image ==
=== Nicknames ===
The Peru women's national under-17 football team has been nicknamed as "La Blanquirroja" or "La Rojiblanca (The White And Red)".

=== Home stadium ===
The team play most of its home matches in the Estadio Nacional in Lima. The stadium has a capacity of 50,000. The team also plays at other stadiums and the Villa Deportiva Nacional (VIDENA).

== Competitive record ==
=== FIFA U-17 Women's World Cup ===
FIFA U-17 Women's World Cup record
Year	Result	Pld	W	D	L	GF	GA
(New Zealand) 2008	Did not qualify						
(Trinidad and Tobago) 2010	Did not qualify						
(Azerbaijan) 2012	Did not qualify						
(Costa Rica) 2014	Did not qualify						
(Jordan) 2016	Did not qualify						
(Uruguay) 2018	Did not qualify						
(India) 2022	Did not qualify						
(Dominican Republic) 2024	Did not qualify						
(Morocco) 2025	Did not qualify						
(Morocco) 2026	Did not qualify						
Total	–	–	–	–	–	–	–

=== South American Under-17 Women's Championship ===
South American Under-17 Women's Football Championship record
Year	Round	Position	Pld	W	D	L	GF	GA
(Chile) 2008	Fifth place	5th	4	2	0	2	5	9
(Brazil) 2010	First stage	8th	4	1	0	3	3	13
(Bolivia) 2012	First stage	9th	4	0	1	3	4	11
(Paraguay) 2013	First stage	10th	4	0	1	3	2	10
(Venezuela) 2016	First stage	8th	4	1	0	3	2	16
(Argentina) 2018	First stage	8th	4	1	0	3	2	10
(Uruguay) 2022	First stage	9th	4	0	0	4	1	15
(Paraguay) 2024	First stage	8th	4	1	0	3	1	9
(Colombia) 2025	Final stage	6th	9	2	0	7	8	28
(Paraguay) 2026	First stage	9th	4	0	1	3	1	12
Total	Fifth place	0 titles	45	8	3	34	29	133
