= South American Under-17 Women's Football Championship =

CONMEBOL Sub 17 Femenina
- Organizer(s): CONMEBOL
- Founded: 2008; 18 years ago
- Region: South America
- Teams: 10
- Qualifier for: FIFA U-17 Women's World Cup
- Related competitions: South American U-17 Championship; CONMEBOL Sub 20 Femenina
- Current champion: Brazil (6th title)
- Most championships: Brazil (6 titles)
- Website: conmebol.com/sub17femenino
- 2026 South American Under-17 Women's Football Championship

The CONMEBOL Sub 17 Femenina is a South American football tournament organized by the CONMEBOL for South American national teams of women under age of 17. It serves as a qualification tournament for the FIFA U-17 Women's World Cup.

== Results ==
Keys

- a.e.t.: result/match won after extra time
- p.: match won after penalty shoot-out
- TBD: to be determined

Ed.	Year	Host	Final			Third place game		
Ed.	Year	Host	Champions	Score	Runners-up	Third place	Score	Fourth place
1	2008	Chile	Colombia	– (Note: No match held so the winner was decided on points after a round-robin tournament.)	Brazil	Paraguay	–	Argentina
2	2010	Brazil	Brazil	7–0	Chile	Venezuela	1–0	Paraguay
3	2012	Bolivia	Brazil	–	Uruguay	Colombia	–	Argentina
4	2013	Paraguay	Venezuela	–	Colombia	Paraguay	–	Chile
5	2016	Venezuela	Venezuela	–	Brazil	Paraguay	–	Colombia
6	2018	Argentina	Brazil	–	Colombia	Uruguay	–	Venezuela
7	2022	Uruguay	Brazil	–	Colombia	Chile	–	Paraguay
8	2024	Paraguay	Brazil	–	Colombia	Ecuador	–	Paraguay
9	2025	Colombia	Paraguay	–	Brazil	Ecuador	–	Colombia
Edition	Year	Host	Final			Losing semi-finalists		
Edition	Year	Host	Champions	Score	Runners-up	Losing semi-finalists		
10	2026	Paraguay	Brazil	3–2	Argentina	Chile and Venezuela		

== Performances by countries ==
Team	Titles	Runners-up	Third place	Fourth place	Semi-finalists	Total
Brazil	6 (2010, 2012, 2018, 2022, 2024, 2026)	3 (2008, 2016, 2025)				9
Venezuela	2 (2013, 2016)		1 (2010)	1 (2018)	1 (2026)	5
Colombia	1 (2008)	4 (2013, 2018, 2022, 2024)	1 (2012)	2 (2016, 2025)		8
Paraguay	1 (2025)		3 (2008, 2013, 2016)	3 (2010, 2022, 2024)		7
Chile		1 (2010)	1 (2022)	1 (2013)	1 (2026)	4
Uruguay		1 (2012)	1 (2018)			2
Argentina		1 (2026)		2 (2008, 2012)		3
Ecuador			2 (2024, 2025)			2

== Participating nations ==
Legend

- 1st – Champions
- 2nd – Runners-up
- 3rd – Third place
- 4th – Fourth place
- SF – Semi-finalists
- 5th – Fifth place
- 6th – Sixth place
- GS – Group stage
- — Hosts

Team	(Chile) 2008	(Brazil) 2010	(Bolivia) 2012	(Paraguay) 2013	(Venezuela) 2016	(Argentina) 2018	(Uruguay) 2022	(Paraguay) 2024	(Colombia) 2025	(Paraguay) 2026	Total
Argentina	4th	GS	4th	GS	GS	GS	GS	GS	GS	2nd	10
Bolivia	GS	GS	GS	GS	GS	GS	GS	GS	GS	GS	10
Brazil	2nd	1st	1st	GS	2nd	1st	1st	1st	2nd	1st	10
Chile	GS	2nd	GS	4th	GS	GS	3rd	GS	5th	SF	10
Colombia	1st	GS	3rd	2nd	4th	2nd	2nd	2nd	4th	GS	10
Ecuador	GS	GS	GS	GS	GS	GS	GS	3rd	3rd	GS	10
Paraguay	3rd	4th	GS	3rd	3rd	GS	4th	4th	1st	GS	10
Peru	GS	GS	GS	GS	GS	GS	GS	GS	6th	GS	10
Uruguay	GS	GS	2nd	GS	GS	3rd	GS	GS	GS	GS	10
Venezuela	GS	3rd	GS	1st	1st	4th	GS	GS	GS	SF	10

== FIFA World Cup qualification and results ==
From to 2008 to 2024 there were three teams qualified to the FIFA U-17 Women's World Cup; it has been four since 2025. Colombia has been the only South American team to reach the final finishing as runners-up in 2022. Venezuela placed in fourth place in 2014 and 2016, Brazil did the same in twice and Ecuador once. All other CONMEBOL teams have been eliminated in the group stage.

- 1st – Champions
- 2nd – Runners-up
- 3rd – Third place
- 4th – Fourth place
- QF – Quarter-finals
- R16 – Round of 16
- GS – Group stage
- Q – Qualified to subsequent World Cup
- – Hosts

World Cup	(New Zealand) 2008	(Trinidad and Tobago) 2010	(Azerbaijan) 2012	(Costa Rica) 2014	(Jordan) 2016	(Uruguay) 2018	(India) 2022	(Dominican Republic) 2024	(Morocco) 2025	(Morocco) 2026	Total
Argentina										R16	1
Brazil	GS	QF	QF		GS	GS	QF	GS	4th	4th	9
Chile		GS					GS			GS	3
Colombia	GS		GS	GS		GS	2nd	GS	R16		7
Ecuador								QF	GS		2
Paraguay	GS			GS	GS				R16		4
Uruguay			GS			GS					2
Venezuela		GS		4th	4th					QF	4

== See also ==
- South American U-17 (Men's) Championship
- South American Under-20 Women's Football Championship
