= Valentina Murrieta =

Mexican footballer (born 2008)

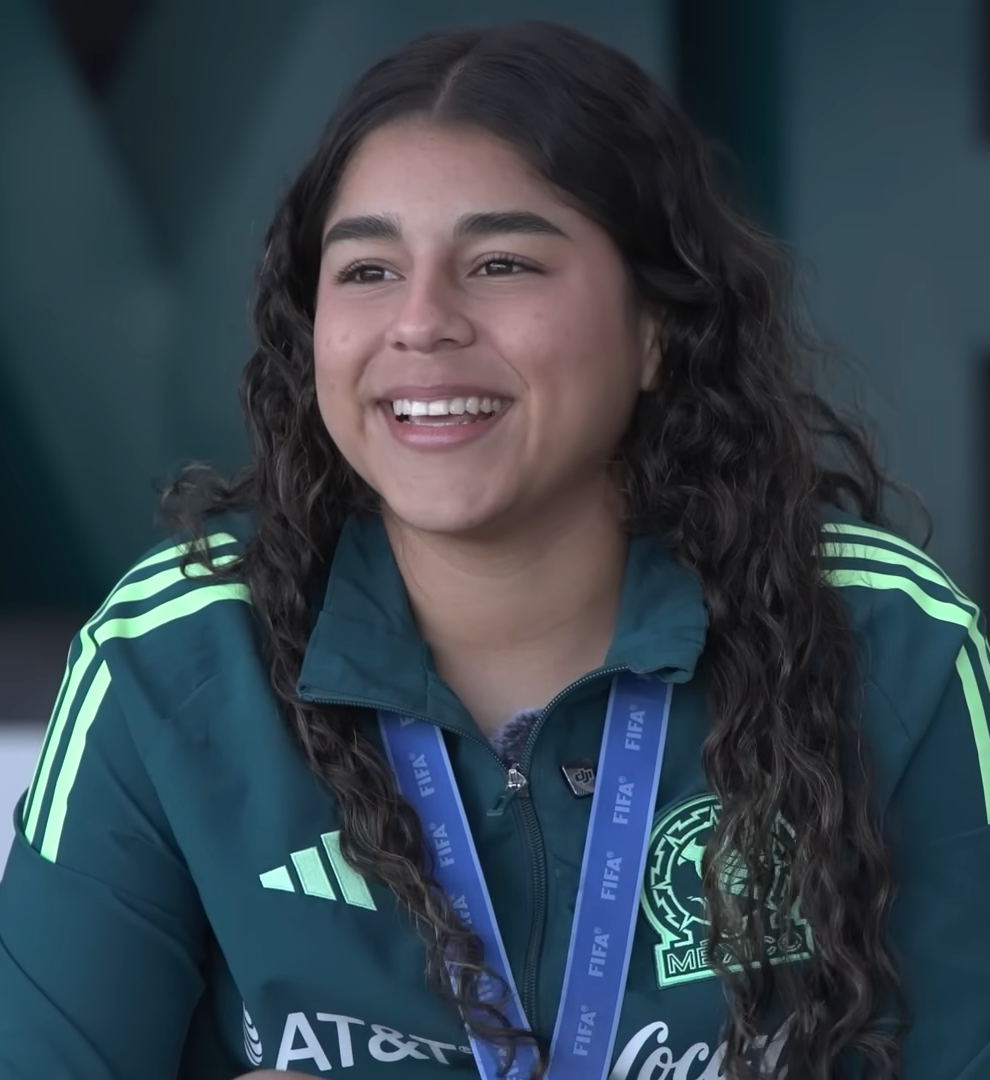
- Murrieta in 2025

Personal information
- Full name: Valentina Murrieta Ortiz
- Date of birth: 22 October 2008 (age 18)
- Place of birth: Alvarado, Veracruz, Mexico
- Height: 1.60 m (5 ft 3 in)
- Position: Goalkeeper

Team information
- Current team: América
- Number: 20

Youth career
- 2022–2026: América

Senior career*
Years	Team	Apps	(Gls)
2026–	América	0	(0)

International career^{‡}
2024–	Mexico U17		
Medal record
Women's football
Representing Mexico
FIFA U-17 Women's World Cup
Third place	2025 Morocco
CONCACAF Women's U-17 Championship
Runner-up	2024 Mexico
- * Club domestic league appearances and goals ‡ National team caps and goals as of 9 November 2025

Valentina Murrieta Ortiz (born 22 October 2008) is a Mexican professional footballer who plays as a goalkeeper for Liga Femenil club América.

During the 2025 FIFA U-17 Women's World Cup celebrated in Morocco, Murrieta was part of the Mexican team that secured third place and received the FIFA Golden Glove award for best goalkeeper in the tournament.

== Honours ==
Club América

- CONCACAF W Champions Cup: 2025–26

Mexico U-17

- FIFA U-17 Women's World Cup third place: 2025
- CONCACAF Women's U-17 Championship runner-up: 2024

Individual

- FIFA U-17 Women's World Cup Golden Glove: 2025
