= Italy women's national under-17 football team =

Selected team of Italian football players under 17 years

Italy Women's U-17
- Association: Italian Football Federation
- Confederation: UEFA (Europe)
- Head coach: Selena Mazzantini
- FIFA code: ITA
First colours	Second colours

UEFA Women's Under-17 Championship
- Appearances: 4 (first in 2014)
- Best result: Third place (2014, 2025)

FIFA U-17 Women's World Cup
- Appearances: 2 (first in 2014)
- Best result: Third place (2014)

The Italy women's national under-17 football team represents Italy in international football in under-17 categories and is controlled by the Italian Football Federation.

== FIFA U-17 Women's World Cup ==
Year	Result	Pld	W	D*	L	GF	GA
(New Zealand) 2008	Did not qualify						
(Trinidad and Tobago) 2010	Did not qualify						
(Azerbaijan) 2012	Did not qualify						
(Costa Rica) 2014	Third place	6	2	2	2	9	9
(Jordan) 2016	Did not qualify						
(Uruguay) 2018	Did not qualify						
(India) 2022	Did not qualify						
(Dominican Republic) 2024	Did not qualify						
(Morocco) 2025	Quarter-finals	5	4	1	0	14	4
(Morocco) 2026	Did not qualify						
(Morocco) 2027	To be determined						
(Morocco) 2028	To be determined						
(Morocco) 2029	To be determined						
Total	2/13	11	6	3	2	23	13

* Draws include knockout matches decided by penalty shoot-out.

== UEFA Women's Under-17 Championship ==
Year	Round	MP	W	D	L	GF	GA
(Switzerland) 2008	did not qualify
(Switzerland) 2009	did not qualify
(Switzerland) 2010	did not qualify
(Switzerland) 2011	did not qualify
(Switzerland) 2012	did not qualify
(Switzerland) 2013	did not qualify
(England) 2014	Third Place	5	2	1	2	3	2
(Iceland) 2015	did not qualify
(Belarus) 2016	Group Stage	3	0	2	1	1	3
(Czech Republic) 2017	did not qualify
(Lithuania) 2018	Group Stage	3	0	2	1	0	4
(Bulgaria) 2019	did not qualify
(Sweden) ~~2020~~	Cancelled
(Faroe Islands) ~~2021~~	Cancelled
(Bosnia and Herzegovina) 2022	did not qualify
(Estonia) 2023	did not qualify
(Sweden) 2024	did not qualify
(Faroe Islands) 2025	Semi-finals	4	2	1	1	8	8
(Northern Ireland) 2026	To be determined
(Finland) 2027	To be determined
(Belgium) 2028	To be determined
(Turkey) 2029	To be determined
Total	4/15	15	4	6	5	12	17

== Head-to-head record ==
The following table shows Italy's head-to-head record in the FIFA U-17 Women's World Cup.

Opponent	Pld	W	D	L	GF	GA	GD	Win %
Brazil	1	1	0	0	4	3	+1	100.00
Costa Rica	2	2	0	0	4	0	+4	100.00
Ghana	1	0	1	0	2	2	+0	0.00
Mexico	1	0	1	0	0	0	+0	0.00
Morocco	1	1	0	0	3	1	+2	100.00
Nigeria	1	1	0	0	4	0	+4	100.00
Spain	1	0	0	1	0	2	−2	0.00
Venezuela	2	0	1	1	4	5	−1	0.00
Zambia	1	1	0	0	2	0	+2	100.00
Total	11	6	3	2	23	13	+10	54.55

== See also ==
- Italy women's national football team
- Italy women's national under-19 football team
