= Venezuela women's national under-17 football team =

National U-17 association football team

Venezuela Women's U-17
- Nickname: The Powerpuff Girls
- Association: Venezuelan Football Federation
- Confederation: CONMEBOL (South America)
- Head coach: Dayana Frias
- FIFA code: VEN
First colours	Second colours

First international
- Venezuela 2–3 Brazil (Peñalolén, Chile; January 15, 2008)

Biggest win
- Venezuela 8–0 Peru (Barquisimeto, Venezuela; March 03, 2016

Biggest defeat
- Venezuela 0–6 Paraguay (Peñalolén, Chile; January 18, 2008)

South American Under-17 Women's Football Championship
- Appearances: 10 (first in 2008)
- Best result: Champions (2013 & 2016)

FIFA U-17 Women's World Cup
- Appearances: 4 (first in 2010)
- Best result: Fourth place (2014, 2016)

The Venezuelan U-17 women's national football team are the national women's under-17 soccer team of Venezuela. They are controlled by the Federación Venezolana de Fútbol. They have been champions twice, in the 2013 South American Under-17 Women's Championship and 2016 South American Under-17 Women's Football Championship. The Venezuelan U-17 women's national football team, is the only Conmebol's national team of the category, that have qualified to FIFA U-17 Women's World Cup's semifinals.

== Competitive record ==
=== FIFA U-17 Women's World Cup ===
Year	Result	Pld	W	D*	L	GF	GA	Squad
(New Zealand) 2008	Did not qualify							
(Trinidad and Tobago) 2010	Group stage	3	1	0	2	3	9	Squad
(Azerbaijan) 2012	Did not qualify							
(Costa Rica) 2014	Fourth place	6	4	1	1	16	10	Squad
(Jordan) 2016	Fourth place	6	3	0	3	7	11	Squad
(Uruguay) 2018	Did not qualify							
(India) 2022	Did not qualify							
(Dominican Republic) 2024	Did not qualify							
(Morocco) 2025	Did not qualify							
(Morocco) 2026	Quarter-finals	5	2	0	3	4	7	Squad
(Morocco) 2027	To be determined							
(Morocco) 2028	To be determined							
(Morocco) 2029	To be determined							
Total:4/13	Fourth place	20	10	1	9	30	37	–

* Draws include knockout matches decided via penalty shoot-out.

=== South American Championship record ===
South American Championship
Year	Round	Position	GP	W	D	L	GS	GA
(Chile) 2008	Group Stage	9th	4	0	0	4	6	16
(Brazil) 2010	3rd Place	3rd	6	3	1	2	10	10
(Bolivia) 2012	Group Stage	5th	4	2	0	2	7	7
(Paraguay) 2013	1st Place	1st	7	6	1	0	24	7
(Venezuela) 2016	1st Place	1st	7	7	0	0	27	3
(Argentina) 2018	4th Place	4th	7	3	2	2	9	6
(Uruguay) 2022	Group Stage	8th	4	1	0	3	2	11
(Paraguay) 2024	Group Stage	9th	4	0	1	3	0	4
(Colombia) 2025	Group Stage	8th	4	1	2	1	4	6
(Paraguay) 2026	4th Place	4th	7	3	2	2	9	6
Total	10/10	2 Titles	53	26	7	20	95	74

== Head-to-head record ==
The following table shows Venezuela's head-to-head record in the FIFA U-17 Women's World Cup.

Opponent	Pld	W	D	L	GF	GA	GD	Win %
Cameroon	1	1	0	0	2	1	+1	100.00
Canada	2	2	0	0	5	2	+3	100.00
Costa Rica	1	1	0	0	3	0	+3	100.00
France	1	0	0	1	0	2	−2	0.00
Germany	2	1	0	1	2	2	+0	50.00
Italy	2	1	1	0	5	4	+1	50.00
Japan	3	0	0	3	1	12	−11	0.00
Mexico	1	1	0	0	2	1	+1	100.00
New Zealand	1	1	0	0	2	1	+1	100.00
Nigeria	1	0	0	1	0	1	−1	0.00
North Korea	1	0	0	1	0	3	−3	0.00
Spain	2	0	0	2	1	6	−5	0.00
Zambia	2	2	0	0	7	2	+5	100.00
Total	20	10	1	9	30	37	−7	50.00

== See also ==
- Venezuela women's national football team (Senior)
- Football in Venezuela
- 2010 FIFA U-17 Women's World Cup
- 2014 FIFA U-17 Women's World Cup
- 2016 FIFA U-17 Women's World Cup
