= FIFA U-17 Women's World Cup =

- Organiser(s): FIFA
- Founded: 2008; 18 years ago
- Region: International
- Teams: 24 (finals)
- Related competitions: FIFA U-17 World Cup; FIFA U-20 Women's World Cup
- Current champions: Nigeria (1st title)
- Most championships: North Korea (4 titles)
- Website: fifa.com/u17womensworldcup
- 2026 FIFA U-17 Women's World Cup

The FIFA U-17 Women's World Cup is an annual (biennial until 2024) international women's association football tournament for female players under the age of 17. It is organized by Fédération Internationale de Football Association (FIFA) since 2008. The current champions are Nigeria (The Flamingos), who won it for the first time at the 2026 edition, held in Morocco.

== History ==
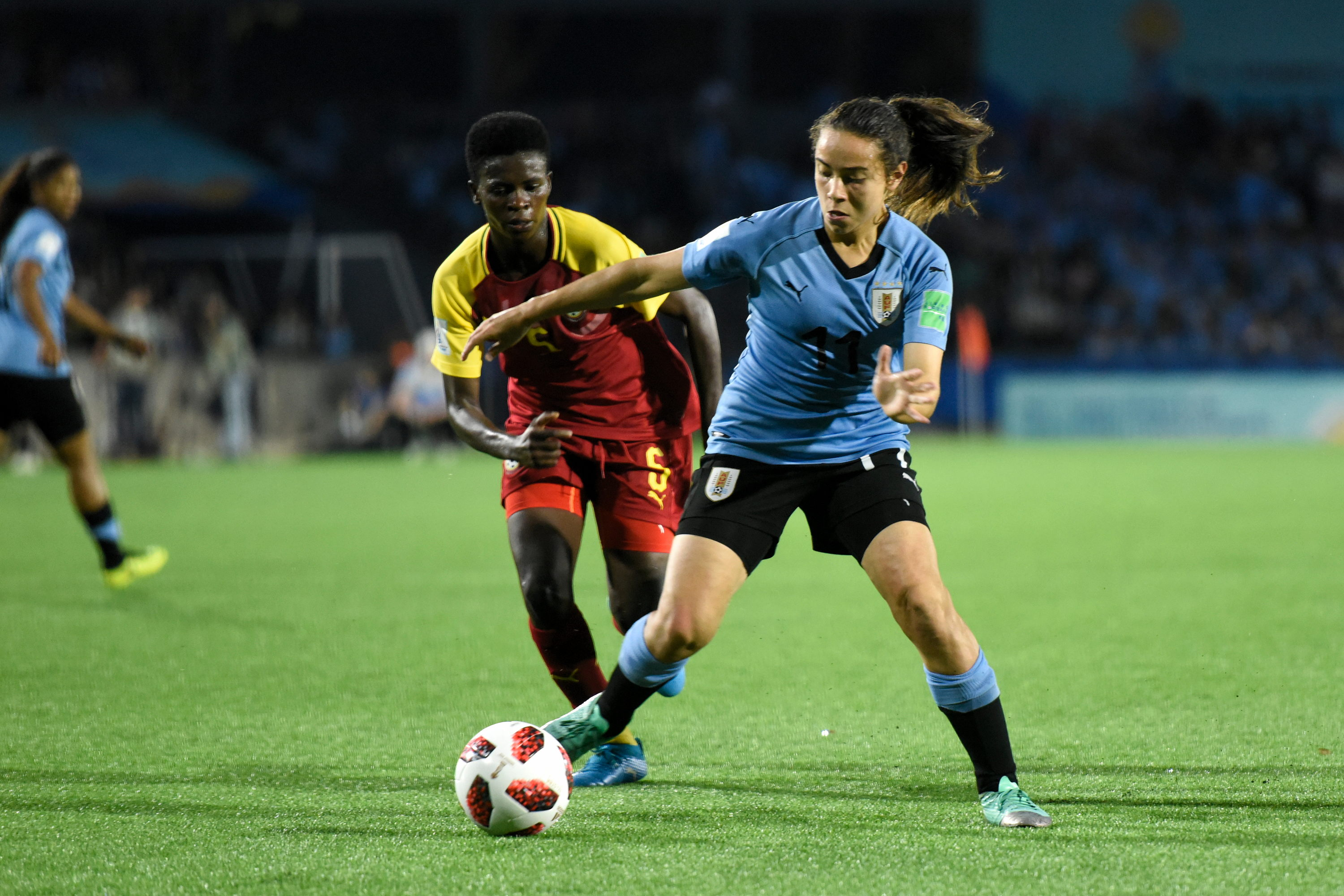
The opening match between Uruguay and Ghana at the 2018 edition which Ghana won 5–0

In 2003, after the inaugural success of the 2002 FIFA U-19 Women's World Championship, held in Canada, FIFA proposed adding a second youth tournament for girls. Continental confederations told FIFA it would be difficult to create a second championship, with the age limits in place at the time. Therefore, FIFA created the U-17 Women's World Cup and the U-20 Women's World Championship (renamed the "U-20 Women's World Cup" in 2007), the same age groups as its men's youth tournaments. Accordingly, the age limit for the U-19 championship was increased to 20, effective with the 2006 FIFA U-20 Women's World Championship in Russia. FIFA committed to creating a U-17 women's championship, stated to begin in 2008.

The first tournament was held in 2008 in New Zealand from 28 October to 16 November. Four cities hosted matches during the inaugural tournament – North Shore City (North Harbour Stadium), Hamilton (Waikato Stadium), Wellington (Wellington Stadium) and Christchurch (Queen Elizabeth II Park). New Zealand won hosting rights at the same time that Chile received hosting honours for the 2008 FIFA U-20 Women's World Cup.

On 4 April 2020, FIFA announced the decision of postponing the 2020 World Cup which was originally scheduled in five venues to be held from 2 to 21 November in India. The tournament was initially postponed to 2021, subject to further monitoring. On 17 November 2020, FIFA announced that the 2020 edition of the tournament would be cancelled, and India were appointed as hosts of the next edition of the tournament in 2022. However, on 16 August 2022, India were stripped of their hosting rights for 2022 as the All India Football Federation was suspended by FIFA. The rights were given back to India on 26 August 2022 as the AIFF was reinstated by FIFA.

Dominican Republic was selected as host for the 2024 edition on 23 June 2023.

Starting from 2025 the U-17 Women's World Cup and its men's counterpart are held annually. Morocco was selected on 14 March 2024 to host the 2025–2029 editions, becoming the first African country to stage the tournament.

== Qualification ==
Qualifying tournaments are:

| Confederation | Championship |
|---|---|
| AFC (Asia) | AFC U-17 Women's Asian Cup |
| CAF (Africa) | African U-17 Women's World Cup qualification |
| CONCACAF (North, Central America and Caribbean) | CONCACAF Women’s U-17 qualifiers |
| CONMEBOL (South America) | CONMEBOL Sub 17 Femenino |
| OFC (Oceania) | OFC U-16 Women's Championship |
| UEFA (Europe) | UEFA Women's U-17 Championship |

== Results ==
| Ed. | Year | Hosts | Final | | | Third place match | | | Num. teams |
| Ed. | Year | Hosts | (gold) Champions | Score | (silver) Runners-up | (bronze) Third place | Score | Fourth place | Num. teams |
|---|---|---|---|---|---|---|---|---|---|
| 1 | 2008 | New Zealand | North Korea | 2–1 (a.e.t.) | United States | Germany | 3–0 | England | 16 |
| 2 | 2010 | Trinidad and Tobago | South Korea | 3–3 (a.e.t.) (5–4 p) | Japan | Spain | 1–0 | North Korea | 16 |
| 3 | 2012 | Azerbaijan | France | 1–1 (7–6 p) | North Korea | Ghana | 1–0 | Germany | 16 |
| 4 | 2014 | Costa Rica | Japan | 2–0 | Spain | Italy | 4–4 (2–0 p) | Venezuela | 16 |
| 5 | 2016 | Jordan | North Korea | 0–0 (5–4 p) | Japan | Spain | 4–0 | Venezuela | 16 |
| 6 | 2018 | Uruguay | Spain | 2–1 | Mexico | New Zealand | 2–1 | Canada | 16 |
| 7 | 2022 | India | Spain | 1–0 | Colombia | Nigeria | 3–3 (3–2 p) | Germany | 16 |
| 8 | 2024 | Dominican Republic | North Korea | 1–1 (4–3 p) | Spain | United States | 3–0 | England | 16 |
| 9 | 2025 | Morocco | North Korea | 3–0 | Netherlands | Mexico | 1–1 (3–1 p) | Brazil | 24 |
| 10 | 2026 | Morocco | Nigeria | 2–1 | Japan | North Korea | 6–0 | Brazil | 24 |
| 11 | 2027 | Morocco | | | | | | | 24 |
| 12 | 2028 | Morocco | | | | | | | |
| 13 | 2029 | Morocco | | | | | | | |

Map of countries' best results

== Debut of national teams ==
| Year | Debuting teams | | |
| Year | Teams | No. | Cum. |
|---|---|---|---|
| 2008 | Brazil, Canada, Colombia, Costa Rica, Denmark, England, France, Germany, Ghana, Japan, New Zealand, Nigeria, North Korea, Paraguay, South Korea, United States | 16 | 16 |
| 2010 | Chile, Mexico, Republic of Ireland, South Africa, Spain, Trinidad and Tobago, Venezuela | 7 | 23 |
| 2012 | Azerbaijan, China, Gambia, Uruguay | 4 | 27 |
| 2014 | Italy, Zambia | 2 | 29 |
| 2016 | Cameroon, Jordan | 2 | 31 |
| 2018 | Finland | 1 | 32 |
| 2022 | India, Morocco, Tanzania | 3 | 35 |
| 2024 | Dominican Republic, Ecuador, Kenya, Poland | 4 | 39 |
| 2025 | Ivory Coast, Netherlands, Norway, Samoa | 4 | 43 |
| 2026 | Argentina, Australia, Puerto Rico | 3 | 46 |
| 2027 | New Caledonia | 1 | 47 |

== Overall team records ==
In this ranking 3 points are awarded for a win, 1 for a draw and 0 for a loss. As per statistical convention in football, matches decided in extra time are counted as wins and losses, while matches decided by penalty shoot-outs are counted as draws. Teams are ranked by total points, then by goal difference, then by goals scored.

As of 2026 FIFA U-17 Women's World Cup

| Rank | Team | Part | Pld | W | D | L | GF | GA | GD | Points |
|---|---|---|---|---|---|---|---|---|---|---|
| 1 | Japan | 10 | 51 | 35 | 10 | 5 | 151 | 38 | +113 | 115 |
| 2 | North Korea | 9 | 51 | 34 | 11 | 6 | 130 | 42 | +88 | 113 |
| 3 | Spain | 8 | 44 | 33 | 5 | 6 | 105 | 29 | +76 | 104 |
| 4 | Nigeria | 9 | 39 | 21 | 7 | 11 | 80 | 48 | +32 | 70 |
| 5 | Germany | 8 | 37 | 21 | 5 | 11 | 92 | 40 | +48 | 68 |
| 6 | United States | 8 | 34 | 18 | 6 | 10 | 100 | 41 | +59 | 60 |
| 7 | Canada | 9 | 35 | 14 | 9 | 12 | 51 | 48 | +3 | 51 |
| 8 | Brazil | 9 | 38 | 14 | 9 | 15 | 58 | 57 | +1 | 51 |
| 9 | Mexico | 9 | 37 | 14 | 6 | 17 | 48 | 61 | –13 | 48 |
| 10 | Ghana | 7 | 29 | 14 | 5 | 10 | 43 | 35 | +8 | 47 |
| 11 | Venezuela | 4 | 20 | 10 | 1 | 9 | 30 | 37 | –7 | 31 |
| 12 | France | 5 | 21 | 7 | 9 | 5 | 35 | 27 | +8 | 30 |
| 13 | China | 5 | 18 | 8 | 2 | 8 | 36 | 26 | +10 | 26 |
| 14 | Colombia | 7 | 25 | 6 | 6 | 13 | 24 | 39 | –15 | 24 |
| 15 | South Korea | 5 | 19 | 6 | 4 | 9 | 29 | 46 | –17 | 22 |
| 16 | Italy | 2 | 11 | 6 | 3 | 2 | 23 | 13 | +10 | 21 |
| 17 | England | 3 | 16 | 5 | 4 | 7 | 20 | 31 | –11 | 19 |
| 18 | New Zealand | 10 | 33 | 5 | 3 | 25 | 26 | 82 | –56 | 18 |
| 19 | Poland | 2 | 8 | 3 | 3 | 2 | 14 | 13 | +1 | 12 |
| 20 | Ecuador | 2 | 7 | 3 | 0 | 4 | 8 | 16 | –8 | 9 |
| 21 | Morocco | 3 | 11 | 3 | 0 | 8 | 15 | 33 | –18 | 9 |
| 22 | Netherlands | 1 | 7 | 2 | 2 | 3 | 8 | 15 | –7 | 8 |
| 23 | Paraguay | 4 | 13 | 2 | 2 | 9 | 15 | 50 | –35 | 8 |
| 24 | Argentina | 1 | 4 | 2 | 1 | 1 | 9 | 4 | +5 | 7 |
| 25 | Republic of Ireland | 1 | 4 | 2 | 0 | 2 | 6 | 4 | +2 | 6 |
| 26 | Kenya | 2 | 7 | 2 | 0 | 5 | 8 | 18 | –10 | 6 |
| 27 | Zambia | 4 | 13 | 2 | 0 | 11 | 19 | 33 | –14 | 6 |
| 28 | Denmark | 1 | 4 | 1 | 2 | 1 | 3 | 6 | –3 | 5 |
| 29 | Tanzania | 1 | 4 | 1 | 1 | 2 | 3 | 9 | –6 | 4 |
| 30 | Chile | 3 | 9 | 1 | 1 | 7 | 8 | 26 | –18 | 4 |
| 31 | Trinidad and Tobago | 1 | 3 | 1 | 0 | 2 | 3 | 4 | –1 | 3 |
| 32 | Cameroon | 3 | 9 | 1 | 0 | 8 | 9 | 19 | –10 | 3 |
| 33 | Norway | 2 | 6 | 1 | 0 | 5 | 5 | 18 | –13 | 3 |
| 34 | Australia | 1 | 3 | 0 | 1 | 2 | 2 | 5 | –3 | 1 |
| 34 | Finland | 1 | 3 | 0 | 1 | 2 | 2 | 5 | –3 | 1 |
| 36 | Dominican Republic | 1 | 3 | 0 | 1 | 2 | 1 | 4 | –3 | 1 |
| 37 | Ivory Coast | 1 | 3 | 0 | 1 | 2 | 1 | 7 | –6 | 1 |
| 38 | Costa Rica | 3 | 9 | 0 | 1 | 8 | 4 | 21 | –17 | 1 |
| 39 | Uruguay | 2 | 6 | 0 | 1 | 5 | 4 | 22 | –18 | 1 |
| 40 | South Africa | 2 | 6 | 0 | 1 | 5 | 3 | 27 | –24 | 1 |
| 41 | Puerto Rico | 1 | 3 | 0 | 0 | 3 | 2 | 14 | –12 | 0 |
| 42 | Jordan | 1 | 3 | 0 | 0 | 3 | 1 | 15 | –14 | 0 |
| 43 | Azerbaijan | 1 | 3 | 0 | 0 | 3 | 0 | 16 | –16 | 0 |
| 43 | India | 1 | 3 | 0 | 0 | 3 | 0 | 16 | –16 | 0 |
| 45 | Gambia | 1 | 3 | 0 | 0 | 3 | 2 | 27 | –25 | 0 |
| 46 | Samoa | 2 | 6 | 0 | 0 | 6 | 2 | 42 | –40 | 0 |
| 47 | New Caledonia | 1 | 0 | 0 | 0 | 0 | 0 | 0 | 0 | 0 |

== Teams reaching the top four ==
| Team | Title(s) | Runners-up | Third place | Fourth place |
|---|---|---|---|---|
| North Korea | 4 (2008, 2016, 2024, 2025) | 1 (2012) | 1 (2026) | 1 (2010) |
| Spain | 2 (2018, 2022) | 2 (2014, 2024) | 2 (2010, 2016) | — |
| Japan | 1 (2014) | 3 (2010, 2016, 2026) | — | — |
| Nigeria | 1 (2026) | — | 1 (2022) | — |
| South Korea | 1 (2010) | — | — | — |
| France | 1 (2012) | — | — | — |
| United States | — | 1 (2008) | 1 (2024) | — |
| Mexico | — | 1 (2018) | 1 (2025) | — |
| Colombia | — | 1 (2022) | — | — |
| Netherlands | — | 1 (2025) | — | — |
| Germany | — | — | 1 (2008) | 2 (2012, 2022) |
| Ghana | — | — | 1 (2012) | — |
| Italy | — | — | 1 (2014) | — |
| New Zealand | — | — | 1 (2018) | — |
| Venezuela | — | — | — | 2 (2014, 2016) |
| England | — | — | — | 2 (2008, 2024) |
| Brazil | — | — | — | 2 (2025, 2026) |
| Canada | — | — | — | 1 (2018) |

== Comprehensive team results by tournament ==
Legend

- 1st – Champions
- 2nd – Runners-up
- 3rd – Third place
- 4th – Fourth place
- QF – Quarter-finalists
- R2 – Round 2 (since 2025, round of 16)
- R1 – Round 1 (group stage)
- • – Did not qualify
- × – Did not enter / Withdrew / Banned
- XX – Country did not exist or national team was inactive
- – Hosts
- Q – Qualified for upcoming tournament

For each tournament, the flag of the host country and the number of teams in each finals tournament (in brackets) are shown.

| Team | Confederation | (New Zealand) 2008 (16) | (Trinidad and Tobago) 2010 (16) | (Azerbaijan) 2012 (16) | (Costa Rica) 2014 (16) | (Jordan) 2016 (16) | (Uruguay) 2018 (16) | (India) 2022 (16) | (Dominican Republic) 2024 (16) | (Morocco) 2025 (24) | (Morocco) 2026 (24) | (Morocco) 2027 (24) | Total |
|---|---|---|---|---|---|---|---|---|---|---|---|---|---|
| Argentina | CONMEBOL | • | • | • | • | • | • | • | • | • | R2 | | 1 |
| Australia | AFC | • | • | • | • | • | • | • | • | • | R1 | | 1 |
| Azerbaijan | UEFA | • | • | R1 | • | • | • | • | • | • | • | | 1 |
| Brazil | CONMEBOL | R1 | QF | QF | • | R1 | R1 | QF | R1 | 4th | 4th | | 9 |
| Cameroon | CAF | • | × | • | × | R1 | R1 | • | • | R1 | • | | 3 |
| Canada | CONCACAF | QF | R1 | QF | QF | R1 | 4th | R1 | • | QF | R1 | | 9 |
| Chile | CONMEBOL | • | R1 | • | • | • | • | R1 | • | • | R1 | | 3 |
| China | AFC | • | • | R1 | R1 | • | • | R1 | • | R2 | QF | | 5 |
| Colombia | CONMEBOL | R1 | • | R1 | R1 | • | R1 | 2nd | R1 | R2 | • | | 7 |
| Costa Rica | CONCACAF | R1 | • | • | R1 | • | • | • | • | R1 | • | | 3 |
| Denmark | UEFA | QF | • | • | • | • | • | • | • | • | • | | 1 |
| Dominican Republic | CONCACAF | × | × | • | • | • | • | • | R1 | • | • | | 1 |
| Ecuador | CONMEBOL | • | • | • | • | • | • | • | QF | R1 | • | | 2 |
| England | UEFA | 4th | • | • | • | QF | • | • | 4th | • | • | | 3 |
| Finland | UEFA | • | • | • | • | • | R1 | • | • | • | • | | 1 |
| France | UEFA | R1 | • | 1st | • | • | • | R1 | • | QF | R2 | | 5 |
| Gambia | CAF | × | × | R1 | × | × | • | × | × | × | × | | 1 |
| Germany | UEFA | 3rd | QF | 4th | R1 | QF | QF | 4th | • | • | R2 | | 8 |
| Ghana | CAF | R1 | R1 | 3rd | QF | QF | QF | • | × | × | QF | | 7 |
| India | AFC | • | • | • | • | • | • | R1 | • | • | • | | 1 |
| Italy | UEFA | • | • | • | 3rd | • | • | • | • | QF | • | | 2 |
| Ivory Coast | CAF | × | × | × | × | × | × | × | × | R1 | • | | 1 |
| Japan | AFC | QF | 2nd | QF | 1st | 2nd | QF | QF | QF | QF | 2nd | | 10 |
| Jordan | AFC | • | • | • | • | R1 | • | • | • | • | • | | 1 |
| Kenya | CAF | × | × | • | × | × | × | × | R1 | • | R2 | | 2 |
| Mexico | CONCACAF | • | R1 | R1 | QF | QF | 2nd | R1 | R1 | 3rd | R2 | | 9 |
| Morocco | CAF | × | × | × | × | • | • | R1 | • | R2 | R2 | Q | 4 |
| Netherlands | UEFA | • | • | • | • | • | • | • | • | 2nd | • | | 1 |
| New Caledonia | OFC | • | • | • | • | • | • | • | • | • | • | Q | 1 |
| New Zealand | OFC | R1 | R1 | R1 | R1 | R1 | 3rd | R1 | R1 | R1 | R1 | Q | 11 |
| Nigeria | CAF | R1 | QF | QF | QF | R1 | • | 3rd | QF | R2 | 1st | | 9 |
| North Korea | AFC | 1st | 4th | 2nd | R1 | 1st | QF | × | 1st | 1st | 3rd | | 9 |
| Norway | UEFA | • | • | • | • | • | • | • | • | R1 | R1 | | 2 |
| Paraguay | CONMEBOL | R1 | • | • | R1 | R1 | • | • | • | R2 | • | | 4 |
| Poland | UEFA | • | • | • | • | • | • | • | QF | • | R2 | | 2 |
| Puerto Rico | CONCACAF | • | • | × | • | • | • | • | • | • | R1 | | 1 |
| Republic of Ireland | UEFA | • | QF | • | • | • | • | • | • | • | • | | 1 |
| Samoa | OFC | × | × | × | × | • | • | • | × | R1 | R1 | • | 2 |
| South Africa | CAF | • | R1 | • | • | • | R1 | • | • | • | • | | 2 |
| South Korea | AFC | QF | 1st | • | • | • | R1 | • | R1 | R1 | • | | 5 |
| Spain | UEFA | • | 3rd | • | 2nd | 3rd | 1st | 1st | 2nd | R2 | R2 | | 8 |
| Tanzania | CAF | × | × | × | × | × | × | QF | • | • | • | | 1 |
| Trinidad and Tobago | CONCACAF | • | R1 | • | • | • | • | • | • | • | • | | 1 |
| United States | CONCACAF | 2nd | • | R1 | • | R1 | R1 | QF | 3rd | R2 | QF | | 8 |
| Uruguay | CONMEBOL | • | • | R1 | • | • | R1 | • | • | • | • | | 2 |
| Venezuela | CONMEBOL | • | R1 | • | 4th | 4th | • | • | • | • | QF | | 4 |
| Zambia | CAF | • | × | • | R1 | × | • | • | R1 | R2 | R1 | | 4 |

== Results by confederation ==
— Hosting confederation

=== Overview ===
| Confederation | 1st | 2nd | 3rd | 4th | Top 8 | Top 16 |
|---|---|---|---|---|---|---|
| AFC | 6 | 3 | 1 | 1 | 21 | 6 |
| UEFA | 3 | 3 | 4 | 4 | 23 | 8 |
| CAF | 1 | 0 | 2 | 0 | 12 | 7 |
| CONCACAF | 0 | 2 | 2 | 1 | 13 | 5 |
| CONMEBOL | 0 | 1 | 0 | 4 | 10 | 6 |
| OFC | 0 | 0 | 1 | 0 | 1 | 0 |

=== AFC ===
| | 2008 (New Zealand) (16) | 2010 (Trinidad and Tobago) (16) | 2012 (Azerbaijan) (16) | 2014 (Costa Rica) (16) | 2016 (Jordan) (16) | 2018 (Uruguay) (16) | 2022 (India) (16) | 2024 (Dominican Republic) (16) | 2025 (Morocco) (24) | 2026 (Morocco) (24) | Total |
|---|---|---|---|---|---|---|---|---|---|---|---|
| Teams | 3 | 3 | 3 | 3 | 3 | 3 | 3 | 3 | 4 | 4 | 32 |
| Top 16 | — | — | — | — | — | — | — | — | 3 | 3 | 6 |
| Top 8 | 3 | 3 | 2 | 1 | 2 | 2 | 1 | 2 | 2 | 3 | 21 |
| Top 4 | 1 | 3 | 1 | 1 | 2 | 0 | 0 | 1 | 1 | 2 | 12 |
| Top 2 | 1 | 2 | 1 | 1 | 2 | 0 | 0 | 1 | 1 | 1 | 10 |
| 1st | (North Korea) | (South Korea) | | (Japan) | (North Korea) | | | (North Korea) | (North Korea) | | 6 |
| 2nd | | (Japan) | (North Korea) | | (Japan) | | | | | (Japan) | 4 |
| 3rd | | | | | | | | | | (North Korea) | 1 |
| 4th | | (North Korea) | | | | | | | | | 1 |

=== CAF ===
| | 2008 (New Zealand) (16) | 2010 (Trinidad and Tobago) (16) | 2012 (Azerbaijan) (16) | 2014 (Costa Rica) (16) | 2016 (Jordan) (16) | 2018 (Uruguay) (16) | 2022 (India) (16) | 2024 (Dominican Republic) (16) | 2025 (Morocco) (24) | 2026 (Morocco) (24) | Total |
|---|---|---|---|---|---|---|---|---|---|---|---|
| Teams | 2 | 3 | 3 | 3 | 3 | 3 | 3 | 3 | 5 | 5 | 33 |
| Top 16 | — | — | — | — | — | — | — | — | 3 | 4 | 7 |
| Top 8 | 0 | 1 | 2 | 2 | 1 | 1 | 2 | 1 | 0 | 2 | 12 |
| Top 4 | 0 | 0 | 1 | 0 | 0 | 0 | 1 | 0 | 0 | 1 | 3 |
| Top 2 | 0 | 0 | 0 | 0 | 0 | 0 | 0 | 0 | 0 | 1 | 1 |
| 1st | | | | | | | | | | (Nigeria) | 1 |
| 2nd | | | | | | | | | | | 0 |
| 3rd | | | (Ghana) | | | | (Nigeria) | | | | 2 |
| 4th | | | | | | | | | | | 0 |

=== CONCACAF ===
| | 2008 (New Zealand) (16) | 2010 (Trinidad and Tobago) (16) | 2012 (Azerbaijan) (16) | 2014 (Costa Rica) (16) | 2016 (Jordan) (16) | 2018 (Uruguay) (16) | 2022 (India) (16) | 2024 (Dominican Republic) (16) | 2025 (Morocco) (24) | 2026 (Morocco) (24) | Total |
|---|---|---|---|---|---|---|---|---|---|---|---|
| Teams | 3 | 3 | 3 | 3 | 3 | 3 | 3 | 3 | 4 | 4 | 32 |
| Top 16 | — | — | — | — | — | — | — | — | 3 | 2 | 5 |
| Top 8 | 2 | 0 | 1 | 2 | 1 | 2 | 1 | 1 | 2 | 1 | 13 |
| Top 4 | 1 | 0 | 0 | 0 | 0 | 2 | 0 | 1 | 1 | 0 | 5 |
| Top 2 | 1 | 0 | 0 | 0 | 0 | 1 | 0 | 0 | 0 | 0 | 2 |
| 1st | | | | | | | | | | | 0 |
| 2nd | (United States) | | | | | (Mexico) | | | | | 2 |
| 3rd | | | | | | | | (United States) | (Mexico) | | 2 |
| 4th | | | | | | (Canada) | | | | | 1 |

=== CONMEBOL ===
| | 2008 (New Zealand) (16) | 2010 (Trinidad and Tobago) (16) | 2012 (Azerbaijan) (16) | 2014 (Costa Rica) (16) | 2016 (Jordan) (16) | 2018 (Uruguay) (16) | 2022 (India) (16) | 2024 (Dominican Republic) (16) | 2025 (Morocco) (24) | 2026 (Morocco) (24) | Total |
|---|---|---|---|---|---|---|---|---|---|---|---|
| Teams | 3 | 3 | 3 | 3 | 3 | 3 | 3 | 3 | 4 | 4 | 32 |
| Top 16 | — | — | — | — | — | — | — | — | 3 | 3 | 6 |
| Top 8 | 0 | 1 | 1 | 1 | 1 | 0 | 2 | 1 | 1 | 2 | 10 |
| Top 4 | 0 | 0 | 0 | 1 | 1 | 0 | 1 | 0 | 1 | 1 | 5 |
| Top 2 | 0 | 0 | 0 | 0 | 0 | 0 | 1 | 0 | 0 | 0 | 1 |
| 1st | | | | | | | | | | | 0 |
| 2nd | | | | | | | (Colombia) | | | | 1 |
| 3rd | | | | | | | | | | | 0 |
| 4th | | | | (Venezuela) | (Venezuela) | | | | (Brazil) | (Brazil) | 4 |

=== OFC ===
| | 2008 (New Zealand) (16) | 2010 (Trinidad and Tobago) (16) | 2012 (Azerbaijan) (16) | 2014 (Costa Rica) (16) | 2016 (Jordan) (16) | 2018 (Uruguay) (16) | 2022 (India) (16) | 2024 (Dominican Republic) (16) | 2025 (Morocco) (24) | 2026 (Morocco) (24) | Total |
|---|---|---|---|---|---|---|---|---|---|---|---|
| Teams | 1 | 1 | 1 | 1 | 1 | 1 | 1 | 1 | 2 | 2 | 12 |
| Top 16 | — | — | — | — | — | — | — | — | 0 | 0 | 0 |
| Top 8 | 0 | 0 | 0 | 0 | 0 | 1 | 0 | 0 | 0 | 0 | 1 |
| Top 4 | 0 | 0 | 0 | 0 | 0 | 1 | 0 | 0 | 0 | 0 | 1 |
| Top 2 | 0 | 0 | 0 | 0 | 0 | 0 | 0 | 0 | 0 | 0 | 0 |
| 1st | | | | | | | | | | | 0 |
| 2nd | | | | | | | | | | | 0 |
| 3rd | | | | | | (New Zealand) | | | | | 1 |
| 4th | | | | | | | | | | | 0 |

=== UEFA ===
| | 2008 (New Zealand) (16) | 2010 (Trinidad and Tobago) (16) | 2012 (Azerbaijan) (16) | 2014 (Costa Rica) (16) | 2016 (Jordan) (16) | 2018 (Uruguay) (16) | 2022 (India) (16) | 2024 (Dominican Republic) (16) | 2025 (Morocco) (24) | 2026 (Morocco) (24) | Total |
|---|---|---|---|---|---|---|---|---|---|---|---|
| Teams | 4 | 3 | 3 | 3 | 3 | 3 | 3 | 3 | 5 | 5 | 35 |
| Top 16 | — | — | — | — | — | — | — | — | 4 | 4 | 8 |
| Top 8 | 3 | 3 | 2 | 2 | 3 | 2 | 2 | 3 | 3 | 0 | 23 |
| Top 4 | 2 | 1 | 2 | 2 | 1 | 1 | 2 | 2 | 1 | 0 | 14 |
| Top 2 | 0 | 0 | 1 | 1 | 0 | 1 | 1 | 1 | 1 | 0 | 6 |
| 1st | | | (France) | | | (Spain) | (Spain) | | | | 3 |
| 2nd | | | | (Spain) | | | | (Spain) | (Netherlands) | | 3 |
| 3rd | (Germany) | (Spain) | | (Italy) | (Spain) | | | | | | 4 |
| 4th | (England) | | (Germany) | | | | (Germany) | (England) | | | 4 |

== Awards ==
| Tournament | Golden Ball | Golden Boot | Goals | Golden Glove | FIFA Fair Play Trophy |
|---|---|---|---|---|---|
| New Zealand 2008 | (Japan) Mana Iwabuchi | (Germany) Dzsenifer Marozsán | 6 | (United States) Taylor Vancil | Germany |
| Trinidad and Tobago 2010 | (South Korea) Yeo Min-ji | (South Korea) Yeo Min-ji | 8 | (Spain) Dolores Gallardo | Germany |
| Azerbaijan 2012 | (France) Griedge Mbock Bathy | (North Korea) Ri Un-sim | 8 | (France) Romane Bruneau | Japan |
| Costa Rica 2014 | (Japan) Hina Sugita | (Venezuela) Deyna Castellanos (Venezuela) Gabriela García | 6 | (Japan) Mamiko Matsumoto | Japan |
| Jordan 2016 | (Japan) Fuka Nagano | (Spain) Lorena Navarro | 8 | (Spain) Noelia Ramos | Japan |
| Uruguay 2018 | (Spain) Clàudia Pina | (Ghana) Mukarama Abdulai | 7 | (Spain) Catalina Coll | Japan |
| India 2022 | (Spain) Vicky López | (Germany) Loreen Bender | 4 | (Spain) Sofía Fuente | Japan |
| Dominican Republic 2024 | (North Korea) Jon Il-chong | (Spain) Pau Comendador | 5 | (United States) Evan O'Steen | Nigeria |
| Morocco 2025 | (North Korea) Yu Jong-hyang | (North Korea) Yu Jong-hyang | 8 | (Mexico) Valentina Murrieta | Spain |
| Morocco 2026 | (Nigeria) Oluebube Umejiaku | (United States) Maddie DiMaria | 12 | (North Korea) Kim Son-gyong | Japan |

== See also ==
- FIFA Women's World Cup
- FIFA U-17 World Cup
- FIFA U-20 Women's World Cup
