= 2008 South American U-17 Women's Championship =

2008 South American Under-17 Women's Championship
Sudamericano Femenino Sub 17

Tournament details
- Host country: Chile
- Dates: 12–30 January
- Teams: 10 (from 1 confederation)
- Venue: 3 (in 3 host cities)

Final positions
- Champions: Colombia (1st title)
- Runners-up: Brazil
- Third place: Paraguay
- Fourth place: Argentina

Tournament statistics
- Matches played: 26
- Goals scored: 107 (4.12 per match)
- Top scorer(s): (Paraguay) Karen Ruíz Díaz (7 goals)

The 2008 South American Under-17 Women's Championship was the inaugural edition of the South American Under-17 Women's Championship. It was held from 12 to 30 January 2008 in Melipilla, Peñalolén and Villarrica, Chile.

== First round ==
=== Group A ===
Team	Pld	W	D	L	GF	GA	GD	Pts
Argentina	4	3	0	1	10	4	+6	9
Colombia	4	2	2	0	10	2	+8	8
Chile	4	1	2	1	6	6	0	5
Ecuador	4	1	2	1	4	4	0	5
Bolivia	4	0	0	4	2	15	−13	0

12 January 2008
19:05

Chile	1–1	Ecuador

Estadio Roberto Bravo Santibañez, Melipilla
Referee: Alejandra Trucidos, (Uruguay)

12 January 2008
21:05

Argentina	5–1	Bolivia

Estadio Roberto Bravo Santibañez, Melipilla
Referee: Silvia Reyes, (Peru)

14 January 2008
19:05

Chile	4–0	Bolivia

Estadio Roberto Bravo Santibañez, Melipilla
Referee: Claudia Ortega, (Paraguay)

14 January 2008
21:05

Ecuador	1–1	Colombia

Estadio Roberto Bravo Santibañez, Melipilla
Referee: Gabriela Bandeira, (Uruguay)

17 January 2008
19:05

Bolivia	1–2	Ecuador

Estadio Roberto Bravo Santibañez, Melipilla
Referee: Alejandra Trucidos, (Uruguay)

17 January 2008
21:05

Argentina	0–3	Colombia

Estadio Roberto Bravo Santibañez, Melipilla
Referee: Norma González, (Paraguay)

19 January 2008
19:05

Chile	1–1	Colombia

Estadio Roberto Bravo Santibañez, Melipilla
Referee: Claudia Ortega, (Paraguay)

19 January 2008
21:05

Argentina	1–0	Ecuador

Estadio Roberto Bravo Santibañez, Melipilla
Referee: Gabriela Bandera, (Uruguay)

22 January 2008
19:05

Chile	0–4	Argentina

Estadio Roberto Bravo Santibañez, Melipilla
Referee: Silvia Reyes, (Peru)

22 January 2008
21:05

Bolivia	0–5	Colombia

Estadio Roberto Bravo Santibañez, Melipilla
Referee: Norma González, (Paraguay)

=== Group B ===
Team	Pld	W	D	L	GF	GA	GD	Pts
Brazil	4	4	0	0	12	3	+9	12
Paraguay	4	3	0	1	15	7	+8	9
Peru	4	2	0	2	5	9	−4	6
Uruguay	4	1	0	3	5	8	−3	3
Venezuela	4	0	0	4	6	16	−10	0

13 January 2008
19:05

Peru	1–4	Paraguay

Complejo Deportivo del Banco Santander, Peñalolén
Referee: Carolina González, (Chile)

13 January 2008
21:05

Brazil	1–0	Uruguay

Complejo Deportivo del Banco Santander, Peñalolén
Referee: Adriana Correa, (Colombia)

15 January 2008
19:05

Uruguay	1–4	Paraguay

Complejo Deportivo del Banco Santander, Peñalolén
Referee: Jésica Di Iorio, (Argentina)

15 January 2008
21:05

Venezuela	2–3	Brazil

Complejo Deportivo del Banco Santander, Peñalolén
Referee: Karina Triviño, (Ecuador)

18 January 2008
19:05

Peru	1–0	Uruguay

Complejo Deportivo del Banco Santander, Peñalolén
Referee: Carolina González, (Chile)

18 January 2008
21:05

Venezuela	0–6	Paraguay

Complejo Deportivo del Banco Santander, Peñalolén
Referee: Jésica Di Iorio, (Argentina)

20 January 2008
19:05

Peru	3–2	Venezuela

Complejo Deportivo del Banco Santander, Peñalolén
Referee: Karina Triviño, (Ecuador)

20 January 2008
21:05

Brazil	5–1	Paraguay

Complejo Deportivo del Banco Santander, Peñalolén
Referee: Adriana Correa, (Colombia)

23 January 2008
19:05

Uruguay	4–2	Venezuela

Complejo Deportivo del Banco Santander, Peñalolén
Referee: Shirley Cornejo, (Bolivia)

23 January 2008
21:05

Brazil	3–0	Peru

Complejo Deportivo del Banco Santander, Peñalolén
Referee: Jesica di Iorio, (Argentina)

== Final round ==
Team	Pld	W	D	L	GF	GA	GD	Pts
Colombia	3	2	0	1	12	6	+6	6
Brazil	3	2	0	1	8	7	+1	6
Paraguay	3	1	0	2	7	10	−3	3
Argentina	3	1	0	2	5	9	−4	3

26 January 2008
20:05

Argentina	2–1	Paraguay

Estadio Municipal, Villarrica
Referee: Karina Triviño, (Ecuador)

26 January 2008
22:05

Brazil	3–1	Colombia

Estadio Municipal, Villarrica
Referee: Silvia Reyes, (Peru)

28 January 2008
19:05

Argentina	1–4	Colombia

Estadio Municipal, Villarrica
Referee: Shirley Cornejo, (Bolivia)

28 January 2008
21:05

Brazil	1–4	Paraguay

Estadio Municipal, Villarrica
Referee: Alejandra Trucidos, (Uruguay)

30 January 2008
20:05

Argentina	2–4	Brazil

Estadio Municipal, Villarrica

30 January 2008
22:05

Colombia	7–2	Paraguay

Estadio Municipal, Villarrica
Referee: Carolina González, (Chile)

2008 Women's Under-17 South American champions

Colombia
First title
