= Ecuador women's national under-17 football team =

National youth association football team

Ecuador
- Nickname: La Tricolor (The Tricolor)
- Association: Federación Ecuador de Fútbol
- Confederation: CONMEBOL (South America)
- Head coach: Eduardo Moscoso
- FIFA code: ECU

First international
- Chile 1–1 Ecuador (Melipilla, Chile; 12 January 2008)

Biggest win
- Ecuador 8–0 Bolivia (Palmira, Colombia; 7 May 2025)

Biggest defeat
- Ecuador 0–15 Brazil (São Paulo, Brazil; 2 February 2010)

South American Under-17 Women's Football Championship
- Appearances: 7 (first in 2008)
- Best result: Third place (2024)

FIFA U-17 Women's World Cup
- Appearances: 2 (first in 2024)
- Best result: Quarter-finals (2024)

The Ecuador U-17 women's national football team is an international youth football team. Its primary role is the development of players in preparation for the Ecuador women's national football team.

Ecuador will make their FIFA U-17 Women's World Cup debut in 2024 to be hosted by the Dominican Republic.

== Competitive record ==
=== FIFA U-17 Women's World Cup ===
Year	Result	Pld	W	D	L	GS	GA
(New Zealand) 2008	Did not qualify						
(Trinidad and Tobago) 2010	Did not qualify						
(Azerbaijan) 2012	Did not qualify						
(Costa Rica) 2014	Did not qualify						
(Jordan) 2016	Did not qualify						
(Uruguay) 2018	Did not qualify						
(India) 2022	Did not qualify						
(Dominican Republic) 2024	Quarter-finals	4	2	0	2	6	9
(Morocco) 2025	Group stage	3	1	0	2	2	7
(Morocco) 2026	Did not qualify						
(Morocco) 2027	To be determined						
(Morocco) 2028	To be determined						
(Morocco) 2029	To be determined						
Total	2/13	7	3	0	4	8	16

=== South American Under-17 Women's Championship ===
South American Championship record
Year	Result	Matches	Wins	Draws	Losses	GF	GA
(Chile) 2008	Group stage	4	1	2	1	4	4
(Brazil) 2010	Group stage	4	0	0	4	1	22
(Bolivia) 2012	Group stage	4	1	1	2	7	11
(Paraguay) 2013	Group stage	4	0	1	3	3	10
(Venezuela) 2016	Group stage	4	1	1	2	3	6
(Argentina) 2018	Group stage	4	0	1	3	4	8
(Uruguay) 2022	Group stage	4	2	0	2	5	7
(Paraguay) 2024	Third place	7	3	1	3	17	11
(Colombia) 2025	To be determined						
Total	9/9	35	7	2	17	27	79

== See also ==
- Ecuador women's national football team
- Ecuador women's national under-20 football team

== Head-to-head record ==
The following table shows Ecuador's head-to-head record in the FIFA U-17 Women's World Cup.

Opponent	Pld	W	D	L	GF	GA	GD	Win %
China	1	0	0	1	0	4	−4	0.00
Dominican Republic	1	1	0	0	2	0	+2	100.00
New Zealand	1	1	0	0	4	0	+4	100.00
Nigeria	1	0	0	1	0	4	−4	0.00
Norway	1	1	0	0	2	0	+2	100.00
Spain	1	0	0	1	0	5	−5	0.00
United States	1	0	0	1	0	3	−3	0.00
Total	7	3	0	4	8	16	−8	42.86
