= Brazil women's national under-17 football team =

National youth association football team

Brazil
- Nickname: A Seleção (The Selection)
- Association: Confederação Brasileira de Futebol (CBF)
- Confederation: CONMEBOL (South America)
- Head coach: Simone
- FIFA code: BRA
First colours	Second colours

First international
- Brazil 1–0 Uruguay (Peñalolén, Chile; 13 January 2008)

Biggest win
- Brazil 15–0 Ecuador (São Paulo, Brazil; 2 February 2010)

Biggest defeat
- Brazil 0–6 North Korea (Salé, Morocco; 7 November 2026)

CONMEBOL Sub 17 Femenina
- Appearances: 9 (first in 2008)
- Best result: Champions (2010, 2012, 2018, 2022, 2024)

FIFA U-17 Women's World Cup
- Appearances: 9 (first in 2008)
- Best result: Fourth place (2025, 2026)

The Brazil U-17 women's national football team is an international youth football team. Its primary role is to develop players in preparation for the Brazil women's national football team.

== Fixtures and results ==
Legend

Win Draw Lose Fixture

== Current squad ==
The 22-player squad was announced on 11 November 2020 for two friendlies against Chile.

Head Coach: Simone Jatobá

No.	Pos.	Player	Date of birth (age)	Caps	Goals	Club
	GK	Awanny Míria				(Brazilian Football Confederation) Fortaleza
	GK	Gabriela				(Brazilian Football Confederation) Internacional
	GK	Stephanie				(Brazilian Football Confederation) São Paulo
	DF	Patrícia				(Brazilian Football Confederation) Chapecoense
	DF	Lais				(Brazilian Football Confederation) Chapecoense
	DF	Ravenna				(Brazilian Football Confederation) São Paulo
	DF	Ingrid				(Brazilian Football Confederation) São Paulo
	DF	Ana Beatriz				(Brazilian Football Confederation) Santos
	DF	Ana Clara				(Brazilian Football Confederation) São Paulo
	DF	Isabelle				(Brazilian Football Confederation) Ferroviária
	DF	Tarciane				(Brazilian Football Confederation) Fluminense
	MF	Luany				(Brazilian Football Confederation) Fluminense
	MF	Luiza Travassos				(Brazilian Football Confederation) Fluminense
	MF	Kaylane				(Brazilian Football Confederation) Flamengo
	MF	Gabrielly Louvain				(Brazilian Football Confederation) Botafogo
	MF	Giulia				(Brazilian Football Confederation) Minas Brasilia
	FW	Isabelle				(Brazilian Football Confederation) São Paulo
	FW	Ana Beatriz				(Brazilian Football Confederation) Internacional
	FW	Susan				(Brazilian Football Confederation) Internacional
	FW	Giovanna Lemos				(Brazilian Football Confederation) Sao Paulo
	FW	Raissa				(Brazilian Football Confederation) Ferroviária
	FW	Nycole				(Brazilian Football Confederation) Santos

=== Previous squads ===
- 2008 FIFA U-17 Women's World Cup
- 2010 FIFA U-17 Women's World Cup
- 2012 FIFA U-17 Women's World Cup
- 2016 FIFA U-17 Women's World Cup
- 2018 FIFA U-17 Women's World Cup

== Competitive record ==
=== FIFA U-17 Women's World Cup ===
Year	Result	Pld	W	D*	L	GF	GA
(New Zealand) 2008	Group stage	3	0	1	2	3	7
(Trinidad and Tobago) 2010	Quarter-finals	4	2	0	2	5	4
(Azerbaijan) 2012	Quarter-finals	4	2	0	2	6	10
(Costa Rica) 2014	Did not qualify						
(Jordan) 2016	Group stage	3	1	0	2	2	3
(Uruguay) 2018	Group stage	3	1	1	1	4	2
(India) 2022	Quarter-finals	4	2	1	1	7	3
(Dominican Republic) 2024	Group stage	3	1	1	1	2	2
(Morocco) 2025	Fourth place	7	2	3	2	11	8
(Morocco) 2026	Fourth place	7	3	2	2	18	18
(Morocco) 2027	To be determined						
(Morocco) 2028	To be determined						
(Morocco) 2029	To be determined						
Total:9/13	Fourth place	38	14	9	15	58	57

* Draws include knockout matches decided by penalty shoot-out.

=== CONMEBOL Sub 17 Femenina ===
Year	Result	Pld	W	D	L	GF	GA
(Chile) 2008	Runners-up	7	6	0	1	20	10
(Brazil) 2010	Champions	6	6	0	0	41	3
(Bolivia) 2012	Champions	7	7	0	0	33	3
(Paraguay) 2013	Group stage	4	2	1	1	7	4
(Venezuela) 2016	Runners-up	7	5	1	1	15	5
(Argentina) 2018	Champions	7	5	0	2	11	3
(Uruguay) 2022	Champions	7	7	0	0	33	0
(Paraguay) 2024	Champions	7	5	2	0	20	4
(Colombia) 2025	Runners-up	10	7	3	0	21	4
Total:9/9	5 Titles	62	50	7	5	201	36

== See also ==
- Brazil women's national football team
- Brazil women's national under-20 football team

== Head-to-head record ==
The following table shows Brazil's head-to-head record in the FIFA U-17 Women's World Cup.

Opponent	Pld	W	D	L	GF	GA	GD	Win %
Canada	3	2	1	0	8	2	+6	66.67
China	2	2	0	0	5	1	+4	100.00
Costa Rica	1	0	1	0	1	1	+0	0.00
England	2	0	0	2	1	5	−4	0.00
Germany	2	0	0	2	1	4	−3	0.00
Ghana	2	0	1	1	3	4	−1	0.00
India	1	1	0	0	5	0	+5	100.00
Italy	1	0	0	1	3	4	−1	0.00
Japan	3	0	1	2	1	7	−6	0.00
Mexico	3	1	1	1	2	2	+0	33.33
Morocco	2	2	0	0	4	0	+4	100.00
New Zealand	1	1	0	0	4	3	+1	100.00
Nigeria	3	1	1	1	4	5	−1	33.33
North Korea	3	0	0	3	0	9	−9	0.00
Norway	1	1	0	0	3	0	+3	100.00
Poland	2	0	2	0	3	3	+0	0.00
Republic of Ireland	1	1	0	0	2	1	+1	100.00
South Africa	1	1	0	0	4	1	+3	100.00
South Korea	1	0	0	1	1	2	−1	0.00
Spain	1	0	0	1	1	2	−1	0.00
United States	1	0	1	0	1	1	+0	0.00
Zambia	1	1	0	0	1	0	+1	100.00
Total	38	14	9	15	58	57	+1	36.84
