= 2025 FIFA U-17 Women's World Cup =

Association football tournament

كأس العالم للسيدات تحت 17 سنة المغرب 2025 ⵜⴰⵇⴱⵓⵛⵜ ⵏ ⵓⵎⴰⴹⴰⵍ ⵏ FIFA U17 ⵏ ⵜⵍⴰⵡⵉⵏ ⵏ 2025
- Dreams in the Making

Tournament details
- Host country: Morocco
- Dates: 17 October – 8 November
- Teams: 24 (from 6 confederations)
- Venues: 2 (in 2 host cities)

Final positions
- Champions: North Korea (4th title)
- Runners-up: Netherlands
- Third place: Mexico
- Fourth place: Brazil

Tournament statistics
- Matches played: 52
- Goals scored: 175 (3.37 per match)
- Attendance: 72,762 (1,399 per match)
- Top scorer(s): (North Korea) Yu Jong-hyang (8 goals)
- Best player: (North Korea) Yu Jong-hyang
- Best goalkeeper: (Mexico) Valentina Murrieta
- Fair play award: Spain

The 2025 FIFA U-17 Women's World Cup (Arabic: كأس العالم للسيدات تحت 17 سنة المغرب 2025; Standard Moroccan Tamazight: ⵜⴰⵇⴱⵓⵛⵜ ⵏ ⵓⵎⴰⴹⴰⵍ ⵏ FIFA U17 ⵏ ⵜⵍⴰⵡⵉⵏ ⵏ 2025) was the ninth edition of the FIFA U-17 Women's World Cup, the international women's youth football championship contested by the under-17 national teams of the member associations of FIFA. It was hosted by Morocco from 17 October to 8 November 2025. This was the first FIFA U-17 Women's World Cup to be held in Africa and the second Arab country to host it after Jordan in 2016. It was also the first edition to feature 24 teams. This was the first of five consecutive FIFA U-17 Women's World Cups to be held in Morocco, set to be played annually until 2029.

North Korea were the defending champions, having won a record third title in 2024. They successfully retained the title, beating first-time finalists the Netherlands.

== Host selection ==
Morocco was announced as the 2025–2029 Women's U-17 World Cups host country following the FIFA Council meeting on 14 March 2024 in Zurich, Switzerland.

- Morocco

== Calendar change ==
Talks of a possible change in frequency of the tournament were first unveiled at a FIFA meeting in Doha in December 2022. After the 2023 FIFA Congress in Kigali, FIFA's plans to change the frequency of the U-17 Women's World Cup from biannual to annual was officially confirmed.

== Expansion ==
On 14 March 2024, FIFA decided to expand the tournament to 24 teams. The slot allocation was as follows:

- AFC (Asia): 4 slots
- CAF (Africa): 5 slots (including hosts Morocco)
- CONCACAF (North America, Central America and the Caribbean): 4 slots
- CONMEBOL (South America): 4 slots
- OFC (Oceania): 2 slots
- UEFA (Europe): 5 slots

== Qualified teams ==
Teams qualified Teams failed to qualify Teams withdrew or suspended Did not enter Not a FIFA member

A total of 24 teams qualified for the final tournament. In addition to Morocco, who qualified automatically as the host nation, the other 23 teams qualified from six separate continental competitions. Due to the expansion, the slot allocation was officially confirmed on 15 May 2024.

Ivory Coast, Netherlands, Norway and Samoa made their debut at this tournament, with the Samoans participating in their first ever FIFA competition.

Costa Rica and Italy returned after a 11 year absence, they both came back after last qualified in 2014. Paraguay and Cameroon qualified for the first time since 2016 and 2018 respectively. Canada, China, France and hosts Morocco returned to the World Cup after one tournament drought.

Dominican Republic, England, Kenya and Poland failed to qualify after taking part in 2024.

Qualifying tournament	Team	Qualification date	Appearance(s)				Previous best performance
Qualifying tournament	Team	Qualification date	Total	First	Last	Streak	Previous best performance
Nominated teams by AFC (Note: Teams were nominated by AFC based on results of the last three editions of AFC U-17 Women's Asian Cup; Thailand 2017, Thailand 2019 and Indonesia 2024.)	China	13 September 2024	4th	2012	2022	1	Group stage (2012, 2014, 2022)
Nominated teams by AFC	Japan	13 September 2024	9th	2008	2024	9	Champions (2014)
Nominated teams by AFC	North Korea	13 September 2024	8th	2008	2024	2	Champions (2008, 2016, 2024)
Nominated teams by AFC	South Korea	13 September 2024	5th	2008	2024	2	Champions (2010)
Host nation	Morocco	14 March 2024	2nd	2022		1	Group stage (2022)
2025 African U-17 Women's World Cup qualification	Cameroon	25 April 2025	3rd	2016	2018	1	Group stage (2016, 2018)
2025 African U-17 Women's World Cup qualification	Ivory Coast	25 April 2025	1st	Debut			
2025 African U-17 Women's World Cup qualification	Nigeria	25 April 2025	8th	2008	2024	3	Third place (2022)
2025 African U-17 Women's World Cup qualification	Zambia	26 April 2025	3rd	2014	2024	2	Group stage (2014, 2024)
2025 CONCACAF U-17 Women's World Cup qualification	Mexico	5 April 2025	8th	2010	2024	8	Runners-up (2018)
2025 CONCACAF U-17 Women's World Cup qualification	United States	5 April 2025	7th	2008	2024	5	Runners-up (2008)
2025 CONCACAF U-17 Women's World Cup qualification	Canada	6 April 2025	8th	2008	2022	1	Fourth place (2018)
2025 CONCACAF U-17 Women's World Cup qualification	Costa Rica	6 April 2025	3rd	2008	2014	1	Group stage (2008, 2014)
2025 South American U-17 Women's Championship	Colombia	18 May 2025	7th	2008	2024	4	Runners-up (2022)
2025 South American U-17 Women's Championship	Brazil	21 May 2025	8th	2008	2024	5	Quarter-finals (2010, 2012, 2022)
2025 South American U-17 Women's Championship	Ecuador	21 May 2025	2nd	2024		2	Quarter-finals (2024)
2025 South American U-17 Women's Championship	Paraguay	21 May 2025	4th	2008	2016	1	Group stage (2008, 2014, 2016)
2024 OFC U-16 Women's Championship	New Zealand	18 September 2024	9th	2008	2024	9	Third place (2018)
2024 OFC U-16 Women's Championship	Samoa	18 September 2024	1st	Debut			
2025 UEFA Women's U-17 Championship	Netherlands	7 May 2025	1st	Debut			
2025 UEFA Women's U-17 Championship	Norway	10 May 2025	1st	Debut			
2025 UEFA Women's U-17 Championship	France	11 May 2025	4th	2008	2022	1	Champions (2012)
2025 UEFA Women's U-17 Championship	Italy	11 May 2025	2nd	2014		1	Third place (2014)
2025 UEFA Women's U-17 Championship	Spain	14 May 2025	7th	2010	2024	6	Champions (2018, 2022)

== Venues ==
The match schedule and venues were announced on 1 June 2025. The Rabat metropolitan area hosted all matches.

Originally, the new Prince Héritier Moulay el-Hassan Sports Complex and the Al Barid Stadium had been officially selected to host the tournament, however the tournament was then held in two venues.

The official stadium name listed by FIFA during the tournament is shown below.

Location of the host cities of the 2025 FIFA U-17 Women's World Cup.

- 1 Rabat
- 2 Salé

2025 FIFA U-17 Women's World Cup venues
Rabat	Salé
Rabat Olympic Stadium (Note: Official name used: Prince Moulay Abdellah Olympic Annex Stadium.)	Mohammed VI Football Academy (3 pitches)
Capacity: 21,000	Mohammed VI Football Academy (3 pitches)

== Draw ==
The official draw took place on 4 June 2025 in Rabat. The 24 teams were drawn into six groups of four teams. The teams were allocated based on their performances in the five previous U-17 Women's World Cups (with more recent tournaments weighted more heavily, using a points-based ranking system as outlined by FIFA). The host team, Morocco, was automatically seeded and assigned to position A1. Teams of the same confederation were drawn so as not to meet each other in the group stage.

Pot 1	Pot 2	Pot 3	Pot 4
Morocco ^{H}; Spain; Japan; North Korea; United States; Nigeria	Brazil; Mexico; Colombia; Canada; New Zealand; Ecuador	China; Cameroon; South Korea; Italy; France; Zambia	Paraguay; Costa Rica; Netherlands; Norway; Ivory Coast; Samoa

== Squads ==
Players born between 1 January 2008 and 31 December 2010 were eligible to compete in the tournament.

== Match officials ==
A total of 18 referees and 36 assistant referees were appointed by FIFA for the tournament on 31 July 2025. Originally, Katarzyna Wasiak was selected for the tournament, and latter replaced by her compatriot Meghan Mullen.

Confederation	Referees	Assistant referees
AFC	(Australia) Lara Lee (Kyrgyzstan) Veronika Bernatskaia	(Australia) Emma Kocbek (Kyrgyzstan) Ramina Tsoi (Palestine) Heba Saadieh (Thailand) Suwida Wongkraisorn
CAF	(Kenya) Josephine Wanjiru (Mauritania) Yacine Samassa	(Burundi) Fidès Bangurambona (Egypt) Yara Abdelfattah (Rwanda) Alice Umutesi (Senegal) Tabara Mbodji
CONCACAF	(Dominican Republic) Vimarest Díaz (Mexico) Lizzet García (Puerto Rico) Janeishka Caban (United States) Alyssa Pennington	(Dominican Republic) Santa Medina (Mexico) Mayra Mora (Mexico) Jéssica Morales (Mexico) Aranza Quero (Panama) Katherine Prescod (Trinidad and Tobago) Melissa Nicholas (United States) Meghan Mullen (United States) Kali Smith
CONMEBOL	(Brazil) Charly Straub (Colombia) Paula Fernández (Ecuador) Verónica Guazhambo (Peru) Milagros Arruela	(Brazil) Fernanda Gomes Antunes (Brazil) Anne Gomes de Sá (Colombia) Nataly Arteaga (Colombia) Mayra Sánchez (Ecuador) Joselyn Romero (Ecuador) Viviana Segura (Peru) Mariana Aquino (Peru) Vera Yupanqui
OFC	(Fiji) Torika Delai	(New Zealand) Allys Clipsham (Solomon Islands) Natalia Lumukana
UEFA	(Bulgaria) Hristiyana Guteva (Italy) Silvia Gasperotti (Poland) Ewa Augustyn (Romania) Alina Peșu (Spain) Olatz Rivera	(Croatia) Ivona Pejić (England) Emily Carney (Finland) Heini Hyvönen (France) Camille Soriano (Hungary) Nikolett Bizderi (Italy) Giulia Tempestilli (Lithuania) Irina Pozdejeva (Spain) Eliana Fernández (Switzerland) Linda Schmid (Ukraine) Svitlana Grushko

== Group stage ==
The draw for the group stage took place on 3 June 2025.

All times are local, MST (UTC+1).

Tie-breaking criteria for group play
The ranking of teams in the group stage was determined as follows:
1. Points obtained in all group matches;
2. Points obtained in the matches played between the teams in question;
3. Goal difference in the matches played between the teams in question;
4. Number of goals scored in the matches played between the teams in question;
5. Goal difference in all group matches;
6. Number of goals scored in all group matches;
7. Fair play points in all group matches (only one deduction could be applied to a player in a single match):
  - Yellow card: −1 points;
  - Indirect red card (second yellow card): −3 points;
  - Direct red card: −4 points;
  - Yellow card and direct red card: −5 points;
8. Drawing of lots.

=== Group A ===
Pos	Team	Pld	W	D	L	GF	GA	GD	Pts	Qualification
1	Italy	3	3	0	0	10	4	+6	9	Knockout stage
2	Brazil	3	1	1	1	7	5	+2	4	Knockout stage
3	Morocco (H)	3	1	0	2	4	7	−3	3	Knockout stage
4	Costa Rica	3	0	1	2	2	7	−5	1	

Source: FIFA
Rules for classification: Group stage tiebreakers
(H) Hosts
17 October 2025
20:00

Morocco	0–3	Brazil
	Report	Evelin 12'; Giovanna Waksman 36'; Allyne 75'

Rabat Olympic Stadium, Rabat
Attendance: 11,780
Referee: Lizzet García (Mexico)
18 October 2025
14:00

Italy	3–0	Costa Rica
Galli 42', 72'; Copelli 61'	Report

Mohammed VI Football Academy (pitch 1), Salé
Attendance: 232
Referee: Veronika Bernatskaia (Kyrgyzstan)

21 October 2025
17:00

Costa Rica	1–1	Brazil
Paniagua 32'	Report	Gi Iseppe 83'

Mohammed VI Football Academy (pitch 1), Salé
Attendance: 889
Referee: Alina Peșu (Romania)
21 October 2025
20:00

Morocco	1–3	Italy
El Mesmoudi 82'	Report	Galli 5', 13'; Giudici 23'

Rabat Olympic Stadium, Rabat
Attendance: 9,754
Referee: Janeishka Caban (Puerto Rico)

24 October 2025
20:00

Costa Rica	1–3	Morocco
Moya 90+5'	Report	Baha 4', 39' (pen.); Alfaro 77' (o.g.)

Rabat Olympic Stadium, Rabat
Attendance: 6,037
Referee: Olatz Rivera (Spain)
24 October 2025
20:00

Brazil	3–4	Italy
Giovanna Waksman 45+10', 90+3'; Gi Iseppe 84'	Report	Galli 5'; Venturelli 45+3'; Verrini 49'; Bedini 90'

Mohammed VI Football Academy (pitch 1), Salé
Attendance: 1,289
Referee: Alyssa Pennington (United States)

=== Group B ===
Pos	Team	Pld	W	D	L	GF	GA	GD	Pts	Qualification
1	North Korea	3	3	0	0	9	1	+8	9	Knockout stage
2	Mexico	3	2	0	1	2	2	0	6	Knockout stage
3	Netherlands	3	1	0	2	4	9	−5	3	Knockout stage
4	Cameroon	3	0	0	3	4	7	−3	0	

Source: FIFA
Rules for classification: Group stage tiebreakers
18 October 2025
20:00

North Korea	2–0	Mexico
Yu Jong-hyang 3'; Kim Won-sim 28'	Report

Mohammed VI Football Academy (pitch 1), Salé
Attendance: 555
Referee: Silvia Gasperotti (Italy)
18 October 2025
20:00

Cameroon	3–4	Netherlands
Ntsongo 14'; Tiwa 45'; Zoua 48'	Report	Pennock 2'; Dap 6'; Van der Vliet 43'; Altena 77'

Mohammed VI Football Academy (pitch 2), Salé
Attendance: 555
Referee: Lara Lee (Australia)

21 October 2025
14:00

North Korea	2–1	Cameroon
Kim Won-sim 75', 90+8'	Report	Tiwa 45+2'

Mohammed VI Football Academy (pitch 2), Salé
Attendance: 425
Referee: Vimarest Díaz (Dominican Republic)
21 October 2025
20:00

Netherlands	0–1	Mexico
	Report	Reyes 87'

Mohammed VI Football Academy (pitch 2), Salé
Attendance: 1,641
Referee: Paula Fernández (Colombia)

24 October 2025
20:00

Netherlands	0–5	North Korea
	Report	Ri Kyong-im 18'; Groothoff 35' (o.g.); Yu Jong-hyang 66', 86' (pen.); Ri Hyo-yang 81'

Mohammed VI Football Academy (pitch 3), Salé
Attendance: 1,289
Referee: Charly Straub (Brazil)
24 October 2025
20:00

Mexico	1–0	Cameroon
Reyes 87'	Report

Mohammed VI Football Academy (pitch 2), Salé
Attendance: 1,289
Referee: Alina Peșu (Romania)

=== Group C ===
Pos	Team	Pld	W	D	L	GF	GA	GD	Pts	Qualification
1	United States	3	3	0	0	13	2	+11	9	Knockout stage
2	China	3	2	0	1	11	5	+6	6	Knockout stage
3	Ecuador	3	1	0	2	2	7	−5	3	
4	Norway	3	0	0	3	0	12	−12	0	

Source: FIFA
Rules for classification: Group stage tiebreakers
18 October 2025
14:00

China	5–0	Norway
Chen Ruilin 16'; Zhou Xinyi 45+6' (pen.), 57'; Fang Zhenzhu 82', 89'	Report

Mohammed VI Football Academy (pitch 3), Salé
Attendance: 232
Referee: Vimarest Díaz (Dominican Republic)
18 October 2025
20:00

United States	3–0	Ecuador
Brewer 19'; Touray 41'; Malsom 45'	Report

Mohammed VI Football Academy (pitch 3), Salé
Attendance: 555
Referee: Alina Peșu (Romania)

21 October 2025
17:00

United States	5–2	China
Malsom 27', 68'; DiMaria 44'; Touray 45+3', 62'	Report	Zhou Xinyi 12'; Zeng Yijie 85'

Mohammed VI Football Academy (pitch 3), Salé
Attendance: 889
Referee: Charly Straub (Brazil)
21 October 2025
20:00

Norway	0–2	Ecuador
	Report	Niss 28' (o.g.); Zambrano 74'

Mohammed VI Football Academy (pitch 3), Salé
Attendance: 1,641
Referee: Torika Delai (Fiji)

24 October 2025
14:00

Norway	0–5	United States
	Report	Ream 6'; Kocher 49'; Touray 63'; Whitham 64'; Johnson 80'

Mohammed VI Football Academy (pitch 3), Salé
Attendance: 389
Referee: Milagros Arruela (Peru)
24 October 2025
14:00

Ecuador	0–4	China
	Report	Zhou Xinyi 10'; Zeng Yijie 16'; Zambrano 31' (o.g.); Song Yu 43'

Mohammed VI Football Academy (pitch 2), Salé
Attendance: 389
Referee: Hristiyana Guteva (Bulgaria)

=== Group D ===
Pos	Team	Pld	W	D	L	GF	GA	GD	Pts	Qualification
1	Canada	3	3	0	0	12	2	+10	9	Knockout stage
2	France	3	2	0	1	6	4	+2	6	Knockout stage
3	Nigeria	3	1	0	2	5	5	0	3	Knockout stage
4	Samoa	3	0	0	3	2	14	−12	0	

Source: FIFA
Rules for classification: Group stage tiebreakers
19 October 2025
17:00

France	4–2	Samoa
Marmillot 2'; Gallais 19', 33'; Moreira Da Rocha 90+2'	Report	Eldredge 37'; Makea Leonard 51'

Mohammed VI Football Academy (pitch 1), Salé
Attendance: 365
Referee: Yacine Samassa (Mauritania)
19 October 2025
20:00

Nigeria	1–4	Canada
Joseph 30'	Report	Istocki 2'; Kekić 73'; Amireh 80', 86'

Mohammed VI Football Academy (pitch 2), Salé
Attendance: 637
Referee: Olatz Rivera (Spain)

22 October 2025
17:00

Samoa	0–6	Canada
	Report	Feria-Estrada 14'; Chisholm 36'; Kindel 54'; Martineau 58'; Amireh 67'; Mia Afoa 90+2' (o.g.)

Mohammed VI Football Academy (pitch 1), Salé
Attendance: 876
Referee: Josephine Wanjiru (Kenya)
22 October 2025
20:00

Nigeria	0–1	France
	Report	Fathallah 81'

Mohammed VI Football Academy (pitch 1), Salé
Attendance: 1,345
Referee: Lizzet García (Mexico)

25 October 2025
17:00

Samoa	0–4	Nigeria
	Report	Joseph 13', 34'; Moshood 28' (pen.); Oduntan 67'

Mohammed VI Football Academy (pitch 3), Salé
Attendance: 928
Referee: Torika Delai (Fiji)
25 October 2025
17:00

Canada	2–1	France
Kekić 14'; Moreau-Tranchant 53' (o.g.)	Report	Morissaint 63'

Mohammed VI Football Academy (pitch 1), Salé
Attendance: 928
Referee: Lara Lee (Australia)

=== Group E ===
Pos	Team	Pld	W	D	L	GF	GA	GD	Pts	Qualification
1	Spain	3	3	0	0	12	0	+12	9	Knockout stage
2	Colombia	3	2	0	1	4	4	0	6	Knockout stage
3	South Korea	3	0	1	2	1	7	−6	1 (Note: Fair play points: South Korea –1, Ivory Coast –13.)	
4	Ivory Coast	3	0	1	2	1	7	−6	1	

Source: FIFA
Rules for classification: Group stage tiebreakers
Notes:
19 October 2025
14:00

South Korea	1–1	Ivory Coast
Jang Ye-yun 83' (pen.)	Report	Ouedraogo 2'

Mohammed VI Football Academy (pitch 2), Salé
Attendance: 204
Referee: Milagros Arruela (Peru)
19 October 2025
20:00

Spain	4–0	Colombia
Quer 15'; Chacón 28', 45+1'; Cristóbal 78'	Report

Mohammed VI Football Academy (pitch 1), Salé
Attendance: 637
Referee: Alyssa Pennington (United States)

22 October 2025
14:00

Spain	5–0	South Korea
Chacón 26', 65'; Quer 36'; Torres 62'; Cristóbal 78'	Report

Mohammed VI Football Academy (pitch 2), Salé
Attendance: 266
Referee: Lara Lee (Australia)
22 October 2025
20:00

Ivory Coast	0–3	Colombia
	Report	Clavijo 22'; Crawford 80'; Martínez 90+5'

Mohammed VI Football Academy (pitch 2), Salé
Attendance: 1,345
Referee: Veronika Bernatskaia (Kyrgyzstan)

25 October 2025
14:00

Ivory Coast	0–3	Spain
	Report	Barrios 50', 60'; Fernández 88'

Mohammed VI Football Academy (pitch 1), Salé
Attendance: 374
Referee: Verónica Guazhambo (Ecuador)
25 October 2025
14:00

Colombia	1–0	South Korea
Crawford 73'	Report

Mohammed VI Football Academy (pitch 2), Salé
Attendance: 374
Referee: Silvia Gasperotti (Italy)

=== Group F ===
Pos	Team	Pld	W	D	L	GF	GA	GD	Pts	Qualification
1	Japan	3	2	1	0	6	1	+5	7	Knockout stage
2	Paraguay	3	2	1	0	7	3	+4	7	Knockout stage
3	Zambia	3	1	0	2	5	4	+1	3	Knockout stage
4	New Zealand	3	0	0	3	1	11	−10	0	

Source: FIFA
Rules for classification: Group stage tiebreakers
19 October 2025
14:00

Japan	3–0	New Zealand
Aoki 38' (pen.); Fukushima 75'; Shikida 84'	Report

Mohammed VI Football Academy (pitch 3), Salé
Attendance: 204
Referee: Josephine Wanjiru (Kenya)
19 October 2025
20:00

Zambia	1–2	Paraguay
Mbali 10'	Report	Nyangu 18' (o.g.); Malanda 34' (o.g.)

Mohammed VI Football Academy (pitch 3), Salé
Attendance: 637
Referee: Hristiyana Guteva (Bulgaria)

22 October 2025
17:00

Japan	2–0	Zambia
Sunaga 69'; Fukushima 86' (pen.)	Report

Mohammed VI Football Academy (pitch 3), Salé
Attendance: 876
Referee: Silvia Gasperotti (Italy)
22 October 2025
20:00

Paraguay	4–1	New Zealand
Martínez 49', 54', 65'; Florentín 67'	Report	Pugh 30'

Mohammed VI Football Academy (pitch 3), Salé
Attendance: 1,345
Referee: Yacine Samassa (Mauritania)

25 October 2025
20:00

New Zealand	0–4	Zambia
	Report	Mbali 33'; Chipasula 44'; Sekeseke 69'; Muller 80' (o.g.)

Mohammed VI Football Academy (pitch 2), Salé
Attendance: 1,479
Referee: Paula Fernández (Colombia)
25 October 2025
20:00

Paraguay	1–1	Japan
Bareiro 62'	Report	Fukushima 90+5' (pen.)

Mohammed VI Football Academy (pitch 3), Salé
Attendance: 1,479
Referee: Janeishka Caban (Puerto Rico)

=== Ranking of third-placed teams ===
The four best third-placed teams from the six groups advance to the knockout stage along with the six group winners and six runners-up.

Tie-breaking criteria for third-placed teams
The ranking of third-placed teams was determined as follows:
1. Points obtained in all group matches;
2. Goal difference in all group matches;
3. Number of goals scored in all group matches;
4. Fair play points in all group matches (only one deduction could be applied to a player in a single match):
  - Yellow card: −1 points;
  - Indirect red card (second yellow card): −3 points;
  - Direct red card: −4 points;
  - Yellow card and direct red card: −5 points;
5. Drawing of lots.

Pos	Grp	Team	Pld	W	D	L	GF	GA	GD	Pts	Qualification
1	F	Zambia	3	1	0	2	5	4	+1	3	Knockout stage
2	D	Nigeria	3	1	0	2	5	5	0	3	Knockout stage
3	A	Morocco	3	1	0	2	4	7	−3	3	Knockout stage
4	B	Netherlands	3	1	0	2	4	9	−5	3	Knockout stage
5	C	Ecuador	3	1	0	2	2	7	−5	3	
6	E	South Korea	3	0	1	2	1	7	−6	1	

Source: FIFA
Rules for classification: Third-placed teams tiebreakers

== Knockout stage ==
In the knockout stage, if a match was level at the end of normal playing time, no extra time is played and a penalty shoot-out is held to determine the winners.

Combinations of matches in the Round of 16

The specific match-ups involving the third-placed teams depend on which four third-placed teams qualified for the round of 16:

Third-placed teams qualify from groups						1A vs	1B vs	1C vs	1D vs
A	B	C	D			3C	3D	3A	3B
A	B	C		E		3C	3A	3B	3E
A	B	C			F	3C	3A	3B	3F
A	B		D	E		3D	3A	3B	3E
A	B		D		F	3D	3A	3B	3F
A	B			E	F	3E	3A	3B	3F
A		C	D	E		3C	3D	3A	3E
A		C	D		F	3C	3D	3A	3F
A		C		E	F	3C	3A	3F	3E
A			D	E	F	3D	3A	3F	3E
	B	C	D	E		3C	3D	3B	3E
	B	C	D		F	3C	3D	3B	3F
	B	C		E	F	3E	3C	3B	3F
	B		D	E	F	3E	3D	3B	3F
		C	D	E	F	3C	3D	3F	3E

=== Bracket ===
Round of 16
28 October – Salé
Brazil	3
China	0
29 October – Salé
Canada	6
Zambia	0
28 October – Rabat (Note: The venues between these matches were swapped from the original plan.)
North Korea	6
Morocco	1
29 October – Salé
Japan	4
Colombia	0
29 October – Salé
Spain	0 (4)
France (p)	0 (5)
28 October – Salé
United States	1 (6)
Netherlands (p)	1 (7)
29 October – Salé
Mexico	1
Paraguay	0
28 October – Salé
Italy	4
Nigeria	0

Quarter-finals
1 November – Rabat
Brazil (p)	0 (5)
Canada	0 (4)
1 November – Rabat
North Korea	5
Japan	1
2 November – Rabat
France	2 (6)
Netherlands (p)	2 (7)
2 November – Rabat
Mexico (p)	0 (5)
Italy	0 (4)

Semi-finals
5 November – Rabat
Brazil	0
North Korea	2
5 November – Rabat
Netherlands	1
Mexico	0

Final
8 November – Rabat
North Korea	3
Netherlands	0
Third place match
8 November – Rabat
Brazil	1 (1)
Mexico (p)	1 (3)

=== Round of 16 ===
28 October 2025
16:30

Brazil	3–0	China
Kaylane 3'; Evelin 54'; Gi Iseppe 58'	Report

Mohammed VI Football Academy (pitch 3), Salé
Attendance: 481
Referee: Lizzet García (Mexico)

28 October 2025
16:30

United States	1–1	Netherlands
Johnson 57'	Report	Pennock 3'
Penalties
Schmidt (penalty scored); Malsom (penalty scored); Johnson (penalty scored); Cecil (penalty scored); Ream (penalty scored); Touray (penalty scored); Sadler (penalty missed)	6–7	(penalty scored) Renfurm; (penalty scored) Hubert; (penalty scored) Thomassen; (penalty scored) Vinckers; (penalty scored) Dap; (penalty scored) Pennock; (penalty scored) Van der Vliet

Mohammed VI Football Academy (pitch 1), Salé
Attendance: 481
Referee: Alina Peșu (Romania)

28 October 2025
20:00

North Korea	6–1	Morocco
Yu Jong-hyang 3', 79'; Kim Won-sim 10'; Ri Kyong-im 42'; Diyen 43' (o.g.); Ri Jin-a 71'	Report	Ferkous 89'

Rabat Olympic Stadium, Rabat
Attendance: 5,476
Referee: Hristiyana Guteva (Bulgaria)

28 October 2025
20:00

Italy	4–0	Nigeria
Copelli 45'; Venturelli 58'; Robino 63'; Giudici 89'	Report

Mohammed VI Football Academy (pitch 2), Salé
Attendance: 1,037
Referee: Verónica Guazhambo (Ecuador)

29 October 2025
16:30

Spain	0–0	France
	Report
Penalties
Torres (penalty scored); Carvajal (penalty scored); Cristóbal (penalty missed); Chacón (penalty scored); Domínguez (penalty scored); Gómez (penalty missed)	4–5	(penalty scored) Diakité; (penalty scored) Laboucarié; (penalty missed) Marmillot; (penalty scored) Moreau-Tranchant; (penalty scored) Gallais; (penalty scored) Fathallah

Mohammed VI Football Academy (pitch 1), Salé
Attendance: 461
Referee: Milagros Arruela (Peru)

29 October 2025
16:30

Mexico	1–0	Paraguay
Ibarra 17'	Report

Mohammed VI Football Academy (pitch 3), Salé
Attendance: 461
Referee: Charly Straub (Brazil)

29 October 2025
20:00

Canada	6–0	Zambia
Kekić 13'; Feria-Estrada 30', 90+2'; Angus 39'; Taylor 80'; Medley 85'	Report

Mohammed VI Football Academy (pitch 1), Salé
Attendance: 881
Referee: Torika Delai (Fiji)

29 October 2025
20:00

Japan	4–0	Colombia
Ono 10'; Fukushima 22', 57'; Nakamura 43'	Report

Mohammed VI Football Academy (pitch 2), Salé
Attendance: 881
Referee: Alyssa Pennington (United States)

=== Quarter-finals ===
1 November 2025
16:30

Brazil	0–0	Canada
	Report
Penalties
Gabi Pusch (penalty scored); Gi Iseppe (penalty scored); Kaylane (penalty scored); Pepê (penalty scored); Andreyna (penalty scored)	5–4	(penalty scored) Taylor; (penalty missed) Mutipula; (penalty scored) Medley; (penalty scored) Lofthouse; (penalty scored) Tingley

Rabat Olympic Stadium, Rabat
Attendance: 519
Referee: Olatz Rivera (Spain)

1 November 2025
20:00

North Korea	5–1	Japan
Kim Won-sim 1', 73'; Ri Ui-gyong 6', 90+6'; Yu Jong-hyang 22'	Report	Nakamura 8'

Rabat Olympic Stadium, Rabat
Attendance: 461
Referee: Silvia Gasperotti (Italy)

2 November 2025
16:30

France	2–2	Netherlands
Adedini 34'; Laboucarié 90+2'	Report	Dap 90+3'; Derks 90+8'
Penalties
Kharafi (penalty missed); Laboucarié (penalty missed); Marmillot (penalty scored); Moreau-Tranchant (penalty scored); Gallais (penalty scored); Grondin (penalty scored); Djoubri (penalty scored); Bardet (penalty scored); Fatier (penalty missed)	6–7	(penalty scored) Touzani; (penalty scored) Hubert; (penalty scored) Thomassen; (penalty missed) Weerelts; (penalty missed) Dap; (penalty scored) Vinckers; (penalty scored) Derks; (penalty scored) Van der Vliet; (penalty scored) Van Hunnik

Rabat Olympic Stadium, Rabat
Attendance: 179
Referee: Vimarest Díaz (Dominican Republic)

2 November 2025
20:00

Mexico	0–0	Italy
	Report
Penalties
Reyes (penalty scored); Ibarra (penalty scored); Villalpando (penalty scored); Alvarado (penalty scored); Ávila (penalty scored)	5–4	(penalty scored) Bedini; (penalty scored) Galli; (penalty missed) Giudici; (penalty scored) Robino; (penalty scored) Bressan

Rabat Olympic Stadium, Rabat
Attendance: 203
Referee: Lara Lee (Australia)

=== Semi-finals ===
5 November 2025
16:30

Brazil	0–2	North Korea
	Report	Yu Jong-hyang 44' (pen.), 52'

Rabat Olympic Stadium, Rabat
Attendance: 148
Referee: Alyssa Pennington (United States)

5 November 2025
20:00

Netherlands	1–0	Mexico
Touzani 69'	Report

Rabat Olympic Stadium, Rabat
Attendance: 362
Referee: Milagros Arruela (Peru)

=== Third place match ===
8 November 2025
16:30

Brazil	1–1	Mexico
Kaylane 78'	Report	Evelin 90+6' (o.g.)
Penalties
Gabi Pusch (penalty scored); Dulce Maria (penalty missed); Kaylane (penalty missed); Dany Pereira (penalty missed)	1–3	(penalty missed) Alvarado; (penalty scored) Ibarra; (penalty scored) Villalpando; (penalty scored) Monroy

Rabat Olympic Stadium, Rabat
Attendance: 648
Referee: Vimarest Díaz (Dominican Republic)

=== Final ===
8 November 2025
20:00

North Korea	3–0	Netherlands
Kim Won-sim 14'; Pak Rye-yong 18'; Ri Ui-gyong 42'	Report

Rabat Olympic Stadium, Rabat
Attendance: 5,954
Referee: Olatz Rivera (Spain)

2025 FIFA U-17 Women's World Cup winners

North Korea
Fourth title

== Awards ==
The following awards were given for the tournament:

Golden Ball	Silver Ball	Bronze Ball
(North Korea) Yu Jong-hyang	(North Korea) Kim Won-sim	(Netherlands) Rosalie Renfurm
Golden Boot	Silver Boot	Bronze Boot
(North Korea) Yu Jong-hyang	(North Korea) Kim Won-sim	(Italy) Giulia Galli
8 goals	7 goals	5 goals, 1 assist 445 minutes played
Golden Glove
(Mexico) Valentina Murrieta
FIFA Fair Play Award
Spain

== Goalscorers ==
There were 175 goals scored in 52 matches, for an average of 3.37 goals per match.

8 goals

- (North Korea) Yu Jong-hyang

7 goals

- (North Korea) Kim Won-sim

5 goals

- (Italy) Giulia Galli
- (Japan) Noa Fukushima

4 goals

- (China) Zhou Xinyi
- (Spain) Carlota Chacón
- (United States) Nyanya Touray

3 goals

- (Brazil) Gi Iseppe
- (Brazil) Giovanna Waksman
- (Canada) Julia Amireh
- (Canada) Daniela Feria-Estrada
- (Canada) Melisa Kekić
- (Nigeria) Queen Joseph
- (Paraguay) Claudia Martínez
- (North Korea) Ri Ui-gyong
- (United States) Lauren Malsom

2 goals

- (Brazil) Evelin
- (Brazil) Kaylane
- (Cameroon) Lys Tiwa
- (China) Fang Zhenzhu
- (China) Zeng Yijie
- (Colombia) London Crawford
- (France) Thaïs Gallais
- (Italy) Anna Copelli
- (Italy) Rachele Giudici
- (Italy) Caterina Venturelli
- (Japan) Konoha Nakamura
- (Mexico) Citlalli Reyes
- (Morocco) Mayssa Baha
- (Netherlands) Rochelity Dap
- (Netherlands) Liv Pennock
- (North Korea) Ri Kyong-im
- (Spain) Claudia Barrios
- (Spain) Silvia Cristóbal
- (Spain) Anna Quer
- (United States) Micayla Johnson
- (Zambia) Victoria Mbali

1 goal

- (Brazil) Allyne
- (Cameroon) Divine Ntsongo
- (Cameroon) Yolande Zoua
- (Canada) Mya Angus
- (Canada) Olivia Chisholm
- (Canada) Gabriela Istocki
- (Canada) Lacey Kindel
- (Canada) Marika Martineau
- (Canada) Amy Medley
- (Canada) Chloe Taylor
- (China) Chen Ruilin
- (China) Song Yu
- (Colombia) Ana Sofía Clavijo
- (Colombia) Ella Martínez
- (Costa Rica) Naima Moya
- (Costa Rica) Lucía Paniagua
- (Ecuador) Maite Zambrano
- (France) Rachael Adedini
- (France) Maïssa Fathallah
- (France) Luna Laboucarié
- (France) Camille Marmillot
- (France) Eléna Moreira Da Rocha
- (France) Léa Morissaint
- (Italy) Benedetta Bedini
- (Italy) Giulia Robino
- (Italy) Sofia Verrini
- (Ivory Coast) N'Sira Ouedraogo
- (Japan) Yuna Aoki
- (Japan) Ua Ono
- (Japan) Niko Shikida
- (Japan) Honoka Sunaga
- (Mexico) Berenice Ibarra
- (Morocco) Dounia El Mesmoudi
- (Morocco) Maïssane Ferkous
- (Netherlands) Aymee Altena
- (Netherlands) Ranneke Derks
- (Netherlands) Lina Touzani
- (Netherlands) Tess van der Vliet
- (New Zealand) Katie Pugh
- (Nigeria) Shakirat Moshood
- (Nigeria) Azeezat Oduntan
- (North Korea) Pak Rye-yong
- (North Korea) Ri Hyo-yang
- (North Korea) Ri Jin-a
- (Paraguay) Alison Bareiro
- (Paraguay) Kiara Florentín
- (Samoa) Jayde Eldredge
- (Samoa) Makea Leonard
- (South Korea) Jang Ye-yun
- (Spain) Iraia Fernández
- (Spain) Julia Torres
- (United States) Meila Brewer
- (United States) Maddie DiMaria
- (United States) Ellie Kocher
- (United States) Kherrington Ream
- (United States) Mak Whitham
- (Zambia) Mercy Chipasula
- (Zambia) Masela Sekeseke

1 own goal

- (Brazil) Evelin (against Mexico)
- (Costa Rica) Fabiana Alfaro (against Morocco)
- (Ecuador) Maite Zambrano (against China)
- (France) Océane Moreau-Tranchant (against Canada)
- (Morocco) Imène Diyen (against North Korea)
- (Netherlands) Maren Groothoff (against North Korea)
- (New Zealand) Harriet Muller (against Zambia)
- (Norway) Ebba Niss (against Ecuador)
- (Samoa) Mia Afoa (against Canada)
- (Zambia) Nana Malanda (against Paraguay)
- (Zambia) Mary Nyangu (against Paraguay)

== Marketing ==
=== Emblem ===
The official emblem was revealed on 3 June 2025.

== See also ==
- 2025 FIFA U-17 World Cup
- 2026 FIFA U-20 Women's World Cup

== Notes ==
1. There were three pitches available inside Mohammed VI Football Academy plus another stadium for 4 pitches in total for the tournament.
