= Paraguay women's national under-17 football team =

Paraguay
- Nickname: Las Guaraníes/Las Albirrojitas
- Association: Paraguayan Football Association
- Head coach: (Brazil) Luiz Guimarães
- FIFA code: PAR
First colours	Second colours

CONMEBOL Sub 17 Femenina
- Appearances: 9 (first in 2008)
- Best result: Champions (2025)

FIFA U-17 Women's World Cup
- Appearances: 4 (first in 2008)
- Best result: Round of 16 (2025)

The Paraguayan U-17 women's national football team is the national women's under-17 soccer team of Paraguay. They are controlled by the Paraguayan Football Association. The best performance at the South American level came in 2025 when they won the South American U-17 Women's Championship, and they finished 3rd in the 2008 and 2013 South American U-17 Women's Championship.

== Competitive record ==
=== FIFA U-17 Women's World Cup ===
Year	Round	Pld	W	D	L	GF	GA
(New Zealand) 2008	Group stage	3	0	0	3	5	16
(Trinidad and Tobago) 2010	Did not qualify						
(Azerbaijan) 2012	Did not qualify						
(Costa Rica) 2014	Group stage	3	0	1	2	2	18
(Jordan) 2016	Group stage	3	0	0	3	1	12
(Uruguay) 2018	Did not qualify						
(India) 2022	Did not qualify						
(Dominican Republic) 2024	Did not qualify						
(Morocco) 2025	Round of 16	4	2	1	1	7	4
(Morocco) 2026	Did not qualify						
(Morocco) 2027	To be determined						
(Morocco) 2028	To be determined						
(Morocco) 2029	To be determined						
Total	4/13	13	2	2	9	15	50

=== CONMEBOL Sub 17 Femenina ===
Year	Round	Position	GP	W	D	L	GS	GA
(Chile) 2008	Third Place	3rd	7	4	0	3	22	17
(Brazil) 2010	Fourth Place	4th	6	2	1	3	10	11
(Bolivia) 2012	Group Stage	8th	4	1	0	3	4	14
(Paraguay) 2013	Third Place	3rd	7	5	1	1	17	10
(Venezuela) 2016	Third Place	3rd	7	4	0	3	17	13
(Argentina) 2018	Group Stage	6th	4	1	1	2	7	5
(Uruguay) 2022	Fourth Place	4th	7	2	1	4	9	14
(Paraguay) 2024	Fourth Place	4th	7	3	2	2	13	9
(Colombia) 2025	Champions	1st	9	4	4	1	17	8
Total	9/9	1 Title	58	26	10	22	116	101

== Results and fixtures ==
The following is a list of match results in the last 12 months, as well as any future matches that have been scheduled.

Legend

Win Draw Lose Void or Postponed Fixture

== Players ==
=== Current squad ===
The following 21 players were called up to the squad for the 2025 FIFA U-17 Women's World Cup. The squad was announced on 6 October 2025.

No.	Pos.	Player	Date of birth (age)	Club
1	GK	Estefani Ruiz	16 May 2009 (aged 16)	(Paraguayan Football Association) Club Olimpia
2	DF	Bárbara Olmedo	26 January 2008 (aged 17)	(Paraguayan Football Association) Club Olimpia
3	DF	Luz Benítez	25 July 2009 (aged 16)	(Paraguayan Football Association) Club Olimpia
4	DF	Ximena Moreno	28 April 2008 (aged 17)	(Paraguayan Football Association) Club Olimpia
5	MF	Kiara Florentín	27 November 2008 (aged 16)	(Paraguayan Football Association) Club Nacional
6	DF	Jazmín Pintos	3 April 2008 (aged 17)	(Paraguayan Football Association) Cerro Porteño
7	MF	Fiorella Aquino	31 March 2008 (aged 17)	(Paraguayan Football Association) Club Libertad
8	MF	Maite Mussi	13 July 2008 (aged 17)	(Paraguayan Football Association) Club Olimpia
9	FW	Alison Bareiro	3 January 2008 (aged 17)	(Paraguayan Football Association) Club Olimpia
10	FW	Sofía Cabrera	7 August 2010 (aged 15)	(Paraguayan Football Association) Cerro Porteño
11	FW	Claudia Martínez	15 January 2008 (aged 17)	(Paraguayan Football Association) Club Olimpia
12	GK	Paloma Vergara	10 January 2008 (aged 17)	(Paraguayan Football Association) General Caballero JLM
13	DF	Denisse Leiva	6 July 2009 (aged 16)	(Paraguayan Football Association) Cerro Porteño
14	MF	Jazmín Rolón	4 July 2010 (aged 15)	(Paraguayan Football Association) Deportivo Recoleta
15	DF	Fiorella González	11 August 2009 (aged 16)	(Paraguayan Football Association) Club Olimpia
16	MF	Erika Figueredo	14 May 2008 (aged 17)	(Paraguayan Football Association) Cerro Porteño
17	MF	Florencia Cáceres	30 October 2009 (aged 15)	(United States Soccer Federation) Florida Kraze Krush SC
18	MF	Victoria Ucedo	14 June 2010 (aged 15)	(Paraguayan Football Association) Club Olimpia
19	MF	Yuliza Franco	16 December 2008 (aged 16)	(Paraguayan Football Association) Cerro Porteño
20	FW	Cynthia Casco	22 January 2009 (aged 16)	(Paraguayan Football Association) Club Olimpia
21	GK	Tamara Amarilla	22 January 2009 (aged 16)	(Paraguayan Football Association) Cerro Porteño

=== Previous squads ===
2008 FIFA U-17 Women's World Cup
2014 FIFA U-17 Women's World Cup
2016 FIFA U-17 Women's World Cup

== See also ==
- Paraguay women's national football team (senior)
- Paraguay women's national under-20 football team
- Paraguay men's national under-17 football team
- Football in Paraguay

== Head-to-head record ==
The following table shows Paraguay's head-to-head record in the FIFA U-17 Women's World Cup.

Opponent	Pld	W	D	L	GF	GA	GD	Win %
France	1	0	0	1	2	6	−4	0.00
Ghana	1	0	0	1	0	1	−1	0.00
Japan	4	0	1	3	3	23	−20	0.00
Mexico	1	0	0	1	0	1	−1	0.00
New Zealand	2	1	1	0	5	2	+3	50.00
Spain	1	0	0	1	1	7	−6	0.00
United States	2	0	0	2	2	9	−7	0.00
Zambia	1	1	0	0	2	1	+1	100.00
Total	13	2	2	9	15	50	−35	15.38
