= 2024 FIFA U-17 Women's World Cup squads =

The following is a list of squads for each national team that competed at the 2024 FIFA U-17 Women's World Cup. The tournament took place in Dominican Republic, from 16 October to 3 November 2024. It was the eighth biennial international world youth football championship organised by FIFA for the women's under-17 national teams.

Players born between 1 January 2007 and 31 December 2009 were eligible to compete in the tournament. Each team had to register a squad of 21 players, minimum three of whom had to be goalkeepers (regulation article 27.1). The final squads were confirmed by FIFA on 9 October 2024. The full squad listings are below.

The age listed for each player is their age as of 16 October 2024, the first day of the tournament. The numbers of caps and goals listed for each player do not include any matches played after the start of the tournament. The club listed is the club for which the player last played a competitive match prior to the tournament. The nationality for each club reflects the national association (not the league) to which the club is affiliated. A flag is included for coaches who are of a different nationality to their team.

== Group A ==
=== Dominican Republic ===
Head coach: Betzaida Ubri

No.	Pos.	Player	Date of birth (age)	Club
1	GK	Jaylene Rondón	22 April 2008 (aged 16)	(United States Soccer Federation) World Class
2	DF	Jabes Martínez	24 October 2009 (aged 14)	(Dominican Football Federation) Cibao
3	DF	Livia de León	4 October 2007 (aged 17)	(Canadian Soccer Association) Royal-Sélect de Beauport
4	DF	Paige Martínez	16 April 2008 (aged 16)	(United States Soccer Federation) Orlando City
5	DF	Jeanery Díaz	25 August 2007 (aged 17)	(Dominican Football Federation) Cibao
6	MF	Yuleinis Brito	1 February 2008 (aged 16)	(Dominican Football Federation) 5 de Abril
7	FW	Marcela Zimbrón	10 October 2008 (aged 16)	(Dominican Football Federation) Cibao
8	DF	Renata Mercedes	22 October 2007 (aged 16)	(United States Soccer Federation) Connecticut
9	FW	Julia Jiménez	28 December 2007 (aged 16)	(Royal Spanish Football Federation) Cornellà
10	MF	Alexa Castro	3 January 2007 (aged 17)	(United States Soccer Federation) New York
11	FW	Lila Algarín	28 November 2007 (aged 16)	(United States Soccer Federation) Sunrise Surf
12	GK	Maya Reyes	15 September 2008 (aged 16)	(Dominican Football Federation) Cibao
13	MF	Camila de la Cárcova	30 April 2008 (aged 16)	(Argentine Football Association) Rhino Fútbol
14	MF	Angie Abreu	9 December 2008 (aged 15)	(Dominican Football Federation) Cibao
15	FW	Natalie Bruno	5 August 2007 (aged 17)	(United States Soccer Federation) Prime
16	FW	Ava Barker	26 September 2007 (aged 17)	(United States Soccer Federation) Cedar Stars Academy
17	MF	Emma Torres	12 August 2008 (aged 16)	(United States Soccer Federation) Prime
18	DF	Leoneidy Sanó	10 June 2007 (aged 17)	(Dominican Football Federation) 5 de Abril
19	FW	Jaimaris Díaz	20 August 2007 (aged 17)	(United States Soccer Federation) Predators
20	DF	Sydney Artache	23 June 2007 (aged 17)	(United States Soccer Federation) Real Jersey
21	GK	Yuri Castillo	28 September 2007 (aged 17)	(Dominican Football Federation) Colonial

=== Ecuador ===
Head coach: Eduardo Moscoso

No.	Pos.	Player	Date of birth (age)	Club
1	GK	María Rodríguez	28 October 2008 (aged 15)	(Ecuadorian Football Federation) Quiteños
2	DF	Noemí Camacho	10 April 2007 (aged 17)	(Ecuadorian Football Federation) Universidad Católica
3	DF	Maite Zambrano	13 October 2008 (aged 16)	(Ecuadorian Football Federation) Independiente del Valle
4	DF	Nataly Andrade	6 February 2007 (aged 17)	(Ecuadorian Football Federation) Toreros
5	MF	Fiorella Pico	10 June 2007 (aged 17)	(Ecuadorian Football Federation) Independiente del Valle
6	DF	Scarlet Garaicoa	25 July 2008 (aged 16)	(Ecuadorian Football Federation) Barcelona
7	MF	Evelyn Burgos	19 April 2007 (aged 17)	(Ecuadorian Football Federation) Independiente del Valle
8	FW	Dariana Morán	29 March 2007 (aged 17)	(Ecuadorian Football Federation) Barcelona
9	FW	Jaslym Valverde	10 December 2009 (aged 14)	(Ecuadorian Football Federation) Independiente del Valle
10	FW	Doménica Arboleda	25 May 2007 (aged 17)	(Ecuadorian Football Federation) Independiente del Valle
11	FW	Mary Guerra	7 March 2008 (aged 16)	(Ecuadorian Football Federation) Independiente del Valle
12	GK	Melany Pozo	13 May 2007 (aged 17)	(Ecuadorian Football Federation) Independiente del Valle
13	MF	Caprice Chiuchiolo	17 April 2007 (aged 17)	(Ecuadorian Football Federation) SC del Sol
14	DF	Rosa Estupiñán	2 April 2008 (aged 16)	(Ecuadorian Football Federation) Independiente del Valle
15	MF	Emily Delgado	20 September 2008 (aged 16)	(Ecuadorian Football Federation) Quiteños
16	DF	Esther Carabalí	22 May 2009 (aged 15)	(Ecuadorian Football Federation) Independiente del Valle
17	MF	Valeria Briones	8 November 2009 (aged 14)	(Ecuadorian Football Federation) Barcelona
18	FW	Xiomara Alcívar	14 September 2008 (aged 16)	(Ecuadorian Football Federation) LDU Quito
19	FW	Emily Vargas	7 June 2008 (aged 16)	(Ecuadorian Football Federation) Barcelona
20	FW	Emily Fierro	24 October 2008 (aged 15)	(Ecuadorian Football Federation) Independiente del Valle
21	GK	Doménica Palacios	19 October 2007 (aged 16)	(Ecuadorian Football Federation) Independiente del Valle

=== New Zealand ===
Head coach: Alana Gunn

No.	Pos.	Player	Date of birth (age)	Club
1	GK	Sophie Campbell	23 February 2007 (aged 17)	(New Zealand Football) Hamilton Wanderers
2	DF	Maddison Sawkins	17 August 2007 (aged 17)	(Football Australia) Gungahlin United
3	MF	Alyssha Eglinton	16 January 2007 (aged 17)	(New Zealand Football) Wellington Phoenix
4	DF	Charli Dunn	20 March 2007 (aged 17)	(New Zealand Football) Western Springs
5	MF	Hannah Saxon	3 November 2007 (aged 16)	(New Zealand Football) Eastern Suburbs
6	DF	Mikaela Bangalan	30 March 2008 (aged 16)	(New Zealand Football) Fencibles United
7	FW	Ela Jerez	6 December 2007 (aged 16)	(New Zealand Football) Wellington Phoenix
8	MF	Amber De Wit	20 November 2007 (aged 16)	(New Zealand Football) Nomads United
9	MF	Katie Pugh	18 September 2008 (aged 16)	(New Zealand Football) Wellington Phoenix
10	FW	Pia Vlok	4 September 2008 (aged 16)	(New Zealand Football) Auckland United
11	FW	Laura Bennett	18 November 2008 (aged 15)	(New Zealand Football) Melville United
12	DF	Natalie Young	15 July 2008 (aged 16)	(New Zealand Football) Hamilton Wanderers
13	FW	Katie Chellenbron	8 January 2007 (aged 17)	(The Football Association) Milton Keynes Dons
14	MF	Millee Loxton	28 February 2007 (aged 17)	(New Zealand Football) Fencibles United
15	FW	Mary Brown	5 March 2007 (aged 17)	(Football Australia) Bulleen Lions
16	MF	Grace Bartlett	16 May 2007 (aged 17)	(New Zealand Football) Wellington Phoenix
17	DF	Emily Humphrey	8 March 2007 (aged 17)	(New Zealand Football) Wellington Phoenix
18	GK	Brooke Neary	14 October 2007 (aged 17)	(New Zealand Football) Wellington Phoenix
19	DF	Charley March	11 April 2008 (aged 16)	(New Zealand Football) Hibiscus Coast
20	MF	Kyra Morgan	1 April 2007 (aged 17)	(New Zealand Football) Western Suburbs
21	GK	Harriet Muller	24 February 2008 (aged 16)	(New Zealand Football) Moturoa

=== Nigeria ===
Head coach: Bankole Olowookere

No.	Pos.	Player	Date of birth (age)	Club
1	GK	Christiana Uzoma	20 December 2008 (aged 15)	(Nigeria Football Federation) Edo Queens
2	DF	Rokibat Azeez	12 January 2008 (aged 16)	(Nigeria Football Federation) New Generation Academy
3	DF	Khadijat Adegoke	15 January 2009 (aged 15)	(Nigeria Football Federation) Remo Stars
4	DF	Hannah Ibrahim	7 July 2008 (aged 16)	(Nigeria Football Federation) Remo Stars
5	MF	Faridat Abdulwahab	26 October 2007 (aged 16)	(Nigeria Football Federation) Nasarawa Amazons
6	DF	Jumai Adebayo	1 April 2008 (aged 16)	(Nigeria Football Federation) Naija Ratels
7	FW	Ramotalahi Kareem	12 October 2007 (aged 17)	(Nigeria Football Federation) Honey Badgers
8	MF	Shakirat Moshood	4 January 2008 (aged 16)	(Nigeria Football Federation) Bayelsa Queens
9	FW	Harmony Chidi	21 October 2009 (aged 14)	(Nigeria Football Federation) Imo Strikers Queens
10	MF	Taiwo Afolabi	2 March 2007 (aged 17)	(Nigeria Football Federation) Delta Queens
11	FW	Aishat Animashaun	2 June 2008 (aged 16)	(Nigeria Football Federation) Naija Ratels
12	FW	Ololade Isiaka	3 July 2008 (aged 16)	(Nigeria Football Federation) Abia Angels
13	DF	Vivian Ekezie	3 December 2007 (aged 16)	(Nigeria Football Federation) Heartland Queens
14	FW	Kudirat Arogundade	30 October 2009 (aged 14)	(Nigeria Football Federation) Green Foot
15	FW	Peace Effiong	29 November 2009 (aged 14)	(Nigeria Football Federation) Rivers Angels
16	GK	Sylvia Echefu	24 December 2009 (aged 14)	(Nigeria Football Federation) Confluence Queens
17	DF	Prisca Nwachukwu	8 November 2007 (aged 16)	(Nigeria Football Federation) Imo Strikers Queens
18	FW	Blessing Ifitezue	5 December 2008 (aged 15)	(Nigeria Football Federation) Delta Queens
19	FW	Oghenemairo Obruthe	18 October 2007 (aged 16)	(Nigeria Football Federation) City Sports
20	MF	Muinat Rotimi	25 March 2009 (aged 15)	(Nigeria Football Federation) Nakamura Football Academy
21	GK	Elizabeth Boniface	23 September 2008 (aged 16)	(Nigeria Football Federation) Sunshine Queens

== Group B ==
=== Colombia ===
Head coach: Carlos Paniagua

No.	Pos.	Player	Date of birth (age)	Club
1	GK	Luisa Agudelo	27 March 2007 (aged 17)	(Colombian Football Federation) Deportivo Cali
2	DF	Ana Ruíz	10 August 2008 (aged 16)	(Colombian Football Federation) Cortuluá
3	DF	Sofía Ortíz	10 May 2008 (aged 16)	(Colombian Football Federation) Atlas
4	DF	Zarhay González	7 October 2007 (aged 17)	(Colombian Football Federation) Atlas
5	DF	Sofía Henao	23 May 2007 (aged 17)	(Colombian Football Federation) Atlético Nacional
6	DF	Isabel Weiner	6 February 2007 (aged 17)	(United States Soccer Federation) IMG Academy
7	MF	Isabella Díaz	17 November 2007 (aged 16)	(Colombian Football Federation) Independiente Santa Fe
8	MF	Michel Cuéllar	18 August 2007 (aged 17)	(Colombian Football Federation) Real Santander
9	FW	Maithe López	24 January 2007 (aged 17)	(Colombian Football Federation) Real Santander
10	MF	Mariana Silva	21 August 2007 (aged 17)	(Colombian Football Federation) Independiente Santa Fe
11	MF	Ella Martínez	5 April 2008 (aged 16)	(United States Soccer Federation) Tampa Bay Sun
12	GK	Mariana Tejada	18 July 2008 (aged 16)	(Colombian Football Federation) Atlético Dos Quebradas
13	DF	Nicoll Cárdenas	22 January 2007 (aged 17)	(Colombian Football Federation) Sport Colombia
14	DF	Laura Acevedo	24 April 2008 (aged 16)	(Colombian Football Federation) Atlas
15	MF	Sophia Posada	23 January 2007 (aged 17)	(Colombian Football Federation) Independiente Santa Fe
16	DF	Samantha Rodríguez	8 October 2007 (aged 17)	(Colombian Football Federation) Real Santander
17	FW	Nikol Rojas	21 March 2007 (aged 17)	(Colombian Football Federation) Independiente Santa Fe
18	MF	Lena Tusche	5 September 2007 (aged 17)	(United States Soccer Federation) PDA North New Jersey
19	FW	Eliesther Santos	16 August 2007 (aged 17)	(Colombian Football Federation) Formas Íntimas
20	MF	Reina Torres	11 February 2007 (aged 17)	(Colombian Football Federation) Millonarios
21	GK	Saray Marín	26 January 2007 (aged 17)	(Colombian Football Federation) América de Cali

=== South Korea ===
Head coach: Kim Eun-jung

No.	Pos.	Player	Date of birth (age)	Club
1	GK	Woo Su-min	18 May 2007 (aged 17)	(Korea Football Association) Pohang Girls' Electronic HS
2	DF	Shin Da-in	1 May 2007 (aged 17)	(Korea Football Association) Ulsan Hyundai HS
3	DF	Kim Han-ah	8 July 2008 (aged 16)	(Korea Football Association) Gwangyang Girls' HS
4	DF	Shin Sung-hee	27 June 2007 (aged 17)	(Korea Football Association) Ulsan Hyundai HS
5	DF	Shin Yu-na	23 July 2007 (aged 17)	(Korea Football Association) Gwangyang Girls' HS
6	MF	Lim Ye-ji	29 March 2008 (aged 16)	(Korea Football Association) Pohang Girls' Electronic HS
7	MF	Kim Ye-eun	25 April 2007 (aged 17)	(Korea Football Association) Ulsan Hyundai HS
8	MF	Beom Ye-ju	12 August 2007 (aged 17)	(Korea Football Association) Gwangyang Girls' HS
9	FW	Casey Phair	29 June 2007 (aged 17)	(United States Soccer Federation) Angel City
10	MF	Yang Ji-min	17 August 2008 (aged 16)	(Korea Football Association) Pohang Girls' Electronic HS
11	MF	Seo Min-jeong	31 January 2007 (aged 17)	(Korea Football Association) Gyeongnam Robot HS
12	MF	Baek Ji-eun	16 February 2008 (aged 16)	(Korea Football Association) Ulsan Hyundai HS
13	DF	Ryoo Ji-hae	22 February 2008 (aged 16)	(Korea Football Association) Ulsan Hyundai HS
14	FW	Han Guk-hee	21 August 2009 (aged 15)	(Korea Football Association) Hyundai Chungun MS
15	MF	Kim Min-seo	24 August 2009 (aged 15)	(Korea Football Association) Gajeong Girls' MS
16	MF	Park Ji-yu	6 September 2007 (aged 17)	(Korea Football Association) Chungju Yeseong Girls' MS
17	MF	Nam Sa-rang	30 October 2007 (aged 16)	(Korea Football Association) Ulsan Hyundai HS
18	GK	Jeong Hae-rim	12 October 2008 (aged 16)	(Korea Football Association) Chungju Yeseong Girls' MS
19	DF	Jung Ha-yun	19 June 2008 (aged 16)	(Korea Football Association) Gyeongnam Robot HS
20	DF	Noh Si-eun	24 March 2007 (aged 17)	(Korea Football Association) Ulsan Hyundai HS
21	GK	Jung Yu-jeong	12 July 2008 (aged 16)	(Korea Football Association) Ulsan Hyundai HS

=== Spain ===
Head coach: Kenio Gonzalo

No.	Pos.	Player	Date of birth (age)	Club
1	GK	Laia López	29 January 2007 (aged 17)	(Royal Spanish Football Federation) Real Madrid
2	DF	Martina González	9 December 2007 (aged 16)	(Royal Spanish Football Federation) Barcelona
3	DF	Elena Vázquez	8 October 2007 (aged 17)	(Royal Spanish Football Federation) Deportivo La Coruña
4	DF	Claudia de la Cuerda	5 June 2007 (aged 17)	(Royal Spanish Football Federation) Real Madrid
5	DF	Amaya García	10 June 2007 (aged 17)	(Royal Spanish Football Federation) Real Madrid
6	MF	Lorena Cubo	23 January 2007 (aged 17)	(Royal Spanish Football Federation) Barcelona
7	FW	Noa Ortega	12 February 2007 (aged 17)	(Royal Spanish Football Federation) Barcelona
8	MF	Ainoa Gómez	13 April 2007 (aged 17)	(Royal Spanish Football Federation) Barcelona
9	FW	Celia Segura	10 March 2007 (aged 17)	(Royal Spanish Football Federation) Barcelona
10	FW	Paula Comendador	12 January 2007 (aged 17)	(Royal Spanish Football Federation) Real Madrid
11	MF	Irune Dorado	22 March 2008 (aged 16)	(Royal Spanish Football Federation) Real Madrid
12	DF	Aiara Agirrezabala	2 October 2008 (aged 16)	(Royal Spanish Football Federation) Real Sociedad
13	GK	Ziara Vega	30 August 2007 (aged 17)	(Royal Spanish Football Federation) Athletic Club
14	MF	Celia Gómez	29 September 2008 (aged 16)	(Royal Spanish Football Federation) Atlético Madrid
15	DF	Nerea Carmona	19 January 2007 (aged 17)	(Royal Spanish Football Federation) Levante
16	MF	Clara Serrajordi	7 December 2007 (aged 16)	(Royal Spanish Football Federation) Barcelona
17	MF	Emma Moreno	2 May 2007 (aged 17)	(Royal Spanish Football Federation) Atlético Madrid
18	FW	Iris Santiago	9 November 2007 (aged 16)	(Royal Spanish Football Federation) Real Madrid
19	FW	Alba Cerrato	1 January 2007 (aged 17)	(Royal Spanish Football Federation) Sevilla
20	MF	Natalia Escot	8 February 2007 (aged 17)	(Royal Spanish Football Federation) Barcelona
21	GK	Amor Martín	16 December 2007 (aged 16)	(Royal Spanish Football Federation) Sevilla

=== United States ===
Head coach: Katie Schoepfer

No.	Pos.	Player	Date of birth (age)	Club
1	GK	Molly Vapensky	17 May 2007 (aged 17)	(United States Soccer Federation) Carolina Ascent
2	DF	Jocelyn Travers	10 October 2007 (aged 17)	(United States Soccer Federation) Bay Area Surf
3	DF	Trinity Armstrong	25 July 2007 (aged 17)	(United States Soccer Federation) North Carolina Tar Heels
4	DF	Jordyn Hardeman	5 May 2007 (aged 17)	(United States Soccer Federation) Dallas Trinity
5	DF	Kiara Gilmore	11 February 2007 (aged 17)	(United States Soccer Federation) Dallas Trinity
6	DF	Ainsley McCammon	16 August 2007 (aged 17)	(United States Soccer Federation) Seattle Reign
7	FW	Kimmi Ascanio	21 January 2008 (aged 16)	(United States Soccer Federation) San Diego Wave
8	MF	Y-Lan Nguyen	2 June 2007 (aged 17)	(United States Soccer Federation) San Diego Wave
9	DF	Anna Babcock	6 October 2007 (aged 17)	(United States Soccer Federation) Crossfire Premier
10	MF	Kennedy Fuller	9 March 2007 (aged 17)	(United States Soccer Federation) Angel City
11	FW	Maddie Padelski	29 September 2007 (aged 17)	(United States Soccer Federation) Alabama Crimson Tide
12	GK	Wicki Dunlap	6 November 2007 (aged 16)	(United States Soccer Federation) North Carolina Courage
13	MF	Melanie Barcenas	30 October 2007 (aged 16)	(United States Soccer Federation) San Diego Wave
14	FW	Leena Powell	3 October 2007 (aged 17)	(United States Soccer Federation) Tudela
15	DF	Katie Scott	20 June 2007 (aged 17)	(United States Soccer Federation) Penn State Nittany Lions
16	MF	Scottie Antonucci	4 January 2008 (aged 16)	(United States Soccer Federation) Legends
17	FW	Micayla Johnson	18 January 2008 (aged 16)	(United States Soccer Federation) Michigan Hawks
18	DF	Daya King	1 October 2007 (aged 17)	(United States Soccer Federation) Legends
19	MF	Jaiden Rodriguez	27 May 2008 (aged 16)	(United States Soccer Federation) San Diego Surf
20	FW	Mary Long	24 January 2007 (aged 17)	(United States Soccer Federation) Duke Blue Devils
21	GK	Evan O'Steen	22 March 2008 (aged 16)	(United States Soccer Federation) Dallas Trinity

== Group C ==
=== England ===
Head coach: Natalie Henderson

No.	Pos.	Player	Date of birth (age)	Club
1	GK	Hope McSheffrey	1 April 2008 (aged 16)	(The Football Association) Arsenal
2	DF	Nelly Las	17 December 2007 (aged 16)	(The Football Association) Leicester City
3	DF	Rachel Maltby	25 March 2007 (aged 17)	(The Football Association) Aston Villa
4	MF	Laila Harbert	3 January 2007 (aged 17)	(The Football Association) Arsenal
5	DF	Zara Shaw	6 June 2007 (aged 17)	(The Football Association) Liverpool
6	DF	Cecily Wellesley-Smith	4 January 2007 (aged 17)	(The Football Association) Arsenal
7	MF	Erica Parkinson	18 April 2008 (aged 16)	(Portuguese Football Federation) Valadares Gaia
8	MF	Omotara Junaid	4 October 2007 (aged 17)	(The Football Association) Arsenal
9	FW	Olivia Johnson	4 March 2007 (aged 17)	(The Football Association) Brighton & Hove Albion
10	FW	Vera Jones	18 February 2008 (aged 16)	(The Football Association) Chelsea
11	FW	Lola Brown	31 October 2007 (aged 16)	(The Football Association) Chelsea
12	DF	Sophie Harwood	23 December 2007 (aged 16)	(The Football Association) Arsenal
13	GK	Rebekah Dowsett	31 May 2007 (aged 17)	(The Football Association) Leicester City
14	MF	Emily Cassap	11 May 2007 (aged 17)	(The Football Association) Sunderland
15	DF	Niamh Peacock	22 March 2008 (aged 16)	(The Football Association) Arsenal
16	DF	Simone Sherwood	4 January 2007 (aged 17)	(The Football Association) Leicester City
17	FW	Lauryn Thompson	4 November 2007 (aged 16)	(United States Soccer Federation) Indy Eleven
18	FW	Isabella Fisher	14 May 2007 (aged 17)	(The Football Association) Arsenal
19	DF	Eva Gray	20 November 2007 (aged 16)	(The Football Association) Arsenal
20	FW	Jane Oboavwoduo	29 December 2009 (aged 14)	(The Football Association) Manchester City
21	GK	Eva Spencer	15 August 2007 (aged 17)	(The Football Association) Liverpool

=== Kenya ===
Head coach: Mildred Cheche

No.	Pos.	Player	Date of birth (age)	Club
1	GK	Velma Abwire	15 September 2008 (aged 16)	(Football Kenya Federation) Madira Girls
2	FW	Joan Ogola	29 March 2008 (aged 16)	(Football Kenya Federation) St. Maurice Mwira
3	DF	Kimberly Akinyi	10 June 2007 (aged 17)	(Football Kenya Federation) Madira Girls
4	DF	Jenevieve Mithel	2 January 2008 (aged 16)	(Football Kenya Federation) Nyakach Girls
5	MF	Pearl Olesi	28 December 2007 (aged 16)	(Football Kenya Federation) St. Joseph's Girls
6	MF	Susan Akoth	28 October 2007 (aged 16)	(Football Kenya Federation) Acakoro Football Academy
7	FW	Quinter Adhiambo	4 June 2007 (aged 17)	(Football Kenya Federation) St. Alfred Alara
8	MF	Lindi Atieno	12 April 2009 (aged 15)	(Football Kenya Federation) Sunflower Academy
9	MF	Velma Awuor	28 August 2007 (aged 17)	(Football Kenya Federation) Madira Girls
10	FW	Marion Serenge	3 November 2007 (aged 16)	(Football Kenya Federation) Archbishop Njenga Girls
11	MF	Diana Anyango	7 August 2007 (aged 17)	(Football Kenya Federation) Butere Girls
12	DF	Elizebeth Ochaka	9 June 2009 (aged 15)	(Football Kenya Federation) Kenya Police Bullets
13	FW	Valerie Nekesa	24 July 2007 (aged 17)	(Football Kenya Federation) Madira Girls
14	FW	Lorna Faith	21 November 2007 (aged 16)	(Football Kenya Federation) Butere Girls
15	DF	Christine Adhiambo	27 April 2007 (aged 17)	(Football Kenya Federation) Nyakach Girls
16	GK	Ephy Awuor	13 September 2007 (aged 17)	(Football Kenya Federation) Madira Girls
17	MF	Halima Imbachi	6 November 2008 (aged 15)	(Football Kenya Federation) Butere Girls
18	GK	Scovia Awuor	24 November 2008 (aged 15)	(Football Kenya Federation) Kobala
19	DF	Lorine Ilavonga	17 March 2008 (aged 16)	(Football Kenya Federation) Wiyeta Girls
20	MF	Rebecca Odato	18 December 2007 (aged 16)	(Football Kenya Federation) Dagoretti Mixed
21	FW	Jane Kweyu	10 May 2008 (aged 16)	(Football Kenya Federation) St. Martha's Mwitoti

=== Mexico ===
Head coach: (Costa Rica) Jimena Rojas

No.	Pos.	Player	Date of birth (age)	Club
1	GK	Camila Vázquez	17 July 2007 (aged 17)	(Mexican Football Federation) Atlas
2	DF	Adrianna González	7 January 2008 (aged 16)	(United States Soccer Federation) Team Boca
3	DF	Natalia Muñoz	10 March 2007 (aged 17)	(Mexican Football Federation) Tigres
4	DF	Nicol de León	21 July 2007 (aged 17)	(Mexican Football Federation) Santos Laguna
5	DF	Mia Villalpando	10 May 2008 (aged 16)	(United States Soccer Federation) San Diego Surf
6	MF	Monique Montes	30 August 2007 (aged 17)	(Mexican Football Federation) Monterrey
7	FW	Ana Lorena Torres	9 May 2007 (aged 17)	(Mexican Football Federation) Guadalajara
8	MF	Alexa Soto	20 March 2007 (aged 17)	(Mexican Football Federation) América
9	FW	Evelyn Contreras	18 December 2009 (aged 14)	(United States Soccer Federation) Las Vegas Surf
10	MF	Abril Fragoso	15 May 2007 (aged 17)	(Mexican Football Federation) Pachuca
11	FW	Anaiya Miyazato	3 December 2008 (aged 15)	(United States Soccer Federation) Tucson
12	GK	Bárbara del Real	5 September 2008 (aged 16)	(Mexican Football Federation) América
13	DF	Berenice Ibarra	24 October 2008 (aged 15)	(Mexican Football Federation) Pachuca
14	FW	Celeste Martínez	9 January 2008 (aged 16)	(United States Soccer Federation) Legends
15	DF	Daniela Gallegos	29 May 2007 (aged 17)	(Mexican Football Federation) Toluca
16	MF	Ana Salas	6 September 2007 (aged 17)	(Mexican Football Federation) Tigres
17	FW	Naomy Vázquez	12 August 2007 (aged 17)	(Mexican Football Federation) Guadalajara
18	DF	Alexa Martínez	31 October 2008 (aged 15)	(Mexican Football Federation) Pachuca
19	MF	Sofía Núñez	31 March 2008 (aged 16)	(United States Soccer Federation) Rebels
20	MF	Citlalli Reyes	6 July 2009 (aged 15)	(United States Soccer Federation) Las Vegas Diversity
21	GK	Adriana Meza	11 April 2007 (aged 17)	(Mexican Football Federation) Toluca

=== North Korea ===
Head coach: Song Sung-gwon

No.	Pos.	Player	Date of birth (age)	Club
1	GK	Pak Ju-gyong	7 November 2007 (aged 16)	(DPR Korea Football Association) Naegohyang
2	DF	Choe Chong-gum	15 September 2007 (aged 17)	(DPR Korea Football Association) April 25
3	DF	Jong Pok-yong	20 January 2007 (aged 17)	(DPR Korea Football Association) April 25
4	FW	Son Jo-ye	26 July 2007 (aged 17)	(DPR Korea Football Association) Sobaeksu
5	DF	Ri Ye-gyong	10 November 2007 (aged 16)	(DPR Korea Football Association) April 25
6	FW	Pak Ok-i	12 April 2007 (aged 17)	(DPR Korea Football Association) Sobaeksu
7	MF	Jon Il-chong	12 March 2007 (aged 17)	(DPR Korea Football Association) Amnokgang
8	MF	So Ryu-gyong	10 November 2007 (aged 16)	(DPR Korea Football Association) Amnokgang
9	FW	Ri Su-jong	7 January 2007 (aged 17)	(DPR Korea Football Association) Naegohyang
10	FW	Ho Kyong	28 February 2007 (aged 17)	(DPR Korea Football Association) Sobaeksu
11	MF	Choe Rim-jong	27 January 2007 (aged 17)	(DPR Korea Football Association) Amnokgang
12	FW	Kang Ryu-mi	20 September 2007 (aged 17)	(DPR Korea Football Association) Rimyongsu
13	MF	Choe Yon-a	1 January 2007 (aged 17)	(DPR Korea Football Association) Naegohyang
14	DF	Pak Il-sim	20 May 2007 (aged 17)	(DPR Korea Football Association) Amnokgang
15	FW	Choe Il-son	1 January 2007 (aged 17)	(DPR Korea Football Association) April 25
16	DF	Ri Pom	3 March 2007 (aged 17)	(DPR Korea Football Association) Naegohyang
17	DF	Ri Kuk-hyang	7 October 2007 (aged 17)	(DPR Korea Football Association) Naegohyang
18	GK	Choe Kyong-mi	17 July 2007 (aged 17)	(DPR Korea Football Association) Amnokgang
19	MF	Ro Un-hyang	18 May 2007 (aged 17)	(DPR Korea Football Association) Naegohyang
20	MF	An Kyong-yong	27 August 2007 (aged 17)	(DPR Korea Football Association) April 25
21	GK	Hong Ryu-mi	2 June 2009 (aged 15)	(DPR Korea Football Association) Sobaeksu

== Group D ==
=== Brazil ===
Head coach: Simone

No.	Pos.	Player	Date of birth (age)	Club
1	GK	Ana Morganti	30 November 2008 (aged 15)	(Brazilian Football Confederation) Corinthians
2	DF	Mariane	26 May 2009 (aged 15)	(Brazilian Football Confederation) São Paulo
3	DF	Sofia Couto	2 August 2007 (aged 17)	(Brazilian Football Confederation) Flamengo
4	DF	Gi Mazzotti	3 January 2007 (aged 17)	(Brazilian Football Confederation) São Paulo
5	MF	Helô Camargo	11 December 2007 (aged 16)	(Brazilian Football Confederation) Corinthians
6	DF	Bela	17 February 2008 (aged 16)	(United States Soccer Federation) Beach FC
7	FW	Aninha	26 November 2007 (aged 16)	(Brazilian Football Confederation) Internacional
8	MF	Larissa Forte	26 May 2007 (aged 17)	(Brazilian Football Confederation) Flamengo
9	FW	Juju	18 January 2007 (aged 17)	(United States Soccer Federation) Florida United
10	MF	Kaylane	8 December 2008 (aged 15)	(Brazilian Football Confederation) Flamengo
11	MF	Giovanna Waksman	21 March 2009 (aged 15)	(United States Soccer Federation) FC Florida
12	GK	Isadora Faichel	7 March 2007 (aged 17)	(Brazilian Football Confederation) Ferroviária
13	FW	Maria Santos	28 November 2008 (aged 15)	(Brazilian Football Confederation) Grêmio
14	DF	Larissa Horn	14 March 2009 (aged 15)	(Brazilian Football Confederation) Corinthians
15	MF	Isabela	12 June 2007 (aged 17)	(Brazilian Football Confederation) Flamengo
16	DF	Emilly Lucas	11 February 2007 (aged 17)	(Brazilian Football Confederation) Flamengo
17	FW	Kalena Bellini	25 July 2007 (aged 17)	(United States Soccer Federation) Wasatch SC
18	FW	Yngrid Piauí	22 December 2008 (aged 15)	(Brazilian Football Confederation) Internacional
19	DF	Taiany	20 June 2007 (aged 17)	(Brazilian Football Confederation) São Paulo
20	MF	Martha	12 October 2009 (aged 15)	(Brazilian Football Confederation) Bahia
21	GK	Clara	31 October 2008 (aged 15)	(Brazilian Football Confederation) São Paulo

=== Japan ===
Head coach: Sadayoshi Shirai

No.	Pos.	Player	Date of birth (age)	Club
1	GK	Mao Fukuda	24 June 2007 (aged 17)	(Japan Football Association) JFA Academy Fukushima
2	DF	Yuna Aoki	7 July 2008 (aged 16)	(Japan Football Association) Tokyo Verdy Menina
3	DF	Yuka Makiguchi	16 July 2007 (aged 17)	(Japan Football Association) Cerezo Osaka Yanmar
4	DF	Mitsuki Ota	20 January 2007 (aged 17)	(Japan Football Association) Daisho Gakuen High School
5	MF	Manaka Sakaki	10 October 2007 (aged 17)	(Japan Football Association) JFA Academy Fukushima
6	DF	Haruko Suzuki	11 January 2007 (aged 17)	(Japan Football Association) Tokyo Verdy Menina
7	MF	Hana Kikuchi	6 September 2007 (aged 17)	(Japan Football Association) Mynavi Sendai
8	MF	Hinako Kinoshita	5 January 2007 (aged 17)	(Japan Football Association) Cerezo Osaka Yanmar
9	FW	Momo Saruang Ueki Sato	27 July 2007 (aged 17)	(Japan Football Association) Daisho Gakuen High School
10	FW	Asako Furuta	23 April 2007 (aged 17)	(Japan Football Association) Cerezo Osaka Yanmar
11	FW	Ririka Nezu	10 July 2007 (aged 17)	(Japan Football Association) JEF United Chiba
12	GK	Korin Sakata	19 April 2007 (aged 17)	(Japan Football Association) Japan Soccer College
13	FW	Anon Tsuda	8 November 2007 (aged 16)	(Japan Football Association) Mynavi Sendai
14	MF	Miharu Shinjo	5 February 2007 (aged 17)	(Japan Football Association) Tokyo Verdy Menina
15	DF	Momoka Honda	12 June 2007 (aged 17)	(Japan Football Association) Jumonji High School
16	MF	Noa Fukushima	12 December 2008 (aged 15)	(Japan Football Association) JFA Academy Fukushima
17	DF	Tamami Aso	26 October 2007 (aged 16)	(Japan Football Association) Tokyo Verdy Menina
18	MF	Momoka Sano	17 April 2008 (aged 16)	(Japan Football Association) JFA Academy Fukushima
19	FW	Amiru Tsuji	8 September 2007 (aged 17)	(Japan Football Association) Urawa Reds
20	MF	Hina Hirakawa	6 October 2008 (aged 16)	(Japan Football Association) Urawa Reds
21	GK	Kaho Kumazawa	31 July 2008 (aged 16)	(Japan Football Association) Urawa Reds

=== Poland ===
Head coach: Marcin Kasprowicz

No.	Pos.	Player	Date of birth (age)	Club
1	GK	Julia Woźniak	15 April 2007 (aged 17)	(Polish Football Association) Czarni Sosnowiec
2	DF	Oliwia Łapińska	9 February 2007 (aged 17)	(Polish Football Association) Orlen Gdańsk
3	MF	Julia Przybył	12 July 2007 (aged 17)	(Polish Football Association) Lech Poznań
4	DF	Magda Piekarska	9 September 2007 (aged 17)	(Polish Football Association) Rekord Bielsko-Biała
5	DF	Emilia Sobierajska	22 August 2007 (aged 17)	(Polish Football Association) Pogoń Tczew
6	DF	Iga Witkowska	27 March 2007 (aged 17)	(Polish Football Association) Rekord Bielsko-Biała
7	MF	Krystyna Flis	4 January 2007 (aged 17)	(Polish Football Association) Czarni Sosnowiec
8	MF	Zuzanna Witek	19 September 2007 (aged 17)	(Polish Football Association) Czarni Sosnowiec
9	FW	Aisha Nsangou	2 April 2007 (aged 17)	(The Football Association) Everton
10	MF	Maja Zielińska	22 August 2007 (aged 17)	(German Football Association) Wolfsburg
11	FW	Julia Ostrowska	16 September 2008 (aged 16)	(Polish Football Association) Górnik Łęczna
12	GK	Zuzanna Błaszczyk	17 July 2008 (aged 16)	(Polish Football Association) GKS Katowice
13	MF	Zofia Pągowska	25 April 2007 (aged 17)	(Polish Football Association) SMS Łódź
14	FW	Oliwia Związek	22 June 2007 (aged 17)	(Polish Football Association) Czarni Sosnowiec
15	MF	Weronika Araśniewicz	15 March 2008 (aged 16)	(Royal Spanish Football Federation) Barcelona
16	MF	Małgorzata Rogus	15 April 2008 (aged 16)	(Polish Football Association) Ślęza Wrocław
17	MF	Aleksandra Kuśmierczyk	27 January 2007 (aged 17)	(Polish Football Association) Pogoń Szczecin
18	FW	Emilia Sabuda	22 April 2008 (aged 16)	(Polish Football Association) Resovia
19	FW	Kinga Wyrwas	21 January 2007 (aged 17)	(Polish Football Association) Śląsk Wrocław
20	MF	Lena Marczak	11 March 2007 (aged 17)	(Polish Football Association) Górnik Łęczna
21	GK	Hanna Wieczerzak	29 May 2007 (aged 17)	(Polish Football Association) Śląsk Wrocław

=== Zambia ===
Head coach: Carol Kanyemba

No.	Pos.	Player	Date of birth (age)	Club
1	GK	Loveness Chingwele	18 April 2008 (aged 16)	(Football Association of Zambia) MUZA
2	DF	Eunice Mutonyi	28 December 2007 (aged 16)	(Football Association of Zambia) Police Dove
3	MF	Mary Mukupa	19 September 2007 (aged 17)	(Football Association of Zambia) Red Arrows
4	DF	Nana Mulanda	2 March 2009 (aged 15)	(Football Association of Zambia) Play it Forward
5	DF	Precious Mwape	15 December 2009 (aged 14)	(Football Association of Zambia) Luyando Foundation
6	MF	Blessing Maluba	26 February 2007 (aged 17)	(Football Association of Zambia) Marvelous
7	FW	Gift Chilwizhi	23 January 2007 (aged 17)	(Football Association of Zambia) Kamfinsa Blue Eagles
8	MF	Harriet Matipa	27 November 2007 (aged 16)	(Football Association of Zambia) Yasa Queens
9	FW	Mercy Chipasula	23 March 2008 (aged 16)	(Football Association of Zambia) Kamfinsa Blue Eagles
10	FW	Namute Chileshe	6 June 2007 (aged 17)	(Football Association of Zambia) Green Buffaloes
11	MF	Zangose Zulu	20 February 2007 (aged 17)	(Football Association of Zambia) Pataaki
12	FW	Lillian Mwenda	18 September 2009 (aged 15)	(Football Association of Zambia) Elite
13	DF	Eunice Bwalya	8 November 2007 (aged 16)	(Football Association of Zambia) Yasa Queens
14	DF	Margaret Gondwe	1 December 2007 (aged 16)	(Football Association of Zambia) Luyando Foundation
15	DF	Mwaziona Sakala	4 December 2007 (aged 16)	(Football Association of Zambia) Chipata
16	GK	Mary Nyangu	29 December 2009 (aged 14)	(Football Association of Zambia) Yasa Queens
17	MF	Taonga Mubanga	20 December 2009 (aged 14)	(Football Association of Zambia) Yasa Queens
18	GK	Mwila Mufunte	7 September 2007 (aged 17)	(Football Association of Zambia) Police Dove
19	FW	Lweendo Hanongo	11 May 2008 (aged 16)	(Football Association of Zambia) Driven
20	DF	Saliya Mwanza	16 May 2007 (aged 17)	(Football Association of Zambia) Elite
21	FW	Ruth Muwowo	17 September 2007 (aged 17)	(Football Association of Zambia) Amazing Grace
