= Giovanna Waksman =

Brazilian footballer (born 2009)

Personal information
- Full name: Giovanna Waksman Costa
- Date of birth: 21 March 2009 (age 17)
- Place of birth: Rio de Janeiro, Brazil
- Height: 1.64 m (5 ft 5 in)
- Position: Midfielder

Team information
- Current team: OL Lyonnes
- Number: 30

Youth career
- 2020–2022: Botafogo
- 2022–2025: FC Florida
- 2022–2025: Pine Knights

Senior career*
| Years | Team | Apps | (Gls) |
| 2026– | OL Lyonnes | 0 | (0) |

International career^{‡}
| 2024– | Brazil U-17 | 13 | (10) |
- * Club domestic league appearances and goals ‡ National team caps and goals as of 8 November 2025

Giovanna Waksman Costa (born 21 March 2009) is a Brazilian professional footballer who plays as midfielder for Première Ligue club OL Lyonnes. She is a youth international for Brazil.

== Early life ==
Waksman was born and raised in Rio de Janeiro, the daughter of Renato Costa, a former professional footballer, and Jackeline Waksman. She began playing football at school when she was six before joining local club Sogima FC, in the neighborhood of Jacarepaguá. She had a spell with Fluminense before moving to Botafogo at age 11 in December 2020, where she trained with the women's professional side and played for the boys' academy teams, as Botafogo had no girls' academy at the time. In June 2022, she was Botafogo's leading scorer in their victory at the U-13 Metropolitan Championship – and the only girl in the competition – and was the subject of sexist comments from parents of opposing teams.

Later in 2022, Botafogo owner John Textor arranged for Waksman and her family to move to Jupiter, Florida, so she could train with his FC Florida Prep Academy and attend the Pine School, a private prep school in Hobe Sound, Florida. She played high school soccer from eighth to tenth grade at Pine and was named the TCPalm Player of the Year twice while smashing the school scoring record with 166 career goals in 41 games. She signed an endorsement deal with Adidas in 2024. She was named the Florida Gatorade Player of the Year in 2025 after pacing the nation with 87 goals in 19 games and leading Pine to a 16–2–1 record and their first Class 1A state title game appearance. The same year, she was included in Goal.com's list of the world's "25 best teenage wonderkids". Reports linked her with a move to Première Ligue club OL Lyonnes, which Textor partly owns. She also spent time training with the Washington Spirit of the National Women's Soccer League (NWSL).

== Club career ==
On 9 March 2026, OL Lyonnes announced the signing of Waksman on a contract until the summer of 2028.

== International career ==
Waksman made her international debut for the Brazil under-17 team at the U17 Algarve Tournament in February 2024, scoring two goals against hosts Portugal. She celebrated her 15th birthday during the 2024 South American U-17 Women's Championship in March, where she was the joint leading scorer with JuJu Harris, with five goals, and was named the player of the tournament as Brazil won the competition. She played every minute of Brazil's three games at the 2024 FIFA U-17 Women's World Cup in the Dominican Republic.

Waksman trained with Brazil's senior squad for the first time in July 2025, in preparation for the 2025 Copa América Femenina. She scored three goals at the 2025 FIFA U-17 Women's World Cup in Morocco, including two against Italy in the group stage. After spraining her left knee in the round of sixteen, she missed the rest of the tournament as Brazil placed fourth.

== Honors and awards ==
Brazil U-17

- South American Under-17 Women's Championship: 2024

Individual

- South American Under-17 Women's Championship Golden Boot: 2024
