= Staci Wilson =

American soccer player (born 1976)

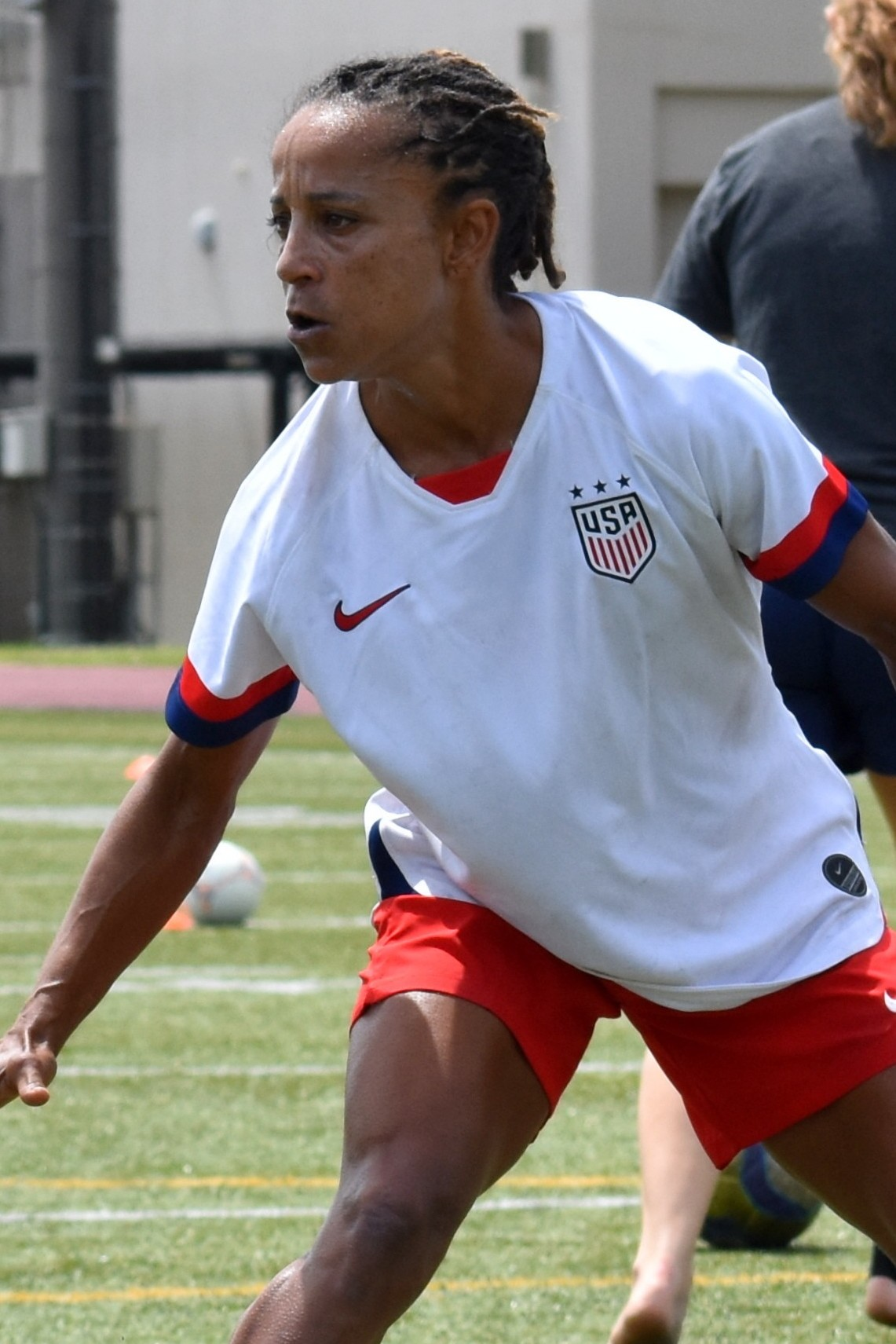
- Wilson in 2019

Personal information
- Full name: Staci Nicole Wilson
- Date of birth: July 8, 1976 (age 50)
- Place of birth: Livingston, New Jersey, U.S.
- Height: 5 ft 1 in (1.55 m)
- Position: Defender

Team information
- Current team: Pine Knights (boys' head coach)

Youth career
- Reston United
- –1994: Jefferson Colonials

College career
Years	Team	Apps	(Gls)
1994–1997	North Carolina Tar Heels	102	(11)

Senior career*
Years	Team	Apps	(Gls)
1998–2000	Raleigh Wings		
2001–2002	Carolina Courage	28	(0)

International career
1995–1996	United States	15	(0)

Managerial career
- 2000–200?: Flint Hill Huskies
- 2004–2006: Loudoun Youth Soccer Association
- 2006–2008: Weston Fury Soccer Club
- 2009–2010: Philadelphia Independence (assistant)
- 2012: Florida Atlantic Owls (assistant)
- 2012–2014: Team Boca Soccer Club
- 2015–2017: Oxbridge ThunderWolves
- 2019–: Pine Knights (boys)
Medal record
Representing United States
Olympic Games
Gold medal – first place	1996 Atlanta
- * Club domestic league appearances and goals

Staci Nicole Wilson (born July 8, 1976) is an American soccer player and Olympic champion. She is an alumna of Thomas Jefferson High School for Science and Technology (Alexandria, Virginia) and the University of North Carolina.

She received a gold medal at the 1996 Summer Olympics in Atlanta.

Wilson was an All-American soccer player during high school in Virginia. She was a dominant defensive player as a member of the North Carolina Tar Heels women's soccer team. There, among other honors, she was the 1994 National Freshman Player of the Year. In March 2001, the team retired Wilson's jersey number 27.

In March 2012 Wilson became an assistant coach for women's soccer at Florida Atlantic University.
