= 2024 South American U-17 Women's Championship =

8th edition of the South American U-17 Women's Championship

CONMEBOL Sub 17 Femenino Paraguay 2024

Tournament details
- Host country: Paraguay
- Dates: 13–31 March
- Teams: 10 (from 1 confederation)
- Venue: 1 (in 1 host city)

Final positions
- Champions: Brazil (5th title)
- Runners-up: Colombia
- Third place: Ecuador
- Fourth place: Paraguay

Tournament statistics
- Matches played: 26
- Goals scored: 83 (3.19 per match)
- Top scorer(s): (Brazil) Juliana Harris (Brazil) Giovanna Waksman (5 goals each)

The 2024 South American U-17 Women's Championship was the 8th edition of the South American U-17 Women's Championship (Spanish: CONMEBOL Sudamericano Femenino Sub-17), the biennial international youth football championship organised by CONMEBOL for the women's under-17 national teams of South America. It was held in Paraguay from 13 to 31 March 2024.

Brazil won the tournament for the third time in a row. Brazil, Colombia and Ecuador qualified for the 2024 FIFA U-17 Women's World Cup in the Dominican Republic as the CONMEBOL representatives.

== Teams ==
All ten CONMEBOL member national teams are eligible to enter the tournament.

Team	Appearance	Previous best top-4 performance
Argentina	8th	Fourth place (2008, 2012)
Bolivia	8th	None
Brazil (holders)	8th	Champions (2010, 2012, 2018, 2022)
Chile	8th	Runners-up (2010)
Colombia	8th	Champions (2008)
Ecuador	8th	None
Paraguay (host)	8th	Third place (2008, 2013, 2016)
Peru	8th	None
Uruguay	8th	Runners-up (2012)
Venezuela	8th	Champions (2013, 2016)

== First stage ==
=== Tiebreakers ===
In the first stage, the teams are ranked according to points earned (3 points for a win, 1 point for a draw, 0 points for a loss). If tied on points, tiebreakers are applied in the following order (Regulations Article 20):

1. Head-to-head result in games between tied teams;
  1. Points in the matches played between the teams in question;
  2. Goal difference in the matches played between the teams in question;
  3. Number of goals scored in the matches played between the teams in question;
2. Goal difference in all group matches;
3. Number of goals scored in all group matches;
4. Fewest red cards received;
5. Fewest yellow cards received
6. Drawing of lots.

The top two teams of each group advance to the final stage.

The draw was held on 12 January 2024.

All match times were in PYST (UTC−3), as listed by CONMEBOL.

=== Group A ===
Pos	Team	Pld	W	D	L	GF	GA	GD	Pts	Qualification
1	Paraguay (H)	4	3	1	0	12	3	+9	10	Final stage
2	Ecuador	4	2	1	1	11	7	+4	7	Final stage
3	Uruguay	4	2	0	2	6	9	−3	6 (Note: Ranked on head-to-head points: Uruguay: 3, Chile: 0)	
4	Chile	4	2	0	2	11	4	+7	6	
5	Bolivia	4	0	0	4	1	18	−17	0	

Source: CONMEBOL
Rules for classification: Tiebreakers
(H) Hosts
Notes:
13 March 2024
18:00

Bolivia	0–4	Ecuador
	Report	Garaicoa 20'; Guerra 25', 46'; Arboleda 57'

CARFEM, Ypané
Referee: María Herrán Sosa (Venezuela)
13 March 2024
20:30

Paraguay	3–1	Uruguay
Martínez 45'; Mussi 64'; Franco 89'	Report	Gómez 75'

CARFEM, Ypané
Referee: Rejane Caetano (Brazil)

15 March 2024
18:00

Uruguay	2–1	Chile
Storace 18'; Guedes 90+7'	Report	Álvarez 2'

CARFEM, Ypané
Referee: Gabriela Coronel (Argentina)
15 March 2024
20:30

Bolivia	0–6	Paraguay
	Report	Bareiro 22'; Martínez 48'; D. Benítez 67'; Franco 77'; Casco 89'; Sánchez 90+6'

CARFEM, Ypané
Referee: Paula Fernández (Colombia)

17 March 2024
18:00

Chile	5–1	Ecuador
Cabezas 35', 44'; Millones 72'; Martinez 76'; Figueroa 82'	Report	Pico 57'

CARFEM, Ypané
Referee: Rejane Caetano (Brazil)
17 March 2024
20:30

Uruguay	3–1	Bolivia
Gómez 36', 72'; Marcora 43'	Report	Ibáñez 17'

CARFEM, Ypané
Referee: Priscila Vázquez (Peru)

19 March 2024
18:00

Chile	5–0	Bolivia
Álvarez 21'; Martinez 37'; Carter 55'; Figueroa 64'; Avello 73'	Report

CARFEM, Ypané
Referee: Silvia Gasperotti (Italy)
19 March 2024
20:30

Ecuador	2–2	Paraguay
Alcívar 82'; Arboleda 88'	Report	D. Benítez 20'; Bareiro 70'

CARFEM, Ypané
Referee: Gabriela Coronel (Argentina)

21 March 2024
20:30

Paraguay	1–0	Chile
Bareiro 67' (pen.)	Report

CARFEM, Ypané
Referee: Paula Fernández (Colombia)
21 March 2024
20:30

Ecuador	4–0	Uruguay
Chiuchiolo 37', 42'; Arboleda 54'; Guerra 90+3'	Report

Estadio Arsenio Erico, Asunción
Referee: Priscila Vázquez (Peru)

=== Group B ===
Pos	Team	Pld	W	D	L	GF	GA	GD	Pts	Qualification
1	Brazil	4	3	1	0	9	1	+8	10	Final stage
2	Colombia	4	3	0	1	7	4	+3	9	Final stage
3	Argentina	4	1	2	1	4	3	+1	5	
4	Peru	4	1	0	3	1	9	−8	3	
5	Venezuela	4	0	1	3	0	4	−4	1	

Source: CONMEBOL
Rules for classification: Tiebreakers
14 March 2024
18:00

Brazil	2–0	Venezuela
Stephanie 70'; Kaylane 90+5'	Report

Estadio Arsenio Erico, Asunción
Referee: Angelina Rodas Almirón (Paraguay)
14 March 2024
20:30

Peru	0–4	Argentina
	Report	Lomba 5', 41'; Moyano 18'; Martínez 45+5'

Estadio Arsenio Erico, Asunción
Referee: Silvia Ríos (Uruguay)

16 March 2024
18:00

Peru	0–3	Brazil
	Report	Juju Harris 17'; Kaylane 21'; Larissa 31'

Estadio Arsenio Erico, Asunción
Referee: Silvia Gasperotti (Italy)
16 March 2024
20:30

Venezuela	0–1	Colombia
	Report	Díaz 85'

Estadio Arsenio Erico, Asunción
Referee: Dayared Ramírez (Chile)

18 March 2024
18:00

Colombia	3–0	Argentina
Silva 17', 64'; Cuéllar 24'	Report

Estadio Arsenio Erico, Asunción
Referee: Angelina Rodas Almirón (Paraguay)
18 March 2024
20:30

Venezuela	0–1	Peru
	Report	Kaemmerer 65'

Estadio Arsenio Erico, Asunción
Referee: Alejandra Quisbert (Bolivia)

20 March 2024
18:00

Argentina	0–0	Brazil
	Report

Estadio Arsenio Erico, Asunción
Referee: Silvia Ríos (Uruguay)
20 March 2024
20:30

Colombia	2–0	Peru
Díaz 71' (pen.); Torres 89'	Report

Estadio Arsenio Erico, Asunción
Referee: María Lupera Reto (Ecuador)

22 March 2024
20:30

Brazil	4–1	Colombia
Juju Harris 16', 32'; Ana Elisa 43'; Waksman 54'	Report	Rojas 68'

CARFEM, Ypané
Referee: Silvia Gasperotti (Italy)
22 March 2024
20:30

Argentina	0–0	Venezuela
	Report

Estadio Arsenio Erico, Asunción
Referee: Dayared Ramírez (Chile)

== Final stage ==
In the final stage, the teams are ranked according to points earned (3 points for a win, 1 point for a draw, 0 points for a loss). If tied on points, tiebreakers are applied in the following order, taking into account only matches in the final stage (Regulations Article 21):

1. Head-to-head result in games between tied teams;
  1. Points in the matches played between the teams in question;
  2. Goal difference in the matches played between the teams in question;
  3. Number of goals scored in the matches played between the teams in question;
2. Goal difference in all group matches;
3. Number of goals scored in all group matches;
4. Fewest red cards received;
5. Fewest yellow cards received
6. Drawing of lots.

All match times are in PYST (UTC−3), as listed by CONMEBOL.

Pos	Team	Pld	W	D	L	GF	GA	GD	Pts	Qualification
1	Brazil (C)	3	2	1	0	11	3	+8	7	2024 FIFA U-17 Women's World Cup
2	Colombia	3	1	2	0	6	4	+2	5	2024 FIFA U-17 Women's World Cup
3	Ecuador	3	1	0	2	3	8	−5	3	2024 FIFA U-17 Women's World Cup
4	Paraguay (H)	3	0	1	2	1	6	−5	1	

Source: CONMEBOL
(C) Champions; (H) Hosts
25 March 2024
17:00

Brazil	4–0	Ecuador
Waksman 19', 72', 90+3'; Francine 90+4'	Report

CARFEM, Ypané
Referee: Milagros Arruela (Peru)
25 March 2024
19:30

Paraguay	0–0	Colombia
	Report

CARFEM, Ypané
Referee: Anahí Fernández (Uruguay)

28 March 2024
17:00

Brazil	2–2	Colombia
Juju Harris 61'; Myka 62'	Report	Rojas 45+3' (pen.); López 51'

CARFEM, Ypané
Referee: Dione Rissios (Chile)
28 March 2024
19:30

Ecuador	1–0	Paraguay
Arboleda 7'	Report

CARFEM, Ypané
Referee: Silvia Gasperotti (Italy)

31 March 2024
17:00

Colombia	4–2	Ecuador
Martínez 1'; Rodríguez 71'; López 73'; Rojas 76'	Report	Delgado 3', 59'

CARFEM, Ypané
Referee: Anahí Fernández (Uruguay)
31 March 2024
19:30

Paraguay	1–5	Brazil
C. Martínez 47'	Report	Juju Harris 12'; Waksman 13'; Aninha 21'; Bellini 57'; Couto 77'

CARFEM, Ypané
Referee: Milagros Arruela (Peru)

== Goalscorers ==
There were 83 goals scored in 26 matches, for an average of 3.19 goals per match.

5 goals

- (Brazil) Juju Harris
- (Brazil) Giovanna Waksman

4 goals

- (Ecuador) Doménica Arboleda

3 goals

- (Colombia) Nikol Rojas
- (Ecuador) Mary Guerra
- (Paraguay) Alison Bareiro
- (Paraguay) Claudia Martínez
- (Uruguay) Agustina Gómez

2 goals

- (Argentina) Morena Lomba
- (Brazil) Kaylane
- (Chile) Anaís Álvarez
- (Chile) Pamela Cabezas
- (Chile) Ámbar Figueroa
- (Chile) Antonella Martinez
- (Colombia) Isabella Díaz
- (Colombia) Maithé López
- (Colombia) Mariana Silva
- (Ecuador) Caprice Chiuchiolo
- (Ecuador) Emily Delgado
- (Paraguay) Diana Benítez
- (Paraguay) Sofía Franco

1 goal

- (Argentina) Julieta Martínez
- (Argentina) Juana Moyano
- (Bolivia) María Ibáñez
- (Brazil) Ana Elisa
- (Brazil) Aninha
- (Brazil) Kalena Bellini
- (Brazil) Sofia Couto
- (Brazil) Francine
- (Brazil) Larissa
- (Brazil) Myka
- (Brazil) Stephanie
- (Chile) Maite Avello
- (Chile) Nicole Carter
- (Chile) Natsumy Millones
- (Colombia) Michel Cuéllar
- (Colombia) Ella Martínez
- (Colombia) Samantha Rodríguez
- (Colombia) Reina Torres
- (Ecuador) Xiomara Alcívar
- (Ecuador) Scarlet Garaicoa
- (Ecuador) Fiorella Pico
- (Paraguay) Cynthia Casco
- (Paraguay) Maité Mussi
- (Paraguay) Maira Sánchez
- (Peru) Isabella Kaemmerer
- (Uruguay) Ilana Guedes
- (Uruguay) Agostina Marcora
- (Uruguay) Julieta Storace

== Qualified teams for FIFA U-17 Women's World Cup ==
The following three teams from CONMEBOL qualified for the 2024 FIFA U-17 Women's World Cup in the Dominican Republic.

Team	Qualified on	Previous appearances in tournament^{1}
Brazil	28 March 2024	6 (2008, 2010, 2012, 2016, 2018, 2022)
Colombia	31 March 2024	5 (2008, 2012, 2014, 2018, 2022)
Ecuador	31 March 2024	0 (debut)

^{1} Bold indicates champions for that year. Italic indicates hosts for that year.
