= Ámbar Figueroa =

Chilean footballer (born 2007)

Personal information
- Full name: Ámbar Carolay Figueroa Rollino
- Date of birth: 24 October 2007 (age 19)
- Place of birth: Valparaíso, Chile
- Position: Attacking midfielder

Team information
- Current team: Universidad Católica

Youth career
- Santiago Wanderers
- 2021–2022: Santiago Morning

Senior career*
Years	Team	Apps	(Gls)
2022–2024	Santiago Morning		
2025–	Universidad Católica		

International career^{‡}
2022–	Chile U17	10	(1)
2023–	Chile	2	(0)
- * Club domestic league appearances and goals ‡ National team caps and goals as of 1 February 2024

Ámbar Carolay Figueroa Rollino (born 24 October 2007) is a Chilean footballer who plays as an attacking midfielder for Universidad Católica and the Chile women's national team.

== Club career ==
Born in Valparaíso, Chile, Figueroa is a product of the women's team of Santiago Wanderers. She was promoted to the under-17 team at the age of ten.

In 2021, Figueroa moved to Santiago and signed with Santiago Morning, then the Chilean champions. In the 2023 season, she was promoted to the first team.

Figueroa signed with Universidad Católica for the 2025 season.

== International career ==
At under-17 level, Figueroa represented Chile in both the 2022 South American Championship and the 2022 FIFA World Cup.

In 2024, she was included in the Chile squad for the South American U-17 Championship.

At senior level, she received her first call-up to the Chile national team and made appearances in two unofficial matches against Panama in February 2023. She scored a goal in both matches, a 1–3 loss and a 4–0 win. Subsequently, she was called up to the inter-confederation play-off match for the FIFA World Cup against Haiti, making her official debut in the preparation match against Argentina on 17 February, a 4–0 loss.
