= Kaylane Vieira =

Brazilian footballer (born 2008)

Personal information
- Full name: Kaylane Cristina Vieira
- Date of birth: 8 December 2008 (age 17)
- Place of birth: Duque de Caxias, Brazil
- Position: Attacking midfielder

Team information
- Current team: Flamengo
- Number: 20

Youth career
- 2022–: Flamengo

Senior career*
Years	Team	Apps	(Gls)
2023–	Flamengo	4	(0)

International career^{‡}
2024–2025	Brazil U17	17	(5)
2026–	Brazil U20	7	(0)
2026–	Brazil	2	(0)
- * Club domestic league appearances and goals as of 20:13, 13 April 2026 (UTC) ‡ National team caps and goals as of 10 October 2026

Kaylane Cristina Vieira (born 8 December 2008) is a Brazilian professional footballer who plays as an attacking midfielder for Brasileirão Feminino club Flamengo and the Brazil national team.

== Club career ==
Born and raised in Duque de Caxias, Rio de Janeiro, Kaylane Vieira joined Flamengo's youth sides in 2022. She made her first team debut at the age of just 14 on 3 November 2023, in a 11–0 Campeonato Carioca de Futebol Feminino home routing of Duque de Caxias.

Kaylane Vieira subsequently returned to the youth categories, and was only included back in the first team during the 2026 season. On 13 August 2026, she signed an extension with Flamengo through 2028.

== International career ==
Kaylane Vieira represented Brazil at under-17 and under-20 levels, winning the 2024 South American U-17 Championship with the former side and the 2026 South American Under-20 Championship with the latter. On 29 June 2025, she was called up to the full side for a period of trainings prior to the 2025 Copa América Femenina. On 10 June 2026, she made her senior international debut in a 1–0 friendly loss to the United States.

== Honours ==
Flamengo

- Campeonato Carioca de Futebol Feminino: 2023

Brazil U17

- South American Under-17 Women's Football Championship: 2024

Brazil U20

- South American Under-20 Women's Football Championship: 2026
