= Evan O'Steen =

American soccer player (born 2008)

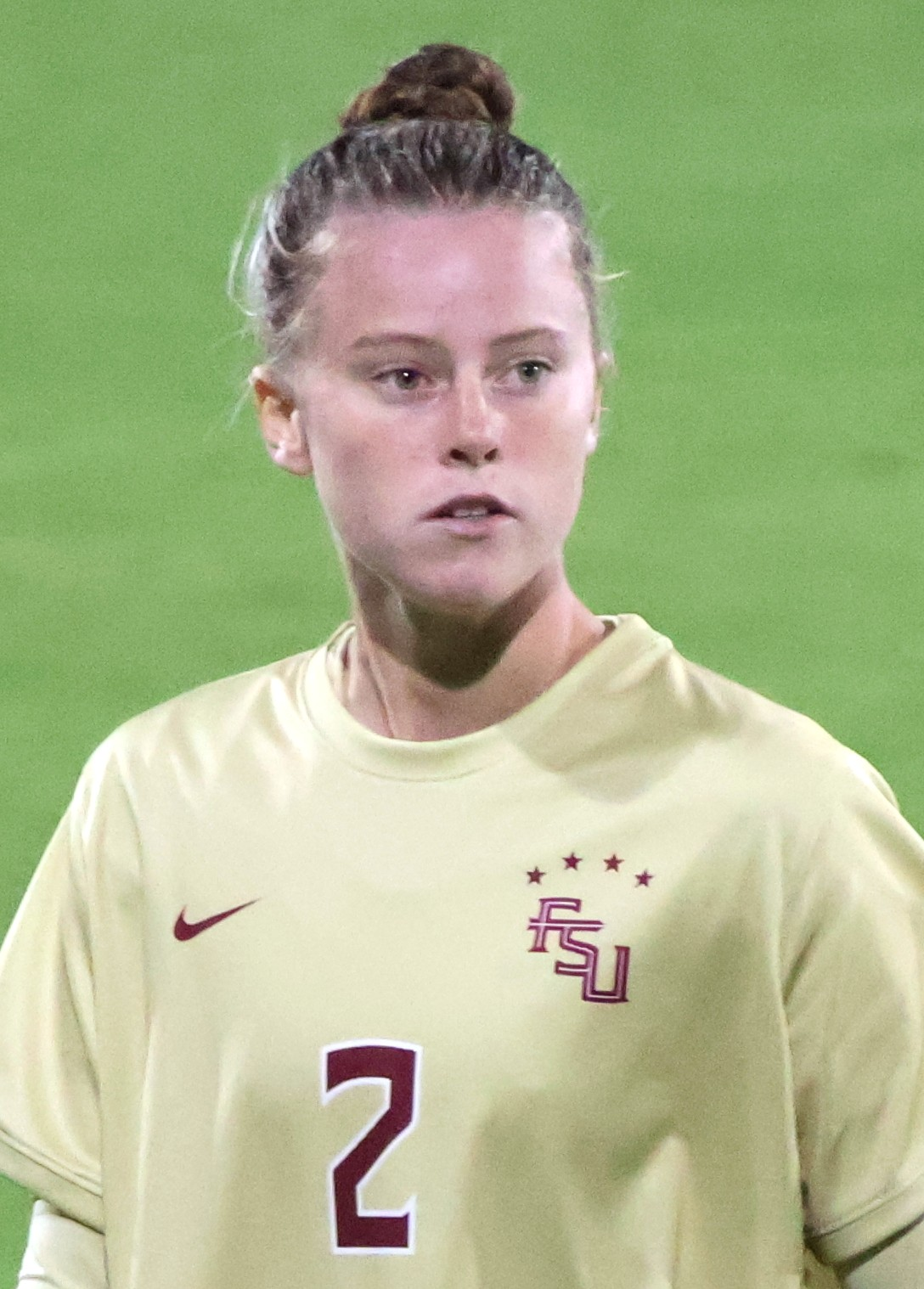
- O'Steen with Florida State in 2025

Personal information
- Full name: Evan Kayleigh O'Steen
- Date of birth: March 22, 2008 (age 18)
- Height: 5 ft 10 in (1.78 m)
- Position: Goalkeeper

Team information
- Current team: Seattle Reign
- Number: 18

Youth career
- Solar SC

College career
Years	Team	Apps	(Gls)
2025	Florida State Seminoles	4	(0)

Senior career*
Years	Team	Apps	(Gls)
2024–2025	Dallas Trinity	0	(0)
2026–	Seattle Reign	0	(0)

International career^{‡}
2023	United States U-15		
2024	United States U-16		
2024–2025	United States U-17	13	(0)
2026–	United States U-19	1	(0)
2026–	United States U-20	2	(0)
Medal record
Women's soccer
FIFA U-17 Women's World Cup
Bronze medal – third place	Dominican Republic 2024
- * Club domestic league appearances and goals ‡ National team caps and goals as of 00:06, September 12, 2026 (UTC)

Evan Kayleigh O'Steen (born March 22, 2008) is an American professional soccer player who plays as a goalkeeper for Seattle Reign FC of the National Women's Soccer League (NWSL). She was a member of USL Super League club Dallas Trinity and the national champion Florida State Seminoles before signing with the Reign at age 17 in 2026. She helped lead the United States to bronze and won the Golden Glove at the 2024 FIFA U-17 Women's World Cup.

== Early life ==
O'Steen grew up in the Dallas–Fort Worth suburb of Grapevine, Texas. She played ECNL club soccer for Solar SC, winning two ECNL national championships and being named ECNL All-American and the Conference U15 Player of the Year in 2023. She also played basketball at Grapevine Faith Christian School and was named the Fort Worth Star-Telegram Newcomer of the Year after her freshman basketball season in 2023. She committed to play college soccer for the Florida State Seminoles in her junior year, before choosing to reclassify and graduate one year early from the TTU K–12 online school in the class of 2025.

O'Steen signed with USL Super League club Dallas Trinity as an academy player (allowing her to retain college eligibility) before the league's inaugural 2024–25 season. She made her only appearance for the Trinity in their friendly against European champions Barcelona, playing the middle third of their debut at the Cotton Bowl on August 30, 2024. She joined the NWSL's Kansas City Current as a non-roster invitee in the 2025 preseason. She also trained with the NWSL's Seattle Reign early the same season.

== College career ==
O'Steen joined the Florida State Seminoles as a reclassified freshman in 2025, competing for the starting job with returning starter Addie Todd and fellow freshman Kate Ockene. Todd began the season as the starter, and O'Steen earned minutes in four games before leaving for the 2025 FIFA U-17 Women's World Cup. After O'Steen returned from Morocco, Ockene had won the job and started every game in the NCAA tournament as the Seminoles won their fifth national title. O'Steen made only four appearances with two starts and allowed no goals. After the season, she decided to go pro and give up her remaining college eligibility.

== Club career ==
Seattle Reign FC announced on January 16, 2026, that they had signed O'Steen to her first professional contract on a one-year deal. The 17-year-old was the youngest goalkeeper ever to sign in the NWSL.

== International career ==
O'Steen was called up to the United States under-15 team in 2022, playing in friendlies for the under-15s and under-16s the following years. At age 16, she joined the under-17 team and became their starter at the 2024 FIFA U-17 Women's World Cup in the Dominican Republic, helping the United States achieve their best result since 2008. She allowed just one goal in five starts, losing 1–0 to North Korea in the semifinals, and recorded an assist to Maddie Padelski in a 3–0 victory over England in the third place match. She was awarded the Golden Glove as the best goalkeeper in the tournament. She again played for the under-17 team at the 2025 FIFA U-17 Women's World Cup in Morocco, starting three games and earning one shutout as the United States lost on penalties to the Netherlands in the round of 16. At age 18, she was an unused part of the under-20 roster at the 2026 FIFA U-20 Women's World Cup in Poland.

== Honors and awards ==
Florida State Seminoles

- NCAA Division I women's soccer tournament: 2025

United States U-17

- FIFA U-17 Women's World Cup bronze medal: 2024

Individual

- FIFA U-17 Women's World Cup Golden Glove: 2024
