= Ghada Mehat =

Algerian football referee (born 1995)

- Born: Ghada Mehat; 1 May 1995 (age 31); Sétif, Algeria

Domestic
Years	League	Role
2023	2023 CAF Women's Champions League	Referee
2024–	Algerian Cup	Referee

International
Years	League	Role
2022–	FIFA listed	Referee
2024	2024 FIFA U-17 Women's World Cup	Referee
2025	2024 Women's Africa Cup of Nations	Referee

Ghada Mehat (Arabic: غادة محاط; born 1 May 1995) is an Algerian football referee. She has been on the FIFA International Referees List since 2022.

== Career ==
Born in Sétif, Mehat developed a passion for football from an early age, often playing in the streets of her hometown. She spent a brief period as a player with JF Khroub before becoming interested in the role of a referee. In 2015, at the age of 20, she decided to pursue refereeing and enrolled in a two-month training course organized by the Constantine Regional Football League. She was the only female participant to complete the course and was subsequently certified as a referee. Her officiating career began with youth tournaments and gradually advanced to the national level, eventually leading to her recognition as an international referee in 2022. On 22 September 2023, she officiated her first international match in the 2024 Women's Africa Cup of Nations qualification, overseeing the fixture between Ivory Coast and Tanzania.

On 14 April 2024, She became the first woman to referee a men's professional match in the Algerian Cup, officiating a quarter-final match during the 2023–24 Algerian Cup. The match was marked by a heated altercation between then-MC Alger playmaker Youcef Belaïli and Mehat, which drew widespread attention and fueled debate over the presence of female referees in men's football.

In August 2024, Mehat was appointed to officiate in the 2024 FIFA U-17 Women's World Cup in the Dominican Republic.

== Personal life ==
Mehat holds a master's degree (Master 2) in Sciences and Techniques of Physical and Sports Activities from Abdelhamid Mehri University in Constantine. In addition, she speaks four languages: Arabic, French, English, and German.
