= United States women's national under-19 soccer team =

United States under-19
- Nickname(s): Team USA; The Stars and Stripes; The Yanks
- Association: United States Soccer Federation
- Confederation: CONCACAF (North America)
- Head coach: Carrie Kveton
- FIFA code: USA
| First colors | Second colors |

Pan American Games
- Appearances: 1 (first in 2023)
- Best result: Bronze (2023)
Medal record
Pan American Games
| Bronze medal – third place | 2023 Santiago | Team |

The United States U-19 women's national soccer team is a youth soccer team operated under the auspices of U.S. Soccer. Its primary role is the development of players in preparation for the senior women's national team, as well as bridging the development between the two major youth competition levels of the U-17 and the U-20.

== History ==
The United States U-19 became active as the primary youth-level national team in 2001 when the United States Soccer Federation decided to change the age limit from the U-18 to U-19. The move was in preparation for FIFA's introduction of the first ever FIFA U-19 Women's World Championship (which has since changed to U-20). The new U-19 squad won the inaugural 2002 FIFA U-19 Women's World Championship in Canada, where they beat the hosts on a golden goal by captain and future United States women's national team mainstay Lindsay Tarpley. Five other members of that same team would join Tarpley as teammates on the senior international team: Rachel Buehler, Lori Chalupny, Heather O'Reilly, Leslie Osborne and Angie Woznuk. Other notable 2002 team members were Kelly Wilson, the all-time leading goal scorer in the history of the U-20 team, as well as two-time Hermann Trophy winner Kerri Hanks, who would go on to become one of the most decorated players in women's collegiate soccer.

In 2004, the U-19 team placed third at the 2004 FIFA U-19 Women's World Championship in Thailand, after having been defeated by Germany in the semifinals. The tournament marked the world championship debut of future senior national team members Yael Averbuch, Stephanie Lopez, Amy Rodriguez and Megan Rapinoe. 2004 also saw the first loss to a similar-aged team in the history of the program when the squad lost to Japan.

The U-19 team became dormant in 2005 when U.S. Soccer raised the age of the squad from U-19 to U-20. The move was, again, in response to FIFA's altering of the competition age from U-19 to U-20. The team subsequently had only periodic competitions until 2019, when the Federation (under general manager Kate Markgraf) reinstated all youth-level teams in their own right.

== Competitive record ==
=== FIFA U-19 Women's World Championship ===
| Year | Result | Matches | Wins | Draws | Losses | GF | GA | Coach |
|---|---|---|---|---|---|---|---|---|
| (Canada) 2002 | See United States women's national under-20 soccer team | | | | | | | |
| (Thailand) 2004 | See United States women's national under-20 soccer team | | | | | | | |
| Total | 0/2 | | | | | | | |

=== Pan American Games ===
| Year | Result | Matches | Wins | Draws | Losses | GF | GA | Coach |
|---|---|---|---|---|---|---|---|---|
| (Chile) 2023 | Bronze medal | 5 | 4 | 0 | 1 | 16 | 3 | Carrie Kveton |
| Total | 1/1 | 5 | 4 | 0 | 1 | 16 | 3 | |

=== CONCACAF Women's U-19 Championship ===
| Year | Result | Matches | Wins | Draws | Losses | GF | GA | Coach |
|---|---|---|---|---|---|---|---|---|
| (Trinidad and Tobago) 2002 | See United States women's national under-20 soccer team | | | | | | | |
| (Canada) 2004 | See United States women's national under-20 soccer team | | | | | | | |
| Total | 0/2 | | | | | | | |

== Recent schedule and results ==
=== 2025 ===
| October 25 Friendly | Republic of Ireland | 0–1 | United States | Setúbal, Portugal |
| | | Report | McKeen 78' | Stadium: Complexo Municipal de Atletismo Carla Sacramento; Referee: Bruna Pico (POR) |

| October 28 Friendly | Portugal | 3–3 | United States | Setúbal, Portugal |
| | Tristao 36'; Nave 60'; Fernandes 65' | Report | McKeen 40', 45+1'; Ascanio 63' | Stadium: Estádio do Bonfim; Referee: Silvia Lizeu (POR) |

=== 2026 ===
| February 27 Friendly | Czech Republic | 0–2 | United States | Arouca, Portugal |
| | | Report | McLanahan 87'; Strawn 90' | Stadium: Estádio Municipal de Arouca |

| March 2 Friendly | Wales | 0–3 | United States | São João da Madeira, Portugal |
| | | Report | Puerta 13'; McLanahan 42' (pen.); Townes 76' | Stadium: Estádio Conde Dias Garcia |

| March 6 Friendly | Portugal | v | United States | Arouca, Portugal |
| | | | | Stadium: Estádio Municipal de Arouca |

| April 14 Friendly | Argentina | 0–2 | United States | Buenos Aires, Argentina |
| | | Report | Maxwell 4'; Stafford 88' | Stadium: Argentina Football Federation Training Center |

| April 17 Friendly | Argentina | 1–3 | United States | Buenos Aires, Argentina |
| | Paz 4' | Report | Johnson 29' (pen.), 49'; Maxwell 72' | Stadium: Argentina Football Federation Training Center |

| June 5 Friendly | Germany | 0–2 | United States | Frankfurt, Germany |
| | | Report | Kemmerley 7'; Stafford 86' | Stadium: DFB Campus; Referee: Selina Menzel (GER) |

| June 9 Friendly | Germany | 1–0 | United States | Frankfurt, Germany |
| | Száraz 56' | Report | | Stadium: DFB Campus; Referee: Sina Gieringer (GER) |

== Players ==
=== Current squad ===
The following 20 players were called up for the June/July training camp.

Caps and goals are updated as of June 9, 2026 after the match against Germany.

| No. | Pos. | Player | Date of birth (age) | Caps | Goals | Club |
|---|---|---|---|---|---|---|
| 12 | GK | Daphne Nakfoor | (18) | 4 | 0 | (United States Soccer Federation) UCLA |
| | GK | Nyamma Nelson | (18) | 0 | 0 | (United States Soccer Federation) Northwestern |
| | GK | Lizzie Thornton | June 3, 2007 (age 19) | 2 | 0 | (United States Soccer Federation) Wake Forest |
| 3 | DF | Bella Devey | April 23, 2007 (age 19) | 6 | 0 | (United States Soccer Federation) North Carolina |
| 4 | DF | Edra Bello | August 6, 2007 (age 19) | 4 | 0 | (United States Soccer Federation) Duke |
| 13 | DF | Daya King | October 1, 2007 (age 19) | 4 | 0 | (United States Soccer Federation) Duke |
| 16 | DF | Jordyn Hardeman | May 5, 2007 (age 19) | 4 | 0 | (United States Soccer Federation) Virginia |
| 20 | DF | Hannah Jordan | (18) | 2 | 0 | (United States Soccer Federation) Penn State |
| | DF | Kiara Gilmore | February 11, 2007 (age 19) | 3 | 0 | (United States Soccer Federation) Wisconsin |
| | DF | Maddy Herniter | June 4, 2007 (age 19) | 4 | 0 | (United States Soccer Federation) Georgia |
| | DF | Leena Powell | October 3, 2007 (age 19) | 0 | 0 | (United States Soccer Federation) UCLA |
| 18 | MF | Riley Cross | September 17, 2007 (age 19) | 6 | 0 | (United States Soccer Federation) DC Power |
| | MF | Noe Johnson | July 20, 2007 (age 19) | 6 | 0 | (United States Soccer Federation) Stanford |
| | MF | Mia Lopez | (18) | 2 | 0 | (United States Soccer Federation) Utah State |
| | MF | Kennedy Ring | January 9, 2007 (age 19) | 2 | 0 | (United States Soccer Federation) Penn State |
| | MF | Grace Shank | (18) | 0 | 0 | (United States Soccer Federation) UCLA |
| | MF | Paige Thompson | May 16, 2008 (age 18) | 2 | 0 | (United States Soccer Federation) Alabama |
| 9 | FW | Rylee McLanahan | August 14, 2007 (age 19) | 5 | 2 | (United States Soccer Federation) Duke |
| 11 | FW | Olivia Stafford | (18) | 4 | 2 | (United States Soccer Federation) Vanderbilt |
| | FW | Eres Freifeld | (18) | 0 | 0 | (United States Soccer Federation) Wake Forest |
| | FW | Carrie Helfrich | July 2, 2007 (age 19) | 0 | 0 | (United States Soccer Federation) Virginia |
| | FW | Ayva Jordan | October 24, 2007 (age 19) | 0 | 0 | (United States Soccer Federation) Tennessee |
| | FW | Rylee McLanahan | August 14, 2007 (age 19) | 0 | 0 | (United States Soccer Federation) Duke |
| | FW | Mya Townes | July 29, 2007 (age 19) | 4 | 1 | (United States Soccer Federation) Georgia |
| | FW | Grace White | (18) | 0 | 0 | (United States Soccer Federation) Baylor |

=== Recent call-ups ===
The following players were named to a squad in the last 12 months.

- June 2026 friendlies.
- April 2026 friendlies.
- February/March 2026 friendlies.
- November/December 2025 training camp.

| Pos. | Player | Date of birth (age) | Caps | Goals | Club | Latest call-up |
|---|---|---|---|---|---|---|
| GK | Evan O'Steen | March 22, 2008 (aged 17) | 1 | 0 | (United States) Seattle Reign FC | April 2026 friendlies |
| GK | Josie Biehl | January 2, 2008 (age 18) | 1 | 0 | (United States) San Diego Surf SC | November/December 2025 training camp |
| GK | Elli Johnson | (18) | 0 | 0 | (United States) Real Colorado | November/December 2025 training camp |
| DF | Jaida McGrew | July 3, 2007 (age 19) | 4 | 0 | (United States) Florida State | June 2026 friendlies |
| DF | Pearl Cecil | January 24, 2008 (age 18) | 6 | 0 | (United States) Virginia Cavaliers | June 2026 friendlies |
| DF | Gracie Milam | January 13, 2009 (age 17) | 2 | 0 | (United States) Lou Fusz Athletic | June 2026 friendlies |
| DF | Jocelyn Travers | October 10, 2007 (age 19) | 2 | 0 | (United States) Duke | February/March 2026 friendlies |
| DF | Ella Bard | March 21, 2007 (age 19) | 4 | 0 | (United States) USC | February/March 2026 friendlies |
| DF | Lexi Coughlin | July 21, 2007 (age 19) | 0 | 0 | (United States) Duke | February/March 2026 friendlies |
| DF | Braelyn Even | (17) | 2 | 0 | (United States) Ohio Elite SA | November/December 2025 training camp |
| DF | Brynna Burrus | (17) | 0 | 0 | (United States) Tophat SC | November/December 2025 training camp |
| DF | Ryana Dill | (17) | 0 | 0 | (United States) Bethesda SC | November/December 2025 training camp |
| DF | Claire Kessenger | (18) | 0 | 0 | (Spain) CE Europa Femenino | November/December 2025 training camp |
| DF | Nina Laba | (18) | 0 | 0 | (United States) Michigan Hawks | November/December 2025 training camp |
| DF | Gracie Milam | (18) | 0 | 0 | (United States) Lou Fusz Athletic | November/December 2025 training camp |
| DF | Ana Ramirez | (18) | 0 | 0 | (United States) Lou Fusz Athletic | November/December 2025 training camp |
| MF | Keira Kemmerley | March 9, 2007 (age 19) | 6 | 1 | (United States) Northwestern | June 2026 friendlies |
| MF | Adia Symmonds | June 29, 2007 (age 19) | 4 | 0 | (United States) Florida | June 2026 friendlies |
| MF | Ashlyn Puerta | February 27, 2007 (age 19) | 4 | 1 | (United States) Sporting JAX | June 2026 friendlies |
| MF | Nyanya Touray | July 25, 2008 (age 18) | 2 | 0 | (United States) Florida State Seminoles | February/March 2026 friendlies |
| MF | Brooke Bunton | (18) | 0 | 0 | (United States) SMU | November/December 2025 training camp |
| MF | Brianna Concepcion | (18) | 0 | 0 | (United States) STA | November/December 2025 training camp |
| MF | Addison Feldman | (17) | 0 | 0 | (United States) Utah Celtic FC | November/December 2025 training camp |
| MF | Lael Hill | (17) | 0 | 0 | (United States) Orlando City Academy | November/December 2025 training camp |
| FW | Ella Kral | (17) | 0 | 0 | (United States) Lamorinda SC | November/December 2025 training camp |
| FW | Sealey Strawn | October 1, 2007 (age 19) | 5 | 1 | (United States) Dallas Trinity FC | June 2026 friendlies |
| FW | Maddie Padelski | September 29, 2007 (age 19) | 2 | 0 | (United States) Portland Thorns | June 2026 friendlies |
| FW | Kylie Maxwell | (18) | 4 | 2 | (United States) Wake Forest | June 2026 friendlies |
| FW | Lauren Malsom | March 14, 2008 (age 18) | 6 | 0 | (United States) North Carolina Tar Heels | June 2026 friendlies |
| FW | Micayla Johnson | January 18, 2008 (age 18) | 4 | 2 | (United States) Chicago Stars FC | April 2026 friendlies |
| FW | Melanie Barcenas | October 30, 2007 (age 19) | 2 | 0 | (United States) San Diego Wave FC | April 2026 friendlies |
| FW | Avery Oder | April 7, 2007 (age 19) | 2 | 0 | (United States) Duke | February/March 2026 friendlies |
| FW | Sariyah Bailey | (18) | 2 | 0 | (United States) LSU | February/March 2026 friendlies |
| FW | Audrey McKeen | November 26, 2008 (age 17) | 2 | 3 | (United States) Racing Louisville FC | November/December 2025 training camp |
| FW | Kate Kemmerley | March 9, 2007 (age 19) | 2 | 0 | (United States) Penn Fusion SA | November/December 2025 training camp |
| FW | Anna Babcock | October 6, 2007 (age 19) | 2 | 0 | (United States) Crossfire Premier SC | November/December 2025 training camp |
| FW | Alison Ernst | (17) | 0 | 0 | (United States) Michigan Hawks | November/December 2025 training camp |
| FW | Lily Jeakle | (17) | 0 | 0 | (United States) Nationals SC | November/December 2025 training camp |
| FW | Emery O'Donnell | (16) | 2 | 0 | (United States) FC Stars Blue | November/December 2025 training camp |

== Coaches ==
- (United States) Tracey Leone (2001–2004)
- (United States) Mark Krikorian (2004)
- (Czech Republic) Jitka Klimková (2015–2017)
- (United States) Twila Kaufman (2020)
- (United States) Carrie Kveton (2023– )
