= Adia Symmonds =

American soccer player (born 2007)

Personal information
- Full name: Adia Lorwen Symmonds
- Date of birth: June 29, 2007 (age 19)
- Place of birth: Clearwater, Florida, U.S.
- Height: 5 ft 4 in (1.63 m)
- Position: Midfielder

Team information
- Current team: Florida Gators
- Number: 8

Youth career
- Florida Premier FC

College career
Years	Team	Apps	(Gls)
2025	Mississippi State Bulldogs	19	(2)
2026–	Florida Gators	11	(1)

International career^{‡}
2025–	United States U-19	2	(0)
- ‡ National team caps and goals as of 00:08, September 12, 2026 (UTC)

Adia Lorwen Symmonds (born June 29, 2007) is an American college soccer player who plays as a midfielder for the Florida Gators. She previously played for the Mississippi State Bulldogs.

== Early life ==
Symmonds was born in Clearwater, Florida, one of three daughters born to Liam and Keisha Symmonds. She played high school soccer at Sunlake High School in Land O' Lakes, Florida, and led the team to their first state tournament appearance, scoring 45 goals and 37 assists over three seasons. During high school, she also had a trial with Arsenal's academy in London. She committed to play college soccer for the Mississippi State Bulldogs in her junior year. She played club soccer for Florida Premier FC, being named an ECNL all-conference selection.

== College career ==
Symmonds enrolled early at Mississippi State University in the spring of 2025. She started all 19 games for which she was available as a freshman, scored 2 goals, and had 4 assists, earning a spot on the Southeastern Conference (SEC) all-freshman team. After the season, she followed Mississippi State head coach Nick Zimmerman and transferred to the University of Florida.

== International career ==
Symmonds has United States and English citizenship, making her eligible to represent either country internationally. She made her international debut for the United States under-19 team in October 2025.

== Honors and awards ==
Individual

- Second-team All-SEC: 2026
- SEC all-freshman team: 2025
