= Alexa Soto =

Mexican football player (born 2007)

Personal information
- Full name: Alexa Soto Ramirez
- Date of birth: 20 March 2007 (age 19)
- Place of birth: Texas, United States
- Height: 1.60 m (5 ft 3 in)
- Position: Midfielder

Team information
- Current team: América
- Number: 14

Youth career
- 2021–2024: América

Senior career*
| Years | Team | Apps | (Gls) |
| 2024– | América | 47 | (8) |

International career^{‡}
| 2022 | Mexico U-15 | | |
| 2024 | Mexico U-17 | 8 | (2) |
| 2025– | Mexico U-20 | 5 | (0) |
- * Club domestic league appearances and goals as of 24 May 2026 ‡ National team caps and goals as of 7 July 2025

Alexa Soto Ramírez (born 20 March 2007) is a Mexican professional footballer who plays as a midfielder for Liga MX Femenil side Club América.

== Club career ==
=== América (2021–present) ===
Before getting promoted to the senior team, Soto spent three years playing for América's youth academy in Liga MX Femenil youth divisions. She made her professional debut with América during the Clausura 2024 tournament at age 17 on 16 February 2024 while she was still part of the academy, in a match against Mazatlan in which she was part of the starting lineup.

Soto was officially promoted to América's first team ahead of the 2024-25 season. She netted her first goal with América during the Apertura 2024 tournament, in a 8–1 victory against Mazatlán, a game in which she was initially part of the bench.

While Soto received very little play time with América for most of the 2024–25 season, she became an important player for the team near the end of the Clausura 2025 tournament due to a seizable number of teammates being unable to play due to injury. During this period, Soto received the opportunity to start in a number of games during the playoffs, including the semifinals against América's national rival, Chivas.

== International career ==
Soto has been part of the Mexico women's national team youth football program since the U-15 category. She competed with the Mexico women's national under-17 football team in the 2024 CONCACAF Women's U-17 Championship, and the 2024 FIFA U-17 Women's World Cup. Since 2025, she has been part of the Mexico under-20 football team, and playing with the team in the 2025 CONCACAF Women's U-20 Championship.

== Career statistics ==
=== Club ===
As of As of match played 12 April 2025

Appearances and goals by club, season and competition
| Club | Season | League | | | Continental (Note: Includes CONCACAF W Champions Cup) | | Total | |
| Club | Season | Division | Apps | Goals | Apps | Goals | Apps | Goals |
|---|---|---|---|---|---|---|---|---|
| Club América | 2023–24 | Liga MX Femenil | 2 | 0 | — | | 2 | 0 |
| Club América | 2024–25 | Liga MX Femenil | 18 | 3 | 1 | 0 | 19 | 3 |
| Club América | Total | | 20 | 3 | 1 | 0 | 21 | 3 |
| Career total | | | 20 | 3 | 1 | 0 | 21 | 3 |

== Honours ==
Club América

- Liga MX Femenil: Clausura 2026
- CONCACAF W Champions Cup: 2025–26
