= Jocelyn Travers =

American soccer player (born 2007)

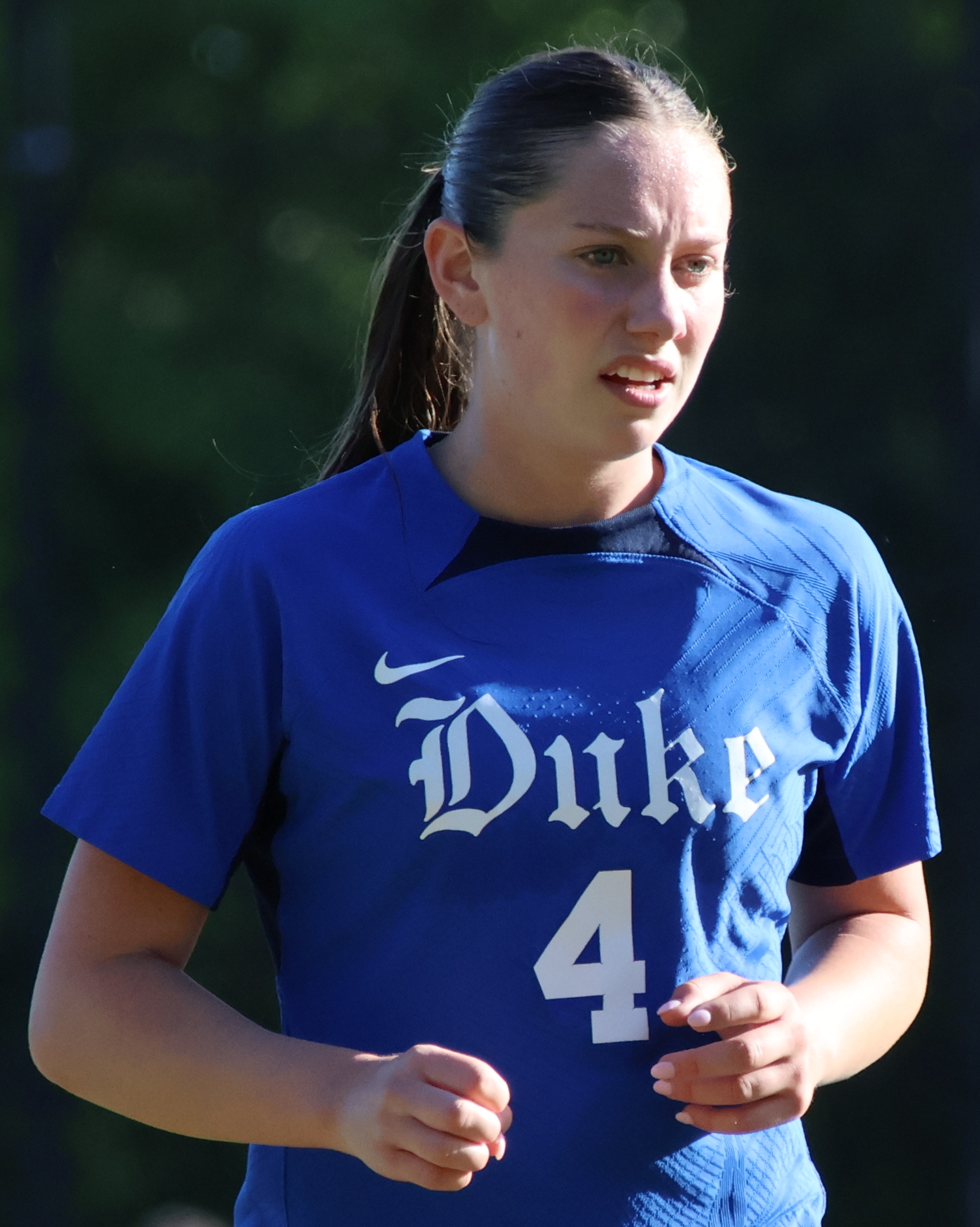
- Travers with Duke in 2026

Personal information
- Full name: Jocelyn Elise Travers
- Date of birth: October 10, 2007 (age 19)
- Place of birth: Santa Cruz, California, U.S.
- Height: 5 ft 5 in (1.65 m)
- Positions: Left back; wingback

Team information
- Current team: Duke Blue Devils
- Number: 4

Youth career
- Bay Area Surf

College career
Years	Team	Apps	(Gls)
2025–	Duke Blue Devils	37	(2)

International career^{‡}
2023	United States U-15		
2024	United States U-17	11	(1)
2026–	United States U-19	2	(0)
Medal record
Women's soccer
FIFA U-17 Women's World Cup
Bronze medal – third place	Dominican Republic 2024
- ‡ National team caps and goals as of November 3, 2024

Jocelyn Elise Travers (born October 10, 2007) is an American college soccer player who plays as a left back for the Duke Blue Devils. She won bronze with the United States at the 2024 FIFA U-17 Women's World Cup.

== Early life ==
Travers was born and raised in Santa Cruz, California. In her freshman season at Santa Cruz High School, she helped the team reach the CIF Central Coast Section Division I title game in 2022. She was named the Santa Cruz County Co-Player of the Year after scoring 24 goals from the midfield in 2023. She played club soccer for Bay Area Surf, earning ECNL All-American honors twice. Before college, she trained with Gotham FC in the 2025 preseason. She was ranked by TopDrawerSoccer as the No. 15 prospect of the 2025 class, part of Duke's top-ranked recruiting class.

== College career ==
Travers started in her college debut for the Duke Blue Devils as a freshman in 2025. She finished her freshman season with 21 games played, starting 13, and 1 goal. In the NCAA tournament, she started all five games and had two assists as the Blue Devils reached the semifinals, losing to Stanford.

== International career ==
Travers began training with the United States under-15 team in 2022. She was a training player in the build-up to the 2022 CONCACAF Girls' U-15 Championship and later trained with the under-16 team. She helped the under-17s win the 2024 CONCACAF Women's U-17 Championship, appearing in three games and making two starts. She played every minute of the 2024 FIFA U-17 Women's World Cup, contributing to four shutouts in six games as the United States finished in third place, its best result since 2008.

== Personal life ==
Travers is the daughter of Bruce and Julie Travers and has four siblings.

== Honors and awards ==
United States U-17

- CONCACAF Women's U-17 Championship: 2024
- FIFA U-17 Women's World Cup bronze medal: 2024

Individual

- Third-team All-ACC: 2026
