= Momo Saruang Ueki Sato =

Japanese footballer (born 2007)

Personal information
- Date of birth: 27 July 2007 (age 19)
- Place of birth: Japan
- Height: 1.59 m (5 ft 3 in)
- Position: Forward

Team information
- Current team: Daisho Gakuen High School

Youth career
- Daisho Gakuen High School

International career
Years	Team	Apps	(Gls)
2022	Japan U15		
2024–	Japan U17		

Momo Saruang Ueki Sato (Japanese: 佐藤ももサロワンウエキ; born 27 July 2007) is a Japanese professional footballer who plays as a forward for Daisho Gakuen High School.

== Early life ==
Ueki Sato was born on 27 July 2007. Born to a Palauan father and a Japanese mother, she started playing football at the age of eight. Growing up, she attended Daisho Gakuen High School in Japan.

== International career ==
Ueki Sato is a Japan youth international. During October and November 2024, she played for the Japan women's national under-17 football team at the 2024 FIFA U-17 Women's World Cup.

== Style of play ==
Ueki Sato plays as a forward. American news website Goal wrote in 2025 that she is a "versatile forward whose ability to use both feet helps to make her a clinical finisher, as does... [her] remarkable calmness in front of goal".
