= Juju Harris (footballer) =

Brazilian footballer (born 2007)

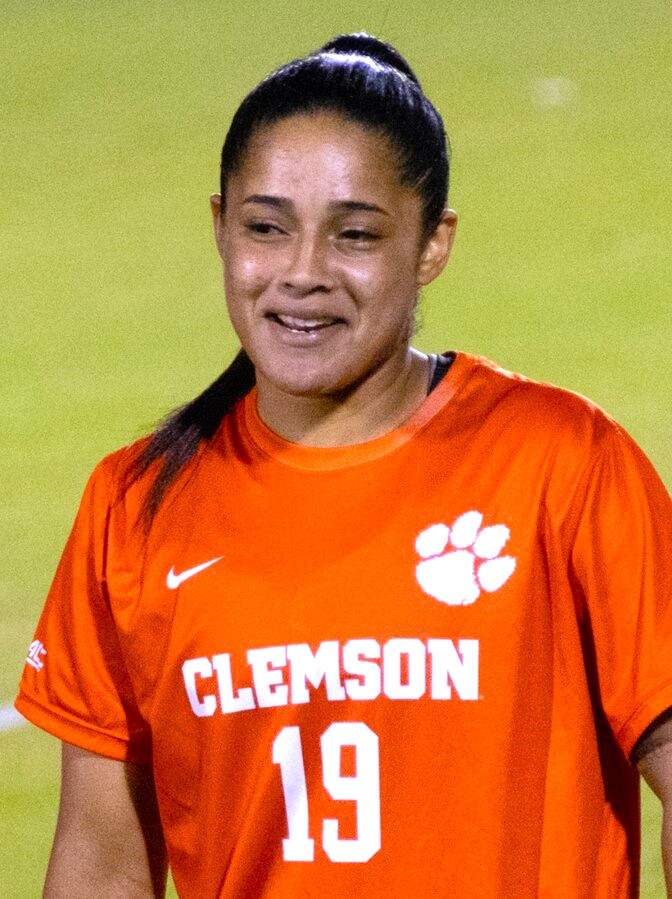
- Harris with Clemson in 2025

Personal information
- Full name: Juliana Melo Harris
- Date of birth: 18 January 2007 (age 19)
- Place of birth: Virginia, United States
- Height: 1.73 m (5 ft 8 in)
- Position: Forward

Team information
- Current team: Clemson Tigers
- Number: 19

College career
Years	Team	Apps	(Gls)
2025–	Clemson Tigers	18	(7)

International career^{‡}
2022–2024	Brazil U-17	15	(8)
- ‡ National team caps and goals as of 23 October 2024

Juliana "Juju" Melo Harris (born 18 January 2007) is a college soccer player who plays as a forward for the Clemson Tigers. Born in the United States, she is a youth international for Brazil.

== Early life ==
Born in Virginia to a Brazilian mother and an American father, Harris began playing football at age three or four. Her family soon moved to Florida, where she played for club teams up several age groups and eventually trained with boys' teams. She was one of the top players in the Girls Academy with Florida United. She initially committed to play college soccer at Florida State before changing her commitment to Clemson. She also trained as a non-roster invitee with the NWSL's Seattle Reign FC and Washington Spirit. She was ranked by TopDrawerSoccer as the ninth-best prospect of the 2025 class.

== College career ==
Harris scored 7 goals in 18 games for the Clemson Tigers as a freshman in 2025, earning third-team All-ACC honors.

== International career ==
Eligible to represent Brazil or the United States, Harris was invited to train with the United States under-15 team before being selected to the Brazil under-17s at the 2022 FIFA U-17 Women's World Cup. Two years later, she was the top scorer alongside Giovanna Waksman at the 2024 South American U-17 Women's Championship, scoring five goals in seven games as Brazil won the tournament. She was Brazil's only scorer at the 2024 FIFA U-17 Women's World Cup, with two goals in three games.

== Honors and awards ==
Brazil U-17

- South American Under-17 Women's Football Championship: 2024

Individual

- Third-team All-ACC: 2025
- South American Under-17 Women's Football Championship Golden Boot: 2024
