= Paula Comendador =

Spanish footballer (born 2007)

- Comendador with Real Madrid B in 2025

Personal information
- Full name: Paula Comendador Prado
- Date of birth: 12 January 2007 (age 19)
- Place of birth: Madrid, Spain
- Height: 1.66 m (5 ft 5 in)
- Positions: Forward; left wing

Team information
- Current team: Real Madrid
- Number: 5

Youth career
- 2015–2021: Madrid CFF
- 2021–2023: Real Madrid

Senior career*
Years	Team	Apps	(Gls)
2023–2025	Real Madrid B	52	(13)
2023–	Real Madrid	20	(3)

International career^{‡}
2022–2024	Spain U17	29	(13)
2024–2026	Spain U19	17	(6)
2026–	Spain U20	12	(6)
2024-	Spain U23	2	(0)
Medal record
Women's football
Representing Spain
FIFA U-20 Women's World Cup
Winner	2026 Poland
UEFA Women's Under-19 Championship
Winner	2024 Lithuania
Winner	2025 Poland
FIFA U-17 Women's World Cup
Runner-up	2024 Dominican Republic
UEFA Women's Under-17 Championship
Runner-up	2023 Estonia
- * Club domestic league appearances and goals as of 17:25, 27 May 2026 (UTC) ‡ National team caps and goals as of 17:25, 26 July 2025 (UTC)

Paula Comendador Prado (born 12 January 2007) is a Spanish professional footballer who plays as a forward for Liga F club Real Madrid.

== Club career ==
Pau joined Madrid CFF at the age of eight. She spent six seasons at the club before becoming a part of Real Madrid Femenino in the summer of 2021, where she initially played for the U-16s and won the Madrid Championship. In the 2022–23 season, she was part of the A-Juvenil squad and won the title in her category again with the Merengues. On 10 September 2023, she made her debut for the B team in a match against Rayo Vallecano of the Second Federation.

Comendador made her debut for Real Madrid's first squad on 26 November 2023, in a Liga F match against Sporting de Huelva, coming on as a second-half substitute for Hayley Raso.

On 25 May 2025, Comendador's team won the Torneo Juvenil Femenino for the second year in a row, scoring the only goal in the final, a 1–0 win over Barcelona Juvenil. Comendador was named the tournament's MVP after scoring five goals in four matches.

Pau was promoted to the Real Madrid first team on July 24, 2025. Signing a contract until 2027, becoming the 2nd ever academy player to get promoted to the first team after Carla Camacho in 2023. She will wear the number 5 shirt for the 2025-26 season.

She ended her first season with Real Madrid's first team with 2 goals in 22 matches, all coming in Liga F, including 6 starts. She played a total of 590 minutes, participated once in the Copa de la Reina, once in the Supercopa de España, and 4 times in the UEFA Women's Champions League.

== International career ==
Pau made her debut for the Spain Under-17 national team on 22 September 2022 during a 2023 Under-17 Euro qualifier against Belgium.

Pau was called up by Kenio Gonzalo for the 2023 UEFA Under-17 Championships, she started all 5 matches and scored once in a 3-1 win over England in the semi finals, she also started in the final where Spain lost 3-2 vs France.

Sonia Bermudez gave Pau her first Spain Under-19 call up on May 27, 2024 for two friendlies against the United States in Alicante. She made her Under-19 debut on May 31st, starting in the first game against the United States.

Pau made Sonia Bermudez's final list for the 2024 UEFA Women's Under-19 Championships as the only player in Spain's squad born in 2007 at 17 years and 176 days old. Pau scored her first goal of the tournament in a 2-0 must win over Germany in matchday 3. She scored again in the Semi final vs England in a 3-1 win, having did the same in 2023 at the Under-17 Euros. She started the final vs the Netherlands and played 74 minutes before being substituted by Daniela Arques. Spain were tied 1-1 and headed into extra time when a 118th minute winner by Intza Egiuguren Spain's sixth under-19 european title and their third in a row. overall, Pau started 4 matches and scored twice.

On October 3, 2024, Pau was called up by for the FIFA Women's Under-17 World Cup in the Dominican Republic, she started Spain's first game, a 3-1 over the United States. she scored her first goal of the tournament in a 5-0 win over South Korea. In matchday 3, Pau scored a hat-trick vs Ecuador with her first two goals coming in 3 minutes apart and her hat-trick was completed in the first minute after the restart. in the semi final vs England, Pau scored in a 3-0 win, it was her third time scoring vs England in a semifinal across 3 tournaments.

In the final vs North Korea, Pau played all 90 minutes as Spain were tied 1-1 and headed into penalties, Pau was third in line in the kicking order, she was one of two Spain players who missed their penalties along with Iris Ashley as her penalty went wide of the right post with North Korea winning 4-3 on penalties. Pau was awarded the Golden Boot as the top scorer with 5 goals and the Silver Ball as the second best player.

Pau received her first Spain U-23 call up on November 19, 2024 for friendlies against Germany and France in Unterhaching and Las Rozas. Pau was the youngest player in that squad at 17 years and 311 days old. she came off the bench in both matches. Spain lost 3-0 to Germany and won 3-2 vs France.

Pau was called up for round 2 of the 2025 UEFA Under-19 Euros qualifiers, she scored a first half hattrick in matchday 2 in an eventual 4–0 win over Scotland.

Pau was called up by Javier Lerga for the 2025 Women's Under-19 Championships, she started every match except the opening match vs Portugal which they ended up winning 2–0, Spain went on to beat France 4–0 in the final and retained the title for the 4th consecutive time, She assisted once in the tournament vs Italy.

Pau was omitted from Spain's final list for the 2026 UEFA Women's Under-19 Championship.

Pau received her first Spain U-20 call up on February 25, 2026 for friendlies against England, Mexico and the Netherlands in Alicante.

Pau was called up by David Aznar for the 2026 FIFA Under-20 Women's World Cup, she came off the bench in the 80th minute in their 2-0 debut win over Nigeria. Pau scored twice and provided an assist in Spain's 11-0 win over New Caledonia, vs China, Pau Scored 2 goals in Spain's 3-1 win and was named Player of the match.

Pau's goalscoring form continued when she scored the only goal against Brazil in the quarter final and led the golden boot race with 5 goals ahead of Annika Paz who also had 5 goals but had Comendador had a better minutes to goals ratio. In the Semi-Final vs Italy, Pau scored her sixth goal of the tournament, bettering her goalscoring tally from her 2024 FIFA Under-17 Women's World Cup Golden Boot win. in the final vs North Korea, Pau started and played the entire 90 minutes of normal time and was substituted by Marisa Garcia before extra time. both teams couldn't find the net in 120 minutes and went to penalties, Spain won 4-3 and were crowned World Champions at the Under-20 level for the second time.

Pau was awarded the Golden boot with 6 goals as the top scorer of the competition and the Bronze boot as the third best player, becoming the only player in history to win the golden boot at the Under-17 and Under-20 World Cup.

== Career statistics ==
As of match played 30 May 2026

Appearances and goals by club, season and competition
Club	Season	League			Copa de la Reina		Continental		Other		Total	
Club	Season	Division	Apps	Goals	Apps	Goals	Apps	Goals	Apps	Goals	Apps	Goals
Real Madrid B	2023–24	Segunda Federación	26	7	—		—		—		26	7
Real Madrid B	2024–25	Primera Federación	26	6	—		—		—		26	6
Real Madrid B	Total		52	13	—		—		—		52	13
Real Madrid	2023–24	Liga F	3	1	0	0	1 (Note: Appearance in UEFA Women's Champions League)	0	0	0	4	1
Real Madrid	2024–25	Liga F	1	0	0	0	0	0	0	0	1	0
Real Madrid	2025–26	Liga F	16	2	1	0	4	0	—		21	2
Real Madrid	Total		20	3	1	0	5	0	0	0	26	3
Career total			72	16	1	0	5	0	0	0	78	16

=== International ===
As of match played 27 September 2026

Appearances and goals by national team and year
Year	National team	Apps	Goals
2023	Spain U17	3	1
2024	Spain U17	11	6
2024	Spain U19	7	2
2024	Spain U23	2	0
2025	Spain U19	8	4
2026	Spain U20	12	6
Total		33	15

== Honours ==
Real Madrid Juvenil

- Torneo Juvenil Femenina: 2024, 2025

Real Madrid B

- Segunda Federacion: 2023–24

Real Madrid

- Liga F runner-up: 2023–24, 2025–26

Spain U17

- UEFA Women's Under-17 Championship runner-up: 2023
- FIFA U-17 Women's World Cup runner-up: 2024

Spain U19

- UEFA Women's Under-19 Championship: 2024, 2025

Spain U20

- FIFA U-20 Women's World Cup: 2026

Individual

- FIFA U-17 Women's World Cup Golden Boot: 2024
- FIFA U-17 Women's World Cup Silver Ball: 2024
- Torneo Juvenil Femenino Most Valuable Player: 2025
- FIFA U-20 Women's World Cup Golden Boot: 2026
- FIFA U-20 Women's World Cup Bronze Ball: 2026
