= Ana Elisa =

Brazilian politician (born 2005)

- Ana Elisa in 2026

Member of the Chamber of Deputies
- Incumbent
- Assumed office 1 February 2027
- Constituency: Minas Gerais

Personal details
- Born: 31 August 2005 (age 21)
- Party: Workers' Party (since 2026)

Ana Elisa Santos Silva (born 31 August 2005), known mononymously as Ana Elisa, is a Brazilian politician who was elected member of the Chamber of Deputies in 2026. She is the youngest-ever member to be elected from Minas Gerais.

== Biography ==
Santos Silva was born in Divinópolis, Minas Gerais, on 31 August 2005. She is a university student and a law student.

She gained prominence on social media for producing content related to politics. During the 2026 election campaign, she had around 1.9 million followers on Instagram.
