= 2024 FIFA U-17 Women's World Cup =

Copa Mundial Femenina Sub-17 de la FIFA República Dominicana 2024
- Unleash your Passion

Tournament details
- Host country: Dominican Republic
- Dates: 16 October – 3 November
- Teams: 16 (from 6 confederations)
- Venues: 2 (in 2 host cities)

Final positions
- Champions: North Korea (3rd title)
- Runners-up: Spain
- Third place: United States
- Fourth place: England

Tournament statistics
- Matches played: 32
- Goals scored: 94 (2.94 per match)
- Attendance: 94,636 (2,957 per match)
- Top scorer(s): (Spain) Pau Comendador (5 goals)
- Best player: (North Korea) Jon Il-chong
- Best goalkeeper: (United States) Evan O'Steen
- Fair play award: Nigeria

The 2024 FIFA U-17 Women's World Cup (Spanish: Copa Mundial Femenina Sub-17 de la FIFA República Dominicana 2024) was the eighth edition of the FIFA U-17 Women's World Cup, the biennial international women's youth football championship contested by the under-17 national teams of the member associations of FIFA. It was hosted by the Dominican Republic, the first FIFA tournament hosted by the country. This was the final edition to feature 16 teams before expanding to 24 teams in 2025. It was also the final edition to be held biannually.

Spain were the two-time defending champions. They were beaten in the final by North Korea on penalties.

== Host selection ==
Dominican Republic was announced as the 2024 Women's U-17 World Cup hosts following the FIFA Council meeting on 23 June 2023 in Zürich, Switzerland.

== Qualified teams ==
A total of 16 teams qualified for the final tournament. In addition to Dominican Republic who qualified automatically as hosts, the other 15 teams qualified from six separate continental competitions.

Confederation	Qualifying Tournament	Team	Appearance	Last appearance	Previous best performance
AFC (Asia) (3 teams)	2024 AFC U-17 Women's Asian Cup	Japan	8th	2022	Champions (2014)
AFC (Asia) (3 teams)	2024 AFC U-17 Women's Asian Cup	North Korea	7th	2018	Champions (2008, 2016)
AFC (Asia) (3 teams)	2024 AFC U-17 Women's Asian Cup	South Korea	4th	2018	Champions (2010)
CAF (Africa) (3 teams)	2024 African U-17 Women's World Cup Qualifying Tournament	Kenya	1st	None	Debut
CAF (Africa) (3 teams)	2024 African U-17 Women's World Cup Qualifying Tournament	Nigeria	7th	2022	Third place (2022)
CAF (Africa) (3 teams)	2024 African U-17 Women's World Cup Qualifying Tournament	Zambia	2nd	2014	Group stage (2014)
CONCACAF (North, Central America & Caribbean) (Hosts + 2 teams)	Host nation	Dominican Republic	1st	None	Debut
CONCACAF (North, Central America & Caribbean) (Hosts + 2 teams)	2024 CONCACAF Women's U-17 Championship	Mexico	7th	2022	Runners-up (2018)
CONCACAF (North, Central America & Caribbean) (Hosts + 2 teams)	2024 CONCACAF Women's U-17 Championship	United States	6th	2022	Runners-up (2008)
CONMEBOL (South America) (3 teams)	2024 South American U-17 Women's Championship	Brazil	7th	2022	Quarter-finals (2010, 2012, 2022)
CONMEBOL (South America) (3 teams)	2024 South American U-17 Women's Championship	Colombia	6th	2022	Runners-up (2022)
CONMEBOL (South America) (3 teams)	2024 South American U-17 Women's Championship	Ecuador	1st	None	Debut
OFC (Oceania) (1 team)	2023 OFC U-16 Women's Championship	New Zealand	8th	2022	Third place (2018)
UEFA (Europe) (3 teams)	2024 UEFA Women's U-17 Championship	England	3rd	2016	Fourth place (2008)
UEFA (Europe) (3 teams)	2024 UEFA Women's U-17 Championship	Poland	1st	None	Debut
UEFA (Europe) (3 teams)	2024 UEFA Women's U-17 Championship	Spain	6th	2022	Champions (2018, 2022)

== Venues ==
The cities of Santiago de los Caballeros and Santo Domingo were confirmed by Dominican Football Federation on 29 April 2024 to host the competition.

Location of the host cities of the FIFA U-17 Women's World Cup Dominican Republic 2024.

- 1 Santiago de los Caballeros
- 2 Santo Domingo

2024 FIFA U-17 Women's World Cup venues
Santiago de los Caballeros	Santo Domingo
Estadio Cibao FC	Estadio Félix Sánchez
Capacity: 8,000	Capacity: 27,000

== Draw ==
The official draw took place on 22 June 2024 at the Monument to Fray Anton de Montesinos in Santo Domingo. The teams were allocated based on their performances in the five previous U-17 Women's World Cups, five bonus points added to the qualifying tournament winners (for this cycle). The host team, Dominican Republic, was automatically seeded and assigned to position A1. Teams of the same confederation were drawn so as to not meet in the group stage.

Pot 1	Pot 2	Pot 3	Pot 4
Dominican Republic ^{H} Spain; Japan; North Korea	United States; Brazil; Mexico; New Zealand	Nigeria; Colombia; England; Zambia	South Korea; Poland; Ecuador; Kenya

== Squads ==
Players born between 1 January 2007 and 31 December 2009 were eligible to compete in the tournament.

== Match officials ==
A total of 12 referees, 24 assistant referees and 2 support referees were appointed officially by FIFA for the tournament on 16 August 2024. The Football Video Support (FVS) system was utilized for the first time in a FIFA U-17 Women's World Cup.

Originally, Milagros Arruela (Peru) was selected for the tournament, but she was later replaced by Bolivia's Alejandra Quisbert. Olatz Rivera (Spain) was originally only assigned as support referee. However, she was assigned as principal referee during the tournament.

Confederation	Referees	Assistant referees
AFC	(Japan) Asaka Koizumi (Vietnam) Lê Thị Ly	(India) Riiohlang Dhar (Thailand) Suwida Wongkraisorn (United Arab Emirates) Amal Jamal Badhafari (Vietnam) Hà Thị Phượng
CAF	(Algeria) Ghada Mehat (Uganda) Shamirah Nabadda	(Egypt) Yara Abdelfattah (Mali) Fanta Koné (Morocco) Soukaina Hamdi (Zambia) Nancy Kasitu
CONCACAF	(Canada) Carly Shaw-MacLaren (Costa Rica) Deily Gómez	(Canada) Gabrielle Lemieux (Costa Rica) Kindria María Agüero (Costa Rica) Gabriela Jiménez (United States) Katarzyna Wasiak
CONMEBOL	(Bolivia) Alejandra Quisbert (Brazil) Daiane Muniz dos Santos	(Brazil) Fernanda Gomes Antunes (Brazil) Maíra Mastella Moreira (Peru) Gabriela Moreno (Peru) Vera Yupanqui
UEFA	(Denmark) Frida Klarlund (England) Abigail Byrne (Romania) Ionela Alina Peșu (Serbia) Jelena Cvetković	(Andorra) Ainhoa Fernández (Austria) Lena Hirtl (Denmark) Fie Bruun (Estonia) Karolin Kaivoja (Hungary) Anita Vad (Poland) Paulina Baranowska (Romania) Daniela Constantinescu (Wales) Ceri Louise Williams

Support referees
CONCACAF	(Dominican Republic) Vimarest Díaz
UEFA	(Spain) Olatz Rivera

== Group stage ==
The draw for the group stage took place on 22 June 2024.

All times are local, AST (UTC−4).

Tie-breaking criteria for group play
The ranking of teams in the group stage was determined as follows:
1. Points obtained in all group matches;
2. Goal difference in all group matches;
3. Number of goals scored in all group matches;
4. Points obtained in the matches played between the teams in question;
5. Goal difference in the matches played between the teams in question;
6. Number of goals scored in the matches played between the teams in question;
7. Fair play points in all group matches (only one deduction could be applied to a player in a single match):
  - Yellow card: −1 points;
  - Indirect red card (second yellow card): −3 points;
  - Direct red card: −4 points;
  - Yellow card and direct red card: −5 points;
8. Drawing of lots.

=== Group A ===
Pos	Team	Pld	W	D	L	GF	GA	GD	Pts	Qualification
1	Nigeria	3	3	0	0	9	1	+8	9	Knockout stage
2	Ecuador	3	2	0	1	6	4	+2	6	Knockout stage
3	Dominican Republic (H)	3	0	1	2	1	4	−3	1	
4	New Zealand	3	0	1	2	2	9	−7	1	

Source: FIFA
Rules for classification: Group stage tiebreakers
(H) Hosts
16 October 2024
16:00

New Zealand	1–4	Nigeria
Saxon 60'	Report	Moshood 2'; Adegoke 13'; Abdulwahab 28'; Afolabi 55'

Estadio Cibao FC, Santiago de los Caballeros
Attendance: 1,040
Referee: Olatz Rivera (Spain)
16 October 2024
19:00

Dominican Republic	0–2	Ecuador
	Report	Valverde 14', 29'

Estadio Cibao FC, Santiago de los Caballeros
Attendance: 3,006
Referee: Abigail Byrne (England)

19 October 2024
16:00

Nigeria	4–0	Ecuador
Moshood 28' (pen.), 90+6'; Chidi 54'; Effiong 66'	Report

Estadio Cibao FC, Santiago de los Caballeros
Attendance: 787
Referee: Frida Klarlund (Denmark)
19 October 2024
19:00

Dominican Republic	1–1	New Zealand
Brito 68'	Report	Mercedes 61' (o.g.)

Estadio Cibao FC, Santiago de los Caballeros
Attendance: 3,258
Referee: Asaka Koizumi (Japan)

22 October 2024
19:00

Nigeria	1–0	Dominican Republic
Moshood 89'	Report

Estadio Félix Sánchez, Santo Domingo
Attendance: 13,535
Referee: Daiane Muniz (Brazil)
22 October 2024
19:00

Ecuador	4–0	New Zealand
Arboleda 41'; Chiuchiolo 43', 49'; Morán 79'	Report

Estadio Cibao FC, Santiago de los Caballeros
Attendance: 1,248
Referee: Lê Thị Ly (Vietnam)

=== Group B ===
Pos	Team	Pld	W	D	L	GF	GA	GD	Pts	Qualification
1	Spain	3	3	0	0	10	2	+8	9	Knockout stage
2	United States	3	2	0	1	8	3	+5	6	Knockout stage
3	Colombia	3	0	1	2	2	5	−3	1	
4	South Korea	3	0	1	2	1	11	−10	1	

Source: FIFA
Rules for classification: Group stage tiebreakers
16 October 2024
16:00

Spain	3–1	United States
Travers 3' (o.g.); Ortega 70'; Cerrato 83'	Report	Barcenas 22'

Estadio Félix Sánchez, Santo Domingo
Attendance: 3,234
Referee: Asaka Koizumi (Japan)
16 October 2024
19:00

South Korea	1–1	Colombia
Phair 36' (pen.)	Report	Martínez 28'

Estadio Félix Sánchez, Santo Domingo
Attendance: 2,174
Referee: Shamirah Nabadda (Uganda)

19 October 2024
16:00

Spain	5–0	South Korea
Comendador 7'; Segura 32'; Santiago 45+4'; Moreno 47' (pen.); A. Gómez 90+3'	Report

Estadio Félix Sánchez, Santo Domingo
Attendance: 3,742
Referee: Ghada Mehat (Algeria)
19 October 2024
19:00

Colombia	0–2	United States
	Report	Johnson 43'; Fuller 58' (pen.)

Estadio Félix Sánchez, Santo Domingo
Attendance: 6,334
Referee: Alina Peșu (Romania)

22 October 2024
16:00

United States	5–0	South Korea
Barcenas 1', 47'; Fuller 10'; Long 68'; Padelski 87'	Report

Estadio Cibao FC, Santiago de los Caballeros
Attendance: 784
Referee: Alejandra Quisbert (Bolivia)
22 October 2024
16:00

Colombia	1–2	Spain
Díaz 5'	Report	García 58' (pen.); Santiago 90'

Estadio Félix Sánchez, Santo Domingo
Attendance: 4,566
Referee: Carly Shaw-MacLaren (Canada)

=== Group C ===
Pos	Team	Pld	W	D	L	GF	GA	GD	Pts	Qualification
1	North Korea	3	3	0	0	11	1	+10	9	Knockout stage
2	England	3	2	0	1	6	6	0	6	Knockout stage
3	Kenya	3	1	0	2	2	6	−4	3	
4	Mexico	3	0	0	3	4	10	−6	0	

Source: FIFA
Rules for classification: Group stage tiebreakers
17 October 2024
16:00

North Korea	4–1	Mexico
Choe Rim-jong 14', 34', 85'; Choe Il-son 26'	Report	Reyes 45'

Estadio Cibao FC, Santiago de los Caballeros
Attendance: 709
Referee: Daiane Muniz (Brazil)
17 October 2024
19:00

Kenya	0–2	England
	Report	Brown 29' (pen.); Thompson 87'

Estadio Cibao FC, Santiago de los Caballeros
Attendance: 777
Referee: Alejandra Quisbert (Bolivia)

20 October 2024
16:00

North Korea	3–0	Kenya
So Ryu-gyong 8', 11'; Ri Kuk-hyang 86'	Report

Estadio Cibao FC, Santiago de los Caballeros
Attendance: 1,022
Referee: Deily Gómez (Costa Rica)
20 October 2024
19:00

England	4–2	Mexico
Shaw 11'; Las 61'; Maltby 88'; Johnson 90+11'	Report	Salas 17'; Soto 50' (pen.)

Estadio Cibao FC, Santiago de los Caballeros
Attendance: 2,155
Referee: Shamirah Nabadda (Uganda)

23 October 2024
19:00

England	0–4	North Korea
	Report	Kang Ryu-mi 10'; Choe Il-son 18'; Ri Kuk-hyang 69' (pen.); Ho Kyong 73'

Estadio Cibao FC, Santiago de los Caballeros
Attendance: 754
Referee: Alina Peșu (Romania)
23 October 2024
19:00

Mexico	1–2	Kenya
Soto 90+2' (pen.)	Report	Nekesa 15'; Faith 36'

Estadio Félix Sánchez, Santo Domingo
Attendance: 852
Referee: Jelena Cvetković (Serbia)

=== Group D ===
Pos	Team	Pld	W	D	L	GF	GA	GD	Pts	Qualification
1	Japan	3	2	1	0	6	2	+4	7	Knockout stage
2	Poland	3	1	2	0	2	0	+2	5	Knockout stage
3	Brazil	3	1	1	1	2	2	0	4	
4	Zambia	3	0	0	3	1	7	−6	0	

Source: FIFA
Rules for classification: Group stage tiebreakers
17 October 2024
16:00

Japan	0–0	Poland
	Report

Estadio Félix Sánchez, Santo Domingo
Attendance: 587
Referee: Deily Gómez (Costa Rica)
17 October 2024
19:00

Brazil	1–0	Zambia
Juju 19'	Report

Estadio Félix Sánchez, Santo Domingo
Attendance: 470
Referee: Lê Thị Ly (Vietnam)

20 October 2024
16:00

Japan	2–1	Brazil
Sato 49'; Furuta 53'	Report	Juju 8'

Estadio Félix Sánchez, Santo Domingo
Attendance: 3,347
Referee: Abigail Byrne (England)
20 October 2024
19:00

Zambia	0–2	Poland
	Report	Wyrwas 7'; Araśniewicz 46'

Estadio Félix Sánchez, Santo Domingo
Attendance: 1,248
Referee: Jelena Cvetković (Serbia)

23 October 2024
16:00

Zambia	1–4	Japan
Suzuki 87' (o.g.)	Report	Shinjo 6', 69'; Sato 63' (pen.); Ota 86'

Estadio Félix Sánchez, Santo Domingo
Attendance: 891
Referee: Frida Klarlund (Denmark)
23 October 2024
16:00

Poland	0–0	Brazil
	Report

Estadio Cibao FC, Santiago de los Caballeros
Attendance: 673
Referee: Ghada Mehat (Algeria)

== Knockout stage ==
In the knockout stage, if a match was level at the end of normal playing time, no extra time was played and a penalty shoot-out was held to determine the winner.

=== Bracket ===
Quarter-finals
26 October – Santiago de los Caballeros
Nigeria	0
United States	2
26 October – Santiago de los Caballeros
North Korea	1
Poland	0
27 October – Santo Domingo
Spain	5
Ecuador	0
27 October – Santo Domingo
Japan	2 (1)
England (p)	2 (4)

Semi-finals
30 October – Santiago de los Caballeros
United States	0
North Korea	1
31 October – Santo Domingo
Spain	3
England	0

Final
3 November – Santo Domingo
North Korea (p)	1 (4)
Spain	1 (3)
Third place match
3 November – Santo Domingo
United States	3
England	0

=== Quarter-finals ===
26 October 2024
15:30

Nigeria	0–2	United States
	Report	Fuller 43' (pen.); Ascanio 74'

Estadio Cibao FC, Santiago de los Caballeros
Attendance: 1,022
Referee: Asaka Koizumi (Japan)

26 October 2024
19:00

North Korea	1–0	Poland
Choe Rim-jong 14'	Report

Estadio Cibao FC, Santiago de los Caballeros
Attendance: 2,112
Referee: Abigail Byrne (England)

27 October 2024
15:30

Spain	5–0	Ecuador
Comendador 35', 39', 46'; Segura 90+4', 90+8'	Report

Estadio Félix Sánchez, Santo Domingo
Attendance: 3,529
Referee: Jelena Cvetković (Serbia)

27 October 2024
19:00

Japan	2–2	England
Aoki 23'; Hirakawa 29'	Report	Parkinson 27'; Shaw 72'
Penalties
Aso (penalty missed); Nezu (penalty scored); Honda (penalty missed)	1–4	(penalty scored) Brown; (penalty scored) Maltby; (penalty scored) Harbert; (penalty scored) Shaw

Estadio Félix Sánchez, Santo Domingo
Attendance: 3,021
Referee: Carly Shaw-MacLaren (Canada)

=== Semi-finals ===
30 October 2024
19:00

United States	0–1	North Korea
	Report	Ro Un-hyang 69'

Estadio Cibao FC, Santiago de los Caballeros
Attendance: 2,408
Referee: Alina Peșu (Romania)

31 October 2024
19:00

Spain	3–0	England
Cerrato 45+2'; Comendador 58'; Shaw 90+9' (o.g.)	Report

Estadio Félix Sánchez, Santo Domingo
Attendance: 2,970
Referee: Asaka Koizumi (Japan)

=== Third place match ===
3 November 2024
14:30

United States	3–0	England
Fuller 24'; McCammon 72'; Padelski 90+2'	Report

Estadio Félix Sánchez, Santo Domingo
Attendance: 3,971
Referee: Alejandra Quisbert (Bolivia)

=== Final ===
3 November 2024
18:00

North Korea	1–1	Spain
Jon Il-chong 66'	Report	Segura 61'
Penalties
Ri Kuk-hyang (penalty scored); Jong Pok-yong (penalty missed); Ro Un-hyang (penalty scored); Jon Il-chong (penalty scored); Kang Ryu-mi (penalty scored)	4–3	(penalty scored) Segura; (penalty missed) Santiago; (penalty missed) Comendador; (penalty scored) Ortega; (penalty scored) Moreno

Estadio Félix Sánchez, Santo Domingo
Attendance: 18,410
Referee: Daiane Muniz (Brazil)

2024 FIFA U-17 Women's World Cup winners

North Korea
Third title

== Awards ==
The following awards were given for the tournament:

Golden Ball	Silver Ball	Bronze Ball
(North Korea) Jon Il-chong	(Spain) Pau Comendador	(Spain) Celia Segura
Golden Boot	Silver Boot	Bronze Boot
(Spain) Pau Comendador	(United States) Kennedy Fuller	(Spain) Celia Segura
5 goals	4 goals, 3 assists	4 goals, 2 assists, 406 minutes played
Golden Glove
(United States) Evan O'Steen
FIFA Fair Play Award
Nigeria

== Goalscorers ==
There were 94 goals scored in 32 matches, for an average of 2.94 goals per match.

5 goals

- (Spain) Pau Comendador

4 goals

- (Nigeria) Shakirat Moshood
- (North Korea) Choe Rim-jong
- (Spain) Celia Segura
- (United States) Kennedy Fuller

3 goals

- (United States) Mel Barcenas

2 goals

- (Brazil) Juju
- (Ecuador) Caprice Chiuchiolo
- (Ecuador) Jaslym Valverde
- (England) Zara Shaw
- (Japan) Momo Saruang Ueki Sato
- (Japan) Miharu Shinjo
- (Mexico) Alexa Soto
- (North Korea) Choe Il-son
- (North Korea) Ri Kuk-hyang
- (North Korea) So Ryu-gyong
- (Spain) Alba Cerrato
- (Spain) Iris Ashley Santiago
- (United States) Maddie Padelski

1 goal

- (Colombia) Isabella Díaz
- (Colombia) Ella Martínez
- (Dominican Republic) Yuleinis Brito
- (Ecuador) Doménica Arboleda
- (Ecuador) Dariana Morán
- (England) Lola Brown
- (England) Olivia Johnson
- (England) Nelly Las
- (England) Rachel Maltby
- (England) Erica Parkinson
- (England) Lauryn Thompson
- (Japan) Yuna Aoki
- (Japan) Asako Furuta
- (Japan) Hina Hirakawa
- (Japan) Mitsuki Ota
- (Kenya) Lornah Faith
- (Kenya) Valerie Nekesa
- (Mexico) Citlalli Reyes
- (Mexico) Ana Salas
- (New Zealand) Hannah Saxon
- (Nigeria) Faridat Abdulwahab
- (Nigeria) Khadijat Adegoke
- (Nigeria) Taiwo Afolabi
- (Nigeria) Harmony Chidi
- (Nigeria) Peace Effiong
- (North Korea) Ho Kyong
- (North Korea) Jon Il-chong
- (North Korea) Kang Ryu-mi
- (North Korea) Ro Un-hyang
- (Poland) Weronika Araśniewicz
- (Poland) Kinga Wyrwas
- (South Korea) Casey Phair
- (Spain) Amaya García
- (Spain) Ainoa Gómez
- (Spain) Emma Moreno
- (Spain) Noa Ortega
- (United States) Kimmi Ascanio
- (United States) Micayla Johnson
- (United States) Mary Long
- (United States) Ainsley McCammon

1 own goal

- (Dominican Republic) Renata Mercedes (against New Zealand)
- (England) Zara Shaw (against Spain)
- (Japan) Haruko Suzuki (against Zambia)
- (United States) Jocelyn Travers (against Spain)

== Marketing ==
=== Logo ===
The official emblem of the FIFA U-17 Women's World Cup Dominican Republic 2024™ was digitally unveiled on 11 May 2024. The design conveys a story of joy, unity, and celebration. At its core is the silhouette of the tournament trophy, symbolizing the aspirations of young female footballers, while also evoking the traditional Dominican "Muñecas sin Rostro"—the iconic faceless doll representing the country's rich cultural heritage. Notably, this marks the first time in the history of FIFA World Cup emblems, across all tournament categories, that a silhouette serves as the defining design element. Fluid shapes and dynamic lines capture the movement of traditional Dominican dances such as merengue and bachata, celebrating the nation's deep-rooted connection to music and rhythm. The emblem's vibrant color palette and artistic style are inspired by Dominican art, reflecting the vitality and creativity of its people. Additionally, the design pays homage to Taíno heritage, incorporating references to the "Batey" or "Batún", a traditional Taíno ball game. Together, these elements symbolize the unity, determination, and shared ambition of the players and teams participating in the tournament.

=== Theme song ===
On 25 September 2024, the song En la isla ("On the Island") sung by Manny Cruz was released, it will also serve as the official song of the 2026 Central American and Caribbean Games in Santo Domingo. The genre is "half-merengue-half-pop". The combination of merengue and pop represents the passion for football and the Caribbean rhythms of the host country. The song is produced by Daniel Santacruz, Elizabeth Mena and the artist himself, and is produced by Antonio González. It was heard over and over again in the stadiums of Santo Domingo and Santiago de los Caballeros, the two host cities. It also served as the background for the official music video, directed by Freddy Vargas and Óscar Nolasco, which features players from the U-17 teams that would participate in the competition, specially Taní, the event's mascot, who makes a special appearance.

=== Mascot ===
Later, the mascot was revealed in both cities. Her name is Taní and she is a Bayahibe flower (Leuenbergeria quisqueyana). The mascot's name refers to the Taíno people, indigenous to the Caribbean island, and is combined with another name, "Ana," which in their language means "flower." This unique character represents the country's exuberant natural beauty. It is also intended to evoke the emerging natural talent and spirit of the players and the friendship and rights of girls of every age. She was presented several times in the tournament stadiums.

== See also ==
- 2024 FIFA U-20 Women's World Cup
