= Jon Il-chong =

North Korean association footballer

Jon Il Chong
Personal information
- Birth name: 전일청
- Date of birth: 12 March 2007 (age 19)
- Place of birth: Pyongyang, North Korea
- Height: 1.64 m (5 ft 5 in)
- Position: Midfielder

Youth career
- 2024–: Amnokgang SC

International career^{‡}
Years	Team	Apps	(Gls)
2024	North Korea U17	10	(7)
2025–	North Korea U20	6	(3)
Medal record
Women's football
Representing North Korea
FIFA U-20 Women's World Cup
Runner-up	2026 Poland
FIFA U-17 Women's World Cup
Winner	2024 Dominican Rep.
AFC U-17 Women's Asian Cup
Winner	2024 Indonesia
- ‡ National team caps and goals as of 12 April 2026

Jon Il Chong (in Korean: 전일청; born 12 March 2007) is a North Korean footballer who plays as a midfielder or winger for Amrokgang SC in the DPR Korea Women's Premier League.

In 2024, as a member of the North Korea women's national under-17 team, she won both the top goalscorer award at the 2024 AFC U-17 Women's Asian Cup and the Golden Ball for best player at the 2024 FIFA U-17 Women's World Cup, in addition to winning both tournaments.

== International career ==
Jon gained recognition for her performances in youth competitions, particularly at the 2024 AFC U-17 Women's Asian Cup held in Indonesia, where she won the top goalscorer award by scoring six goals en route to the title.

During the tournament, her standout performance came on 5 March 2024 against South Korea—one of the most anticipated encounters due to their rivalry—where she scored a hat trick. Three days later she delivered her second-best effort, this time against the Philippines, where she contributed two goals. Notably, she also scored the only goal in the final match, leading the DPR Korea team to a 1–0 victory over Japan and securing the championship.

A few months later, during the 2024 FIFA U-17 Women's World Cup, she was a key member of the North Korean team that won the tournament in the Dominican Republic, netting the crucial equalizer in the 66th minute against Spain, which led the match to penalties and ultimately clinched the championship. For her performance throughout the entire competition she was awarded the FIFA Golden Ball for best player.

Jon made her debut for the North Korea U20 national team in 2025 against Saudi Arabia.

In March 2026, Jon was named in the squad for the 2026 AFC U-20 Women's Asian Cup.

== Personal life ==
Jon Il-chong was born in Pyongyang and started playing the sport at the age of 10. She attended the Sunan Middle School.

== Career statistics ==
=== International ===
As of match played 12 April 2026

Appearances and goals by national team and year
National team	Year	Apps	Goals
North Korea U-17	2024	10	7
North Korea U-20	2025	3	2
North Korea U-20	2026	3	1
Total		16	10

== Honours ==
North Korea U17

- AFC U-17 Women's Asian Cup: 2024.
- FIFA U-17 Women's World Cup: 2024.

North Korea U20

- FIFA U-20 Women's World Cup runner-up: 2026

Individual

- AFC U-17 Women's Asian Cup Yili Top Goalscorer: 2024
- FIFA U-17 Women's World Cup Golden Ball: 2024
