= Celia Segura =

Spanish footballer (born 2007)

Personal information
- Date of birth: 10 March 2007 (age 19)
- Place of birth: Badalona, Spain
- Height: 1.62 m (5 ft 4 in)
- Position: Forward

Team information
- Current team: Atlético Madrid (on loan from Barcelona)
- Number: 32

Youth career
- 2018–2021: FC Barcelona Infantil
- 2021–2023: FC Barcelona Cadete

Senior career*
Years	Team	Apps	(Gls)
2023–2026	Barcelona B	66	(20)
2024–	Barcelona	0	(0)
2026–	→ Atlético Madrid (loan)	0	(0)

International career
2023–2024	Spain U17	20	(11)
2025–	Spain U19		
Medal record
Women's football
Representing Spain
FIFA U-20 Women's World Cup
Winner	2026 Poland
UEFA Women's Under-19 Championship
Winner	2025 Poland
Winner	2026 Bosnia and Herzegovina
FIFA U-17 Women's World Cup
Runner-up	2024 Dominican Republic
- * Club domestic league appearances and goals as of 11:31, 17 May 2026 (UTC)

Celia Segura Rodríguez (born 10 March 2007) is a Spanish professional footballer who plays as a forward for Liga F club Atlético Madrid, on loan from Barcelona.

== Club career ==
Segura joined the Masía at age 11. In the 2018–19 season, she scored 121 goals. Segura later won the 2022–23 Primera Federación. In 2025, she debuted in the FC Barcelona Femení in the Copa Catalunya.

On 29 July 2026, Barcelona announced that they had loaned Segura out to Atlético Madrid.

== International career ==
Segura participated in the 2024 FIFA U-17 World Cup and scored the only goal in the final for Spain, who won second place following penalties against North Korea.

In 2025, Segura was part of the Spain under-19 squad that won the 2025 UEFA Under-19 Championship.

== Honours ==
Barcelona B

- Primera Federación: 2022–23

Spain U17

- FIFA U-17 Women's World Cup runner-up: 2024

Spain U19

- UEFA Women's Under-19 Championship: 2025, 2026

Spain U20

- FIFA U-20 Women's World Cup: 2026

Individual

- FIFA U-17 Women's World Cup Adidas Bronze Ball: 2024
- FIFA U-17 Women's World Cup Adidas Bronze Boot: 2024
