= Maddie Padelski =

American soccer player (born 2007)

- Padelski with the Portland Thorns in 2026

Personal information
- Full name: Madeline Abrianna Padelski
- Date of birth: September 29, 2007 (age 19)
- Height: 5 ft 5 in (1.65 m)
- Position: Forward

Team information
- Current team: Portland Thorns
- Number: 11

College career
Years	Team	Apps	(Gls)
2024–2025	Alabama Crimson Tide	36	(8)

Senior career*
Years	Team	Apps	(Gls)
2026–	Portland Thorns	7	(0)

International career^{‡}
2023	United States U-16		
2024	United States U-17	9	(3)
2026–	United States U-19	2	(0)
Medal record
Women's soccer
FIFA U-17 Women's World Cup
Bronze medal – third place	Dominican Republic 2024
- * Club domestic league appearances and goals as of 18:01, November 11, 2026 (UTC) ‡ National team caps and goals as of 00:13, September 12, 2026 (UTC)

Madeline Abrianna Padelski (born September 29, 2007) is an American professional soccer player who plays as a forward for Portland Thorns FC of the National Women's Soccer League (NWSL). She played college soccer for the Alabama Crimson Tide. She won bronze with the United States at the 2024 FIFA U-17 Women's World Cup.

== Early life ==
Padelski grew up in Johnson City, Tennessee, the daughter of Anthony and Brandi Padelski, and has two brothers. She started playing soccer when she was four and decided to focus on the sport when she was eight or nine, idolizing United States striker Alex Morgan. Her family moved to Nolensville when she was in seventh grade. She played club soccer for Tri-Cities United before joining an ECNL team more than an hour away in Knoxville. She then spent five years with Tennessee SC, where she earned ECNL All-American honors in 2023.

When she was 13, Padelski emerged as the top scorer for Nolensville High School with 31 goals and 7 assists in her freshman year in 2021. She scored 29 goals as a sophomore to help Nolensville win the regional title in 2022, scoring game winners in the last two rounds. She scored 17 goals in just 7 games in her junior year in 2023, before she graduated one year early to start college at age 16. She chose not to forego college despite receiving interest from the NWSL's Kansas City Current, Racing Louisville, and San Diego Wave.

== College career ==
Padelski played in 14 games, starting 11, and scored 2 goals for the Alabama Crimson Tide as a freshman in 2024, missing about a month while at the 2024 FIFA U-17 Women's World Cup. She scored 6 goals in 22 games, making 16 starts, as a sophomore in 2025. She scored in both rounds in the NCAA tournament as the Tide lost to eventual finalists Stanford. After two seasons in Tuscaloosa, she decided to go pro and give up her remaining college eligibility.

== Club career ==
Portland Thorns FC announced on January 8, 2026, that they had signed Padelski to her first professional contract on a two-year deal. She made her professional debut as a 61st-minute substitute for Reilyn Turner in a season-opening 1–0 win against the Washington Spirit on March 13.

== International career ==
Padelski was first called up to the United States national under-16 team in October 2022. She helped the team win an invitational tournament in France the next year. She was included on the under-17 roster for the 2024 FIFA U-17 Women's World Cup, where she helped the United States place third, its best result since 2008. She scored two goals, including the team's third goal in a 3–0 win over England in the third-place match.

== Honors ==
United States U-17

- FIFA U-17 Women's World Cup bronze medal: 2024
