= The Pine School =

Location
- 12350 S.E. Federal Highway; Hobe Sound, Florida 33455; United States; 27°03′05″N 80°08′34″W

Information
- Former name: St. Michaels School
- Type: Private
- Motto: Possunt Quia, Posse Videntur
- Established: 1969
- Founder: Harold Potsdam
- Head of school: Kelly Hilton-Green (Interim)
- Teaching staff: 44.0 (on an FTE basis)
- Grades: K-12
- Enrollment: 354 (2017-18)
- Student to teacher ratio: 8.0
- Colors: Navy blue and gold
- Nickname: Knights
- Website: www.thepineschool.org

The Pine School is a private school that serves students from kindergarten through grade 12 in Hobe Sound, Florida, United States.

== History ==
The school was formerly known as St. Michaels School.

== Notable alumni ==
- Peg Parnevik - Swedish singer and songwriter
