= Peace Effiong =

Nigerian footballer

Personal information
- Date of birth: 29 November 2009 (age 16)
- Place of birth: Nigeria
- Position: Forward

Team information
- Current team: Rivers Angels

Youth career
- Young Talent 99

Senior career*
Years	Team	Apps	(Gls)
- Rivers Angels

International career
2024–	Nigeria U17		
- * Club domestic league appearances and goals

Peace Effiong (born 29 November 2009) is a Nigerian footballer who plays as a forward. She has played for the Nigeria women's national under-17 football team and has been a player in club football in Nigeria, including Rivers Angels F.C. Effiong gained international attention during the 2024 FIFA Under17 Women's World Cup, where she scored for Nigeria during the tournament.

== Early life and background ==
Peace Effiong was born and brought up in Nigeria. She developed an early interest in football, often playing street football before joining organised teams. She played for a local amateur side known as Young Talent 99 before moving into competitive club football. Her development eventually led to selection for Nigeria's youth national team. Effiong spoke about the influence of her mother in supporting her football ambitions. According to interviews during the 2024 FIFA Under17 Women's World Cup, she described her mother as her main motivation in pursuing a professional football career.

== Club career ==
Effiong started her club career in Nigeria and later played for Rivers Angels F.C., one of the teams competing in the Nigerian women's league. Her performances at club level helped her gain recognition and eventual selection for Nigeria's youth national team. She has been listed among the attacking players representing Rivers Angels in youth competitions and development tournaments connected to Nigeria's national team scouting system.

== International career ==
Effiong has played for Nigeria at youth level with the Nigeria women's national under-17 football team football team. She was named in the squad selected for the 2024 FIFA Under17 Women's World Cup, where Nigeria competed against teams including Ecuador and New Zealand in the group stage. During the tournament, Effiong scored a goal in Nigeria's 4–0 victory against Ecuador and celebrated her first goal at the Under17 Women's World Cup.

She also played in the team during the African qualifying rounds for the competition and was part of the attacking lineup alongside other forwards in the Flamingos squad. In addition to the World Cup campaign, Effiong has been included in Nigeria's squad for regional youth competitions such as the WAFU B Under17 Girls’ Cup.

== Playing style ==
Effiong plays as a forward and is known for her goal-scoring ability and attacking movement. During youth competitions with Nigeria's Flamingos, she has been noted for her ability to score from distance and create scoring opportunities.
