= 2025 South American U-17 Women's Championship squads =

The following is a list of squads for each national team competing at the 2025 South American U-17 Women's Championship in Colombia. Each national team had to submit a squad of 22 players born on or after 1 January 2008.

== Group A ==
=== Argentina ===
Head coach: Christian Meloni

The squad was announced on 24 April 2025.

| No. | Pos. | Player | Date of birth (age) | Club |
|---|---|---|---|---|
| 1 | GK | Paulina Aprile | 13 May 2008 (aged 16) | (Argentine Football Association) Rosario Central |
| 12 | GK | Julia Zaldarriaga | 15 December 2008 (aged 16) | (United States Soccer Federation) Players Development Academy |
| 22 | GK | Araceli Saleme | 1 December 2009 (aged 15) | (Argentine Football Association) River Plate |
| 3 | DF | Sofía Hanashiro | 12 February 2008 (aged 17) | (Argentine Football Association) River Plate |
| 4 | DF | Sofía Quiroga | 15 May 2008 (aged 16) | (Argentine Football Association) River Plate |
| 6 | DF | Costanza Pacheco | 29 April 2008 (aged 17) | (Argentine Football Association) Boca Juniors |
| 13 | DF | Ana Noya | 5 January 2009 (aged 16) | (Argentine Football Association) Belgrano |
| 14 | DF | Ludmila Cardozo | 5 January 2009 (aged 16) | (Argentine Football Association) Boca Juniors |
| 2 | MF | Agustina Maldonado | 19 March 2009 (aged 16) | (Argentine Football Association) All Boys |
| 5 | MF | Zoe Gómez | 16 September 2008 (aged 16) | (Argentine Football Association) Huracán |
| 8 | MF | Renata Barletta | 17 September 2009 (aged 15) | (Argentine Football Association) Platense |
| 15 | MF | Julieta De Lucía | 9 February 2008 (aged 17) | (Argentine Football Association) Talleres |
| 16 | MF | Agustina Suárez | 1 November 2008 (aged 16) | (Argentine Football Association) Banfield |
| 7 | FW | Julieta Aguilar | 29 July 2010 (aged 14) | (Argentine Football Association) Newell's Old Boys |
| 9 | FW | Annika Paz | 16 November 2008 (aged 16) | (Argentine Football Association) River Plate |
| 10 | FW | María Delgado | 17 April 2008 (aged 17) | (Royal Spanish Football Federation) Atlético Madrid |
| 11 | FW | Violeta Álvarez | 28 April 2009 (aged 16) | (Argentine Football Association) Boca Juniors |
| 17 | FW | Oriana Gómez | 18 January 2009 (aged 16) | (Argentine Football Association) San Lorenzo |
| 18 | FW | Dafne Cardozo | 6 January 2010 (aged 15) | (Argentine Football Association) River Plate |
| 19 | FW | Lara Luna | 9 June 2008 (aged 16) | (Argentine Football Association) Banfield |
| 20 | FW | Giselle White | 29 May 2008 (aged 16) | (United States Soccer Federation) Santa Rosa |
| 21 | MF | Oriana Bralo | 12 February 2009 (aged 16) | (Argentine Football Association) Boca Juniors |

=== Chile ===
Head coach: (Ecuador) Vanessa Arauz

The squad was announced on 26 April 2025.

| No. | Pos. | Player | Date of birth (age) | Club |
|---|---|---|---|---|
| 1 | GK | Oriana Cristancho | 2 October 2009 (aged 15) | (Football Federation of Chile) Universidad de Chile |
| 12 | GK | Catalina Gajardo | 22 May 2008 (aged 16) | (Football Federation of Chile) Santiago Morning |
| 22 | GK | Ashley Castillo | 7 December 2008 (aged 16) | (Football Federation of Chile) Universidad de Concepción |
| 2 | DF | Constanza Sánchez | 2 June 2010 (aged 14) | (Football Federation of Chile) Universidad de Chile |
| 3 | DF | Florencia Gálvez | 7 April 2009 (aged 16) | (Football Federation of Chile) Everton |
| 4 | DF | Isidora Toro | 29 July 2008 (aged 16) | (Football Federation of Chile) Universidad de Chile |
| 14 | DF | Constanza González | 18 September 2010 (aged 14) | (Football Federation of Chile) Colo-Colo |
| 15 | DF | Isidora León | 18 September 2008 (aged 16) | (Football Federation of Chile) Universidad Católica |
| 16 | DF | María Valdivieso | 15 February 2010 (aged 15) | (Football Federation of Chile) Huachipato |
| 17 | DF | Antonella Puelles | 2 December 2008 (aged 16) | (Football Federation of Chile) Antofagasta |
| 21 | DF | Isidora Flores | 13 April 2008 (aged 17) | (Football Federation of Chile) Universidad Católica |
| 5 | MF | Amparo Abarca | 8 August 2009 (aged 15) | (Football Federation of Chile) Universidad Católica |
| 6 | MF | Antonella Casas-Cordero | 2 November 2008 (aged 16) | (Football Federation of Chile) Universidad de Chile |
| 7 | MF | Antonella Martínez | 14 September 2009 (aged 15) | (Football Federation of Chile) Everton |
| 8 | MF | Yocelin Muñoz | 8 May 2008 (aged 16) | (Football Federation of Chile) Rangers |
| 10 | MF | Amaral Farías | 8 January 2010 (aged 15) | (Football Federation of Chile) Colo-Colo |
| 11 | MF | Geraldine Mardones | 20 December 2008 (aged 16) | (Football Federation of Chile) Colo-Colo |
| 18 | MF | Isidora Cavieres | 18 April 2009 (aged 16) | (Football Federation of Chile) Colo-Colo |
| 9 | FW | Catalina Muñoz | 26 May 2010 (aged 14) | (Football Federation of Chile) Colo-Colo |
| 13 | FW | Antonia Crot | 19 March 2010 (aged 15) | (Football Federation of Chile) Cobresal |
| 19 | FW | Penélope Correa | 19 September 2008 (aged 16) | (United States Soccer Federation) MVLA |
| 20 | FW | Nicole Carter | 13 August 2008 (aged 16) | (Football Federation of Chile) Colo-Colo |

=== Colombia ===
Head coach: Carlos Paniagua

The squad was announced on 28 April 2025.

| No. | Pos. | Player | Date of birth (age) | Club |
|---|---|---|---|---|
| 1 | GK | María Tejada | 18 July 2008 (aged 16) | (Colombian Football Federation) Independiente Medellín |
| 12 | GK | Sofía Prieto | 26 September 2009 (aged 15) | (Colombian Football Federation) Esc Carlos Sarmiento |
| 2 | DF | María Hoyos | 27 June 2008 (aged 16) | (Colombian Football Federation) América |
| 4 | DF | Heidy Cabuya | 25 April 2009 (aged 16) | (Colombian Football Federation) Santa Fe |
| 6 | DF | Brenda Cardona | 26 October 2008 (aged 16) | (Colombian Football Federation) Santa Fe |
| 13 | DF | Isabella Amado | 19 September 2008 (aged 16) | (Colombian Football Federation) Millonarios |
| 16 | DF | Izabela Cortés | 27 January 2009 (aged 16) | (Colombian Football Federation) Santa Fe |
| 17 | DF | Sofía García | 17 January 2008 (aged 17) | (Colombian Football Federation) Real Santander |
| 3 | MF | Melanie Alzate | 18 December 2008 (aged 16) | (Colombian Football Federation) Millonarios |
| 5 | MF | Isabella Santa | 8 June 2008 (aged 16) | (Colombian Football Federation) Esc Carlos Sarmiento |
| 8 | MF | Andrea García | 11 April 2008 (aged 17) | (Colombian Football Federation) Once Caldas |
| 10 | MF | Ella Martínez | 5 April 2008 (aged 17) | (United States Soccer Federation) Carolina Ascent |
| 11 | MF | Vanessa Puerta | 21 May 2009 (aged 15) | (United States Soccer Federation) SUSA Academy |
| 14 | MF | Maria Agudelo | 26 April 2008 (aged 17) | (Colombian Football Federation) Millonarios |
| 18 | MF | Maura Henao | 14 July 2010 (aged 14) | (Colombian Football Federation) Esc Carlos Sarmiento |
| 20 | MF | Shaira Collazos | 16 May 2008 (aged 16) | (Colombian Football Federation) Millonarios |
| 21 | MF | Ivanna Parra | 28 June 2008 (aged 16) | (Colombian Football Federation) América |
| 7 | FW | Maria Baldovino | 15 December 2008 (aged 16) | (Colombian Football Federation) Junior |
| 9 | FW | Camila Cortés | 17 June 2008 (aged 16) | (Colombian Football Federation) Santa Fe |
| 15 | FW | Eidy Ruiz | 1 April 2009 (aged 16) | (Colombian Football Federation) Esc Carlos Sarmiento |
| 19 | FW | Sara Malaver | 9 June 2008 (aged 16) | (Colombian Football Federation) Millonarios |
| 22 | FW | Melany Díaz | 17 March 2008 (aged 17) | (Colombian Football Federation) Santa Fe |

=== Paraguay ===
Head coach: (Brazil) Luiz Guimarães

The squad was announced on 25 April 2025.

| No. | Pos. | Player | Date of birth (age) | Club |
|---|---|---|---|---|
| 1 | GK | Estefani Ruiz | 16 May 2009 (aged 15) | (Paraguayan Football Association) Olimpia |
| 12 | GK | Paloma Vergara | 10 January 2008 (aged 17) | (Paraguayan Football Association) General Caballero |
| 22 | GK | Tamara Amarilla | 22 January 2009 (aged 16) | (Paraguayan Football Association) Cerro Porteño |
| 2 | DF | Bárbara Olmedo | 26 January 2008 (aged 17) | (Paraguayan Football Association) Cerro Porteño |
| 3 | DF | Luz Benítez | 25 July 2009 (aged 15) | (Paraguayan Football Association) Olimpia |
| 4 | DF | Ximena Moreno | 28 April 2008 (aged 17) | (Paraguayan Football Association) Olimpia |
| 6 | DF | Jazmín Pintos | 3 April 2008 (aged 17) | (Paraguayan Football Association) Cerro Porteño |
| 13 | DF | Analía Arias | 26 December 2010 (aged 14) | (Paraguayan Football Association) Cerro Porteño |
| 14 | DF | Luz Paiva | 18 December 2008 (aged 16) | (Paraguayan Football Association) Cerro Porteño |
| 15 | DF | Denisse Leiva | 6 July 2008 (aged 16) | (Paraguayan Football Association) Cerro Porteño |
| 16 | DF | Erika Figueredo | 14 May 2008 (aged 16) | (Paraguayan Football Association) Cerro Porteño |
| 5 | MF | Kiara Florentin | 27 November 2008 (aged 16) | (Paraguayan Football Association) Nacional/Humaitá |
| 7 | MF | Fiorella Aquino | 31 March 2008 (aged 17) | (Paraguayan Football Association) Libertad |
| 8 | MF | Maite Mussi | 13 July 2008 (aged 16) | (Paraguayan Football Association) Olimpia |
| 17 | MF | Florencia Cáceres | 30 October 2009 (aged 15) | (United States Soccer Federation) Florida Kraze Krush |
| 18 | MF | Jazmín Rolón | 4 July 2010 (aged 14) | (Paraguayan Football Association) Recoleta |
| 9 | FW | Alison Bareiro | 3 January 2008 (aged 17) | (Paraguayan Football Association) Olimpia |
| 10 | FW | Sofía Cabrera | 7 August 2010 (aged 14) | (Paraguayan Football Association) Cerro Porteño |
| 11 | FW | Claudia Martínez | 15 January 2008 (aged 17) | (Paraguayan Football Association) Olimpia |
| 19 | FW | María Vera | 2 May 2008 (aged 16) | (Argentine Football Association) Independiente |
| 20 | FW | Katia Caballero | 31 March 2009 (aged 16) | (Paraguayan Football Association) Olimpia |
| 21 | FW | Cynthia Casco | 22 January 2009 (aged 16) | (Paraguayan Football Association) Olimpia |

=== Venezuela ===
Head coach: Dayana Frías

The squad was announced on 27 April 2025.

| No. | Pos. | Player | Date of birth (age) | Club |
|---|---|---|---|---|
| 1 | GK | Valeria Rebanales | 25 August 2009 (aged 15) | (Venezuelan Football Federation) Adiffem |
| 12 | GK | Ivana Veloz | 11 September 2009 (aged 15) | (Venezuelan Football Federation) Academia Yurubí |
| 3 | DF | Gilary Díaz | 24 October 2008 (aged 16) | (Venezuelan Football Federation) Caracas |
| 4 | DF | Dayerlis Adrián | 16 September 2008 (aged 16) | (Venezuelan Football Federation) Caracas |
| 6 | DF | Ariana Cova | 6 August 2008 (aged 16) | (Venezuelan Football Federation) Caracas |
| 13 | DF | Estefany Neiro | 13 September 2008 (aged 16) | (Venezuelan Football Federation) Adiffem |
| 16 | DF | Amanda Gugliotta | 26 September 2008 (aged 16) | (Venezuelan Football Federation) América |
| 17 | DF | Ivanka Abenza | 7 January 2009 (aged 16) | (German Football Association) Eintracht Frankfurt |
| 21 | DF | Nazareth Zambrano | 9 April 2008 (aged 17) | (Venezuelan Football Federation) Adiffem |
| 2 | MF | Paola Giménez | 9 March 2009 (aged 16) | (Venezuelan Football Federation) Deportivo RK |
| 5 | MF | Valeria Rojas | 5 November 2009 (aged 15) | (Venezuelan Football Federation) ULA |
| 7 | MF | Melanie Chirinos | 20 March 2008 (aged 17) | (Venezuelan Football Federation) Adiffem |
| 8 | MF | Anggely Muñoz | 11 June 2008 (aged 16) | (Venezuelan Football Federation) Táchira |
| 11 | MF | Ailing Herrera | 15 July 2008 (aged 16) | (Venezuelan Football Federation) Caracas |
| 15 | MF | Claudia Pérez | 10 July 2008 (aged 16) | (Venezuelan Football Federation) Miranda |
| 18 | MF | Erika Bovell | 19 March 2009 (aged 16) | (United States Soccer Federation) Kansas Rush |
| 19 | MF | Juneski Flores | 23 February 2009 (aged 16) | (Venezuelan Football Federation) Caracas |
| 20 | MF | Juliana Vásquez | 16 January 2008 (aged 17) | (Venezuelan Football Federation) Seca Sport |
| 9 | FW | Avril Mejía | 1 February 2008 (aged 17) | (Brazilian Football Confederation) Ferroviária |
| 10 | FW | Orliany Durán | 8 August 2009 (aged 15) | (Venezuelan Football Federation) ULA |
| 14 | FW | Diana Bravo | 7 December 2009 (aged 15) | (Venezuelan Football Federation) Adiffem |
| 22 | FW | Marielbis Gutiérrez | 20 December 2008 (aged 16) | (Venezuelan Football Federation) Seca Sport |

== Group B ==
=== Bolivia ===
Head coach: (Argentina) Rosana Gómez

The squad was announced on 28 April 2025.

| No. | Pos. | Player | Date of birth (age) | Club |
|---|---|---|---|---|
| 1 | GK | Neyda Severich | 17 October 2008 (aged 16) | (Bolivian Football Federation) Kanata |
| 12 | GK | Miel Bruno | 25 October 2008 (aged 16) | (Bolivian Football Federation) Calleja |
| 22 | GK | Isabella Tórrez | 22 August 2008 (aged 16) | (Bolivian Football Federation) Calleja |
| 2 | DF | Alejandra Orellano | 24 August 2009 (aged 15) | (Bolivian Football Federation) Universitario |
| 3 | DF | Mikaela Hurtado | 8 July 2009 (aged 15) | (Bolivian Football Federation) Blooming |
| 4 | DF | Monserath Cabrera | 21 July 2008 (aged 16) | (Bolivian Football Federation) Valles Cruceños |
| 5 | DF | Mikaela Paity | 6 October 2008 (aged 16) | (Bolivian Football Federation) Universitario |
| 13 | DF | Jaise Nina | 5 December 2009 (aged 15) | (Bolivian Football Federation) Exótico |
| 14 | DF | Luciana Terán | 29 July 2008 (aged 16) | (Bolivian Football Federation) Blooming |
| 6 | MF | Dione Hurtado | 26 January 2009 (aged 16) | (Bolivian Football Federation) Deportivo Ita |
| 8 | MF | Marcia Huallpa | 18 March 2009 (aged 16) | (Bolivian Football Federation) Gobierno |
| 10 | MF | Marina Morato | 4 August 2008 (aged 16) | (Italian Football Federation) Lazio |
| 15 | MF | Angelina Rivero | 25 September 2008 (aged 16) | (Bolivian Football Federation) Calleja |
| 16 | MF | Leidy Luna | 3 April 2008 (aged 17) | (Bolivian Football Federation) Bolívar |
| 17 | MF | Nicol Maita | 16 June 2008 (aged 16) | (Bolivian Football Federation) Universitario |
| 19 | MF | Mariel Aguilar | 12 October 2008 (aged 16) | (Bolivian Football Federation) Universitario |
| 7 | FW | Thalia Rueda | 2 July 2009 (aged 15) | (Bolivian Football Federation) Inter Stars Rush |
| 9 | FW | Soraya Achá | 17 June 2010 (aged 14) | (Bolivian Football Federation) Kanata |
| 11 | FW | Thiara Renjifo | 23 May 2009 (aged 15) | (Bolivian Football Federation) Inter Stars Rush |
| 18 | FW | María Égüez | 16 May 2008 (aged 16) | (Bolivian Football Federation) Blooming |
| 20 | FW | Leisy Dara | 31 January 2008 (aged 17) | (Bolivian Football Federation) Esperanza |
| 21 | FW | Melisa Vaca | 8 February 2008 (aged 17) | (Bolivian Football Federation) Calleja |

=== Brazil ===
Head coach: Rilany

The squad was announced on 26 April 2025.

| No. | Pos. | Player | Date of birth (age) | Club |
|---|---|---|---|---|
| 1 | GK | Morganti | 30 November 2008 (aged 16) | (Brazilian Football Confederation) Corinthians |
| 12 | GK | Josi | 19 May 2008 (aged 16) | (Brazilian Football Confederation) Grêmio |
| 2 | DF | Allyne | 14 June 2008 (aged 16) | (Brazilian Football Confederation) Grêmio |
| 3 | DF | Marina | 18 August 2008 (aged 16) | (Brazilian Football Confederation) São Paulo |
| 4 | DF | Dany | 27 June 2008 (aged 16) | (Brazilian Football Confederation) Corinthians |
| 5 | DF | Andreyna | 2 March 2009 (aged 16) | (Brazilian Football Confederation) Ferroviária |
| 14 | DF | Isadora Rech | 31 August 2009 (aged 15) | (Brazilian Football Confederation) Internacional |
| 15 | DF | Mari | 26 May 2009 (aged 15) | (Brazilian Football Confederation) São Paulo |
| 16 | DF | Bela | 17 February 2008 (aged 17) | (United States Soccer Federation) Beach |
| 6 | MF | Júlia Pereira | 19 April 2008 (aged 17) | (Brazilian Football Confederation) São Paulo |
| 7 | MF | Pepê | 14 April 2009 (aged 16) | (Brazilian Football Confederation) Corinthians |
| 8 | MF | Carol Melo | 28 December 2009 (aged 15) | (Brazilian Football Confederation) Corinthians |
| 13 | MF | Gabi Rolnik | 10 August 2010 (aged 14) | (Portuguese Football Federation) Benfica |
| 17 | MF | Martha Rajo | 12 October 2009 (aged 15) | (Brazilian Football Confederation) Internacional |
| 18 | MF | Dulce Maria | 27 February 2008 (aged 17) | (Brazilian Football Confederation) Corinthians |
| 20 | MF | Julinha | 26 April 2008 (aged 17) | (Brazilian Football Confederation) Corinthians |
| 9 | FW | Yngrid Piauí | 22 December 2008 (aged 16) | (Brazilian Football Confederation) Internacional |
| 10 | FW | Giovana Iseppe | 10 October 2008 (aged 16) | (Brazilian Football Confederation) São Paulo |
| 11 | FW | Maria | 28 November 2008 (aged 16) | (Brazilian Football Confederation) Grêmio |
| 19 | FW | Gabi Push | 20 February 2008 (aged 17) | (Brazilian Football Confederation) Ferroviária |
| 21 | FW | Evelin | 8 April 2008 (aged 17) | (Brazilian Football Confederation) Santos |
| 22 | FW | Ravenna | 25 July 2008 (aged 16) | (Brazilian Football Confederation) Fortaleza |

=== Ecuador ===
Head coach: Víctor Idrovo

The squad was announced on 16 April 2025.

| No. | Pos. | Player | Date of birth (age) | Club |
|---|---|---|---|---|
| 1 | GK | Nayeli Rodríguez | 28 October 2008 (aged 16) | (Ecuadorian Football Federation) Universidad Católica |
| 12 | GK | Analia Machuca | 1 May 2010 (aged 14) | (Ecuadorian Football Federation) Independiente del Valle |
| 22 | GK | Romina Leigue | 19 May 2010 (aged 14) | (Ecuadorian Football Federation) Quito |
| 3 | DF | Maite Zambrano | 13 October 2008 (aged 16) | (Ecuadorian Football Federation) Independiente del Valle |
| 5 | DF | Zoe Garcés | 12 February 2008 (aged 17) | (Ecuadorian Football Federation) CFC Olé |
| 15 | DF | Esther Carabalí | 22 May 2009 (aged 15) | (Ecuadorian Football Federation) Independiente del Valle |
| 8 | MF | Valeria Briones | 8 November 2009 (aged 15) | (Ecuadorian Football Federation) Barcelona |
| 10 | MF | Mary Guerra | 7 March 2008 (aged 17) | (Ecuadorian Football Federation) Independiente del Valle |
| 11 | MF | Emily Fierro | 24 October 2008 (aged 16) | (Ecuadorian Football Federation) Independiente del Valle |
| 13 | MF | Rosa Estupiñan | 2 April 2008 (aged 17) | (Ecuadorian Football Federation) Independiente del Valle |
| 14 | MF | Emily Tamayo | 27 February 2008 (aged 17) | (Ecuadorian Football Federation) LDU Quito |
| 16 | MF | Niurka Bajaña | 2 January 2010 (aged 15) | (Ecuadorian Football Federation) Independiente del Valle |
| 18 | MF | Xiomara Alcívar | 14 September 2008 (aged 16) | (Ecuadorian Football Federation) LDU Quito |
| 19 | MF | Érika López | 19 December 2008 (aged 16) | (Ecuadorian Football Federation) Ñañas |
| 20 | MF | Abigail Villacís | 19 May 2008 (aged 16) | (Ecuadorian Football Federation) Independiente del Valle |
| 21 | MF | María Loja | 14 May 2008 (aged 16) | (Ecuadorian Football Federation) Independiente del Valle |
| 2 | FW | Dayanna Andocilla | 7 March 2009 (aged 16) | (Ecuadorian Football Federation) Búhos |
| 4 | FW | Ammy Flores | 10 March 2008 (aged 17) | (Ecuadorian Football Federation) Independiente del Valle |
| 6 | FW | Scarlet Garaicoa | 25 July 2008 (aged 16) | (Ecuadorian Football Federation) Barcelona |
| 7 | FW | Emily Vargas | 7 June 2008 (aged 16) | (Ecuadorian Football Federation) Barcelona |
| 9 | FW | Jaslym Valverde | 10 December 2009 (aged 15) | (Ecuadorian Football Federation) Independiente del Valle |
| 17 | FW | Emily Delgado | 20 September 2008 (aged 16) | (Ecuadorian Football Federation) Universidad Católica |

=== Peru ===
Head coach: Fiorella Valverde

The squad was announced on 29 April 2025.

| No. | Pos. | Player | Date of birth (age) | Club |
|---|---|---|---|---|
| 1 | GK | Kaylee Rybinski | 4 April 2009 (aged 16) | (Peruvian Football Federation) Alianza Lima |
| 12 | GK | Fiorela Sucuitana | 7 August 2009 (aged 15) | (Peruvian Football Federation) Sporting Cristal |
| 2 | DF | Ariana Sabalu | 31 May 2008 (aged 16) | (Peruvian Football Federation) Alianza Lima |
| 3 | DF | Mariana Bacalla | 15 August 2008 (aged 16) | (Peruvian Football Federation) Colmillos |
| 4 | DF | Aldana Costa | 28 April 2010 (aged 15) | (Peruvian Football Federation) Alianza Lima |
| 6 | DF | Mia García | 23 May 2009 (aged 15) | (Peruvian Football Federation) Alianza Lima |
| 13 | DF | Ana Deletre | 2 July 2009 (aged 15) | (French Football Federation) Stade de Reims |
| 15 | DF | Fátima Huaylupo | 1 April 2008 (aged 17) | (Peruvian Football Federation) Alianza Lima |
| 5 | MF | Lia Chambi | 30 June 2009 (aged 15) | (Peruvian Football Federation) Melgar |
| 8 | MF | Mia Meist | 25 April 2008 (aged 17) | (Peruvian Football Federation) Sporting Cristal |
| 10 | MF | Alba Soto | 9 December 2008 (aged 16) | (Peruvian Football Federation) Melgar |
| 11 | MF | Dominic Escudero | 2 October 2008 (aged 16) | (Peruvian Football Federation) Yanapuma |
| 16 | MF | Lucia Campoblanco | 23 September 2008 (aged 16) | (Peruvian Football Federation) Alianza Lima |
| 20 | MF | Khole Olano | 12 April 2008 (aged 17) | (United States Soccer Federation) World Class |
| 22 | MF | Alejandra Salazar | 30 September 2009 (aged 15) | (Peruvian Football Federation) Killas |
| 7 | FW | Aldana Rodriguez | 30 April 2009 (aged 16) | (Peruvian Football Federation) Alianza Lima |
| 9 | FW | Dasha Hernández | 5 February 2009 (aged 16) | (Peruvian Football Federation) Sporting Cristal |
| 14 | FW | Valeria Huamani | 21 May 2008 (aged 16) | (Peruvian Football Federation) Alianza Lima |
| 17 | FW | Rafaella Collantes | 21 May 2009 (aged 15) | (United States Soccer Federation) Virginia Revolution |
| 18 | FW | Brisa Alvarado | 29 September 2009 (aged 15) | (Peruvian Football Federation) Sporting Cristal |
| 19 | FW | Alexa Zevallos | 1 July 2008 (aged 16) | (Peruvian Football Federation) Melgar |
| 23 | FW | Emilia Consiglieri | 13 November 2008 (aged 16) | (Peruvian Football Federation) Alianza Lima |

=== Uruguay ===
Head coach: Diego Franco Peraza

The squad was announced on 24 April 2025.

| No. | Pos. | Player | Date of birth (age) | Club |
|---|---|---|---|---|
| 1 | GK | Manuela Techera | 18 March 2008 (aged 17) | (Uruguayan Football Association) Nacional |
| 12 | GK | Luzmila Duarte | 15 January 2009 (aged 16) | (Uruguayan Football Association) Nacional |
| 22 | GK | Sofía García | 7 October 2008 (aged 16) | (Uruguayan Football Association) Litoral de Paysandú |
| 2 | DF | Maisha Vázquez | 19 April 2009 (aged 16) | (Uruguayan Football Association) Nacional |
| 3 | DF | Melina Vidal | 18 August 2008 (aged 16) | (Uruguayan Football Association) Peñarol |
| 4 | DF | Victoria Vargas | 19 March 2009 (aged 16) | (Uruguayan Football Association) Nacional de Florida |
| 6 | DF | Sofía Rodríguez | 17 July 2008 (aged 16) | (Uruguayan Football Association) Liverpool |
| 13 | DF | María Figueroa | 13 July 2008 (aged 16) | (Uruguayan Football Association) Nacional |
| 15 | DF | Martina Fuentes | 11 September 2009 (aged 15) | (Uruguayan Football Association) Liverpool |
| 18 | DF | Belén Olivera | 20 March 2008 (aged 17) | (Uruguayan Football Association) Peñarol |
| 5 | MF | Rocío Frachia | 14 October 2009 (aged 15) | (Uruguayan Football Association) Liverpool |
| 7 | MF | Paulina Morena | 29 November 2009 (aged 15) | (Uruguayan Football Association) Nacional |
| 8 | MF | Martina Cappo | 8 October 2009 (aged 15) | (Uruguayan Football Association) Liverpool |
| 14 | MF | Alma Toledo | 22 June 2009 (aged 15) | (Uruguayan Football Association) Liverpool |
| 16 | MF | Milagros Fernández | 10 January 2010 (aged 15) | (Uruguayan Football Association) Peñarol |
| 19 | MF | Pilar Montandón | 3 September 2009 (aged 15) | (Uruguayan Football Association) Laureles |
| 21 | MF | Antonella Cordero | 2 June 2009 (aged 15) | (Uruguayan Football Association) Defensor Sporting |
| 9 | FW | Agostina Márcora | 24 November 2008 (aged 16) | (Uruguayan Football Association) Nacional |
| 10 | FW | Morena Sellanes | 24 January 2008 (aged 17) | (Uruguayan Football Association) Juventud de Colonia |
| 11 | FW | Camila Rijo | 5 June 2010 (aged 14) | (Uruguayan Football Association) Liverpool |
| 17 | FW | Martina Ventura | 10 March 2008 (aged 17) | (Uruguayan Football Association) Nacional |
| 20 | FW | Micaela Da Silveira | 22 November 2009 (aged 15) | (Uruguayan Football Association) Peñarol |
