= Chile women's national under-20 football team =

Women's youth national football team representing Chile

Chile Women's U-20
- Nickname: La Roja Femenina (The Feminine Red)
- Association: Federación de Fútbol de Chile (FFCh)
- Confederation: CONMEBOL (South America)
- Head coach: (Chile) Luis Mena
- Captain: Vaitiare Pardo
- Home stadium: Estadio Nacional Julio Martínez Prádanos
- FIFA code: CHI
First colours	Second colours

First international
- Chile 1–9 Bolivia (Sucre, Bolivia; 11 May 2004)

Biggest win
- Chile 7–0 Peru (Santiago, Chile; 12 November 2025)

Biggest defeat
- Chile 1–9 Bolivia (Sucre, Bolivia; 11 May 2004)

South American Under-20 Women's Football Championship
- Appearances: 11 (first in 2004)
- Best result: Fourth Place (2010)

FIFA U-20 Women's World Cup
- Appearances: 1 (first in 2008)
- Best result: Group Stage (2008)

The Chile women's national under-20 football team represents Chile in the international women's football at under-20 age levels competitions. It is administered by the Federación de Fútbol de Chile (FFC) and is a member of CONMEBOL. The team plays South American Under-20 Women's Football Championship.

== History ==
The Chile women's national under-20 football team represents Chile at women's soccer age of U-20. They have faced Bolivia on 11 May 2004 at Sucre, Bolivia and which lost by 1–9 goals its their biggest defeat as so far. In their South American Under-20 Women's Football Championship competition history the girls finished Fourth-Place in 2010. The team have qualified to the FIFA U-20 Women's World Cup once in 2008 as the host country.

== Competitive records ==
=== FIFA U-20 Women's World Cup ===
FIFA U-20 Women's World Cup record
Year	Round	Position	MP	W	D*	L	GF	GA
(Canada) 2002 to (Russia) 2006	Did not qualify							
(Chile) 2008	Group Stage	13th	3	0	0	3	3	8
(Germany) 2010 to (Poland) 2026	Did not qualify							
2028	To be determined							
Total	–	1/13	3	0	0	3	3	8

=== South American Under-20 Women's Football Championship ===
South American Under-20 Women's Football Championship record
Year	Result	MP	W	D	L	GF	GA
(Brazil) 2004	Group stage	2	0	0	2	1	14
(Chile) 2006	Group stage	4	1	1	2	9	15
(Brazil) 2008	Second Round	7	2	1	4	14	14
(Colombia) 2010	Fourth Place	5	3	0	2	7	11
(Brazil) 2012	Group stage	4	2	0	2	9	5
(Uruguay) 2014	Group stage	4	2	0	2	2	6
(Brazil) 2015	Group stage	4	2	0	2	6	5
(Ecuador) 2018	Group stage	4	2	0	2	9	4
(Argentina) 2020	Group stage	4	0	0	1	2	6
(Chile) 2022	Group stage	4	1	1	2	3	3
(Ecuador) 2024	Group stage	4	1	0	3	2	8
(Paraguay) 2026	Group stage	4	0	2	2	0	5
Total	12/12	51	16	6	29	63	91

=== South American Games ===
South American Games record
Year	Result	Pld	W	D*	L	GF	GA
(Colombia) 2010	Cancelled						
(Chile) 2014	Senior Tournament						
(Bolivia) 2018	Group Stage	5	1	2	2	7	9
(Paraguay) 2022	Group Stage	2	0	0	2	1	6
(Argentina) 2026	Silver medal	4	3	1	0	10	4
Total	3/3	11	4	3	4	18	19

== Head-to-head record ==
The following table shows Chile's head-to-head record in the FIFA U-20 Women's World Cup.

Opponent	Pld	W	D	L	GF	GA	GD	Win %
England	1	0	0	1	0	2	−2	0.00
New Zealand	1	0	0	1	3	4	−1	0.00
Nigeria	1	0	0	1	0	2	−2	0.00
Total	3	0	0	3	3	8	−5	0.00

== Fixtures and results ==
Legend

Win Draw Loss Fixture

=== 2025 ===
12 November Friendly	Chile	7–0	Peru	Santiago, Chile
10:30 UTC−3	Miranda 9', 45+1'; Cabezas López 32'; Figueroa 41'; Pardo 65'; Carter 69'; Coronado 86'	Report	Rybinski (red card) 24'	Stadium: CAR José Sulantay Silva; Attendance: 0

14 November Friendly	Chile	2–0	Peru	Santiago, Chile
10:30 UTC−3	Vargas 12'; Pardo 43'	Report		Stadium: CAR José Sulantay Silva; Attendance: 0

18 December Friendly	Paraguay	3–0	Chile	Ypané, Paraguay
19:00 UTC−3	Florentín 32' (yellow card) (yellow-red card) 58'; Martínez 36', 48'; Mussi (yellow card) (yellow-red card) 70'	Report	Álvarez 54'	Stadium: CARFEM

21 December Friendly	Paraguay	4–1	Chile	Ypané, Paraguay
19:00 UTC−3	Figueredo 19'; Martínez 23', 82'; Lezcano 90+3'	Report	Álvarez 54'	Stadium: CARFEM

=== 2026 ===
4 February South American Championship	Paraguay	4–0	Chile	Villa Elisa, Paraguay
18:00 UTC−3	Mussi 15'; Martínez (yellow card) 35' (goal) 45', 63'; Villalba (yellow card) 30' (goal) 71'	Report	Abarca (yellow card) 13'; C. González (yellow card) 17'; García (yellow card) 40'	Stadium: Estadio Luis Alfonso Giagni; Referee: Rejane Caetano (Brazil)

6 February South American Championship	Chile	0–0	Colombia	Asunción, Paraguay
18:00 UTC−3	Arias (yellow card) 43'; Abarca (yellow card) 90+3'	Report	Silva (yellow card) 31'; Viáfara (yellow card) 36'; López (yellow card) 42'; Bohórquez (yellow card) 54'; Cossio (yellow card) 90+1'	Stadium: Estadio Emiliano Ghezzi; Attendance: 47; Referee: Wilma Balderrama (Bolivia)

8 February South American Championship	Chile	0–1	Uruguay	Asunción, Paraguay
18:00 UTC−3	Carter (yellow card) 79'	Report	Frachia (yellow card) 51'; Cordero 61'	Stadium: Estadio Emiliano Ghezzi; Attendance: 21; Referee: María Belén Lupera (Ecuador)

12 February South American Championship	Chile	0–0	Venezuela	Asunción, Paraguay
18:00 UTC−3	García (yellow card) 70'; Pardo (yellow card) 90+7'	Report	Graterol (yellow card) 90+7'	Stadium: Estadio Emiliano Ghezzi; Attendance: 34; Referee: Rejane Caetano (Brazil)

8 September Friendly	Chile	3–0	Uruguay	Santiago, Chile
12:00 UTC−3	Mardones (yellow card) 17'; Avello (yellow card) 50'; Pardo 58'; Álvarez 62'; Ríos 73'	Report	Elhordoy (yellow card) 33'; Cordero (yellow card) 45'; Álvez (yellow card) 75'	Stadium: CAR José Sulantay Silva; Attendance: 0 Referee: Dayared Ramírez (Chile)

10 September Friendly	Chile	2–1	Uruguay	Santiago, Chile
10:00 UTC−3	Millones (yellow card) 61' (goal) 62'; Mardones (yellow card) 76'; Martínez 90+6'	Report	Olivera (yellow card) 61'; Cordero (yellow card) 80'; Tola 89'	Stadium: CAR José Sulantay Silva; Attendance: 0 Referee: Valentina Velásquez (Chile)

16 September South American Games	Uruguay	1–3	Chile	Rosario, Argentina
15:00 UTC−3	Fuentes (yellow card) 20'; Gómez (yellow card) 26'; Tola (yellow card) 45+2' (goal) 79'; Cordero (yellow card) 52'	Report	Muñoz (yellow card) 28' (goal) 30'; García (yellow card) 45+2'; A. Álvarez 82', 90+2'	Stadium: Estadio Marcelo Bielsa; Attendance: 920; Referee: Luciana Sánchez (Argentina)

18 September South American Games	Venezuela	0–3	Chile	Rosario, Argentina
10:00 UTC−3	Alfonzo (yellow card) 30'; Bravo (yellow card) 34'; Flores (yellow card) 59'; Molina (yellow card) 86'	Report	Abarca 22'; Pardo 32'; Muñoz 45+3'; Gálvez (yellow card) 69'	Stadium: Estadio Marcelo Bielsa; Attendance: 1,450; Referee: Yhanet Portugal (Bolivia)

21 September South American Games	Paraguay	2–3	Chile	Rosario, Argentina
10:00 UTC−3	Villalba 47' (yellow card) 65'; Amarilla (yellow card) 54'; Medina (yellow card) 61'; Paiva (yellow card) 62' (goal) 69'	Report	Cabezas López (yellow card) 32'; Mardones 41' (yellow card) 32'; A. Álvarez 56' (pen.); Pardo 82'; García (yellow card) 85'	Stadium: Estadio Marcelo Bielsa; Attendance: 300; Referee: Gleika Oliveira (Brazil)

23 September South American Games; Gold medal	Chile	1–1 (2–4 p)	Venezuela	Rosario, Argentina
15:00 UTC−3	A. Martínez (yellow card) 41' (goal) 49'; Flores Vitta (yellow card) 45+1'	Report	Durán (yellow card) 45+1'; Bolsegui (yellow card) 68'; Bravo (yellow card) 78'; Flores (yellow card) 84'; Alfonzo 90+1' (pen.)	Stadium: Estadio Marcelo Bielsa; Attendance: 400; Referee: Luciana Sánchez (Argentina)
	Penalties
	A. Álvarez (penalty scored); A. Martínez (penalty missed); Mardones (penalty scored); Pardo (penalty missed)		(penalty scored) Alfonzo; (penalty scored) Alejo; (penalty scored) Rebanales; (penalty scored) Suárez

== Players ==
=== Current squad ===
The following squad was named for the 2026 South American Games.

As of 10 September 2026

No.	Pos.	Player	Date of birth (age)	Club
1	GK	Oriana Cristancho	2 October 2009 (aged 16)	(Football Federation of Chile) Universidad de Chile
12	GK	Fernanda Álvarez	20 April 2006 (aged 20)	(Football Federation of Chile) Unión Española
2	DF	Gabriela García	25 February 2006 (aged 20)	(Football Federation of Chile) Universidad de Chile
3	DF	Isidora Flores Vitta	13 April 2008 (aged 18)	(Football Federation of Chile) Universidad Católica
4	DF	Antonella Puelles	2 December 2008 (aged 17)	(Football Federation of Chile) Deportes Antofagasta
18	DF	Florencia Gálvez	7 April 2009 (aged 17)	(Football Federation of Chile) Santiago Wanderers
5	MF	Amparo Abarca	8 August 2009 (aged 17)	(Football Federation of Chile) Universidad Católica
6	MF	Antonella Martínez	14 September 2009 (aged 17)	(Football Federation of Chile) Everton
8	MF	Maite Avello	21 November 2008 (aged 17)	(Football Federation of Chile) Universidad de Chile
10	MF	Anaís Álvarez	4 July 2007 (aged 19)	(Football Federation of Chile) Colo-Colo
15	MF	Valentina Peña	10 August 2006 (aged 20)	(Football Federation of Chile) Universidad Católica
7	FW	Vaitiare Pardo (captain)	20 August 2007 (aged 19)	(Football Federation of Chile) Universidad Católica
9	FW	Pamela Cabezas López	10 July 2007 (aged 19)	(Football Federation of Chile) Universidad Católica
11	FW	Geraldine Mardones	20 December 2008 (aged 17)	(Football Federation of Chile) Colo-Colo
13	FW	Maite Martínez	20 January 2007 (aged 19)	(Football Federation of Chile) Colo-Colo
14	FW	Catalina Muñoz	26 May 2010 (aged 16)	(Football Federation of Chile) Colo-Colo
16	FW	Vaythyare Ríos	25 July 2008 (aged 18)	(Football Federation of Chile) Palestino
17	FW	Natsumy Millones	1 January 2007 (aged 19)	(Football Federation of Chile) Coquimbo Unido

== Former squads ==
=== 2008 FIFA World Cup ===
Coach: Marta Tejedor (Spain)

#	Name	Pos	DOB	Club
1	Romina Parraguirre	GK	22.09.1990	Colo-Colo (Chile)
2	Valentina Lefort	DF	26.01.1988	Universidad de Chile
3	Javiera Guajardo	DF	26.09.1989	Universidad de Chile
4	Cyntia Aguilar	DF	22.11.1989	Colo-Colo (Chile)
5	Tatiana Pérez	DF	23.10.1988	Santiago Morning (Chile)
6	Pamela Coihuín	MF	20.05.1990	Colo-Colo (Chile)
7	Christiane Endler	GK	23.07.1991	Unión La Calera (Chile)
8	Karen Araya	MF	16.10.1990	Unión La Calera (Chile)
9	Nathalie Quezada	FW	21.06.1989	Unión La Calera (Chile)
10	Maryorie Hernández	MF	20.03.1990	Universidad de Chile
11	Daniela Zamora	FW	13.11.1990	Unión La Calera (Chile)
12	Karla Ureta	GK	12.06.1989	Santiago Morning (Chile)
13	Dominique Hisis	DF	17.04.1968	Colo-Colo (Chile)
14	Daniela Pardo (captain)	MF	09.05.1988	Unión La Calera (Chile)
15	Juanita Peña	DF	25.08.1989	Santiago Morning (Chile)
16	Francisca Mardones	MF	24.03.1989	Unión La Calera (Chile)
17	Geraldine Leyton	DF	11.05.1989	Santiago Morning (Chile)
18	Daniela Fuenzalida	MF	16.12.1990	Santiago Morning (Chile)
19	Andrea Zúñiga	FW	24.01.1989	Santiago Morning (Chile)
20	Carol Negrón	MF	25.09.1989	Universidad de Chile
21	Valeska Baigorri	MF	25.08.1989	Santiago Morning (Chile)
