= Valentina Peña =

Chilean footballer

Personal information
- Full name: Valentina Alejandra Peña Marchant
- Date of birth: 10 August 2006 (age 20)
- Place of birth: Valdivia, Chile
- Height: 1.62 m (5 ft 4 in)
- Position: Midfielder

Team information
- Current team: Universidad Católica
- Number: 15

Youth career
- Windsor School
- Universidad Austral
- Deportes Valdivia
- 2022–2024: Universidad Católica

Senior career*
Years	Team	Apps	(Gls)
2023–	Universidad Católica	61	(5)

International career^{‡}
2022	Chile U17	7	(0)
2026	Chile U20	6	(0)
2026–	Chile	1	(0)
Medal record
Women's football
Representing Chile
South American Games
Silver medal – second place	2026 Santa Fe	Team
- * Club domestic league appearances and goals as of 14 October 2026 ‡ National team caps and goals as of 14 October 2026

Valentina Alejandra Peña Marchant (born 10 August 2006) is a Chilean footballer who plays as a midfielder for Universidad Católica and the Chile national team.

== Club career ==
Born in Valdivia, Chile, Peña represented the Windsor School's team the Universidad Austral youth team and Deportes Valdivia before joining the Universidad Católica youth ranks.

With the Universidad Católica under-17 team, Peña won the national champiosnhip in 2022, 2023 and 2024. She made her senior debut in 2023 and signed her first professional in January 2025.

== International career ==
Peña represented Chile at under-17 level in the 2022 South American Championship.

In 2026, Peña represented the under-20's in the South American Championship and the South American Games, winning the silver medal.

At senior level, Peña received her first call-up for the 2025–26 CONMEBOL Nations League matches against Peru and Paraguay in November and December 2025. The next year, she was included in the squad for the friendly matches against Bolivia in October 2026, making her debut in the 7–0 win on 11 October.

== Honours ==
Chile U20

- South American Games Silver medal: 2026
