= Isidora Flores Vitta =

Chilean footballer

Personal information
- Full name: Isidora Anaiz Flores Vitta
- Date of birth: 13 April 2008 (age 18)
- Place of birth: Chile
- Height: 1.72 m (5 ft 8 in)
- Position: Centre-back

Team information
- Current team: Universidad Católica
- Number: 2

Youth career
- Universidad Católica

Senior career*
Years	Team	Apps	(Gls)
2025–	Universidad Católica	5	(0)

International career^{‡}
2025	Chile U17	8	(1)
2026–	Chile U20	4	(0)
2026–	Chile	1	(0)
Medal record
Women's football
Representing Chile
South American Games
Silver medal – second place	2026 Santa Fe	Team
- * Club domestic league appearances and goals as of 13 October 2026 ‡ National team caps and goals as of 13 October 2026

Isidora Anaiz Flores Vitta (born 13 April 2008), known as Isidora Flores Vitta, is a Chilean footballer who plays as a centre-back for Universidad Católica and the Chile national team.

== Club career ==
A product of Universidad Católica, Flores Vitta was promoted to the first team in 2026 and signed her first professional contract on 9 January.

== International career ==
Flores Vitta represented Chile at under-17 level in the 2025 South American Championship.

In September 2026, Flores Vitta represented the under-20's in the South American Games, winning the silver medal.

At senior level, Flores received her first call-up to the Chile squad for the friendly matches against Bolivia in October 2026, making her debut in the 7–0 win on 11 October.

== Honours ==
Chile U20

- South American Games Silver medal: 2026
