= Anaís Álvarez =

Chilean footballer (born 2007)

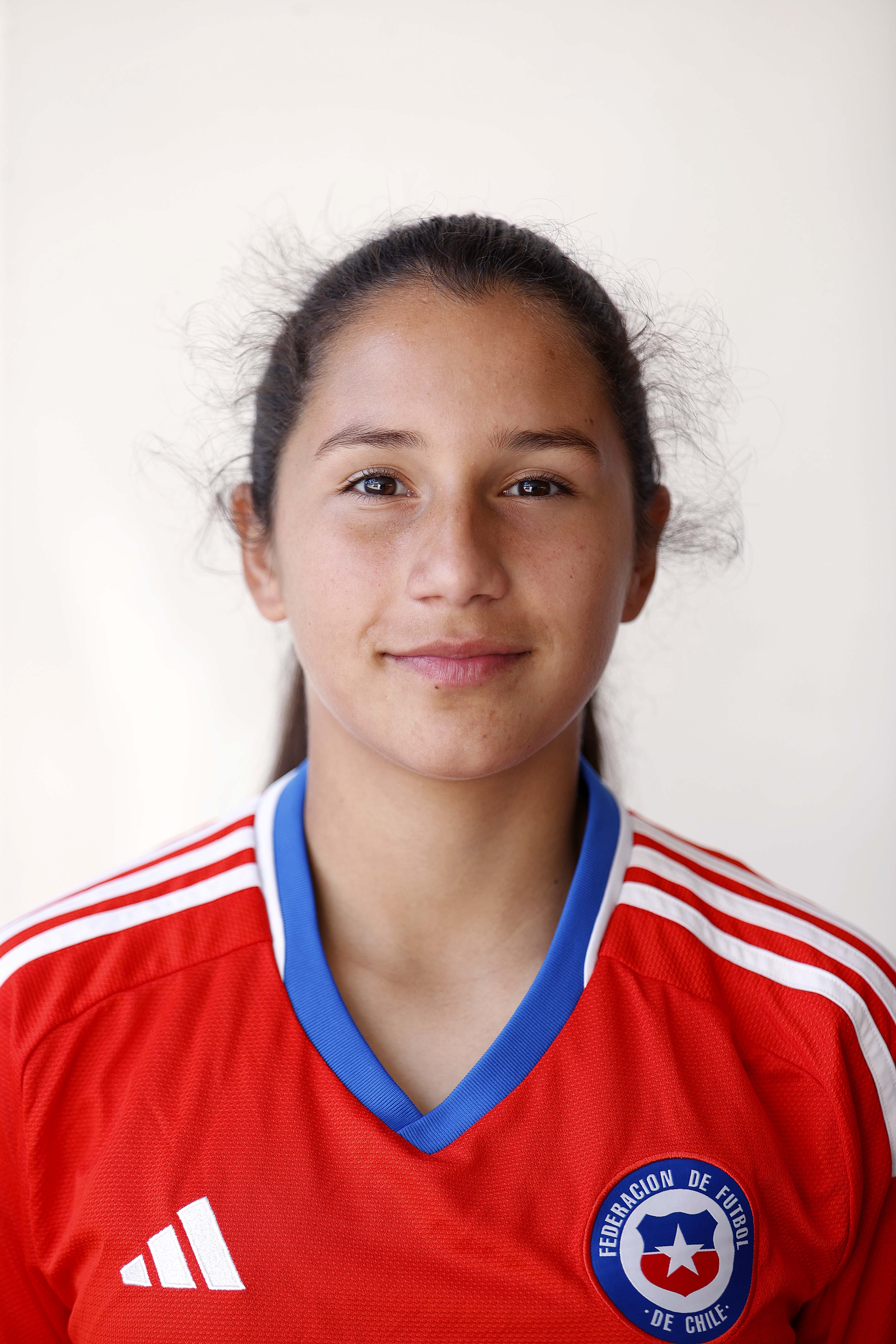
- Álvarez with Chile in 2025

Personal information
- Full name: Anaís Alexandra Álvarez Portilla
- Date of birth: 4 July 2007 (age 19)
- Place of birth: Santiago, Chile
- Height: 1.54 m (5 ft 1 in)
- Position: Midfielder

Team information
- Current team: Colo-Colo
- Number: 25

Youth career
- Colo-Colo

Senior career*
Years	Team	Apps	(Gls)
2023–	Colo-Colo		

International career^{‡}
2022–2024	Chile U17	14	(1)
2023–	Chile	6	(0)
2026	Chile U20	4	(3)
Medal record
Women's football
Representing Chile
Pan American Games
Silver medal – second place	2023 Santiago	Team
South American Games
Silver medal – second place	2026 Santa Fe	Team
- * Club domestic league appearances and goals ‡ National team caps and goals as of 7 November 2023

Anaís Alexandra Álvarez Portilla (born 4 July 2007) is a Chilean footballer who plays as a midfielder for Colo-Colo and the Chile women's national team.

== Club career ==
A product of the Colo-Colo youth system, she was promoted to the first team for the 2023 season following strong performances in preseason matches against the Punta Arenas city team and Peruvian side Alianza Lima. She scored her first professional goal against Cobresal on the first matchday of the 2023. At international level, she became the youngest player to debut in the 2023 Copa Libertadores Femenina after appearing in the 4–0 win against Libertad-Limpeño.

== International career ==
In 2022, she represented Chile at under-17 level in both the South American Championship and the World Cup. At the World Cup, she was selected as the best player in the first match against New Zealand.

At senior level, she made her debut in a 3–0 win against New Zealand on 23 September 2023 in Santiago, Chile.

She was included in the Chile squad for the 2023 Pan American Games after teammate Javiera Grez withdrew due to injury. Chile won the silver medal in the tournament. She made two appearances, providing an assist in the match against Jamaica.

In 2024, she was included in the Chile squad for the South American U-17 Championship. The following year, she was included in the national squad for the 2025 Copa América Femenina.

In September 2026, Álvarez represented the under-20's in the South American Games, winning the silver medal.

== Honours ==
Colo-Colo

- Campeonato Nacional Fútbol Femenino (4): 2023, 2024, 2025, 2026

Chile

- Pan American Games Silver Medal: 2023

Chile U20

- * South American Games Silver medal: 2026

Individual

- Premios FutFem - Best Youth Player: 2023
- Premios FutFem - Revelation Player: 2023
