= Camila Sáez =

Chilean footballer (born 1994)

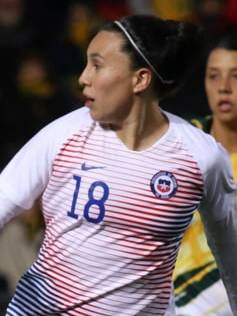
- Sáez with Chile in 2019

Personal information
- Full name: Camila Alejandra Sáez Oyaneder
- Date of birth: 17 October 1994 (age 32)
- Place of birth: Viña del Mar, Chile
- Height: 1.67 m (5 ft 6 in)
- Position: Centre-back

Team information
- Current team: Valencia
- Number: 18

Senior career*
Years	Team	Apps	(Gls)
2008–2009	Unión La Calera		
2010	Everton		
2011	Cobreloa		
2012–2017	Colo-Colo		
2018	Tacón		
2018–2022	Rayo Vallecano	97	(8)
2022–2023	Alavés Gloriosas	29	(3)
2023–2024	Madrid CFF	28	(0)
2024–2026	West Ham United	8	(0)
2025–2026	→ Bristol City (loan)	13	(2)
2026–	Valencia	0	(0)

International career^{‡}
2010	Chile U17	3	(0)
2011–	Chile	102	(11)
Medal record
Women's football
Representing Chile
Pan American Games
Silver medal – second place	2023 Santiago	Team
South American Games
Silver medal – second place	2014 Santiago	Team
- * Club domestic league appearances and goals as of 8 July 2026 ‡ National team caps and goals as of 13:55, 13 June 2019 (UTC)

Camila Alejandra Sáez Oyaneder (Latin American Spanish: [kaˈmila aleˈxandɾa ˈsaes oʝaneˈðeɾ]; born 17 October 1994) is a Chilean professional footballer who plays as a centre-back for Spanish club Valencia.

== Club career ==
As a player of CD TACON, she coincided with her compatriot Valentina Lefort.

In the second half of 2024, Sáez signed with English club West Ham United.

On 28 August 2025, it was announced that Sáez had joined Women's Super League 2 club Bristol City on loan. After returning to West Ham United, she left them in June 2026.

On 7 July 2026, Sáez signed with Spanish club Valencia on a deal until 30 June 2028.

== International career ==
Sáez represented Chile at the 2010 FIFA U-17 Women's World Cup. At the senior level, she scored two goals at the 2018 Copa América Femenina, where Chile qualified for a FIFA Women's World Cup for the first time in its history.

She represented Chile at the 2023 Pan American Games, where Chile won the silver medal. Following the semi-final match against the United States, she returned to her club, Madrid CFF.

=== International goals ===
Scores and results list Chile's goal tally first

No.	Date	Venue	Opponent	Score	Result	Competition
1.	18 December 2013	Estádio Nacional Mané Garrincha, Brasília, Brazil	Scotland	4–2	4–2	2013 International Women's Football Tournament of Brasília
2.	28 May 2017	Estadio Nacional Julio Martínez Prádanos, Santiago, Chile	Peru	5–0	12–0	Friendly
3.	24 October 2017	Estadio Diaguita, Ovalle, Chile	Argentina	1–0	5–0	Friendly
4.	6 April 2018	Estadio La Portada, La Serena, Chile	Colombia	1–1	1–1	2018 Copa América Femenina
5.	22 April 2018	Estadio La Portada, La Serena, Chile	Argentina	1–0	4–0	2018 Copa América Femenina
6.	9 November 2019	Bankwest Stadium, Sydney, Australia	Australia	1–2	1–2	Friendly
7.	4 March 2020	Starlight Sport Complex, Antalya, Turkey	Ghana	2–0	3–0	2020 Turkish Women's Cup
8.	10 April 2021	Arslan Zeki Demirci Sports Complex, Antalya, Turkey	Cameroon	1–0	2–1	2020 Summer Olympics qualification
9.	14 July 2022	Estadio Olímpico Pascual Guerrero, Cali, Colombia	Ecuador	1–0	2–1	2022 Copa América Femenina
10.	29 May 2024	Estadio Cementos Progreso, Guatemala City, Guatemala	Guatemala	1–1	3–4	Friendly
11.	1 June 2024	Estadio Cementos Progreso, Guatemala City, Guatemala	Guatemala	4–1	6–1	Friendly

== Honours ==
Chile

- South American Games Silver medal: 2014
- Pan American Games Silver Medal: 2023

== See also ==
- List of women's footballers with 100 or more international caps
