= Amparo Abarca =

Chilean footballer

Personal information
- Full name: Amparo Montserrat Abarca Urzúa
- Date of birth: 8 August 2009 (age 17)
- Place of birth: Santiago, Chile
- Position: Midfielder

Team information
- Current team: Universidad Católica
- Number: 58

Youth career
- Universidad Católica

Senior career*
Years	Team	Apps	(Gls)
2025–	Universidad Católica	3	(0)

International career^{‡}
2025	Chile U17	9	(0)
2025–	Chile U20	10	(1)
2026–	Chile	1	(0)
Medal record
Women's football
Representing Chile
South American Games
Silver medal – second place	2026 Santa Fe	Team
- * Club domestic league appearances and goals as of 23 September 2026 ‡ National team caps and goals as of 23 February 2026

Amparo Montserrat Abarca Urzúa (born 8 August 2009) is a Chilean footballer who plays as a midfielder for Universidad Católica and the Chile national team.

== Club career ==
A product of the women's team of Universidad Católica, Abarca was selected the best teammate of the under-16's in December 2023. She made her senior debut in the 2–0 win against Huachipato on 13 September 2025 for the Primera División.

== International career ==
Abarca has represented Chile at both the 2025 South American U17 Championship and the 2026 South American U20 Championship. She has also played in friendlies for both categories. In September 2026, she represented the under-20's in the South American Games, winning the silver medal.

At senior level, Abarca received her first call-up and made his debut with Chile in the friendly match against United States on 27 January 2026.

== Honours ==
Chile U20

- South American Games Silver medal: 2026
