= Pamela Cabezas =

Chilean footballer

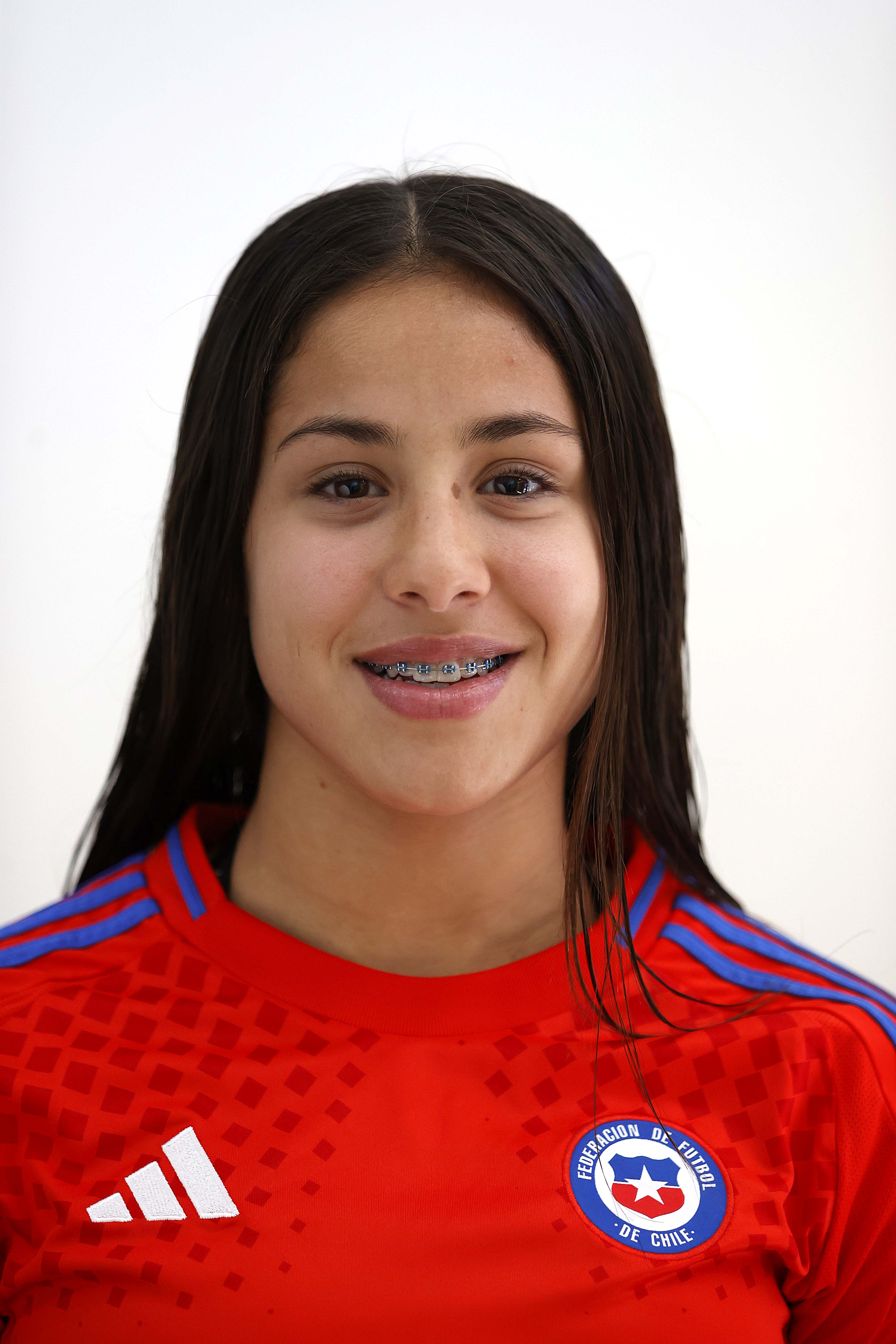
- Cabezas López with Chile in 2025

Personal information
- Full name: Pamela Antonia Cabezas López
- Date of birth: 10 July 2007 (age 19)
- Place of birth: Chile
- Height: 1.64 m (5 ft 5 in)
- Position: Forward

Team information
- Current team: Universidad Católica
- Number: 9

Youth career
- Universidad Católica

Senior career*
Years	Team	Apps	(Gls)
2023–	Universidad Católica		

International career^{‡}
2024	Chile U17	3	(2)
2024–2026	Chile U20	8	(0)
2025–	Chile	7	(3)
Medal record
Women's football
Representing Chile
South American Games
Silver medal – second place	2026 Santa Fe	Team
- * Club domestic league appearances and goals ‡ National team caps and goals as of 23 September 2026

Pamela Antonia Cabezas López (born 10 July 2007) is a Chilean footballer who plays as a forward for Universidad Católica and the Chile women's national team.

== Club career ==
A product of the women's team of Universidad Católica, Cabezas won thee youth championships with them and was awarded as the best female player from the youth ranks in 2022 and 2024. She made her debut with the first team in 2023 and signed her first professional contract alongside her teammate Vaitiare Pardo in January 2024.

== International career ==
Cabezas has represented Chile at both the 2024 South American U17 Championship and the 2024 South American U20 Championship.

At senior level, she received her first call-up for two friendlies against Ecuador in October 2024. She was called up again for the friendlies against Haiti on 4 and 8 April 2025, made her debut in the first match and scored the winning goal in the second match.

In September 2026, Cabezas López represented the under-20's in the South American Games, winning the silver medal.

== Personal life ==
She is nicknamed Monita (Little Monkey).

== Honours ==
Chile U20

- South American Games Silver medal: 2026
