= Geraldine Mardones =

Chilean footballer

Personal information
- Full name: Geraldine Solange Mardones Velásquez
- Date of birth: 20 December 2008 (age 17)
- Place of birth: Coyhaique, Chile
- Height: 1.68 m (5 ft 6 in)
- Position: Left winger

Team information
- Current team: Colo-Colo
- Number: 19

Youth career
- Colo-Colo

Senior career*
Years	Team	Apps	(Gls)
2026–	Colo-Colo	7	(5)

International career^{‡}
2024–2025	Chile U17	12	(0)
2026–	Chile U20	4	(1)
2026–	Chile	1	(0)
Medal record
Women's football
Representing Chile
South American Games
Silver medal – second place	2026 Santa Fe	Team
- * Club domestic league appearances and goals as of 14 October 2026 ‡ National team caps and goals as of 14 October 2026

Geraldine Solange Mardones Velásquez (born 20 December 2008) is a Chilean footballer who plays as a left winger for Colo-Colo and the Chile national team.

== Club career ==
Born in Coyhaique, Chile, Mardones is a product of Colo-Colo. She made her professional debut in the 0–4 away victory against Palestino on 13 May 2026, aged 17. Later, she was included in the squad for the 2026 Copa Libertadores.

== International career ==
Mardones represented Chile at under-17 level in both the 2024 and the 2025 South American Championship.

In September 2026, Mardones represented the under-20's in the South American Games, winning the silver medal. She scored the first goal in the 3–2 win against Paraguay.

At senior level, Mardones received her first call-up to the Chile squad for the friendly matches against Bolivia in October 2026, making her debut in the 7–0 win on 11 October.

== Honours ==
Colo-Colo

- Primera División de Chile: 2026

Chile U20

- South American Games Silver medal: 2026
