= Natsumy Millones =

Chilean footballer

Personal information
- Full name: Natsumy Sahomy Millones Bugueño
- Date of birth: 1 January 2007 (age 19)
- Place of birth: Coquimbo, Chile
- Height: 1.61 m (5 ft 3 in)
- Position: Left winger

Team information
- Current team: Coquimbo Unido
- Number: 11

Youth career
- Unión Bellavista
- Deportivo Marfil
- Las Lobas
- 2019–2021: Coquimbo Unido

Senior career*
Years	Team	Apps	(Gls)
2022–	Coquimbo Unido	29+	(7+)

International career^{‡}
2022–2024	Chile U17	14	(2)
2026–	Chile U20	3	(0)
2026–	Chile	1	(0)
Medal record
Women's football
Representing Chile
South American Games
Silver medal – second place	2026 Santa Fe	Team
- * Club domestic league appearances and goals as of 13 October 2026 ‡ National team caps and goals as of 13 October 2026

Natsumy Sahomy Millones Bugueño (born 1 January 2007) is a Chilean footballer who plays as a left winger for Coquimbo Unido and the Chile national team.

== Club career ==
Born in Coquimbo, Chile, Millones was with local clubs Unión Bellavista, Deportivo Marfil and Las Lobas before joining the Coquimbo Unido youth ranks at the age of 12. She made her senior debut at the age of 15, winning the 2022 Primera B. In March 2023, she became the first female player to sign a professional contract with the club, aged 16.

With Coquimbo Unido, she reached the Chilean Primera División semi-finals in 2023 and 2024. In February 2025, she suffered convulsions and fainted while training with her club. Diagnosed with refractory epilepsy, she returned to the activity in August of the same year.

== International career ==
Millones has represented Chile at under-17 level in the 2022 South American Championship, the 2022 FIFA World Cup and the 2024 South American Championship.

In September 2026, Millones represented the under-20's in the South American Games, winning the silver medal.

At senior level, Millones received her first call-up to the Chile squad for the friendly matches against Bolivia in October 2026, making her debut in the 7–0 win on 11 October.

== Honours ==
Coquimbo Unido

- Primera B: 2022

Chile U20

- South American Games Silver medal: 2026
