= Francisca Vargas =

Chilean footballer

Personal information
- Full name: Francisca Ignacia Vargas Contreras
- Date of birth: 21 July 2006 (age 20)
- Place of birth: San Bernardo, Santiago, Chile
- Height: 1.66 m (5 ft 5 in)
- Position: Winger

Team information
- Current team: Universidad de Chile
- Number: 27

Youth career
- 2021–2022: Rangers
- 2023: Universidad de Chile

Senior career*
Years	Team	Apps	(Gls)
2021–2022	Rangers	7	(4)
2023–	Universidad de Chile	8	(1)

International career^{‡}
2026–	Chile	1	(0)
- * Club domestic league appearances and goals as of 29 January 2026 ‡ National team caps and goals as of 29 January 2026

Francisca Ignacia Vargas Contreras (born 21 July 2006) is a Chilean footballer who plays as a winger for Universidad de Chile.

== Club career ==
In 2021 and 2022, Vargas played for Rangers de Talca.

In 2023, Vargas switched to Universidad de Chile and scored her first goal with them in the 2025 season.

== International career ==
Vargas took part in training sessions of Chile U17 with views to the 2022 FIFA World Cup. In January 2026, she was called up to train with the under-20's with views to the 2026 South American Championship.

At senior level, Vargas received her first call-up and made his debut with Chile in the friendly match against United States on 27 January 2026.
