= Vaitiare Pardo =

Chilean footballer

Personal information
- Full name: Vaitiare Anahí Pardo Pinilla
- Date of birth: 20 August 2007 (age 19)
- Place of birth: Chile
- Position: Forward

Team information
- Current team: Universidad Católica
- Number: 11

Youth career
- Universidad Católica

Senior career*
Years	Team	Apps	(Gls)
2022–	Universidad Católica		

International career^{‡}
2024	Chile U17	4	(0)
2025–	Chile	20	(3)
2026	Chile U20	4	(2)
Medal record
Women's football
Representing Chile
South American Games
Silver medal – second place	2026 Santa Fe	Team
- * Club domestic league appearances and goals ‡ National team caps and goals as of 23 September 2026

Vaitiare Anahí Pardo Pinilla (born 20 August 2007) is a Chilean footballer who plays as a forward for Universidad Católica and the Chile women's national team.

== Club career ==
A product of the women's team of Universidad Católica, Pardo won thee youth championships with them. She made her debut with the first team at the age of 15 and signed her first professional contract in January 2024.

== International career ==
Pardo represented Chile at under-17 level in the 2024 South American Championship at the same time she was a member of the Chile under-20 team.

At senior level, she received her first call-up for two friendlies against Argentina in February 2025. She made her debut in the first match on 22 February.

In September 2026, Pardo represented the under-20's in the South American Games, winning the silver medal.

=== International goals ===
Scores and results list Uruguay's goal tally first

No.	Date	Venue	Opponent	Score	Result	Competition
1	18 April 2026	Estadio Centenario, Montevideo, Uruguay	Uruguay	3–1	3–1	2025–26 CONMEBOL Women's Nations League
2	5 June 2026	Estadio Nacional Julio Martínez Prádanos, Santiago, Chile	Ecuador	1–1	1–2	2025–26 CONMEBOL Women's Nations League

== Personal life ==
She is the daughter of Sebastián Pardo and the niece of Mauricio Pinilla, both former Chile international footballers.

== Honours ==
Chile U20

- South American Games Silver medal: 2026

Individual

- Primera División Ideal Team: 2025
