= Valentina Lefort =

Chilean footballer (born 1988)

Personal information
- Full name: Valentina Alejandra Lefort Quezada
- Date of birth: 26 January 1988 (age 38)
- Place of birth: Santiago, Chile
- Height: 1.65 m (5 ft 5 in)
- Positions: Defender; midfielder

College career
Years	Team	Apps	(Gls)
2010–2015	UTSA Roadrunners		

Senior career*
Years	Team	Apps	(Gls)
2002–2009	Universidad de Chile		
2015	Colo-Colo		
2015–2016	ŽNK Pomurje		
2016	RBB Féminas		
2016–2017	CD TACON	3	(0)
2017–2020	CD Samper	31	(10)
2020–2021	Leganés	2	(0)
2021–2022	CD Móstoles URJC	10	(0)

International career
2008	Chile U20		
2011	Chile	3	(0)
- * Club domestic league appearances and goals

Valentina Alejandra Lefort Quezada (born 26 January 1988) is a Chilean footballer who plays as a defender or midfielder. She last played for Spanish side CD Móstoles URJC.

== Club career ==
Lefort began her career with Universidad de Chile.

In 2010, she emigrated to the United States to study at the University of Texas at San Antonio and played for UTSA Roadrunners. Back in Chile, she joined Colo-Colo in February 2015. In the second half of the same year, she moved to Europe and signed with Slovenian club ŽNK Pomurje, making three appearances in the 2015–16 UEFA Champions League.

In 2016, she moved to Spain and joined RBB Féminas. She made her home in that country, playing after for CD TACON, coinciding with her compatriot Camila Sáez, CD Samper, CD Leganés and CD Móstoles URJC.

== International career ==
In 2008, Lefort represented Chile U20 in both the South American Championship and the World Cup.

In 2011, she represented the senior team in the Algarve Cup alongside her teammate María José Rojas.

== Personal life ==
At the same time she was a player of Universidad de Chile, she attended the Pontifical Catholic University of Valparaíso to study mechanical engineering.

Lefort got an economics degree at the University of Texas at San Antonio and has mainly developed her profession in Spain.

== Honours ==
UTSA Roadrunners

- Southland Conference: 2010
