= Football at the 2026 South American Games =

Football competitions at the 2026 South American Games

- Venue: Estadio Marcelo Bielsa (men's); Asociación Rosarina de Fútbol (women's)
- Dates: September 16–25

Football competitions at the 2026 South American Games in Rosario, Santa Fe, and Rafaela, Argentina, werw held between September 16 and 25. The two tournaments were held at different venues: the men's tournament took place at Estadio Marcelo Bielsa, located within Parque de la Independencia in Rosario, while the women's took place at Asociación Rosarina de Fútbol, within Museo del Deporte Santafesino in Santa Fe.

A total of two tournaments were contested (men and women). Both tournaments had age limits, the men's tournament was restricted to under-19 players (born on or after 1 January 2007) while women's tournament was restricted to under-20 players (born on or after 1 January 2006).

Paraguay won the men's tournament while Venezuela won the women's competition. In both cases, the title was defined after a penalty shoot-out.

== Participating nations ==
A total of 8 ODESUR nations registered teams for the football events. Each nation was able to enter a maximum of 36 athletes (one team of 18 players per gender). Argentina, Colombia, Panama and Peru will compete in the men's event while the other six nations will compete in both events.

- Argentina (18 players)
- Chile (36)
- Colombia (18)
- Panama (18)
- Paraguay (36)
- Peru (18)
- Uruguay (36)
- Venezuela (36)

== Venues ==
Rosario
Estadio Marcelo Bielsa	Estadio Asociación Rosarina
Capacity: 49,000	Capacity: n/a

Estadio Marcelo Bielsa hosted nearly all the matches of the men's tournament. Located within Parque de la Independencia in the city of Rosario, and inaugurated in 1911, it is the home ground of club Newell's Old Boys. The venue did not have any official name until December 22, 2009, when it was named after the former coach of the club Marcelo Bielsa. Until then it was simply called El Coloso del Parque ("The Colossus of the Park"), and this remained as the stadium's popular name. Although the stadium is currently used mostly for football matches, it has hosted some rugby union games sometimes, albeit rarely.

Since its opening in 1911, the stadium has been refurbished and expanded several times since. It currently has a capacity of 49,000.

The other venue was the Asociación Rosarina de Fútbol Stadium, located on a former army battalion in the southern part of the city. The ARF's sports complex also included an artificial turf pitch, dressing rooms, and futsal facilities. After the games, the complex will be used by teams affiliated to Asociación Rosarina. The venue hosted all the women's competition matches and one match of the men's tournament.

== Medal summary ==
=== Medal table ===
* Host nation (Argentina)

Rank	Nation	Gold	Silver	Bronze	Total
1	Paraguay	1	0	0	1
1	Venezuela	1	0	0	1
3	Argentina*	0	1	0	1
3	Chile	0	1	0	1
5	Peru	0	0	1	1
5	Uruguay	0	0	1	1
Totals (6 entries)		2	2	2	6

=== Medalists ===
Event	Gold	Silver	Bronze
Men's tournament	Paraguay; Leonardo Sosa; Mateo Giménez; Mauro Coronel; Marcelo Chaparro; José Buhring; Giovanni Gómez; Junior Gamarra; Orlando Cristaldo; Rodrigo Vera; Eduardo Delmas; César Miño; Jeremias Villanueva; Thiago Fernández; Kevin Amarilla; Joaquín Bogarin; Lucas Montiel; Pedro Sarza; Milan Freyres	Argentina; Maximo Leguizamon; Fernando Closter; Joaquín Salas; Thiago Pérez; Leandro Olima; Matías Satas; Felipe Esquivel; Santiago Espindola; Uriel Ojeda; Ian Subiabre; Facundo Jainikoski; Demian Talavera; Nicolás Marcipar; Santiago Silveira; Pedro Pascual; Ramiro Tulian; Facundo Carrizo; Franco Domínguez	Peru; Fabrisio Mesias; Duham Ballumbrosio; Samuel Pereda; Jonathan García; Joaquín Verde; Santiago Berckemeyer; Jair Moretti; Carlos Aramburu; Nicolás Rengifo; Piero Cari; José Mellan; Fernando Lasanta; Dyland Maceda; Eystin Cordova; Pirlo Oba; Gerson Castillo; Lionel Herrera; Marco Rivas
Women's tournament	Venezuela; Valeria Rebanales; María Ávila; Karla Alfonzo; Dariana Medina; Valeria Rojas; Abril Alejo; Juneski Flores; Astrid Granadillo; Orliany Durán; Andrea Suárez; Anabella Figueredo; Camila Pérez; Diana Molina; Migleydys Bolsegui; Diana Bravo; Valery Núñez; Anna González; Camila Leal	Chile; Oriana Cristancho; Gabriela García; Isidora Flores; Antonella Puelles; Amparo Abarca; Antonella Martínez; Vaitiare Pardo; Maite Avello; Pamela Cabezas; Anais Álvarez; Geraldine Mardones; Fernanda Álvarez; Maite Martínez; Catalina Muñoz; Valentina Peña; Vaythyare Ríos; Natsumy Millones; Florencia Gálvez	Uruguay; Romina Olmedo; Julieta Casanova; Rocío Frachia; Ilana Guedes; Lara Elhordoy; Martina Fuentes; Sofía Olivera; Antonella Cordero; Oriana Tola; Agustina Gómez; Isabela Pérez; Manuela Techera; Camila Rijo; Julieta Mozejko; Allegra Rodríguez; Maisha Vázquez; Erika Vidiella; Victoria Sosa

== Men's tournament ==
=== Group A ===
Pos	Team	Pld	W	D	L	GF	GA	GD	Pts	Qualification
1	Peru	3	2	0	1	4	3	+1	6	Advance to semi-finals
2	Chile	3	2	0	1	7	5	+2	6	Advance to semi-finals
3	Colombia	3	1	0	2	4	4	0	3	
4	Panama	3	1	0	2	3	6	−3	3	

Source: Results
16 Sep 2026

Colombia	2–0	Peru
Mancilla 40'; Socarrás 57'	Report

Estadio Marcelo Bielsa, Rosario
Referee: Yeferzon Miranda (Venezuela)

16 Sep 2026

Chile	4–1	Panama
Mundaca 17'; Cuevas 49'; Martínez 57'; Muñoz 77'	Report	Cuello 63'

Estadio Marcelo Bielsa, Rosario
Referee: Gabriel Mendoza (Bolivia)

18 Sep 2026

Colombia	0–1	Panama
		Graham 90+3'

Estadio Marcelo Bielsa, Rosario
Referee: Rodolfo Vera (Bolivia)

18 Sep 2026

Chile	0–2	Peru
	Report	Cari 43+3'; Mellán 55'

Estadio Marcelo Bielsa, Rosario
Referee: Carlos Parra (Venezuela)

20 Sep 2026

Colombia	2–3	Chile
García 54'; Marulanda 70'	Report	Muñoz 6', 22'; Rocha 75'

Estadio Marcelo Bielsa, Rosario
Referee: Yeferzon Miranda (Venezuela)

20 Sep 2026

Peru	2–1	Panama
García 45+1'; Castillo 74'	Report	Cuello 56'

Estadio Asociación Rosarina de Fútbol, Rosario
Referee: Rodolfo Vera (Bolivia)

=== Group B ===
Pos	Team	Pld	W	D	L	GF	GA	GD	Pts	Qualification
1	Paraguay	3	2	1	0	5	2	+3	7	Advance to semi-finals
2	Argentina	3	1	1	1	3	3	0	4	Advance to semi-finals
3	Venezuela	3	1	1	1	2	3	−1	4	
4	Uruguay	3	0	1	2	1	3	−2	1	

Source: Results
17 Sep 2026

Paraguay	2–1	Argentina
Gamarra 59'; Garza 65'	Report	Domínguez 41'

Estadio Marcelo Bielsa, Rosario
Referee: Daniel Ureta (Peru)

17 Sep 2026

Uruguay	0–1	Venezuela
	Report	Díaz 70'

Estadio Marcelo Bielsa, Rosario
Referee: Oswaldo Contreras (Colombia)

19 Sep 2026

Paraguay	2–0	Venezuela
Amarilla 38'; Delmás 40'	Report

Estadio Marcelo Bielsa, Rosario
Referee: Gabriel Mendoza (Bolivia)

19 Sep 2026

Argentina	1–0	Uruguay
Domínguez 73'	Report

Estadio Marcelo Bielsa, Rosario
Referee: Yerson Zambrano (Ecuador)

21 Sep 2026

Paraguay	1–1	Uruguay
Buhring 48'	Report	Navarro 6'

Estadio Marcelo Bielsa, Rosario
Referee: Daniel Ureta (Peru)

21 Sep 2026

Venezuela	1–1	Argentina
González 27'	Report	Tulian 90+4'

Estadio Marcelo Bielsa, Rosario
Referee: Oswaldo Contreras (Ecuador)

=== Semifinals ===
23 Sep 2026

Peru	0–1	Argentina
	Report	Espíndola 90'

Estadio Marcelo Bielsa, Rosario
Referee: Carlos Parra (Venezuela)

23 Sep 2026

Paraguay	1–0	Chile
Freyres 90+2'	Report

Estadio Marcelo Bielsa, Rosario
Referee: Yerson Zambrano (Venezuela)

=== Bronze medal match ===
23 Sep 2026

Chile	1–2	Peru
Da Rocha 88'		Cari 23'; Orellana 63' (o.g.)

Estadio Marcelo Bielsa, Rosario
Referee: Carlos Parra (Venezuela)

=== Final ===
23 Sep 2026

Paraguay	0–0	Argentina
	Report 1 Report 2
Penalties
Freyres (penalty scored); Bogarin (penalty scored); Cristaldo (penalty scored); Vera (penalty scored); Coronel (penalty scored)	5–4	(penalty scored) Esquivel; (penalty scored) Dominguez; (penalty scored) Perez; (penalty missed) Olima; (penalty scored) Jainikoski

Estadio Marcelo Bielsa, Rosario
Attendance: 49,000
Referee: Oswaldo Macías (Ecuador)

Team details

Paraguay	Argentina

GK	1	Leonardo Sosa
DF	2	Mateo Giménez
DF	3	Mauro Coronel
DF	13	Thiago Fernández
DF	14	Kevin Amarilla
MF	6	Giovanni Gómez		(substituted off) 82'
MF	15	Joaquín Bogarín
MF	7	Junior Gamarra
MF	10	Eduardo Delmás (c)	(yellow card) 22'	(substituted off) 75'
FW	17	Pedro Zarza		(substituted off) 82'
FW	5	José Buhring
Substitutions:
FW	9	Rodrigo Vera		(substituted on) 75'
MF	16	Lucas Montiel		(substituted on) 80'
MF	8	Orlando Cristaldo		(substituted on) 80'
Manager:
(Paraguay) Antolín Alcaraz

GK	1	Máximo Leguizamón	(yellow card) 45+1'
DF	2	Fernando Closter
DF	13	Nicolás Marcipar
DF	6	Matías Satas
DF	4	Joaquín Salas
MF	8	Santiago Espíndola	(yellow card) 20'
MF	3	Joaquín Salas
MF	17	Facundo Carrizo		(substituted off) 80'
FW	9	Uriel Ojeda
FW	10	Ian Subiabre	(yellow card) 45+1'	(substituted off) 73'
FW	18	Franco Domínguez
Substitutions:
FW	7	Felipe Esquivel		(substituted on) 73'
MF	5	Leandro Olima		(substituted on) 80'
Manager:
(Argentina) Diego Placente

=== Medal table ===
Pos	Team	Pld	W	D	L	GF	GA	GD	Pts	Final result
1	Paraguay	5	3	2	0	6	2	+4	11	Gold medal
2	Argentina	5	2	2	1	4	3	+1	8	Silver medal
3	Peru	5	3	0	2	6	3	+3	9	Bronze medal

Source: Here

== Women's tournament ==
=== First stage ===
Pos	Team	Pld	W	D	L	GF	GA	GD	Pts	QA
1	Chile	3	3	0	0	9	3	+6	9	Advance to Gold Medal match
2	Venezuela	3	2	0	1	3	3	0	6	Advance to Gold Medal match
3	Paraguay	3	1	0	2	3	5	−2	3	Advance to Bronze Medal match
4	Uruguay	3	0	0	3	1	5	−4	0	Advance to Bronze Medal match

Source: Results
16 Sep 2026

Venezuela	2–0	Paraguay
Bolsegui 32'; Bravo 86'	Report

Asociación Rosarina, Rosario
Referee: Gleika Oliveira (Brazil)

16 Sep 2026

Uruguay	1–3	Chile
Tola 79'	Report	Muñoz 30'; Alvarez 82', 90+2'

Asociación Rosarina, Rosario
Referee: Luciana Sánchez (Argentina)

18 Sep 2026

Venezuela	0–3	Chile
	Report	Abarca 22'; Pardo 33'; Muñoz 45+3'

Asociación Rosarina, Rosario
Referee: Jhanet Portugal (Bolivia)

18 Sep 2026

Uruguay	0–1	Paraguay
	Report	Saldívar 89'

Asociación Rosarina, Rosario
Referee: Karen Lozano (Colombia)

20 Sep 2026

Venezuela	1–0	Uruguay
Bravo 32'	Report

Asociación Rosarina, Rosario
Referee: Karen Lozano (Colombia)

20 Sep 2026

Paraguay	2–3	Chile
Villalba 47'; Paiva 69'	Report	Mardones 41'; Alvarez 56' (pen.); Pardo 82'

Asociación Rosarina, Rosario
Referee: Gleika Oliveira (Brazil)

=== Bronze medal match ===
23 Sep 2026

Paraguay	1–1	Uruguay
Amarilla 75' (pen.)	Report	Vidiella 23'
Penalties
	2–4

Asociación Rosarina, Rosario
Referee: Daniel Ureta (Peru)

=== Final ===
23 Sep 2026

Chile	1–1	Venezuela
Martínez 49'	Report	Alfonzo 90+1' (pen.)
Penalties
Alvarez (penalty scored); Martínez (penalty missed); Mardones (penalty scored); Pardo (penalty missed)	2–4	(penalty scored) Alfonzo; (penalty scored) Alejo; (penalty scored) Rebanales; (penalty scored) Suárez

Asociación Rosarina, Rosario
Referee: Luciana Sánchez (Argentina)

Team details

Chile	Venezuela

GK	1	Valeria Rebanales
DF	2	Gabriela García
DF	3	Isidora Flores	(yellow card) 45+1'
DF	4	Antonella Puelles
DF	18	Florencia Galvez
MF	5	Amparo Abarca
FW	7	Vaitiare Pardo
FW	9	Pamela Cabezas		(substituted off) 18'
FW	11	Geraldine Mardones
FW	14	Catalina Muñoz		(substituted off) 87'
Substitutions:
MF	6	Antonella Martínez	(substituted on) 18'	(yellow card) 41'
DF	15	Valentina Peña		(substituted on) 87'
Manager:
(Chile) Luis Mena

GK	1	Oriana Cristancho
DF	2	María Avila		(substituted off) 67'
DF	3	Karla Alfonzo
DF	4	Abril Alejo
MF	7	Juneski Flores
MF	8	Astrid Granadillo		(substituted off) 67'
MF	14	Migleydys Bolsegui	(yellow card) 68'
FW	9	Orliany Durán	(yellow card) 45+1'	(substituted off) 66'
FW	10	Andrea Suárez
FW	15	Diana Bravo	(yellow card) 78'
Substitutions:
MF	16	Valery Nuñez		(substituted on) 66'
MF	11	Anabella Figueredo		(substituted on) 67'
DF	18	Camila Leal		(substituted on) 67'
Manager:
(Venezuela) Dayana Frías

=== Medal table ===
Pos	Team	Pld	W	D	L	GF	GA	GD	Pts	Final result
1	Venezuela	4	2	1	1	4	4	0	7	Gold medal
2	Chile	4	3	1	0	10	4	+6	10	Silver medal
3	Uruguay	4	0	1	3	1	6	−5	1	Bronze medal

Source: Herre
