= Estadio Marcelo Bielsa =

Football stadium in Rosario, Argentina

Coordinates: 32°57′22″S 60°39′41″W

Marcelo Bielsa Stadium
- Estadio Marcelo Bielsa
- Coloso del Parque
- Aerial view of the stadium in 2026
- Interactive map of Marcelo Bielsa Stadium
- Address: Av. Int. Morcillo 2501; Rosario; Argentina
- Owner: Newell's Old Boys
- Capacity: 49,000
- Type: Stadium
- Surface: Grass
- Field size: 105 x 70 m
- Current use: Football

Construction
- Opened: 23 July 1911; 115 years ago
- Expanded: 1918, 1925, 1929, 1979, 1996–1997, 2009, 2025

Tenants
- Newell's Old Boys (1911–present); 2001 FIFA u20 World Cup; 2010 IRB u20 World Cup (rugby); 2026 South American Games (football)

Estadio Marcelo A. Bielsa is a football stadium located within Parque de la Independencia in the city of Rosario, Argentina. Inaugurated in 1911, it is the home ground of club Newell's Old Boys. The venue did not have any official name until December 22, 2009, when it was named after the former coach of the club Marcelo Bielsa. Until then it was simply called El Coloso del Parque ("The Colossus of the Park"), and this remained as the stadium's popular name.

Since its opening in 1911, the stadium has been refurbished and expanded several times since. It currently has a capacity of 49,000.

== History ==
=== Previous fields ===
The first pitch or "field" as it was called at that time was located between the streets Boulevard Humberto First and Avellaneda, in the northwest of the city of Rosario, in the neighborhood of the workshops. The same was achieved through management by Claudio Newell (son of Isaac Newell, founder of the club), and was opened in 1905. It was the scene of the beginning of the meetings at that time the Football League Rosarina. The same had few amenities: had only a small box lumber modest. Due to this and the growth of the club, he found a new space for the field.

In 1907, thanks to the efforts of the then Mayor of Rosario, Nicasio Vila, who ceded some land, the field moved to the block between Avenue United Provinces streets, San Luis and La Rioja, in the neighborhood Vila, in the west corner of the city.

=== Parque de la Independencia ===
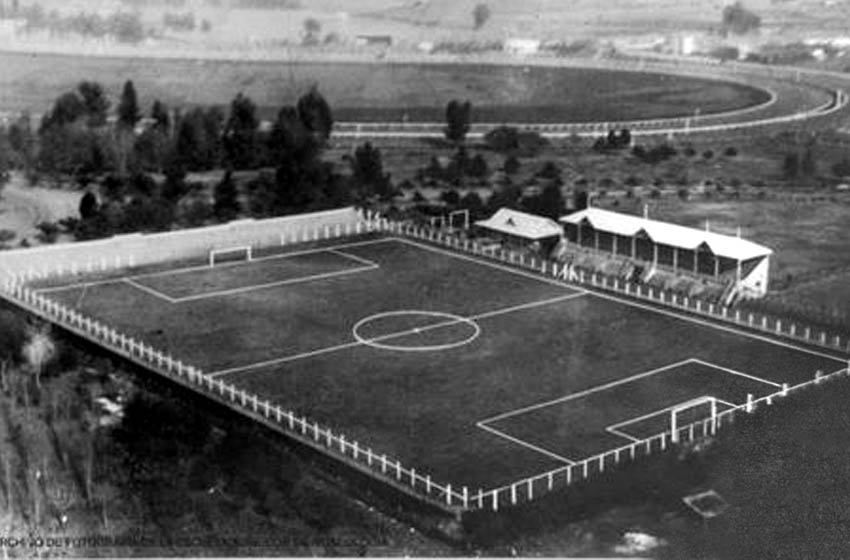
The stadium during its first years

On July 23, 1911, Newell's Old Boys opened their new stadium in the Parque de la Independencia in the heart of Rosario. The stadium's design was in line with English stadiums of the time.

The original stadium was a wooden stand, and has in the years since had multiple additions to bring it to its current form. On July 9, 1918, the stadium debuted its first expansion, an iron and wooden stand for 3,000 spectators, bringing total capacity to 10,000. In 1925, the club built the north end stands. On May 26, 1929, the stadium's western stand opened, which was the first made of cement, and covered with a roof.

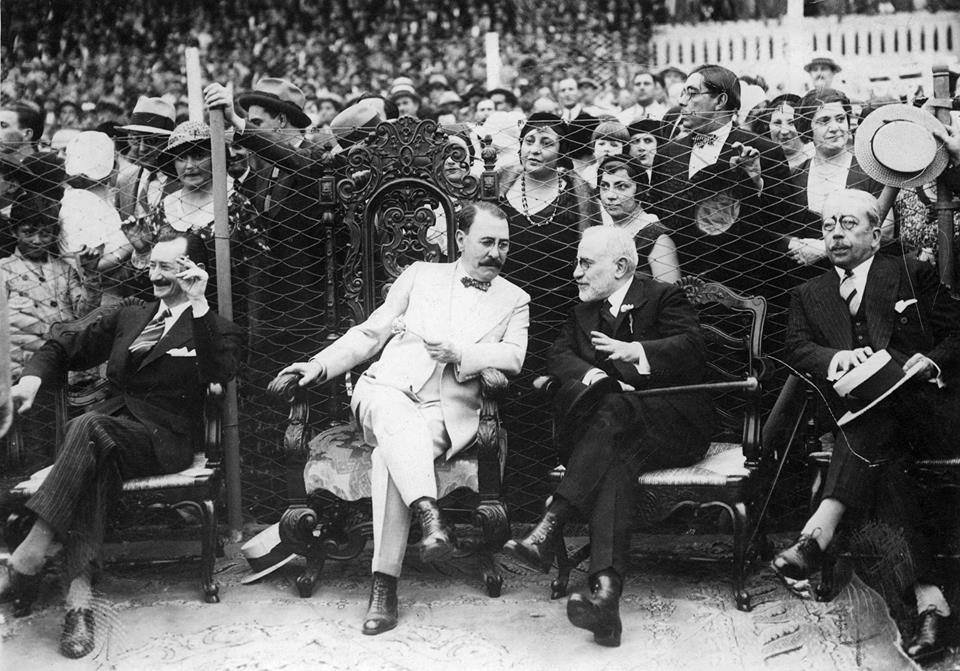
Fltr: Gral. José Uriburu, Lisandro de la Torre, and Leopoldo Lugones attending a match at the stadium in 1931

By 1930, Newell's had a stadium that could seat 30,000 spectators. Between 1971 and 1973, the stadium was completed with cement stands, and various other improvements and expansions.

In the 1990s, the club completed two new stands that elevated the stadium's capacity to 40,000, which took the nickname of "El Coloso del Parque" (The Colossus of the Park). The south stand was later named after superstar Diego Maradona, who had a brief tenure on Newell's as player in September 1993.

Since December 2008, the stadium has undergone continuous changes. At the end of 2009, the club decided to name the stadium after Marcelo Bielsa, and the Western concourse after Gerardo Martino, both former players and managers that had been relegated from the club during the presidency of Eduardo José López (1994–2008).

The stadium hosted rugby union matches during the 2010 IRB Junior World Championship, when the Coloso del Parque was chosen as the tournament's main venue. Pool B matches, semifinals, and the finals were played at Estadio Marcelo Bielsa.

Coinciding with his 40th birthday, a stand was named after club captain Maxi Rodríguez in January 2021.

In 2024, the Newell's Old Boys drew an average home attendance of 41,708. In 2025, in honor of the 38th birthday of Lionel Messi, Newell's named one of the stands with the name of the number 10 player which was a former player and is a supporter.

== Events ==
=== 2001 FIFA U20 World Cup ===
The first international football tournament at Marcelo Bielsa Stadium was in 2001 when the stadium was chosen as one of the venues for the FIFA U-20 World Cup held in Argentina. The stadium hosted all matches of Group D plus the round of 16 and quarter finals (one game each).

| Date | Round | Team 1 | Score | Team 2 |
|---|---|---|---|---|
| 18 Jun | Group D | Angola | 0–0 | Czech Republic |
| 18 Jun | Group D | Japan | 0–2 | Australia |
| 21 Jun | Group D | Australia | 0–3 | Czech Republic |
| 21 Jun | Group D | Japan | 1–2 | Angola |
| 24 Jun | Group D | Angola | 1–1 | Australia |
| 24 Jun | Group D | Czech Republic | 0–3 | Japan |
| 28 Jun | Round of 16 | Netherlands | 2–0 | Angola |
| 1 Jul | Quarter finals | Egypt | 2–1 | Netherlands |

=== 2026 South American Games ===
The stadium hosted nearly all the matches of the men's tournament.

=== 2010 Rugby U20 World Cup ===
| Date | Round | Team 1 | Score | Team 2 |
|---|---|---|---|---|
| 5 Jun | Pool B | France | 25–22 | Ireland |
| 5 Jun | Pool B | Argentina | 22–48 | England |
| 9 Jun | Pool B | England | 36–21 | Ireland |
| 9 Jun | Pool B | France | 25–22 | Ireland |
| 13 Jun | Pool B | Argentina | 23–31 | France |
| 13 Jun | Pool B | Ireland | 21–24 | Argentina |
| 17 Jun | Semifinals | Australia | 28–16 | England |
| 17 Jun | Semifinals | Ireland | 36–7 | South Africa |
| 21 Jun | 3rd. place | England | 22–27 | South Africa |
| 21 Jun | Final | Australia | 17–62 | New Zealand |

=== Other events ===
Estadio Marcelo Bielsa also hosted political party acts, when in 2005 then president of Argentina, Néstor Kirchner, gave a speech as part of the Front for Victory campaign for the legislative election in the country.

In April 2026, Tini Stoessel gave a concert at Marcelo Bielsa Stadium, with an attendance estimated in over 25,000.

| Preceded by various venues in Nigeria | FIFA U-20 World Cup; Venue; 2001 | Succeeded by various venues in United Arab Emirates |
| Preceded by various venues in Japan | World Rugby U-20; Venue; 2010 | Succeeded by various venues in Italy |
