= Nicolás Marcipar =

Argentine professional footballer (born 2008)

Personal information
- Full name: Nicolás Marcipar Idelsohn
- Date of birth: 13 February 2008 (age 18)
- Place of birth: Castelldefels, Spain
- Height: 1.83 m (6 ft 0 in)
- Position: Centre-back

Team information
- Current team: Barcelona B
- Number: 38

Youth career
- 2014–2018: Sant Cugat
- 2018–: Barcelona

Senior career*
Years	Team	Apps	(Gls)
2026–	Barcelona B	0	(0)

International career
2024	Argentina U15	2	(0)
2024–	Argentina U17	3	(0)
- * Club domestic league appearances and goals as of 16:04, 8 October 2024 (UTC)

Nicolás Marcipar Idelsohn (born 13 February 2008) is a professional footballer who plays as a centre-back for Segunda Federación club Barcelona Atlètic. Born in Spain, he represents Argentina at international level.

== Early life ==
Marcipar's parents, Javier and Muriel, were born in Santa Fe, Argentina, and emigrated to Spain in 1999, settling in the Province of Barcelona. Marcipar was born on 13 February 2008, alongside his twin sister, Paula, in Barcelona. Growing up, he supported Argentine Primera División side Unión de Santa Fe, as it was the club his parents supported.

As a child, he also took an interest in chess, standing out at the age of five and participating in local tournaments against players three years his senior.

== Club career ==
At the age of six, Marcipar joined local side Sant Cugat, based in Sant Cugat del Vallès, and spent three years before attracting the attention of La Liga side Barcelona. He attended a three-month trial with the club at their La Masia academy, before being offered a place for the 2018–19 season in March 2018.

== International career ==
Born to Argentine parents, Marcipar is eligible to represent both Spain and Argentina at international level. He was called up to Argentina's under-15 team in July 2022. He was called up to the squad again in 2024, ahead of the 2023 South American U-15 Championship, featuring in two friendly matches in preparation for the tournament.
