= Catalina Arias =

Chilean footballer (born 2007)

Personal information
- Full name: Catalina Ignacia Arias Florido
- Date of birth: 24 May 2007 (age 19)
- Place of birth: Chile
- Position: Defender

Team information
- Current team: Colo-Colo
- Number: 2

Youth career
- Colegio Antilhue
- 2019–2025: Colo-Colo

Senior career*
Years	Team	Apps	(Gls)
2025–	Colo-Colo		

International career^{‡}
2023–2024	Chile U17	3	(0)
2025–	Chile	1	(0)
- * Club domestic league appearances and goals ‡ National team caps and goals as of 7 July 2025

Catalina Ignacia Arias Florido (born 24 May 2007) is a Chilean footballer who plays as a defender for Colo-Colo and the Chile women's national team.

== Club career ==
As a youth player, Arias represented the football team of her high school, Colegio Antilhue, at the same time she played for the Colo-Colo youth ranks. She came to Colo-Colo in 2019, became the team captain of the under-19's and was promoted to the first team in March 2025, signing a three-year professional contract.

== International career ==
A member of the Chile national under-17 team since 2023, Arias represented them in the 2024 South American Championship.

At senior level, Arias made her debut in the 5–0 win against Bolivia on 3 July 2025 in Santiago, Chile.

== Personal life ==
She is the cousin of the footballer Martina Osses Arias, who represented Chile at under-20 level in 2020.

== Honours ==
Colo-Colo

- Primera División (2): 2025, 2026
