= Piero Cari =

Peruvian footballer

Personal information
- Full name: Mart Piero Cari Velarde
- Date of birth: 21 August 2007 (age 19)
- Place of birth: Tacna, Peru
- Height: 1.85 m (6 ft 1 in)
- Position: Midfielder

Team information
- Current team: Alianza Lima
- Number: 51

Youth career
- Virgen de la Natividad
- 2023–2025: Alianza Lima

Senior career*
Years	Team	Apps	(Gls)
2025–	Alianza Lima	14	(1)

International career^{‡}
2024	Peru U17	1	(0)
2025	Peru U18	1	(0)
2025–	Peru	1	(0)
- * Club domestic league appearances and goals as of 20:55, 20 October 2025 (UTC) ‡ National team caps and goals as of 20:55, 20 October 2025 (UTC)

Mart Piero Cari Velarde (born 21 August 2007) is a Peruvian professional footballer who plays as a midfielder for the Peruvian Liga 1 club Alianza Lima and the Peru national team.

== Club career ==
A youth product of Virgen de la Natividad, Cari moved to Alianza Lima's academy in 2023. On 7 January 2025, he signed his first professional contract with Alianza Lima for 3 years. He made his senior and professional debut with Alianza Lima as a substitute in a 3–0 Liga 1 loss to Tarma on 29 March 2025.

== International career ==
Cari was first called up to the Peru national team for a set of 2026 FIFA World Cup qualification matches in September 2025. He debuted with Peru in a 1–0 2026 FIFA World Cup qualification loss to Paraguay on 9 September 2025.
