= América F.C. (Venezuela) =

Venezuelan football club

América
- Full name: América Fútbol Club
- Ground: Estadio Olímpico de la UCV; Caracas, Venezuela
- Capacity: 30,000
- League: Primera División Venezolana

América Fútbol Club (usually called América) was a professional football club. The club has won two "Primera División Venezolana" (First Division of Venezuela's Football) titles in the amateur era. The club was based in Caracas.

== History ==
The team - also called "América FCB" - was created in 1919 by the Salesians of Caracas. His uniform was black and white vertical stripes, with white pants.

In 1921 the Americas won the "First amateur championship" of the first division of Venezuela.

Then the team managed to finish second in the subsequent championship in 1922, winning his second title in 1923.

According to the journalist Eliezer Pérez, in the magazine "El Desafío de la Historia" you can read:

"The initiatives gained greater importance when, starting in 1921, Jesuits and Salesians organized the first interclass soccer tournaments in their schools. In fact, in 1921, the Salesians held a first championship that could be described as semi-official, which was won by the "América club". From that moment on, the first division championships began, which lasted until 1956."

The team in the 1921 championship only played with the Centro Atlético Sport Club three games.

In the first, held on October 2, 1921, the America team won 3-2 with goals from Carlos Maal, Aranguren and J.M. Anzola. But in the second they lost one to zero, managing to win the tournament by beating Centro Atlético (3-2) in the third and last game.

América FCB was mainly made up of students from the catholic Colegio San Francisco de Sales.

In the 1923 championship the América Fútbol Club won its second title, while the runner-up was Centro Atlético.

During these first three seasons of the Caracas footyball competitions, apparently only these two teams played. Possibly, Loyola SC also performed in this third championship, according to a photo of the Loyola team that was published in the magazine "El Desafío de la Historia".

After 1923 the Americas FC did not continue participating in the First Category and later in 1925 the team disappeared.

== Honours ==
- Primera División Venezolana: 2

Winners (2): 1921, 1923
Runner-up (1): 1922
