= Windsor School, Chile =

Private school in Chile

Information
- Established: 1959; 66 years ago
- Website: windsorschool.cl

Windsor School is a private cooperative school founded in 1959, in Valdivia, Chile. Once bilingual, the school however promotes the study of English language with international exchange programs and an English laboratory. The Windsor School has also football, basketball, hockey, volleyball, and rugby teams, and participates in the ELSA games arranged by Southern Chile's English schools.
