= Nicole Carter =

Chilean footballer (born 2008)

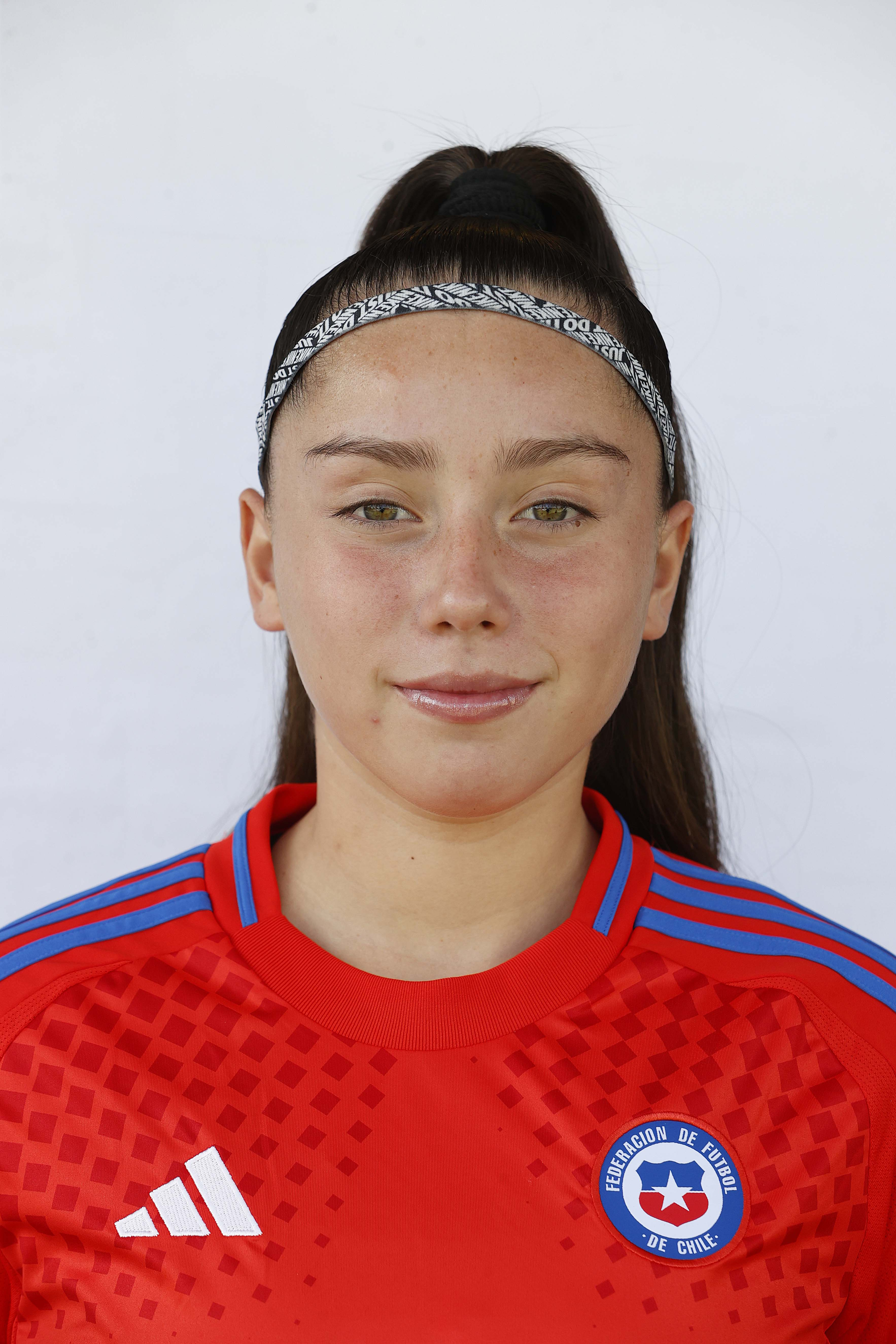
- Carter with Chile U17 in 2025

Personal information
- Full name: Nicole Alejandra Carter Galloso
- Date of birth: 13 August 2008 (age 18)
- Place of birth: Santiago, Chile
- Position: Forward

Team information
- Current team: Colo-Colo
- Number: 22

Youth career
- Club Unión
- Peñalolén (city team)
- Colo-Colo
- 2023–2024: LaLiga Academy

Senior career*
Years	Team	Apps	(Gls)
2023–	Colo-Colo		

International career^{‡}
2022	Chile U15	3	(5)
2024–2025	Chile U17	7	(7)
2024–	Chile U20	2	(2)
2025–	Chile	1	(0)
- * Club domestic league appearances and goals ‡ National team caps and goals as of 26 October 2025

Nicole Alejandra Carter Galloso (born 13 August 2008) is a Chilean footballer who plays as a forward for Colo-Colo and the Chile women's national team.

== Club career ==
Carter started to play football with Club Unión from Peñalolén commune and also represented the commune team before joining Colo-Colo.

Carter was promoted to the Colo-Colo first team in 2023, aged 14, and scored two goals in her senior debut against Cobresal on 26 March. In total, she scored six goals in nine matches during her first season. In September of the same year, she moved to Spain alongside her fellow footballer Yocelin Muñoz after getting a grant to study and play football at LaLiga Academy in Madrid.

== International career ==
Carter represented the Chile national under-17 team in both the 2024 and the 2025 South American Championship.

Carter represented the under-20's in the 2024 South American Championship.

At senior level, Carter was called up to a training microcycle in April 2023. She received her first official call-up to the 2025–26 CONMEBOL Liga de Naciones matches against Venezuela and Bolivia on 24 and 28 October 2025 and made her debut in the first match by replacing María José Urrutia at the minute 74.

== Personal life ==
Her cousin, Alexander Carter, is a musician under the stage name of Young Cart3r and former footballer at the Chilean Tercera División.

As a student, Carter has attended the Instituto IDEA Macul.

== Honours ==
Colo-Colo

- Primera División de Chile (3): 2023, 2025, 2026

Chile U15

- UEFA Under-15 Development Tournament: 2022

Individual

- UEFA Under-15 Development Tournament Top goalscorer: 2022
