= Claudia Martínez =

Paraguayan footballer (born 2008)

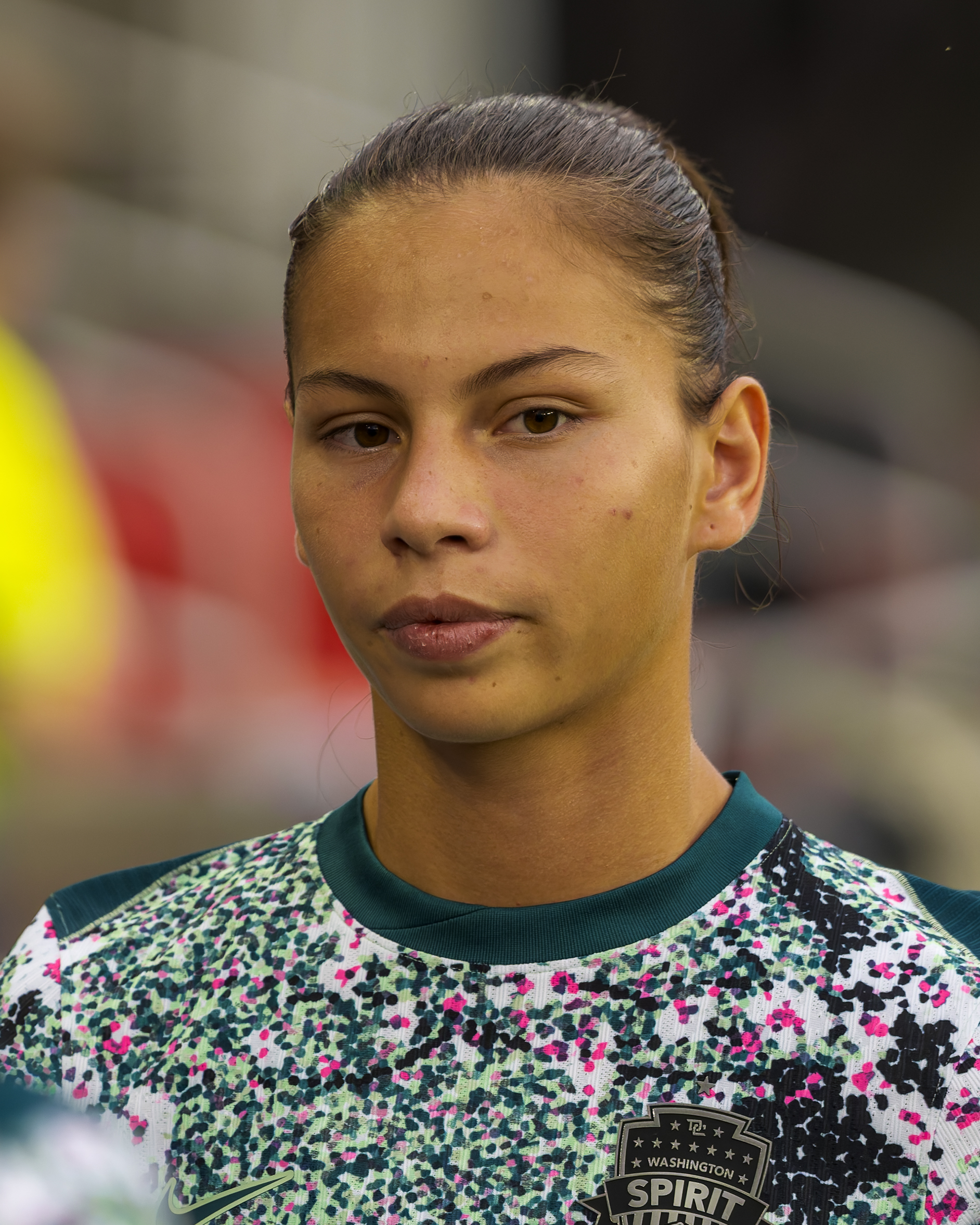
- Martínez with the Washington Spirit in 2026

Personal information
- Full name: Claudia Martínez Ovando
- Date of birth: 15 January 2008 (age 18)
- Place of birth: Capitán Bado, Paraguay
- Height: 1.66 m (5 ft 5 in)
- Position: Forward

Team information
- Current team: Washington Spirit
- Number: 11

Senior career*
Years	Team	Apps	(Gls)
2023–2024	Sportivo Ameliano		
2024–2026	Club Olimpia		
2026–	Washington Spirit	21	(3)

International career^{‡}
2024–	Paraguay U17	19	(24)
2024–	Paraguay U20	7	(6)
2024–	Paraguay	22	(14)
- * Club domestic league appearances and goals as of 05:27, 15 November 2026 (UTC) ‡ National team caps and goals as of 8 June 2026

Claudia Martínez Ovando (born 15 January 2008) is a Paraguayan professional footballer who plays as a forward for National Women's Soccer League (NWSL) club Washington Spirit and the Paraguay national team.

== Club career ==
Martínez began playing football in 2023 with Sportivo Ameliano, where she was described as "a very explosive player who likes to create and occupy space" by former Paraguayan player Claudia Blanco. On 21 January 2024, she signed with Club Olimpia, the most decorated club in the capital, and went on to feature in the 2024 Copa Libertadores Femenina in mid-October 2024. On 12 July 2025, the club announced that her contract had been renewed until 2027.

In January 2026, Martínez was acquired by the Washington Spirit on a transfer from Olimpia and signed a three-year contract with the club option for another year. On April 24th 2026, she scored her first NWSL goal in a 4–0 home win against the Kansas City Current. On 20 May, she scored the only goal against Pachuca in the CONCACAF W Champions Cup semifinals.

== International career ==
Martínez began representing Paraguay at the under-17 level, featuring in the 2024 and 2025 editions of the South American U-17 Women's Championship, and finishing as the top scorer in the latter. In August 2024, she was named in Paraguay's squad for the 2024 FIFA U-20 Women's World Cup in Colombia, where she appeared in all three group stage matches.

In July 2024, Martínez received her first call-up to the senior national team for friendly matches against Chile. She made her senior debut on 12 July 2024, scoring a consolation goal in a 1–4 defeat to the visitors. A year later, she was named in Paraguay's final squad for the 2025 Copa América Femenina, as the youngest player in the team. On 13 July 2025, she made her debut in the competition as a starter and scored a hat-trick against Bolivia, becoming the youngest player to score multiple goals in a single match at the competition over the last three editions. In doing so, she broke the previous record held by Deyna Castellanos.

=== International goals ===
Paraguay score listed first, score column indicates score after each Martínez goal

No.	Date	Location	Opponent	Score	Result	Competition
1	12 July 2024	Estadio Carfrem Ypané, Ypané, Paraguay	Chile	1–4	1–4	Friendly
2	13 July 2025	Estadio Gonzalo Pozo Ripalda, Quito, Ecuador	Bolivia	1–0	4–0	2025 Copa América Femenina
3	13 July 2025	Estadio Gonzalo Pozo Ripalda, Quito, Ecuador	Bolivia	2–0	4–0	2025 Copa América Femenina
4	13 July 2025	Estadio Gonzalo Pozo Ripalda, Quito, Ecuador	Bolivia	3–0	4–0	2025 Copa América Femenina
5	19 July 2025	Estadio Gonzalo Pozo Ripalda, Quito, Ecuador	Colombia	1–1	1–4	2025 Copa América Femenina
6	22 July 2025	Estadio Gonzalo Pozo Ripalda, Quito, Ecuador	Brazil	1–3	1–4	2025 Copa América Femenina
7	25 July 2025	Estadio Gonzalo Pozo Ripalda, Quito, Ecuador	Venezuela	2–1	2–1	2025 Copa América Femenina
8	28 November 2025	Estadio Tigo La Huerta, Asunción, Paraguay	Uruguay	1–0	1–0	2025–26 CONMEBOL Women's Nations League
9	5 June 2026	Estadio Municipal de El Alto, El Alto, Bolivia	Bolivia	1–0	8–0	2025–26 CONMEBOL Women's Nations League
10	5 June 2026	Estadio Municipal de El Alto, El Alto, Bolivia	Bolivia	2–0	8–0	2025–26 CONMEBOL Women's Nations League
11	5 June 2026	Estadio Municipal de El Alto, El Alto, Bolivia	Bolivia	5–0	8–0	2025–26 CONMEBOL Women's Nations League
12	5 June 2026	Estadio Municipal de El Alto, El Alto, Bolivia	Bolivia	7–0	8–0	2025–26 CONMEBOL Women's Nations League

== Honours ==
Paraguay U-17

- South American Under-17 Women's Football Championship: 2025

Individual

- South American U-17 Women's Championship top scorer: 2025
- Copa América Femenina top scorer: 2025
