= 2025 South American U-17 Women's Championship =

9th edition of the South American U-17 Women's Championship

CONMEBOL Sub 17 Femenino 2025
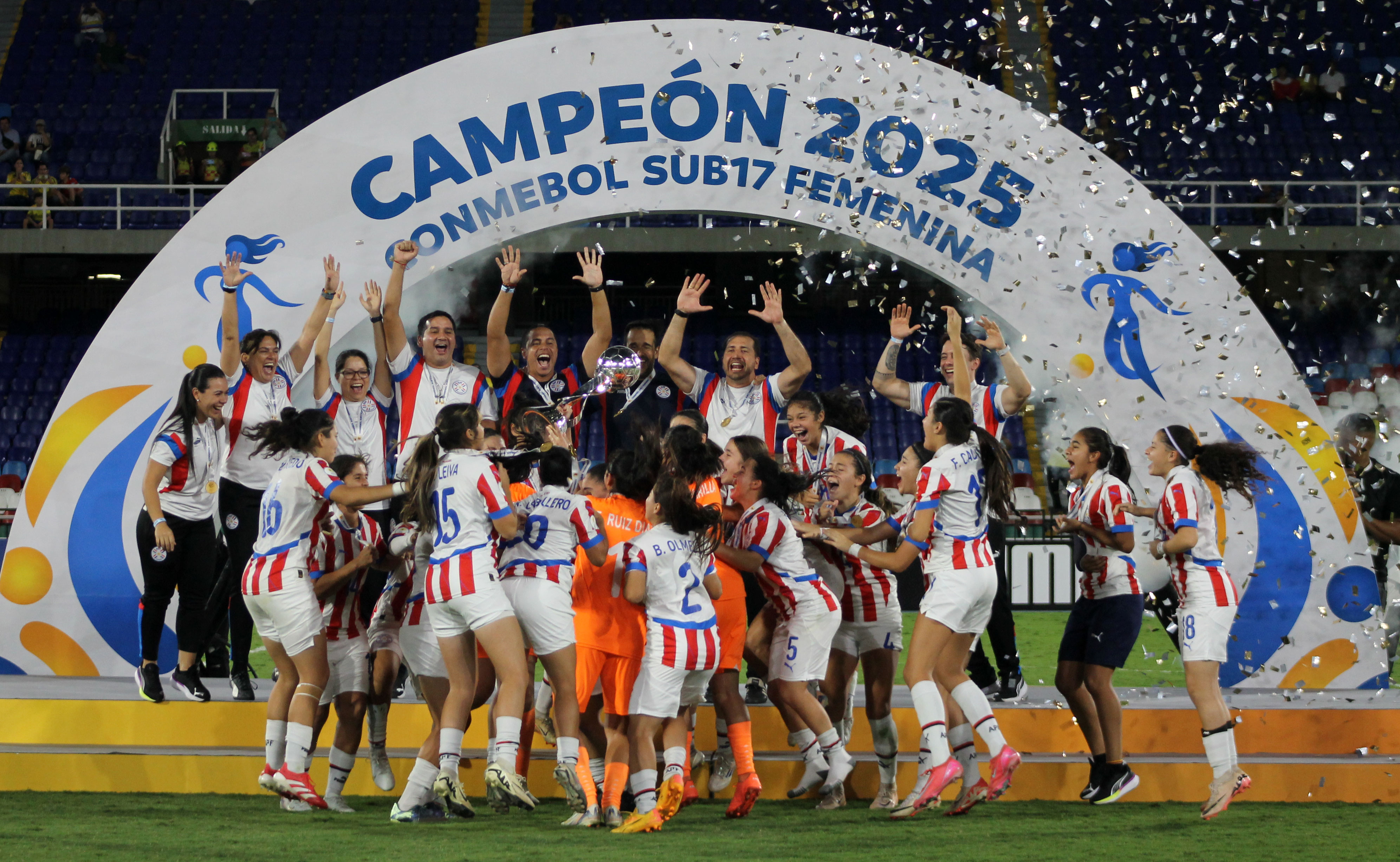

Tournament details
- Host country: Colombia
- Dates: 30 April – 24 May
- Teams: 10 (from 1 confederation)
- Venues: 3 (in 3 host cities)

Final positions
- Champions: Paraguay (1st title)
- Runners-up: Brazil
- Third place: Ecuador
- Fourth place: Colombia

Tournament statistics
- Matches played: 35
- Goals scored: 100 (2.86 per match)
- Top scorer(s): (Paraguay) Claudia Martínez (10 goals)

The 2025 South American U-17 Women's Championship was the 9th edition of the South American U-17 Women's Championship (Spanish: CONMEBOL Sudamericano Femenino Sub-17), the biennial international youth football championship organised by CONMEBOL for the women's under-17 national teams of South America. It was held in Colombia from 30 April to 24 May 2025.

Paraguay won the competition for the first time after topping the final stage. Paraguay along with Brazil, Ecuador, and Colombia qualified for the 2025 FIFA U-17 Women's World Cup in Morocco as the CONMEBOL representatives after ending in the top four of the competition. Brazil were the defending champions.

== Host and venues ==
Location of the host cities of the South American U-17 Women's Championship Colombia 2025.

- 1 Cali
- 2 Palmira
- 3 Manizales

CONMEBOL announced Cali, Palmira and Manizales as host cities on 30 January 2025, with the Estadio Olímpico Pascual Guerrero, Estadio Francisco Rivera Escobar and the Estadio Palogrande being the venues for the matches.

Cali	Palmira	Manizales
Estadio Olímpico Pascual Guerrero	Estadio Francisco Rivera Escobar	Estadio Palogrande
Capacity: 37,899	Capacity: 15,300	Capacity: 31,611

== Teams ==
All ten CONMEBOL member national teams are eligible to enter the tournament.

Team	Appearance	Previous best top-4 performance
Argentina	9th	Fourth place (2008, 2012)
Bolivia	9th	None
Brazil (holders)	9th	Champions (2010, 2012, 2018, 2022, 2024)
Chile	9th	Runners-up (2010)
Colombia (host)	9th	Champions (2008)
Ecuador	9th	Third place (2024)
Paraguay	9th	Third place (2008, 2013, 2016)
Peru	9th	None
Uruguay	9th	Runners-up (2012)
Venezuela	9th	Champions (2013, 2016)

== Draw ==
The draw of the tournament was held on 19 December 2024, 14:15 PYT (UTC−3), at the CONMEBOL headquarters in Luque, Paraguay. The ten teams were drawn into two groups of five. The hosts Colombia and defending champions Brazil were seeded into Group A and Group B respectively and assigned to position 1 in their group, while the remaining teams were placed into four "pairing pots" according to their results in the 2024 South American U-17 Women's Championship (shown in brackets).

Seeded	Pot 1	Pot 2	Pot 3	Pot 4
Colombia (2) (Hosts, assigned to A1); Brazil (1) (Title holders, assigned to B1)	Ecuador (3); Paraguay (4)	Chile (5); Uruguay (6)	Argentina (7); Peru (8)	Venezuela (9); Bolivia (10)

From each pot, the first team drawn was placed into Group A and the second team drawn was placed into Group B. In both groups, teams from pot 1 were allocated in position 2, teams from pot 2 in position 3, teams from pot 3 in position 4 and teams from pot 4 in position 5.

The draw resulted in the following groups:

Group A
Pos	Team
A1	Colombia
A2	Paraguay
A3	Chile
A4	Argentina
A5	Venezuela

Group B
Pos	Team
B1	Brazil
B2	Ecuador
B3	Uruguay
B4	Peru
B5	Bolivia

== Group stage ==
Tiebreakers

In the group stage, teams were ranked according to points earned (3 points for a win, 1 point for a draw, 0 points for a loss). If tied on points, tiebreakers would be applied in the following order (Regulations Article 20):

1. Head-to-head result between tied teams;
  - Points in head-to-head matches among the tied teams;
  - Goal difference in head-to-head matches among the tied teams;
  - Goals scored in head-to-head matches among the tied teams;
2. Goal difference in all group matches;
3. Goals scored in all group matches;
4. Fewest red cards received;
5. Fewest yellow cards received;
6. Drawing of lots.

All match times are local times, COT (UTC−5), as listed by CONMEBOL.

=== Group A ===
Pos	Team	Pld	W	D	L	GF	GA	GD	Pts	Qualification
1	Colombia (H)	4	1	2	1	6	4	+2	5	Final stage
2	Paraguay	4	1	2	1	6	5	+1	5	Final stage
3	Chile	4	1	2	1	6	6	0	5	Final stage
4	Argentina	4	1	2	1	4	5	−1	5	
5	Venezuela	4	1	2	1	4	6	−2	5	

Source: CONMEBOL
Rules for classification: Tiebreakers
(H) Hosts
30 April 2025
16:30

Venezuela	2–2	Chile
Gutiérrez 62'; Chirinos 77'	Report	Carter 31'; Poblete 85'

Estadio Palogrande, Manizales
Referee: Priscila Vázquez (Peru)
30 April 2025
19:00

Colombia	2–2	Argentina
Martínez 86' (pen.); Baldovino 90'	Report	Paz 18'; D. Álvarez 90+3'

Estadio Palogrande, Manizales
Referee: Andreza da Siqueira (Brazil)

2 May 2025
16:30

Argentina	0–2	Paraguay
	Report	Maldonado 7' (o.g.); Martínez 76'

Estadio Palogrande, Manizales
Referee: Nohelia Giacomazzi (Uruguay)
2 May 2025
19:00

Venezuela	0–3	Colombia
	Report	Baldovino 20', 30', 73'

Estadio Palogrande, Manizales
Referee: María Lupera Reto (Ecuador)

4 May 2025
16:30

Paraguay	2–2	Chile
Martínez 87'; González 90+4' (o.g.)	Report	Muñoz 41'; Farías 89'

Estadio Palogrande, Manizales
Referee: Andreza da Siqueira (Brazil)
4 May 2025
19:00

Argentina	0–0	Venezuela
	Report

Estadio Palogrande, Manizales
Referee: Wilma Balderrama (Bolivia)

6 May 2025
16:30

Paraguay	1–2	Venezuela
Martínez 3'	Report	Mejía 72'; Herrera 90+3'

Estadio Palogrande, Manizales
Referee: Priscila Vázquez (Peru)
6 May 2025
19:00

Chile	1–0	Colombia
Crot 9'	Report

Estadio Palogrande, Manizales
Referee: Nohelia Giacomazzi (Uruguay)

9 May 2025
19:00

Colombia	1–1	Paraguay
Ruiz 76'	Report	Bareiro 23'

Estadio Francisco Rivera Escobar, Palmira
Referee: Andreza da Siqueira (Brazil)
9 May 2025
19:00

Chile	1–2	Argentina
Flores Vitta 86'	Report	O. Gómez 23' (pen.); V. Álvarez 70'

Estadio Palogrande, Manizales
Referee: María Lupera Reto (Ecuador)

=== Group B ===
Pos	Team	Pld	W	D	L	GF	GA	GD	Pts	Qualification
1	Brazil	4	4	0	0	13	1	+12	12	Final stage
2	Ecuador	4	3	0	1	14	6	+8	9	Final stage
3	Peru	4	2	0	2	6	7	−1	6	Final stage
4	Uruguay	4	1	0	3	3	5	−2	3	
5	Bolivia	4	0	0	4	1	18	−17	0	

Source: CONMEBOL
Rules for classification: Tiebreakers
1 May 2025
16:30

Bolivia	0–2	Uruguay
	Report	Rijo 2'; Márcora 73'

Estadio Francisco Rivera Escobar, Palmira
Referee: Adriana Álvarez (Argentina)
1 May 2025
19:00

Brazil	2–0	Peru
Gabi Pusch 26'; Huaylupo 71' (o.g.)	Report

Estadio Francisco Rivera Escobar, Palmira
Referee: Danna Victorino (Colombia)

3 May 2025
16:30

Peru	1–3	Ecuador
Briones 74' (o.g.)	Report	Delgado 1'; Valverde 45'; Guerra 90'

Estadio Francisco Rivera Escobar, Palmira
Referee: Gabriela Arce (Paraguay)
3 May 2025
19:00

Bolivia	0–5	Brazil
	Report	Evelin 2', 58', 66'; Maria Santos 56'; Dany Pereira 80'

Estadio Francisco Rivera Escobar, Palmira
Referee: Brenda Cisternas (Chile)

5 May 2025
16:30

Peru	3–1	Bolivia
Rodríguez 1', 19', 47'	Report	Nina 82'

Estadio Francisco Rivera Escobar, Palmira
Referee: Ana Méndez (Venezuela)
5 May 2025
19:00

Ecuador	2–0	Uruguay
Briones 49'; Valverde 58'	Report

Estadio Francisco Rivera Escobar, Palmira
Referee: Danna Victorino (Colombia)

7 May 2025
16:30

Ecuador	8–0	Bolivia
Zambrano 6'; Bajaña 16'; Delgado 29'; Valverde 35'; Guerra 45+1'; Fierro 59'; López 64'; Alcívar 68'	Report

Estadio Francisco Rivera Escobar, Palmira
Referee: Brenda Cisternas (Chile)
7 May 2025
19:00

Uruguay	0–1	Brazil
	Report	Allyne 76'

Estadio Francisco Rivera Escobar, Palmira
Referee: Gabriela Arce (Paraguay)

9 May 2025
16:30

Uruguay	1–2	Peru
Márcora 25'	Report	Cordero 74' (o.g.); García 90+1'

Estadio Palogrande, Manizales
Referee: Adriana Álvarez (Argentina)
9 May 2025
16:30

Brazil	5–1	Ecuador
Maria Santos 7'; Ravenna 15'; Julia Faria 24'; Pepê 75'; Evelin 80' (pen.)	Report	Guerra 24'

Estadio Francisco Rivera Escobar, Palmira
Referee: Ana Méndez (Venezuela)

== Final stage ==
In the final stage, the teams are ranked according to points earned (3 points for a win, 1 point for a draw, 0 points for a loss). If tied on points, tiebreakers are applied in the following order, taking into account only matches in the final stage (Regulations Article 21):

1. Head-to-head result in games between tied teams;
  1. Points in the matches played between the teams in question;
  2. Goal difference in the matches played between the teams in question;
  3. Number of goals scored in the matches played between the teams in question;
2. Goal difference in all group matches;
3. Number of goals scored in all group matches;
4. Fewest red cards received;
5. Fewest yellow cards received
6. Drawing of lots.

All match times are local times, COT (UTC−5), as listed by CONMEBOL.

Pos	Team	Pld	W	D	L	GF	GA	GD	Pts	Qualification
1	Paraguay	5	3	2	0	11	3	+8	11	2025 FIFA U-17 Women's World Cup
2	Brazil	5	2	3	0	8	3	+5	9	2025 FIFA U-17 Women's World Cup
3	Ecuador	5	2	2	1	6	2	+4	8	2025 FIFA U-17 Women's World Cup
4	Colombia (H)	5	2	1	2	4	2	+2	7	2025 FIFA U-17 Women's World Cup
5	Chile	5	1	2	2	6	6	0	5	
6	Peru	5	0	0	5	2	21	−19	0	

Source: CONMEBOL
(H) Hosts
12 May 2025
15:00

Chile	0–2	Ecuador
	Report	Vargas 25'; Briones 90+5'

Estadio Francisco Rivera Escobar, Palmira
Referee: Priscila Vázquez (Peru)
12 May 2025
17:00

Brazil	1–1	Paraguay
Evelin 16'	Report	Bareiro 38'

Estadio Olímpico Pascual Guerrero, Cali
Referee: Adriana Álvarez (Argentina)
12 May 2025
19:30

Colombia	3–0	Peru
Baldovino 20', 46', 85'	Report

Estadio Olímpico Pascual Guerrero, Cali
Referee: Nohelia Giacomazzi (Uruguay)

15 May 2025
15:00

Paraguay	1–1	Chile
Martínez 83'	Report	Carter 37'

Estadio Francisco Rivera Escobar, Palmira
Referee: Andreza da Siqueira (Brazil)
15 May 2025
17:30

Colombia	0–0	Ecuador
	Report

Estadio Francisco Rivera Escobar, Palmira
Referee: Wilma Balderrama (Bolivia)
15 May 2025
19:30

Brazil	4–0	Peru
Gabi Pusch 5'; Gabriela Rolnik 9'; Martha 45+3'; Maria Santos 88'	Report

Estadio Olímpico Pascual Guerrero, Cali
Referee: Danna Victorino (Colombia)

18 May 2025
15:00

Paraguay	7–1	Peru
Aquino 10'; Casco 17'; Martínez 22', 35', 65', 67'; Mussi 51'	Report	Rodríguez 34'

Estadio Francisco Rivera Escobar, Palmira
Referee: Brenda Cisternas (Chile)
18 May 2025
17:00

Chile	0–1	Colombia
	Report	Henao 12'

Estadio Olímpico Pascual Guerrero, Cali
Referee: María Lupera Reto (Ecuador)
18 May 2025
19:30

Ecuador	0–0	Brazil
	Report

Estadio Olímpico Pascual Guerrero, Cali
Referee: Gabriela Arce (Paraguay)

21 May 2025
15:00

Peru	1–4	Ecuador
Salazar 24'	Report	Villacís 45+1'; Valverde 48'; Guerra 53'; López 90+4'

Estadio Francisco Rivera Escobar, Palmira
Referee: Andreza da Siqueira (Brazil)
21 May 2025
17:30

Brazil	2–2	Chile
Gabi Pusch 36'; Ravenna 50'	Report	Muñoz 7'; Correa 26'

Estadio Francisco Rivera Escobar, Palmira
Referee: Ana Méndez (Venezuela)
21 May 2025
19:30

Paraguay	1–0	Colombia
Martínez 69'	Report

Estadio Olímpico Pascual Guerrero, Cali
Referee: Nohelia Giacomazzi (Uruguay)

24 May 2025
15:30

Peru	0–3	Chile
	Report	Carter 36'; Casas-Cordero 58', 66'

Estadio Francisco Rivera Escobar, Palmira
Referee: Danna Victorino (Colombia)
24 May 2025
15:30

Colombia	0–1	Brazil
	Report	Evelin 68'

Estadio Olímpico Pascual Guerrero, Cali
Referee: Brenda Cisternas (Chile)
24 May 2025
18:00

Ecuador	0–1	Paraguay
	Report	Martínez 90+4'

Estadio Olímpico Pascual Guerrero, Cali
Referee: Adriana Álvarez (Argentina)

== Goalscorers ==
There were 100 goals scored in 35 matches, for an average of 2.86 goals per match.

10 goals

- (Paraguay) Claudia Martínez

7 goals

- (Colombia) María Baldovino

6 goals

- (Brazil) Evelin Bonifácio

4 goals

- (Ecuador) Mary Guerra
- (Ecuador) Jaslym Valverde
- (Peru) Aldana Rodríguez

3 goals

- (Brazil) Gabi Pusch
- (Brazil) Maria Santos
- (Chile) Nicole Carter

2 goals

- (Brazil) Ravenna
- (Chile) Antonella Casas-Cordero
- (Chile) Catalina Muñoz
- (Ecuador) Valeria Briones
- (Ecuador) Emily Delgado
- (Ecuador) Erika López
- (Paraguay) Alison Bareiro
- (Uruguay) Agostina Márcora

1 goal

- (Argentina) Dafne Álvarez
- (Argentina) Violeta Álvarez
- (Argentina) Oriana Gómez
- (Argentina) Annika Paz
- (Bolivia) Jaise Nina
- (Brazil) Allyne
- (Brazil) Julia Faria
- (Brazil) Pepê
- (Brazil) Dany Pereira
- (Brazil) Martha
- (Brazil) Gabriela Rolnik
- (Chile) Penélope Correa
- (Chile) Antonia Crot
- (Chile) Amaral Farías
- (Chile) Isidora Flores Vitta
- (Chile) Martina Poblete
- (Colombia) Maura Henao
- (Colombia) Ella Martínez
- (Colombia) Eidy Ruiz
- (Ecuador) Xiomara Alcívar
- (Ecuador) Niurka Bajaña
- (Ecuador) Emily Fierro
- (Ecuador) Emily Vargas
- (Ecuador) Abigail Villacís
- (Ecuador) Maité Zambrano
- (Paraguay) Fiorella Aquino
- (Paraguay) Cynthia Casco
- (Paraguay) Maité Mussi
- (Peru) Mía García
- (Peru) Alejandra Salazar
- (Uruguay) Camila Rijo
- (Venezuela) Melanie Chirinos
- (Venezuela) Marielbis Gutiérrez
- (Venezuela) Ailing Herrera
- (Venezuela) Avril Mejía

1 own goal

- (Argentina) Agustina Maldonado (against Paraguay)
- (Chile) Constanza González (against Paraguay)
- (Ecuador) Valeria Briones (against Peru)
- (Peru) Fátima Huaylupo (against Brazil)
- (Uruguay) Antonella Cordero (against Peru)

== Qualified teams for FIFA U-17 Women's World Cup ==
The following four teams from CONMEBOL qualified for the 2025 FIFA U-17 Women's World Cup in Morocco.

Team	Qualified on	Previous appearances in tournament^{1}
Colombia	18 May 2025	6 (2008, 2012, 2014, 2018, 2022, 2024)
Ecuador	21 May 2025	1 (2024)
Brazil	21 May 2025	7 (2008, 2010, 2012, 2016, 2018, 2022, 2024)
Paraguay	21 May 2025	3 (2008, 2014, 2016)

^{1} Bold indicates champions for that year. Italic indicates hosts for that year.
