= Chile women's national under-17 football team =

National association football team

Chile
- Nickname: La Roja (The Red One)
- Association: Football Federation of Chile (FFCh)
- Confederation: CONMEBOL (South America)
- Head coach: Alex Castro
- FIFA code: CHI
First colours	Second colours

South American Under-17 Women's Football Championship
- Appearances: 8 (first in 2008)
- Best result: Runners-up (2010)

FIFA U-17 World Cup
- Appearances: 3 (first in 2010)
- Best result: Group Stage (2010, 2022, 2026)

Chile women's national under-17 football team represents Chile in international youth football competitions.

== Results and fixtures ==
Legend

Win Draw Lose Fixture

=== 2026 ===
19 October 2026 FIFA U-17 Women's World Cup	Australia	v	Chile

22 October 2026 FIFA U-17 Women's World Cup	Chile	v	Mexico

25 October 2026 FIFA U-17 Women's World Cup	Chile	v	Spain

== Players ==
=== Current squad ===
The following 22 players were called up to the squad for the 2024 South American Championship.

No.	Pos.	Player	Date of birth (age)	Caps	Goals	Club
1	GK	Catalina Gajardo	22 May 2008 (aged 15)			(Football Federation of Chile) Palestino
12	GK	Martina Funck	18 June 2007 (aged 16)			(Football Federation of Chile) Santiago Morning
22	GK	Jazmín Labrín	16 March 2007 (aged 16)			(Football Federation of Chile) Colo-Colo
2	DF	Fernanda Romero	19 July 2007 (aged 16)			(Football Federation of Chile) Colo-Colo
3	DF	Catalina Arias	24 May 2007 (aged 16)			(Football Federation of Chile) Colo-Colo
4	DF	Natsumy Millones	1 January 2007 (aged 17)			(Football Federation of Chile) Coquimbo Unido
5	DF	Antonella Manríquez	18 July 2009 (aged 14)			(Football Federation of Chile) Santiago Wanderers
13	DF	Monserrat Escobar	4 September 2007 (aged 16)			(Football Federation of Chile) Colo-Colo
14	DF	Florencia Gálvez	7 April 2009 (aged 14)			(Football Federation of Chile) Santiago Wanderers
15	DF	Lauryn Morales	6 March 2008 (aged 16)			(Football Federation of Chile) Santiago Morning
6	MF	Anaís Álvarez	4 July 2007 (aged 16)			(Football Federation of Chile) Colo-Colo
8	MF	Yocelin Muñoz	8 May 2007 (aged 16)			(Football Federation of Chile) Rangers
10	MF	Ámbar Figueroa	24 October 2007 (aged 16)			(Football Federation of Chile) Santiago Morning
16	MF	Agustina Riquelme	29 January 2007 (aged 17)			(Football Federation of Chile) Universidad Católica
17	MF	Maite Avello	21 November 2008 (aged 15)			(Football Federation of Chile) Santiago Morning
18	MF	Antonella Casas-Cordero	2 November 2008 (aged 15)			(Football Federation of Chile) Universidad de Chile
20	MF	Alexa San Francisco	4 June 2007 (aged 16)			(Football Federation of Chile) Coquimbo Unido
7	FW	Vaitiare Pardo	20 August 2007 (aged 16)			(Football Federation of Chile) Universidad Católica
9	FW	Pamela Cabezas	10 July 2007 (aged 16)			(Football Federation of Chile) Universidad Católica
11	FW	Geraldine Mardones	20 December 2008 (aged 15)			(Football Federation of Chile) Colo-Colo
19	FW	Nicole Carter	13 August 2008 (aged 15)			(Football Federation of Chile) Colo-Colo
21	FW	Antonella Martínez	14 September 2009 (aged 14)			(Football Federation of Chile) Everton

=== Previous squads ===
- 2010 FIFA U-17 Women's World Cup

== Competitive record ==
=== FIFA U-17 Women's World Cup ===
Year	Round	Pld	W	D	L	GF	GA
(New Zealand) 2008	Did not qualify						
(Trinidad and Tobago) 2010	Group stage	3	0	0	3	1	10
(Azerbaijan) 2012	Did not qualify						
(Costa Rica) 2014	Did not qualify						
(Jordan) 2016	Did not qualify						
(Uruguay) 2018	Did not qualify						
(India) 2022	Group stage	3	1	0	2	4	9
(Dominican Republic) 2024	Did not qualify						
(Morocco) 2025	Did not qualify						
(Morocco) 2026	Group Stage	3	0	1	2	3	7
(Morocco) 2027	To be determined						
(Morocco) 2028	To be determined						
(Morocco) 2029	To be determined						
Total	3/13	9	1	1	7	8	26

=== CONMEBOL Sub 17 Femenina ===
Year	Round	Pld	W	D	L	GF	GA
(Chile) 2008	Group stage	4	1	2	1	6	6
(Brazil) 2010	Runners-up	6	3	2	1	13	11
(Bolivia) 2012	Group stage	4	0	0	4	1	17
(Paraguay) 2013	Fourth place	7	2	1	4	8	10
(Venezuela) 2016	Group stage	4	1	1	2	5	6
(Argentina) 2018	Group stage	4	1	2	1	4	4
(Uruguay) 2022	Third place	7	3	1	3	8	15
(Paraguay) 2024	Group stage	4	2	0	2	11	4
(Colombia) 2025	Final stage	9	2	4	3	12	12
Total	9/9	49	15	13	21	68	85

== See also ==
- Chile women's national football team

== Head-to-head record ==
The following table shows Chile's head-to-head record in the FIFA U-17 Women's World Cup.

Opponent	Pld	W	D	L	GF	GA	GD	Win %
Australia	0	0	0	0	0	0	+0	—
Germany	1	0	0	1	0	6	−6	0.00
Mexico	0	0	0	0	0	0	+0	—
New Zealand	1	1	0	0	3	1	+2	100.00
Nigeria	2	0	0	2	1	7	−6	0.00
North Korea	1	0	0	1	0	3	−3	0.00
Spain	0	0	0	0	0	0	+0	—
Trinidad and Tobago	1	0	0	1	1	2	−1	0.00
Total	6	1	0	5	5	19	−14	16.67
