= Football at the South American Games =

- Organiser(s): ODESUR
- Founded: 1978
- Region: South America
- Teams: 8 (men); 6 (women)
- Related competitions: Bolivarian Games
- Current champions: Paraguay (men); Venezuela (women)
- Most championships: Colombia; 3 titles (men)

Football at the South American Games is the multi-sport event football tournament of the South American Games (also known as "ODESUR Games"). The competition has been played since 1978 and is organized by the Organización Deportiva Suramericana (South American Sport Organization). Only youth teams from South America have participated in it throughout its history.

During the first 2 editions (1978 and 1982) they were known as "Cruz del Sur Games", between 1998 and 2006 the football tournament was not played, instead a futsal tournament was organized.

In the first edition (1978) U-20 teams participated, while in the following ones (1982 and 1986) U-19 teams participated, for the 1990 tournament, the football section was played by U-20 teams preparing to the 1991 South American championship. Three editions of the tournament (1994, 2010 and 2014) were played with U-17 teams, returning to U-20 teams in 2018.

In 2014, a women's tournament was included.

== Eligible participants ==
- Argentina
- Aruba
- Bolivia
- Brazil
- Chile
- Colombia
- Curaçao
- Ecuador
- Guyana
- Panama
- Paraguay
- Peru
- Suriname
- Uruguay
- Venezuela

== Men's tournament ==
=== Summaries ===
- 1978, 1990, 2018–present: U-20 teams
- 1982, 1986: U-19 teams
- 1994, 2010, 2014: U-17 teams

| Ed. | Year | Host | (gold) Gold medal | (silver) Silver medal | (bronze) Bronze medal | Num. teams |
|---|---|---|---|---|---|---|
| 1 | 1978 | La Paz | Paraguay | Ecuador | Bolivia | 3 |
| 2 | 1982 | Rosario | Argentina | Ecuador | Peru | 4 |
| 3 | 1986 | Santiago | Argentina | Colombia | Brazil | 10 |
| 4 | 1990 | Lima | Peru | Ecuador | Colombia | 4 |
| 5 | 1994 | Valencia | Colombia | Venezuela | Peru | 4 |
| – | 1998 | Cuenca | (not held) (Note: Not association football but a futsal tournament organised.) | | | |
| – | 2002 | Brazil (Note: No fixed host but held in Rio de Janeiro, São Paulo, Curitiba, and Belém.) | (not held) | | | |
| – | 2006 | Buenos Aires | (not held) | | | |
| 6 | 2010 | Medellín | Colombia | Ecuador | Bolivia | 6 |
| 7 | 2014 | Santiago | Colombia | Argentina | Ecuador | 6 |
| 8 | 2018 | Cochabamba | Chile | Uruguay | Colombia | 8 |
| 9 | 2022 | Asunción | Paraguay | Ecuador | Colombia | 8 |
| 10 | 2026 | Santa Fe | Paraguay | Argentina | Peru | 8 |

=== Medals ===
| Rank | Country | Gold | Silver | Bronze | Total |
| 1 | Colombia | 3 | 1 | 3 | 7 |
| 2 | Paraguay | 3 | 0 | 0 | 3 |
| 3 | Argentina | 2 | 2 | 0 | 4 |
| 4 | Peru | 1 | 0 | 3 | 4 |
| 5 | Chile | 1 | 0 | 0 | 1 |
| 6 | Ecuador | 0 | 5 | 1 | 6 |
| 7 | Venezuela | 0 | 1 | 0 | 1 |
| 7 | Uruguay | 0 | 1 | 0 | 1 |
| 9 | Bolivia | 0 | 0 | 2 | 2 |
| 10 | Brazil | 0 | 0 | 1 | 1 |

== Women's tournament ==
=== Summaries ===
- 2014: Senior teams
- 2018–present: U-20 teams

| Ed. | Year | Host | (gold) Gold medal | (silver) Silver medal | (bronze) Bronze medal | Num. teams |
|---|---|---|---|---|---|---|
| 1 | 2014 | Santiago | Argentina | Chile | Brazil | 7 |
| 2 | 2018 | Cochabamba | Paraguay | Colombia | Ecuador | 6 |
| 3 | 2022 | Asunción | Venezuela | Uruguay | Colombia | 6 |
| 4 | 2026 | Santa Fe | Venezuela | Chile | Uruguay | 4 |
