= 2023 Tournoi de France squads =

3rd edition of the Tournoi de France

The 2023 Tournoi de France will be the 3rd edition of the Tournoi de France, an international women's football tournament, consisting of a series of friendly games, that will be held in France from 15 to 21 February 2023. The four national teams involved in the tournament registered a squad of 23 players.

The age listed for each player is on 15 February 2023, the first day of the tournament. The numbers of caps and goals listed for each player do not include any matches played after the start of tournament. The club listed is the club for which the player last played a competitive match prior to the tournament. The nationality for each club reflects the national association (not the league) to which the club is affiliated. A flag is included for coaches that are of a different nationality than their own national team.

== Squads ==
=== Denmark ===
Coach: Lars Søndergaard

The final squad was announced on 3 February 2023.

No.	Pos.	Player	Date of birth (age)	Caps	Goals	Club
1	GK	Laura Worsøe	28 October 2001 (aged 21)	1	0	(Denmark) Kolding
2	DF	Sara Thrige	15 May 1996 (aged 26)	26	2	(Italy) Milan
3	DF	Stine Ballisager Pedersen	3 January 1994 (aged 29)	38	3	(Norway) Vålerenga
4	DF	Rikke Sevecke	15 June 1996 (aged 26)	44	4	(England) Everton
5	DF	Simone Boye Sørensen	3 March 1992 (aged 30)	79	5	(Sweden) Hammarby
6	MF	Karen Holmgaard	28 January 1999 (aged 24)	22	3	(England) Everton
7	MF	Sanne Troelsgaard	15 August 1988 (aged 34)	171	55	(England) Reading
8	MF	Emma Snerle	23 March 2001 (aged 21)	24	2	(England) West Ham United
9	FW	Amalie Vangsgaard	29 November 1996 (aged 26)	4	0	(France) Paris Saint-Germain
12	FW	Stine Larsen	24 January 1996 (aged 27)	69	21	(Sweden) Häcken
13	MF	Sofie Junge Pedersen	24 April 1992 (aged 30)	84	7	(Italy) Juventus
14	MF	Nicoline Sørensen	15 August 1997 (aged 25)	44	8	(England) Everton
15	MF	Kathrine Møller Kühl	5 July 2003 (aged 19)	21	1	(England) Arsenal
16	GK	Kathrine Larsen	5 May 1993 (aged 29)	6	0	(Denmark) Brøndby
17	FW	Rikke Madsen	9 August 1997 (aged 25)	21	1	(United States) North Carolina Courage
18	DF	Luna Gevitz	3 March 1994 (aged 28)	19	0	(France) Montpellier
19	MF	Janni Thomsen	16 February 2000 (aged 22)	22	3	(Norway) Vålerenga
20	FW	Signe Bruun	6 April 1998 (aged 24)	29	18	(France) Lyon
21	MF	Sofie Bredgaard	18 January 2002 (aged 21)	6	0	(Sweden) Rosengård
22	GK	Maja Bay Østergaard	28 March 1998 (aged 24)	0	0	(Denmark) Thy-Thisted Q
23	MF	Sofie Svava	11 August 2000 (aged 22)	35	2	(Spain) Real Madrid
24	MF	Josefine Hasbo	20 November 2001 (aged 21)	4	1	(United States) Harvard Crimson
25	MF	Frederikke Thøgersen	24 July 1995 (aged 27)	58	1	(Italy) Inter Milan

=== France ===
Coach: Corinne Diacre

The final squad was announced on 8 February 2023.

No.	Pos.	Player	Date of birth (age)	Caps	Goals	Club
1	GK	Mylène Chavas	7 January 1998 (aged 25)	1	0	(France) Bordeaux
2	MF	Ella Palis	24 March 1999 (aged 23)	16	0	(France) Bordeaux
3	DF	Wendie Renard	20 July 1990 (aged 32)	139	33	(France) Lyon
4	DF	Marion Torrent	17 April 1992 (aged 30)	51	1	(France) Montpellier
5	DF	Julie Thibaud	20 April 1998 (aged 24)	0	0	(France) Bordeaux
6	MF	Sandie Toletti	13 July 1995 (aged 27)	36	2	(Spain) Real Madrid
7	FW	Ouleymata Sarr	8 October 1995 (aged 27)	26	9	(France) Paris FC
8	MF	Grace Geyoro	2 July 1997 (aged 25)	59	13	(France) Paris Saint-Germain
9	FW	Lindsey Thomas	27 April 1995 (aged 27)	3	0	(Italy) Milan
10	MF	Kheira Hamraoui	13 January 1990 (aged 33)	39	3	(France) Paris Saint-Germain
11	FW	Kadidiatou Diani	1 April 1995 (aged 27)	80	22	(France) Paris Saint-Germain
12	FW	Clara Matéo	28 November 1997 (aged 25)	19	4	(France) Paris FC
13	DF	Estelle Cascarino	5 February 1997 (aged 26)	5	1	(England) Manchester United
14	MF	Charlotte Bilbault	5 June 1990 (aged 32)	54	1	(France) Montpellier
15	MF	Kenza Dali	31 July 1991 (aged 31)	49	10	(England) Aston Villa
16	GK	Constance Picaud	5 July 1998 (aged 24)	0	0	(France) Paris Saint-Germain
17	FW	Sandy Baltimore	19 February 2000 (aged 22)	19	3	(France) Paris Saint-Germain
18	MF	Viviane Asseyi	27 November 1993 (aged 29)	58	14	(England) West Ham United
19	FW	Kessya Bussy	19 June 2001 (aged 21)	5	0	(France) Reims
20	FW	Delphine Cascarino	5 February 1997 (aged 26)	51	12	(France) Lyon
21	GK	Pauline Peyraud-Magnin	17 March 1992 (aged 30)	36	0	(Italy) Juventus
22	DF	Ève Périsset	24 December 1994 (aged 28)	44	4	(England) Chelsea
23	DF	Hawa Cissoko	10 April 1997 (aged 25)	7	0	(England) West Ham United
24	GK	Manon Heil	11 March 1997 (aged 25)	0	0	(France) Fleury
25	DF	Maëlle Lakrar	27 May 2000 (aged 22)	0	0	(France) Montpellier
26	FW	Naomie Feller	6 November 2001 (aged 21)	1	0	(Spain) Real Madrid

=== Norway ===
Coach: Hege Riise

The final squad was announced on 6 February 2023.

No.	Pos.	Player	Date of birth (age)	Caps	Goals	Club
1	GK	Guro Pettersen	22 August 1991 (aged 31)	6	0	(Norway) Vålerenga
2	DF	Marit Bratberg Lund	7 November 1997 (aged 25)	2	0	(Norway) Brann
3	DF	Maria Thorisdottir	5 June 1993 (aged 29)	0	0	(England) Manchester United
4	DF	Tuva Hansen	4 August 1997 (aged 25)	23	1	(Germany) Bayern Munich
5	DF	Guro Bergsvand	3 March 1994 (aged 28)	19	4	(England) Brighton & Hove Albion
6	DF	Maren Mjelde	6 November 1989 (aged 33)	160	20	(England) Chelsea
7	MF	Emilie Marie Joramo	13 January 2002 (aged 21)	2	0	(Norway) Rosenborg
8	MF	Vilde Bøe Risa	13 July 1995 (aged 27)	55	2	(England) Manchester United
9	FW	Karina Sævik	24 March 1996 (aged 26)	34	4	(Norway) Vålerenga
10	MF	Thea Bjelde	5 June 2000 (aged 22)	3	0	(Norway) Vålerenga
11	MF	Guro Reiten	26 July 1994 (aged 28)	75	17	(England) Chelsea
12	GK	Sunniva Skoglund	22 May 2002 (aged 20)	1	0	(Norway) Stabæk
13	FW	Celin Bizet Ildhusøy	24 October 2001 (aged 21)	11	5	(England) Tottenham Hotspur
14	DF	Thea Sørbo	28 March 2003 (aged 19)	0	0	(Sweden) Hammarby
15	MF	Amalie Eikeland	26 August 1995 (aged 27)	40	3	(England) Reading
16	DF	Mathilde Hauge Harviken	29 December 2001 (aged 21)	5	0	(Norway) Rosenborg
17	FW	Julie Blakstad	27 August 2001 (aged 21)	24	3	(England) Manchester City
18	MF	Frida Maanum	16 July 1999 (aged 23)	60	9	(England) Arsenal
19	DF	Malin Brenn	13 March 1999 (aged 23)	0	0	(Italy) Como
20	MF	Emilie Haavi	16 June 1992 (aged 30)	94	16	(Italy) Roma
21	FW	Anna Jøsendal	29 April 2001 (aged 21)	6	0	(Norway) Rosenborg
22	DF	Sara Hørte	24 November 2000 (aged 22)	3	1	(Norway) Rosenborg
23	GK	Aurora Mikalsen	21 March 1996 (aged 26)	6	0	(Norway) Brann
24	FW	Emilie Nautnes	13 January 1999 (aged 24)	6	1	(Norway) Rosenborg
25	MF	Emma Stølen Godø	31 May 2000 (aged 22)	0	0	(Norway) LSK Kvinner

=== Uruguay ===
Coach: Ariel Longo

A preliminary squad was announced on 28 January 2023. The final squad was announced on 9 February 2023.

No.	Pos.	Player	Date of birth (age)	Club
1	GK	Josefina Villanueva	3 February 2000 (aged 23)	(Uruguay) Nacional
2	DF	Stephanie Lacoste	9 September 1996 (aged 26)	(Peru) Universitario
3	DF	Daiana Farías	26 January 1999 (aged 24)	(Portugal) Racing Power
4	DF	Carina Felipe	3 March 1998 (aged 24)	(Argentina) River Plate
5	MF	Karol Bermúdez	18 April 2001 (aged 21)	(Brazil) Atlético Mineiro
6	DF	Maytel Costa	11 February 2001 (aged 22)	(Uruguay) Nacional
7	DF	Stephanie Tregartten	13 October 1997 (aged 25)	(Uruguay) Ceibal
8	MF	Ximena Velazco	31 July 1995 (aged 27)	Unattached
9	FW	Belén Aquino	1 February 2002 (aged 21)	(Brazil) Internacional
10	FW	Carolina Birizamberri	9 July 1995 (aged 27)	(Argentina) River Plate
11	FW	Yamila Badell	1 March 1996 (aged 26)	(Spain) Real Oviedo
12	GK	Vanina Sburlati	3 August 2003 (aged 19)	(Uruguay) Peñarol
13	GK	Sofía Olivera	14 August 1991 (aged 31)	(Argentina) UAI Urquiza
14	DF	Antonella Ferradans	2 May 2001 (aged 21)	(Uruguay) Nacional
15	MF	Rocío Martínez	4 September 2001 (aged 21)	(Uruguay) Nacional
16	DF	Yannel Correa	10 September 1996 (aged 26)	(Spain) Real Oviedo
17	MF	Jemina Rolfo	20 February 1995 (aged 27)	(Uruguay) Peñarol
18	MF	Cecilia Gómez	7 September 2001 (aged 21)	(Uruguay) Nacional
19	FW	Sofía Oxandabarat	15 June 1994 (aged 28)	Unattached
20	MF	Luciana Gómez	12 November 2000 (aged 22)	(Brazil) Atlético Mineiro
21	MF	Solange Lemos	27 August 2002 (aged 20)	(Uruguay) Nacional
22	DF	Sofía Ramondegui	26 March 2001 (aged 21)	(Uruguay) Peñarol
23	DF	Camila Baccaro	1 August 1998 (aged 24)	(Hungary) Szombathelyi Haladás

== Player representation ==
=== By club ===
Clubs with 3 or more players represented are listed.

Players	Club
6	(France) Paris Saint-Germain, (Uruguay) Nacional
5	(Norway) Rosenborg, (Norway) Vålerenga
4	(France) Montpellier
3	(England) Chelsea, (England) Everton, (England) Manchester United, (England) West Ham United, (France) Bordeaux, (France) Lyon, (Spain) Real Madrid, (Uruguay) Peñarol

=== By club nationality ===
Players	Clubs
20	England, France
14	Norway
10	Uruguay
7	Italy
5	Spain
4	Sweden
3	Argentina, Brazil, Denmark
2	United States
1	Germany, Hungary, Peru, Portugal

=== By club federation ===
Players	Federation
76	UEFA
17	CONMEBOL
2	CONCACAF

=== By representatives of domestic league ===
National squad	Players
France	17
Norway	12
Uruguay	10
Denmark	3
