= 2022 South American U-17 Women's Championship =

7th edition of the South American U-17 Women's Championship

CONMEBOL Sub 17 Femenino Uruguay 2022

Tournament details
- Host country: Uruguay
- City: Montevideo
- Dates: 1–19 March
- Teams: 10 (from 1 confederation)
- Venue: 1 (in 1 host city)

Final positions
- Champions: Brazil (4th title)
- Runners-up: Colombia
- Third place: Chile
- Fourth place: Paraguay

Tournament statistics
- Matches played: 26
- Goals scored: 90 (3.46 per match)
- Top scorer: (Brazil) Jhonson (9 goals)

The 2022 South American U-17 Women's Championship was the 7th edition of the South American U-17 Women's Championship (Spanish: CONMEBOL Sudamericano Femenino Sub-17), the biennial international youth football championship organised by CONMEBOL for the women's under-17 national teams of South America. It was held in Montevideo, Uruguay from 1 to 19 March 2022.

Initially, the 7th edition of the tournament was scheduled to be held in 2020 but had to be cancelled for that year due to the COVID-19 pandemic.

The top three teams qualified for the 2022 FIFA U-17 Women's World Cup in India as the CONMEBOL representatives. Defending champions Brazil won their fourth title after finish first in the final stage and alongside the runners-up Colombia and third place Chile qualified for the 2022 FIFA U-17 Women's World Cup.

== Teams ==
All ten CONMEBOL member national teams are eligible to enter the tournament.

Team	Appearance	Previous best top-4 performance
Argentina	7th	Fourth place (2008, 2012)
Bolivia	7th	None
Brazil (holders)	7th	Champions (2010, 2012, 2018)
Chile	7th	Runners-up (2010)
Colombia	7th	Champions (2008)
Ecuador	7th	None
Paraguay	7th	Third place (2008, 2013, 2016)
Peru	7th	None
Uruguay (hosts)	7th	Runners-up (2012)
Venezuela	7th	Champions (2013, 2016)

== Venues ==
Montevideo
Estadio Charrúa
Capacity: 14,000
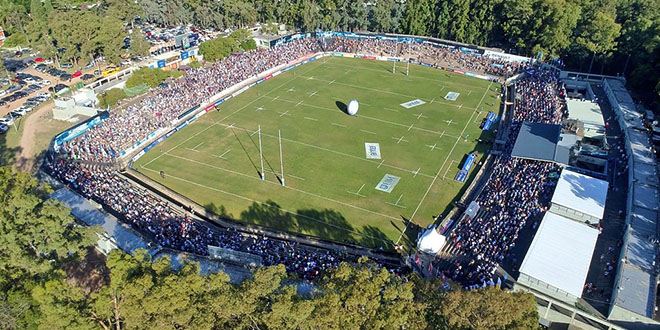

Uruguay was named as host country of the tournament at the CONMEBOL Council meeting held on 27 October 2021. The Estadio Charrúa in Montevideo will host all the matches.

== Draw ==
The draw was held on 11 February 2022, 12:30 PYST (UTC−3), at the CONMEBOL headquarters in Luque, Paraguay. The hosts Uruguay and the title holders Brazil were seeded and assigned to the head of the groups A and B respectively. The remaining eight teams were split into four "pairing pots" (Colombia–Venezuela, Chile-Paraguay, Argentina-Peru, Ecuador-Bolivia) based on the final placement they reached in the last played edition of the tournament (shown in brackets).

Pot 1	Pot 2	Pot 3	Pot 4
Colombia (2); Venezuela (4)	Chile (5); Paraguay (6)	Argentina (7); Peru (8)	Ecuador (9); Bolivia (10)

From each pot, the first team drawn was placed into Group A and the second team drawn was placed into Group B. In both groups, teams from pot 1 were allocated in position 2, teams from pot 2 in position 3, teams from pot 3 in position 4 and teams from pot 4 in position 5.

The draw resulted in the following groups:

Group A
Pos	Team
A1	Uruguay
A2	Colombia
A4	Chile
A3	Peru
A5	Ecuador

Group B
Pos	Team
B1	Brazil
B2	Venezuela
B3	Paraguay
B4	Argentina
B5	Bolivia

== Match officials ==
On 4 February 2022, CONMEBOL informed to its member associations the referees appointed for the tournament.

- (Argentina) Gabriela Coronel
  - Assistants: María Eugenia Rocco and Carla Belén López
- (Bolivia) Alejandra Quisbert
  - Assistants: Maricela Urapuca and Amalia Carrasco
- (Brazil) Andreza Siqueira
  - Assistants: Fernanda Gomes Antunes and Anne Kesy Gomes de Sa
- (Chile) Yomara Salazar
  - Assistants: Leslie Vásquez and Marcia Castillo
- (Colombia) Paula Fernández
  - Assistants: Mayra Sánchez and Iris Alicia Alarcón
- (Ecuador) Verónica Guazhambo
  - Assistants: Joselyn Romero and Stefania Paguay
- (Paraguay) Angelina Rodas
  - Assistants: Nadia Weiler and Rossana Salinas
- (Peru) Gaby Oncoy
  - Assistants: Thyty Rodríguez and Gabriela Moreno
- (Uruguay) Nadia Fuques
  - Assistants: Luciana Mascaraña and Belén Clavijo
- (Venezuela) María Eugenia Herrán
  - Assistants: Laura Cárdenas and Thaity Dugarte

Support Referees

- (Argentina) Antonella Álvarez
- (Uruguay) Silvia Ríos

== Squads ==
Players born between 1 January 2005 and 31 December 2007 are eligible to compete in the tournament. Each team could register a maximum of 22 and a minimum of 18 players, including at least 2 goalkeepers (Regulations Article 26).

== First stage ==
In the first stage, the teams are ranked according to points earned (3 points for a win, 1 point for a draw, 0 points for a loss). If tied on points, tiebreakers are applied in the following order (Regulations Article 20):

1. Head-to-head result in games between tied teams;
  1. Points in the matches played between the teams in question;
  2. Goal difference in the matches played between the teams in question;
  3. Number of goals scored in the matches played between the teams in question;
2. Goal difference in all group matches;
3. Number of goals scored in all group matches;
4. Fewest red cards received;
5. Fewest yellow cards received
6. Drawing of lots.

The top two teams of each group advance to the final stage.

All match times were in UYT (UTC−3), as listed by CONMEBOL.

=== Group A ===
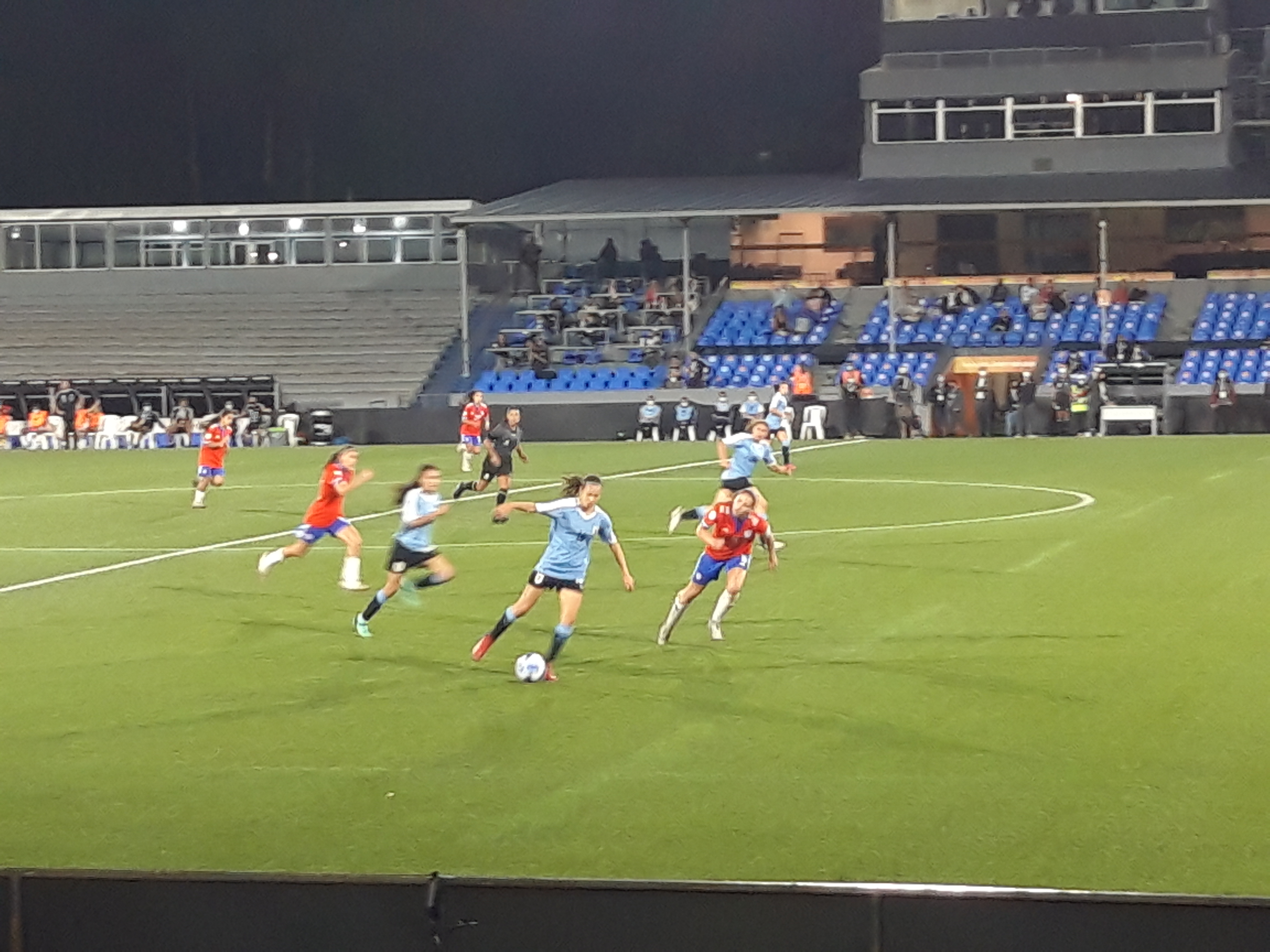
Uruguay vs Chile match

Pos	Team	Pld	W	D	L	GF	GA	GD	Pts	Qualification
1	Colombia	4	4	0	0	15	1	+14	12	Final stage
2	Chile	4	2	1	1	6	4	+2	7	Final stage
3	Ecuador	4	2	0	2	5	7	−2	6	
4	Uruguay (H)	4	1	1	2	4	4	0	4	
5	Peru	4	0	0	4	1	15	−14	0	

Source: CONMEBOL
(H) Hosts
1 March 2022
16:00

Ecuador	0–1	Chile
	Report	González 18'

Estadio Charrúa, Montevideo
Referee: Andreza Siqueira (Brazil)
1 March 2022
18:30

Uruguay	2–0	Peru
Morales 15'; Mazziotto 35'	Report

Estadio Charrúa, Montevideo
Referee: María Eugenia Herrán (Venezuela)

3 March 2022
16:00

Peru	0–7	Colombia
	Report	Caicedo 18', 19'; Muñoz 45+1', 80', 87'; Rodríguez 48'; Quintero 76'

Estadio Charrúa, Montevideo
Referee: Alejandra Quisbert (Bolivia)
3 March 2022
18:30

Ecuador	2–1	Uruguay
Rodríguez 19'; Mayorga 64'	Report	Morales 87'

Estadio Charrúa, Montevideo
Referee: Angelina Rodas (Paraguay)

5 March 2022
18:00

Peru	1–3	Ecuador
Gherson 28'	Report	Cazares 25'; Montalvo 60'; Litardo 90+3'

Estadio Charrúa, Montevideo
Referee: Gabriela Coronel (Argentina)
5 March 2022
20:30

Colombia	3–1	Chile
Caicedo 11'; Torres 21'; Ortegón 35'	Report	Cifuentes 45+1'

Estadio Charrúa, Montevideo
Referee: Andreza Siqueira (Brazil)

7 March 2022
16:00

Colombia	4–0	Ecuador
Escobar 11'; Álvarez 16' (pen.); Torres 39'; Guzmán 90+1'	Report

Estadio Charrúa, Montevideo
Referee: María Eugenia Herrán (Venezuela)
7 March 2022
18:30

Chile	1–1	Uruguay
Millones 68'	Report	Guedes 87'

Estadio Charrúa, Montevideo
Referee: Gabriela Coronel (Argentina)

9 March 2022
16:00

Chile	3–0	Peru
Figueroa 37'; Tapia 81'; Rovner 87'	Report

Estadio Charrúa, Montevideo
Referee: Alejandra Quisbert (Bolivia)
9 March 2022
18:30

Uruguay	0–1	Colombia
	Report	Torres 90+3'

Estadio Charrúa, Montevideo
Referee: Angelina Rodas (Paraguay)

=== Group B ===
Pos	Team	Pld	W	D	L	GF	GA	GD	Pts	Qualification
1	Brazil	4	4	0	0	21	0	+21	12	Final stage
2	Paraguay	4	2	1	1	9	7	+2	7	Final stage
3	Argentina	4	2	1	1	6	4	+2	7	
4	Venezuela	4	1	0	3	2	11	−9	3	
5	Bolivia	4	0	0	4	2	18	−16	0	

Source: CONMEBOL
2 March 2022
16:00

Bolivia	1–5	Paraguay
Pedraza 3'	Report	F. Acosta 31', 45+2'; Fernández 38', 78'; A. Martínez 45'

Estadio Charrúa, Montevideo
Referee: Paula Fernández (Colombia)
2 March 2022
18:30

Brazil	3–0	Argentina
Aline Gomes 21', 52'; Jhonson 27'	Report

Estadio Charrúa, Montevideo
Referee: Nadia Fuques (Uruguay)

4 March 2022
16:00

Argentina	1–0	Venezuela
Cangaro 17'	Report

Estadio Charrúa, Montevideo
Referee: Gaby Oncoy (Peru)
4 March 2022
18:30

Bolivia	0–7	Brazil
	Report	Jhonson 7', 52'; Ana Julia 17'; Lara Dantas 19'; Dudinha 21', 45+1'; Vendito 82'

Estadio Charrúa, Montevideo
Referee: Yomara Salazar (Chile)

6 March 2022
18:00

Argentina	4–0	Bolivia
Núñez 46', 68'; Lombardi 60', 70'	Report

Estadio Charrúa, Montevideo
Referee: Paula Fernández (Colombia)
6 March 2022
20:30

Venezuela	0–3	Paraguay
	Report	F. Acosta 15'; A. Martínez 19' (pen.); Villalba 79' (pen.)

Estadio Charrúa, Montevideo
Referee: Nadia Fuques (Uruguay)

8 March 2022
16:00

Venezuela	2–1	Bolivia
Aguiar 89'; Quintero 90+1'	Report	Soleto 61'

Estadio Charrúa, Montevideo
Referee: Verónica Guazhambo (Ecuador)
8 March 2022
18:30

Paraguay	0–5	Brazil
	Report	Aline Gomes 11'; Ana Julia 28'; Jhonson 32', 41'; Kedima 38'

Estadio Charrúa, Montevideo
Referee: Gaby Oncoy (Peru)

10 March 2022
16:00

Paraguay	1–1	Argentina
F. Acosta 60'	Report	Viola 17'

Estadio Charrúa, Montevideo
Referee: Nadia Fuques (Uruguay)
10 March 2022
18:30

Brazil	6–0	Venezuela
Jhonson 4', 39'; Flavinha 6'; Carol 26' (pen.); Rhaissa 65'; Dudinha 77'	Report

Estadio Charrúa, Montevideo
Referee: Yomara Salazar (Chile)

== Final stage ==
In the final stage, the teams are ranked according to points earned (3 points for a win, 1 point for a draw, 0 points for a loss). If tied on points, tiebreakers are applied in the following order, taking into account only matches in the final stage (Regulations Article 21):

1. Head-to-head result in games between tied teams;
  1. Points in the matches played between the teams in question;
  2. Goal difference in the matches played between the teams in question;
  3. Number of goals scored in the matches played between the teams in question;
2. Goal difference in all group matches;
3. Number of goals scored in all group matches;
4. Fewest red cards received;
5. Fewest yellow cards received
6. Drawing of lots.

All match times are in UYT (UTC−3), as listed by CONMEBOL.

Pos	Team	Pld	W	D	L	GF	GA	GD	Pts	Qualification
1	Brazil (C)	3	3	0	0	12	0	+12	9	2022 FIFA U-17 Women's World Cup
2	Colombia	3	2	0	1	5	1	+4	6	2022 FIFA U-17 Women's World Cup
3	Chile	3	1	0	2	2	11	−9	3	2022 FIFA U-17 Women's World Cup
4	Paraguay	3	0	0	3	0	7	−7	0	

Source: CONMEBOL
(C) Champions
13 March 2022
18:00

Brazil	8–0	Chile
Jhonson 3', 45'; Aline Gomes 5', 85'; Ana Julia 30'; Carol 41'; Dudinha 48'; Rebeca 61'	Report

Estadio Charrúa, Montevideo
Referee: Verónica Guazhambo (Ecuador)
13 March 2022
20:30

Colombia	2–0	Paraguay
Rodríguez 8'; Caicedo 90+3'	Report

Estadio Charrúa, Montevideo
Referee: María Eugenia Herrán (Venezuela)

16 March 2022
16:00

Chile	0–3	Colombia
	Report	Torres 8'; Caicedo 74'; Cabezas 79'

Estadio Charrúa, Montevideo
Referee: Nadia Fuques (Uruguay)
16 March 2022
18:30

Paraguay	0–3	Brazil
	Report	Aline Gomes 11'; Dudinha 52'; Rhaissa 86'

Estadio Charrúa, Montevideo
Referee: Gaby Oncoy (Peru)

19 March 2022
18:00

Paraguay	0–2	Chile
	Report	Tapia 84'; Cubillos 90+2'

Estadio Charrúa, Montevideo
Referee: Gabriela Coronel (Argentina)
19 March 2022
20:30

Colombia	0–1	Brazil
	Report	Rhaissa 76'

Estadio Charrúa, Montevideo
Referee: Alejandra Quisbert (Bolivia)

== Goalscorers ==
There have been 90 goals scored in 26 matches, for an average of 3.46 goals per match.

9 goals

- (Brazil) Jhonson

6 goals

- (Brazil) Aline Gomes

5 goals

- (Brazil) Dudinha
- (Colombia) Linda Caicedo

4 goals

- (Colombia) Karla Torres
- (Paraguay) Fátima Acosta

3 goals

- (Brazil) Ana Julia
- (Brazil) Rhaissa
- (Colombia) Yésica Muñoz

2 goals

- (Argentina) Delfina Lombardi
- (Argentina) Kishi Núñez
- (Brazil) Carol
- (Chile) Maitte Tapia
- (Colombia) Gabriela Rodríguez
- (Paraguay) Fiorella Fernández
- (Paraguay) Adriana Martínez
- (Uruguay) Julieta Morales

1 goal

- (Argentina) Juana Cangaro
- (Argentina) Nazarena Viola
- (Bolivia) Yadhira Pedraza
- (Bolivia) Tatiana Soleto
- (Brazil) Rebeca Costa
- (Brazil) Lara Dantas
- (Brazil) Flavinha
- (Brazil) Kedima Gabrielly
- (Brazil) Natalia Vendito
- (Chile) Anaís Cifuentes
- (Chile) Katerine Cubillos
- (Chile) Emma González
- (Chile) Catalina Figueroa
- (Chile) Natsumy Millones
- (Chile) Tali Rovner
- (Colombia) Mary José Álvarez
- (Colombia) Sintia Cabezas
- (Colombia) Juanita Escobar
- (Colombia) Ana María Guzmán
- (Colombia) Juana Ortegón
- (Colombia) Orianna Quintero
- (Ecuador) Maritxell Cazares
- (Ecuador) Karen Litardo
- (Ecuador) María Mayorga
- (Ecuador) Jael Montalvo
- (Ecuador) Lía Rodríguez
- (Paraguay) Pamela Villalba
- (Peru) Valerie Gherson
- (Uruguay) Ilana Guedes
- (Uruguay) Antonella Mazziotto
- (Venezuela) Efranyely Aguiar
- (Venezuela) Fernanda Quintero

== Qualified teams for FIFA U-17 Women's World Cup ==
The following three teams from CONMEBOL qualify for the 2022 FIFA U-17 Women's World Cup.

Team	Qualified on	Previous appearances in tournament^{1}
Colombia	16 March 2022	4 (2008, 2012, 2014, 2018)
Brazil	16 March 2022	5 (2008, 2010, 2012, 2016, 2018)
Chile	19 March 2022	1 (2010)

^{1} Bold indicates champions for that year. Italic indicates hosts for that year.
