= 2018 South American U-17 Women's Championship =

2018 South American Under-17 Women's Football Championship
CONMEBOL Sudamericano Femenino Sub-17 Argentina 2018

Tournament details
- Host country: Argentina
- City: San Juan
- Dates: 7–25 March
- Teams: 10 (from 1 confederation)
- Venue: 1 (in 1 host city)

Final positions
- Champions: Brazil (3rd title)
- Runners-up: Colombia
- Third place: Uruguay
- Fourth place: Venezuela

Tournament statistics
- Matches played: 26
- Goals scored: 65 (2.5 per match)
- Top scorer: (Colombia) Mairéth Pérez (7 goals)
- Fair play award: Venezuela

The 2018 South American Under-17 Women's Football Championship was the 6th edition of the South American Under-17 Women's Football Championship (Spanish: CONMEBOL Sudamericano Femenino Sub-17), the biennial international youth football championship organised by the CONMEBOL for the women's under-17 national teams of South America. The tournament was held in Argentina between 7–25 March 2018.

The top two teams of the tournament qualified for the 2018 FIFA U-17 Women's World Cup in Uruguay as the CONMEBOL representatives, besides Uruguay who qualified automatically as hosts.

Brazil were crowned champions for the third time. Venezuela were the defending champions, but could only finish fourth.

== Teams ==
All ten CONMEBOL member national teams are eligible to enter the tournament.

Team	Appearance	Previous best top-4 performance
Argentina (hosts)	6th	Fourth place (2008, 2012)
Bolivia	6th	None
Brazil	6th	Champions (2010, 2012)
Chile	6th	Runners-up (2010)
Colombia	6th	Champions (2008)
Ecuador	6th	None
Paraguay	6th	Third place (2008, 2013, 2016)
Peru	6th	None
Uruguay	6th	Runners-up (2012)
Venezuela (holders)	6th	Champions (2013, 2016)

== Venues ==
All matches were played in Estadio San Juan del Bicentenario, San Juan.

== Draw ==
The draw of the tournament was held on 28 February 2018, 12:00 ART (UTC−3), at the Estadio Aldo Cantoni in San Juan. The ten teams were drawn into two groups of five teams. The hosts Argentina and the defending champions Venezuela were seeded into Groups A and B respectively, while the remaining teams were placed into four "pairing pots" according to their results in the 2016 South American Under-17 Women's Football Championship: Brazil–Paraguay, Colombia–Uruguay, Chile–Ecuador, Peru–Bolivia.

== Squads ==
Players born on or after 1 January 2001 are eligible to compete in the tournament. Each team could register a maximum of 22 players (three of whom must be goalkeepers).

== First stage ==
In the first stage, the teams are ranked according to points (3 points for a win, 1 point for a draw, 0 points for a loss). If tied on points, tiebreakers are applied in the following order (Regulations Article 18.1):

1. Goal difference;
2. Goals scored;
3. Head-to-head result in games between tied teams;
4. Drawing of lots.

The top two teams of each group advance to the final stage.

On 11 March 2018, the scheduled Group A match between Argentina and Ecuador was not played as players from several teams showed symptoms for food poisoning. The scheduled Group B matches on 12 March 2018 were also postponed as a result. The matches were rescheduled by CONMEBOL with the first stage ending on 18 March instead of 16 March, and the final stage starting on 21 March instead of 19 March.

All times are local, ART (UTC−3).

=== Group A ===
Pos	Team	Pld	W	D	L	GF	GA	GD	Pts	Qualification
1	Colombia	4	4	0	0	12	1	+11	12	Final stage
2	Brazil	4	3	0	1	6	1	+5	9	Final stage
3	Argentina (H)	4	1	1	2	4	8	−4	4	
4	Peru	4	1	0	3	2	10	−8	3	
5	Ecuador	4	0	1	3	4	8	−4	1	

Source: CONMEBOL
(H) Hosts
7 March 2018
18:00

Brazil	1–0	Ecuador
Emily 36'	Report

Estadio San Juan del Bicentenario, San Juan
Referee: Isley Delgado (Venezuela)
7 March 2018
20:15

Argentina	0–4	Colombia
	Report	Jaime 39'; Pérez 45'; Ruíz 66'; Ramírez 90'

Estadio San Juan del Bicentenario, San Juan
Referee: Gabriela Bandeira (Uruguay)

9 March 2018
18:00

Colombia	4–0	Peru
Pérez 15', 60', 84' (pen.); Robledo 79'	Report

Estadio San Juan del Bicentenario, San Juan
Referee: Helena Cantero (Paraguay)
9 March 2018
20:15

Argentina	0–2	Brazil
	Report	Jheniffer 15'; Emily 45+4'

Estadio San Juan del Bicentenario, San Juan
Referee: Dione Rissios (Chile)

11 March 2018
18:00

Brazil	3–0	Peru
Larissa 39'; Júlia 42'; Layssa 55'	Report

Estadio San Juan del Bicentenario, San Juan
Referee: Adriana Farfán (Bolivia)

14 March 2018
18:00

Ecuador	1–2	Peru
Paladines 34'	Report	Tomayconsa 61'; Calmet 77'

Estadio San Juan del Bicentenario, San Juan
Referee: Dione Rissios (Chile)
14 March 2018
20:15

Brazil	0–1	Colombia
	Report	Ramírez 7'

Estadio San Juan del Bicentenario, San Juan
Referee: Gabriela Bandeira (Uruguay)

16 March 2018
18:00

Colombia	3–1	Ecuador
Pérez 49', 90+1' (pen.), 90+5' (pen.)	Report	Paladines 16'

Estadio San Juan del Bicentenario, San Juan
Referee: Isley Delgado (Venezuela)
16 March 2018
20:15

Peru	0–2	Argentina
	Report	Signarella 45+1', 82'

Estadio San Juan del Bicentenario, San Juan
Referee: Adriana Farfán (Bolivia)

18 March 2018
20:15

Argentina	2–2	Ecuador
Vázquez 55'; Ippolito 90+3'	Report	Campos 20'; Flores 90'

Estadio San Juan del Bicentenario, San Juan
Referee: Helena Cantero (Paraguay)

=== Group B ===
Pos	Team	Pld	W	D	L	GF	GA	GD	Pts	Qualification
1	Uruguay	4	3	1	0	5	1	+4	10	Final stage
2	Venezuela	4	2	2	0	7	1	+6	8	Final stage
3	Chile	4	1	2	1	4	4	0	5	
4	Paraguay	4	1	1	2	7	5	+2	4	
5	Bolivia	4	0	0	4	1	13	−12	0	

Source: CONMEBOL
8 March 2018
18:00

Paraguay	2–2	Chile
Ayala 34'; Arévalos 59'	Report	Keffe 66'; Alarcón 89'

Estadio San Juan del Bicentenario, San Juan
Referee: Débora Cruz (Brazil)
8 March 2018
20:15

Venezuela	0–0	Uruguay
	Report

Estadio San Juan del Bicentenario, San Juan
Referee: Vanessa Ceballos (Colombia)

10 March 2018
18:00

Uruguay	3–1	Bolivia
Gómez 22', 48', 57'	Report	Romero 34'

Estadio San Juan del Bicentenario, San Juan
Referee: Alba Saldarriaga (Ecuador)
10 March 2018
20:15

Venezuela	2–0	Paraguay
Olivieri 10'; Carrasco 68'	Report

Estadio San Juan del Bicentenario, San Juan
Referee: Estela Álvarez (Argentina)

13 March 2018
18:00

Paraguay	5–0	Bolivia
Martínez 18' (pen.), 59'; Almada 34', 47'; Arévalos 85'	Report

Estadio San Juan del Bicentenario, San Juan
Referee: Melany Bermejo (Peru)
13 March 2018
20:15

Venezuela	1–1	Chile
Sandoval 81'	Report	Kadzban 89'

Estadio San Juan del Bicentenario, San Juan
Referee: Débora Cruz (Brazil)

15 March 2018
18:00

Chile	1–0	Bolivia
Kadzban 88'	Report

Estadio San Juan del Bicentenario, San Juan
Referee: Vanessa Ceballos (Colombia)
15 March 2018
20:15

Paraguay	0–1	Uruguay
	Report	Domínguez 73'

Estadio San Juan del Bicentenario, San Juan
Referee: Estela Álvarez (Argentina)

17 March 2018
18:00

Uruguay	1–0	Chile
Gómez 31'	Report

Estadio San Juan del Bicentenario, San Juan
Referee: Alba Saldarriaga (Ecuador)
17 March 2018
20:15

Bolivia	0–4	Venezuela
	Report	Olivieri 15', 36'; Carrasco 42'; Argüelles 84'

Estadio San Juan del Bicentenario, San Juan
Referee: Débora Cruz (Brazil)

== Final stage ==
In the final stage, the teams are ranked according to points (3 points for a win, 1 point for a draw, 0 points for a loss). If tied on points, tiebreakers are applied in the following order, taking into account only matches in the final stage (Regulations Article 18.2):

1. Goal difference;
2. Goals scored;
3. Head-to-head result in games between tied teams;
4. Fair play points (first yellow card: minus 1 point; second yellow card / red card: minus 3 points; direct red card: minus 4 points; yellow card and direct red card: minus 5 points);
5. Drawing of lots.

Pos	Team	Pld	W	D	L	GF	GA	GD	Pts	Qualification
1	Brazil	3	2	0	1	5	2	+3	6	2018 FIFA U-17 Women's World Cup
2	Colombia	3	1	1	1	3	2	+1	4	2018 FIFA U-17 Women's World Cup
3	Uruguay	3	1	1	1	3	4	−1	4	2018 FIFA U-17 Women's World Cup
4	Venezuela	3	1	0	2	2	5	−3	3	

Source: CONMEBOL
21 March 2018
18:00

Colombia	2–0	Venezuela
Ramírez 9', 61'	Report

Estadio San Juan del Bicentenario, San Juan
Referee: Dione Rissios (Chile)
21 March 2018
20:15

Uruguay	2–1	Brazil
Calixto 48' (o.g.); Pizarro 80'	Report	Cavalcante 15'

Estadio San Juan del Bicentenario, San Juan
Referee: Alba Saldarriaga (Ecuador)

23 March 2018
18:00

Uruguay	0–2	Venezuela
	Report	Olivieri 65'; Argüelles 83'

Estadio San Juan del Bicentenario, San Juan
Referee: Adriana Farfán (Bolivia)
23 March 2018
20:15

Colombia	0–1	Brazil
	Report	Jheniffer 60'

Estadio San Juan del Bicentenario, San Juan
Referee: Estela Álvarez (Argentina)

25 March 2018
18:00

Brazil	3–0	Venezuela
Jheniffer 11'; Júlia 30'; Emily 43'	Report

Estadio San Juan del Bicentenario, San Juan
Referee: Dione Rissios (Chile)
25 March 2018
20:15

Colombia	1–1	Uruguay
Orozco 87'	Report	Morales 50' (pen.)

Estadio San Juan del Bicentenario, San Juan
Referee: Helena Cantero (Paraguay)

== Winners ==
2018 South American Under-17 Women's Football Championship

Brazil
Third title

== Qualified teams for FIFA U-17 Women's World Cup ==
The following three teams from CONMEBOL qualified for the 2018 FIFA U-17 Women's World Cup, including Uruguay which qualified as hosts.

Team	Qualified on	Previous appearances in FIFA U-17 Women's World Cup^{1}
Uruguay	10 May 2016	1 (2012)
Brazil	25 March 2018	4 (2008, 2010, 2012, 2016)
Colombia	25 March 2018	3 (2008, 2012, 2014)

^{1} Bold indicates champions for that year. Italic indicates hosts for that year.

== Goalscorers ==
7 goals

- (Colombia) Mairéth Pérez

4 goals

- (Colombia) Natalia Ramírez
- (Uruguay) Ángela Gómez
- (Venezuela) Bárbara Olivieri

3 goals

- (Brazil) Emily
- (Brazil) Jheniffer

2 goals

- (Argentina) Chiara Signarella
- (Brazil) Júlia
- (Chile) Isabelle Kadzban
- (Ecuador) Ana Paladines
- (Paraguay) Cinthia Almada
- (Paraguay) Cinthia Arévalos
- (Paraguay) Graciela Martínez
- (Venezuela) Raiderlin Carrasco
- (Venezuela) Wilmary Argüelles

1 goal

- (Argentina) Dalila Ippolito
- (Argentina) Rocío Vázquez
- (Bolivia) Majhely Romero
- (Brazil) Miriam Cavalcante
- (Brazil) Larissa
- (Brazil) Layssa
- (Chile) Antonia Alarcón
- (Chile) Sonya Keffe
- (Colombia) Lina Jaime
- (Colombia) Laura Orozco
- (Colombia) Gisela Robledo
- (Colombia) Yovela Ruíz
- (Ecuador) Lisa Campos
- (Ecuador) Karen Flores
- (Paraguay) Monserrath Ayala
- (Peru) Kiara Calmet
- (Peru) Milena Tomayconsa
- (Uruguay) Micaela Domínguez
- (Uruguay) Deyna Morales
- (Uruguay) Esperanza Pizarro
- (Venezuela) Bárbara Sandoval

1 own goal

- (Brazil) Gisseli Calixto (playing against Uruguay)
