= Rolfo (disambiguation) =

Rolfo may refer to:

- Rolfo, an Italian manufacturer of truck superstructures
- Béatrice Fresko-Rolfo, a Monegasque politician
- Fridolina Rolfö, a Swedish footballer
- Jemina Rolfo, a Uruguayan footballer
- Roberto Rolfo, a professional motorcycle road racer
