= Nicole Regnier =

Colombian footballer (born 1995)

Nicole Regnier Palacios
Personal information
- Full name: Nicole Regnier Palacios
- Date of birth: 28 February 1995 (age 31)
- Place of birth: Cali, Colombia
- Height: 1.72 m (5 ft 8 in)
- Position: Forward

Youth career
- Colegio Bolívar

Senior career*
Years	Team	Apps	(Gls)
–2013	Atlas CP		
2014–2015	Atlético Madrid Féminas B		
2015–2016	Rayo Vallecano		
2016–2017	América de Cali		
2018	Atlético Junior		
2018	Servette		
2020	La Equidad		

International career^{‡}
2012	Colombia U17	10	(2)
2016	Colombia	1	(0)
- * Club domestic league appearances and goals as of 31 October 2014 ‡ National team caps and goals as of 7 April 2016

Nicole Regnier Palacios (born 28 February 1995) is a Colombian former footballer who played as a forward.

== Career ==
She was a member of the Colombia women's national under-17 football team, playing in the 2012 South American Under-17 Women's Football Championship.

=== Spain ===
She played for Atlético Madrid Féminas B of Segunda División (group 5). She played for Rayo Vallecano in the Primera División.

== Career statistics ==
=== International ===
==== International appearances ====
===== Under-20 =====
Team	Year	Apps	Goals
Colombia U17	2012	10	2
Total		10	2

==== International goals ====
===== Under-20 =====
International goals
No.	Date	Venue	Opponent	Score	Result	Competition
1	2012-03-09	Estadio Ramón Tahuichi Aguilera, Santa Cruz de la Sierra, Bolivia	Venezuela	2–1	2–1	2012 South American Under-17 Women's Football Championship
2	2012-03-11	Estadio Gilberto Parada, Montero, Bolivia	Paraguay	0–1	0–3	2012 South American Under-17 Women's Football Championship
