= UTSA Roadrunners =

University of Texas at San Antonio athletics

- University: University of Texas at San Antonio
- NCAA: Division I (FBS)
- Conference: American Conference
- Athletic director: Lisa Campos
- Location: San Antonio, Texas
- Varsity teams: 17
- Football stadium: Alamodome
- Basketball arena: Convocation Center
- Baseball stadium: Roadrunner Field
- Nickname: Roadrunners
- Colors: Navy blue, orange, and white
- Mascot: Rowdy
- Fight song: Go Roadrunners, Go!
- Website: goutsa.com

The UTSA Roadrunners is a collegiate athletic program that represents the University of Texas at San Antonio (UTSA). The UTSA Roadrunners are also commonly referred to as "UTSA", "Roadrunners", or "Runners", and are represented by the mascot Rowdy. The origin of Rowdy dates back to 1977, when the Roadrunner was chosen as the university's mascot by student election.

The Roadrunners compete in the NCAA Division I American Conference in 17 varsity sports. UTSA is San Antonio's only institution that competes in Division I FBS. UTSA joined the Western Athletic Conference on July 1, 2012. In April 2012, it was announced that UTSA would join Conference USA on July 1, 2013. Eight years later on October 21, 2021, it was announced that UTSA would join the American Athletic Conference, since renamed the American Conference, on July 1, 2023.

The UTSA Cheer team has garnered two National Cheerleading Associations’ (NCA) collegiate national championships, first in 2012 and again in 2021. The cheer team has also secured a pair of top 5 finishes in 2019.

== Sports sponsored ==
American logo in UTSA's colors

Men's sports	Women's sports
Baseball	Basketball
Basketball	Cross country
Cross country	Golf
Football	Soccer
Golf	Softball
Tennis	Tennis
Track & field^{†}	Track & field^{†}
	Volleyball
† – Track and field includes both indoor and outdoor

=== Football ===
In December 2008, UTSA announced the planned expansion of the athletics program centered on a new football program. The team's first head coach was former Miami Hurricanes head coach Larry Coker. UTSA began practicing in August 2010 and began competing as an NCAA Division I FCS independent on September 3, 2011. On November 11, 2010, UTSA accepted an invitation for membership within the Western Athletic Conference in the Football Bowl Subdivision. UTSA is now a member of the American Conference (American), joining that league in 2023 after 10 years in Conference USA (CUSA). The Roadrunners won the CUSA championship in their last two seasons in that conference, winning the conference championship game over Western Kentucky in 2021 and North Texas in 2022. The team plays its home games at the Alamodome in Downtown San Antonio.

=== Basketball ===
==== Men's basketball ====
UTSA men's basketball began as an Independent in 1981 before joining the Trans America Athletic Conference, now known as the Atlantic Sun Conference, in 1986. March 12, 1988, UTSA defeated Georgia Southern 76–69 in overtime sending the Roadrunners to their first NCAA post season appearance. UTSA men's basketball has won 3 regular season championships, 4 conference tournaments, and has had 4 NCAA tournament appearances.

UTSA appeared in the CollegeInsider.com Tournament (CIT) post season play in 2018. In 2019 the Roadrunners were invited to the CIT again but turned down post season play.

==== Women's basketball ====
The Roadrunners won their first ever Southland Conference Championship in 2008 defeating Lamar 65–56 at the Merrell Center. This also marked the UTSA women's basketball team's first NCAA Tournament berth in school history.

UTSA earned an NCAA Tournament berth for a second consecutive season with a 74–63 win over top seed UT Arlington in the State Farm Southland Conference Tournament Championship Game on Saturday, March 14, 2009, at the Merrell Center.

The UTSA women's basketball team has earned 2 NCAA Tournament Appearances, 2 conference championships, 1 regular season title, and the 2011 Southland West Division Championship.

=== Baseball ===
The UTSA baseball team was formed in 1992 where they initially competed in the Southland Conference. Built in 1993, UTSA plays at Roadrunner Field which is commonly known as "The Bird Bath." The Roadrunners have won 5 conference tournaments and have 3 NCAA post season appearances.

=== Softball ===
The UTSA softball team plays their home games at Roadrunner Field and initially competed in the Southland Conference since 1992. UTSA shattered its own NCAA record in 2007, hitting 105 round-trippers in 51 contests for a 2.06 average, eclipsing the 1.87 mark set in 2004 (101/54). The Roadrunners own three of the top six home run seasons in NCAA history 105 (2006), 103 (2005), 101 (2004) and set a conference record with 14 home runs in four games at the 2006 SLC Tournament.

The Roadrunner softball team has 2 NCAA Tournament Appearances (2004, 2006), 3 Regular Season Southland Conference Titles (2004, 2005, 2006), and 2 Southland Conference Tournament Championships (2004, 2006).

=== Volleyball ===
The Roadrunners volleyball team host their home games in the Convocation Center which has been dubbed "The Historic Convo" or "Convo" for short. The women's volleyball team began NCAA play in 1983 as an independent. In 1991 UTSA started play in the Southland Conference. In 2010 the Roadrunners won their second-ever Southland Conference Tournament Championship in program history and head to the 2010 NCAA Tournament. In 2012 the team played a single season in the Western athletics conference, the following year transitioned to conference USA. In 2014 the Roadrunners sweep Tulsa to win the Conference USA Regular Season Championship in 2013. UTSA clinched their third NCAA Tournament berth in program history in 2013 by claiming the Conference USA Tournament Championship in four sets against Tulane (25–20, 25–16, 18–25, 25–23). In 2014 the Roadrunners captured the Conference USA Regular Season Championship with a sweep of Rice (25–19, 25–21, 25–22). The volleyball team has 3 NCAA Tournament Appearances (2000, 2010, 2013), 3 Conference Tournament Championships (2000, 2010, 2013), and 5 Regular Season Championship Titles(1999, 2010, 2013, 2014).

== I-35 Orange vs. Maroon rivalry ==
The I-35 Rivalry Orange vs. Maroon Rivalry series is the name given to the athletic competitions between the Roadrunners and the Texas State Bobcats. The name is derived from the Interstate highway that essentially links the two schools, which are in relatively close proximity to each other. In the beginning of the rivalry, a trophy was awarded to the winner of the men's basketball game. It has grown, however, to include all common sports the two schools compete with each other in throughout the academic year. A point system is used to crown a winner after the last competition between the schools in that year. The trophy is then inscribed with the annual winners and the winning institution retains the trophy for one year until the next winner is crowned.

== Athletic achievements ==
=== Basketball ===
==== Men's ====
- The men's basketball team has qualified for the NCAA tournament four times: 1988, 1999, 2004, and 2011.
- The men's basketball team won their first conference championship on March 12, 1988, in a 76–69 overtime defeat of Georgia Southern.
- The men's basketball team won the 1990-91 Trans America Athletic Regular Season Conference Title.
- The men's basketball team won the 1991-92 Southland Conference regular season Title.
- The men's basketball team won the Southland Conference Championship in 1999.
- The men's basketball team won the Southland Conference regular season Title with 106–86 win over Southeastern Louisiana.
- The men's basketball team won the Southland Conference Championship in 2004 defeating the Stephen F. Austin Lumberjacks 74–70.
- The men's basketball team won the Southland Conference Championship in 2011 defeating McNeese State 75–72.
- The men's basketball team won their first NCAA tournament game in 2011 beating Alabama State, 70–61.

==== Women's ====
- The women's basketball team qualified for the 2008 Women's NCAA tournament and 2009 Women's NCAA tournament.
- The women's basketball team wins the regular season Southland Conference (SLC) championship in 2002–03.
- The women's basketball team wins first-ever Southland Conference Championship in 2008.
- The women's basketball team wins Southland Conference regular season Title in 2009.
- The women's basketball team wins Southland Conference Championship in 2009.
- The women's basketball team clinches the 2011 Southland Conference West Division Championship.

=== Baseball ===
- The baseball team won the Southland Conference tournament in 1994
- The baseball team won the Southland Conference tournament in 2005
- The baseball team won the Southland Conference tournament in 2007
- The baseball team won the Southland Conference tournament in 2008
- The baseball team won the Western Athletic Conference Tournament in 2013.* The baseball team won the 2025 American Athletic Conference championship and attained its highest finish in the NCAA Championship by appearing in the NCAA Super Regionals after downing No. 2 NCAA seed Texas in the NCAA Austin Regional.

=== Cross country/track and field (indoor/outdoor) ===
- The men's Track and Field team won the 1996 cross-country championships.
- The women's Track and Field team won the 1996 cross-country championships.
- The men's Track and Field team won the 1997 cross-country championships.
- The women's Track and Field team won the 1997 cross-country championships.
- UTSA wins their 6th consecutive Men's Southland Conference Indoor Track and Field Championship in 2011.
- The men's Track and Field won the Conference USA Outdoor Championship back to back years in 2014 and 2015.
- The women's Cross Country team won the 2013 Conference USA Championship.

=== Football ===
- UTSA set the record for the highest-attended game for an NCAA Division I inaugural game with 56,743 fans in attendance
- UTSA Football makes inaugural bowl game appearance in 2016 season.
- UTSA Football team beat Baylor for their first win over a Power 5 opponent.
- UTSA Football team became bowl eligible for the second straight season in a row.
- UTSA Football program received votes in the Associated Press Top 25 Poll for the first time.
- In the 2020 season UTSA accepted a bid to their second bowl game ever at the Frisco Bowl but it was cancelled due to issues within the SMU program. Days later the Roadrunners accepted their third bowl bid and played in their second bowl game in program history at the First Responders Bowl against #19 Louisiana-Lafayette.
- The UTSA Football program earned its first shut out in their 2021 home opener, beating Lamar University 54–0.
- The UTSA Football program earned its first top 25 rankings in week 8 of the 2021 season. The rankings included ESPN's Power Rankings (#24), USA Today Sports AFCA Coach's Poll (#25), and in the Associated Press top 25 (#24)
- UTSA made its debut in the College Football Playoff Rankings on November 9 of the 2021 season.
- UTSA became the 2021 C-USA West Division Champions, beating UAB 34–31.
- UTSA Football won their first Conference USA Championship in 2021, defeating WKU 49–41.
- Roadrunners won the C-USA 2022 regular season title with 41–7 win over Rice.
- UTSA wins back-to-back C-USA Championship titles with win over North Texas.

=== Golf ===
==== Women's ====
- The women's golf team won the 2011 Southland Conference Championship.
- The women's golf team won the 2012 Southland Conference Championship.
- The women's golf team won the 2018 Conference USA Championship.
- The women's golf team won the 2019 Conference USA Championship.

=== Soccer ===
- The women's soccer team won the 2010 Southland Conference Championship
- The women's soccer team won the 2022 CUSA Championship.
- The women's soccer team also won the 2025 American Conference tournament.

=== Softball ===
- The softball team won their first Southland Conference tournament in 2004.
- The softball team makes their first appearance in the NCAA Tournament in 2004.
- The softball team wins their 2005 Southland Conference Tournament Regular Season Championship.
- The softball team wins their third consecutive Southland Conference Tournament Regular Season Championship.
- The UTSA softball team beats UTA, 8–3, for the SLC Tournament Championship title in 2006.
- The UTSA softball team earns 2nd NCAA Tournament berth.

=== Volleyball ===
- The women's volleyball team won the 2010 Southland Conference Championship and make appearance in the 2010 NCAA tournament.
- The women's volleyball team won the 2013 Regular Season Championship Title.
- The women's volleyball team won the 2013 Conference USA Championship.
- The women's volleyball team won the 2014 Regular Season Championship Title.

=== Commissioners cups ===
- UTSA wins the Southland Conference 2007–2008 Commissioners Cup.
- UTSA wins the Southland Conference 2010–2011 Commissioners Cup
- UTSA wins the Western Athletic Conference (WAC) Commissioners Cup in 2013.

== Final Four host site ==
- UTSA hosted the NCAA Men's Final Four at the now multi-purpose stadium, the Alamodome, in 1998, 2004, 2008, and 2018.
- UTSA hosted the NCAA Women's Final Four in 2002, 2010, and 2021.
- UTSA hosted the NCAA Division I Women's Volleyball Championship in 2005 and 2011

NCAA Men's Final Four	NCAA Women's Final Four	NCAA Division I women's volleyball tournament/Final Four
1998	2002	2005
2004	2010	2011
2008	2021	–
2018	–	–
