= Convocation Center (University of Texas at San Antonio) =

Arena in San Antonio, Texas, US

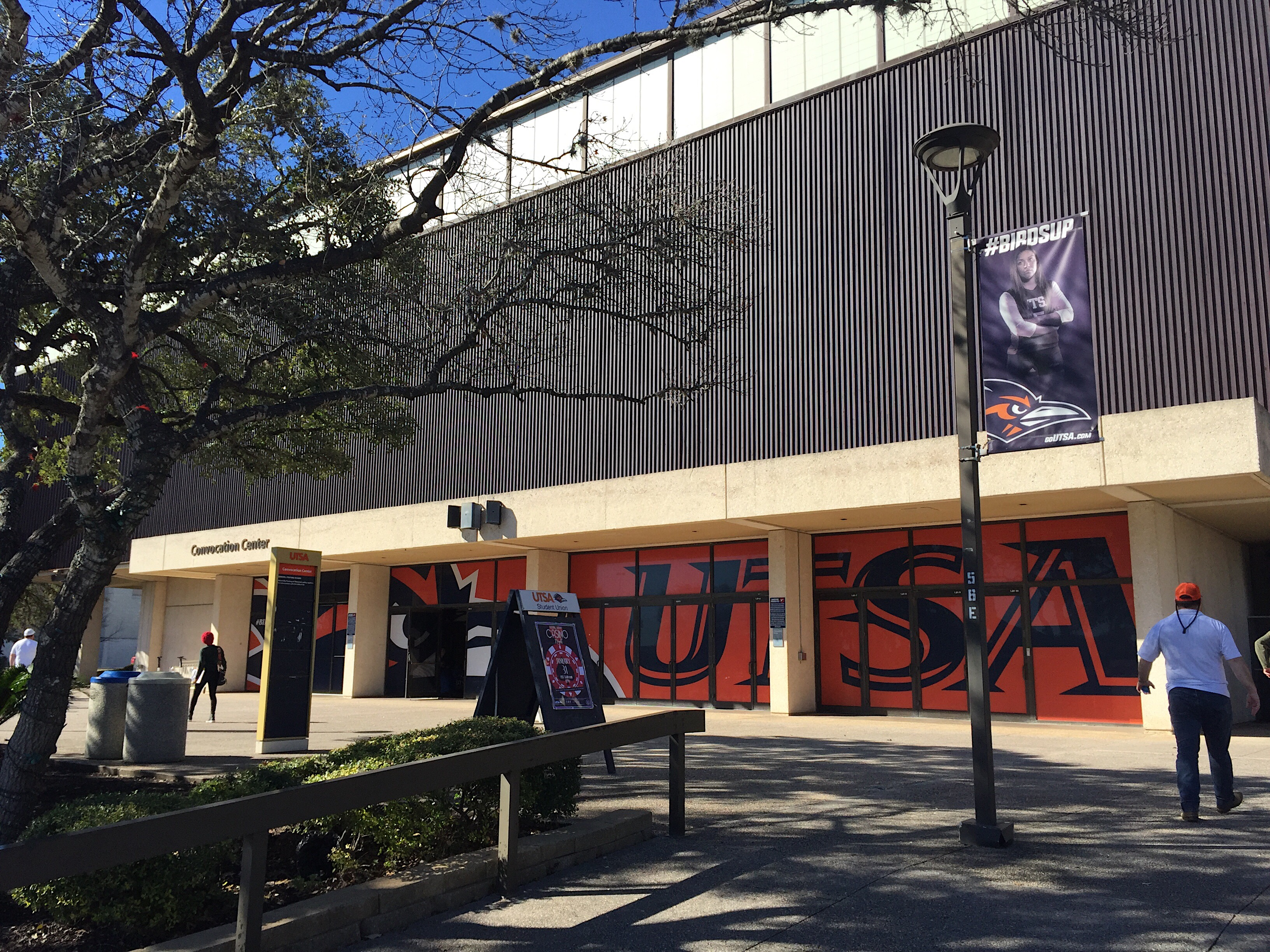
- Interactive map of Convocation Center
- Location: One UTSA Circle; San Antonio, TX 78249
- Coordinates: 29°34′56″N 98°37′17″W
- Owner: University of Texas at San Antonio
- Operator: University of Texas at San Antonio
- Capacity: 4,080
- Surface: Hardwood

Construction
- Opened: 1975

Tenant
- UTSA Roadrunners

The Convocation Center is a 4,080-seat multi-purpose arena in San Antonio, Texas, United States, located on the main campus of the University of Texas at San Antonio (UTSA). It was built in 1975 and is home to the UTSA Roadrunners men's and women's basketball team and women's volleyball teams . It hosted the Southland Conference men's basketball tournament in 1992 and 2004. It has hosted many concerts, with acts like Bad Company, AC/DC and Black Sabbath.

The Convocation Center is often called "The Convo" among the students and athletes of the university. It is also known as the "Historic Convo" and "Bird Cage" to both students and alumni.

== See also ==
- List of NCAA Division I basketball arenas
