= Carina Felipe =

Uruguayan footballer (born 1998)

Laura Felipe
Personal information
- Full name: Carina Felipe Silva
- Date of birth: 3 March 1998 (age 28)
- Place of birth: Montevideo, Uruguay
- Height: 1.60 m (5 ft 3 in)
- Positions: Right back; right midfielder

Youth career
- 2014–2017: Nacional

Senior career*
Years	Team	Apps	(Gls)
2014–2020	Nacional	36	(3)
2020	Boca Juniors	0	(0)
2020	Nacional		
2020–2024	River Plate		
2024	UNAM	17	(1)

International career^{‡}
2012	Uruguay U17	3+	(1)
2014–	Uruguay	5	(0)
- * Club domestic league appearances and goals as of 8 December 2020 ‡ National team caps and goals as of 10 April 2018

Carina "Laura" Felipe Silva (born 3 March 1998) is a Uruguayan footballer who plays as a right back for Liga MX Femenil club UNAM and the Uruguay women's national team.

== International career ==
Felipe represented Uruguay at the 2012 South American U-17 Women's Championship and the 2012 FIFA U-17 Women's World Cup. She made her senior debut on 11 September 2014. She played in two Copa América Femenina editions (2014 and 2018).
