= Milena Tomayconsa =

Peruvian footballer (born 2001)

Personal information
- Full name: Milena Patricia Tomayconsa Paricanazas
- Date of birth: 28 September 2001 (age 25)
- Height: 1.62 m (5 ft 4 in)
- Position: Midfielder

Team information
- Current team: Municipalidad de Majes
- Number: 18

Senior career*
Years	Team	Apps	(Gls)
- Unión Arequipa
- Municipalidad de Majes

International career^{‡}
2016–2018	Peru U17	1+	(1)
2018	Peru	3	(0)
- * Club domestic league appearances and goals ‡ National team caps and goals as of 12 April 2018

Milena Patricia Tomayconsa Paricanazas (born 28 September 2001) is a Peruvian footballer who plays as a midfielder for Club Universitario de Deportes. She was a member of the Peru women's national team.

== International career ==
Tomayconsa represented Peru at two South American U-17 Women's Championship editions (2016 and 2018). At senior level, she played the 2018 Copa América Femenina.
