= Ivana Mendoza =

Paraguayan footballer (born 1995)

Personal information
- Full name: Ivana Elizabeth Mendoza Álvarez
- Date of birth: 19 May 1995 (age 31)
- Position: Midfielder

Team information
- Current team: Sol de América

Senior career*
Years	Team	Apps	(Gls)
2019–	Sol de América		

International career^{‡}
2012	Paraguay U17	2+	(2)
2019–	Paraguay	1	(0)
- * Club domestic league appearances and goals ‡ National team caps and goals as of 3 August 2019

Ivana Elizabeth Mendoza Álvarez (born 19 May 1995) is a Paraguayan footballer who plays as a midfielder for Club Sol de América and the Paraguay women's national team.

In February 2006, Mendoza debuted for UAA in the Campeonato Paraguayo de Fútbol Femenino at the age of 11, tying Gloria Villamayor for the feat. She has also played for the Paraguay women's under-17 team.

== International career ==
Mendoza represented Paraguay at the 2012 South American U-17 Women's Championship. She made her senior debut on 31 July 2019 against Mexico in the 2019 Pan American Games.
