= Micaela Cabrera =

Argentine footballer (born 1997)

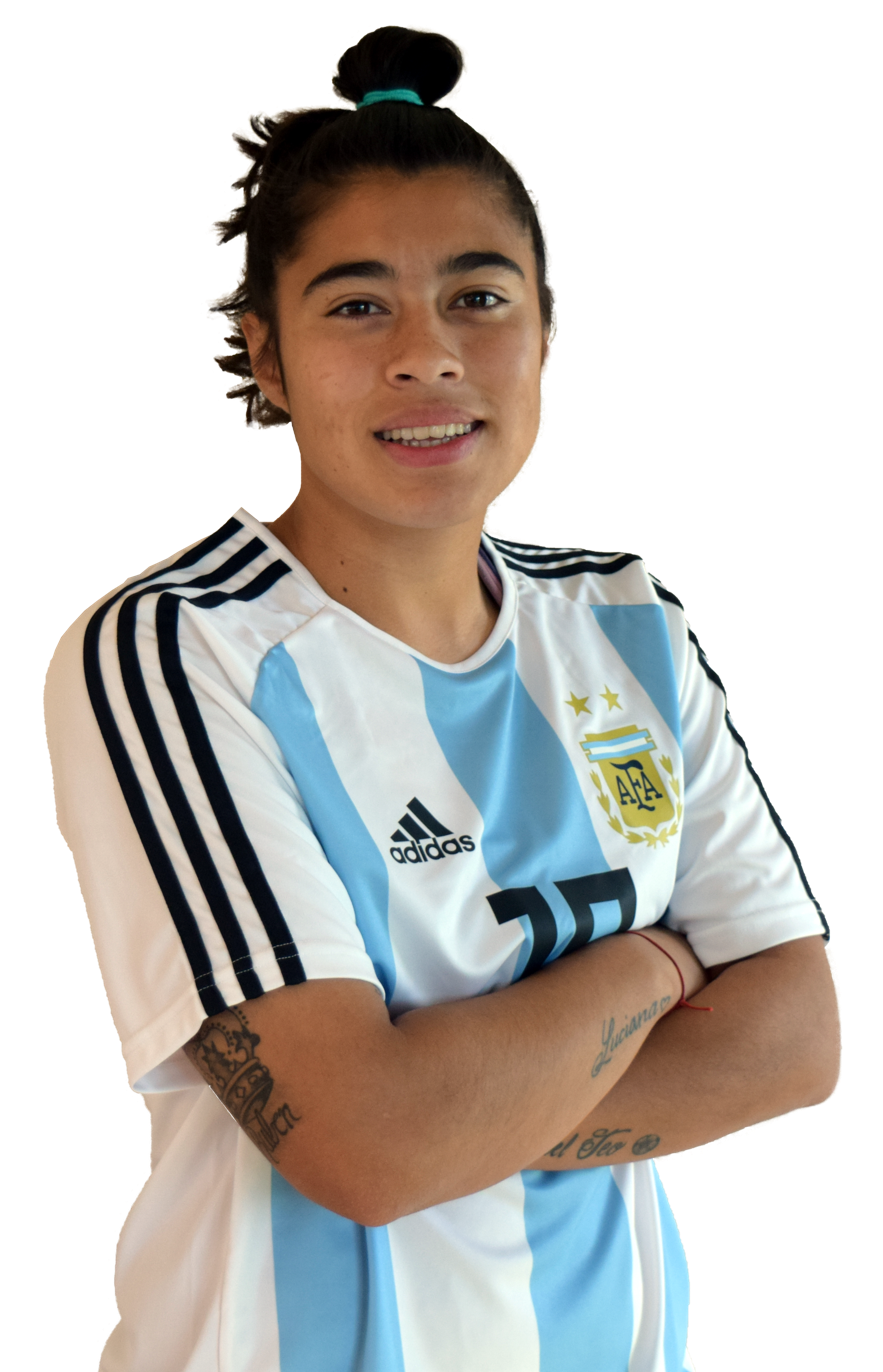

Personal information
- Full name: Erika Micaela Cabrera
- Date of birth: 18 July 1997 (age 29)
- Place of birth: Lomas de Zamora, Argentina
- Height: 1.60 m (5 ft 3 in)
- Position: Midfielder

Team information
- Current team: Boca Juniors
- Number: 10

Senior career*
Years	Team	Apps	(Gls)
2012	Independiente		
2013–2014	UAI Urquiza		
2014–2015	San Lorenzo		
2015	SECLA (futsal)		
2015	→ San Lorenzo (futsal) (loan)		
2016	Santiago Morning		
2016–	Boca Juniors		
2017	Racing (futsal)		
2018	San Lorenzo (futsal)		
2023–	San Lorenzo de Almagro		

International career^{‡}
2012–2013	Argentina U17		
2012–2015	Argentina U20		
2014–	Argentina	5	(1)
Medal record
Women's football
Representing Argentina
Pan American Games
Silver medal – second place	2019 Lima	Team
- * Club domestic league appearances and goals ‡ National team caps and goals as of 3 March 2019

Erika Micaela Cabrera (born 18 July 1997) is an Argentine footballer and futsal player who plays as a midfielder for San Lorenzo de Almagro and the Argentina women's national team.

== International career ==
Cabrera represented Argentina at the 2012 South American U-17 Women's Championship, the 2012 FIFA U-20 Women's World Cup and two South American U-20 Women's Championship editions (2014 and 2015). At senior level, she played the 2014 South American Games, the 2014 Copa América Femenina and the 2015 Pan American Games. (Note: 2015 Pan American Games matches are not recognised by FIFA.)

=== International goals ===
Scores and results list Argentina's goal tally first

No.	Date	Venue	Opponent	Score	Result	Competition
1	16 September 2014	Estadio Alejandro Serrano Aguilar, Cuenca, Ecuador	Paraguay	1–0	1–0	2014 Copa América Femenina
