= Rowdy the Roadrunner =

Rowdy
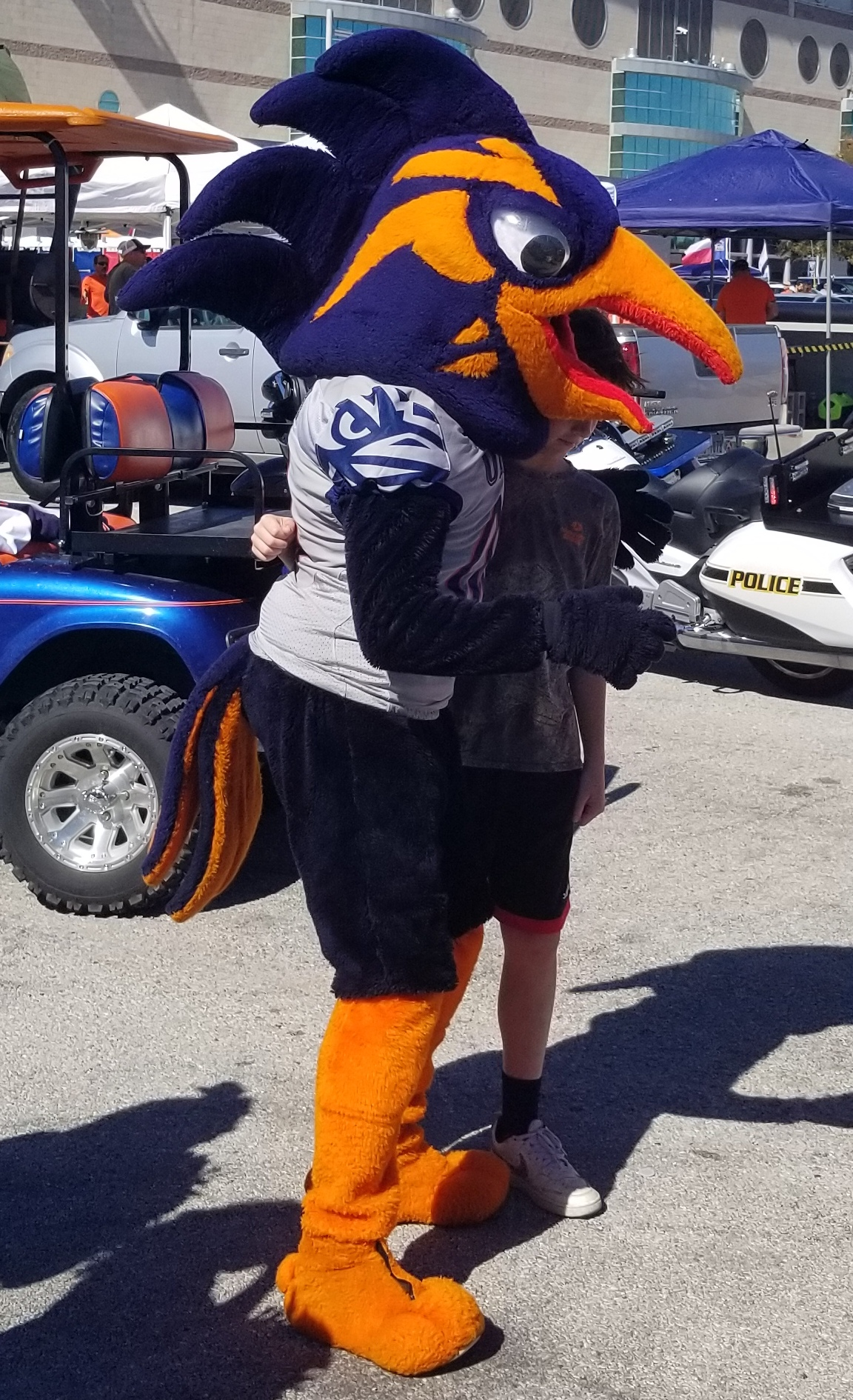
- Rowdy the Roadrunner
- University: University of Texas at San Antonio
- Conference: The American
- Description: Anthropomorphic roadrunner
- Origin of name: Student election
- First seen: 1977

Rowdy (officially Rowdy the Roadrunner) is the mascot of the University of Texas at San Antonio Roadrunners. He appears at athletic events, such as football and basketball games, and other university sponsored events. An anthropomorphic roadrunner, Rowdy is based upon the Greater Roadrunner.

== History ==
The origin of Rowdy dates back to 1977, when the Student Representative Assembly (SRA, the forerunner to the modern Student Government Association) was openly debating the university's mascot. An original vote, which favored "Armadillos" and "Stars" was declared null and void by the SRA, making way for a second campus-wide poll. The second election was hotly contested between "Roadrunners" and "Armadillos"—with vigorous support on either side. Supporters of "Roadrunner" made t-shirts depicting the cartoon road runner from Warner Bros. After the final vote, the roadrunner was announced as the official mascot of UTSA at a bonfire celebration later that year.

The older version of Rowdy.

On March 1, 2008, UTSA unveiled the new Rowdy and UTSA logos at the homecoming men's basketball game vs. Texas A&M University–Corpus Christi. Many students and administrators at UTSA thought the previous Rowdy bore too much resemblance to the Kansas Jayhawk.

In 2013 UTSA unveiled a statue of Rowdy.
