= Carolina Birizamberri =

Uruguayan football and futsal player (born 1995)

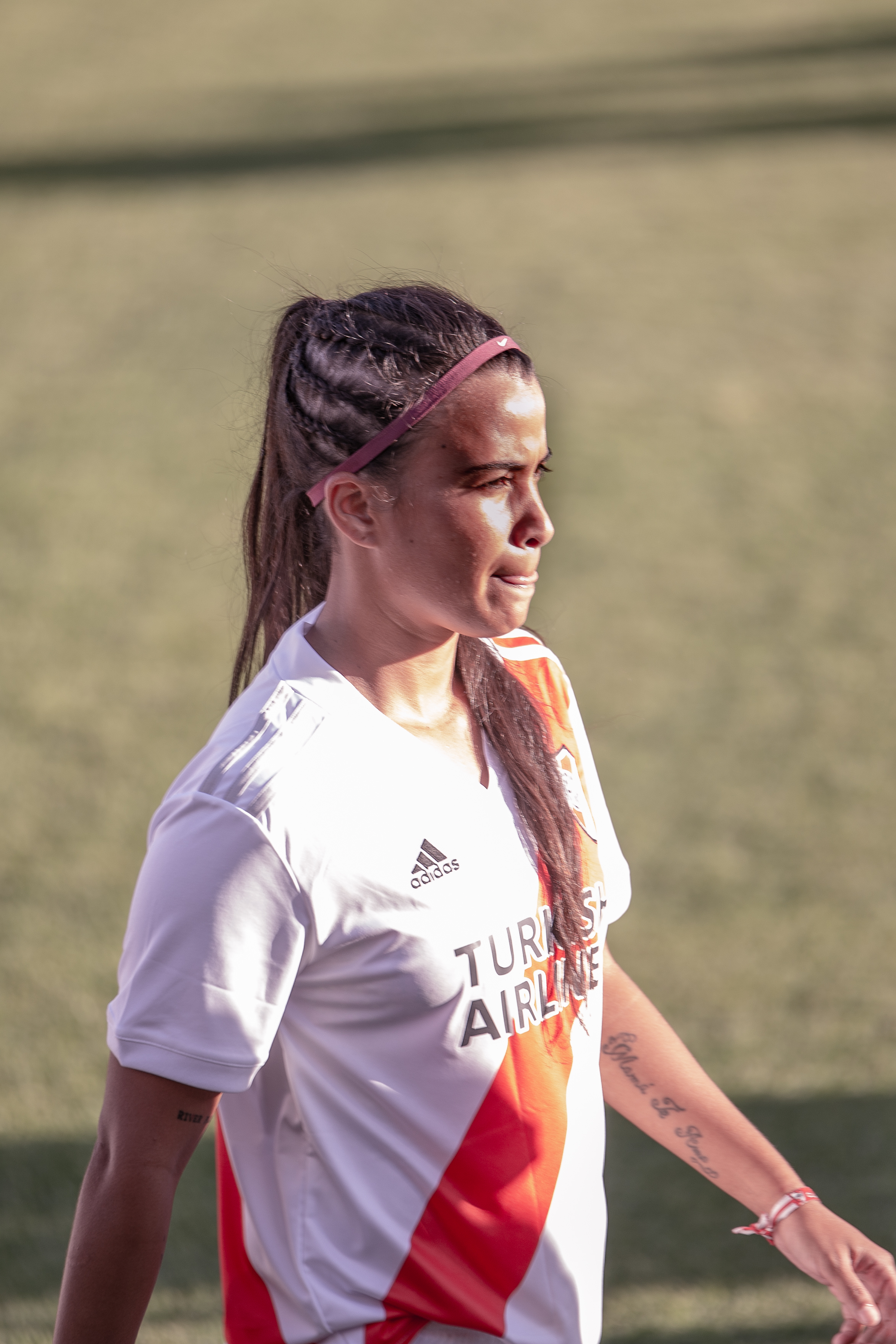
- Birizamberri playing for Argentine club River Plate in 2021

Personal information
- Full name: María Carolina Birizamberri Rivero
- Date of birth: 9 July 1995 (age 31)
- Place of birth: Montevideo, Uruguay
- Height: 1.72 m (5 ft 8 in)
- Positions: Forward; attacking midfielder

Team information
- Current team: River Plate
- Number: 11

Senior career*
Years	Team	Apps	(Gls)
2008	Cerro	1	(1)
2009–2012	Bella Vista	39	(72)
2012–2013	Nacional	17	(31)
2014–2015	River Plate Montevideo	18	(53)
2016–	River Plate	191	(157)
2018	River Plate (futsal)		
2019	→ CD Parquesol (loan)	12	(5)
2019–	River Plate (futsal)	13	(19)

International career^{‡}
2012	Uruguay U17	6	(4)
2014	Uruguay U20	4	(0)
2010–	Uruguay	15	(7)
- * Club domestic league appearances and goals ‡ National team caps and goals as of 12 April 2024

María Carolina Birizamberri Rivero (born 9 July 1995) is a Uruguayan footballer and futsal player who plays as a forward for Argentine club River Plate and the Uruguay women's national team.

== Club career ==
Birizamberri is a three-time Campeonato Uruguayo Femenino top scorer. In 2015, she scored 53 goals in 18 matches for River Plate Montevideo. After that, she joined River Plate from Argentina.

== International career ==
Birizamberri represented Uruguay at the 2012 South American U-17 Women's Championship, 2012 FIFA U-17 Women's World Cup and the 2014 South American U-20 Women's Championship. At the senior level, she played three Copa América Femenina editions (2010, 2014 and 2018).

=== International goals ===
Scores and results list Uruguay's goal tally first

No.	Date	Venue	Opponent	Score	Result	Competition
1	11 November 2010	Estadio Alejandro Serrano Aguilar, Cuenca, Ecuador	Venezuela	2–3	2–5	2010 South American Women's Football Championship

== Honours and achievements ==
=== Club ===
River Plate

- Campeonato de Fútbol Femenino: 2016–17

=== Individual ===
- Campeonato Uruguayo Femenino top scorer: 2011 (for Bella Vista), 2013 (for Nacional), 2015 (for River Plate Montevideo)
- Copa Libertadores Femenina top scorer: 2017 (for River Plate)
- Premio Charrúa as the 2012 Best Uruguayan Women's Footballer
