= Antonella Ferradans =

Uruguayan footballer (born 2001)

Personal information
- Full name: María Antonella Ferradans Cayetano
- Date of birth: 2 May 2001 (age 25)
- Place of birth: Paysandú, Uruguay
- Height: 1.69 m (5 ft 7 in)
- Positions: Left-back; centre-back

Team information
- Current team: Ferro Carril Oeste

Youth career
- 2014–2017: Nacional

Senior career*
Years	Team	Apps	(Gls)
2015–2016	Nacional	2	(0)
2018–2019	Progreso	21	(4)
2020–2023	Nacional	?	(?)
2024–2025	PAOK	16	(2)
2025–	Ferro Carril Oeste		

International career^{‡}
2018	Uruguay U17	2	(0)
2020	Uruguay U20	4	(0)
2019–	Uruguay	11	(0)
- * Club domestic league appearances and goals as of 27 December 2024 ‡ National team caps and goals as of 14 May 2025

María Antonella Ferradans Cayetano (born 2 May 2001), known as Antonella Ferradans, is a Uruguayan footballer who plays as a left-back for Campeonato de Fútbol Femenino club Ferro Carril Oeste and the Uruguay national team.

== International career ==
Ferradans represented Uruguay at the 2018 FIFA U-17 Women's World Cup. She made her senior debut on 23 May 2019.
