= Katerine Cubillos =

Chilean footballer

Personal information
- Full name: Katerine Paola Cubillos Ramos
- Date of birth: 6 January 2005 (age 21)
- Place of birth: Iquique, Chile
- Position: Attacking midfielder

Team information
- Current team: Deportes Iquique
- Number: 10

Youth career
- 2016–2020: CODE Iquique

Senior career*
Years	Team	Apps	(Gls)
2021–	Deportes Iquique		

International career^{‡}
2022	Chile U17	10	(2)
2025–	Chile	1	(0)
- * Club domestic league appearances and goals ‡ National team caps and goals as of 5 May 2025

Katerine Paola Cubillos Ramos (born 6 January 2005) is a Chilean footballer who plays as an attacking midfielder for Deportes Iquique in the Chilean Primera División and the Chile women's national team.

== Club career ==
Born in Iquique, Chile, Cubillos came to Deportes Iquique, then called CODE Iquique, in 2016. She has represented the first team since 2021 and signed her first professional contract on 21 March 2023, becoming the first professional player in the club history. After scoring 19 goals with 7 assists during 2024, she renewed for the 2025 season.

== International career ==
Cubillos represented Chile U17 in the 2022 South American Championship. She also represented them at the 2022 Gradisca Tournament in Cervignano del Friuli, Italy, where they became the runners-up.

At senior level, Cubillos was called up to the Chile squad for the matches against Haiti on 4 and 8 April 2025. She made her debut in the second match by replacing Karen Araya at the minute 84.
