= Gustavo Badell (footballer) =

Uruguayan footballer (born 1968)

Personal information
- Full name: Gustavo Badell Pesamosca
- Date of birth: 1 August 1968 (age 58)
- Place of birth: Montevideo, Uruguay
- Height: 1.84 m (6 ft 0 in)
- Position: Defender

Senior career*
Years	Team	Apps	(Gls)
1989–1993	Huracán Buceo		
1993	→ Colo-Colo (loan)	0	(0)
1993	→ Emelec (loan)		
1994–1997	Nacional	66	(4)
1997	Huracán Buceo		
1998	Rampla Juniors		
1999–2000	Danubio	29	(0)
2000	Olimpia	24	(1)
2001	Huracán Buceo		
2002	Central Español	22	(2)
2003–2004	Deportivo Colonia	33	(0)
2005	Rampla Juniors		
2006	Fénix	8	(1)
2006–2007	Bella Vista	8	(0)
- * Club domestic league appearances and goals

Gustavo Badell Pesamosca (born August 1, 1968) is a Uruguayan former football player. He played for clubs in Uruguay, Paraguay, Chile and Ecuador.

== Teams ==
- (Uruguay) Huracán Buceo 1989–1993
- (Chile) Colo-Colo 1993
- (Ecuador) Emelec 1993
- (Uruguay) Nacional 1994–1997
- (Uruguay) Huracán Buceo 1997
- (Uruguay) Rampla Juniors 1998
- (Uruguay) Danubio 1999–2000
- (Paraguay) Olimpia 2000
- (Uruguay) Huracán Buceo 2001
- (Uruguay) Central Español 2002
- (Uruguay) Deportivo Colonia 2003–2004
- (Uruguay) Rampla Juniors 2005
- (Uruguay) Fénix 2006
- (Uruguay) Bella Vista 2006–2007

== Personal life ==
He is the father of international footballer Yamila Badell.

== Honours and achievements ==
Colo-Colo

- Primera División: 1998
