= Karla Torres (footballer, born 2006) =

Colombian footballer (born 2006)

Personal information
- Full name: Karla Dayana Torres García
- Date of birth: 11 October 2006 (age 20)
- Place of birth: Buenaventura, Colombia
- Height: 1.71 m (5 ft 7 in)
- Positions: Midfielder; forward

Team information
- Current team: Paris FC

Senior career*
Years	Team	Apps	(Gls)
2022–2025	Santa Fe	27	(12)
2025	→ Leicester City (loan)	3	(0)
2025–	Paris FC	0	(0)

International career^{‡}
2022–2024	Colombia U-20	26	(3)
2024–	Colombia	5	(1)
- * Club domestic league appearances and goals ‡ National team caps and goals as of 6 April 2025

Karla Dayana Torres García (Latin American Spanish: [ˈkaɾla ðaˈʝana ˈtores ɣaɾˈsi.a]; born 11 October 2006) is a Colombian professional footballer who plays as a midfielder or forward for French Première Ligue club Paris FC and the Colombia national team.

== Early life ==
Raised in Buenaventura, Torres began training in football seriously when she was eight or nine.

== Club career ==
On 31 January 2025, Torres joined English club Leicester City on loan from Santa Fe.

Torres signed a three-year contract with French club Paris FC on 29 August 2025.

== International career ==
Torres represented Colombia at the 2022 FIFA U-20 Women's World Cup and 2024 FIFA U-20 Women's World Cup. At the latter tournament, held on home soil, she scored both goals in a 2–2 draw against the Netherlands in the quarterfinals, losing on penalties.

Torres made her senior debut on 29 October 2024, appearing in a 3–1 friendly defeat to Brazil.

On 6 April 2025, she scored her first goal for national team against Japan in a friendly match.

== International goals ==
No.	Date	Venue	Opponent	Score	Result	Competition
1.	6 April 2025	Yodoko Sakura Stadium, Osaka, Japan	Japan	1–0	1–1	Friendly
