= Lisa Campos =

University athletics director

Current position
- Title: Athletic director
- Team: UTSA
- Conference: The American

Biographical details
- Born: 1976 or 1977 (age 48–49); La Junta, Colorado, U.S.
- Education: Colorado State University, University of Texas at El Paso

Administrative career (AD unless noted)
- 2003–2012: UTEP (Associate AD)
- 2012–2017: Northern Arizona
- 2018–present: UTSA

Lisa Campos is the current director of athletics for the University of Texas at San Antonio. She previously served as athletic director for Northern Arizona University from 2012 to 2017, and as an associate athletic director at the University of Texas at El Paso from 2003 to 2012. Campos graduated from Colorado State University with both bachelor's and master's degrees. She graduated from the University of Texas at El Paso with a doctorate degree. Campos was named athletic director at the University of Texas at San Antonio on November 16, 2017. Campos also represents Conference USA on the NCAA Division I Council.
