= Rolfo =

Italian manufacturer of trailers

Rolfo S.p.A.
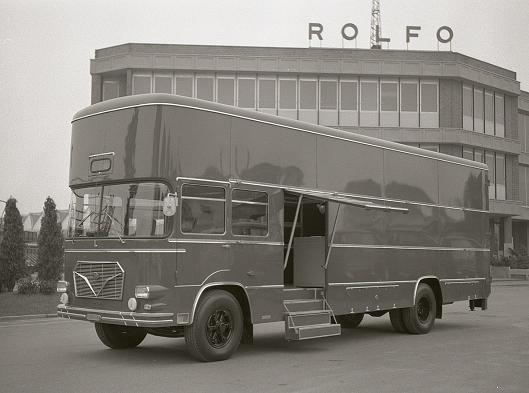
- Company type: Joint-stock company, subsidiary
- Industry: Trailers
- Founded: 1885
- Founder: Giorgio Rolfo
- Headquarters: Bra (Northern Italy), Italy
- Area served: Europe, China

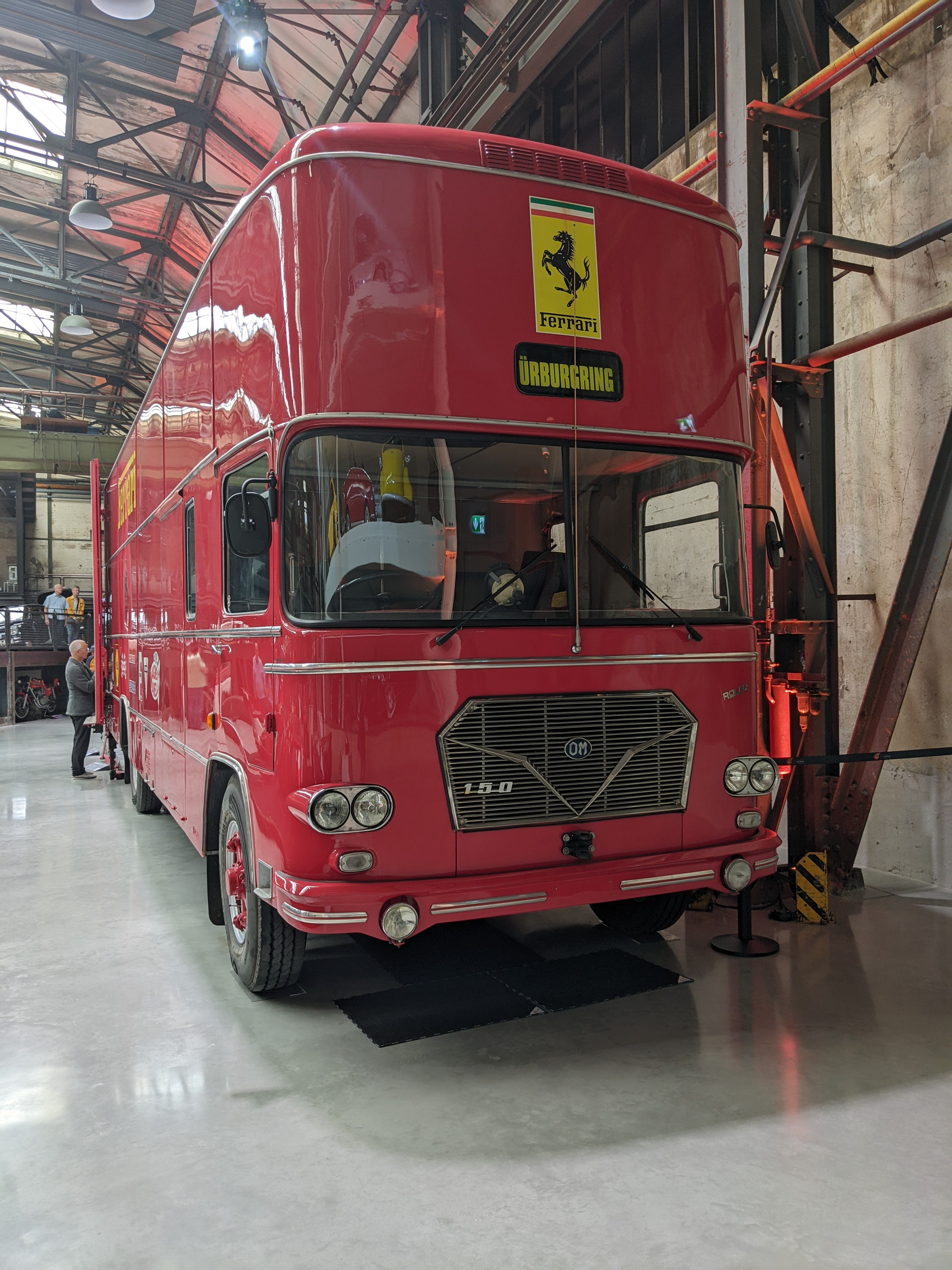
1966 model OM Fiat 150 transporter of Ferrari racing cars, on display at the Nationales Automuseum in Dietzhölztal in 2023.

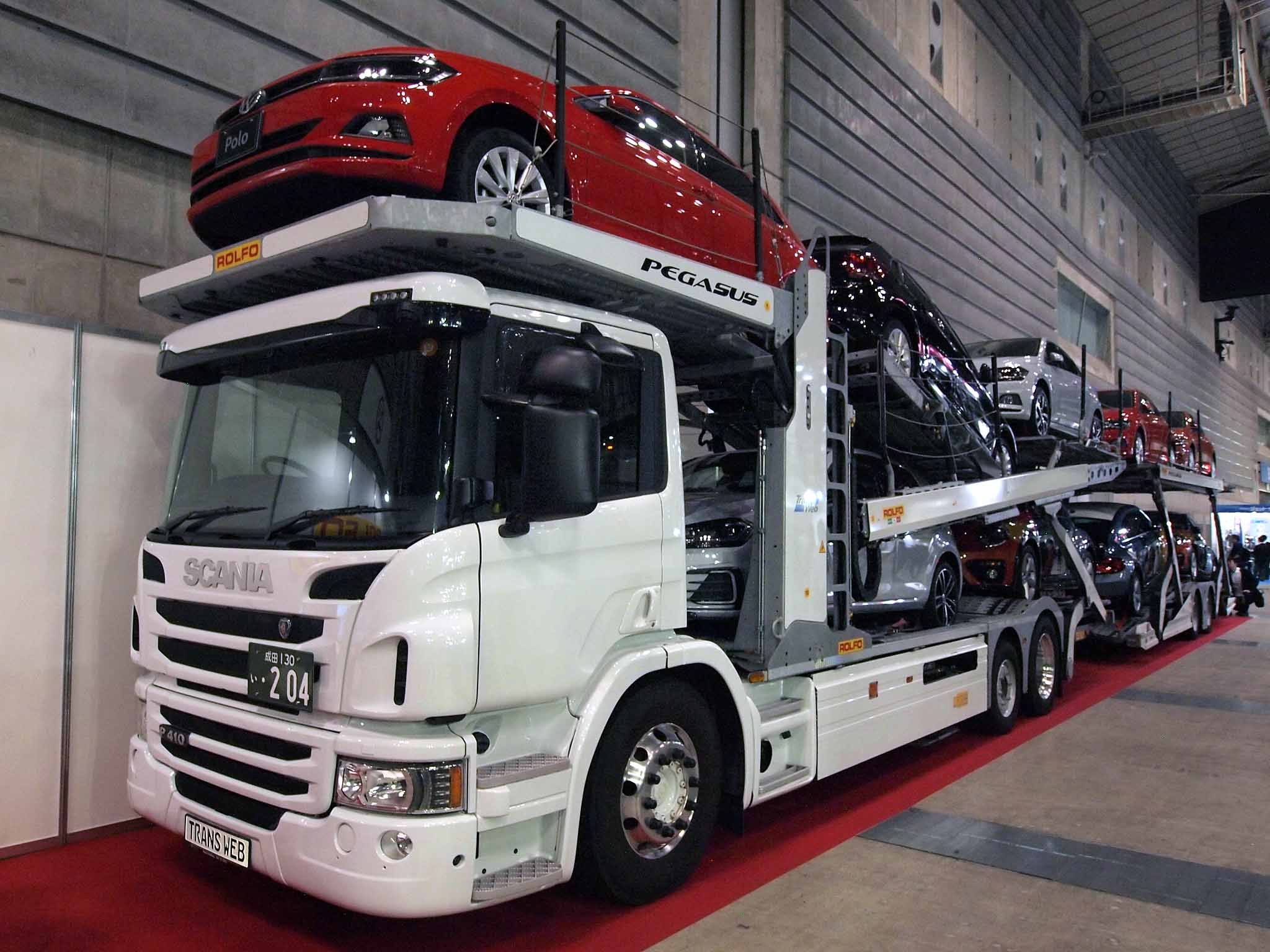
Rolfo Pegasus carriers with Scania P410

Rolfo S.p.A. is an Italian manufacturer of truck superstructures. The company is a leader in Europe. The company is specialized for truck trailers Products are used by truck manufacturers such as Iveco, Mercedes-Benz, Volvo and Scania. As of 2012 the company was led by the fourth generation of Rolfo's family.

Today the Italian company has a museum recapitulating its 120 years of existence.

== History ==
The company was created in 1885 by Italian Giorgo Rolfo in the north part of Italy. It started in a medium-sized workshop. Later the company start to build wagons and carriages. In the 1950s Rolfo made wagons for special vehicles. Special wagons were constructed for Fiat, Alfa Romeo and Lancia trucks.

== Museum ==
The museum displays early machines and carriages built by the family, including a flanging machine, drills, a farm cart and more special vehicles.

== Products ==
=== Truck carriers ===
- Gemini
- Centaurus
- Hercules

=== Short long ===
- Dynamic
- Ego
- Active
- Free
- U.K.
- Pegasus H
- Pegasus L
- Sirio L
- Sirio H
