= Yamila Badell =

Uruguayan footballer (born 1996)

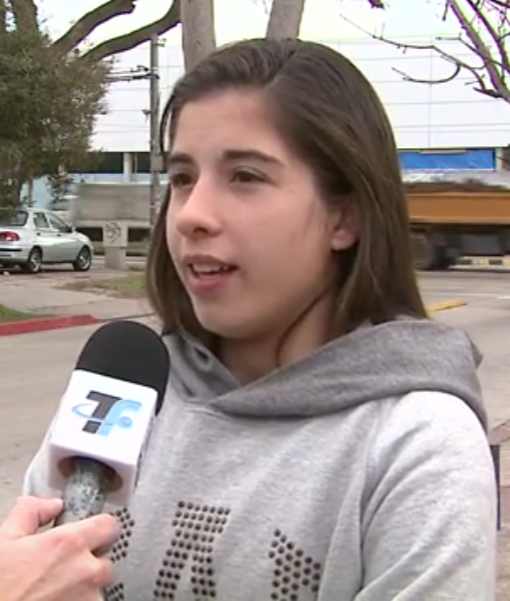
- In a 2015 interview

Personal information
- Birth name: Yamila Badell Graña
- Date of birth: 1 March 1996 (age 30)
- Place of birth: Montevideo, Uruguay
- Height: 1.55 m (5 ft 1 in)
- Position: Forward

Team information
- Current team: Real Oviedo
- Number: 16

Senior career*
Years	Team	Apps	(Gls)
2010–2015	Colón		
2015–2016	Málaga		
2016–2017	Colón		
2017–2019	Tacón		
2019–2021	Racing Féminas	36	(7)
2021	Nacional		
2022–	Real Oviedo	10	(7)

International career^{‡}
2012	Uruguay U17	10	(11)
2014–	Uruguay	6	(2)
- * Club domestic league appearances and goals as of 28 May 2022 ‡ National team caps and goals as of 12 April 2018

Yamila Badell Graña (born 1 March 1996) is a Uruguayan footballer who plays as a forward for Spanish Primera Federación club Real Oviedo and the Uruguay women's national team. She is the first player in her country to score in a FIFA U-17 Women's World Cup.

== Club career ==
She started playing baby football at the club Playa Honda, facing boys. She later joined Colón Football Club of the AUF. In 2015 she emigrated to Spain to play for Málaga for half a season. She returned to Colón in 2016 and the club won its fourth consecutive Uruguayan Championship.

In December 2017, Badell joined Spanish club CD Tacón.

In June 2019, Badell left Tacón after the team promoted to the Primera División and then its place was purchased by Real Madrid CF.

== International career ==
Badell participated in the 2012 South American Under-17 Women's Championship in Bolivia, where she was crowned the tournament's top scorer with 9 goals, and together with her teammates achieved the historical first qualification of a Uruguayan women's team to a FIFA World Cup.

In the U-17 World Cup, played in Azerbaijan, Uruguay lost its three matches, but Badell managed to score twice in the last match against Germany (a 2–5 defeat), thus marking the first goal by a Uruguayan in a FIFA Women's World Cup.

=== International goals ===
Scores and results list Uruguay's goal tally first

No.	Date	Venue	Opponent	Score	Result	Competition
1	19 September 2014	Estadio La Cocha, Latacunga, Ecuador	Ecuador	2–0	2–1	2014 Copa América Femenina
2	8 April 2018	Estadio La Portada, La Serena, Chile	Peru	1–1	1–1	2018 Copa América Femenina
3	7 April 2023	Estadio Parque Capurro, Montevideo, Uruguay	Peru	4–0	6–1	Friendly
4	7 April 2023	Estadio Parque Capurro, Montevideo, Uruguay	Peru	5–0	6–1	Friendly

== Personal life ==
Yamila Badell is the daughter of former footballer Gustavo Badell.

== Honours ==
- Top Goalscorer South American Under-17 Women's Championship: 2012
- First Uruguayan to score in a FIFA U-17 Women's World Cup: 2012
