= 2012 South American U-17 Women's Championship =

2012 South American Under-17 Women's Championship
Tournament details
- Host country: Bolivia
- Dates: 9–25 March
- Teams: 10 (from 1 confederation)
- Venues: 2 (in 2 host cities)

Final positions
- Champions: Brazil (2nd title)
- Runners-up: Uruguay
- Third place: Colombia
- Fourth place: Argentina

Tournament statistics
- Matches played: 26
- Goals scored: 110 (4.23 per match)
- Top scorer: (Uruguay) Yamila Badell (9 goals)

The 2012 South American Under-17 Women's Football Championship was the third instance of the South American Under-17 Women's Football Championship. It was held from 9 to 25 March in Sucre and Santa Cruz, Bolivia. The top three teams qualified to the 2012 FIFA U-17 Women's World Cup held in Azerbaijan.

== Hosts ==
Bolivia was awarded the tournament on 24 November 2011.

== Venues ==
| City / Town | Stadium | Capacity |
|---|---|---|
| Santa Cruz | Estadio Ramón Tahuichi Aguilera | 38,000 |
| Montero | Estadio Gilberto Parada | 18,000 |
| Sucre | Estadio Olímpico Patria | 32,000 |

== Group stage ==
Matches as of the regulations. If teams are tied on points, the tiebreakers are in descending order: goal difference, goals scored, direct-matches between tied teams and finally the draw.

=== Group A ===
All Group A matches were played in Sucre.

| Team | Pld | W | D | L | GF | GA | GD | Pts |
|---|---|---|---|---|---|---|---|---|
| Uruguay | 4 | 4 | 0 | 0 | 13 | 5 | +8 | 12 |
| Argentina | 4 | 3 | 0 | 1 | 8 | 4 | +4 | 9 |
| Ecuador | 4 | 1 | 1 | 2 | 7 | 11 | −4 | 4 |
| Bolivia | 4 | 1 | 0 | 3 | 10 | 11 | −1 | 3 |
| Peru | 4 | 0 | 1 | 3 | 4 | 11 | −7 | 1 |

10 March 2012
15:00

| Argentina | 1–0 | Ecuador |
|---|---|---|
| Cabrera 17' | Report |

Estadio Olímpico Patria, Sucre
10 March 2012
18:00

| Bolivia | 4–1 | Peru |
|---|---|---|
| Méndez 12', 31'; Dulce Dorada 89'; Paola Vázquez 90+1' | Report | Quesada 49' |

Estadio Olímpico Patria, Sucre

12 March 2012

| Argentina | 3–0 | Peru |
|---|---|---|
| Aldana Benítez 21'; Pizango 38' (o.g.); Cabrera 45' | Report |

Estadio Olímpico Patria, Sucre
12 March 2012

| Ecuador | 2–7 | Uruguay |
|---|---|---|
| Emily Evans 27'; Margaret Barre 63' | Report | Badell 17'; González 31'; Alaldes Bonilla 38'; Keisy Silvera 55', 66'; Birizamberri 69'; Felipe 78' |

Estadio Olímpico Patria, Sucre

14 March 2012

| Peru | 1–1 | Ecuador |
|---|---|---|
| Cisneros 62' | | Margarita Barre 44' |

Estadio Olímpico Patria, Sucre
14 March 2012

| Uruguay | 2–1 | Bolivia |
|---|---|---|
| Badell 75' (pen.), 90+1' | Report | Claudia Flores 26' |

Estadio Olímpico Patria, Sucre

16 March 2012

| Uruguay | 1–0 | Argentina |
|---|---|---|
| Birizamberri 42' |

Estadio Olímpico Patria, Sucre
16 March 2012

| Ecuador | 4–2 | Bolivia |
|---|---|---|
| Angie Ponce 36'; Margarita Barre 45+1'; Dayana Díaz 71', 73' | | Claudia Flores 87'; Paola Vásquez 89' |

Estadio Olímpico Patria, Sucre

18 March 2012

| Peru | 2–3 | Uruguay |
|---|---|---|
| Ramos 11'; Astrid Ramírez 44' | Report | Rolfo 19'; Alaides Bonilla 27'; Badell 75' |

Estadio Olímpico Patria, Sucre
18 March 2012

| Bolivia | 3–4 | Argentina |
|---|---|---|
| Ortiz 24'; Méndez 86'; Rojas 90+3' | Report | Cabrera 6'; Daniela Rotela 25'; Cintia López 27'; Selena Molina 38' (pen.) |

Estadio Olímpico Patria, Sucre

=== Group B ===
All Group B matches were played in Santa Cruz.

| Team | Pld | W | D | L | GF | GA | GD | Pts |
|---|---|---|---|---|---|---|---|---|
| Brazil | 4 | 4 | 0 | 0 | 24 | 1 | +23 | 12 |
| Colombia | 4 | 3 | 0 | 1 | 9 | 6 | +3 | 9 |
| Venezuela | 4 | 2 | 0 | 2 | 7 | 7 | 0 | 6 |
| Paraguay | 4 | 1 | 0 | 3 | 4 | 14 | −10 | 3 |
| Chile | 4 | 0 | 0 | 4 | 1 | 17 | −16 | 0 |

9 March 2012
17:00

| Colombia | 2–1 | Venezuela |
|---|---|---|
| Arbeláez 70'; Regnier 81' | Report | Zambrano 20' |

Estadio Ramón Tahuichi Aguilera, Santa Cruz
9 March 2012
19:00

| Brazil | 7–0 | Paraguay |
|---|---|---|
| Brena Carolina 35', 60'; Andressinha 63', 87' (pen.); Gabrielly Salgado 66'; Djenifer Becker 77'; Maxinny Lúcia Pereira Damasceno 78' |

Estadio Ramón Tahuichi Aguilera, Santa Cruz

11 March 2012

| Paraguay | 0–3 | Colombia |
|---|---|---|
| | | Regnier 49'; Dayana Castillo 65'; María Andrea Otero 85' |

Estadio Gilberto Parada, Montero
11 March 2012

| Chile | 0–3 | Venezuela |
|---|---|---|
| | Report | Romero 13'; Moreno 45+1'; Pérez 64' |

Estadio Gilberto Parada, Montero

13 March 2012

| Colombia | 3–0 | Chile |
|---|---|---|
| Santos 12', 53'; Dayana Castillo 46' | Report |

Estadio Ramón Tahuichi Aguilera, Santa Cruz
13 March 2012

| Venezuela | 0–3 | Brazil |
|---|---|---|
| | | Gabrielly Salgado 57', 60'; Maxinny Lúcia Pereira Damasceno 77' |

Estadio Ramón Tahuichi Aguilera, Santa Cruz

15 March 2012

| Paraguay | 2–1 | Chile |
|---|---|---|
| Tania Espínola 15'; Mendoza 72' | | Melisa Rodríguez 26' |

Estadio Ramón Tahuichi Aguilera, Santa Cruz
15 March 2012

| Brazil | 5–1 | Colombia |
|---|---|---|
| Byanca Brasil 26', 33'; Brena Carolina 45'; Andressinha 70'; Keila Carvalho 75' | Report | Santos 42' |

Estadio Ramón Tahuichi Aguilera, Santa Cruz

17 March 2012

| Venezuela | 3–2 | Paraguay |
|---|---|---|
| Evelin Alaya 9'; Pérez 13'; Zambrano 43' | | Alejandra Jara 59'; Mendoza 66' |

Estadio Gilberto Parada, Montero
17 March 2012

| Chile | 0–9 | Brazil |
|---|---|---|
| | Report | Byanca Brasil 3', 18', 28', 39'; Brena Carolina 25', 61' (pen.), 73' (pen.), 89'; Leslie Alarcon 87' (o.g.) |

Estadio Gilberto Parada, Montero

== Final round ==
The top two teams of each group played another round-robin. Brazil, Uruguay and Colombia qualified to the 2012 FIFA U-17 Women's World Cup in Azerbaijan.

| Team | Pld | W | D | L | GF | GA | GD | Pts |
|---|---|---|---|---|---|---|---|---|
| Brazil | 3 | 3 | 0 | 0 | 9 | 2 | +7 | 9 |
| Uruguay | 3 | 2 | 0 | 1 | 6 | 4 | +2 | 6 |
| Colombia | 3 | 1 | 0 | 2 | 6 | 5 | +1 | 3 |
| Argentina | 3 | 0 | 0 | 3 | 3 | 13 | −10 | 0 |

21 March 2012

| Uruguay | 2–1 | Colombia |
|---|---|---|
| Birizamberri 20', 90' | | Dayana Castillo 60' (pen.) |

Estadio Olímpico Patria, Sucre
21 March 2012

| Brazil | 5–1 | Argentina |
|---|---|---|
| Byanca Brasil 1'; Chaiane Locatelli 7'; Mayara Vaz 67', 73'; Thaynara 86' | | Aldana Benitez 4' |

Estadio Olímpico Patria, Sucre

23 March 2012

| Uruguay | 4–2 | Argentina |
|---|---|---|
| Badell 48', 50', 70', 80' | | Cabrera 79'; Aldana Benítez 85' |

Estadio Olímpico Patria, Sucre
23 March 2012

| Brazil | 3–1 | Colombia |
|---|---|---|
| Gabrielly Salgado 41'; Andressinha 59' (pen.); Byanca Brasil 64' | | Juliana Ocampo 10' |

Estadio Olímpico Patria, Sucre

25 March 2012

| Argentina | 0–4 | Colombia |
|---|---|---|
| | | Gabriela Maldonado 41', 59'; Dayana Castillo 46'; Laura Aguirre 90' |

Estadio Olímpico Patria, Sucre
25 March 2012

| Uruguay | 0–1 | Brazil |
|---|---|---|
| | | Andressinha 10' |

Estadio Olímpico Patria, Sucre

== Top scorers ==
9 goals

- (Uruguay) Yamila Badell

8 goals

- (Brazil) Byanca Brasil

7 goals

- (Brazil) Brena Carolina

4 goals

- (Colombia) Dayana Castillo
- (Uruguay) Carolina Birizamberri

The top-scorer award was handed to Yamila Badell from Uruguay who scored nine goals in her team's seven matches. Second place went to Brazilian Byanca Brasil who scored eight goals and third place to Brazilian Brena Carolina who scored seven times.
