= Jemina Rolfo =

Uruguayan footballer (born 1995)

Personal information
- Full name: Jemina Elisabet Rolfo Cristino
- Date of birth: 20 February 1995 (age 31)
- Place of birth: Uruguay
- Height: 1.65 m (5 ft 5 in)
- Positions: Midfielder; forward

Team information
- Current team: Peñarol
- Number: 14

Senior career*
Years	Team	Apps	(Gls)
2014–2015	Montevideo Wanderers	15	(7)
2015–2016	Colón	23	(9)
2017–	Peñarol	56	(17)

International career^{‡}
2012	Uruguay U17	2+	(1)
2014	Uruguay U20		
2018–	Uruguay	5	(0)
- * Club domestic league appearances and goals ‡ National team caps and goals as of 14 May 2025

Jemina Elisabet Rolfo Cristino (born 20 February 1995) is a Uruguayan footballer who plays as a midfielder for CA Peñarol and the Uruguay women's national team.

== International career ==
Rolfo represented Uruguay at the 2012 South American U-17 Women's Championship, the 2012 FIFA U-17 Women's World Cup and the 2014 South American U-20 Women's Championship. She made her senior debut during the 2018 Copa América Femenina on 4 April that year in a 0–7 loss to Colombia.
