= Isabelle Kadzban =

Chilean footballer (born 2001)

Personal information
- Full name: Isabelle Marie Kadzban Mahoney
- Date of birth: 20 December 2001 (age 24)
- Place of birth: Grand Rapids, Michigan, U.S.
- Height: 1.60 m (5 ft 3 in)
- Position: Forward

Team information
- Current team: Real Estelí

Youth career
- Pachuca FC USA

College career
Years	Team	Apps	(Gls)
2020–2021	Florida Gators	10	(0)
2022–2024	American Eagles	46	(6)

Senior career*
Years	Team	Apps	(Gls)
2016–2019	Florida Kraze Krush		
2021	Universidad Católica	3	(2)
2025	Colo-Colo	16	(3)
2026	Aris Ladies		
2026–	Real Estelí		

International career^{‡}
2018	Chile U17	7	(4)
- Chile U20
2019–	Chile	2	(1)
- * Club domestic league appearances and goals as of 5 February 2026 ‡ National team caps and goals as of 10 July 2023

Isabelle Marie Kadzban Mahoney (born 20 December 2001), known in the United States as Izzy Kadzban, is a footballer who plays as a forward for Nicaraguan club Real Estelí. Born in the United States, she plays for the Chile women's national team.

== Club career ==
As a youth player, Kadzban was with Pachuca FC USA. After, she spent two seasons with Florida Gators of University of Florida and four years with Florida Kraze Krush in the ECNL.

In 2021, she had a stint in Chile with Universidad Católica.

Back in the United States, she joined American University Women's Soccer (AU Eagles).

In 2025, Kadzban returned to Chile and signed with Colo-Colo.

In January 2026, Kadzban moved to Europe and signed with Cypriot club Aris Ladies. She switched to Nicaraguan club Real Estelí in the second half of the year.

== International career ==
At youth level, Kadzban represented both Chile U17 and Chile U20 in 2018 and 2020, respectively.

She made her senior debut on 6 October 2019.

== Personal life ==
Kadzban qualifies to play for Chile through her maternal grandmother, a Rapa Nui from the Easter Island.
