= 2010 South American U-17 Women's Championship =

2010 South American Under-17 Women's Championship
Sudamericano Femenino Sub 17

Tournament details
- Host country: Brazil
- Dates: 28 January – 11 February
- Teams: 10 (from 1 confederation)
- Venue: (in 1 host city)

Final positions
- Champions: Brazil (1st title)
- Runners-up: Chile
- Third place: Venezuela
- Fourth place: Paraguay

Tournament statistics
- Matches played: 24
- Goals scored: 96 (4 per match)

The 2010 South American Under-17 Women's Championship was the second instance of the South American Under-17 Women's Championship. It was held from 28 January to 11 February in São Paulo, Brazil. As the top 3 teams, Brazil, Chile, and Venezuela qualified for the 2010 FIFA U-17 Women's World Cup held in Trinidad and Tobago.

== Group stage ==
=== Group A ===
Team	Pld	W	D	L	GF	GA	GD	Pts
Brazil	4	4	0	0	28	1	+27	12
Paraguay	4	2	1	1	9	6	+3	7
Bolivia	4	2	1	1	5	4	+1	7
Peru	4	1	0	3	3	13	−10	3
Ecuador	4	0	0	4	1	22	−21	0

29 January 2010

Bolivia	3–0	Peru

29 January 2010

Ecuador	0–3	Paraguay

31 January 2010

Peru	3–1	Ecuador

31 January 2010

Brazil	3–0	Bolivia

2 February 2010

Paraguay	4–0	Peru

2 February 2010

Ecuador	0–15	Brazil

4 February 2010

Bolivia	1–0	Ecuador

4 February 2010

Brazil	5–1	Paraguay

6 February 2010

Paraguay	1–1	Bolivia

6 February 2010

Peru	0–5	Brazil

=== Group B ===
Team	Pld	W	D	L	GF	GA	GD	Pts
Chile	4	2	2	0	9	3	+6	8
Venezuela	4	2	1	1	7	4	+3	7
Argentina	4	2	1	1	5	4	+1	7
Colombia	4	2	0	2	6	5	+1	6
Uruguay	4	0	0	4	2	13	−11	0

28 January 2010

Chile	2–2	Venezuela

28 January 2010

Colombia	3–1	Uruguay

30 January 2010

Venezuela	1–0	Colombia

30 January 2010

Argentina	1–1	Chile

1 February 2010

Uruguay	1–4	Venezuela

1 February 2010

Colombia	3–1	Argentina

3 February 2010

Chile	2–0	Colombia

3 February 2010

Argentina	2–0	Uruguay

5 February 2010

Uruguay	0–4	Chile

5 February 2010

Venezuela	0–1	Argentina

== Knockout stage ==
The winners of the two semifinal matches will qualify directly to the 2010 FIFA U-17 Women's World Cup held in Trinidad and Tobago. The losers of the semifinal matches will contest in a third-place match to determine who receives the last qualifying spot for the 2010 World Cup.

Semi-finals
9 February – São Paulo
Chile	4
Paraguay	1
9 February – São Paulo
Brazil	6
Venezuela	2

Final
11 February – São Paulo
Chile	0
Brazil	7
Third place
11 February – São Paulo
Paraguay	0
Venezuela	1

=== Semi-finals ===
9 February 2010
15:50

Chile	4–1	Paraguay

Estádio do Pacaembu, São Paulo
Referee: Shirley Cornejo (Bolivia)

9 February 2010
18:00

Brazil	6–2	Venezuela

Estádio do Pacaembu, São Paulo
Referee: Melany Bermejo (Peru)

=== Third place match ===
11 February 2010
18:00

Paraguay	0–1	Venezuela

Estádio do Pacaembu, São Paulo
Referee: Claudia Inés Umpiérrez (Uruguay)

=== Final ===
11 February 2010
18:00

Chile	0–7	Brazil

Estádio do Pacaembu, São Paulo
Referee: Jesica Salomé Di Iorio (Argentina)

2010 South American Under 17 Women Championship

Brazil
First title
