= Estadio Gilberto Parada =

Coordinates: 17.3429°S 63.2614°W

Estadio Municipal Gilberto Parada
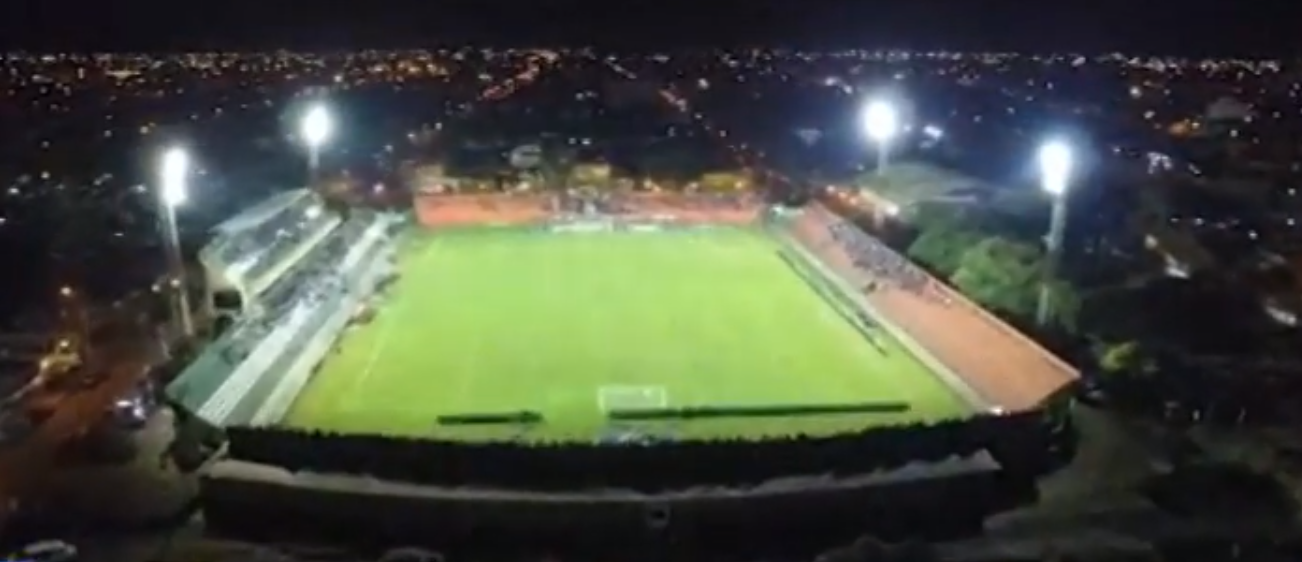
- Estadio Gilberto Parada, Montero
- Interactive map of Estadio Municipal Gilberto Parada
- Location: Montero, Bolivia
- Capacity: 13,000; 10,630 (international)

Construction
- Opened: 1980

Estadio Gilberto Parada is a multi-use stadium in Montero, Bolivia. It is currently used mostly for football matches and serves as the home of Guabirá of the Liga de Fútbol Profesional Boliviano. The stadium has a capacity of 13,000 people.
