= Uruguay women's national under-17 football team =

Uruguay
- Nickname(s): Las Celestes, Charrúas
- Association: Asociación Uruguaya de Fútbol
- Head coach: Pablo Herrera Bazzani
- Most caps: Yamila Badell (10 matches)
- Top scorer: Yamila Badell (11 goals)
- FIFA code: URU
| First colours | Second colours |

First international
- Uruguay 0 – 1 Brazil (Santiago, Chile; January 13, 2008) (Official)

Biggest win
- Uruguay 7 – 2 Ecuador (Sucre, Bolivia; March 12, 2012)

Biggest defeat
- Uruguay 0 – 5 Ghana (Baku, Azerbaijan; September 26, 2012)

South American U-17 Women's Championship
- Appearances: 10 (first in 2008)
- Best result: Runners-up (2012)

FIFA U-17 Women's World Cup
- Appearances: 2 (first in 2012)
- Best result: Group Stage (2012, 2018)

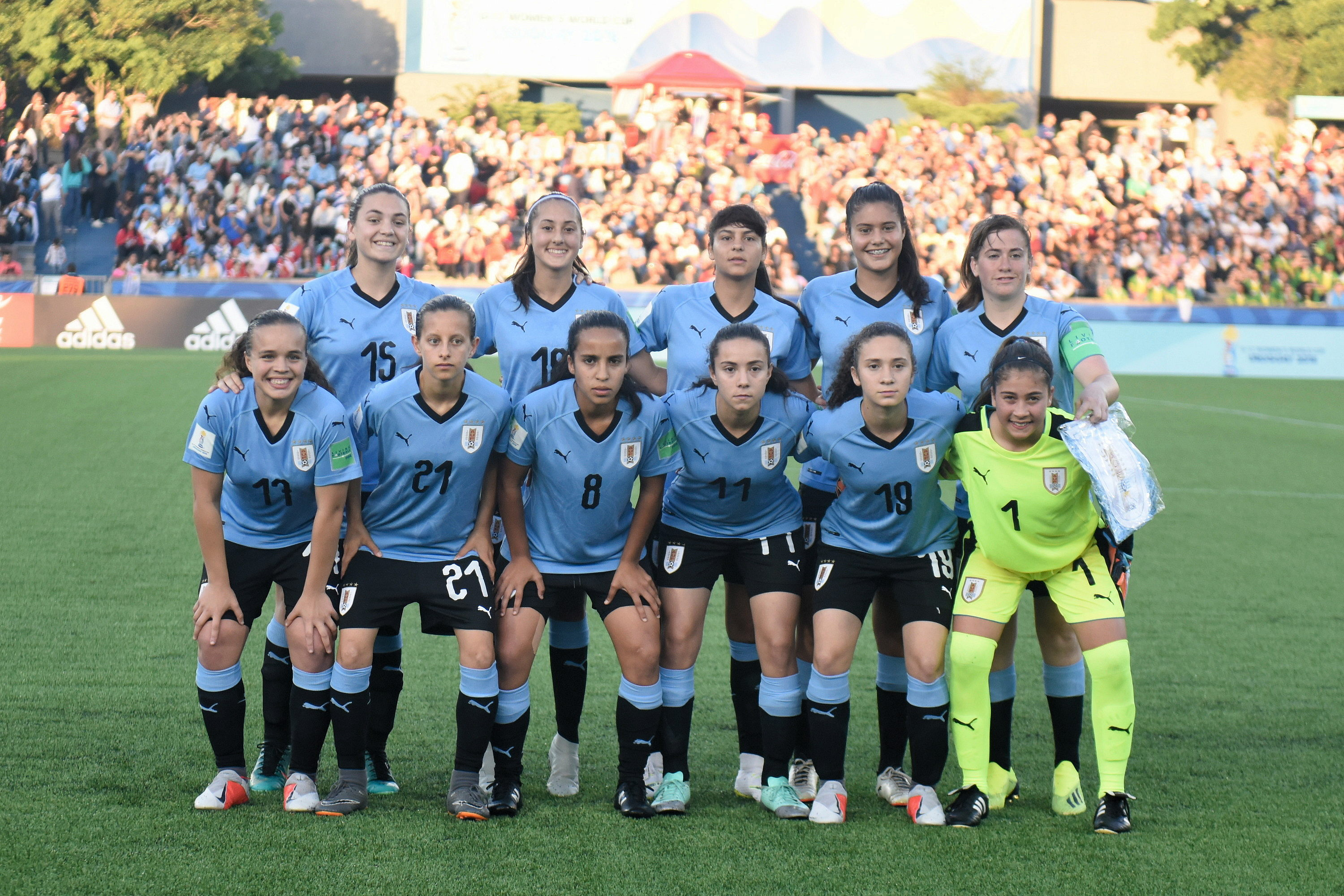
The Uruguay women's national under-17 football team in 2022

The Uruguay women's national under-17 football team represents Uruguay in international competitions.

The women's U-17 team have competed in all four South American Under-17 Women's Championships. As a result of their second place achievement in 2012 they competed at the 2012 FIFA U-17 Women's World Cup in Azerbaijan. They later took part in 2018 as host.

== Competitive record ==
=== FIFA U-17 Women's World Cup ===
FIFA U-17 Women's World Cup record
| Year | Result | Position | Pld | W | D | L | GF | GA |
|---|---|---|---|---|---|---|---|---|
| (New Zealand) 2008 | Did not qualify | | | | | | | |
| (Trinidad and Tobago) 2010 | Did not qualify | | | | | | | |
| (Azerbaijan) 2012 | Group Stage | 14th | 3 | 0 | 0 | 3 | 2 | 14 |
| (Costa Rica) 2014 | Did not qualify | | | | | | | |
| (Jordan) 2016 | Did not qualify | | | | | | | |
| (Uruguay) 2018 | Group Stage | 14th | 3 | 0 | 1 | 2 | 2 | 8 |
| (India) 2022 | Did not qualify | | | | | | | |
| (Dominican Republic) 2024 | Did not qualify | | | | | | | |
| (Morocco) 2025 | Did not qualify | | | | | | | |
| (Morocco) 2026 | Did not qualify | | | | | | | |
| Total | 2/10 | – | 6 | 0 | 1 | 5 | 4 | 22 |

=== South American Championship record ===
South American Under-17 Women's Championship
| Year | Round | Position | GP | W | D* | L | GS | GA |
|---|---|---|---|---|---|---|---|---|
| (Chile) 2008 | Group Stage | 8th | 4 | 1 | 0 | 3 | 5 | 8 |
| (Brazil) 2010 | Group Stage | 9th | 4 | 0 | 0 | 4 | 2 | 13 |
| (Bolivia) 2012 | Runners up | 2nd | 7 | 6 | 0 | 1 | 19 | 9 |
| (Paraguay) 2013 | Group Stage | 9th | 4 | 0 | 1 | 3 | 4 | 12 |
| (Venezuela) 2016 | Group Stage | 5th | 4 | 2 | 1 | 1 | 5 | 5 |
| (Argentina) 2018 | Third Place | 3rd | 7 | 4 | 2 | 1 | 8 | 5 |
| (Uruguay) 2022 | Group Stage | 7th | 4 | 1 | 1 | 2 | 4 | 4 |
| (Paraguay) 2024 | Group Stage | 6th | 4 | 2 | 0 | 2 | 6 | 9 |
| (Colombia) 2025 | Group Stage | 9th | 4 | 1 | 0 | 3 | 3 | 5 |
| (Paraguay) 2026 | Group Stage | 7th | 4 | 1 | 1 | 2 | 6 | 7 |
| Total | 10/10 | 0 Titles | 46 | 18 | 6 | 22 | 62 | 77 |
