= 2025 Colombian Women's Football League =

Liga Femenina BetPlay DIMAYOR
- Season: 2025
- Dates: 21 February – 21 September 2025
- Champions: Deportivo Cali (3rd title)
- Copa Libertadores Femenina: Deportivo Cali; Santa Fe
- Matches: 158
- Goals: 366 (2.32 per match)
- Top goalscorer: María Nela Carvajal (11 goals)
- Biggest home win: Santa Fe 6–0 Junior (23 May)
- Biggest away win: Fortaleza 1–6 Santa Fe (20 May)
- Highest scoring: Internacional 5–3 Fortaleza (15 March); Junior 4–4 Millonarios (24 March); Junior 2–6 Orsomarso (21 June)

The 2025 Colombian Women's Football League (officially known as the Liga Femenina BetPlay DIMAYOR 2025 for sponsorship purposes) was the ninth season of Colombia's women's football league. The season began on 21 February and ended on 21 September 2025.

The defending champions Deportivo Cali won their third league title, defeating Santa Fe 5–4 on kicks from the penalty mark in the final series, following a 1–1 draw on aggregate.

== Format ==
For this season the competition was played in four stages, with a round-robin first stage in which the 16 participating teams played each other once plus an additional match against their derby rival for a total of 16 rounds. The top eight teams advanced to a second stage in which they were drawn into two groups of four teams, with each team playing the others in their group twice. The novelty for this season was the addition of a semi-final stage played over two legs by the top two teams of each second stage group, with the winners facing each other in the final series to decide the league champions. Both league finalists qualified for the 2025 Copa Libertadores Femenina.

== Teams ==
16 DIMAYOR affiliate clubs took part in the competition with their women's teams, 12 of which participated in the previous season. Cúcuta Deportivo, Deportivo Pereira, and Llaneros did not enter this edition of the tournament. On the other hand, Atlético Bucaramanga, Fortaleza, Once Caldas, and Orsomarso returned to the competition. Orsomarso played its home matches in Yumbo, Valle del Cauca Department as part of a 3-year deal signed with the Yumbo Municipality, whilst Alianza, which had its women's team based in Yumbo in the previous season, moved to Agustín Codazzi, Cesar for this year.

=== Stadia and locations ===
Locations of the 2025 Liga Femenina teams

Team	City	Stadium	Capacity
Alianza	Agustín Codazzi	Municipal de Agustín Codazzi	2,000
América de Cali	Cali	Pascual Guerrero	38,588
Atlético Bucaramanga	Floridablanca	Álvaro Gómez Hurtado	12,000
Atlético Nacional	Medellín	Atanasio Girardot	44,863
Deportivo Cali	Palmira	Deportivo Cali	44,000
Deportivo Pasto	Pasto	Departamental Libertad	20,000
Fortaleza	Bogotá	Metropolitano de Techo	10,000
Independiente Medellín	Itagüí	Metropolitano Ciudad de Itagüí	12,000
Internacional	Palmira	Francisco Rivera Escobar	15,300
Junior	Barranquilla	Romelio Martínez	11,000
La Equidad	Bogotá	Metropolitano de Techo	10,000
Millonarios	Bogotá	Nemesio Camacho El Campín	39,512
Once Caldas	Manizales	Palogrande	31,611
Orsomarso	Yumbo	Municipal Raúl Miranda	3,500
Real Santander (Note: In association with Deportes Tolima.)	Piedecuesta	Villa Concha	5,500
Santa Fe	Bogotá	Nemesio Camacho El Campín	39,512

== First stage ==
The first stage started on 21 February and consisted of a single-round robin tournament with the 16 participating teams playing each other once, with an additional round against a regional rival. The top eight teams advanced to the second stage of the competition.

=== Standings ===
Pos	Team	Pld	W	D	L	GF	GA	GD	Pts	Qualification
1	Deportivo Cali	16	12	2	2	35	7	+28	38	Advance to the second stage
2	Santa Fe	16	11	2	3	32	12	+20	35	Advance to the second stage
3	Atlético Nacional	16	7	8	1	22	10	+12	29	Advance to the second stage
4	Independiente Medellín	16	9	2	5	24	14	+10	29	Advance to the second stage
5	Internacional	16	8	3	5	19	18	+1	27	Advance to the second stage
6	América de Cali	16	7	5	4	19	13	+6	26	Advance to the second stage
7	Orsomarso	16	7	4	5	23	14	+9	25	Advance to the second stage
8	Millonarios	16	6	6	4	25	20	+5	24	Advance to the second stage
9	La Equidad	16	6	6	4	14	9	+5	24	
10	Deportivo Pasto	16	6	5	5	21	17	+4	23	
11	Junior	16	3	5	8	21	37	−16	14	
12	Real Santander	16	2	7	7	9	18	−9	13	
13	Once Caldas	16	2	6	8	12	23	−11	12	
14	Alianza	16	3	1	12	15	37	−22	10	
15	Fortaleza	16	2	4	10	12	37	−25	10	
16	Atlético Bucaramanga	16	1	6	9	5	22	−17	9	

Source: Dimayor, Soccerway
Rules for classification: 1) Points, 2) Goal difference, 3) Goals for, 4) Away goals for, 5) Away goals against, 6) Yellow cards, 7) Red cards, 8) Drawing of lots.

=== Results ===
Home \ Away	ALI	AME	BUC	NAC	CAL	PAS	FOR	DIM	INT	JUN	EQU	MIL	ONC	ORS	RSA	SFE
Alianza	—	—	0–0	—	—	2–1	—	—	1–2	2–5	1–0	0–3	1–3	1–0	—	—
América de Cali	3–0	—	—	1–1	0–2	1–1	2–0	2–0	—	—	—	—	—	—	1–1	0–1
Atlético Bucaramanga	—	0–1	—	0–4	—	—	—	—	0–1	—	0–0	0–1	0–0	1–1	1–1	—
Atlético Nacional	3–1	—	—	—	0–2	2–0		2–0	—	1–0	—	—	—	—	1–0	1–1
Deportivo Cali	1–0	0–1	5–0	—	—	—	—	—	4–1	4–0	—	5–1	—	—	2–0	2–0
Deportivo Pasto	—	—	1–0	—	0–0	—	4–0	1–0	—	1–1	—	1–1	2–2	2–3	—	—
Fortaleza	1–0	—	1–1	—	1–3	—	—	1–5	—	1–0	0–1	—	—	—	1–1	1–6
Independiente Medellín	5–0	—	2–1	1–1	2–1	—	—	—	—	2–0	—	1–0	—	—	1–0	1–2
Internacional	—	1–0	—	0–0	—	2–1	5–3	3–1	—	—	0–2	—	1–0	1–0	—	—
Junior	4–3	1–2	1–0	—	—	—	—	—	1–1	—	1–3	4–4	0–0	2–6	—	—
La Equidad	—	1–2	—	1–1	0–0	1–0	2–0	0–0	—	—	—	—	1–0	—	0–0	—
Millonarios	—	1–0	—	1–3	—	—	3–0	—	1–1	—	1–1	—	4–0	1–1	—	3–1
Once Caldas	—	2–2	—	0–0	1–3	1–2	1–1	0–2	—	—	—	—	—	—	2–0	0–1
Orsomarso	—	1–1	—	1–1	0–1	—	2–0	0–1	1–0	—	1–0	—	3–0	—	—	—
Real Santander	3–2	—	0–1	—	—	0–2	—	—	1–0	1–1	—	0–0	—	1–3	—	0–0
Santa Fe	3–1	—	3–0	—	—	1–2	—	—	2–0	6–0	2–1	2–0	—	1–0	—	—

Source: Dimayor, Soccerway
Legend: Blue = home team win; Yellow = draw; Red = away team win.

== Second stage ==
The eight teams that advanced to the second stage were drawn into two groups of four teams, with the top two teams from the first stage being seeded in each group. The top two teams in each group advanced to the semi-finals.

=== Group A ===
Pos	Team	Pld	W	D	L	GF	GA	GD	Pts	Qualification	ORS	CAL	DIM	INT
1	Orsomarso	6	3	3	0	9	3	+6	12	Advance to the semi-finals	—	1–1	2–2	2–0
2	Deportivo Cali	6	2	3	1	7	3	+4	9	Advance to the semi-finals	0–1	—	1–1	0–0
3	Independiente Medellín	6	1	3	2	7	12	−5	6		0–3	0–3	—	1–1
4	Internacional	6	0	3	3	3	8	−5	3		0–0	0–2	2–3	—

Source: Dimayor
Legend: Blue = home team win; Yellow = draw; Red = away team win.
Rules for classification: 1) Points, 2) First stage position (only applies for the seeded team, if it is involved in a tie), 3) Goal difference, 4) Goals for, 5) Away goals for, 6) Away goals against, 7) First stage position.

=== Group B ===
Pos	Team	Pld	W	D	L	GF	GA	GD	Pts	Qualification	NAC	SFE	AME	MIL
1	Atlético Nacional	6	5	0	1	11	5	+6	15	Advance to the semi-finals	—	2–0	2–1	1–0
2	Santa Fe	6	2	1	3	5	6	−1	7	Advance to the semi-finals	3–1	—	0–1	1–0
3	América de Cali	6	1	3	2	5	8	−3	6		0–3	0–0	—	1–1
4	Millonarios	6	1	2	3	6	8	−2	5		1–2	2–1	2–2	—

Source: Dimayor
Legend: Blue = home team win; Yellow = draw; Red = away team win.
Rules for classification: 1) Points, 2) First stage position (only applies for the seeded team, if it is involved in a tie), 3) Goal difference, 4) Goals for, 5) Away goals for, 6) Away goals against, 7) First stage position.

== Knockout stage ==
=== Bracket ===
Semi-finals
Santa Fe	1	0	1
Orsomarso	0	0	0
Deportivo Cali	1	2	3
Atlético Nacional	1	1	2

Finals
Santa Fe	1	0	1 (4)
Deportivo Cali (p)	0	1	1 (5)

=== Semi-finals ===
Team 1	Agg.	Team 2	1st leg	2nd leg
Santa Fe	1–0	Orsomarso	1–0	0–0
Deportivo Cali	3–2	Atlético Nacional	1–1	2–1

==== First leg ====
1 September 2025	Santa Fe	1–0	Orsomarso	Bogotá
15:45 UTC−5	Zamorano 7'	Report		Stadium: El Campín; Referee: Karen Lozano

2 September 2025	Deportivo Cali	1–1	Atlético Nacional	Palmira
17:00 UTC−5	Montoya 75'	Report	González 41'	Stadium: Deportivo Cali; Referee: Vanessa Ceballos

==== Second leg ====
6 September 2025	Orsomarso	0–0 (0–1 agg.)	Santa Fe	Yumbo
15:00 UTC−5		Report		Stadium: Municipal Raúl Miranda; Referee: Mariana Serna

6 September 2025	Atlético Nacional	1–2 (2–3 agg.)	Deportivo Cali	Medellín
17:30 UTC−5	Martínez 90+6'	Report	Aponzá 57'; Montoya 74'	Stadium: Atanasio Girardot; Referee: Danna Victorino

=== Finals ===
14 September 2025
17:00 UTC−5

Santa Fe	1–0	Deportivo Cali
Valbuena 48'	Report

Estadio El Campín, Bogotá
Referee: Karen Lozano

21 September 2025
17:00 UTC−5

Deportivo Cali	1–0	Santa Fe
Cobos 42'	Report
Penalties
García (penalty scored); Guerra (penalty scored); Arboleda (penalty scored); Ibargüen (penalty scored); Sánchez (penalty scored)	5–4	(penalty missed) Zamorano; (penalty scored) Garavito; (penalty scored) Motta; (penalty scored) Hernández; (penalty scored) Aroca

Estadio Deportivo Cali, Palmira
Referee: Mariana Quintero

Tied 1–1 on aggregate, Deportivo Cali won on penalties.

Liga Femenina BetPlay DIMAYOR
2025 champions

3rd title

== Aggregate table ==
Pos	Team	Pld	W	D	L	GF	GA	GD	Pts	Qualification
1	Deportivo Cali (C)	26	16	6	4	46	13	+33	54	Qualification for Copa Libertadores Femenina
2	Santa Fe	26	15	4	7	39	19	+20	49	Qualification for Copa Libertadores Femenina
3	Atlético Nacional	24	12	9	3	35	18	+17	45	
4	Orsomarso	24	10	8	6	32	18	+14	38	
5	Independiente Medellín	22	10	5	7	31	26	+5	35	
6	América de Cali	22	8	8	6	24	21	+3	32	
7	Internacional	22	8	6	8	22	26	−4	30	
8	Millonarios	22	7	8	7	31	28	+3	29	
9	La Equidad	16	6	6	4	14	9	+5	24	
10	Deportivo Pasto	16	6	5	5	21	17	+4	23	
11	Junior	16	3	5	8	21	37	−16	14	
12	Real Santander	16	2	7	7	9	18	−9	13	
13	Once Caldas	16	2	6	8	12	23	−11	12	
14	Alianza	16	3	1	12	15	37	−22	10	
15	Fortaleza	16	2	4	10	12	37	−25	10	
16	Atlético Bucaramanga	16	1	6	9	5	22	−17	9	

Source: Dimayor
Rules for classification: 1) Points, 2) Goal difference, 3) Goals for, 4) Away goals for, 5) Away goals against, 6) Yellow cards, 7) Red cards, 8) Drawing of lots.
(C) Champions

== Top scorers ==
Rank	Player	Club	Goals
1	(Colombia) María Nela Carvajal	Orsomarso	11
2	(Colombia) Elexa Bahr	América de Cali	10
2	(Colombia) Mariana Zamorano	Santa Fe	10
4	(Colombia) Karen Castellanos	Millonarios	9
5	(Colombia) Ingrid Guerra	Deportivo Cali	8
5	(Colombia) Valentina Rojas	Independiente Medellín	8
7	(Colombia) Ana Milé González	Independiente Medellín	7
7	(Colombia) Manuela González	Atlético Nacional	7
9	(Colombia) Leidy Cobos	Deportivo Cali	6
9	(Colombia) Estefanía González	Independiente Medellín	6
9	(Colombia) Valerin Loboa	Deportivo Cali	6
9	(Colombia) Isabela Sánchez	Internacional	6
9	(Colombia) Michelle Vásquez	Deportivo Cali	6

Source: Soccerway

== See also ==
- Colombian Women's Football League
