= 2023 Colombian Women's Football League =

Liga Femenina BetPlay DIMAYOR
- Season: 2023
- Dates: 4 February – 30 June 2023
- Champions: Santa Fe (3rd title)
- Copa Libertadores Femenina: Santa Fe; América de Cali; Atlético Nacional
- Matches: 150
- Goals: 406 (2.71 per match)
- Top goalscorer: Catalina Usme (11 goals)
- Biggest home win: Dep. Cali 7–1 Atl. Bucaramanga (24 April); La Equidad 6–0 Atl. Bucaramanga (18 May); Santa Fe 7–1 Cortuluá (5 June)
- Biggest away win: Atlético Huila 0–6 América de Cali (11 March)
- Highest scoring: Dep. Cali 7–1 Atl. Bucaramanga (24 April); Santa Fe 7–1 Cortuluá (5 June)

The 2023 Colombian Women's Football League (officially known as the Liga Femenina BetPlay DIMAYOR 2023 for sponsorship purposes) was the seventh season of Colombia's women's football league. The season started on 4 February and ended on 30 June 2023.

Santa Fe won their third title in the competition, defeating the defending champions América de Cali over two legs in the final.

== Format ==
Although interest in holding a full-year women's league championship was expressed first by Colombian Football Federation (FCF) President Ramón Jesurún during the 2022 Copa América Femenina and later by the Colombian Minister of Sports María Isabel Urrutia, on 24 January 2023 the División Mayor del Fútbol Profesional Colombiano (DIMAYOR) announced that the 2023 Liga Femenina season would keep the format used in the previous season, playing the competition in the first semester of the year due to the 2023 FIFA Women's World Cup and the 2023 Copa Libertadores Femenina, the latter of which the country was due to host. The 17 participating teams played a single round-robin tournament with all teams playing each other once and having a bye day, for a total of 16 matches for each team and 17 rounds in the first stage. The top eight teams advanced to the quarter-finals, with the winners advancing to the semi-finals. The winners of each semi-final then played the finals to decide the champions. All rounds in the knockout stage were played on a home-and-away, double-legged basis. The champions and runners-up qualified for the Copa Libertadores Femenina, with a third berth (which was awarded to the FCF for being the host association of the continental competition) going to the best-placed team in the season's aggregate table, other than the finalists.

== Teams ==
17 DIMAYOR affiliate clubs took part in the competition with their women's teams. Fortaleza and Orsomarso did not enter this edition of the tournament, with these teams being replaced by Deportivo Pasto and Boyacá Chicó, the former returning after two years and the latter fielding a women's team for the first time ever. Moreover, Águilas Doradas, who were required by CONMEBOL to form a women's team in order to be able to take part in the men's 2023 Copa Sudamericana, signed a partnership with Cortuluá for this season to meet this requirement.

=== Stadia and locations ===
Locations of the 2023 Liga Femenina teams

Team	City	Stadium	Capacity
América de Cali	Cali	Pascual Guerrero	33,130
Atlético Bucaramanga	Floridablanca	Álvaro Gómez Hurtado	12,000
Atlético Huila	Neiva	Guillermo Plazas Alcid	2,500
Atlético Nacional	Medellín	Atanasio Girardot	40,043
Boyacá Chicó	Yopal (Note: Based in Tunja but playing its home games in Yopal.)	Santiago de las Atalayas	10,000
Cortuluá (Note: In association with Águilas Doradas.)	Yumbo	Municipal Raúl Miranda	3,500
Deportes Tolima	Ibagué	Manuel Murillo Toro	28,100
Deportivo Cali	Palmira	Deportivo Cali	44,000
Deportivo Pasto	Pasto	Departamental Libertad	20,000
Deportivo Pereira	Pereira	Hernán Ramírez Villegas	30,297
Independiente Medellín	Itagüí	Metropolitano Ciudad de Itagüí	12,000
Junior	Barranquilla	Romelio Martínez	8,600
La Equidad	Bogotá	Metropolitano de Techo	10,000
Llaneros	Villavicencio	Bello Horizonte	15,000
Millonarios	Bogotá	Nemesio Camacho El Campín	36,343
Real Santander	Piedecuesta	Villa Concha	5,500
Santa Fe	Bogotá	Nemesio Camacho El Campín	36,343

== First stage ==
The first stage started on 4 February and consisted of a single-round robin tournament with the 17 participating teams playing each other once. It ended on 23 May with the top eight teams advancing to the knockout stage.

=== Standings ===
Pos	Team	Pld	W	D	L	GF	GA	GD	Pts	Qualification
1	América de Cali	16	13	1	2	43	8	+35	40	Advance to the knockout stage
2	Santa Fe	16	10	5	1	33	12	+21	35	Advance to the knockout stage
3	Atlético Nacional	16	8	6	2	28	9	+19	30	Advance to the knockout stage
4	Deportivo Pereira	16	8	5	3	28	20	+8	29	Advance to the knockout stage
5	Deportivo Cali	16	7	6	3	24	18	+6	27	Advance to the knockout stage
6	Independiente Medellín	16	8	3	5	25	20	+5	27	Advance to the knockout stage
7	Cortuluá	16	7	4	5	20	13	+7	25	Advance to the knockout stage
8	La Equidad	16	7	2	7	28	20	+8	23	Advance to the knockout stage
9	Millonarios	16	6	4	6	23	21	+2	22	
10	Llaneros	16	7	1	8	21	23	−2	22	
11	Junior	16	5	6	5	17	12	+5	21	
12	Boyacá Chicó	16	4	8	4	13	15	−2	20	
13	Atlético Huila	16	5	5	6	15	21	−6	20	
14	Real Santander	16	3	4	9	13	29	−16	13	
15	Deportivo Pasto	16	3	3	10	11	34	−23	12	
16	Atlético Bucaramanga	16	1	3	12	9	41	−32	6	
17	Deportes Tolima	16	0	2	14	11	46	−35	2	

Source: Dimayor, Soccerway
Rules for classification: 1) Points, 2) Goal difference, 3) Goals for, 4) Away goals for, 5) Away goals against, 6) Drawing of lots.

=== Results ===
Home \ Away	AME	BUC	HUI	NAC	BOY	COR	TOL	CAL	PAS	PER	DIM	JUN	EQU	LLA	MIL	RSA	SFE
América de Cali	—	2–1	—	2–0	—	—	2–0	5–0	5–0	—	2–0	—	2–0	1–0	—	—	—
Atlético Bucaramanga	—	—	0–1	—	0–0	0–4	—	—	—	0–3	—	0–2	—	—	1–1	1–1	1–3
Atlético Huila	0–6	—	—	—	1–1	3–0	—	—	—	0–2	—	1–0	—	—	0–1	2–1	0–2
Atlético Nacional	—	4–0	0–0	—	0–0	—	—	—	—	—	—	1–0	1–0	5–0	3–0	3–1	—
Boyacá Chicó	0–3	—	—	—	—	1–1	—	—	—	1–2	2–0	1–1	—	—	2–1	0–0	0–2
Cortuluá	0–3	—	—	0–0	—	—	1–1	2–0	3–0	—	0–0	—	4–0	—	—	—	0–1
Deportes Tolima	—	0–1	1–3	1–4	1–3	—	—	2–3	1–2	—	—	—	0–4	0–3	—	—	—
Deportivo Cali	—	7–1	0–0	1–1	0–0	—	—	—	—	—	—	—	1–0	3–1	1–1	2–0	—
Deportivo Pasto	—	1–0	2–2	0–3	1–1	—	—	0–1	—	—	—	—	1–3	0–2	—	3–1	—
Deportivo Pereira	1–4	—	—	1–1	—	1–2	2–1	1–1	3–0	—	2–2	—	—	—	—	—	2–2
Independiente Medellín	—	4–2	1–0	2–2	—	—	6–1	2–1	1–0	—	—	—	2–0	2–1	—	—	—
Junior	2–2	—	—	—	—	0–1	0–0	0–1	2–0	3–0	2–0	—	—	—	—	—	1–1
La Equidad	—	6–0	3–1	—	0–1	—	—	—	—	1–1	—	2–3	—	3–1	3–1	2–0	—
Llaneros	—	2–1	1–1	—	2–0	1–2	—	—	—	1–2	—	1–0	—	—	2–1	3–0	—
Millonarios	2–1	—	—	—	—	1–0	5–1	—	1–1	1–2	3–1	0–0	—	—	—	—	0–2
Real Santander	2–1	—	—	—	—	1–0	2–1	—	—	0–3	0–1	1–1	—	—	1–4	—	2–2
Santa Fe	0–2	—	—	1–0	—	—	5–0	2–2	5–0	—	2–1	—	1–1	2–0	—	—	—

Source: Dimayor, Soccerway
Legend: Blue = home team win; Yellow = draw; Red = away team win.

== Knockout stage ==
=== Bracket ===
Quarter-finals
6	Independiente Medellín	1	1	2
3	Atlético Nacional	1	3	4
7	Cortuluá	1	1	2
2	Santa Fe	2	7	9
5	Deportivo Cali	1	1	2
4	Deportivo Pereira	1	2	3
8	La Equidad	0	1	1
1	América de Cali	0	4	4

Semi-finals
Atlético Nacional	1	0	1
Santa Fe	1	4	5
Deportivo Pereira	2	0	2
América de Cali	3	4	7

Finals
Santa Fe	2	0	2
América de Cali	0	0	0

=== Quarter-finals ===
Team 1	Agg.	Team 2	1st leg	2nd leg
La Equidad	1–4	América de Cali	0–0	1–4
Cortuluá	2–9	Santa Fe	1–2	1–7
Independiente Medellín	2–4	Atlético Nacional	1–1	1–3
Deportivo Cali	2–3	Deportivo Pereira	1–1	1–2

==== First leg ====
29 May 2023	Cortuluá	1–2	Santa Fe	Yumbo
16:00 UTC−5	Carvajal 79' (pen.)	Report	Mosquera 34'; Salazar 52' (pen.)	Stadium: Municipal Raúl Miranda; Referee: Yeimi Martínez

29 May 2023	Deportivo Cali	1–1	Deportivo Pereira	Palmira
18:00 UTC−5	Medina 90+6'	Report	A. González 57' (pen.)	Stadium: Deportivo Cali; Referee: Manuela Vásquez

29 May 2023	La Equidad	0–0	América de Cali	Bogotá
19:00 UTC−5		Report		Stadium: Metropolitano de Techo; Referee: Vanessa Ceballos

29 May 2023	Independiente Medellín	1–1	Atlético Nacional	Itagüí
19:30 UTC−5	Infante 45+5'	Report	Montoya 12'	Stadium: Metropolitano Ciudad de Itagüí; Referee: Erika Sánchez

==== Second leg ====
5 June 2023	Atlético Nacional	3–1 (4–2 agg.)	Independiente Medellín	Medellín
19:00 UTC−5	S. Córdoba 29'; Aguirre 39' (pen.); Quejada 85'	Report	Restrepo 87'	Stadium: Atanasio Girardot; Referee: Viviana Muñoz

5 June 2023	América de Cali	4–1 (4–1 agg.)	La Equidad	Cali
19:30 UTC−5	Usme 39', 58', 67'; Muñoz 81'	Report	Cabrera 90+2'	Stadium: Pascual Guerrero; Referee: María Victoria Daza

5 June 2023	Santa Fe	7–1 (9–2 agg.)	Cortuluá	Bogotá
19:30 UTC−5	Reyes 10', 78'; Mosquera 30', 44'; Salazar 42'; Viancha 48'; Higuera 85'	Report	Urrutia 61'	Stadium: El Campín; Referee: Danna Victorino

5 June 2023	Deportivo Pereira	2–1 (3–2 agg.)	Deportivo Cali	Pereira
19:30 UTC−5	Romero 37' (o.g.); Villegas 88'	Report	Pino 5'	Stadium: Hernán Ramírez Villegas; Referee: Yessica Villadiego

=== Semi-finals ===
Team 1	Agg.	Team 2	1st leg	2nd leg
Deportivo Pereira	2–7	América de Cali	2–3	0–4
Atlético Nacional	1–5	Santa Fe	1–1	0–4

==== First leg ====
9 June 2023	Deportivo Pereira	2–3	América de Cali	Pereira
18:00 UTC−5	Rojas 43'; González 49'	Report	Vidal 7'; Zamorano 65'; Castellanos 90+3'	Stadium: Hernán Ramírez Villegas; Referee: Paula Fernández

9 June 2023	Atlético Nacional	1–1	Santa Fe	Medellín
20:05 UTC−5	S. Córdoba 2'	Report	Reyes 34'	Stadium: Atanasio Girardot; Referee: Erika Sánchez

==== Second leg ====
14 June 2023	Santa Fe	4–0 (5–1 agg.)	Atlético Nacional	Bogotá
18:00 UTC−5	Salazar 12' (pen.), 43' (pen.); Robayo 54'; García 57'	Report		Stadium: El Campín; Referee: María Victoria Daza

14 June 2023	América de Cali	4–0 (7–2 agg.)	Deportivo Pereira	Cali
20:15 UTC−5	Muñoz 4'; Usme 39'; Castellanos 46'; Ospina 58'	Report		Stadium: Pascual Guerrero; Referee: Yessica Villadiego

=== Finals ===
25 June 2023
16:00 UTC−5

Santa Fe	2–0	América de Cali
Viancha 26'; Reyes 82'	Report

Estadio El Campín, Bogotá
Attendance: 30,747
Referee: Danna Victorino

30 June 2023
20:00 UTC−5

América de Cali	0–0	Santa Fe
	Report

Estadio Pascual Guerrero, Cali
Referee: María Victoria Daza

Santa Fe won 2–0 on aggregate.

Liga Femenina BetPlay DIMAYOR
2023 champions

3rd title

== Aggregate table ==
Pos	Team	Pld	W	D	L	GF	GA	GD	Pts	Qualification
1	América de Cali	22	16	3	3	54	13	+41	51	Qualification for Copa Libertadores Femenina
2	Santa Fe (C)	22	14	7	1	49	15	+34	49	Qualification for Copa Libertadores Femenina
3	Atlético Nacional	20	9	8	3	33	16	+17	35	Qualification for Copa Libertadores Femenina
4	Deportivo Pereira	20	9	6	5	33	29	+4	33	
5	Deportivo Cali	18	7	7	4	26	21	+5	28	
6	Independiente Medellín	18	8	4	6	27	24	+3	28	
7	Cortuluá	18	7	4	7	22	22	0	25	
8	La Equidad	18	7	3	8	29	24	+5	24	
9	Millonarios	16	6	4	6	23	21	+2	22	
10	Llaneros	16	7	1	8	21	23	−2	22	
11	Junior	16	5	6	5	17	12	+5	21	
12	Boyacá Chicó	16	4	8	4	13	15	−2	20	
13	Atlético Huila	16	5	5	6	15	21	−6	20	
14	Real Santander	16	3	4	9	13	29	−16	13	
15	Deportivo Pasto	16	3	3	10	11	34	−23	12	
16	Atlético Bucaramanga	16	1	3	12	9	41	−32	6	
17	Deportes Tolima	16	0	2	14	11	46	−35	2	

Source: Fémina Fútbol
Rules for classification: 1) Points, 2) Goal difference, 3) Goals for, 4) Away goals for, 5) Away goals against, 6) Drawing of lots.
(C) Champions

== Top scorers ==
Rank	Name	Club	Goals
1	(Colombia) Catalina Usme	América de Cali	11
2	(Colombia) Liana Salazar	Santa Fe	10
2	(Colombia) María Camila Reyes	Santa Fe	10
4	(Colombia) Lorena Cobos	Llaneros	9
4	(Colombia) Daniela Montoya	Atlético Nacional	9
6	(Colombia) Manuela González	Deportivo Cali	8
6	(Colombia) Ana Milé González	Deportivo Pereira	8
6	(Colombia) Yessica Rodríguez	La Equidad	8
9	(Colombia) Mariana Zamorano	América de Cali	7
9	(Colombia) Karla Viancha	Santa Fe	7
9	(Colombia) Sara Córdoba	Atlético Nacional	7

Source: Fémina Fútbol

== See also ==
- Colombian Women's Football League
