= Vanessa Córdoba =

Colombian footballer

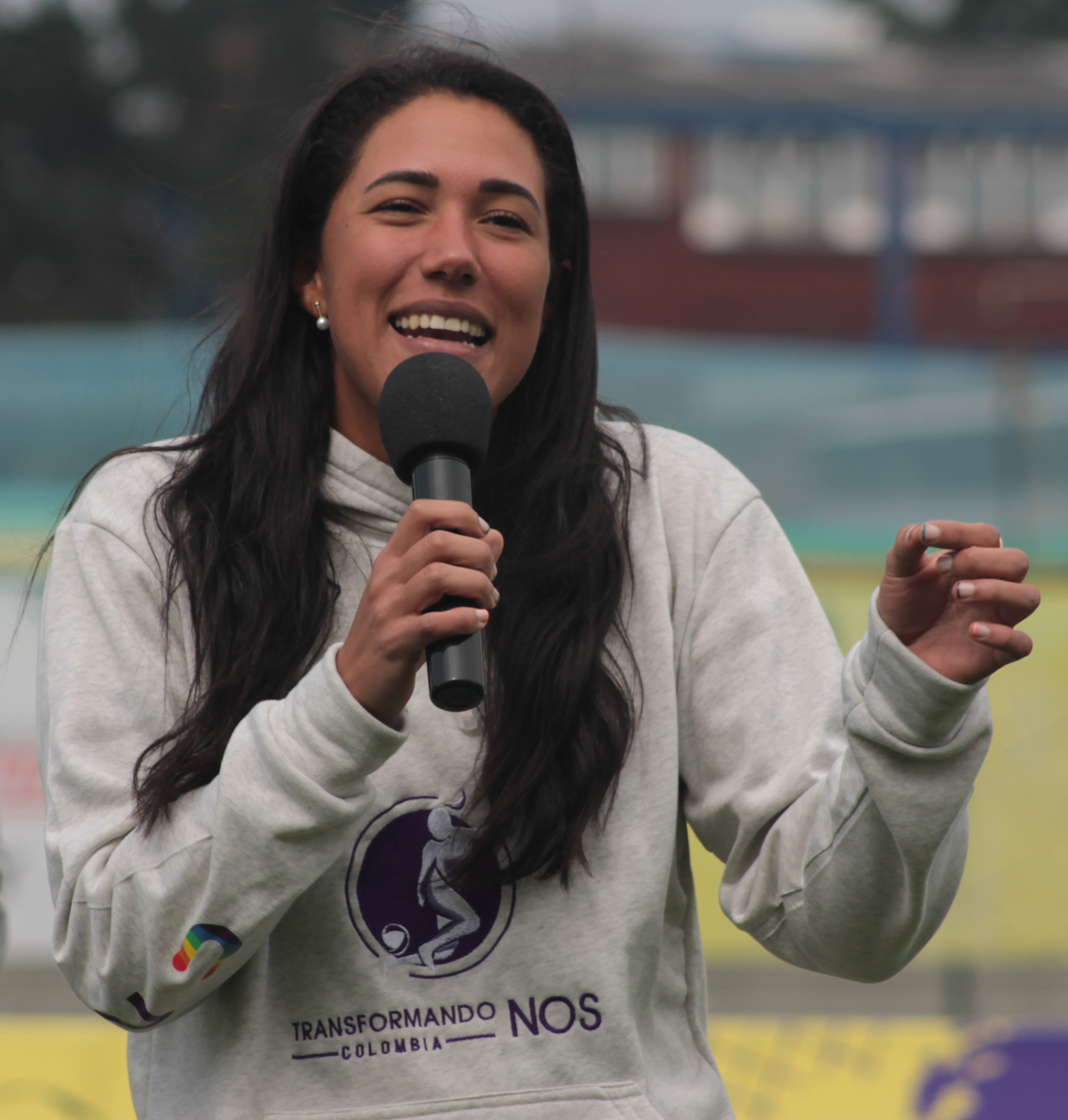
- Córdoba in 2022

Personal information
- Full name: Vanessa Córdoba Arteaga
- Date of birth: 9 May 1995 (age 31)
- Place of birth: Cali, Colombia
- Height: 1.75 m (5 ft 9 in)
- Position: Goalkeeper

Team information
- Current team: Beşiktaş
- Number: 35

College career
Years	Team	Apps	(Gls)
2014	NYIT Bears	14	(0)
2015–2016	Ohio Bobcats	8	(0)

Senior career*
Years	Team	Apps	(Gls)
2017–2018	Independiente Santa Fe		
2018	Fundación Albacete	2	(0)
2018–2020	La Equidad		
2021–2022	Querétaro	30	(0)
2022	Deportivo Cali		
2023–2024	Atlético Nacional		
2024–	Beşiktaş		
- * Club domestic league appearances and goals

Vanessa Córdoba Arteaga (born 9 May 1995) is a Colombian professional footballer who plays as a goalkeeper for Beşiktaş.

== Early career ==
Córdoba was born in Cali, Colombia on 9 May 1995, but spent most of childhood outside Colombia, due to his father's career, Colombian international goalkeeper Óscar Córdoba. Before committing full time to football, Córdoba practiced horse riding and beach volleyball.

Córdoba played for the Ohio Bobcats during her time as a college student in the Ohio University, where she majored in communication. Córdoba played in eight games from 2015 to 2016. She also studied at the New York Institute of Technology and played for the NYIT Bears.

== Professional career ==
=== Independiente Santa Fe (2017–2018) ===
In September 2017, Córdoba joined Independiente Santa Fe of the Colombian Women's Football League.

=== Fundación Albacete (2018) ===
In August 2018, Córdoba was signed by Fundación Albacete of the Liga Femenina Iberdrola. She appeared in two league matches and in one Copa de la Reina game. On 2 January 2019 she was released by the club.

=== Querétaro (2021–2022) ===
In July 2021, Córdoba joined Liga MX Femenil club Querétaro and became the first foreign player to appear in a Liga MX Femenil match on 16 July 2021, when Querétaro faced Monterrey in the Estadio Corregidora. Córdoba made 30 appearances with Querétaro during the 2021–22 season.

=== Atlético Nacional (2023–2024) ===
In January 2023, Córdoba was signed by Atlético Nacional.

== Personal life ==
Córdoba is an activist for gender equality and better conditions for female football players.
