= Sara Martínez (footballer) =

Colombian footballer (born 2001)

Personal information
- Full name: Sara Sofía Martínez Restrepo
- Date of birth: 2 January 2001 (age 25)
- Place of birth: Rionegro, Colombia
- Height: 1.60 m (5 ft 3 in)
- Position: Midfielder

Team information
- Current team: Atlético Nacional
- Number: 7

Senior career*
Years	Team	Apps	(Gls)
2018	Formas Íntimas		
2019–2020	Independiente Medellín		
2021–2023	América de Cali	52	(3)
2021	→ Alianza Lima (loan)		
2025–	Atlético Nacional		

International career^{‡}
2018	Colombia U17	4	(0)
2018	Colombia U18	1	(0)
2022	Colombia U20	4	(0)
2019–	Colombia	4	(1)
Medal record
Women's football
Representing Colombia
Central American and Caribbean Games
Silver medal – second place	2026 Santo Domingo	Team
- * Club domestic league appearances and goals ‡ National team caps and goals as of 30 November 2024

Sara Sofía Martínez Restrepo (born 22 January 2001) is a Colombian professional footballer who plays as a midfielder for Colombian Women's Football League club Atlético Nacional and the Colombia national team.

== Club career ==
Martínez was born in Rionegro in the department of Antioquia. She started out with Formas Íntimas and Independiente Medellín before joining América de Cali in 2021. In November 2021, she went on loan to Peruvian club Alianza Lima and started all four games for the club in the 2021 Copa Libertadores Femenina.

In her second year with América, Martínez started 21 games in the Colombian Women's Football League as the club won the 2022 league championship. She also started all six games of the 2022 Copa Libertadores Femenina, helping them finish in third place.

Martínez made 22 appearances in the 2023 season, helping América top the standings in the first stage but falling short in the playoff finals. She tore her ACL days before the quarterfinals of the 2023 Copa Libertadores Femenina.

In January 2025, Martínez joined Atlético Nacional.

== International career ==
Martínez played for the Colombian youth national team at the 2018 FIFA U-17 Women's World Cup and the 2020 South American Under-20 Women's Football Championship. She made her senior debut and scored her first international goal on 12 November 2019, scoring Colombia's second goal in a 2–2 friendly draw against Argentina.
