= Stefany Castaño =

Colombian footballer (born 1994)

Personal information
- Full name: Derly Stefany Castaño Cardozo
- Date of birth: 11 January 1994 (age 32)
- Place of birth: Bogotá, Colombia
- Height: 1.72 m (5 ft 8 in)
- Position: Goalkeeper

Team information
- Current team: Atlético Nacional
- Number: 22

Youth career
- Politécnico Talentos Illinois

College career
Years	Team	Apps	(Gls)
2010–2013	Graceland Yellowjackets		

Senior career*
Years	Team	Apps	(Gls)
2016	Elpides Karditsas		
2017	Houston Aces		
2017	Elpides Karditsas		
2018	Patriotas		
2018–2019	Málaga	0	(0)
2019	Santa Fe		
2020–2011	Colo-Colo		
2022	Deportivo Cali	13	(0)
2023	Santa Fe		
2024	Atlético Mineiro	7	(0)
2025-	Atlético Nacional		

International career^{‡}
2008	Colombia U17		
2012–	Colombia	9	(0)
Medal record
Women's football
Representing Colombia
Pan American Games
Gold medal – first place	2019 Lima	Team
- * Club domestic league appearances and goals as of 16 March 2024 ‡ National team caps and goals as of 23:03, 23 June 2015 (UTC)

Derly Stefany Castaño Cardozo (born 11 January 1994) is a Colombian professional footballer who plays as a goalkeeper for Atlético Nacional and the Colombia women's national team.

== International career ==
Castaño was part of the Colombia squad for the 2012 Summer Olympics, in which she did not make an appearance, and the 2015 FIFA Women's World Cup, in which she played in two of Colombia's four matches and conceded three goals.
