= 2022 Copa Libertadores Femenina =

11th edition of the CONMEBOL Libertadores Femenina

Tournament details
- Host country: Ecuador
- City: Quito
- Dates: 13–28 October 2022
- Teams: 16 (from 10 associations)
- Venues: 3 (in 1 host city)

Final positions
- Champions: (Brazil) Palmeiras (1st title)
- Runners-up: (Argentina) Boca Juniors
- Third place: (Colombia) América
- Fourth place: (Colombia) Deportivo Cali

Tournament statistics
- Matches played: 32
- Goals scored: 121 (3.78 per match)
- Top scorer: (Paraguay) Rebeca Fernández (5 goals)

The 2022 Copa CONMEBOL Libertadores Femenina was the 14th edition of the CONMEBOL Libertadores Femenina (also referred to as the Copa Libertadores Femenina), South America's premier women's club football tournament organized by CONMEBOL. The tournament was held in Ecuador from 13 to 28 October 2022. Corinthians, the defending champions, were eliminated in the quarter-finals.

Palmeiras (Brazil) defeated Boca Juniors (Argentina) 4–1 in the final to win their first title.

== Format ==
For the group stage, the 16 teams were drawn into four groups. Teams in each group played one another in a round-robin basis, with the top two teams of each group advancing to the quarter-finals. Starting from the quarter-finals, the teams played a single-elimination tournament.

== Teams ==
The 16 teams were:

- the champions of all ten CONMEBOL associations
- the title holders
- an additional team from the host association
- four additional teams from associations with the best historical performance in the tournament (associations in **bold** receive two berths according to the points total until the 2021 edition).
  1. Brazil: 240 points
  2. Chile: 140 points
  3. Colombia: 135 points
  4. Paraguay: 112 points
  5. Argentina: 90 points
  6. Venezuela: 78 points
  7. Ecuador: 62 points
  8. Uruguay: 52 points
  9. Bolivia: 39 points
  10. Peru: 37 points

Association	Team	Qualifying method	Participation	Previous best result
Argentina	Boca Juniors	2021 Campeonato Femenino YPF Clausura champions	7th	Third place (2010)
Bolivia	Always Ready	2022 Copa Simón Bolívar Femenina champions	1st	—
Brazil	Corinthians (Brazil 1)	2021 Copa Libertadores Femenina champions	5th (Note: Corinthians won the 2017 title as a partnership with Audax. They created their own team for the 2018 season.)	**Champions** (2017, 2019, 2021)
Brazil	Palmeiras (Brazil 2)	2021 Brasileirão Feminino Neonergia runners-up (Note: As the title holders, Corinthians, were also the 2021 Brasileirão Feminino Neonergia champions, runners-up Palmeiras and third place Ferroviária qualified as Brazil 2 and Brazil 3 berths, respectively.)	1st	—
Brazil	Ferroviária (Brazil 3)	2021 Brasileirão Feminino Neonergia third place	6th	**Champions** (2015, 2020)
Chile	Universidad de Chile (Chile 1)	2021 Campeonato Femenino Caja Los Andes champions	3rd	Fourth place (2020)
Chile	Santiago Morning (Chile 2)	2022 Copa Libertadores Femenina qualifying play-off winners (Note: The qualifying play-off was played on 13 September 2022 at Estadio Municipal Nicolás Chahuán Nazar, La Calera between Santiago Morning (2021 Campeonato runners-up and 2022 Campeonato first stage winners) and Colo-Colo (2022 Campeonato first stage runners-up).)	4th	Quarter-finals (2019, 2020)
Colombia	América (Colombia 1)	2022 Liga Femenina BetPlay DIMAYOR champions	3rd	Runners-up (2020)
Colombia	Deportivo Cali (Colombia 2)	2022 Liga Femenina BetPlay DIMAYOR runners-up	2nd	Quarter-finals (2021)
Ecuador (hosts)	Ñañas (Ecuador 1)	2022 Superliga Femenina DirecTV champions	2nd	Group stage (2019)
Ecuador (hosts)	Dragonas IDV (Ecuador 2)	2022 Superliga Femenina DirecTV runners-up (Host association additional entry)	1st	—
Paraguay	Olimpia (Paraguay 1)	2022 Torneo Femenino champions	1st	—
Paraguay	Libertad/Limpeño (Paraguay 2)	2022 Torneo Femenino runners-up	5th (Note: Sportivo Limpeño won the 2016 title. In 2018 they started a partnership with Libertad (3rd participation).)	**Champions** (2016)
Peru	Alianza Lima	2022 Liga Femenina Pluspetrol champions	2nd	Quarter-finals (2021)
Uruguay	Defensor Sporting	2021 Torneo Rexona de Fútbol Femenino champions	1st	—
Venezuela	Deportivo Lara	2022 Liga FUTVE Fem champions	1st	—

== Venues ==
The matches were played in Quito. Initially two stadiums (Estadio Gonzalo Pozo Ripalda and Estadio Banco Guayaquil) would host the group stage. On 15 October 2022, CONMEBOL announced that the Estádio Banco Guayaquil would no longer host matches, and matches originally to be played there would be moved to Estadio Rodrigo Paz Delgado.

The stadiums were:

- Estadio Gonzalo Pozo Ripalda (capacity: 21,489)
- Estadio Banco Guayaquil (capacity: 12,000)
- Estadio Rodrigo Paz Delgado (capacity: 41,575)

== Match officials ==
On 21 September 2022, CONMEBOL announced the referees and assistant referees appointed for the tournament.

Association	Referees	Assistant referees
Argentina	Laura Fortunato	Mariana de Almeida; Daiana Milone
Bolivia	Adriana Farfán	Liliana Bejarano; Inés Choque
Brazil	Edina Alves Batista	Neuza Back; Leila Moreira
Chile	María Belén Carvajal	Marcia Castillo; Cindy Nahuelcoy
Colombia	Jenny Arias	Mary Blanco; Eliana Ortiz
Ecuador	Marcelly Zambrano	Mónica Amboya; Marianela Ramírez
Italy	Maria Marotta	Tiziana Trasciatti
Paraguay	Helena Cantero	Nancy Fernández; Rossana Salinas
Peru	Milagros Arruela	Vera Yupanqui; Gabriela Moreno
Spain		Silvia Fernández Pérez
Uruguay	Nadia Fuques	Daiana Fernández; Belén Clavijo
Venezuela	Emikar Calderas	Migdalia Rodríguez; Thaity Dugarte

== Draw ==
The draw for the tournament was held on 20 September 2022, 12:00 PYT (UTC−4), at the CONMEBOL Convention Center in Luque, Paraguay. The 16 teams were drawn into four groups of four.

Two teams were directly assigned to the head of groups A and B.

- To Group A: as 2021 Copa Libertadores Femenina champions, Corinthians (Brazil 1)
- To Group B: the champions of the host association, Ñañas (Ecuador 1)

The remaining teams (excluding the four teams from national associations with an extra berth) were seeded into three pots based on the final placement of their national association's club in the previous edition of the tournament, excluding the champions, with the highest two (Brazil 2 and Colombia 1) placed in Pot 1, the next four (Uruguay, Peru, Paraguay 1 and Chile 1) placed in Pot 2 and the lowest four (Ecuador 2, Argentina, Venezuela and Bolivia) in Pot 3. The four additional teams from associations with the best historical performance (Brazil 3, Chile 2, Colombia 2 and Paraguay 2) were seeded into Pot 4. From Pot 1, the first team drawn was placed into group C and the second team drawn placed into group D, both teams assigned to position 1 in their group. From each remaining pot, the first team drawn was placed into Group A, the second team drawn placed into Group B, the third team drawn placed into Group C and the final team drawn placed into Group D, with teams from Pot 2, 3 and 4 assigned to positions 2, 3 and 4 in their group. Teams from the same association could not be drawn into the same group.

Pot 1	Pot 2	Pot 3	Pot 4
(Brazil) Palmeiras; (Colombia) América	(Uruguay) Defensor Sporting; (Peru) Alianza Lima^{[1]}; (Paraguay) Olimpia; Universidad de Chile	(Ecuador) Dragonas IDV^{[1]}; (Argentina) Boca Juniors; (Venezuela) Deportivo Lara^{[1]}; (Bolivia) Always Ready	(Brazil) Ferroviária; (Chile) Santiago Morning; (Colombia) Deportivo Cali; (Paraguay) Libertad/Limpeño

^{1} The draw was held before the identities of Ecuador 1 (Ñañas), Ecuador 2 (Dragonas IDV), Peru (Alianza Lima) and Venezuela (Deportivo Lara) were known.

The draw resulted in the following groups:

Group A
Pos	Team
A1	(Brazil) Corinthians
A2	(Paraguay) Olimpia
A3	(Bolivia) Always Ready
A4	(Colombia) Deportivo Cali

Group B
Pos	Team
B1	(Ecuador) Ñañas
B2	(Uruguay) Defensor Sporting
B3	(Argentina) Boca Juniors
B4	(Brazil) Ferroviária

Group C
Pos	Team
C1	(Brazil) Palmeiras
C2	Universidad de Chile
C3	(Ecuador) Dragonas IDV
C4	(Paraguay) Libertad/Limpeño

Group D
Pos	Team
D1	(Colombia) América
D2	(Peru) Alianza Lima
D3	(Venezuela) Deportivo Lara
D4	(Chile) Santiago Morning

== Group stage ==
In the group stage, the teams were ranked according to points (3 points for a win, 1 point for a draw, 0 points for a loss). If tied on points, tiebreakers would be applied in the following order (Regulations Article 23).

1. Goal difference;
2. Goals scored;
3. Head-to-head result in games between tied teams;
4. Number of red cards;
5. Number of yellow cards;
6. Drawing of lots.

The winners and runners-up of each group advanced to the quarter-finals.

All times are local, ECT (UTC−5).

=== Group A ===
Pos	Team	Pld	W	D	L	GF	GA	GD	Pts	Qualification
1	(Colombia) Deportivo Cali	3	3	0	0	14	3	+11	9	Quarter-finals
2	(Brazil) Corinthians	3	2	0	1	10	2	+8	6	Quarter-finals
3	(Paraguay) Olimpia	3	1	0	2	3	6	−3	3	
4	(Bolivia) Always Ready	3	0	0	3	1	17	−16	0	

Source: CONMEBOL
13 October 2022
15:00

Olimpia (Paraguay)	2–0	(Bolivia) Always Ready
Clenilda 25' (o.g.); Castellano 44'	Report

Estadio Gonzalo Pozo Ripalda, Quito
Referee: Milagros Arruela (Peru)
13 October 2022
17:15

Corinthians (Brazil)	1–2	(Colombia) Deportivo Cali
Victória 24'	Report	Guerra 42'; Ariza 45+1'

Estadio Gonzalo Pozo Ripalda, Quito
Referee: Emikar Calderas (Venezuela)

16 October 2022
15:00

Olimpia (Paraguay)	1–2	(Colombia) Deportivo Cali
Garay López 27' (pen.)	Report	Barbosa 51' (o.g.); Ariza 82'

Estadio Gonzalo Pozo Ripalda, Quito
Referee: María Belén Carvajal (Chile)
16 October 2022
17:15

Always Ready (Bolivia)	0–5	(Brazil) Corinthians
	Report	Gabi Portilho 13', 19'; Adriana 27'; Victória 31' (pen.); Juliete 57'

Estadio Gonzalo Pozo Ripalda, Quito
Referee: Marcelly Zambrano (Ecuador)

19 October 2022
17:15

Corinthians (Brazil)	4–0	(Paraguay) Olimpia
Vázquez 25' (o.g.); Gabi Portilho 73'; Bianca Gomes 89'; Gabi Zanotti 90+1'	Report

Estadio Gonzalo Pozo Ripalda, Quito
Referee: Laura Fortunato (Argentina)
19 October 2022
17:15

Deportivo Cali (Colombia)	10–1	(Bolivia) Always Ready
Ariza 2'; F. Caicedo 4', 29'; Ballón 23' (o.g.); Acosta 24', 51', 55'; González 32'; Guerra 80'; Paví 83'	Report	Clenilda 35'

Estadio Rodrigo Paz Delgado, Quito
Referee: Maria Marotta (Italy)

=== Group B ===
Pos	Team	Pld	W	D	L	GF	GA	GD	Pts	Qualification
1	(Argentina) Boca Juniors	3	2	1	0	8	4	+4	7	Quarter-finals
2	(Brazil) Ferroviária	3	2	1	0	4	2	+2	7	Quarter-finals
3	(Ecuador) Ñañas (H)	3	1	0	2	6	8	−2	3	
4	(Uruguay) Defensor Sporting	3	0	0	3	3	7	−4	0	

Source: CONMEBOL
(H) Hosts
13 October 2022
15:00 (Note: Match suspended in the 16th minute due to rain. It was resumed at 17:10.)

Defensor Sporting (Uruguay)	0–2	(Argentina) Boca Juniors
	Report	Gómez Ares 21'; Ojeda 38'

Estadio Banco Guayaquil, Quito
Referee: Jenny Arias (Colombia)
13 October 2022
19:30

Ñañas (Ecuador)	0–1	(Brazil) Ferroviária
	Report	Laryh 12'

Estadio Banco Guayaquil, Quito
Referee: Adriana Farfán (Bolivia)

16 October 2022
15:00

Boca Juniors (Argentina)	4–2	(Ecuador) Ñañas
Gómez Ares 26', 43'; Córdoba 47' (o.g.); Rodríguez 65'	Report	Pérez 34', 81' (pen.)

Estadio Rodrigo Paz Delgado, Quito
Referee: Emikar Calderas (Venezuela)
16 October 2022
17:15

Defensor Sporting (Uruguay)	0–1	(Brazil) Ferroviária
	Report	Rafa Mineira 53'

Estadio Rodrigo Paz Delgado, Quito
Referee: Maria Marotta (Italy)

19 October 2022
15:00

Ñañas (Ecuador)	4–3	(Uruguay) Defensor Sporting
Pérez 45' (pen.), 68'; Higuera 84', 90+1'	Report	Jara 10'; Oxandabarat 43' (pen.), 63'

Estadio Rodrigo Paz Delgado, Quito
Referee: Helena Cantero (Paraguay)
19 October 2022
15:00

Ferroviária (Brazil)	2–2	(Argentina) Boca Juniors
Carol Tavares 8'; Laryh 90+4'	Report	Rodríguez 72' (pen.), 76'

Estadio Gonzalo Pozo Ripalda, Quito
Referee: María Belén Carvajal (Chile)

=== Group C ===
Pos	Team	Pld	W	D	L	GF	GA	GD	Pts	Qualification
1	(Brazil) Palmeiras	3	3	0	0	12	1	+11	9	Quarter-finals
2	Universidad de Chile	3	2	0	1	10	5	+5	6	Quarter-finals
3	(Ecuador) Dragonas IDV (H)	3	1	0	2	2	10	−8	3	
4	(Paraguay) Libertad/Limpeño	3	0	0	3	2	10	−8	0	

Source: CONMEBOL
(H) Hosts
14 October 2022
15:00

Universidad de Chile	3–1	(Ecuador) Dragonas IDV
Huenteo 15'; Fernández 58'; Zamora 71'	Report	Roldán 18'

Estadio Banco Guayaquil, Quito
Referee: Nadia Fuques (Uruguay)
14 October 2022
17:15 (Note: Match suspended in the 18th minute due to blackout and rain. It was resumed at 18:35.)

Palmeiras (Brazil)	3–0	(Paraguay) Libertad/Limpeño
Duda Santos 24'; Byanca Brasil 52'; Bia Zaneratto 59'	Report

Estadio Banco Guayaquil, Quito
Referee: Laura Fortunato (Argentina)

17 October 2022
15:00

Universidad de Chile	6–2	(Paraguay) Libertad/Limpeño
Fernández 45', 56', 59', 69'; Keefe 49'; Zamora 71'	Report	Fleitas 77'; Peña 85'

Estadio Rodrigo Paz Delgado, Quito
Referee: Jenny Arias (Colombia)
17 October 2022
17:15

Dragonas IDV (Ecuador)	0–7	(Brazil) Palmeiras
	Report	Ary Borges 14'; Andressinha 16', 39'; Byanca Brasil 36'; Bia Zaneratto 41'; Bruna Calderan 67', 86'

Estadio Rodrigo Paz Delgado, Quito
Referee: Milagros Arruela (Peru)

20 October 2022
17:15

Palmeiras (Brazil)	2–1	Universidad de Chile
Carol Baiana 42'; Poliana 71'	Report	Huertas 49' (pen.)

Estadio Rodrigo Paz Delgado, Quito
Referee: Nadia Fuques (Uruguay)
20 October 2022
17:15

Libertad/Limpeño (Paraguay)	0–1	(Ecuador) Dragonas IDV
	Report	Caicedo 88'

Estadio Gonzalo Pozo Ripalda, Quito
Referee: Adriana Farfán (Bolivia)

=== Group D ===
Pos	Team	Pld	W	D	L	GF	GA	GD	Pts	Qualification
1	(Colombia) América	3	3	0	0	11	1	+10	9	Quarter-finals
2	(Chile) Santiago Morning	3	2	0	1	8	1	+7	6	Quarter-finals
3	(Peru) Alianza Lima	3	0	1	2	2	4	−2	1	
4	(Venezuela) Deportivo Lara	3	0	1	2	1	16	−15	1	

Source: CONMEBOL
14 October 2022
15:00

Alianza Lima (Peru)	1–1	(Venezuela) Deportivo Lara
Porras 90+2'	Report	Flórez 26'

Estadio Gonzalo Pozo Ripalda, Quito
Referee: Helena Cantero (Paraguay)
14 October 2022
17:15

América (Colombia)	1–0	(Chile) Santiago Morning
Bonilla 65'	Report

Estadio Gonzalo Pozo Ripalda, Quito
Referee: Edina Alves Batista (Brazil)

17 October 2022
15:00

Deportivo Lara (Venezuela)	0–8	(Colombia) América
	Report	Muñoz 1', 45+1'; Zamorano 27'; Usme 29'; Basanta 44'; Mosquera 59'; Castellanos 72'; Vidal 73'

Estadio Gonzalo Pozo Ripalda, Quito
Referee: Adriana Farfán (Bolivia)
17 October 2022
17:15

Alianza Lima (Peru)	0–1	(Chile) Santiago Morning
	Report	Navarrete 36'

Estadio Gonzalo Pozo Ripalda, Quito
Referee: Nadia Fuques (Uruguay)

20 October 2022
15:00

América (Colombia)	2–1	(Peru) Alianza Lima
Mosquera 17'; Usme 35'	Report	Padilla 32'

Estadio Gonzalo Pozo Ripalda, Quito
Referee: Marcelly Zambrano (Ecuador)
20 October 2022
15:00

Santiago Morning (Chile)	7–0	(Venezuela) Deportivo Lara
Navarrete 14', 42'; Fajre 39'; Celis 44'; Valencia 53', 63', 80'	Report

Estadio Rodrigo Paz Delgado, Quito
Referee: Edina Alves Batista (Brazil)

== Final stages ==
Starting from the quarter-finals, the teams played a single-elimination tournament. If tied after full time, extra time would not be played, and the penalty shoot-out would be used to determine the winners (Regulations Article 25).

=== Bracket ===
Quarter-finals
22 October – Estadio Rodrigo Paz Delgado
(Colombia) Deportivo Cali	2
(Brazil) Ferroviária	1
22 October – Estadio Rodrigo Paz Delgado
(Argentina) Boca Juniors	2
(Brazil) Corinthians	1
23 October – Estadio Rodrigo Paz Delgado
(Brazil) Palmeiras	2
(Chile) Santiago Morning	1
23 October – Estadio Rodrigo Paz Delgado
(Colombia) América (p)	1 (4)
Universidad de Chile	1 (2)

Semi-finals
25 October – Estadio Rodrigo Paz Delgado
(Colombia) Deportivo Cali	1 (0)
(Argentina) Boca Juniors (p)	1 (3)
26 October – Estadio Rodrigo Paz Delgado
(Brazil) Palmeiras	1
(Colombia) América	0

Final
28 October – Estadio Rodrigo Paz Delgado
(Argentina) Boca Juniors	1
(Brazil) Palmeiras	4
Third place
28 October – Estadio Rodrigo Paz Delgado
(Colombia) Deportivo Cali	0
(Colombia) América	5

=== Quarter-finals ===
22 October 2022
17:15

Deportivo Cali (Colombia)	2–1	(Brazil) Ferroviária
Guerra 46'; Bahr 89'	Report	Rafa Mineira 8'

Estadio Rodrigo Paz Delgado, Quito
Referee: Laura Fortunato (Argentina)

22 October 2022
14:30

Boca Juniors (Argentina)	2–1	(Brazil) Corinthians
Núñez 23'; Palomar 75'	Report	Adriana 34'

Estadio Rodrigo Paz Delgado, Quito
Referee: Emikar Calderas (Venezuela)

23 October 2022
17:15

Palmeiras (Brazil)	2–1	(Chile) Santiago Morning
Katrine 83'; Day Silva 90+6'	Report	Acuña 72'

Estadio Rodrigo Paz Delgado, Quito
Referee: Helena Cantero (Paraguay)

23 October 2022
14:30

América (Colombia)	1–1	Universidad de Chile
Fuentes 73' (o.g.)	Report	López 45+2'
Penalties
Usme (penalty scored); Zamorano (penalty missed); Castellanos (penalty scored); Vidal (penalty scored); Pineda (penalty scored)	4–2	(penalty scored) Gutiérrez; (penalty missed) Sánchez; (penalty scored) Keefe; (penalty missed) Pinilla

Estadio Rodrigo Paz Delgado, Quito
Referee: Edina Alves Batista (Brazil)

=== Semi-finals ===
25 October 2022
17:00

Deportivo Cali (Colombia)	1–1	(Argentina) Boca Juniors
Carabalí 42'	Report	Palomar 60'
Penalties
Arias (penalty missed); Carabalí (penalty missed); Guerra (penalty missed)	0–3	(penalty scored) Espíndola; (penalty scored) Sachs; (penalty scored) Palomar

Estadio Rodrigo Paz Delgado, Quito
Referee: Maria Marotta (Italy)

26 October 2022
17:00

Palmeiras (Brazil)	1–0	(Colombia) América
Ary Borges 55'	Report

Estadio Rodrigo Paz Delgado, Quito
Referee: Milagros Arruela (Peru)

=== Third place match ===
28 October 2022
14:00

Deportivo Cali (Colombia)	0–5	(Colombia) América
	Report	Martínez 7'; Ospina 55'; Zamorano 58'; Agudelo 62'; Castellanos 90+1'

Estadio Rodrigo Paz Delgado, Quito
Referee: Laura Fortunato (Argentina)

=== Final ===
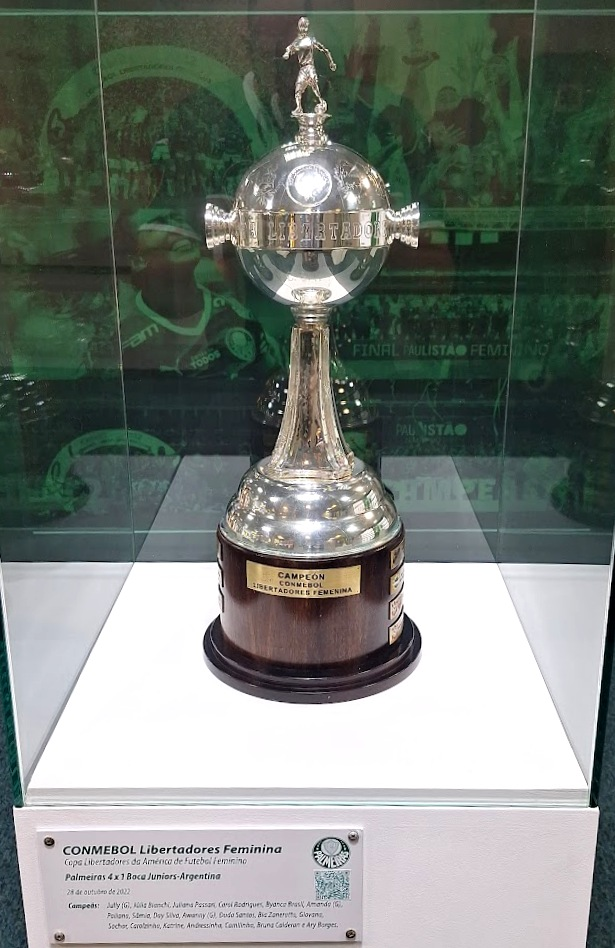
Trophy awarded to the champion Palmeiras

28 October 2022
17:00

Boca Juniors (Argentina)	1–4	(Brazil) Palmeiras
Priori 13'	Report	Ary Borges 5'; Byanca Brasil 49'; Poliana 58'; Bia Zaneratto 89'

Estadio Rodrigo Paz Delgado, Quito
Referee: Emikar Calderas (Venezuela)

Boca Juniors	Palmeiras

GK	1	(Argentina) Laurina Oliveros
DF	4	(Argentina) Julieta Cruz		(substituted off) 69'
DF	15	(Argentina) Adriana Sachs
DF	19	(Argentina) Miriam Mayorga
DF	20	(Argentina) Celeste dos Santos
MF	18	(Argentina) Clarisa Huber		(substituted off) 87'
MF	5	(Argentina) Vanina Preininger
MF	8	(Argentina) Camila Gómez Ares
FW	14	(Argentina) Brisa Priori		(substituted off) 69'
FW	9	(Argentina) Andrea Ojeda		(substituted off) 46'
FW	11	(Argentina) Yamila Rodríguez (c)	(yellow card) 62'
Substitutes:
GK	12	(Argentina) Dulce Tórtolo
DF	2	(Argentina) Noelia Espíndola		(substituted on) 69'
DF	3	(Argentina) Gabriela Barrios
DF	6	(Argentina) Cecilia Ghigo
MF	10	(Argentina) Melanie Morán		(substituted on) 87'
MF	17	(Argentina) Eugenia Flores
FW	7	(Argentina) Amancay Urbani		(substituted on) 69'
FW	13	(Argentina) Estefanía Palomar		(substituted on) 46'
FW	16	(Argentina) Kishi Núñez
Manager:
(Argentina) Jorge Martínez (yellow card) 64'

GK	17	(Brazil) Jully
DF	3	(Brazil) Poliana
DF	5	(Brazil) Julia Bianchi
DF	6	(Brazil) Katrine		(substituted off) 88'
MF	2	(Brazil) Bruna Calderan
MF	20	(Brazil) Andressinha
MF	7	(Brazil) Duda Santos	(yellow card) 31'	(substituted off) 71'
MF	9	(Brazil) Camilinha	(yellow card) 63'	(substituted off) 70'
FW	10	(Brazil) Bia Zaneratto (c)	(yellow card) 76'
FW	8	(Brazil) Ary Borges	(yellow card) 72'
FW	12	(Brazil) Byanca Brasil		(substituted off) 78'
Substitutes:
GK	1	(Brazil) Amanda
GK	14	(Brazil) Awanny
DF	4	(Brazil) Day Silva		(substituted on) 70'
DF	13	(Brazil) Carolzinha
MF	15	(Brazil) Juliana Passari		(substituted on) 88'
MF	18	(Brazil) Sâmia Pryscila
FW	11	(Brazil) Patrícia Sochor		(substituted on) 78'
FW	16	(Brazil) Giovana
FW	19	(Brazil) Carol Baiana		(substituted on) 71'
Manager:
(Brazil) Ricardo Belli

Final MVP Award:
Poliana (Palmeiras)

Assistant referees:
Migdalia Rodríguez (Venezuela)
Thaity Dugarte (Venezuela)
Fourth official:
Marcelly Zambrano (Ecuador)
Video assistant referee:
María Belén Carvajal (Chile)
Assistant video assistant referees:
Mónica Amboya (Ecuador)
Tiziana Trasciatti (Italy)

Match rules

- 90 minutes.
- Penalty shoot-out if scores still level.
- Nine named substitutes.
- Maximum of five substitutions.

== Statistics ==
=== Top goalscorers ===
Rank	Player	Team	Goals
1	(Paraguay) Rebeca Fernández	Universidad de Chile	5
2	(Colombia) Maireth Pérez	(Ecuador) Ñañas	4
3	(Colombia) Viviana Acosta	(Colombia) Deportivo Cali	3
3	(Colombia) Tatiana Ariza	(Colombia) Deportivo Cali	3
3	(Brazil) Ary Borges	(Brazil) Palmeiras	3
3	(Brazil) Bia Zaneratto	(Brazil) Palmeiras	3
3	(Brazil) Byanca Brasil	(Brazil) Palmeiras	3
3	(Brazil) Gabi Portilho	(Brazil) Corinthians	3
3	(Argentina) Camila Gómez Ares	(Argentina) Boca Juniors	3
3	(Colombia) Ingrid Guerra	(Colombia) Deportivo Cali	3
3	(Chile) Valentina Navarrete	(Chile) Santiago Morning	3
3	(Argentina) Yamila Rodríguez	(Argentina) Boca Juniors	3
3	(Chile) Mary Valencia	(Chile) Santiago Morning	3

=== Final ranking ===
As per statistical convention in football, matches decided in extra time were counted as wins and losses, while matches decided by penalty shoot-out were counted as draws.

Pos	Team	Pld	W	D	L	GF	GA	GD	Pts	Final result
1st place, gold medalist(s)	(Brazil) Palmeiras	6	6	0	0	19	3	+16	18	Champions
2nd place, silver medalist(s)	(Argentina) Boca Juniors	6	3	2	1	12	10	+2	11	Runners-up
3rd place, bronze medalist(s)	(Colombia) América	6	4	1	1	17	3	+14	13	Third place
4	(Colombia) Deportivo Cali	6	4	1	1	17	10	+7	13	Fourth place
5	Universidad de Chile	4	2	1	1	11	6	+5	7	Eliminated in Quarter-finals
6	(Brazil) Corinthians	4	2	0	2	11	4	+7	6 (Note: Red cards in quarter-finals: Corinthians 0, Santiago Morning 1, Ferroviária 1; Yellow cards in all matches: Santiago Morning 9, Ferroviária 10)	Eliminated in Quarter-finals
7	(Chile) Santiago Morning	4	2	0	2	9	3	+6	6	Eliminated in Quarter-finals
8	(Brazil) Ferroviária	4	2	1	1	5	4	+1	7	Eliminated in Quarter-finals
9	(Ecuador) Ñañas	3	1	0	2	6	8	−2	3	Eliminated in Group stage
10	(Paraguay) Olimpia	3	1	0	2	3	6	−3	3	Eliminated in Group stage
11	(Ecuador) Dragonas IDV	3	1	0	2	2	10	−8	3	Eliminated in Group stage
12	(Peru) Alianza Lima	3	0	1	2	2	4	−2	1	Eliminated in Group stage
13	(Venezuela) Deportivo Lara	3	0	1	2	1	16	−15	1	Eliminated in Group stage
14	(Uruguay) Defensor Sporting	3	0	0	3	3	7	−4	0	Eliminated in Group stage
15	(Paraguay) Libertad/Limpeño	3	0	0	3	2	10	−8	0	Eliminated in Group stage
16	(Bolivia) Always Ready	3	0	0	3	1	17	−16	0	Eliminated in Group stage

Rules for classification: For 5th to 8th place. 1) Points in Quarter-finals; 2) Goal difference in Quarter-finals; 3) Goals scored in Quarter-finals; 4) Fewest red cards received in Quarter-finals; 5) Fewest yellow cards received in Quarter-finals; 6) Fewest red cards received in all matches; 7) Fewest yellow cards received in all matches.
For 9th to 16th place. 1) Points in group stage; 2) Goal difference; 3) Goals scored; 4) Fewest red cards received; 5) Fewest yellow cards received (Regulations Article 24).

=== 2022 Copa Libertadores Femenina team ===
The 2022 Copa Libertadores Femenina team was a squad consisting of the eleven most impressive players at the tournament.

Pos.	Player	Team
GK	(Colombia) Natalia Giraldo	(Colombia) América de Cali
DF	(Colombia) Carolina Arias	(Colombia) Deportivo Cali
DF	(Colombia) Tatiana Castañeda	(Colombia) América de Cali
DF	(Brazil) Poliana	(Brazil) Palmeiras
DF	(Brazil) Katrine	(Brazil) Palmeiras
MF	(Argentina) Clarisa Huber	(Argentina) Boca Juniors
MF	(Argentina) Camila Gómez Ares	(Argentina) Boca Juniors
MF	(Brazil) Ary Borges	(Brazil) Palmeiras
FW	(Paraguay) Rebeca Fernández	(Chile) Corinthians
FW	(Argentina) Yamila Rodríguez	(Argentina) Boca Juniors
FW	(Brazil) Bia Zaneratto	(Brazil) Palmeiras

== See also ==
- 2021–22 UEFA Women's Champions League
- 2022 Copa Libertadores
