= 2019 Colombian Women's Football League =

Liga Águila Femenina
- Season: 2019
- Dates: 13 July – 30 September 2019
- Champions: América de Cali (1st title)
- Copa Libertadores Femenina: América de Cali; Independiente Medellín
- Matches: 74
- Goals: 170 (2.3 per match)
- Top goalscorer: Linda Caicedo (7 goals)
- Biggest home win: Ind. Medellín 5–0 Atlético Huila (15 September)
- Biggest away win: Once Caldas 0–6 Ind. Medellín (20 July); Atlético 0–6 Cortuluá (9 August)
- Highest scoring: Once Caldas 0–6 Ind. Medellín (20 July); Atlético 0–6 Cortuluá (9 August)

The 2019 Colombian Women's Football League (officially known as the Liga Águila Femenina 2019 for sponsorship reasons) was the third season of Colombia's top-flight women's football league. The season started on 13 July and concluded on 30 September 2019 with the second leg of the finals. América de Cali won their first league title following a 3–2 win on aggregate against Independiente Medellín in the finals. Atlético Huila were the defending champions, but were eliminated by the eventual runners-up Independiente Medellín in the semifinals.

== Format ==
For this season, the league featured 20 teams, which were split into five double round-robin groups of four teams. The top teams in each group as well as the three best runners-up advanced to the quarterfinals, with the winners advancing to the semifinals. The winners of each semifinal qualified for the final to decide the champions. All rounds in the knockout stage were played on a home-and-away basis. The champions qualified for the 2019 Copa Libertadores Femenina, joining Atlético Huila who are already qualified as titleholders. On 15 June 2019, DIMAYOR and the FCF announced an agreement with CONMEBOL for an additional berth for Colombia into the Copa Libertadores Femenina, which was awarded to the league runners-up.

== Teams ==
20 teams took part in the competition. The teams are affiliated with DIMAYOR affiliate clubs. Alianza Petrolera, Bogotá, Deportes Quindío, Envigado, Patriotas, Real Cartagena, and Unión Magdalena did not field a team in this edition, whilst Deportivo Cali, Independiente Medellín, Millonarios, and Once Caldas competed for the first time.

=== Stadia and locations ===
Locations of the 2019 Liga Águila Femenina teams

Group	Team	City	Stadium
A	Atlético Nacional	Medellín; Envigado; Itagüí	Atanasio Girardot; Polideportivo Sur; Metropolitano Ciudad de Itagüí
A	Deportivo Pereira	Pereira	Hernán Ramírez Villegas
A	Independiente Medellín	Medellín; Envigado; Itagüí	Atanasio Girardot; Polideportivo Sur; Metropolitano Ciudad de Itagüí
A	Once Caldas	Manizales	Palogrande
B	Fortaleza	Cota	Municipal de Cota
B	La Equidad	Bogotá	Metropolitano de Techo
B	Millonarios	Bogotá	Nemesio Camacho El Campín
B	Santa Fe	Bogotá	Nemesio Camacho El Campín
C	Atlético Bucaramanga	Bucaramanga	Cancha Marte
C	Cúcuta Deportivo	Cúcuta	General Santander
C	Junior	Barranquilla	Metropolitano Roberto Meléndez
C	Real San Andrés	Floridablanca; Girón	Álvaro Gómez Hurtado; 1 de Mayo
D	América de Cali	Cali	Pascual Guerrero
D	Atlético	Cali	Pascual Guerrero
D	Cortuluá	Tuluá	Doce de Octubre
D	Deportivo Cali	Cali	Deportivo Cali
E	Atlético Huila	Neiva	Guillermo Plazas Alcid
E	Deportes Tolima	Ibagué	Manuel Murillo Toro
E	Deportivo Pasto	Pasto	Cancha San Rafael
E	Orsomarso	Palmira	Francisco Rivera Escobar

== First stage ==
The First stage started on 13 July and consisted of five groups of four teams. It ended on 18 August with the top teams from each group as well as the three best runners-up advancing to the knockout stage.

=== Group A ===
Pos	Team	Pld	W	D	L	GF	GA	GD	Pts	Qualification	DIM	NAC	PER	ONC
1	Independiente Medellín	6	5	1	0	14	1	+13	16	Advance to knockout stage	—	1–0	2–0	1–0
2	Atlético Nacional	6	4	1	1	10	2	+8	13	Advance to knockout stage	0–0	—	2–0	2–0
3	Deportivo Pereira	6	2	0	4	3	11	−8	6		1–4	0–3	—	1–0
4	Once Caldas	6	0	0	6	1	14	−13	0		0–6	1–3	0–1	—

Source: Dimayor
Rules for classification: 1) Points, 2) Goal difference, 3) Goals for, 4) Away goals for, 5) Away goals against, 6) Drawing of lots

=== Group B ===
Pos	Team	Pld	W	D	L	GF	GA	GD	Pts	Qualification	SFE	MIL	EQU	FOR
1	Santa Fe	6	4	1	1	8	3	+5	13	Advance to knockout stage	—	1–1	0–2	2–0
2	Millonarios	6	3	2	1	7	4	+3	11	Advance to knockout stage	0–1	—	2–1	1–0
3	La Equidad	6	3	1	2	9	6	+3	10		0–1	1–1	—	2–1
4	Fortaleza	6	0	0	6	2	13	−11	0		0–3	0–2	1–3	—

Source: Dimayor
Rules for classification: 1) Points, 2) Goal difference, 3) Goals for, 4) Away goals for, 5) Away goals against, 6) Drawing of lots

=== Group C ===
Pos	Team	Pld	W	D	L	GF	GA	GD	Pts	Qualification	JUN	BUC	RSA	CUC
1	Junior	6	3	2	1	5	3	+2	11	Advance to knockout stage	—	0–0	2–0	1–0
2	Atlético Bucaramanga	6	1	4	1	4	3	+1	7		2–0	—	0–0	0–0
3	Real San Andrés	6	1	4	1	5	6	−1	7		1–1	2–2	—	1–1
4	Cúcuta Deportivo	6	1	2	3	2	4	−2	5		0–1	1–0	0–1	—

Source: Dimayor
Rules for classification: 1) Points, 2) Goal difference, 3) Goals for, 4) Away goals for, 5) Away goals against, 6) Drawing of lots

=== Group D ===
Pos	Team	Pld	W	D	L	GF	GA	GD	Pts	Qualification	AME	COR	CAL	ATL
1	América de Cali	6	5	1	0	11	3	+8	16	Advance to knockout stage	—	2–0	3–2	1–0
2	Cortuluá	6	3	1	2	12	6	+6	10	Advance to knockout stage	1–2	—	3–1	1–1
3	Deportivo Cali	6	2	0	4	10	13	−3	6		0–3	0–1	—	4–2
4	Atlético	6	0	2	4	4	15	−11	2		0–0	0–6	1–3	—

Source: Dimayor
Rules for classification: 1) Points, 2) Goal difference, 3) Goals for, 4) Away goals for, 5) Away goals against, 6) Drawing of lots

=== Group E ===
Pos	Team	Pld	W	D	L	GF	GA	GD	Pts	Qualification	HUI	PAS	ORS	TOL
1	Atlético Huila	6	3	3	0	12	4	+8	12	Advance to knockout stage	—	1–1	3–0	4–0
2	Deportivo Pasto	6	1	5	0	5	3	+2	8		1–1	—	2–0	0–0
3	Orsomarso	6	1	3	2	7	10	−3	6		1–1	1–1	—	2–2
4	Deportes Tolima	6	0	3	3	4	11	−7	3		1–2	0–0	1–3	—

Source: Dimayor
Rules for classification: 1) Points, 2) Goal difference, 3) Goals for, 4) Away goals for, 5) Away goals against, 6) Drawing of lots

=== Ranking of second-placed teams ===
The three best teams among those ranked second qualified for the knockout stage.

Pos	Grp	Team	Pld	W	D	L	GF	GA	GD	Pts	Result
1	A	Atlético Nacional	6	4	1	1	10	2	+8	13	Knockout stage
2	B	Millonarios	6	3	2	1	7	4	+3	11	Knockout stage
3	D	Cortuluá	6	3	1	2	12	6	+6	10	Knockout stage
4	E	Deportivo Pasto	6	1	5	0	5	3	+2	8	
5	C	Atlético Bucaramanga	6	1	4	1	4	3	+1	7	

Source: Dimayor
Rules for classification: 1) Points, 2) Goal difference, 3) Goals for, 4) Away goals for, 5) Away goals against, 6) Drawing of lots

== Knockout stage ==
=== Seeding ===
The five group winners were sorted according to their performance in the first stage in order to decide the four teams that were seeded into each of the four quarterfinal ties, which hosted the second leg in that stage. The four best group winners were seeded, while the remaining group winner was drawn along with the three best group runners-up against one of the seeded teams to make up the quarterfinal matchups.

Pos	Grp	Team	Pld	W	D	L	GF	GA	GD	Pts	Result
1	A	Independiente Medellín	6	5	1	0	14	1	+13	16	Quarterfinals Tie 1
2	D	América de Cali	6	5	1	0	11	3	+8	16	Quarterfinals Tie 2
3	B	Santa Fe	6	4	1	1	8	3	+5	13	Quarterfinals Tie 3
4	E	Atlético Huila	6	3	3	0	12	4	+8	12	Quarterfinals Tie 4
5	C	Junior	6	3	2	1	5	3	+2	11	Drawing pot

Source: Dimayor
Rules for classification: 1) Points, 2) Goal difference, 3) Goals for, 4) Away goals for, 5) Away goals against, 6) Drawing of lots

=== Bracket ===
Quarterfinals
Millonarios (p)	1	1	2 (3)
3	Santa Fe	1	1	2 (1)
Atlético Nacional	0	2	2
2	América de Cali	1	2	3
Junior	1	0	1
4	Atlético Huila	3	2	5
Cortuluá	0	1	1
1	Independiente Medellín	0	3	3

Semifinals
Millonarios	0	2	2
América de Cali	2	1	3
Atlético Huila	1	0	1
Independiente Medellín	0	5	5

Finals
América de Cali	2	1	3
Independiente Medellín	0	2	2

=== Quarterfinals ===
Team 1	Agg.	Team 2	1st leg	2nd leg
Cortuluá	1–3	Independiente Medellín	0–0	1–3
Atlético Nacional	2–3	América de Cali	0–1	2–2
Millonarios	2–2 (3–1 p)	Santa Fe	1–1	1–1
Junior	1–5	Atlético Huila	1–3	0–2

=== Semifinals ===
Team 1	Agg.	Team 2	1st leg	2nd leg
Atlético Huila	1–5	Independiente Medellín	1–0	0–5
Millonarios	2–3	América de Cali	0–2	2–1

=== Finals ===
24 September 2019
19:45

América de Cali	2–0	Independiente Medellín
Usme 13'; Pineda 46'	Report

Estadio Pascual Guerrero, Cali
Referee: Jessica Villadiego

30 September 2019
20:00

Independiente Medellín	2–1	América de Cali
Aguirre 23' (pen.); Botero 70'	Report	L. Caicedo 20'

Estadio Atanasio Girardot, Medellín
Attendance: 30,000
Referee: Jenny Arias

América de Cali won 3–2 on aggregate.

Liga Águila Femenina
2019 champions
América de Cali
1st title

== See also ==
- Colombian Women's Football League
