= Catalina Usme =

Colombian footballer (born 1989)

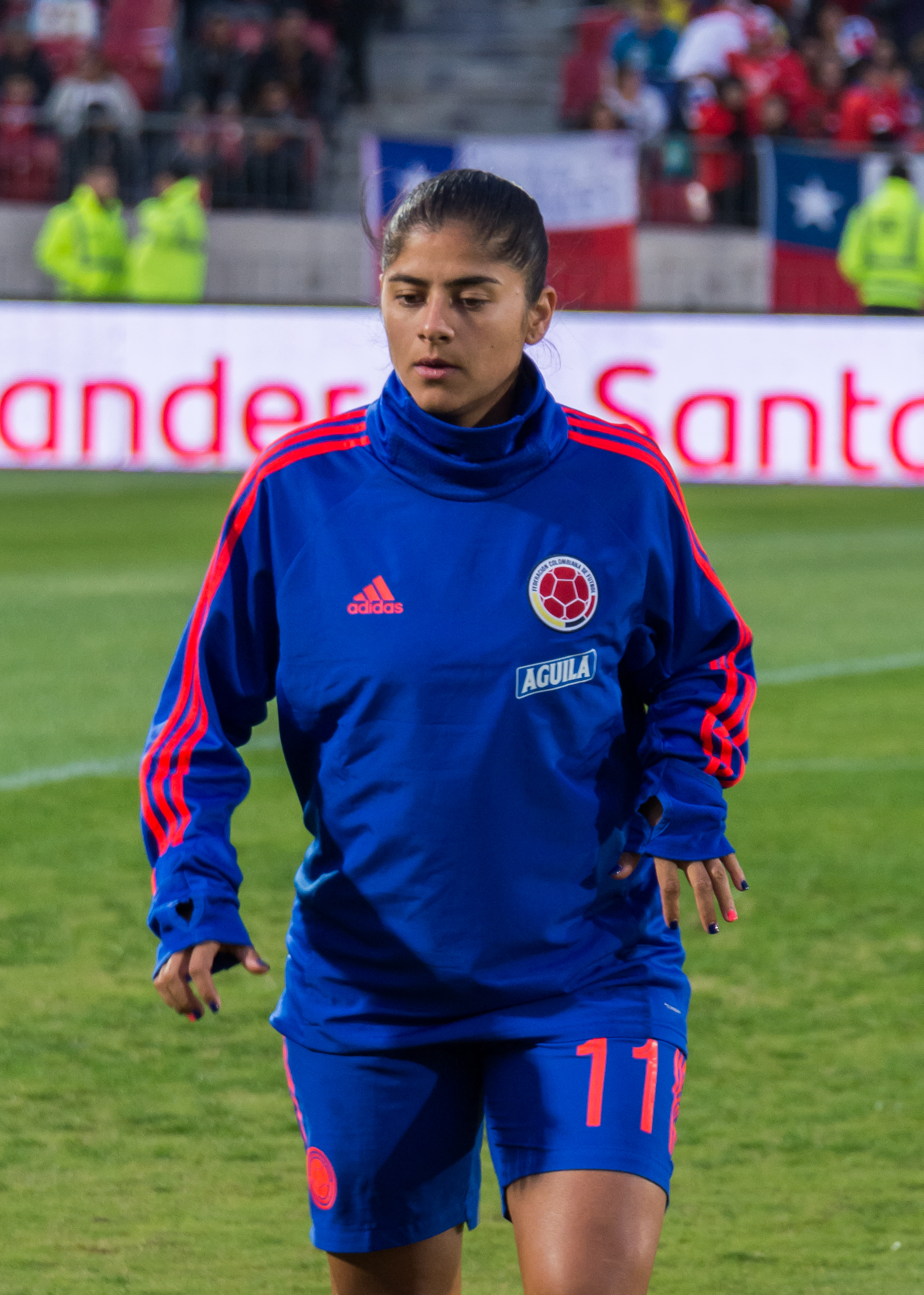
- Usme with Colombia in 2019

Personal information
- Full name: María Catalina Usme Pineda
- Date of birth: 25 December 1989 (age 36)
- Place of birth: Marinilla, Colombia
- Height: 1.66 m (5 ft 5 in)
- Position: Forward

Team information
- Current team: América de Cali
- Number: 10

Senior career*
Years	Team	Apps	(Gls)
2009–2016	Formas Íntimas		
2017	América de Cali		
2017	Santa Fe		
2018–2023	América de Cali	52	(38)
2024	Pachuca	21	(1)
2024–2025	Galatasaray	23	(8)
2025	Universitario	13	(11)
2026–	América de Cali	8	(2)

International career^{‡}
2006–	Colombia	126	(62)
Medal record
Women's football
Representing Colombia
Copa América Femenina
Runner-up	2014 Ecuador
Runner-up	2022 Colombia
Silver medal – second place	2025 Ecuador
Pan American Games
Gold medal – first place	2019 Lima	Team
- * Club domestic league appearances and goals ‡ National team caps and goals as of 29 July 2025

María Catalina Usme Pineda (born 25 December 1989), known as Catalina Usme, is a Colombian footballer who plays as a forward for América de Cali and the Colombia women's national team.

== Club career ==
Usme has played the Copa Libertadores with Formas Íntimas and most recently with America de Cali. In 2015, she won the top-scorer award with eight goals in three matches.

On 23 August 2024, Usme signed a one-year contract with Turkish Super League club Galatasaray.

== International career ==
Usme is a member of the Colombian national team, playing the 2011 and 2015 FIFA Women's World Cups, and the 2012 and 2016 Olympics.

On 14 July 2016, she was called up to the Colombia squad for the 2016 Summer Olympics.

Usme was called up to the Colombia squad for the 2018 Copa América Femenina.

On 3 July 2022, she was called up to the Colombia squad for the 2022 Copa América Femenina, which Colombia finished as runners-up.

On 4 July 2023, she was called up to the Colombia squad for the 2023 FIFA Women's World Cup.

Usme was called up to the Colombia squad for the 2024 CONCACAF W Gold Cup.

On 5 July 2024, she was called up to the Colombia squad for the 2024 Summer Olympics.

== International goals ==
.Scores and results are list Colombia's goal tally first

No.	Date	Venue	Opponent	Score	Result	Competition
1.	16 November 2009	Estadio Olímpico Patria, Sucre, Bolivia	Peru	2–?	3–1	2009 Bolivarian Games
2.	18 November 2009	Estadio Olímpico Patria, Sucre, Bolivia	Venezuela	2–0	2–0	2009 Bolivarian Games
3.	24 November 2009	Estadio Olímpico Patria, Sucre, Bolivia	Bolivia	3–?	4–2	2009 Bolivarian Games
4.	18 September 2010	Estadio Metropolitano de Techo, Bogotá, Colombia	Chile	2–0	2–0	Friendly
5.	5 November 2010	Estadio Federativo Reina del Cisne, Loja, Ecuador	Paraguay	2–0	3–0	2010 South American Women's Football Championship
6.	13 November 2010	Estadio Alejandro Serrano Aguilar, Cuenca, Ecuador	Uruguay	1–0	8–0	2010 South American Women's Football Championship
7.	22 April 2011	Estadio Villa Olímpica, Chía, Colombia	Mexico	1–1	2–3	Friendly
8.	25 October 2011	Estadio Omnilife, Guadalajara, Mexico	Canada	1–1	1–2	2011 Pan American Games
9.	19 March 2015	Estadio General Santander, Cúcuta, Colombia	Venezuela	3–1	3–1	Friendly
10.	11 April 2015	Estadio Olímpico de Tulcán, Tulcán, Ecuador	Ecuador	1–0	4–1	Friendly
11.	31 May 2015	Regency Athletic Complex, Denver, United States	Costa Rica	1–0	2–0	Friendly
12.	31 May 2015	Regency Athletic Complex, Denver, United States	Costa Rica	2–0	2–0	Friendly
13.	13 June 2015	Moncton Stadium, Moncton, Canada	France	2–0	2–0	2015 FIFA Women's World Cup
14.	11 July 2015	Tim Hortons Field, Hamilton, Canada	Mexico	1–0	1–0	2015 Pan American Games
15.	18 July 2015	Tim Hortons Field, Hamilton, Canada	Argentina	2–0	2–0	2015 Pan American Games
16.	25 May 2016	Ciudad Deportiva, Isla de Margarita, Venezuela	Venezuela	1–0	2–0	Friendly
17.	27 May 2016	Ciudad Deportiva, Isla de Margarita, Venezuela	Venezuela	1–0	1–0	Friendly
18.	9 August 2016	Arena da Amazônia, Manaus, Brazil	United States	1–0	2–2	2016 Summer Olympics
19.	9 August 2016	Arena da Amazônia, Manaus, Brazil	United States	2–2	2–2	2016 Summer Olympics
20.	23 November 2017	Estadio General Santander, Cúcuta, Colombia	Venezuela	1–0	2–0	Friendly
21.	23 November 2017	Estadio General Santander, Cúcuta, Colombia	Venezuela	2–0	2–0	Friendly
22.	21 January 2018	Century Lotus Stadium, Foshan, China	Vietnam	2–0	2–0	2018 Four Nations Tournament
23.	4 April 2018	Estadio La Portada, La Serena, Chile	Uruguay	1–0	7–0	2018 Copa América Femenina
24.	4 April 2018	Estadio La Portada, La Serena, Chile	Uruguay	4–0	7–0	2018 Copa América Femenina
25.	4 April 2018	Estadio La Portada, La Serena, Chile	Uruguay	5–0	7–0	2018 Copa América Femenina
26.	4 April 2018	Estadio La Portada, La Serena, Chile	Uruguay	7–0	7–0	2018 Copa América Femenina
27.	6 April 2018	Estadio La Portada, La Serena, Chile	Chile	1–0	1–1	2018 Copa América Femenina
28.	8 April 2018	Estadio La Portada, La Serena, Chile	Paraguay	1–0	5–1	2018 Copa América Femenina
29.	8 April 2018	Estadio La Portada, La Serena, Chile	Paraguay	2–0	5–1	2018 Copa América Femenina
30.	8 April 2018	Estadio La Portada, La Serena, Chile	Paraguay	3–0	5–1	2018 Copa América Femenina
31.	10 April 2018	Estadio La Portada, La Serena, Chile	Peru	1–0	3–0	2018 Copa América Femenina
32.	21 July 2018	Estadio Moderno Julio Torres, Barranquilla, Colombia	Venezuela	1–0	3–2	2018 Central American and Caribbean Games
33.	6 August 2019	Estadio Universidad San Marcos, Lima, Peru	Costa Rica	4–3	4–3 (a.e.t.)	2019 Pan American Games
34.	9 August 2019	Estadio Universidad San Marcos, Lima, Peru	Argentina	1–0	1–1 (a.e.t.) (7–6 p)	2019 Pan American Games
35.	10 April 2021	Estadio Rodrigo Paz Delgado, Quito, Ecuador	Ecuador	1–0	1–0	Friendly
36.	13 April 2021	Estadio Rodrigo Paz Delgado, Quito, Ecuador	Ecuador	1–0	4–0	Friendly
37.	13 April 2021	Estadio Rodrigo Paz Delgado, Quito, Ecuador	Ecuador	2–0	4–0	Friendly
38.	13 April 2021	Estadio Rodrigo Paz Delgado, Quito, Ecuador	Ecuador	3–0	4–0	Friendly
39.	13 April 2021	Estadio Rodrigo Paz Delgado, Quito, Ecuador	Ecuador	4–0	4–0	Friendly
40.	28 November 2021	Estadio Deportivo Cali, Palmira, Colombia	Uruguay	1–0	3–2	Friendly
41.	28 November 2021	Estadio Deportivo Cali, Palmira, Colombia	Uruguay	2–0	3–2	Friendly
42.	20 February 2022	Estadio Olímpico Pascual Guerrero, Cali, Colombia	Argentina	1–1	2–2	Friendly
43.	20 July 2022	Estadio Centenario, Armenia, Colombia	Chile	1–0	4–0	2022 Copa América Femenina
44.	3 September 2022	Estadio Deportivo Cali, Cali, Colombia	Costa Rica	1–0	1–0	Friendly
45.	6 September 2022	Estadio Olímpico Pascual Guerrero, Cali, Colombia	Costa Rica	1–0	2–0	Friendly
46.	21 February 2023	Estadio León, León, Mexico	Mexico	1–0	1–1	2023 Women's Revelations Cup
47.	7 April 2023	Stade Gabriel Montpied, Clermont-Ferrand, France	France	2–0	2–5	Friendly
48.	11 April 2023	Stadio Tre Fontane, Rome, Italy	Italy	1–1	1–2	Friendly
49.	17 June 2023	Estadio Rommel Fernández, Panama City, Panama	Panama	1–0	2–0	Friendly
50.	21 June 2023	Estadio Olímpico Pascual Guerrero, Cali, Colombia	Panama	1–0	1–1	Friendly
51.	24 July 2023	Sydney Football Stadium, Sydney, Australia	South Korea	1–0	2–0	2023 FIFA Women's World Cup
52.	8 August 2023	Melbourne Rectangular Stadium, Melbourne, Australia	Jamaica	1–0	1–0	2023 FIFA Women's World Cup
53.	21 February 2024	Snapdragon Stadium, San Diego, United States	Panama	3–0	6–0	2024 CONCACAF W Gold Cup
54.	27 February 2024	Snapdragon Stadium, San Diego, United States	Puerto Rico	1–0	2–0	2024 CONCACAF W Gold Cup
55.	6 April 2024	Inter&Co Stadium, Orlando, United States	Mexico	1–0	1–0	Friendly
56.	9 April 2024	Hinchliffe Stadium, Paterson, United States	Guatemala	3–0	3–0	Friendly
57.	2 June 2024	Estadio Metropolitano de Lara, Barquisimeto, Venezuela	Venezuela	1–0	3–0	Friendly
58.	25 July 2024	Stade de Lyon, Décines-Charpieu, France	France	1–3	2–3	2024 Summer Olympics
59.	26 October 2024	Estádio Kléber Andrade, Cariacica, Brazil	Brazil	1–0	1–1	Friendly
60.	30 November 2024	Beyond Bancard Field, Davie, United States	Argentina	1–1	1–1 (4–5 p)	Friendly
61.	26 February 2025	Snapdragon Stadium, San Diego, United States	Australia	2–1	2–1	2025 SheBelieves Cup
62.	30 May 2025	Incheon Namdong Asiad Rugby Field, Incheon, South Korea	South Korea	1–0	1–0	Friendly

== Honours ==
América de Cali

- Colombian Women's Football League: 2019, 2022

Individual

- Copa Libertadores Femenina top scorer: 2015, 2017
- Copa América Femenina top scorer: 2018
- Colombian Women's Football League top scorer: 2021, 2022, 2023
- Copa América Femenina Best XI: 2022

== See also ==
- List of women's footballers with 100 or more international caps
