= Natalia Giraldo =

Colombian footballer (born 2003)

Personal information
- Full name: Natalia Giraldo Alzate
- Date of birth: 19 May 2003 (age 23)
- Place of birth: Pensilvania, Caldas, Colombia
- Height: 1.67 m (5 ft 6 in)
- Position: Goalkeeper

Team information
- Current team: América de Cali
- Number: 1

Senior career*
Years	Team	Apps	(Gls)
2019-	América de Cali	31	(0)

International career^{‡}
2020–2022	Colombia U-20	15	(0)
2022–	Colombia	3	(0)
Medal record
Women's football
Representing Colombia
Copa América Femenina
Runner-up	2022 Colombia
Central American and Caribbean Games
Silver medal – second place	2026 Santo Domingo	Team
Bolivarian Games
Gold medal – first place	2022 Valledupar	Team
- * Club domestic league appearances and goals as of 2 April 2023 ‡ National team caps and goals as of 11 April 2023

Natalia Giraldo Alzate (born 19 May 2003) is a Colombian professional footballer who plays as a goalkeeper for América de Cali and the Colombia women's national team.

== International career ==
Giraldo has played matches for the U20 and senior team. As part of the U-20 squad, she competed in the Bolivarian Games and was part of that team that won the gold medal.

Giraldo made her debut with the Colombian senior team on 9 November 2019 against Argentina in a friendly match. On 3 July 2022, she was called up by Nelson Abadía to represent Colombia at the 2022 Copa América Femenina. On 4 July 2023, she was added to Colombia's 2023 FIFA Women's World Cup squad.

== Honours ==
América de Cali

- Liga Femenina Profesional: 2019, 2022

Colombia

- Copa América Femenina runner-up: 2022

Colombia U-20

- Bolivarian Games gold medal: 2022
