= Orsomarso =

- Comune
- Comune di Orsomarso
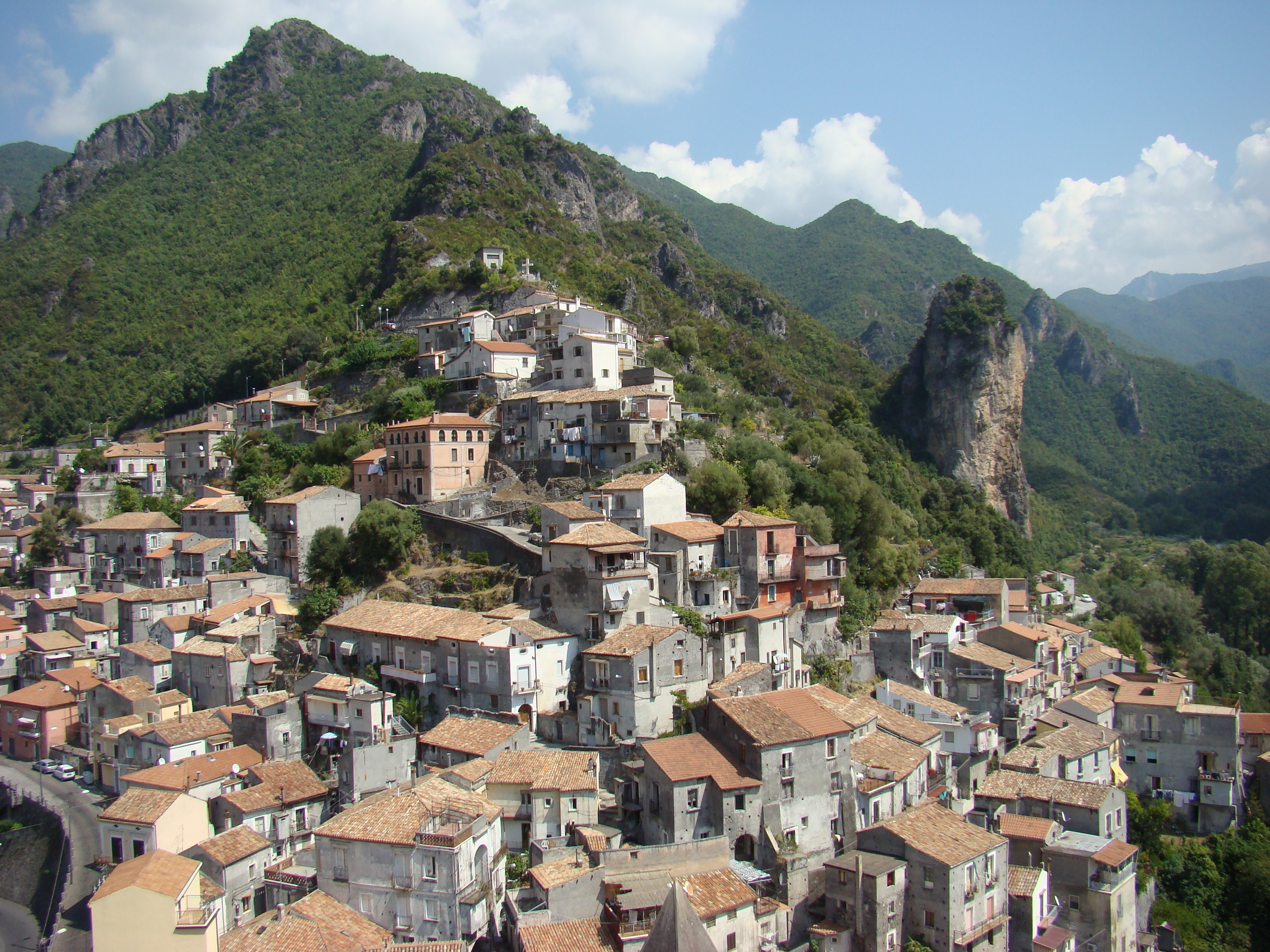

- Location within Italy Location within Calabria
- Coordinates: 39°48′N 15°55′E
- Country: Italy
- Region: Calabria
- Province: Cosenza (CS)
- Frazioni: Bonicose, Buonangelo, Castiglione, Marina di Orsomarso, Molina, Scorpari, Vallementa

Government
  - Mayor: Antonio De Caprio

Area
  - Total: 90.41 km^{2} (34.91 sq mi)
- Elevation: 120 m (390 ft)

Population (2007)
  - Total: 1,412
  - Density: 15.62/km^{2} (40.45/sq mi)
- Demonym: Orsomarsesi
- Time zone: UTC+1 (CET)
  - Summer (DST): UTC+2 (CEST)
- Postal code: 87020
- Dialing code: 0985
- Website: Official website

Orsomarso (Calabrian: Ursumàrzu) is a town and comune in the province of Cosenza in the Calabria region of southern Italy. Colombian Categoría Primera B football club Orsomarso S.C. was named after the town.
