= América de Cali (women) =

América de Cali Femenino
- Nicknames: Las Diablas Rojas (The Red Devils); Las Escarlatas (The Scarlets)
- Founded: 15 September 2016; 9 years ago
- Ground: Pascual Guerrero
- Capacity: 38,000
- Chairman: Marcela Gómez
- Manager: Andrés Usme
- League: Colombian Women's Football League
- 2025: Women's League, 6th of 16
- Website: www.americadecali.co
Home colours	Away colours	Third colours

América de Cali Femenino, commonly known as América Femenino, is the women's association football section of América de Cali based in the city of Cali, Colombia. They participate in Liga Profesional Femenina, the highest category of women's football, organized by Dimayor. Like their male counterpart, they play their home games at the Estadio Olímpico Pascual Guerrero.

== History ==
The team was officially presented on 15 September 2016 in Cali, along with its first two signings, players Catalina Usme and Nicole Regnier. Marcela Gómez, daughter of the club's main shareholder Tulio Gómez, was in charge of the idea of creating a women's team linked to América; she would become the first president of the women's team. Thus, América would be linked to the project of promoting women's football in the country, both at the continental and world level.

América Femenino was a founder club of the Colombian Women's Football League, entering the competition since its first edition held in 2017. In their first match in the competition, they lost 2–0 to Orsomarso at Estadio Francisco Rivera Escobar in Palmira. The team, managed by Gerardo Londoño in the early rounds of the league and later by Enrique Guevara, managed to qualify for the knockout stages of the championship, being defeated by the eventual champions Santa Fe in the quarter-finals. Former men's team player Jersson González was appointed as manager for the following season, in which they reached the semi-finals, losing to Atlético Huila 5–1 on aggregate.

Andrés Usme was signed as manager for the 2019 season, in which América qualified for the knockout stages without much trouble, and reached the final series for the first time after defeating Atlético Nacional in the quarter-finals and Millonarios in the semi-finals. In the finals, they played against Independiente Medellín, whom they defeated 3–2 on aggregate to win their first league title. Along with team captain Catalina Usme, goalkeeper Natalia Giraldo, midfielder Carolina Pineda, and striker Linda Caicedo were among the most outstanding players América featured in this campaign. Caicedo, being 14 years old at the time, was the league's top scorer with 6 goals. The title in the Women's League allowed América de Cali to take part in the 2019 Copa Libertadores Femenina held in Ecuador, in which they placed third.

In the 2020 Colombian Women's Football League, América advanced to the knockout stages after topping their group with 15 out of 18 points, only losing one match against crosstown rivals Deportivo Cali. After defeating Atlético Nacional and Millonarios in successive order just like in the previous season, they faced Santa Fe in the finals, losing both matches to end up as league runners-up. Nevertheless, they returned to the Copa Libertadores Femenina, in which they were drawn in Group A along with the defending champions Corinthians, El Nacional from Ecuador and Peruvian side Universitario. América advanced as group runners-up after thrashing both El Nacional and Universitario and losing 3–0 to Corinthians, and in the knockout stages they defeated Argentine side Boca Juniors in the quarter-finals and Corinthians in the semi-finals before losing 2–1 to Brazilian team Ferroviária in the final.

After failing to advance out of the first stage of the league for the first time in 2021, they reached the final of the league in 2022, defeating Deportivo Cali in the two-legged final to claim their second league title. They once again took part in the Copa Libertadores Femenina in which they won all their group stage matches and reached the semi-finals where they were beaten by Palmeiras and later claimed another third place finish in the competition with a 5–0 win over Deportivo Cali. Shortly after the end of the Copa Libertadores Femenina, manager Andrés Usme announced his departure from the team. Usme was replaced by Carlos Hernández for the 2023 season, in which América once again reached the domestic league finals, losing the double-legged series to Santa Fe.

== Current squad ==
As of 7 September 2026

Note: Flags indicate national team as defined under FIFA eligibility rules; some limited exceptions apply. Players may hold more than one non-FIFA nationality.

No.	Pos.	Nation	Player
1	GK	COL	Natalia Giraldo
2	DF	COL	Zarhay González
3	DF	COL	Laura Orozco
4	MF	COL	Diana Ospina
5	DF	COL	Tatiana Castañeda
6	MF	COL	Mariana Muñoz
7	FW	VEN	Génesis Flórez
8	DF	COL	Nayeli Chará
9	FW	COL	Obeida Mendoza
10	FW	COL	Catalina Usme (captain)
12	GK	COL	Saray Marín
16	MF	VEN	Leury Basanta

No.	Pos.	Nation	Player
17	DF	COL	Carolina Arias
18	MF	COL	Stefanía Santos
20	MF	COL	Isabella Chanchi
24	MF	COL	Mariana Hernández
25	FW	COL	María Paula Córdoba
26	DF	COL	Sofía Ortiz
27	FW	COL	Catalina Cortés
28	DF	COL	Luisa Beltrán
29	FW	COL	Lauren Chamorro
30	MF	COL	Maira Neira
32	MF	COL	Juanita Parga
33	FW	COL	Maura Henao

== Honours ==
- Liga Femenina Profesional:

Winners (2): 2019, 2022
Runners-up (2): 2020, 2023

- Copa Libertadores Femenina:

Runners-up (1): 2020
Third place (2): 2019, 2022
