= Sofía García =

Colombian footballer (born 2000)

Personal information
- Full name: Sofía García Gaviria
- Date of birth: 18 October 2000 (age 26)
- Place of birth: Medellín, Colombia
- Height: 1.71 m (5 ft 7 in)
- Position: Defender

Youth career
- 201?–201?: Independiente Medellín
- 201?–201?: Atlético Nacional

Senior career*
Years	Team	Apps	(Gls)
201?–2020	Formas Íntimas		
2021	Sporting Huelva	7	(0)
2021–2022	Independiente Medellín		
2022	Alianza Lima		
2023	Santa Fe		
2024	Santos Laguna	11	(1)

International career^{‡}
2020	Colombia U20	4	(0)
2019	Colombia	1	(0)
- * Club domestic league appearances and goals ‡ National team caps and goals as of 11 March 2020

Sofía García Gaviria (born 18 October 2000) is a Colombian footballer who played as a defender for Liga MX Femenil club Santos Laguna and the Colombia women's national team.

== Early life ==
García was born in Medellín. She started playing football at 7 and in a women's club at 10 in Independiente Medellín.

== Club career ==
García played for Formas Íntimas in Colombia. On 14 January 2021, she signed for Spanish club Sporting de Huelva to compete in Primera División.

== International career ==
García represented Colombia at the 2020 South American Under-20 Women's Football Championship. She made her senior debut for Colombia on 9 November 2019.
