= Atlético Nacional (women) =

Atlético Nacional Femenino
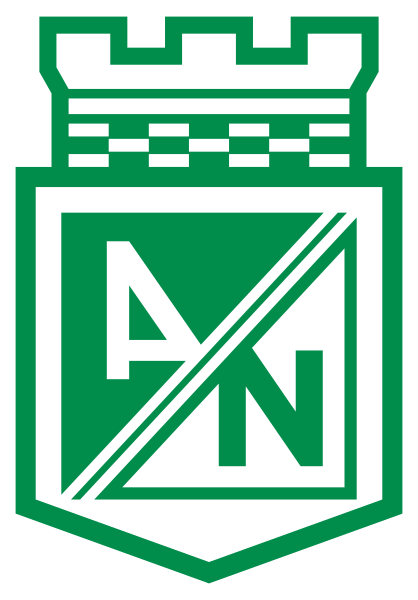
- Full name: Atlético Nacional S. A.
- Nickname: Las Verdolagas (The Purslanes)
- Founded: 25 August 2009; 16 years ago
- Ground: Atanasio Girardot
- Capacity: 44,826
- Owner: Organización Ardila Lülle
- Chairman: Sebastián Arango Botero
- Manager: Jorge Barreneche
- League: Colombian Women's Football League
- 2025: Women's League, 3rd of 16
- Website: http://www.atlnacional.com.co/
Home colours	Away colours	Third colours

Atlético Nacional Femenino is a professional women's football club based in Medellín, Colombia. They are the women's football section of Atlético Nacional and they currently play in the Colombian Women's Football League, the top level women's football league in Colombia.

== History ==
Atlético Nacional Femenino was founded as a youth academy team on 25 August 2009, with the project being led by manager Diego Bedoya and supported by Víctor Marulanda. Approximately 300 girls showed up to the recruitment sessions held by the club, of which 90 were eventually selected to start their development process and join the different youth divisions of the club. By 2017 a senior and an under-17 team were entered into the tournaments organized by Difútbol, the governing body of amateur football in Colombia, and participation in the Colombian Women's Football League organized by the professional body Dimayor was confirmed starting from 2018.

On 10 February 2018, Atlético Nacional played their first match in the professional women's football league, defeating Real Cartagena by a 2–0 score. The team reached the finals of the competition, in which they were defeated by Atlético Huila on penalty kicks. The club made it to the knockout stages of the domestic league in the subsequent seasons: in 2019 and 2020, Atlético Nacional reached the quarter-finals, being knocked out by América de Cali both times, and in 2021 they were defeated by Santa Fe in the semi-finals. However, in 2022 they placed eleventh in the first stage of the season and thus failed to advance to the final stages for the first time in the club's history.

On 15 December 2022, Atlético Nacional Femenino signed an alliance with amateur club Formas Íntimas aiming to form a competitive team to take part in the 2023 Colombian Women's Football League. At the same time, it was announced that manager Diego Bedoya had left the club after 13 years in charge, being replaced by Marco Barrios. Under the alliance with Formas Íntimas, the club once again reached the semi-finals in the domestic league and qualified for the 2023 Copa Libertadores Femenina, in which they ended in third place.

== Players ==
=== Current squad ===
As of 31 July 2025

Note: Flags indicate national team as defined under FIFA eligibility rules; some limited exceptions apply. Players may hold more than one non-FIFA nationality.

No.	Pos.	Nation	Player
2	DF	COL	Mary Álvarez
3	DF	ECU	Analiz Zambrano
4	DF	COL	Sofía García
7	MF	COL	Sara Martínez
8	MF	COL	Geraldine Cardona
9	FW	COL	Manuela González
12	GK	COL	Jimena Ospina
13	DF	COL	Laura Aguirre
14	DF	COL	Katerine Osorio
15	DF	COL	Karen Vidal
16	FW	COL	Sara Córdoba
18	MF	COL	Marian Sterling

No.	Pos.	Nation	Player
19	MF	COL	Mariana Mosquera
20	DF	COL	Lizeth Ocampo
21	MF	COL	Daniela Orozco
22	GK	COL	Stefany Castaño
23	DF	COL	Sofía Henao
24	DF	COL	Juliana Arboleda
27	FW	COL	Karina Valencia
28	DF	COL	Jylis Corena
30	MF	COL	Maira Neira
79	FW	COL	Kelly Restrepo
—	MF	ECU	Stefany Cedeño

== Honours ==
=== Domestic ===
- Liga Femenina Profesional
  - Runners-up (1): 2018

=== Continental ===
- Copa Libertadores Femenina
  - Third place (1): 2023
