= Independiente Medellín (women) =

Independiente Medellín Femenino
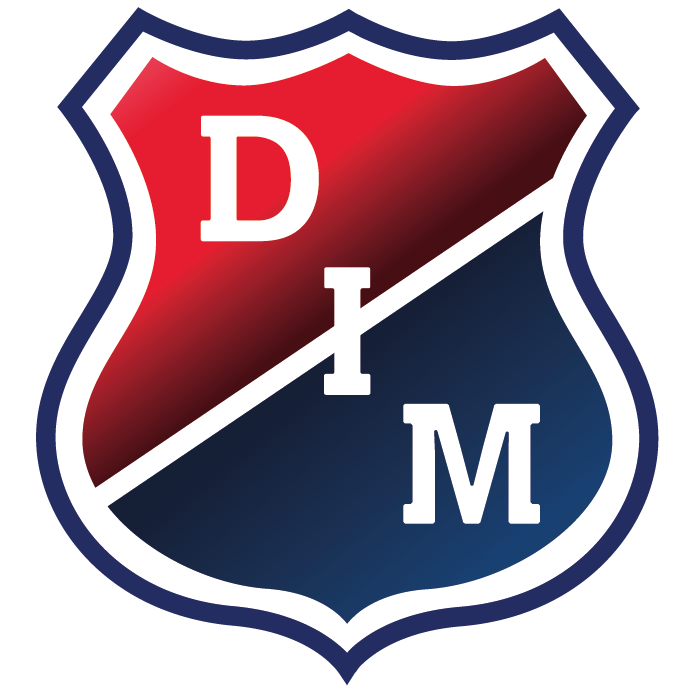
- Full name: Deportivo Independiente Medellín Femenino
- Nicknames: Las Poderosas (The Mighty Ones); El Equipo del Pueblo (The People's Team)
- Short name: DIM
- Founded: 21 June 2019; 7 years ago
- Ground: Atanasio Girardot
- Capacity: 44,826
- Owner: El Equipo del Pueblo S. A. (100%)
- Chairman: José Raúl Giraldo
- Manager: Jordy Vargas García
- League: Colombian Women's Football League
- 2025: Women's League, 5th of 16
- Website: http://dimoficial.com/
Home colours	Away colours

Deportivo Independiente Medellín Femenino is a professional women's football club based in Medellín, Colombia. They are the women's football section of Independiente Medellín and they currently play in the Colombian Women's Football League, the top level women's football league in Colombia. The club was founded in 2019 in an alliance between Independiente Medellín and Formas Íntimas. Their crosstown rivals are Atlético Nacional with whom they contest El Clásico Paisa. The club plays their home matches at the Estadio Atanasio Girardot, although it plays some of its home matches at the Estadio Polideportivo Sur in Envigado and at the Estadio Metropolitano Ciudad de Itagüí in Itagüí.

== History ==
On 21 June 2019, the men's football club Independiente Medellín and Formas Íntimas signed an alliance to play in the third season of the Colombian Women's Football League. They debuted in the 2019 league in group A together with Atlético Nacional, Once Caldas and Deportivo Pereira. On 14 July 2019, they played their first official match, defeating Deportivo Pereira 4–1 away. In that season they advanced to the knockout stage of the competition, defeating the titleholders Atlético Huila to reach the finals, which they lost to América de Cali over two legs.

The alliance with Formas Íntimas was in force until the end of 2022.

== Honours ==
=== Domestic ===
- Liga Femenina Profesional:

Runners-up (1): 2019
