= Colombian Women's Football League =

Football league in Colombia

Liga Betplay Dimayor Femenina
- Founded: 2017
- Country: Colombia
- Confederation: CONMEBOL
- Number of clubs: 16
- Level on pyramid: 1
- International cup: Copa Libertadores Femenina
- Current champions: Deportivo Cali (4th title) (2026)
- Most championships: Deportivo Cali (4 titles)
- Broadcaster(s): Win Sports; Win+ Fútbol
- Website: Official Site
- Current: 2026 season

The Liga Femenina Profesional de Fútbol Colombiano (Colombian Professional Women's Football League) or Liga Femenina BetPlay DIMAYOR (sponsored name) is the top level women's football league in Colombia. The first season was held in 2017, with 18 teams taking part. The champion qualifies to the Copa Libertadores Femenina.

== History ==
Colombia women's football had only regional leagues until 2016. The entrant to the Copa Libertadores Femenina was decided in a tournament called Copa Pre-Libertadores, in which non-professional clubs took part. The winning team in all editions was Formas Íntimas. In 2016 a tournament called Campeonato Nacional Interclubes was held, organized by the División Aficionada del Fútbol Colombiano (Difútbol). About 40 teams played in four stages for the championship. Generaciones Palmiranas won the final 6–5 on aggregate over Molino Viejo and qualified to the 2016 Copa Libertadores Femenina.

With the approval of Dimayor, the first professional women's football league was organized and played starting from 2017, with 18 out of Dimayor's 36 affiliate clubs, which were split into 3 groups of 6. It was planned to create a second level league to which new clubs would have entered starting from 2018, but this did not happen. A national women's league is a requirement to host the FIFA Women's World Cup, in which Colombia showed interest for the 2023 edition.

== Format ==
In 2017 the 18 teams were divided into three groups of six. After playing each other twice, the top two in each group and the best two third-placed teams advanced to the quarter-finals, with the winners going on to play the semi-finals and finals. All matches in the knockout stages were played as double-legged series. The tournament lasted five months between February and June.

In 2018 the 23 teams were divided into three groups of six and one group of five. After playing each other twice, the top two in each group advanced to the quarter-finals, with the winners going on to play the semi-finals and finals. All matches in the knockout stages were played as double-legged series. The tournament lasted four months between February and May.

== Teams ==
Notably absent from the list of clubs is Formas Íntimas, who have joined alliances with professional clubs such as Envigado (from 2017 to 2018), Independiente Medellín (from 2019 to 2022), and Atlético Nacional (from 2023 onwards) since participation in the league is restricted to professional clubs (DIMAYOR affiliates) only. The following 16 clubs took part in the 2026 season:

- América de Cali
- Atlético Bucaramanga
- Atlético Nacional
- Deportivo Cali
- Deportivo Pasto
- Fortaleza
- Independiente Medellín
- Inter Palmira
- Internacional de Bogotá
- Junior
- Llaneros
- Millonarios
- Once Caldas
- Orsomarso
- Real Santander
- Santa Fe

== List of finals ==
- (In bracket, title count):

| Ed. | Season | Champion | Scores | Runner-up | Winning manager | Leading goalscorer(s) |
|---|---|---|---|---|---|---|
| 1 | 2017 | Santa Fe (1) | 2–1, 1–0 | Atlético Huila | (Colombia) Agustín Julio | (Colombia) Manuela González (Atlético Bucaramanga; 13 goals) |
| 2 | 2018 | Atlético Huila (1) | 0–1, 2–1 (3–0 p) | Atlético Nacional | (Colombia) Virgilio Puerto | (Venezuela) Oriana Altuve (Santa Fe; 18 goals) |
| 3 | 2019 | América de Cali (1) | 2–0, 1–2 | Independiente Medellín | (Colombia) Andrés Usme | (Colombia) Linda Caicedo (América de Cali; 7 goals) (Venezuela) Joemar Guarecuco (Cortuluá; 7 goals) |
| 4 | 2020 | Santa Fe (2) | 2–1, 2–0 | América de Cali | (Colombia) Albeiro Erazo | (Venezuela) Ysaura Viso (Santa Fe; 13 goals) |
| 5 | 2021 | Deportivo Cali (1) | 4–1, 2–2 | Santa Fe | (Colombia) John Alber Ortiz | (Colombia) Catalina Usme (América de Cali; 12 goals) |
| 6 | 2022 | América de Cali (2) | 1–2, 3–1 | Deportivo Cali | (Colombia) Andrés Usme | (Colombia) Catalina Usme (América de Cali; 15 goals) |
| 7 | 2023 | Santa Fe (3) | 2–0, 0–0 | América de Cali | (Venezuela) Omar Ramírez | (Colombia) Catalina Usme (América de Cali; 11 goals) |
| 8 | 2024 | Deportivo Cali (2) | 2–1, 2–0 | Santa Fe | (Colombia) John Alber Ortiz | (Colombia) Marcela Restrepo (Atlético Nacional; 10 goals) (Colombia) Estefanía González (Independiente Medellín; 10 goals) |
| 9 | 2025 | Deportivo Cali (3) | 0–1, 1–0 (5–4 p) | Santa Fe | (Colombia) John Alber Ortiz | (Colombia) María Nela Carvajal (Orsomarso; 11 goals) |
| 10 | 2026 | Deportivo Cali (4) | 3–2, 4–2 | Santa Fe | (Colombia) John Alber Ortiz | (Colombia) Manuela González (Atlético Nacional; 15 goals) (Colombia) Ingrid Guerra (Deportivo Cali; 15 goals) |

== Titles by club ==
| Rank | Club | Winners | Runners-up | Winning years | Runners-up years |
|---|---|---|---|---|---|
| 1 | Deportivo Cali | 4 | 1 | 2021, 2024, 2025, 2026 | 2022 |
| 2 | Santa Fe | 3 | 4 | 2017, 2020, 2023 | 2021, 2024, 2025, 2026 |
| 3 | América de Cali | 2 | 2 | 2019, 2022 | 2020, 2023 |
| 4 | Atlético Huila | 1 | 1 | 2018 | 2017 |
| — | Atlético Nacional | 0 | 1 | — | 2018 |
| — | Independiente Medellín | 0 | 1 | — | 2019 |

== See also ==
- Football in Colombia
