= Deportivo Cali (women) =

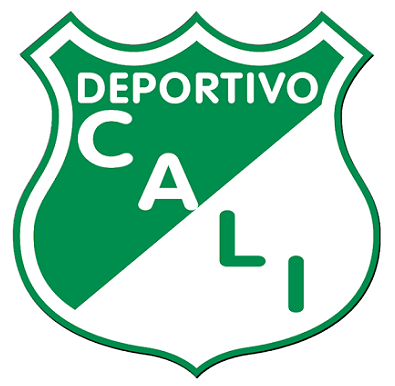
- Full name: Deportivo Cali Femenino
- Nicknames: Las Azucareras (The Sugarmakers); Las Verdiblancas (The Green-Whites)
- Founded: 23 May 2019; 7 years ago
- Ground: Deportivo Cali
- Capacity: 42,000
- Chairman: Joaquín Losada Fina
- Manager: Jhon Albert Ortiz
- League: Colombian Women's Football League
- 2026: Women's League, 1st of 16 (champions)
- Website: deportivocali.com.co
Home colours	Away colours	Third colours

Deportivo Cali Femenino, commonly known as Deportivo Cali, is a professional women's football club based in Cali, Colombia. They are the women's football section of Deportivo Cali and currently play in the Colombian Women's Football League, the top level women's football league in Colombia.

== History ==
Although Deportivo Cali declined to take part in the first Liga Femenina Profesional tournament in 2017 alleging that they lacked the financial resources to field both a men's and a women's team, the requirement issued by both CONMEBOL and DIMAYOR ahead of the 2019 season to field a women's team in order for the men's team to be allowed to compete in international competitions compelled Deportivo Cali to establish their professional women's football section, as the men's side qualified for the 2019 Copa Sudamericana on sporting merit.

In June 2018, Deportivo Cali organized their first "Women's Football Festival", aiming to recruit any potential players. In this event, matches and competitions between the club's satellite teams as well as the club's already existent women's football academy were held. The Carlos Sarmiento Lora football school also contributed to the formation of the women's squad. The team's participation in the Colombian Women's Football League was confirmed on 23 May 2019, whilst the women's team was officially presented on 10 July and three days later played its first game in the professional league, defeating Atlético F.C. by a 3–1 score.

Deportivo Cali's maiden participation in the women's league in 2019 ended with the team placing third in its group, behind América de Cali and Cortuluá, which prevented them from advancing to the playoff stage. They made it to the knockout stages of the league for the first time in 2020, finishing as runners-up of their first stage group to América de Cali, but were defeated by Millonarios in the quarter-finals.

In 2021, Deportivo Cali Femenino won their first league championship with an unbeaten campaign. In the group stage, they topped a group with América de Cali, Atlético Nacional, Independiente Medellín, Atlético Bucaramanga, and Real Santander with six wins and four draws for a total of 22 points. After defeating La Equidad in the semi-finals by a 4–1 aggregate score, they faced the defending champions Santa Fe in the final, clinching their first piece of silverware by winning the first leg 4–1 in Bogotá and drawing the return leg 2–2 at the Estadio Deportivo Cali. This title allowed them to take part in the 2021 Copa Libertadores Femenina played in Paraguay, in which they had a perfect group stage with three wins in three games only to be defeated by Uruguayan side Nacional in the quarter-finals.

In the 2022 Liga Femenina season, Deportivo Cali advanced to the knockout stages after finishing third in the first stage, but were unable to round up a successful title defense as they ended up losing the final to América de Cali. Following the Liga Femenina season, Deportivo Cali took part in the friendly tournament Copa Ídolas along with América de Cali, Atlético Mineiro, and Olimpia, which they won after defeating Atlético Mineiro on penalties in the final. The runner-up finish in the league qualified Deportivo Cali for the 2022 Copa Libertadores Femenina, in which they started their campaign with a 2–1 win over defending champions Corinthians. Another narrow victory over Olimpia and a 10–1 thrashing of Always Ready in the remaining group stage matches allowed them to win their group and advance to the quarter-finals, where they defeated another former champion in Ferroviária. Eventually, they lost to Boca Juniors on penalties in the semi-finals after a 1–1 draw, and ended up in fourth place of the competition after losing to crosstown rivals América de Cali 5–0 in the third place playoff. Due to their strong performance in the Copa Libertadores, Deportivo Cali Femenino placed 13th in the IFFHS Women's Club World Ranking as of 31 October 2022 with 300 points, being the third best ranked South American side after Brazilian sides Palmeiras and Corinthians. Manager Jhon Albert Ortiz left at the end of the season, and was replaced by Sergio Angulo for the 2023 league tournament, in which Deportivo Cali reached the quarter-finals where they lost to Deportivo Pereira.

In 2024, and with the return of manager Ortiz to the club, Deportivo Cali won their second league title. Las Azucareras advanced out of the first stage of the tournament in fourth place with 26 points behind Atlético Nacional, América de Cali, and Santa Fe, after winning seven matches, drawing five, and losing the remaining two, and for the following stage of the competition they were drawn into Group B along with crosstown rivals América, Millonarios, and Llaneros, clinching qualification for the finals after winning the group with 12 points and a higher goal difference than Millonarios. Just like in 2021, they faced Santa Fe in the final, however, this time Deportivo Cali won both matches in the series (2–1 at home and 2–0 in Bogotá with a brace by Manuela Paví) to claim the trophy.

In the 2025 league season, Deportivo Cali became the first club to win two consecutive women's league editions, defeating Santa Fe in the finals once again. The league title qualified them for the 2025 Copa Libertadores Femenina held in Argentina, in which the team was drawn into Group D along with Libertad from Paraguay, Nacional from Uruguay, and Chilean side Universidad de Chile. Deportivo Cali won their group after drawing in their first match with the Paraguayan team and defeating the other two group rivals. After defeating Brazilian team São Paulo in the quarter-finals and the Chilean champions Colo-Colo on penalty kicks in the semi-finals, Las Azucareras made it to the final where they faced the defending champions Corinthians, whom they held to a scoreless draw over 90 minutes before losing 5–3 on penalties.

== Current squad ==
As of 20 September 2026

Note: Flags indicate national team as defined under FIFA eligibility rules; some limited exceptions apply. Players may hold more than one non-FIFA nationality.

No.	Pos.	Nation	Player
1	GK	ECU	Andrea Vera
2	DF	COL	Angie Salazar
3	DF	COL	Katerine Osorio
4	DF	COL	Ana Fisgativa
5	DF	COL	Stefanía Perlaza
6	MF	COL	Paula Medina
7	MF	COL	Jessica Peña
8	MF	COL	Natalia Hernández
10	MF	COL	Daniela Castellanos
12	GK	PER	Maryory Sánchez
13	MF	COL	Valeria Cárdenas
14	FW	COL	Michelle Vásquez
15	FW	COL	Eidy Ruiz
16	MF	COL	Alejandra Jurado

No.	Pos.	Nation	Player
17	DF	COL	Lisseth Moreno
18	FW	COL	Ingrid Guerra
19	FW	COL	Melanin Aponzá
20	FW	COL	Karla Viancha
21	MF	COL	Isabella Santa
22	GK	COL	Sofía Prieto
23	MF	COL	Zharick Montoya
24	DF	COL	Jessica Bermeo
25	DF	COL	Andrea Gómez (on loan from Real Santander)
26	MF	COL	Loren Sánchez
29	MF	COL	María Morales
30	FW	COL	Lorena Cobos
31	GK	COL	Valentina González
44	DF	COL	Natalia Ruiz

== Honours ==
=== Domestic ===
- Liga Femenina Profesional:

Winners (4): 2021, 2024, 2025, 2026
Runners-up (1): 2022

=== International ===
- Copa Libertadores Femenina:

Runners-up (1): 2025

=== Friendly tournaments ===
- Copa Ídolas (1): 2022
