= Manuela González (footballer) =

Colombian footballer (born 1995)

Personal information
- Full name: Manuela Alexandra González Mendoza
- Date of birth: 29 August 1995 (age 31)
- Position: Forward

Team information
- Current team: Atlético Nacional
- Number: 9

Senior career*
Years	Team	Apps	(Gls)
????-2019	Atlético Huila		
2020	Atlético Huila	1	(3)
2021	Atlético Nacional		
2022	Deportivo Cali	2	(1)
2023-	Atlético Nacional	5	(5)

International career^{‡}
2015-2018	Colombia	1	(0)
- * Club domestic league appearances and goals ‡ National team caps and goals as of 6 June 2015 (before the 2015 FIFA Women's World Cup)

Manuela Alexandra González Mendoza (born 29 August 1995) is a Colombian footballer who plays as a forward for Atlético Nacional. She is a member of the Colombia women's national football team. She was part of the team at the 2015 FIFA Women's World Cup. At the club level, she plays for CD Palmiranas in Colombia.

González finished joint top-scorer of the 2016 Copa Libertadores Femenina.
