= Yumbo =

- Municipality and town
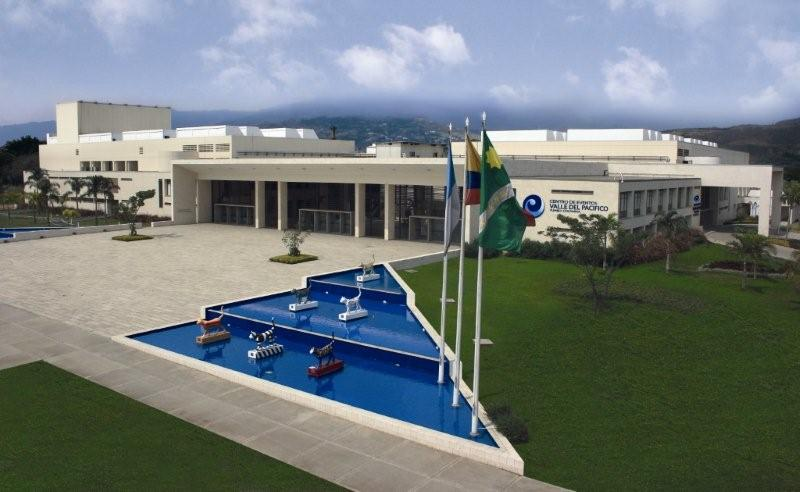

- Flag Coat of arms

- Location of the municipality and town of Yumbo in the Valle del Cauca Department of Colombia

- Location in Colombia
- Coordinates: 3°35′N 76°28′W
- Country: Colombia
- Department: Valle del Cauca Department
- Founded: 1536
- Incorporated: 1864
- Founder: Miguel Muñoz

Government
  - Mayor: David Murgueitio Fernando Cardenas

Area
  - Municipality and town: 230.6 km^{2} (89.0 sq mi)
  - Urban: 31.6 km^{2} (12.2 sq mi)
- Elevation: 855 m (2,805 ft)

Population (2020 est.)
  - Municipality and town: 110,069
  - Density: 477.3/km^{2} (1,236/sq mi)
  - Urban: 95,072
  - Urban density: 3,010/km^{2} (7,790/sq mi)
- Demonym: Yumbo
- Time zone: UTC-5 (Colombia Standard Time)
- Area code: 57 + 2
- Website: Official website

Yumbo is a small, industrial city and municipality in western Colombia. It is located in the Valle del Cauca Department, just north of Cali. In 2020, the municipality had a population of approximately 110,000.

== History ==
Modern Yumbo was founded in 1536 by Miguel Muñoz.

== Climate ==
Yumbo has a relatively dry but extremely foggy and sunless tropical savanna climate (Köppen Aw) not unlike the climate of Bogotá except substantially hotter due to the lower elevation.

Climate data for Yumbo (Buitrera La), elevation 1,500 m (4,900 ft), (1981–2010)
Month	Jan	Feb	Mar	Apr	May	Jun	Jul	Aug	Sep	Oct	Nov	Dec	Year
Mean daily maximum °C (°F)	26.1 (79.0)	26.6 (79.9)	26.3 (79.3)	26.0 (78.8)	25.6 (78.1)	25.8 (78.4)	26.7 (80.1)	27.5 (81.5)	27.0 (80.6)	26.0 (78.8)	25.1 (77.2)	25.4 (77.7)	26.2 (79.2)
Daily mean °C (°F)	20.6 (69.1)	20.9 (69.6)	20.9 (69.6)	20.7 (69.3)	20.6 (69.1)	20.7 (69.3)	21.1 (70.0)	21.2 (70.2)	20.9 (69.6)	20.5 (68.9)	20.0 (68.0)	20.2 (68.4)	20.7 (69.3)
Mean daily minimum °C (°F)	16.6 (61.9)	16.5 (61.7)	16.6 (61.9)	16.6 (61.9)	16.7 (62.1)	16.5 (61.7)	16.3 (61.3)	16.3 (61.3)	16.2 (61.2)	16.3 (61.3)	16.3 (61.3)	16.4 (61.5)	16.4 (61.5)
Average precipitation mm (inches)	64.8 (2.55)	59.5 (2.34)	106.7 (4.20)	143.2 (5.64)	119.5 (4.70)	69.9 (2.75)	44.8 (1.76)	40.8 (1.61)	71.7 (2.82)	124.8 (4.91)	122.3 (4.81)	79.3 (3.12)	1,047.4 (41.24)
Average precipitation days	9	9	12	15	13	9	7	6	9	15	14	10	128
Average relative humidity (%)	85	85	86	87	88	87	84	82	83	86	88	88	86
Mean monthly sunshine hours	108.5	98.8	99.2	84.0	80.6	87.0	127.1	142.6	111.0	93.0	78.0	83.7	1,193.5
Mean daily sunshine hours	3.5	3.5	3.2	2.8	2.6	2.9	4.1	4.6	3.7	3.0	2.6	2.7	3.3
Source: Instituto de Hidrologia Meteorologia y Estudios Ambientales

== Transportation ==
The closest airport that services the city is Cali's international airport, which is in Palmira and is called Alfonso Bonilla Aragón International Airport (CLO) or Palmaseca. Many airlines provide service for the airport, including American Airlines, AeroRepública, Spain's Iberia and Avianca, Colombia's largest airline.

== Education ==
The Universidad del Valle has a campus in Yumbo. Its address is located at Calle 2 Norte No. 1A - 105 Barrio Las Vegas.

== Industry ==
The city of Yumbo is known to be a rough area with a few factories, including concrete plants, which causes air pollution in that area. Bico International, a company that makes a complete line of school and office products, has a production plant in Yumbo, where it exports to various countries in Latin America. In August 2006, SABMiller plc, one of the world's leading brewers, announced it would invest $175 million US dollars in a new brewery in Yumbo, in order to keep pace with growing demand in the western Colombia. The new brewery, which will become operational in late 2007, will have an initial capacity of 350 million litres, increasing to 450 million litres by 2009. It will replace an existing 130 million litre facility in the central Cali, which is almost 80 years old and is on a site that can no longer be expanded. The new plant will be built on a high technological level and will provide employment for approximately 200 people. It will also include two new bottling lines, a keg plant and a new can line by the year 2009.
