= Estadio Deportivo Cali =

Football stadium in Palmira, Colombia

Coordinates: 03°31′17.91″N 76°25′01.33″W

- Estadio de Palmaseca; Coloso de Rozo
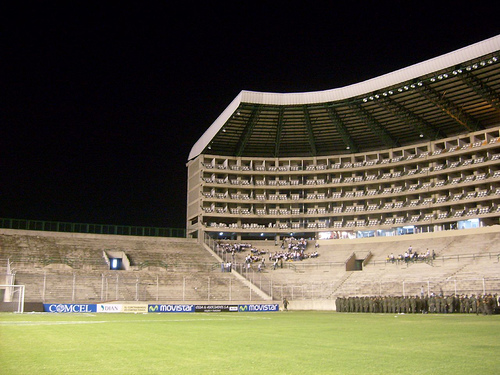
- Interactive map of Estadio Deportivo Cali
- Location: Palmira, Colombia
- Owner: Deportivo Cali
- Capacity: 42,000 (Currently capped at 30,000)
- Surface: Grass

Construction
- Groundbreaking: 2003
- Opened: 2010
- Architect: José Vicente Viteri

Tenants
- Deportivo Cali; Deportivo Cali (women)

Estadio Deportivo Cali, also called Estadio de Palmaseca, is a football stadium located in Palmira, Colombia. The stadium opened in 2010, and is the home of Deportivo Cali. Its original capacity was for 61,890 people, but it was reduced to 52,000 due to renovations. Since construction, it has been one of the largest stadiums of the country, although the installation of 12,000 seats in its western and eastern stands before the start of the 2018 season further reduced capacity to 42,000. Due to issues involving evacuation safety and limited access roads to the stadium, its capacity is capped at 25,000 as of 2017.

The construction of the Deportivo Cali stadium was halted and geographically shifted (250 metres) after remains belonging to a Pre-Columbian ancient indigenous culture were found in the area of building.

On 12 September 2021, and on the occasion of the second leg of the 2021 Liga Femenina final series between Deportivo Cali and Santa Fe, the stadium was temporarily renamed Estadio Deportivo Cali – Myriam Guerrero to honor Myriam Guerrero, a pioneer of women's football in Colombia who was the first team captain and only female manager of the Colombia women's national football team.

== Average attendances ==
Tenants	League season	Home games	Average attendance
Deportivo Cali	2023 Clausura	10	19,375
Deportivo Cali	2023 Apertura	10	14,280
