= Deportivo Pereira (women) =

Colombian women's football club

Deportivo Pereira Femenino
- Nickname(s): Las Matecañas (The Matecañas)
- Founded: 2017; 8 years ago
- Ground: Estadio Hernán Ramírez Villegas
- Capacity: 30,297
- Chairman: Álvaro López Bedoya
- Manager: Carlos Ariel Osorio
- League: Colombian Women's Football League
- 2024: Women's League, 13th of 15
- Website: http://www.deportivopereira.com.co/
Home colours	Away colours	Third colours

Deportivo Pereira Femenino is a professional Colombian women's football team based in Pereira, that currently plays in the Colombian Women's Football League. It is the women's football section of Deportivo Pereira. They play their home games at the Hernán Ramírez Villegas stadium.

== History ==
Deportivo Pereira Femenino was founded in 2017. After not playing in the 2020 and 2021 seasons, the club would return to competition in 2022, with a sports project that is set to last until at least 2025.

== Stadium ==
Like their male counterpart, Deportivo Pereira Femenino play their home matches at Estadio Hernán Ramírez Villegas, with a capacity of 30,297 and opened in 1971.
