= Independiente Santa Fe (women) =

Santa Fe
- Full name: Club Independiente Santa Fe Femenino
- Nickname: Las Leonas (The Lionesses)
- Founded: 2016; 10 years ago
- Ground: Nemesio Camacho
- Capacity: 39,512
- Chairman: Eduardo Méndez
- Manager: Omar Ramírez
- League: Colombian Women's Football League
- 2026: Women's League, 5th of 16 (season runners-up)
- Website: http://independientesantafe.co/
Home colours	Away colours	Third colours

Club Independiente Santa Fe Femenino, commonly known as Independiente Santa Fe or simply Santa Fe, is a professional women's football club based in Bogotá, Colombia. They are the women's football section of Independiente Santa Fe and they currently play in the Colombian Women's Football League, the top level women's football league in Colombia. To date, the club has won three league titles.

Like the institution's male counterpart, who were the first Colombian professional football champion in the 1948 season, the women's team obtained the honor of being the first team to win the Colombian Women's Football League, with their title in the first edition of the competition in 2017.

In 2016, for the foundation of the women's team, Independiente Santa Fe formed an alliance with the amateur team Future Soccer, thus establishing the team.

== History ==
In 2000, a football school named Club Los Amigos was established in the south of Bogotá, which also attracts women. In 2005, the club was renamed Club Future Soccer. In 2006, the club took part in its first women's tournament and made a name for itself in the country with its young teams. In 2013, players from Future Soccer were called up to the national under-17 team.

In 2016, the foundation of the Colombian Women's Football Championship was announced. Future Soccer had sought an alliance with a big club from Bogotá to register in this new championship. The collaboration started with Independiente Santa Fe, which entered the team in the amateur championship where the team was unbeaten all the first phase and lost in the final on penalties against Club Molino Viejo.

In 2017, the first women's championship was launched, Santa Fe strengthened its team with international players and won its first match on February 19 three to zero against La Equidad at home. The Lionesses won all their matches of the first phase, they went into the final where they defeated Atlético Huila (2–1 and 1–0), in the return match at Estadio El Campín where the club set an attendance record for a women's football match with 33,327 spectators. Like the men's section in 1948, Santa Fe Femenino won the first national women's football championship.

In 2018, Santa Fe were first in its group but were eliminated in the semi-finals. The following season, they were eliminated in the quarter-finals. In 2020, Santa Fe won their second title by defeating América de Cali in the final, while in 2021 they also made it to the final, in which they lost to Deportivo Cali.

== Players ==
=== Current squad ===
As of 7 October 2026

Note: Flags indicate national team as defined under FIFA eligibility rules; some limited exceptions apply. Players may hold more than one non-FIFA nationality.

No.	Pos.	Nation	Player
1	GK	COL	Wendy Martínez
2	DF	COL	María Nela Carvajal
3	DF	COL	Cristina Motta
4	DF	COL	Andrea Pérez
5	MF	VEN	Micheel Baldallo
6	DF	COL	Viviana Acosta
7	MF	COL	Mariana Zamorano
8	MF	COL	Juana Ortegón
9	FW	VEN	Francelis Graterol
10	MF	COL	Isabella Díaz
11	MF	COL	Mariana Silva
12	GK	COL	Jimena Ospina (on loan from Inter Palmira)
13	MF	COL	Isis de la Cruz
14	MF	COL	Sofía Castañeda
15	DF	COL	Brenda Cardona
16	MF	COL	Karen Hernández
17	MF	COL	Daniela Garavito
18	FW	VEN	Ysaura Viso

No.	Pos.	Nation	Player
19	MF	COL	Gabriela Huertas
20	FW	COL	Natalia Orozco
21	DF	COL	Katherine Valbuena
22	GK	COL	Melany Díaz
23	FW	COL	Mariana Cabrera
24	MF	VEN	Tahicelis Marcano
25	DF	COL	Sophía Posada
27	MF	COL	Helen Cárdenas
29	FW	COL	Manuela González (on loan from Atlético Nacional)
31	DF	COL	Sofía Valencia
33	DF	COL	Laura Tovar
34	MF	COL	Alejandra Díaz
35	DF	COL	Izabella Cortés
77	FW	COL	Nikol Rojas
80	FW	COL	Wendis Cabrera (on loan from Inter Bogotá)
—	GK	PAR	Arianne González
—	DF	COL	Kelly Ibargüen
—	FW	COL	Camila Cortés

== Honours ==
=== Domestic ===
- Liga Femenina Profesional
  - Winners (3): 2017, 2020, 2023
  - Runners-up (4): 2021, 2024, 2025, 2026

=== Continental ===
- Copa Libertadores Femenina
  - Runners-up (2): 2021, 2024
  - Third place (1): 2026
