= Orsomarso S.C. =

Colombian football club

Orsomarso
- Full name: Orsomarso Sportivo Clube
- Nicknames: Orso; Los Palmiranos; Cantera de diamantes (Quarry of diamonds)
- Founded: 7 December 2012; 13 years ago
- Ground: Municipal Raúl Miranda
- Capacity: 3,500
- President: Carlos Manuel Suárez
- Head coach: Mauricio Arquez
- League: Categoría Primera B
- 2025: Primera B, 12th of 16
- Website: www.orsomarsosportivoclube.com/sc/
Home colours	Away colours

Orsomarso Sportivo Clube is a Colombian professional football team based in Palmira. Founded in 2012, the club currently competes in the Categoría Primera B, and plays its home games at the Estadio Municipal Raúl Miranda in Yumbo. The club played at Francisco Rivera Escobar stadium since its foundation until 2025, having also used Daniel Villa Zapata stadium in Barrancabermeja between 2025 and 2026. Its name comes from the Italian comune Orsomarso.

== History ==
Orsomarso S.C. was founded on 7 December 2012 on the initiative of José Gabriel Sangiovanni, whose father José "Pepino" Sangiovanni (born in Orsomarso, Italy) and brother Oreste had also been linked to football as both served as chairmen of América de Cali. The club was originally created as a football academy based in the village of El Carmelo in Candelaria, Valle del Cauca, aiming to help young footballers with limited economic resources start a professional footballing career. By July, Orsomarso already had an under-17 squad, under-19 squad, and a senior team which entered the amateur league of the Valle del Cauca Department (Copa El País), whilst the youth teams joined the youth championships organized by the Colombian Football Federation.

In January 2016, Orsomarso turned into a professional football club after its owners bought the affiliation rights (ficha) that belonged to Uniautónoma, club that was dissolved at the conclusion of the 2015 season and joined Categoría Primera B for the 2016 season. The club played its first professional match on 10 February 2016 against América de Cali, which was valid for the Copa Colombia and ended in a 2–0 defeat, while its first league match was a 2–0 away victory over Unión Magdalena four days later. In its first season as a professional club, Orsomarso failed to reach the final stages of the Primera B tournament, placing 11th with 40 points.

Orsomarso advanced out of the first stage of the second division championship for the first time in 2017, being eliminated in the Apertura tournament quarter-finals by Deportes Quindío. They also qualified for the knockout stages of that season's Finalización tournament, in which they were knocked out by Leones on penalties in the quarter-finals. The team was unable to replicate those performances in subsequent seasons, usually placing near to the bottom of the table.

Seven years passed for Orsomarso to once again advance to the final stages of the Primera B tournament, as they placed seventh in the first stage of the 2024 Torneo I with 25 points. For the following stage of the competition, they were drawn into Group A along with Atlético Huila, Tigres, and Real Cartagena. Orsomarso topped the group with 13 points, after winning four matches, drawing one, and losing the remaining one against Real Cartagena on the final matchday, with which they reached their first Primera B final series. There they faced Llaneros, losing on penalty kicks after a 2–2 draw on aggregate.

In 2025, Orsomarso changed their home stadium, moving from their usual venue Estadio Francisco Rivera Escobar in Palmira to Estadio Municipal Raúl Miranda in Yumbo, Valle del Cauca Department after signing an agreement with the Yumbo Municipality to play there for one season. Although Orsomarso played most of their home games in the Apertura tournament in Yumbo, they chose to host their final match in that tournament at Estadio Daniel Villa Zapata in Barrancabermeja, aiming to get support from the city's inhabitants while also capitalizing on the local government's desire to have a professional team representing Barrancabermeja following the departure of Alianza Petrolera in early 2024. Orsomarso eventually reached an agreement with the city's government and confirmed the relocation of their home matches to Estadio Daniel Villa Zapata starting from the second semester of 2025 and lasting until at least 2027. The club's youth setup remained based in the Valle del Cauca Department.

== Players ==
=== First-team squad ===
As of 7 October 2026

Note: Flags indicate national team as defined under FIFA eligibility rules; some limited exceptions apply. Players may hold more than one non-FIFA nationality.

No.	Pos.	Nation	Player
1	GK	COL	Johan Grisales
2	DF	COL	Nawer Vargas
3	MF	COL	Juan Salinas
4	DF	COL	Víctor Lasso
5	DF	COL	Deivi Barrios
6	FW	COL	Santiago Agamez
7	FW	COL	Bayron Caicedo (on loan from Inter Bogotá)
8	MF	COL	Johan Muñoz
9	MF	COL	Santiago Arrechea
10	FW	COL	Andrés Ruiz
11	FW	COL	Maicol Preciado
12	GK	COL	Iker Blanco (on loan from Independiente Medellín)
13	DF	COL	Jhon Barreiro (on loan from Deportivo Cali)
14	FW	COL	Jhoiner Zarante
15	MF	COL	Kevin Gómez

No.	Pos.	Nation	Player
16	MF	COL	Royner Benítez (on loan from Águilas Doradas)
17	MF	COL	José Hernández
18	FW	COL	Yeiner Valoyes
20	MF	COL	Kevin Cortés (on loan from Santa Fe)
21	MF	COL	Deivid Castro (on loan from Inter Bogotá)
22	MF	COL	Dennis Matamba
23	FW	COL	Faver Marulanda
24	FW	COL	Brayan Campaz (on loan from Millonarios)
25	FW	COL	Josué Villarreal
26	MF	COL	Samuel González
27	MF	COL	Jader Contreras
28	FW	COL	Yordany Valencia
29	MF	COL	Sergio Martínez
30	GK	COL	Cristian Cossio
32	DF	COL	Miguel Ruiz

== Managers ==
- (Colombia) José Sangiovanni (June 2016 – December 2019)
- (Colombia) Edwards Muñoz (January 2020 – June 2021)
- (Colombia) Víctor Barón (July 2021 – October 2022)
- (Argentina) Diego Steffaneti (November 2022 – December 2022)
- (Colombia) José Sangiovanni (January 2023 – June 2023)
- (Colombia) Stiven Sánchez (July 2023 – May 2026)
- (Colombia) Mauricio Arquez (May 2026 – present)
