= 2021 Copa Libertadores Femenina =

Tournament details
- Host country: Paraguay; Uruguay (final match)
- Dates: 3–21 November 2021
- Teams: 16 (from 10 associations)

Final positions
- Champions: (Brazil) Corinthians (3rd title)
- Runners-up: (Colombia) Santa Fe
- Third place: (Brazil) Ferroviária
- Fourth place: (Uruguay) Nacional

Tournament statistics
- Matches played: 32
- Goals scored: 102 (3.19 per match)
- Top scorer(s): (Colombia) Tatiana Ariza (Colombia) Linda Caicedo (Brazil) Jheniffer (Uruguay) Esperanza Pizarro (Brazil) Victória (4 goals each)

The 2021 Copa CONMEBOL Libertadores Femenina was the 13th edition of the CONMEBOL Libertadores Femenina (also referred to as the Copa Libertadores Femenina), South America's premier women's club football tournament organized by CONMEBOL.

The competition was initially scheduled to be played from 30 September to 16 October 2021 in Chile. On 29 July 2021, CONMEBOL announced that although the other rounds would be played in Chile, the final match would be played at the Estadio Centenario in Montevideo, Uruguay on 24 November 2021. Thus, the final was to be played between the 2021 Copa Sudamericana and the men's 2021 Copa Libertadores finals that would also be played in Montevideo. The tournament organizers did not agree with this decision and on 3 August 2021 they communicated to CONMEBOL that Chile would not host the championship. On 13 August 2021, CONMEBOL confirmed that the competition would be played from 3 to 21 November 2021, with Paraguay hosting the competition up to the third place play-off and the final being played at Estadio Centenario in Montevideo. Finally, on 10 September 2021, CONMEBOL announced that the final match was moved to the Estadio Gran Parque Central in Montevideo. Ferroviária were the defending champions, but they were eliminated in the semi-finals.

Corinthians (Brazil) defeated Santa Fe (Colombia) 2–0 to win their third title. In the Final, VAR was used for the first time in a Copa Libertadores Femenina match.

Alianza Lima became the first Peruvian team to qualify for the single-elimination stages. After their elimination in the quarter-finals, Kindermann ended their partnership with Avaí and the team was disbanded in November 2021. In January 2022 Avaí took control and assured the continuity of the team during 2022.

== Format ==
For the group stage, the 16 teams were drawn into four groups. Teams in each group played one another in a round-robin basis, with the top two teams of each group advancing to the quarter-finals. Starting from the quarter-finals, the teams played a single-elimination tournament.

== Teams ==
The competition was contested by 16 teams:

- the champions of all ten CONMEBOL associations
- the title holders
- an additional team from the host association
- four additional teams from associations with the best historical performance in the tournament (associations in **bold** receive two berths according to the points total until the 2020 edition).
  1. Brazil: 220 points
  2. Chile: 136 points
  3. Colombia: 120 points
  4. Paraguay: 104 points
  5. Argentina: 90 points
  6. Venezuela: 77 points
  7. Ecuador: 60 points
  8. Uruguay: 43 points
  9. Bolivia: 38 points
  10. Peru: 29 points

Association	Team	Qualifying method	Participation	Previous best result
Argentina	San Lorenzo	2021 Torneo Apertura de Fútbol Femenino champions	2nd	Group stage (2009)
Bolivia	Real Tomayapo	2021 Copa Simón Bolívar Femenina champions	1st	—
Brazil	Ferroviária (Brazil 1)	2020 Copa Libertadores Femenina champions	5th	**Champions** (2015, 2020)
Brazil	Corinthians (Brazil 2)	2020 Campeonato Brasileiro Feminino A1 champions	4th (Note: Corinthians won the 2017 title as a partnership with Audax. They created their own team for the 2018 season.)	**Champions** (2017, 2019)
Brazil	Kindermann/Avaí (Brazil 3)	2020 Campeonato Brasileiro Feminino A1 runners-up	2nd	Group stage (2020)
Chile	Santiago Morning (Chile 1)	2020 Campeonato Femenino de Transición champions	3rd	Quarter-finals (2019, 2020)
Chile	Universidad de Chile (Chile 2)	2020 Campeonato Femenino de Transición runners-up	2nd	Fourth place (2020)
Colombia	Deportivo Cali (Colombia 1)	2021 Liga Femenina BetPlay DIMAYOR champions	1st	—
Colombia	Santa Fe (Colombia 2)	2021 Liga Femenina BetPlay DIMAYOR runners-up	3rd	Quarter-finals (2020)
Ecuador	Deportivo Cuenca	2021 SuperLiga Femenina DirecTV champions	2nd	Quarter-finals (2019)
Paraguay (hosts)	Cerro Porteño (Paraguay 1)	2021 Campeonato Femenino champions	7th	Third place (2014)
Paraguay (hosts)	Sol de América (Paraguay 2)	2021 Campeonato Femenino runners-up	2nd	Group stage (2020)
Paraguay (hosts)	Deportivo Capiatá (Paraguay 3)	2021 Campeonato Femenino third place (Host association additional entry)	2nd	Group stage (2017)
Peru	Alianza Lima	2021 Liga Femenina FPF champions	1st	—
Uruguay	Nacional	2020 Primera División "Torneo Rexona de Fútbol Femenino" champions	5th	Group stage (2011, 2012, 2013, 2016)
Venezuela	Yaracuyanos	2021 Liga FUTVE Fem – Torneo de Adecuación champions	1st	—

== Venues ==
Matches in the competition were played at Estadio Manuel Ferreira and Estadio Arsenio Erico, both in Asunción, Paraguay, except for the final which was played at Estadio Gran Parque Central in Montevideo, Uruguay.

== Match officials ==
On 21 September 2021, CONMEBOL announced the referees and assistant referees appointed for the tournament.

Association	Referees	Assistant referees	Support referees
Argentina	Laura Fortunato	Mariana de Almeida; Daiana Milone	Salomé di Iorio
Bolivia	Adriana Farfán	Inés Choque; Maricela Urapuca	
Brazil	Edina Alves Batista	Neuza Back; Leila Moreira	Daiane Muniz
Chile	María Belén Carvajal	Loreto Toloza; Cindy Nahuelcoy	
Colombia	María Victoria Daza	Mary Blanco; Nataly Arteaga	
Ecuador	Susana Corella	Mónica Amboya; Viviana Segura	
Paraguay	Zulma Quiñónez	Nancy Fernández; Laura Miranda	
Peru	Elizabeth Tintaya	Gabriela Moreno; Mariana Aquino	
Uruguay	Anahí Fernández	Adela Sánchez; Daiana Fernández	
Venezuela	Emikar Calderas	Migdalia Rodríguez; Laura Cárdenas	

== Draw ==
The draw for the tournament was held on 24 September 2021, 12:00 PYT (UTC−4), at the CONMEBOL Convention Center in Luque, Paraguay. The 16 teams were drawn into four groups of four.

Two teams were directly assigned to the head of groups A and B.

- To Group A: as 2020 Copa Libertadores Femenina champions, Ferroviária (Brazil 1)
- To Group B: as champions of the host association, Cerro Porteño (Paraguay 1)

The remaining teams (excluding the four teams from national associations with an extra berth) were seeded into three pots based on the final placement of their national association's club in the previous edition of the tournament, excluding the champions, with the highest two (Colombia 1 and Brazil 2) placed in Pot 1, the next four (Chile 1, Argentina, Paraguay 2 and Peru) placed in Pot 2 and the lowest four (Uruguay, Ecuador, Venezuela and Bolivia) in Pot 3. The four additional teams from associations with the best historical performance (Brazil 3, Chile 2, Colombia 2 and Paraguay 3) were seeded into Pot 4. From Pot 1, the first team drawn was placed into group C and the second team drawn placed into group D, both teams assigned to position 1 in their group. From each remaining pot, the first team drawn was placed into Group A, the second team drawn placed into Group B, the third team drawn placed into Group C and the final team drawn placed into Group D, with teams from Pot 2, 3 and 4 assigned to positions 2, 3 and 4 in their group. Teams from the same association could not be drawn into the same group.

Pot 1	Pot 2	Pot 3	Pot 4
(Colombia) Deportivo Cali; (Brazil) Corinthians	(Chile) Santiago Morning; (Argentina) San Lorenzo; (Paraguay) Sol de América^{[1]}; (Peru) Alianza Lima	(Uruguay) Nacional; (Ecuador) Deportivo Cuenca; (Venezuela) Yaracuyanos; (Bolivia) Real Tomayapo^{[1]}	(Brazil) Kindermann/Avaí; Universidad de Chile; (Colombia) Santa Fe; (Paraguay) Deportivo Capiatá^{[1]}

^{1} The draw was held before the identities of Paraguay 2 (Sol de América), Paraguay 3 (Deportivo Capiatá), and Bolivia (Real Tomayapo) were known.

The draw resulted in the following groups:

Group A
Pos	Team
A1	(Brazil) Ferroviária
A2	(Paraguay) Sol de América
A3	(Ecuador) Deportivo Cuenca
A4	(Colombia) Santa Fe

Group B
Pos	Team
B1	(Paraguay) Cerro Porteño
B2	(Chile) Santiago Morning
B3	(Venezuela) Yaracuyanos
B4	(Brazil) Kindermann/Avaí

Group C
Pos	Team
C1	(Colombia) Deportivo Cali
C2	(Peru) Alianza Lima
C3	(Bolivia) Real Tomayapo
C4	Universidad de Chile

Group D
Pos	Team
D1	(Brazil) Corinthians
D2	(Argentina) San Lorenzo
D3	(Uruguay) Nacional
D4	(Paraguay) Deportivo Capiatá

== Group stage ==
In the group stage, the teams were ranked according to points (3 points for a win, 1 point for a draw, 0 points for a loss). If tied on points, tiebreakers would be applied in the following order (Regulations Article 23).

1. Goal difference;
2. Goals scored;
3. Head-to-head result in games between tied teams;
4. Number of red cards;
5. Number of yellow cards;
6. Drawing of lots.

The winners and runners-up of each group advanced to the quarter-finals.

All times are local, PYST (UTC−3).

=== Group A ===
Pos	Team	Pld	W	D	L	GF	GA	GD	Pts	Qualification
1	(Brazil) Ferroviária	3	2	1	0	5	1	+4	7	Quarter-finals
2	(Colombia) Santa Fe	3	2	1	0	3	0	+3	7	Quarter-finals
3	(Ecuador) Deportivo Cuenca	3	1	0	2	5	3	+2	3	
4	(Paraguay) Sol de América	3	0	0	3	0	9	−9	0	

Source: CONMEBOL
3 November 2021
17:30

Ferroviária (Brazil)	3–0	(Paraguay) Sol de América
Suzane 51'; Carol Tavares 57'; Raquel 75'	Report

Estadio Manuel Ferreira, Asunción
Referee: Laura Fortunato (Argentina)
3 November 2021
19:45

Deportivo Cuenca (Ecuador)	0–1	(Colombia) Santa Fe
	Report	Gauto 79'

Estadio Manuel Ferreira, Asunción
Referee: Adriana Farfán (Bolivia)

6 November 2021
17:30

Ferroviária (Brazil)	2–1	(Ecuador) Deportivo Cuenca
Rafa Mineira 49' (pen.); Luana Sartório 59'	Report	Riera 53'

Estadio Manuel Ferreira, Asunción
Referee: Anahí Fernández (Uruguay)
6 November 2021
19:45

Sol de América (Paraguay)	0–2	(Colombia) Santa Fe
	Report	Guarecuco 16'; Chacón 90+4'

Estadio Manuel Ferreira, Asunción
Referee: María Belén Carvajal (Chile)

9 November 2021
17:30

Santa Fe (Colombia)	0–0	(Brazil) Ferroviária
	Report

Estadio Manuel Ferreira, Asunción
Referee: Salomé di Iorio (Argentina)
9 November 2021
19:45

Sol de América (Paraguay)	0–4	(Ecuador) Deportivo Cuenca
	Report	Riera 20', 90+2' (pen.); Ibarra 33' (o.g.); Bolaños 70'

Estadio Manuel Ferreira, Asunción
Referee: Elizabeth Tintaya (Peru)

=== Group B ===
Pos	Team	Pld	W	D	L	GF	GA	GD	Pts	Qualification
1	(Brazil) Kindermann/Avaí	3	2	1	0	6	1	+5	7	Quarter-finals
2	(Paraguay) Cerro Porteño	3	2	0	1	4	2	+2	6	Quarter-finals
3	(Chile) Santiago Morning	3	1	1	1	5	2	+3	4	
4	(Venezuela) Yaracuyanos	3	0	0	3	1	11	−10	0	

Source: CONMEBOL
3 November 2021
17:30

Cerro Porteño (Paraguay)	1–0	(Chile) Santiago Morning
González 37'	Report

Estadio Arsenio Erico, Asunción
Referee: María Victoria Daza (Colombia)
3 November 2021
19:45

Yaracuyanos (Venezuela)	0–4	(Brazil) Kindermann/Avaí
	Report	Caty 14'; Patrícia 22'; Lelê 63'; Cássia 85'

Estadio Arsenio Erico, Asunción
Referee: Elizabeth Tintaya (Peru)

6 November 2021
17:30

Cerro Porteño (Paraguay)	2–0	(Venezuela) Yaracuyanos
González 76'; Mendoza 90'	Report

Estadio Arsenio Erico, Asunción
Referee: Adriana Farfán (Bolivia)
6 November 2021
19:45

Santiago Morning (Chile)	0–0	(Brazil) Kindermann/Avaí
	Report

Estadio Arsenio Erico, Asunción
Referee: Salomé di Iorio (Argentina)

9 November 2021
17:30

Kindermann/Avaí (Brazil)	2–1	(Paraguay) Cerro Porteño
Camila 36'; Bárbara Melo 87'	Report	Riveros 81'

Estadio Arsenio Erico, Asunción
Referee: Laura Fortunato (Argentina)
9 November 2021
19:45

Santiago Morning (Chile)	5–1	(Venezuela) Yaracuyanos
Araya 20'; Acuña 68'; Vázquez 76'; Hernández 89'; Galaz 90+1'	Report	Higuera 45+2'

Estadio Arsenio Erico, Asunción
Referee: Susana Corella (Ecuador)

=== Group C ===
Pos	Team	Pld	W	D	L	GF	GA	GD	Pts	Qualification
1	(Colombia) Deportivo Cali	3	3	0	0	14	1	+13	9	Quarter-finals
2	(Peru) Alianza Lima	3	2	0	1	6	2	+4	6	Quarter-finals
3	Universidad de Chile	3	1	0	2	7	5	+2	3	
4	(Bolivia) Real Tomayapo	3	0	0	3	0	19	−19	0	

Source: CONMEBOL
4 November 2021
17:30

Deportivo Cali (Colombia)	2–0	(Peru) Alianza Lima
Ariza 36'; F. Caicedo 66'	Report

Estadio Manuel Ferreira, Asunción
Referee: Edina Alves Batista (Brazil)
4 November 2021
19:45

Real Tomayapo (Bolivia)	0–6	Universidad de Chile
	Report	Soto 15'; Fernández 45+1', 66', 84'; López 80'; Orellana 82' (pen.)

Estadio Manuel Ferreira, Asunción
Referee: Zulma Quiñónez (Paraguay)

7 November 2021
17:30

Deportivo Cali (Colombia)	8–0	(Bolivia) Real Tomayapo
L. Caicedo 6', 90+1'; Medina 10', 43'; Ariza 30', 66'; F. Caicedo 69'; Orozco 86'	Report

Estadio Manuel Ferreira, Asunción
Referee: Daiane Muniz (Brazil)
7 November 2021
19:45

Alianza Lima (Peru)	1–0	Universidad de Chile
Lúcar 84'	Report

Estadio Manuel Ferreira, Asunción
Referee: Emikar Calderas (Venezuela)

10 November 2021
17:30

Universidad de Chile	1–4	(Colombia) Deportivo Cali
Keefe 72' (pen.)	Report	Ariza 23' (pen.); Montoya 66'; L. Caicedo 68'; Carabalí 80'

Estadio Manuel Ferreira, Asunción
Referee: Edina Alves Batista (Brazil)
10 November 2021
19:45

Alianza Lima (Peru)	5–0	(Bolivia) Real Tomayapo
Dorador 8'; Bonilla 16'; Tristán 34'; Vilca 71'; Reyes 84'	Report

Estadio Manuel Ferreira, Asunción
Referee: Zulma Quiñónez (Paraguay)

=== Group D ===
Pos	Team	Pld	W	D	L	GF	GA	GD	Pts	Qualification
1	(Brazil) Corinthians	3	3	0	0	11	1	+10	9	Quarter-finals
2	(Uruguay) Nacional	3	2	0	1	6	5	+1	6	Quarter-finals
3	(Argentina) San Lorenzo	3	1	0	2	1	4	−3	3	
4	(Paraguay) Deportivo Capiatá	3	0	0	3	0	8	−8	0	

Source: CONMEBOL
4 November 2021
17:30

Corinthians (Brazil)	2–0	(Argentina) San Lorenzo
Érika 45'; Yasmim 64'	Report

Estadio Arsenio Erico, Asunción
Referee: Emikar Calderas (Venezuela)
4 November 2021
19:45

Nacional (Uruguay)	3–0	(Paraguay) Deportivo Capiatá
Pizarro 12', 22' (pen.); Ferradans 57'	Report

Estadio Arsenio Erico, Asunción
Referee: María Belén Carvajal (Chile)

7 November 2021
17:30

Corinthians (Brazil)	5–1	(Uruguay) Nacional
Tamires 1', 37'; Victória 6'; Gabi Zanotti 54'; Jheniffer 67'	Report	Poliana 42' (o.g.)

Estadio Arsenio Erico, Asunción
Referee: María Victoria Daza (Colombia)
7 November 2021
19:45

San Lorenzo (Argentina)	1–0	(Paraguay) Deportivo Capiatá
Ramírez 78'	Report

Estadio Arsenio Erico, Asunción
Referee: Susana Corella (Ecuador)

10 November 2021
17:30

Deportivo Capiatá (Paraguay)	0–4	(Brazil) Corinthians
	Report	Jheniffer 8', 35'; Diany 58'; Grazi 63'

Estadio Arsenio Erico, Asunción
Referee: Adriana Farfán (Bolivia)
10 November 2021
19:45

San Lorenzo (Argentina)	0–2	(Uruguay) Nacional
	Report	Badell 70'; Pizarro 71'

Estadio Arsenio Erico, Asunción
Referee: María Belén Carvajal (Chile)

== Final stages ==
Starting from the quarter-finals, the teams played a single-elimination tournament. If tied after full time, extra time would not be played, and the penalty shoot-out would be used to determine the winners (Regulations Article 25).

=== Bracket ===
Quarter-finals
12 November – Estadio Arsenio Erico
(Brazil) Ferroviária	3
(Paraguay) Cerro Porteño	0
12 November – Estadio Arsenio Erico
(Brazil) Kindermann/Avaí	2 (5)
(Colombia) Santa Fe (p)	2 (6)
13 November – Estadio Manuel Ferreira
(Colombia) Deportivo Cali	1
(Uruguay) Nacional	2
13 November – Estadio Manuel Ferreira
(Brazil) Corinthians	3
(Peru) Alianza Lima	1

Semi-finals
15 November – Estadio Manuel Ferreira
(Brazil) Ferroviária	1 (2)
(Colombia) Santa Fe (p)	1 (4)
16 November – Estadio Manuel Ferreira
(Uruguay) Nacional	0
(Brazil) Corinthians	8

Final
21 November – Estadio Gran Parque Central
(Colombia) Santa Fe	0
(Brazil) Corinthians	2
Third place
18 November – Estadio Arsenio Erico
(Brazil) Ferroviária (p)	1 (3)
(Uruguay) Nacional	1 (1)

=== Quarter-finals ===
12 November 2021
17:30

Ferroviária (Brazil)	3–0	(Paraguay) Cerro Porteño
Patrícia Sochor 45', 67'; Laryh 49'	Report

Estadio Arsenio Erico, Asunción
Referee: María Belén Carvajal (Chile)

12 November 2021
20:00

Kindermann/Avaí (Brazil)	2–2	(Colombia) Santa Fe
Lelê 53'; Cássia 79'	Report	Salazar 70'; Gauto 75' (pen.)
Penalties
Camila (penalty scored); Cássia (penalty missed); Tuani (penalty scored); Zóio (penalty missed); Caty (penalty scored); Lelê (penalty scored); Vilma (penalty scored); Geovana (penalty missed)	5–6	(penalty scored) Gauto; (penalty scored) Salazar; (penalty missed) Acosta; (penalty scored) Robledo; (penalty missed) M. Ramos; (penalty scored) Romero; (penalty scored) Guarecuco; (penalty scored) Rangel

Estadio Arsenio Erico, Asunción
Referee: Anahí Fernández (Uruguay)

13 November 2021
17:30

Deportivo Cali (Colombia)	1–2	(Uruguay) Nacional
L. Caicedo 10'	Report	Badell 19'; Pizarro 77'

Estadio Manuel Ferreira, Asunción
Referee: Zulma Quiñónez (Paraguay)

13 November 2021
20:00

Corinthians (Brazil)	3–1	(Peru) Alianza Lima
Tamires 1'; Victória 45+1', 53'	Report	Dorador 12'

Estadio Manuel Ferreira, Asunción
Referee: Laura Fortunato (Argentina)

=== Semi-finals ===
15 November 2021
17:30

Ferroviária (Brazil)	1–1	(Colombia) Santa Fe
Rafa Mineira 75'	Report	Robledo 42' (pen.)
Penalties
Rafa Mineira (penalty scored); Daiane (penalty scored); Monalisa (penalty missed); Raquel (penalty missed)	2–4	(penalty scored) Gauto; (penalty scored) Salazar; (penalty scored) Robledo; (penalty scored) Celis

Estadio Manuel Ferreira, Asunción
Referee: Emikar Calderas (Venezuela)

16 November 2021
17:30

Nacional (Uruguay)	0–8	(Brazil) Corinthians
	Report	Giovanna Campiolo 11'; Diany 49'; Victória 54'; Gabi Portilho 62'; Jheniffer 65'; Adriana 72' (pen.); Juliete 83'; Grazi 89'

Estadio Manuel Ferreira, Asunción
Referee: Susana Corella (Ecuador)

=== Third place match ===
18 November 2021
17:30

Ferroviária (Brazil)	1–1	(Uruguay) Nacional
Rafa Mineira 63'	Report	Badell 21'
Penalties
Rafa Mineira (penalty scored); Daiane (penalty missed); Duda Batista (penalty scored); Géssica (penalty scored)	3–1	(penalty scored) Bermúdez; (penalty missed) Lemos; (penalty missed) Pizarro; (penalty missed) Ferrada

Estadio Arsenio Erico, Asunción
Referee: Adriana Farfán (Bolivia)

=== Final ===
Daniela Arias (Santa Fe) was inscribed on the tournament but she did not play due to injury. Érika (Corinthians) was ruled out of the final due to ACL injury of her right knee.

21 November 2021
20:00

Santa Fe (Colombia)	0–2	(Brazil) Corinthians
	Report	Adriana 10'; Gabi Portilho 42'

Estadio Gran Parque Central, Montevideo
Referee: Laura Fortunato (Argentina)

Santa Fe	Corinthians

GK	12	(Colombia) Katherine Tapia
RB	20	(Venezuela) Nairelis Gutiérrez		(substituted off) 86'
RCB	5	(Venezuela) Nubiluz Rangel
LCB	14	(Colombia) Mónica Ramos
LB	6	(Colombia) Viviana Acosta
CDM	11	(Colombia) Liana Salazar	(yellow card) 35'
RAM	15	(Colombia) Gisela Robledo
LAM	10	(Paraguay) Fany Gauto (c)
RW	18	(Colombia) Kena Romero		(substituted off) 46'
LW	7	(Colombia) Diana Celis		(substituted off) 60'
CF	9	(Venezuela) Joemar Guarecuco		(substituted off) 60'
Substitutes:
GK	1	(Venezuela) Yessica Velásquez
DF	2	(Colombia) Johannys Muñoz
DF	3	(Colombia) Leivis Ramos		(substituted on) 86'
MF	13	(Colombia) Jessica Peña		(substituted on) 60'
FW	8	(Colombia) Nelly Córdoba
FW	16	(Colombia) Ivonne Chacón		(substituted on) 46'
FW	17	(Colombia) Yisela Cuesta		(substituted on) 60'
FW	19	(Colombia) Heidy Mosquera
Manager:
(Colombia) Albeiro Erazo

GK	12	(Brazil) Kemelli
RB	2	(Brazil) Katiuscia		(substituted off) 68'
RCB	4	(Brazil) Giovanna Campiolo
LCB	15	(Brazil) Yasmim	(yellow card) 26'
LB	6	(Brazil) Juliete
RCM	8	(Brazil) Diany		(substituted off) 78'
LCM	10	(Brazil) Gabi Zanotti
RW	18	(Brazil) Gabi Portilho		(substituted off) 86'
LW	14	(Brazil) Tamires (c)		(substituted off) 86'
RS	17	(Brazil) Victória		(substituted off) 68'
LS	16	(Brazil) Adriana
Substitutes:
GK	1	(Brazil) Natascha
DF	3	(Brazil) Pardal
DF	19	(Brazil) Poliana		(substituted on) 68'
MF	5	(Brazil) Ingryd		(substituted on) 78'
MF	7	(Brazil) Grazi		(substituted on) 86'
MF	20	(Brazil) Andressinha		(substituted on) 86'
FW	9	(Brazil) Jheniffer		(substituted on) 68'
FW	13	(Brazil) Cacau
Manager:
(Brazil) Arthur Elias

Final MVP Award:
Gabi Zanotti (Corinthians)

Assistant referees:
Mariana de Almeida (Argentina)
Daiana Milone (Argentina)
Fourth official:
Anahí Fernández (Uruguay)
Video assistant referee:
Salomé di Iorio (Argentina)
Assistant video assistant referees:
María Belén Carvajal (Chile)
Loreto Toloza (Chile)

Match rules

- 90 minutes.
- Penalty shoot-out if scores still level.
- Nine named substitutes.
- Maximum of five substitutions.

== Statistics ==
=== Top goalscorers ===
Rank	Player	Team	Goals
1	(Colombia) Tatiana Ariza	(Colombia) Deportivo Cali	4
1	(Colombia) Linda Caicedo	(Colombia) Deportivo Cali	4
1	(Brazil) Jheniffer	(Brazil) Corinthians	4
1	(Uruguay) Esperanza Pizarro	(Uruguay) Nacional	4
1	(Brazil) Victória	(Brazil) Corinthians	4
6	(Uruguay) Yamila Badell	(Uruguay) Nacional	3
6	(Paraguay) Rebeca Fernández	Universidad de Chile	3
6	(Brazil) Rafa Mineira	(Brazil) Ferroviária	3
6	(Ecuador) Madelin Riera	(Ecuador) Deportivo Cuenca	3
6	(Brazil) Tamires	(Brazil) Corinthians	3

=== Final ranking ===
As per statistical convention in football, matches decided in extra time were counted as wins and losses, while matches decided by penalty shoot-out were counted as draws.

Pos	Team	Pld	W	D	L	GF	GA	GD	Pts	Final result
1st place, gold medalist(s)	(Brazil) Corinthians	6	6	0	0	24	2	+22	18	Champions
2nd place, silver medalist(s)	(Colombia) Santa Fe	6	2	3	1	6	5	+1	9	Runners-up
3rd place, bronze medalist(s)	(Brazil) Ferroviária	6	3	3	0	10	3	+7	12	Third place
4	(Uruguay) Nacional	6	3	1	2	9	15	−6	10	Fourth place
5	(Brazil) Kindermann/Avaí	4	2	2	0	8	3	+5	8	Eliminated in Quarter-finals
6	(Colombia) Deportivo Cali	4	3	0	1	15	3	+12	9	Eliminated in Quarter-finals
7	(Peru) Alianza Lima	4	2	0	2	7	5	+2	6	Eliminated in Quarter-finals
8	(Paraguay) Cerro Porteño	4	2	0	2	4	5	−1	6	Eliminated in Quarter-finals
9	(Chile) Santiago Morning	3	1	1	1	5	2	+3	4	Eliminated in Group stage
10	Universidad de Chile	3	1	0	2	7	5	+2	3	Eliminated in Group stage
11	(Ecuador) Deportivo Cuenca	3	1	0	2	5	3	+2	3	Eliminated in Group stage
12	(Argentina) San Lorenzo	3	1	0	2	1	4	−3	3	Eliminated in Group stage
13	(Paraguay) Deportivo Capiatá	3	0	0	3	0	8	−8	0	Eliminated in Group stage
14	(Paraguay) Sol de América	3	0	0	3	0	9	−9	0	Eliminated in Group stage
15	(Venezuela) Yaracuyanos	3	0	0	3	1	11	−10	0	Eliminated in Group stage
16	(Bolivia) Real Tomayapo	3	0	0	3	0	19	−19	0	Eliminated in Group stage

Rules for classification: For 5th to 8th place. 1) Points in Quarter-finals; 2) Goal difference in Quarter-finals; 3) Goals scored in Quarter-finals; 4) Fewest red cards received in Quarter-finals; 5) Fewest yellow cards received in Quarter-finals; 6) Fewest red cards received in all matches; 7) Fewest yellow cards received in all matches.
For 9th to 16th place. 1) Points in group stage; 2) Goal difference; 3) Goals scored; 4) Fewest red cards received; 5) Fewest yellow cards received (Regulations Article 24).

=== 2021 Copa Libertadores Femenina team ===
The 2021 Copa Libertadores Femenina team was a squad consisting of the eleven most impressive players at the tournament.

Pos.	Player	Team
GK	(Colombia) Katherine Tapia	(Colombia) Santa Fe
DF	(Brazil) Poliana	(Brazil) Corinthians
DF	(Brazil) Giovanna Campiolo	(Brazil) Corinthians
DF	(Colombia) Kelly Caicedo	(Colombia) Deportivo Cali
DF	(Brazil) Tamires	(Brazil) Corinthians
MF	(Paraguay) Fany Gauto	(Colombia) Santa Fe
MF	(Brazil) Gabi Zanotti	(Brazil) Corinthians
MF	(Brazil) Victória	(Brazil) Corinthians
FW	(Brazil) Adriana	(Brazil) Corinthians
FW	(Colombia) Gisela Robledo	(Colombia) Santa Fe
FW	(Colombia) Linda Caicedo	(Colombia) Deportivo Cali

== See also ==
- 2021 AFC Women's Club Championship
  - 2021 WAFF Women's Clubs Championship
- 2021 CAF Women's Champions League
- 2020–21 UEFA Women's Champions League
- 2021 Copa Libertadores
