= 2022 Copa América Femenina =

International women's football competition

Tournament details
- Host country: Colombia
- Dates: 8–30 July
- Teams: 10 (from 1 confederation)
- Venues: 3 (in 3 host cities)

Final positions
- Champions: Brazil (8th title)
- Runners-up: Colombia
- Third place: Argentina
- Fourth place: Paraguay

Tournament statistics
- Matches played: 25
- Goals scored: 87 (3.48 per match)
- Attendance: 172,233 (6,889 per match)
- Top scorer: (Argentina) Yamila Rodríguez (6 goals)
- Best player: (Colombia) Linda Caicedo
- Best goalkeeper: (Brazil) Lorena
- Fair play award: Chile

The 2022 Copa América Femenina was the 9th edition of the main international women's football championship in South America, the Copa América Femenina, for national teams affiliated with CONMEBOL. The competition was held in Colombia from 8 to 30 July 2022.

The tournament acted as South American qualification for the 2023 FIFA Women's World Cup in Australia and New Zealand, providing three direct qualifying places and two play-off places for the Women's World Cup, and three more places for the 2023 Pan American Games women's football tournament in Chile (in addition to Chile who qualified automatically as hosts). In addition, the two finalists qualified for the women's football tournament at the 2024 Summer Olympics in France. The top four teams also qualified for the 2024 CONCACAF W Gold Cup in the United States. After this edition, the tournament would be held every two years instead of four in odd-number years, no longer a Women's World Cup qualifier anymore, and serve as a path to women's football at the Pan American Games and the Summer Olympics.

Brazil, the three-time defending champions, defeated Colombia 1–0 in the final to win their 8th title. As winners, they competed in the inaugural 2023 Women's Finalissima against England, winners of UEFA Women's Euro 2022.

== Teams ==
All ten CONMEBOL women's national teams were eligible to enter.

| Team | Appearance | Previous best performance | FIFA ranking at start of event |
|---|---|---|---|
| Argentina | 8th | Champions (2006) | 35 |
| Bolivia | 8th | Fifth place (1995) | 91 |
| Brazil (holders) | 9th | Champions (1991, 1995, 1998, 2003, 2010, 2014, 2018) | 9 |
| Chile | 9th | Runners-up (1991, 2018) | 38 |
| Colombia (hosts) | 7th | Runners-up (2010, 2014) | 28 |
| Ecuador | 8th | Third place (2014) | 68 |
| Paraguay | 7th | Fourth place (2006) | 50 |
| Peru | 7th | Third place (1998) | 66 |
| Uruguay | 7th | Third place (2006) | 71 |
| Venezuela | 8th | Third place (1991) | 52 |

== Venues ==
The venues were announced on 16 December 2021. The matches were played at stadiums in three Colombian cities: Cali, Bucaramanga and Armenia.

| Armenia | Bucaramanga | Cali | 2022 Copa América Femenina is located in Colombia |
|---|---|---|---|
| Estadio Centenario | Estadio Alfonso López | Estadio Pascual Guerrero | 2022 Copa América Femenina is located in Colombia |
| Capacity: 20,716 | Capacity: 28,000 | Capacity: 35,405 | 2022 Copa América Femenina is located in Colombia |

== Draw ==
The tournament draw was held on 7 April 2022, 11:00 COT (UTC−5), in Asunción, Paraguay.

| Seeds | Pot 1 | Pot 2 | Pot 3 | Pot 4 |
|---|---|---|---|---|
| Colombia (Group A); Brazil (Group B) | Chile; Argentina | Paraguay; Venezuela | Bolivia; Uruguay | Peru; Ecuador |

== Match officials ==
On 8 June 2022, CONMEBOL announced the list of match officials for the tournament.

Referees

- (Argentina) Laura Fortunato
- (Bolivia) Adriana Farfán
- (Brazil) Edina Alves Batista
- (Chile) María Belén Carvajal
- (Colombia) María Victoria Daza
- (Ecuador) Susana Corella
- (Paraguay) Zulma Quiñónez
- (Peru) Elizabeth Tintaya
- (Portugal) Sandra Braz
- (Uruguay) Anahí Fernández
- (Venezuela) Yercinia Correa

Assistant referees

- (Argentina) Mariana de Almeida
- (Argentina) Daiana Milone
- (Bolivia) Liliana Bejarano
- (Bolivia) Inés Choque
- (Brazil) Neuza Back
- (Brazil) Leila Moreira
- (Chile) Cindy Nahuelcoy
- (Chile) Loreto Toloza
- (Colombia) Nataly Arteaga
- (Colombia) Eliana Ortiz
- (Ecuador) Mónica Amboya
- (Ecuador) Viviana Segura
- (Paraguay) Laura Miranda
- (Paraguay) Nadia Weiler
- (Peru) Gabriela Moreno
- (Peru) Thyty Rodríguez (Note: Laura Cárdenas (Venezuela) was originally listed as an assistant referee but was replaced by Rodríguez.)
- (Peru) Vera Yupanqui
- (Portugal) Andreia Sousa
- (Spain) Rita Cabañero Mompó
- (Uruguay) Luciana Mascaraña
- (Uruguay) Adela Sánchez
- (Venezuela) Thaity Dugarte

== Group stage ==
The top two teams of each group advanced to the semi-finals, while the two third-placed teams advanced to the fifth place match.

All times are local, COT (UTC−5).

=== Tiebreakers ===
The teams were ranked according to points (3 points for a win, 1 point for a draw, and 0 points for a loss). If tied on points, the following criteria would be used to determine the ranking:

1. Points obtained in the matches played between the teams in question;
2. Goal difference in the matches played between the teams in question;
3. Number of goals scored in the matches played between the teams in question;
4. Goal difference in all group matches;
5. Number of goals scored in all group matches;
6. Fewest red cards;
7. Fewest yellow cards;
8. Drawing of lots.

=== Group A ===
| Pos | Team | Pld | W | D | L | GF | GA | GD | Pts | Qualification |
|---|---|---|---|---|---|---|---|---|---|---|
| 1 | Colombia (H) | 4 | 4 | 0 | 0 | 13 | 3 | +10 | 12 | Advance to semi-finals |
| 2 | Paraguay | 4 | 3 | 0 | 1 | 9 | 7 | +2 | 9 | Advance to semi-finals |
| 3 | Chile | 4 | 2 | 0 | 2 | 9 | 8 | +1 | 6 | Advance to fifth place match |
| 4 | Ecuador | 4 | 1 | 0 | 3 | 9 | 7 | +2 | 3 | |
| 5 | Bolivia | 4 | 0 | 0 | 4 | 1 | 16 | −15 | 0 | |

Source: CONMEBOL
Rules for classification: Group stage tiebreakers
(H) Hosts
8 July 2022
16:00

| Bolivia | 1–6 | Ecuador |
|---|---|---|
| É. Salvatierra 59' | Report (FIFA); Report (CONMEBOL) | Bolaños 19', 90+4'; Pesántez 37'; Aguirre 41'; Lattanzio 70'; Espinales 76' |

Estadio Pascual Guerrero, Cali
Attendance: 7,000
Referee: Anahí Fernández (Uruguay)
8 July 2022
19:00

| Colombia | 4–2 | Paraguay |
|---|---|---|
| Montoya 22', 59'; Ramírez 33'; Vanegas 82' | Report (FIFA); Report (CONMEBOL) | J. Martínez 27'; Gauto 90' |

Estadio Pascual Guerrero, Cali
Attendance: 15,000
Referee: Edina Alves Batista (Brazil)

11 July 2022
16:00

| Paraguay | 3–2 | Chile |
|---|---|---|
| Fernández 3'; J. Martínez 12'; Sandoval 56' | Report (FIFA); Report (CONMEBOL) | Pardo 34'; Acuña 90+2' |

Estadio Pascual Guerrero, Cali
Attendance: 1,500
Referee: Yercinia Correa (Venezuela)
11 July 2022
19:00

| Bolivia | 0–3 | Colombia |
|---|---|---|
| | Report (FIFA); Report (CONMEBOL) | Santos 21'; Morales 70' (o.g.); D. Arias 78' |

Estadio Pascual Guerrero, Cali
Attendance: 16,667
Referee: Elizabeth Tintaya (Peru)

14 July 2022
16:00

| Paraguay | 2–0 | Bolivia |
|---|---|---|
| R. Martínez 10'; Fernández 71' | Report (FIFA); Report (CONMEBOL) |

Estadio Pascual Guerrero, Cali
Attendance: 500
Referee: Anahí Fernández (Uruguay)
14 July 2022
19:00

| Chile | 2–1 | Ecuador |
|---|---|---|
| Sáez 40'; Acuña 76' | Report (FIFA); Report (CONMEBOL) | Aguirre 78' |

Estadio Pascual Guerrero, Cali
Attendance: 1,500
Referee: Edina Alves Batista (Brazil)

17 July 2022
16:00

| Chile | 5–0 | Bolivia |
|---|---|---|
| Lara 7', 45+1'; É. Salvatierra 14' (o.g.); Y. López 17'; Valencia 76' | Report (FIFA); Report (CONMEBOL) |

Estadio Pascual Guerrero, Cali
Attendance: 800
Referee: Elizabeth Tintaya (Peru)
17 July 2022
19:00

| Ecuador | 1–2 | Colombia |
|---|---|---|
| Charcopa 34' | Report (FIFA); Report (CONMEBOL) | Ramírez 30'; Caicedo 45' |

Estadio Pascual Guerrero, Cali
Attendance: 24,580
Referee: Laura Fortunato (Argentina)

20 July 2022
19:00

| Colombia | 4–0 | Chile |
|---|---|---|
| Usme 4'; D. Arias 11'; Vanegas 37'; Salazar 41' | Report (FIFA); Report (CONMEBOL) |

Estadio Centenario, Armenia
Attendance: 18,064
Referee: Anahí Fernández (Uruguay)
20 July 2022
19:00

| Ecuador | 1–2 | Paraguay |
|---|---|---|
| Real 45+1' | Report (FIFA); Report (CONMEBOL) | J. Martínez 30'; Chamorro 90+1' |

Estadio Pascual Guerrero, Cali
Attendance: 250
Referee: Yercinia Correa (Venezuela)

=== Group B ===
| Pos | Team | Pld | W | D | L | GF | GA | GD | Pts | Qualification |
|---|---|---|---|---|---|---|---|---|---|---|
| 1 | Brazil | 4 | 4 | 0 | 0 | 17 | 0 | +17 | 12 | Advance to semi-finals |
| 2 | Argentina | 4 | 3 | 0 | 1 | 10 | 4 | +6 | 9 | Advance to semi-finals |
| 3 | Venezuela | 4 | 2 | 0 | 2 | 3 | 5 | −2 | 6 | Advance to fifth place match |
| 4 | Uruguay | 4 | 1 | 0 | 3 | 6 | 9 | −3 | 3 | |
| 5 | Peru | 4 | 0 | 0 | 4 | 0 | 18 | −18 | 0 | |

Source: CONMEBOL
Rules for classification: Group stage tiebreakers
9 July 2022
16:00

| Uruguay | 0–1 | Venezuela |
|---|---|---|
| | Report (FIFA); Report (CONMEBOL) | Castellanos 78' |

Estadio Centenario, Armenia
Attendance: 3,000
Referee: María Victoria Daza (Colombia)
9 July 2022
19:00

| Brazil | 4–0 | Argentina |
|---|---|---|
| Adriana 28', 58'; Bia Zaneratto 36' (pen.); Debinha 87' | Report (FIFA); Report (CONMEBOL) |

Estadio Centenario, Armenia
Attendance: 5,000
Referee: María Belén Carvajal (Chile)

12 July 2022
16:00

| Uruguay | 0–3 | Brazil |
|---|---|---|
| | Report (FIFA); Report (CONMEBOL) | Adriana 32', 48'; Debinha 45+2' |

Estadio Centenario, Armenia
Attendance: 1,000
Referee: Zulma Quiñónez (Paraguay)
12 July 2022
19:00

| Argentina | 4–0 | Peru |
|---|---|---|
| Rodríguez 18'; Bonsegundo 52'; Stábile 62'; Lonigro 84' | Report (FIFA); Report (CONMEBOL) |

Estadio Centenario, Armenia
Attendance: 2,000
Referee: Susana Corella (Ecuador)

15 July 2022
16:00

| Argentina | 5–0 | Uruguay |
|---|---|---|
| Banini 43'; Rodríguez 51', 64', 69'; Stábile 90+5' | Report (FIFA); Report (CONMEBOL) |

Estadio Centenario, Armenia
Attendance: 1,000
Referee: María Victoria Daza (Colombia)
15 July 2022
19:00

| Peru | 0–2 | Venezuela |
|---|---|---|
| | Report (FIFA); Report (CONMEBOL) | Castellanos 39'; Altuve 64' |

Estadio Centenario, Armenia
Attendance: 5,000
Referee: Sandra Braz (Portugal)

18 July 2022
16:00

| Venezuela | 0–4 | Brazil |
|---|---|---|
| | Report (FIFA); Report (CONMEBOL) | Bia Zaneratto 22'; Ary Borges 51'; Debinha 58', 65' |

Estadio Centenario, Armenia
Attendance: 5,000
Referee: Zulma Quiñónez (Paraguay)
18 July 2022
19:00

| Peru | 0–6 | Uruguay |
|---|---|---|
| | Report (FIFA); Report (CONMEBOL) | Pa. González 51', 76'; Aquino 58'; Pizarro 61', 89'; Velazco 66' |

Estadio Centenario, Armenia
Attendance: 3,500
Referee: Adriana Farfán (Bolivia)

21 July 2022
19:00

| Brazil | 6–0 | Peru |
|---|---|---|
| Duda 1'; Duda Sampaio 17'; Geyse 41'; Duda Santos 44' (pen.); Fe Palermo 48'; Adriana 50' (pen.) | Report (FIFA); Report (CONMEBOL) |

Estadio Pascual Guerrero, Cali
Attendance: 1,500
Referee: Susana Corella (Ecuador)
21 July 2022
19:00

| Venezuela | 0–1 | Argentina |
|---|---|---|
| | Report (FIFA); Report (CONMEBOL) | Bonsegundo 63' |

Estadio Centenario, Armenia
Attendance: 3,000
Referee: Sandra Braz (Portugal)

== Knockout stage ==
In the knockout phase, if the fifth-place play-off, semi-finals and third-place play-off were level at the end of 90 minutes of normal playing time, no extra time would be played and the match would be decided by a direct penalty shoot-out. Only if the final was level at the end of the normal playing time, extra time would be played (two periods of 15 minutes each), where each team would be allowed to make an extra substitution. If still tied after extra time, the final would be decided by a penalty shoot-out to determine the champions.

=== Bracket ===
Semi-finals
25 July – Bucaramanga
Colombia | 1
Argentina | 0
26 July – Bucaramanga
Brazil | 2
Paraguay | 0

Final
30 July – Bucaramanga
Colombia | 0
Brazil | 1

| Fifth place match |
| 24 July – Armenia |
| Chile (p) | 1 (4) |
| Venezuela | 1 (2) |

| Third place match |
| 29 July – Armenia |
| Argentina | 3 |
| Paraguay | 1 |

=== Fifth place match ===
The winners of the fifth place match advanced to the inter-confederation play-offs.

24 July 2022
19:00

| Chile | 1–1 | Venezuela |
|---|---|---|
| Zamora 65' | Report (FIFA); Report (CONMEBOL) | Castellanos 90+2' |
Penalties
| Lara (penalty scored); Araya (penalty scored); Zamora (penalty scored); Balmaceda (penalty missed); Guerrero (penalty scored) | 4–2 | (penalty missed) Castellanos; (penalty missed) Moreno; (penalty scored) Altuve; (penalty scored) Viso |

Estadio Centenario, Armenia
Attendance: 2,283
Referee: Edina Alves Batista (Brazil)

=== Semi-finals ===
The winners of the semi-finals qualified for the 2023 FIFA Women's World Cup and the football tournament at the 2024 Summer Olympics.

25 July 2022
19:00

| Colombia | 1–0 | Argentina |
|---|---|---|
| Caicedo 63' | Report (FIFA); Report (CONMEBOL) |

Estadio Alfonso López, Bucaramanga
Attendance: 15,757
Referee: María Belén Carvajal (Chile)

26 July 2022
19:00

| Brazil | 2–0 | Paraguay |
|---|---|---|
| Ary Borges 16'; Bia Zaneratto 28' | Report (FIFA); Report (CONMEBOL) |

Estadio Alfonso López, Bucaramanga
Attendance: 5,832
Referee: Anahí Fernández (Uruguay)

=== Third place match ===
The winners of the third place match qualified for the 2023 FIFA Women's World Cup. The losers advanced to the inter-confederation play-offs.

29 July 2022
19:00

| Argentina | 3–1 | Paraguay |
|---|---|---|
| Rodríguez 78', 90+1'; Bonsegundo 90' | Report (FIFA); Report (CONMEBOL) | Núñez 39' (o.g.) |

Estadio Centenario, Armenia
Attendance: 4,500
Referee: María Victoria Daza (Colombia)

=== Final ===
30 July 2022
19:00

| Colombia | 0–1 | Brazil |
|---|---|---|
| | Report (FIFA); Report (CONMEBOL) | Debinha 39' (pen.) |

Estadio Alfonso López, Bucaramanga
Attendance: 28,000
Referee: Laura Fortunato (Argentina)

== Statistics ==
=== Goalscorers ===
There were 87 goals scored in 25 matches, for an average of 3.48 goals per match.

6 goals

- (Argentina) Yamila Rodríguez

5 goals

- (Brazil) Adriana
- (Brazil) Debinha

3 goals

- (Argentina) Florencia Bonsegundo
- (Brazil) Bia Zaneratto
- (Paraguay) Jessica Martínez
- (Venezuela) Deyna Castellanos

2 goals

- (Argentina) Eliana Stábile
- (Brazil) Ary Borges
- (Chile) Yenny Acuña
- (Chile) Francisca Lara
- (Colombia) Daniela Arias
- (Colombia) Linda Caicedo
- (Colombia) Daniela Montoya
- (Colombia) Mayra Ramírez
- (Colombia) Manuela Vanegas
- (Ecuador) Marthina Aguirre
- (Ecuador) Nayely Bolaños
- (Paraguay) Rebeca Fernández
- (Uruguay) Pamela González
- (Uruguay) Esperanza Pizarro

1 goal

- (Argentina) Estefanía Banini
- (Argentina) Érica Lonigro
- (Bolivia) Érika Salvatierra
- (Brazil) Duda
- (Brazil) Duda Sampaio
- (Brazil) Duda Santos
- (Brazil) Fe Palermo
- (Brazil) Geyse
- (Chile) Yessenia López
- (Chile) Daniela Pardo
- (Chile) Camila Sáez
- (Chile) Mary Valencia
- (Chile) Daniela Zamora
- (Colombia) Liana Salazar
- (Colombia) Leicy Santos
- (Colombia) Catalina Usme
- (Ecuador) Nicole Charcopa
- (Ecuador) Joselyn Espinales
- (Ecuador) Giannina Lattanzio
- (Ecuador) Danna Pesántez
- (Ecuador) Kerlly Real
- (Paraguay) Lice Chamorro
- (Paraguay) Fany Gauto
- (Paraguay) Ramona Martínez
- (Paraguay) Fabiola Sandoval
- (Uruguay) Belén Aquino
- (Uruguay) Ximena Velazco
- (Venezuela) Oriana Altuve

1 own goal

- (Argentina) Romina Núñez (against Paraguay)
- (Bolivia) Ericka Morales (against Colombia)
- (Bolivia) Érika Salvatierra (against Chile)

== Awards ==
2022 Copa América Femenina winners

Brazil
8th title

| Award | Winner |
|---|---|
| Golden Ball | (Colombia) Linda Caicedo |
| Top scorer | (Argentina) Yamila Rodríguez (6 goals) |
| Golden Glove | (Brazil) Lorena |
| Fair Play | Chile |

Best XI
| Goalkeeper | Defenders | Midfielders | Forwards |
|---|---|---|---|
| (Brazil) Lorena | (Brazil) Tamires; (Brazil) Rafaelle; (Argentina) Agustina Barroso; (Brazil) Antônia | (Colombia) Daniela Montoya; (Colombia) Catalina Usme; (Paraguay) Jessica Martínez | (Colombia) Linda Caicedo; (Brazil) Debinha; (Argentina) Yamila Rodríguez |

== Tournament teams ranking ==
This table shows the ranking of teams throughout the tournament.

| Pos | Team | Pld | W | D | L | GF | GA | GD | Pts | Final result |
|---|---|---|---|---|---|---|---|---|---|---|
| 1 | Brazil | 6 | 6 | 0 | 0 | 20 | 0 | +20 | 18 | Champions |
| 2 | Colombia (H) | 6 | 5 | 0 | 1 | 14 | 4 | +10 | 15 | Runners-up |
| 3 | Argentina | 6 | 4 | 0 | 2 | 13 | 6 | +7 | 12 | Third place |
| 4 | Paraguay | 6 | 3 | 0 | 3 | 10 | 12 | −2 | 9 | Fourth place |
| 5 | Chile | 5 | 2 | 1 | 2 | 10 | 9 | +1 | 7 | Fifth place |
| 6 | Venezuela | 5 | 2 | 1 | 2 | 4 | 6 | −2 | 7 | Sixth place |
| 7 | Ecuador | 4 | 1 | 0 | 3 | 9 | 7 | +2 | 3 | Eliminated in group stage |
| 8 | Uruguay | 4 | 1 | 0 | 3 | 6 | 9 | −3 | 3 | Eliminated in group stage |
| 9 | Bolivia | 4 | 0 | 0 | 4 | 1 | 16 | −15 | 0 | Eliminated in group stage |
| 10 | Peru | 4 | 0 | 0 | 4 | 0 | 18 | −18 | 0 | Eliminated in group stage |

Source: CONMEBOL
(H) Hosts

== Qualification for international tournaments ==
=== Qualified teams for the 2023 FIFA Women's World Cup ===
The following three teams from CONMEBOL qualified for the 2023 FIFA Women's World Cup, while two teams advanced to the inter-confederation play-offs.

| Team | Qualified on | Previous appearances in FIFA Women's World Cup^{1} |
|---|---|---|
| Colombia | 25 July 2022 | 2 (2011, 2015) |
| Brazil | 26 July 2022 | 8 (1991, 1995, 1999, 2003, 2007, 2011, 2015, 2019) |
| Argentina | 29 July 2022 | 3 (2003, 2007, 2019) |

^{1} Italic indicates hosts for that year.

=== Qualified teams for the 2024 Summer Olympics ===
The following two teams from CONMEBOL qualified for the 2024 Summer Olympic women's football tournament in France.

| Team | Qualified on | Previous appearances in Summer Olympics^{2} |
|---|---|---|
| Colombia | 25 July 2022 | 2 (2012, 2016) |
| Brazil | 26 July 2022 | 7 (1996, 2000, 2004, 2008, 2012, 2016, 2020) |

^{2} Italic indicates hosts for that year.

=== Qualified teams for the 2023 Pan American Games ===
The following four teams from CONMEBOL qualified for the 2023 Pan American Games women's football tournament, including Chile which qualified as hosts.

| Team | Qualified on | Previous appearances in Pan American Games^{3} |
|---|---|---|
| Chile | 4 November 2017 | 1 (2011) |
| ~~Venezuela~~^{[a]} | ~~21 July 2022~~ | ~~0 (debut)~~ |
| Argentina | 25 July 2022 | 5 (2003, 2007, 2011, 2015, 2019) |
| Paraguay | 26 July 2022 | 2 (2007, 2019) |
| Bolivia^{[a]} | 10 October 2023 | 0 (debut) |

^{a} Bolivia replaced Venezuela in the 2023 Pan American Games
^{3} Italic indicates hosts for that year.

== Symbols ==
=== Mascot ===
The tournament's mascot is named Alma, a domestic dog who is "a strong, brave, sociable, fun-loving person with a passion for soccer." Therefore, she was not well received in Colombia, sparking controversy on social media over her description being considered "degrading."

=== Theme song ===
The official song of the tournament was "Rockstar" by Puerto Rican duo Domino Saints, which was performed during the tournament's opening ceremony in Cali and also at the closing ceremony held in Bucaramanga, respectively.

=== Match ball ===
Nike provided the official Aerow ball for the tournament and also carried out activities to promote sports and gender equality.
