= Linda Caicedo =

Colombian footballer (born 2005)

- Caicedo with Colombia in 2026

Personal information
- Full name: Linda Lizeth Caicedo Alegría
- Date of birth: 22 February 2005 (age 21)
- Place of birth: Candelaria, Valle del Cauca, Colombia
- Height: 1.62 m (5 ft 4 in)
- Position: Striker

Team information
- Current team: Real Madrid
- Number: 18

Youth career
- 2011–2016: Real Juanchito
- 2016–2017: Generaciones Palmiranas
- 2017–2019: CD Atlas CP

Senior career*
Years	Team	Apps	(Gls)
2019	América de Cali	7	(7)
2020–2023	Deportivo Cali	37	(16)
2023–	Real Madrid	87	(19)

International career^{‡}
2022	Colombia U17	11	(9)
2022	Colombia U20	4	(2)
2019–	Colombia	61	(20)
Medal record
Representing Colombia
CONMEBOL Women's Nations League
Winner	2025–26
Copa América Femenina
Runner-up	2022 Colombia
Runner-up	2025 Ecuador
FIFA U-17 World Cup
Runner-up	India 2022
South American U-17 Championship
Runner-up	Uruguay 2022
- * Club domestic league appearances and goals as of 31 August 2026 ‡ National team caps and goals as of 9 June 2026

Linda Lizeth Caicedo Alegría (Latin American Spanish: [ˈlin.da liˈset kaiˈse.ðo a.leˈɣɾi.a]; (Note: Specifically the pronunciation used in Colombian Spanish.) born 22 February 2005) is a Colombian professional footballer who plays as a striker for Liga F club Real Madrid and the Colombia national team.

Caicedo made her senior debut for América de Cali at the age of 14 in 2019, finishing that season as the Colombian league's top scorer and scoring the goal that won the club its first league title. She was diagnosed with ovarian cancer early in 2020, returned to football after chemotherapy, and won a second league title with Deportivo Cali in 2021 before finishing as joint top scorer of the 2021 Copa Libertadores Femenina. She joined Real Madrid in February 2023, played in the Copa de la Reina final that May, and has since been a regular in their UEFA Women's Champions League campaigns; in November 2025 she extended her contract until 2031, and in July 2026 she was named one of the squad's four captains.

At international level, Caicedo was named the best player of the 2022 Copa América Femenina, where Colombia finished as runners-up, and won the Silver Ball as captain of the under-17 side that lost the 2022 FIFA U-17 Women's World Cup final to Spain. In 2023 she played at her third FIFA World Cup in less than a year, and her goal against Germany at the 2023 FIFA Women's World Cup was voted the Goal of the Tournament. She played at the 2024 Summer Olympics, scored in the 2025 Copa América Femenina final, and helped Colombia win the inaugural CONMEBOL Women's Nations League in 2026, a campaign that also secured qualification for the 2027 FIFA Women's World Cup. Her individual honours include the 2023 Golden Girl award, a ninth-place finish in the 2023 Ballon d'Or Féminin, selection to the 2024 FIFPRO Women's World 11 and the 2025 Trofeo EFE.

== Early life ==
Caicedo was born in Candelaria, in the Valle del Cauca department of Colombia, and is the youngest daughter of Mauro Caicedo and Herlinda Alegría. Her mother has recalled that as a young girl Caicedo showed little interest in dolls and would instead kick them, along with kitchen utensils, around the house as if they were footballs. At the age of five she began playing at Real Juanchito, a club in the village of Villagorgona that had until then been open only to boys. There she was coached by Diego Fernando Vásquez and came under the guidance of the club's president, Rafael Murillo, who became her mentor.

At the age of ten Caicedo joined her first girls' team, Generaciones Palmiranas, where she came to the attention of Fabián Taborda, who was then the head coach of Colombia's senior women's team. A year later she moved to CD Atlas C.P., a youth club in Cali founded by the Colombian international Carolina Pineda, and between 2017 and 2019 she won three national under-13 tournaments with the team. Those results drew interest from Colombia's leading women's clubs, and Pineda persuaded Marcela Gómez, the president of América de Cali's women's team, to sign her.

== Club career ==
=== América de Cali (2019) ===
Caicedo made her professional debut for América de Cali against Cortuluá on 15 July 2019, aged 14, and scored the only goal of the match. She finished the 2019 Colombian Women's Football League as its top scorer with seven goals in seven matches. On 30 September 2019, in the second leg of the final against Independiente Medellín, she scored the goal that gave América a 3–2 aggregate victory and the club's first league title. Reaching the final qualified América for the 2019 Copa Libertadores Femenina, but Caicedo was ineligible to take part because the competition's minimum age was 16. América and Caicedo were unable to agree terms on a new contract, which the club attributed to her salary demands, and it confirmed her departure on 30 January 2020.

=== Deportivo Cali (2020–2022) ===
On 4 February 2020, Caicedo joined América's cross-city rivals Deportivo Cali on a one-year contract. Within weeks she was diagnosed with ovarian cancer, and her treatment kept her out of football for around six months; she resumed training days after completing her final round of chemotherapy. She made her debut for Cali on 20 October 2020 in a home defeat to Junior in the opening match of the 2020 Colombian Women's Football League, and her only goal of the group stage came in a 3–0 win over her former club, América. Cali won their group and met Millonarios in the quarter-finals, where Caicedo scored the winner in a 2–1 first-leg victory and Cali's only goal of the return match, but Millonarios won the second leg 3–1 to go through 4–3 on aggregate.

Caicedo opened her 2021 league account with two goals against Atlético Bucaramanga in the group stage. Cali again topped their group and reached the final against Santa Fe, in which Caicedo scored once in the first leg in Bogotá and twice in the second as Cali won 6–3 on aggregate to claim the first league title in their history; her five goals made her the team's second-highest scorer of the campaign. The title took Cali into the 2021 Copa Libertadores Femenina, Caicedo's first continental club competition, where she scored twice in an 8–0 win over the Bolivian club Real Tomayapo and once in a 4–1 win over Universidad de Chile. Cali won Group C but lost 2–1 to the Uruguayan side Nacional in the quarter-finals, with Caicedo scoring their goal. Her four goals left her level as the tournament's top scorer with Esperanza Pizarro, Victória, Jheniffer and her Cali teammate Tatiana Ariza, and she was named in the team of the tournament selected by CONMEBOL's technical study group.

The 2022 league switched to a round-robin format, and Cali finished third to qualify for the knockout rounds. Caicedo scored in the first leg of a 3–2 aggregate quarter-final win over Millonarios, scored again in the first leg of the semi-final against Santa Fe, and converted the decisive kick when that tie went to a penalty shoot-out. In the final against América she scored in the second leg, but Cali lost 4–3 on aggregate in what proved to be her last match for the club. The DIMAYOR cancelled the second half of the 2022 women's season because too few clubs had registered, and her commitments at the 2022 FIFA U-17 Women's World Cup ruled her out of Cali's 2022 Copa Libertadores campaign, which was played the same month. Her contract expired in December 2022, leaving her a free agent. In January 2023 she said she had long dreamed of playing abroad and intended to do so once she turned 18 that February, amid reported interest from Chelsea, Manchester City, Real Madrid and Barcelona; Barcelona's president Joan Laporta had confirmed in November 2022 that his club had been in contact with her.

=== Real Madrid (2023–present) ===
==== 2023–2024 ====
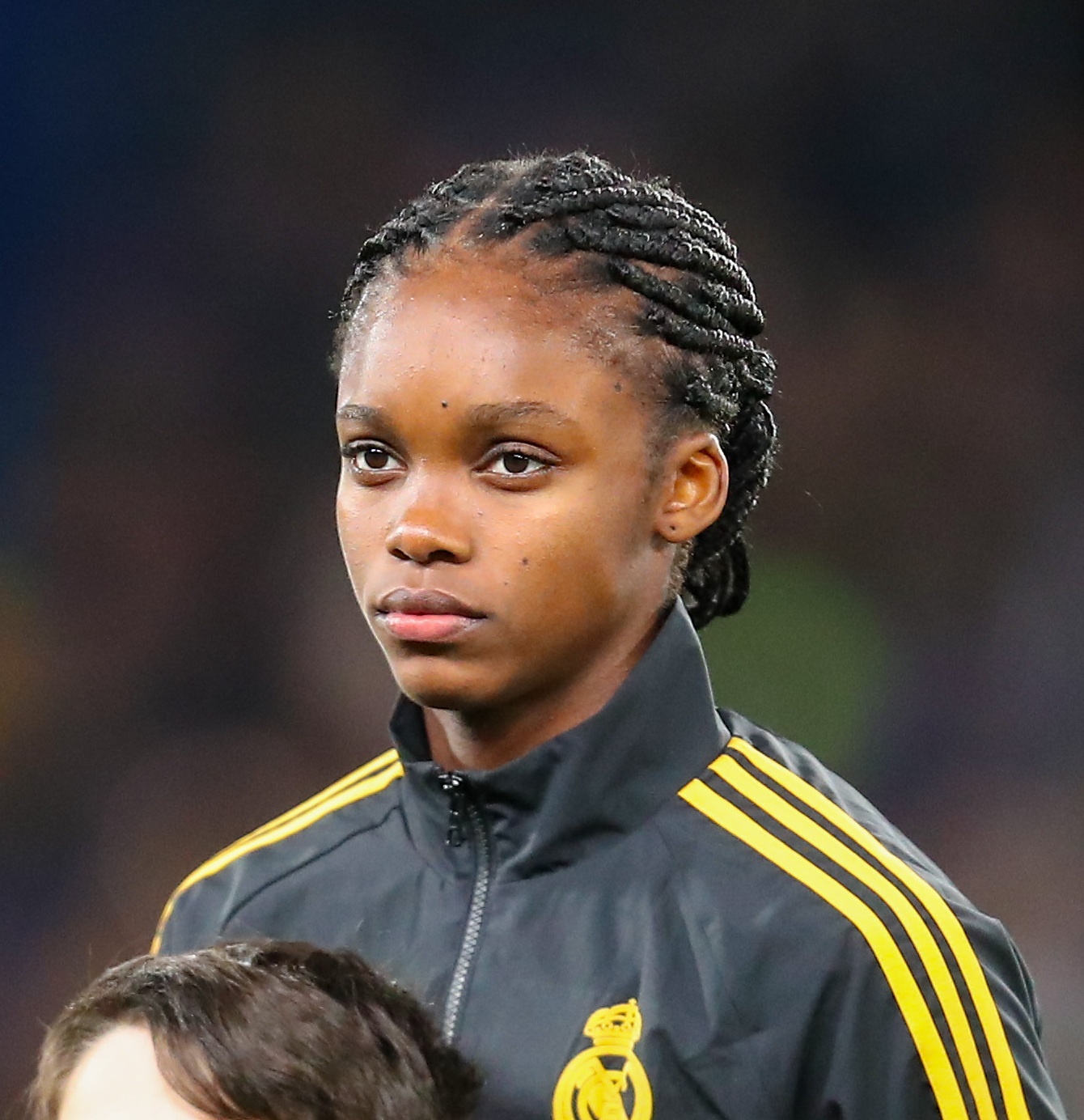
Caicedo with Real Madrid in 2024

After Spanish media reported on 21 February 2023 that Caicedo had chosen Real Madrid over Chelsea and Barcelona, the club announced her signing on a three-year contract on 24 February, two days after her 18th birthday. She made her debut against Alhama CF on 4 March 2023, and five days later scored her first goal for the club in extra time of the Copa de la Reina quarter-final to put Madrid into the semi-finals. Her first league goal followed in a 3–1 win over Levante Las Planas. Before the Copa de la Reina final, coach Alberto Toril praised her ability to unbalance defences, and she started the final against Atlético Madrid on 27 May 2023; she was substituted in the 82nd minute, and Atlético equalised deep in stoppage time before winning on penalties. She ended her first half-season with two goals and four assists in ten league appearances.

Caicedo made her UEFA Women's Champions League debut on 11 October 2023 in the second qualifying round against Vålerenga, a tie Madrid won 5–1 on aggregate to reach the group stage. In October 2023 she finished ninth in the voting for the Ballon d'Or Féminin, and on 17 November she received Tuttosport's Golden Girl award as the best under-21 female player in Europe. Two days later she damaged ligaments in her right ankle late in a match against Barcelona, and the injury kept her out for around a month; she returned as a substitute on 20 December in a 1–0 home defeat to Paris FC that left Madrid bottom of their Champions League group. In December 2023 she was one of three finalists for The Best FIFA Women's Player, alongside Aitana Bonmatí and Jennifer Hermoso. She was also named in the IFFHS Women's World Team for 2023 and was nominated for the Laureus World Sports Award for Breakthrough of the Year in 2024, while Madrid finished the 2023–24 Liga F season as runners-up to Barcelona.

==== 2024–25 season ====
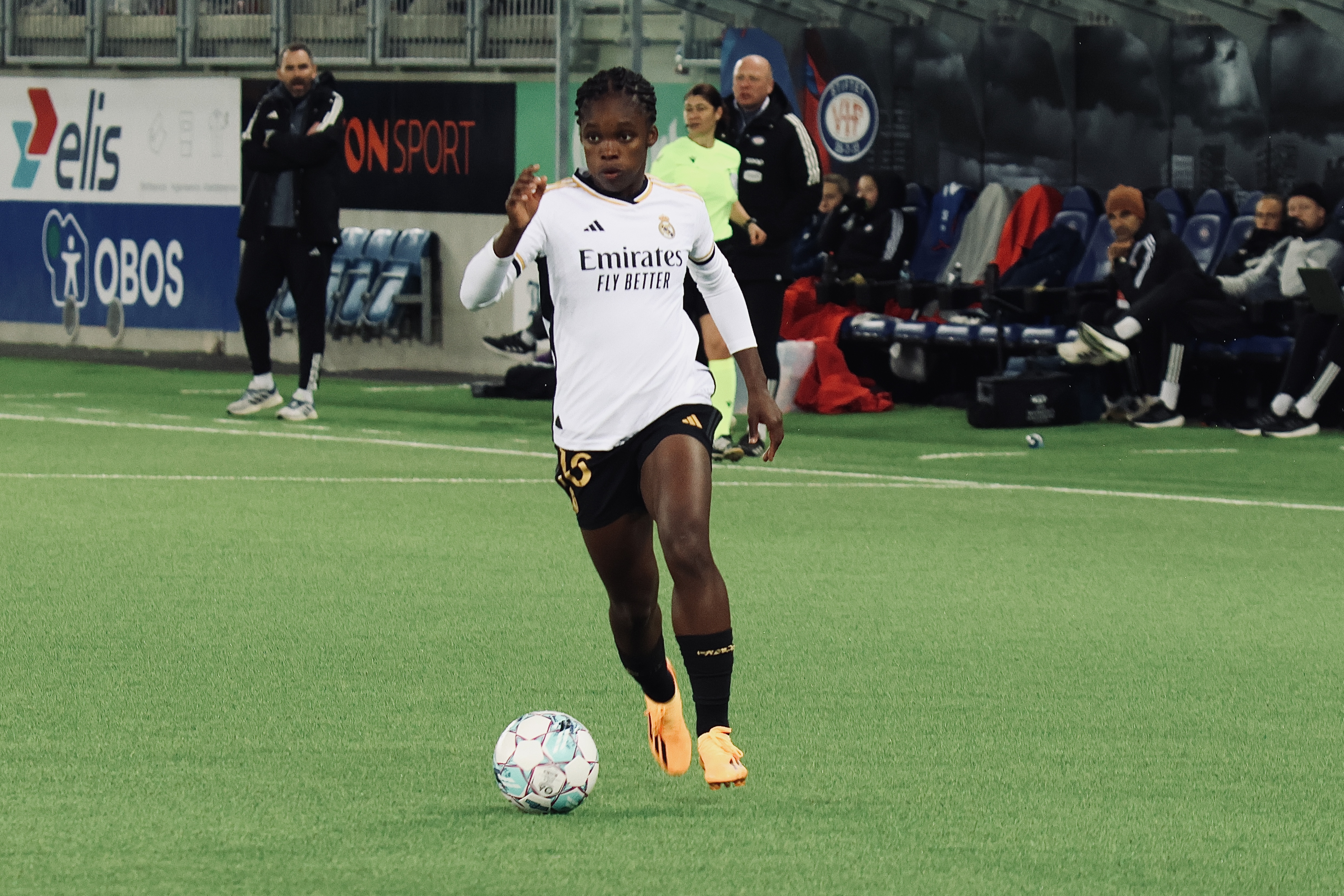
Caicedo playing for Real Madrid against Vålerenga in the Champions League, 2023

Caicedo scored three goals in the 2024–25 UEFA Women's Champions League group stage: she came off the bench to score in a 3–2 defeat to Chelsea at Stamford Bridge on 8 October 2024, set up Caroline Weir's opener and scored a penalty in a 4–0 win over Celtic nine days later, and on 20 November equalised on the stroke of half-time and assisted Signe Bruun's winner as Madrid came from behind to beat Twente 3–2 and qualify for the quarter-finals. In December 2024 she was selected as a forward in the FIFPRO Women's World 11. In January 2025 she scored in a 2–1 league win away to Atlético Madrid and was then named player of the match in a 3–2 Supercopa de España semi-final win over Real Sociedad on 23 January, in which she set up one goal and scored another; Barcelona beat Madrid 5–0 in the final three days later, the club's first appearance in the competition's final. Her form that month earned her the first Liga F Player of the Month award, presented for January 2025.

On 18 March 2025, Caicedo scored the opening goal of a 2–0 home win over Arsenal in the first leg of the Champions League quarter-finals, but Arsenal won the return match 3–0 at the Emirates Stadium on 26 March to progress 3–2 on aggregate. At the end of the season she was named in the Liga F Team of the Season, alongside her Madrid teammates Weir and Maëlle Lakrar.

==== 2025–present ====
In September 2025 Caicedo finished second to Vicky López in the voting for the inaugural women's Kopa Trophy, awarded to the best player under the age of 21. On 24 November 2025, Real Madrid extended her contract until 30 June 2031, and on 6 December she made her 100th appearance for the club in a 1–0 league win over Real Sociedad. Three days later she ran clear from the halfway line and rounded the goalkeeper to score in a 2–0 Champions League win over Wolfsburg, and on 20 December she scored twice in a 4–0 win over Espanyol in the round of 16 of the Copa de la Reina. Madrid finished seventh in the Champions League league phase, and in the knockout play-off against Paris FC she provided an assist and scored late in a 3–2 away win on 11 February 2026 as Madrid progressed 5–2 on aggregate. She scored both of Madrid's goals in a 6–2 home defeat to Barcelona in the first leg of the quarter-finals on 25 March, and Barcelona won the second leg 6–0 to eliminate them.

Barcelona also ended Madrid's domestic cup ambitions that season. Caicedo scored in a 3–1 win over Atlético Madrid in the Supercopa semi-final on 20 January 2026, but Madrid lost the final 2–0 to Barcelona four days later, and Barcelona knocked them out of the Copa de la Reina with a 4–0 quarter-final win on 5 February. In February 2026 she received the Trofeo EFE as the best Ibero-American female player of 2025. She captained Madrid for the first time in a 1–1 league draw with Dux Logroño in April, scoring the team's goal, and the club secured second place in Liga F with a win at Badalona in May. Having scored 13 goals in 41 matches across all competitions, she was voted the club's player of the season, after also winning its monthly award for September 2025, December 2025 and March 2026.

Ahead of the 2026–27 season, Real Madrid named Caicedo one of the squad's four captains, alongside Athenea del Castillo, Bruun and Sandie Toletti. On 2 September 2026, she came off the bench against Ajax in the third qualifying round of the Champions League and scored an individual goal in stoppage time to complete a 2–1 win, sealing a 4–1 aggregate victory and Madrid's place in the league phase.

== International career ==
=== Youth ===
Caicedo represented Colombia at three youth tournaments in 2022: the South American Under-17 Championship in Uruguay, the FIFA U-20 Women's World Cup in Costa Rica and the FIFA U-17 Women's World Cup in India. She scored at the U-20 World Cup, and in October 2022 she captained the under-17 side in India, wearing the number 10 shirt. Her four goals in India, two against China and one each against Mexico and Tanzania, helped Colombia reach the final, which they lost 1–0 to Spain on 30 October; she received the tournament's Silver Ball as its second-best player and the Bronze Boot as its third-highest scorer. In December 2022 the IFFHS named her the world's best female youth (under-20) player of the year.

=== Senior ===
==== Early caps and 2022 Copa América ====
Caicedo received her first senior call-up in November 2019, while still at América de Cali. Her first major senior tournament was the 2022 Copa América Femenina, which Colombia hosted. She scored the winning goal in a 2–1 group-stage victory over Ecuador, and in the semi-final in Bucaramanga on 25 July 2022 she scored the only goal against Argentina to send Colombia into their third Copa América final. Colombia lost the final 1–0 to Brazil, but Caicedo was voted the best player of the tournament and was one of three Colombians in its team of the tournament. In March 2023 she was voted the 2022 Reina de América, the South American women's footballer of the year award organised by the Uruguayan newspaper El País.

==== 2023 World Cup ====
In February 2023 she scored the winner in a 1–0 victory over Nigeria at the 2023 Women's Revelations Cup in Mexico and was named the best player of the tournament, in which Colombia finished second. Caicedo was named in Colombia's squad for the 2023 FIFA Women's World Cup on 4 July 2023, her third World Cup squad at under-17, under-20 or senior level in less than twelve months. She scored in Colombia's opening match, a 2–0 win over South Korea in Sydney on 25 July, and with that goal became the first Colombian to score at under-17, under-20 and senior Women's World Cups. Three days later she collapsed during a training session, but she was soon reported to have recovered. On 30 July she opened the scoring against Germany in the 52nd minute with a shot into the corner of the net, and Colombia won 2–1 in one of the tournament's biggest upsets; she was named player of the match. Her first coach, Diego Vásquez, told AFP that Caicedo was "one of these people who was touched by God, who was born for this". She started the round-of-16 win over Jamaica on 8 August, which took Colombia to their first World Cup quarter-final, and the quarter-final against England in Sydney four days later, which Colombia lost 2–1. Her goal against Germany won the Goal of the Tournament award in a public vote, and it was also shortlisted for the 2023 FIFA Puskás Award.

==== 2024 Gold Cup and Olympics ====
At the 2024 CONCACAF W Gold Cup in the United States, Caicedo scored in group-stage wins over Panama (6–0) on 21 February 2024 and Puerto Rico (2–0) on 27 February. Colombia were eliminated by the United States, who won their quarter-final 3–0 in Los Angeles on 3 March.

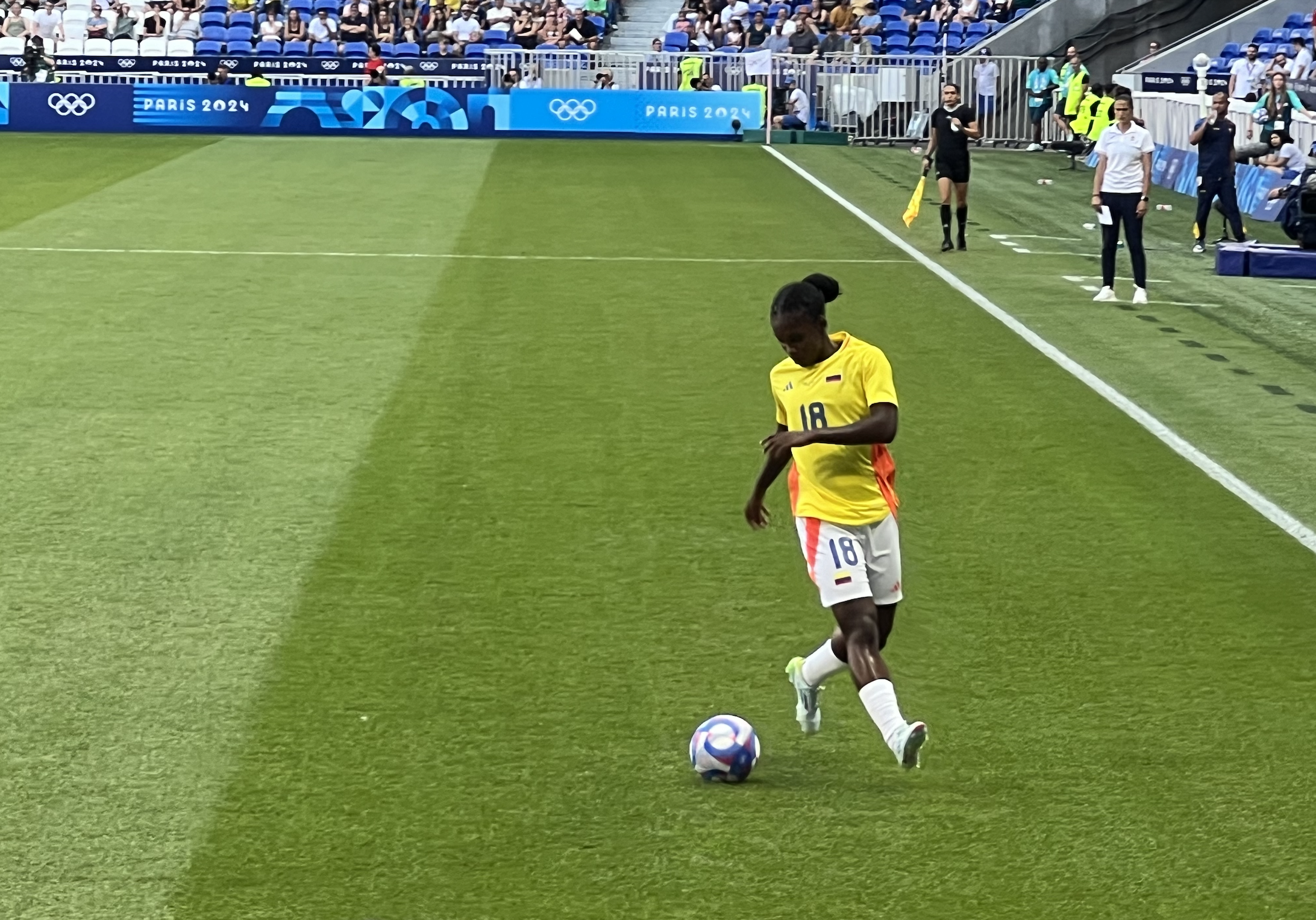
Caicedo attacking against Spain in the Olympic quarter-final, 2024

On 5 July 2024 she was named in Colombia's squad for the Olympic women's football tournament in France. Colombia lost their opening match 3–2 to France, beat New Zealand 2–0 with Caicedo in the starting line-up, and advanced as one of the best third-placed teams despite a 1–0 defeat to Canada, reaching the Olympic quarter-finals for the first time. In the quarter-final against Spain in Lyon on 3 August, Caicedo started and was substituted in the 66th minute with Colombia leading 2–0, but Spain recovered to draw 2–2 after extra time and won the shoot-out 4–2.

==== 2025 Copa América ====
Caicedo scored in a 4–1 defeat to Japan at the 2025 SheBelieves Cup on 23 February 2025. At the 2025 Copa América Femenina in Ecuador, she opened the scoring in a 4–1 win over Paraguay on 19 July and was named player of the match, then scored in an 8–0 win over Bolivia three days later. She converted her kick when the semi-final against Argentina ended 0–0 and Colombia won the shoot-out 5–4, a result that also qualified them for the 2028 Summer Olympics. In the final against Brazil in Quito on 2 August, Caicedo scored the opening goal in the 25th minute and set up Mayra Ramírez's goal late in normal time; the match finished 4–4 after extra time, and Brazil won the shoot-out 5–4 despite Caicedo scoring her penalty. She was named in the team of the tournament alongside her compatriots Katherine Tapia and Ramírez.

==== Nations League title ====
Caicedo played throughout Colombia's campaign in the inaugural CONMEBOL Women's Nations League, which served as the continent's qualifying competition for the 2027 FIFA Women's World Cup. During a break in the competition, she scored the only goal of a 1–0 win over Argentina at the 2026 SheBelieves Cup on 4 March 2026, chipping the goalkeeper after a pass from Leicy Santos. When the Nations League resumed, she scored the opening goal with a solo run in a 2–0 win over Chile in Cali on 14 April and won the stoppage-time penalty from which Manuela Vanegas scored the second. She started the 1–0 win over Uruguay in Cali on 5 June that secured Colombia's place at the World Cup. Four days later, in the final match against Paraguay in Asunción, her second-half goal levelled the score at 3–3 before Ana María Guzmán scored a late winner, and the 4–3 victory that made Colombia the first champions of the competition.

== Style of play ==
Caicedo is a right-footed forward who most often plays on the left wing, from where she cuts inside onto her stronger foot, though she has also been deployed on the right, as a centre-forward and as an attacking midfielder. She carries the ball with short, rapid touches using both the inside and outside of her foot, and she beats opponents in one-on-one situations through sudden changes of direction and pace, often on diagonal runs that take her past several defenders. Her acceleration, her ability to finish with either foot and her willingness to press and track back are further strengths, while the weight and accuracy of her passing were identified as areas for development when she arrived in Spain. At Real Madrid she has evolved from a direct, goal-focused winger into a player who also controls the tempo of attacks, drifting infield from the left to combine with teammates. Pineda, the founder of Atlas, has compared her with Neymar for her dribbling and changes of speed, and Toril described her during her first season in Madrid as a talented player capable of unbalancing defences.

== Outside football ==
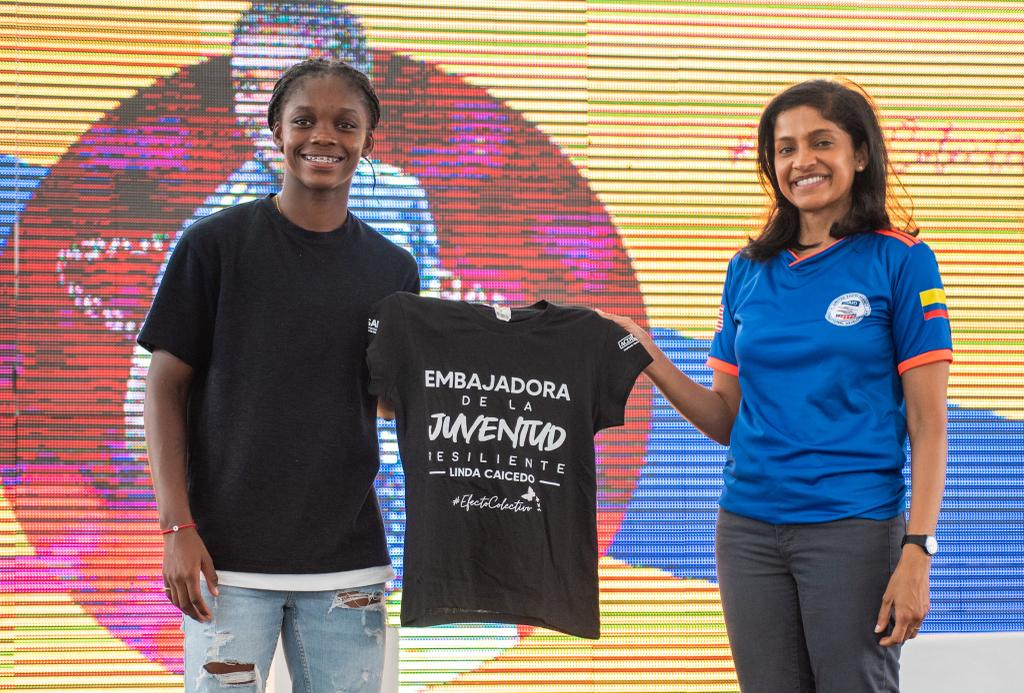
Caicedo in 2023 with Anu Rajaraman, the USAID mission director in Colombia

In November 2022 Caicedo became an ambassador for Fundación Mi Sangre, a peace-building foundation co-founded by the singer Juanes that works with young Colombians on leadership and entrepreneurial skills. In February 2023, at a ceremony in Tumaco, the United States Embassy and USAID named her the first Ambassador of Resilient Youth, a role tied to a programme working with around 14,000 young people in 30 Colombian municipalities. She has also campaigned against marine plastic pollution.

Caicedo has a sponsorship agreement with Adidas, which she renewed in April 2023. In February 2024 she appeared alongside Lionel Messi, Patrick Mahomes, Trinity Rodman and Jude Bellingham in the brand's "You Got This" campaign, launched ahead of Super Bowl LVIII, and in June 2024 she was one of four players chosen to promote its F50 boot alongside Messi.

== Personal life ==
Shortly after her 15th birthday, early in 2020, Caicedo began to suffer abdominal pain that was initially misdiagnosed as gastritis. She was diagnosed with ovarian cancer in February 2020 and had surgery to remove the tumour the following month. Six months of chemotherapy followed, during which she was confined to bed for three months, and she was declared cancer-free in September 2020. She has said that she struggled with her mental health during her recovery and sought help from Deportivo Cali's psychologists, and her final check-up, in November 2021, came after months of follow-up appointments disrupted by the 2021 Colombian protests.

Caicedo has come out as gay, and in 2023 AFP described her as a prominent figure for Colombia's LGBTQ+ community.

== Career statistics ==
=== International ===
As of 9 June 2026

Appearances and goals by national team and year
National team	Year	Apps	Goals
Colombia	2019	1	0
Colombia	2021	5	1
Colombia	2022	9	3
Colombia	2023	13	3
Colombia	2024	11	5
Colombia	2025	14	5
Colombia	2026	8	3
Total		61	20

Scores and results list Colombia's goal tally first,score column indicates score after each Caicedo goal

List of international goals scored by Linda Caicedo
No.	Date	Venue	Opponent	Score	Result	Competition
1	23 October 2021	Estadio Olímpico Pascual Guerrero, Cali, Colombia	Chile	1–0	2–0	Friendly
2	17 July 2022	Estadio Olímpico Pascual Guerrero, Cali, Colombia	Ecuador	2–1	2–1	2022 Copa América Femenina
3	25 July 2022	Estadio Alfonso López, Bucaramanga, Colombia	Argentina	1–0	1–0	2022 Copa América Femenina
4	6 September 2022	Estadio Olímpico Pascual Guerrero, Cali, Colombia	Costa Rica	2–0	2–0	Friendly
5	18 February 2023	Estadio León, León, Mexico	Nigeria	1–0	1–0	2023 Women's Revelations Cup
6	25 July 2023	Sydney Football Stadium, Sydney, Australia	South Korea	2–0	2–0	2023 FIFA Women's World Cup
7	30 July 2023	Sydney Football Stadium, Sydney, Australia	Germany	1–0	2–1	2023 FIFA Women's World Cup
8	21 February 2024	Snapdragon Stadium, San Diego, United States	Panama	5–0	6–0	2024 CONCACAF W Gold Cup
9	27 February 2024	Snapdragon Stadium, San Diego, United States	Puerto Rico	2–0	2–0	2024 CONCACAF W Gold Cup
10	30 May 2024	Estadio Metropolitano de Lara, Barquisimeto, Venezuela	Venezuela	1–0	2–0	Friendly
11	30 May 2024	Estadio Metropolitano de Lara, Barquisimeto, Venezuela	Venezuela	2–0	2–0	Friendly
12	29 October 2024	Estádio Kleber Andrade, Cariacica, Brazil	Brazil	1–2	1–3	Friendly
13	23 February 2025	State Farm Stadium, Glendale, United States	Japan	1–2	1–4	2025 SheBelieves Cup
14	19 July 2025	Estadio Gonzalo Pozo Ripalda, Quito, Ecuador	Paraguay	1–0	4–1	2025 Copa América Femenina
15	19 July 2025	Estadio Gonzalo Pozo Ripalda, Quito, Ecuador	Paraguay	3–1 (Note: CONMEBOL's official match report records Colombia's third goal against Paraguay as an own goal by Camila Arrieta; Colombian media credited it to Caicedo as a deflected shot.)	4–1	2025 Copa América Femenina
16	22 July 2025	Estadio Gonzalo Pozo Ripalda, Quito, Ecuador	Bolivia	5–0	8–0	2025 Copa América Femenina
17	2 August 2025	Estadio Rodrigo Paz Delgado, Quito, Ecuador	Brazil	1–0	4–4 (a.e.t.) (4–5 p)	2025 Copa América Femenina
18	4 March 2026	ScottsMiracle-Gro Field, Columbus, Ohio, United States	Argentina	1–0	1–0	2026 SheBelieves Cup
19	14 April 2026	Estadio Olímpico Pascual Guerrero, Cali, Colombia	Chile	1–0	2–0	2025–26 CONMEBOL Women's Nations League
20	9 June 2026	Estadio Defensores del Chaco, Asunción, Paraguay	Paraguay	3–3	4–3	2025–26 CONMEBOL Women's Nations League

== Honours ==
América de Cali

- Colombian Women's Football League: 2019

Deportivo Cali

- Colombian Women's Football League: 2021; runner-up: 2022

Real Madrid

- Copa de la Reina runner-up: 2022–23
- Supercopa de España Femenina runner-up: 2024–25, 2025–26

Colombia U17

- FIFA U-17 Women's World Cup runner-up: 2022

Colombia

- CONMEBOL Women's Nations League: 2025–26
- Copa América Femenina runner-up: 2022, 2025

Individual

- Colombian Women's Football League top scorer: 2019
- Premios Fémina Fútbol Revelation of the Year: 2019
- Premios Fémina Fútbol Team of the Year: 2021
- Copa Libertadores Femenina top scorer: 2021 (shared)
- Copa Libertadores Femenina team of the tournament: 2021
- Copa América Femenina best player: 2022
- Copa América Femenina team of the tournament: 2022, 2025
- FIFA U-17 Women's World Cup Silver Ball: 2022
- FIFA U-17 Women's World Cup Bronze Boot: 2022
- IFFHS Women's World's Best Youth (U20) Player: 2022
- Reina de América (South American Footballer of the Year): 2022
- Women's Revelations Cup best player: 2023
- FIFA Women's World Cup Goal of the Tournament: 2023
- Golden Girl: 2023
- IFFHS Women's World Team: 2023
- IFFHS CONMEBOL Women's Team of the Year: 2023
- FIFPRO Women's World 11: 2024
- Liga F Player of the Month: January 2025
- Liga F Team of the Season: 2024–25
- Trofeo EFE: 2025
