= 2021 Colombian Women's Football League =

Liga Femenina BetPlay Dimayor
- Season: 2021
- Dates: 10 July – 12 September 2021
- Champions: Deportivo Cali (1st title)
- Copa Libertadores Femenina: Deportivo Cali; Santa Fe
- Matches: 56
- Goals: 150 (2.68 per match)
- Top goalscorer: Catalina Usme (12 goals)
- Biggest home win: La Equidad 5–1 Llaneros (22 July); América de Cali 4–0 Real Santander (2 August)
- Biggest away win: Atl. Bucaramanga 0–8 América de Cali (24 August)
- Highest scoring: Atl. Bucaramanga 0–8 América de Cali (24 August)

The 2021 Colombian Women's Football League (officially known as the Liga Femenina BetPlay Dimayor 2021 for sponsorship purposes) was the fifth season of Colombia's top-flight women's football league. The season started on 10 July and ended on 12 September 2021.

Deportivo Cali won their first title in the competition, defeating the defending champions Santa Fe in the double-legged final series by a 6–3 aggregate score.

== Format ==
On 29 April 2021, the División Mayor del Fútbol Profesional Colombiano (DIMAYOR) confirmed the format for the 2021 Liga Femenina season, following a meeting of its Board of Competition. For this season the league would have 12 teams competing, which were split into three groups of four where they would play each other in a double round-robin tournament. The top two teams in each group as well as the two best third-placed teams would advance to the quarter-finals, with the winners advancing to the semi-finals. The winners of each semi-final would qualify for the finals to decide the champions. All rounds in the knockout stage would be played on a home-and-away, double-legged basis. The champions and runners-up qualified for the 2021 Copa Libertadores Femenina.

Due to the withdrawal of Cortuluá, DIMAYOR announced changes to the competition format on 17 June 2021. The remaining 11 clubs were split into two groups, one of which would be made up of six teams and the other one containing five teams. Teams would play each one of the teams in their group twice (once at home and once away), with teams in group A having two bye matchdays for a total of 10 matches. The top two teams in each group advanced to the semi-finals, with their winners playing the final.

== Teams ==
12 DIMAYOR affiliate clubs were originally expected to take part in the competition with their women's teams. Out of the 13 clubs that competed in the previous season, neither Deportivo Pasto nor Junior fielded a team in this edition, whilst Cortuluá were to return to the competition. However, on 8 June 2021 Cortuluá withdrew from the competition owing to financial reasons, with which the number of participant clubs went down to 11.

=== Stadia and locations ===
Locations of the 2021 Liga Femenina teams

| Group | Team | City | Stadium |
|---|---|---|---|
| A | Fortaleza | Chía | Villa Olímpica |
| A | La Equidad | Bogotá | Metropolitano de Techo |
| A | Llaneros | Villavicencio | Bello Horizonte |
| A | Millonarios | Bogotá | Nemesio Camacho El Campín |
| A | Santa Fe | Bogotá | Nemesio Camacho El Campín |
| B | América de Cali | Cali | Pascual Guerrero |
| B | Atlético Bucaramanga | Bucaramanga | Alfonso López |
| B | Atlético Nacional | Medellín | Atanasio Girardot |
| B | Deportivo Cali | Palmira | Deportivo Cali |
| B | Independiente Medellín | Medellín | Atanasio Girardot |
| B | Real Santander | Piedecuesta | Villa Concha |

== First stage ==
The first stage started on 10 July and consisted of one group of five teams and one group of six. It ended on 29 August with the top two teams from each group advancing to the knockout stage.

=== Group A ===
| Pos | Team | Pld | W | D | L | GF | GA | GD | Pts | Qualification | SFE | EQU | MIL | FOR | LLA |
|---|---|---|---|---|---|---|---|---|---|---|---|---|---|---|---|
| 1 | Santa Fe | 8 | 6 | 1 | 1 | 18 | 8 | +10 | 19 | Advance to knockout stage | — | 3–2 | 3–0 | 2–0 | 3–1 |
| 2 | La Equidad | 8 | 3 | 3 | 2 | 11 | 6 | +5 | 12 | Advance to knockout stage | 1–0 | — | 1–1 | 2–0 | 5–1 |
| 3 | Millonarios | 8 | 2 | 5 | 1 | 9 | 8 | +1 | 11 | | 0–0 | 0–0 | — | 2–2 | 3–0 |
| 4 | Fortaleza | 8 | 2 | 3 | 3 | 8 | 11 | −3 | 9 | | 2–3 | 1–0 | 1–1 | — | 2–1 |
| 5 | Llaneros | 8 | 0 | 2 | 6 | 6 | 19 | −13 | 2 | | 2–4 | 0–0 | 1–2 | 0–0 | — |

Source: Dimayor
Rules for classification: 1) Points, 2) Goal difference, 3) Goals for, 4) Away goals for, 5) Away goals against, 6) Yellow cards, 7) Red cards, 8) Drawing of lots.

=== Group B ===
| Pos | Team | Pld | W | D | L | GF | GA | GD | Pts | Qualification | CAL | NAC | AME | DIM | RSA | BUC |
|---|---|---|---|---|---|---|---|---|---|---|---|---|---|---|---|---|
| 1 | Deportivo Cali | 10 | 6 | 4 | 0 | 16 | 6 | +10 | 22 | Advance to knockout stage | — | 1–1 | 1–0 | 3–0 | 1–0 | 3–1 |
| 2 | Atlético Nacional | 10 | 6 | 3 | 1 | 14 | 7 | +7 | 21 | Advance to knockout stage | 0–0 | — | 2–3 | 2–1 | 2–1 | 2–0 |
| 3 | América de Cali | 10 | 6 | 2 | 2 | 25 | 10 | +15 | 20 | | 2–2 | 1–1 | — | 2–4 | 4–0 | 2–0 |
| 4 | Independiente Medellín | 10 | 5 | 1 | 4 | 16 | 12 | +4 | 16 | | 1–1 | 0–2 | 0–1 | — | 3–1 | 3–0 |
| 5 | Real Santander | 10 | 2 | 0 | 8 | 8 | 19 | −11 | 6 | | 1–2 | 0–1 | 0–2 | 0–2 | — | 3–1 |
| 6 | Atlético Bucaramanga | 10 | 0 | 0 | 10 | 3 | 28 | −25 | 0 | | 0–2 | 0–1 | 0–8 | 0–2 | 1–2 | — |

Source: Dimayor
Rules for classification: 1) Points, 2) Goal difference, 3) Goals for, 4) Away goals for, 5) Away goals against, 6) Yellow cards, 7) Red cards, 8) Drawing of lots.

== Knockout stage ==
=== Bracket ===
Semi-finals
Atlético Nacional | 0 | 1 | 1
Santa Fe | 1 | 2 | 3
La Equidad | 1 | 0 | 1
Deportivo Cali | 2 | 2 | 4

Finals
Santa Fe | 1 | 2 | 3
Deportivo Cali | 4 | 2 | 6

=== Semi-finals ===
| Team 1 | Agg. | Team 2 | 1st leg | 2nd leg |
|---|---|---|---|---|
| Atlético Nacional | 1–3 | Santa Fe | 0–1 | 1–2 |
| La Equidad | 1–4 | Deportivo Cali | 1–2 | 0–2 |

==== First leg ====
| 1 September 2021 | La Equidad | 1–2 | Deportivo Cali | Bogotá |
| 13:00 | Sánchez 16' | Report | Morales 78'; Orozco 84' | Stadium: Metropolitano de Techo; Referee: María Victoria Daza |

| 1 September 2021 | Atlético Nacional | 0–1 | Santa Fe | Medellín |
| 15:05 | | Report | Peralta 73' | Stadium: Atanasio Girardot; Referee: Viviana Muñoz |

==== Second leg ====
| 4 September 2021 | Deportivo Cali | 2–0 (4–1 agg.) | La Equidad | Palmira |
| 10:00 | Medina 7'; Morales 24' (pen.) | Report | | Stadium: Deportivo Cali; Referee: Vanessa Reales |

| 4 September 2021 | Santa Fe | 2–1 (3–1 agg.) | Atlético Nacional | Bogotá |
| 20:10 | Peña 22'; Gauto 45+3' (pen.) | Report | Cuesta 37' | Stadium: El Campín; Referee: Yessica Villadiego |

=== Finals ===
7 September 2021
20:00

| Santa Fe | 1–4 | Deportivo Cali |
|---|---|---|
| Muñoz 30' | Report | Pavi 7'; L. Caicedo 18'; F. Caicedo 50'; Morales 57' (pen.) |

Estadio El Campín, Bogotá
Referee: Mariana Quintero

12 September 2021
20:10

| Deportivo Cali | 2–2 | Santa Fe |
|---|---|---|
| L. Caicedo 13', 31' | Report | Salazar 50'; Gauto 65' |

Estadio Deportivo Cali – Myriam Guerrero, Palmira
Attendance: 11,250
Referee: María Victoria Daza

Deportivo Cali won 6–3 on aggregate.

== Top scorers ==
| Rank | Name | Club | Goals |
|---|---|---|---|
| 1 | (Colombia) Catalina Usme | América de Cali | 12 |
| 2 | (Paraguay) Fany Gauto | Santa Fe | 7 |
| 3 | (Colombia) Heidy Mosquera | Real Santander | 6 |
| 3 | (Venezuela) Joemar Guarecuco | América de Cali | 6 |
| 3 | (Colombia) Manuela Pavi | Deportivo Cali | 6 |
| 6 | (Colombia) Linda Caicedo | Deportivo Cali | 5 |
| 7 | (Colombia) Ivonne Chacón | Santa Fe | 4 |
| 7 | (Colombia) María Fernanda Agudelo | Atlético Nacional | 4 |
| 7 | (Colombia) Yisela Cuesta | Atlético Nacional | 4 |
| 7 | (Colombia) María Morales | Deportivo Cali | 4 |

Source: Fémina Fútbol

== See also ==
- Colombian Women's Football League
