= Joemar Guarecuco =

Venezuelan football player (born 1994)

Personal information
- Full name: Joemar Del Carmen Guarecuco Barroso
- Date of birth: 20 June 1994 (age 32)
- Place of birth: Socopó, Barinas, Venezuela
- Height: 1.71 m (5 ft 7 in)
- Position: Striker

Team information
- Current team: América de Cali

Senior career*
Years	Team	Apps	(Gls)
2010	Potros de Barinas		
2011–2012	Yaracuyanos F.C.		
2013–2016	Estudiantes de Guárico		
2017	Zamora FC		
2018–2019	Cortuluá Femenino		
2020–2022	América de Cali	10+	(6+)
→ 2021	Santa Fe (loan)	0	(0)
2022–	Ferroviária		

International career^{‡}
2009–2010	Venezuela U-17	5+	(3+)
2018–2023	Venezuela	4	(0)
- * Club domestic league appearances and goals as of 08:24, 30 May 2022 (UTC) ‡ National team caps and goals as of 17:35, 17 December 2021 (UTC)

Joemar Del Carmen Guarecuco Barroso (born 20 June 1994) is a Venezuelan women's footballer who has played for the national team. She currently plays for Campeonato Brasileiro de Futebol Feminino Série A1 side Ferroviária.

== Club career ==
In 2010, Guarecuco played for Potros de Barinas. From 2011 until 2012, she played for Yaracuyanos F.C. Femino, and from 2013–2016, she played for Estudiantes de Guárico. Whilst at Estudiantes de Guárico, she won the Venezuelan women's football championship in 2013, 2015, and 2016, and was part of the team that came second in the 2016 Copa Libertadores Femenina. In 2017, she played for Zamora FC, She played for Estudiantes de Guárico in the 2016 Copa Libertadores Femenina, and scored a goal in their semi-final match against Colón. In 2018, she signed for Colombian side Cortuluá Femenino.

In 2020, Guarecuco signed for Colombian side América de Cali. She was the joint third top scorer in the 2020 Colombian Women's Football League, with four goals. She played for América de Cali in the 2020 Copa Libertadores Femenina, where they lost in the final to Brazilian team Ferroviária. She scored six goals in the 2021 Colombian Women's Football League, and was the joint second top-scorer. In September 2021, she was loaned to Colombian club Santa Fe for the 2021 Copa Libertadores Femenina; she was the club's third Venezuelan player. In January 2022, she signed for Campeonato Brasileiro de Futebol Feminino Série A1 side Ferroviária.

== International career ==
In 2009, Guarecuco scored the crucial goal for Venezuela U-17 against Paraguay U-17, causing them to qualifying for the 2010 FIFA U-17 Women's World Cup in Trinidad and Tobago. She played in three matches in the tournament. Later, Guarecuco scored a hat-trick in Venezuela under-17's 4–1 victory over Trinidad and Tobago under-17s. Guarecuco was in the senior squad for the 2018 Copa América Femenina in Chile. She made one substitute appearance. Guarecuco was not selected for the Venezuelan squad for 2022 Copa América Femenina due to a cruciate ligament injury.
