= Manuela Paví =

Colombian footballer (born 2000)

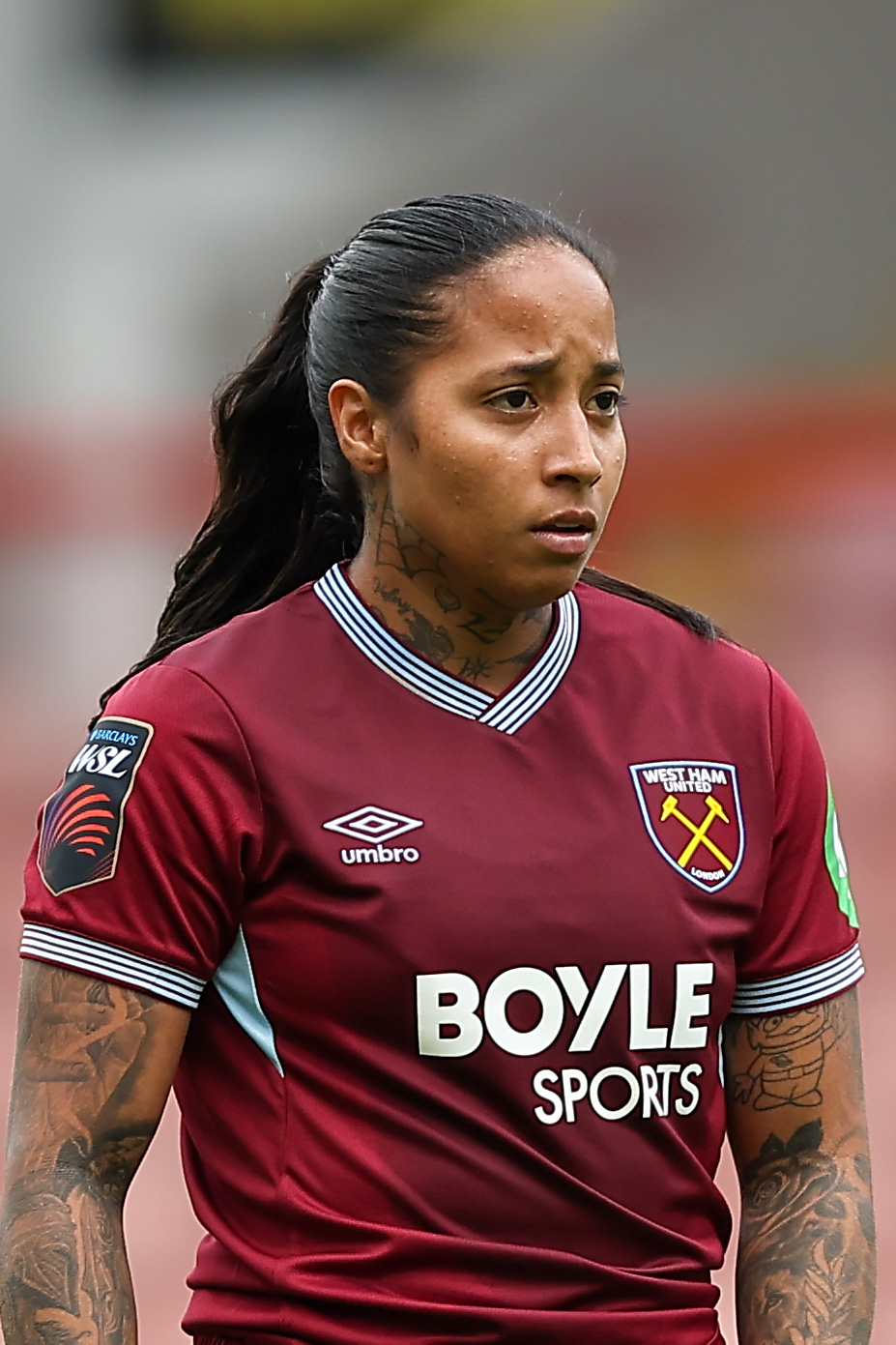
- Paví in 2025

Personal information
- Full name: Manuela Paví Sepúlveda
- Date of birth: 23 December 2000 (age 25)
- Place of birth: Pradera, Colombia
- Height: 1.60 m (5 ft 3 in)
- Position: Forward

Team information
- Current team: Toluca
- Number: 29

Senior career*
Years	Team	Apps	(Gls)
2018–2019	Orsomarso	16	(3)
2020–2022	Deportivo Cali	30+	(16+)
2023	Atlético Mineiro	10	(2)
2024	Deportivo Cali	15	(6)
2024–2026	West Ham United	20	(2)
2026–	Toluca	10	(1)

International career^{‡}
2019–	Colombia	30	(5)
2020	Colombia U20	3	(1)
Medal record
Women's football
Representing Colombia
Copa América Femenina
Silver medal – second place	2025 Ecuador
- * Club domestic league appearances and goals as of 31 January 2026 ‡ National team caps and goals as of 26 June 2025

Manuela Paví Sepúlveda (Spanish: [maˈnwela paˈβi seˈpulβeða]; born 23 December 2000) is a Colombian professional footballer who plays as a forward for Liga MX Femenil club Deportivo Toluca F.C. (women) and the Colombia women's national team.

== Club career ==
Paví was born in the village of Pradera in Valle del Cauca Department. She started out playing soccer on boys' teams. She scored a goal in her professional debut for Orsomarso in 2018.

She signed with Deportivo Cali during the COVID-19 pandemic. She recorded two goals and one assist in six games as Cali made it to the quarterfinals in 2020. She was one of Cali's top players as they won the league in 2021. In the first leg of the final, she scored a goal, assisted two others, and drew a penalty in the 4–1 win against Santa Fe, before Cali won 6–3 on aggregate. She scored five goals in the knockout tournament, second-most behind teammate Catalina Usme, and led the tournament with six assists.

She signed with Brazilian club Atlético Mineiro in January 2023.

In August 2024, Paví signed for West Ham United Women on a three-year contract.

On 20 January 2026, having made a total of 34 appearances for West Ham and finding herself on the fringes of the team's selection during the 2025-26 season, it was announced that Pavi had joined Deportivo Toluca F.C. Femenil, signing a three-year contract.

== International career ==
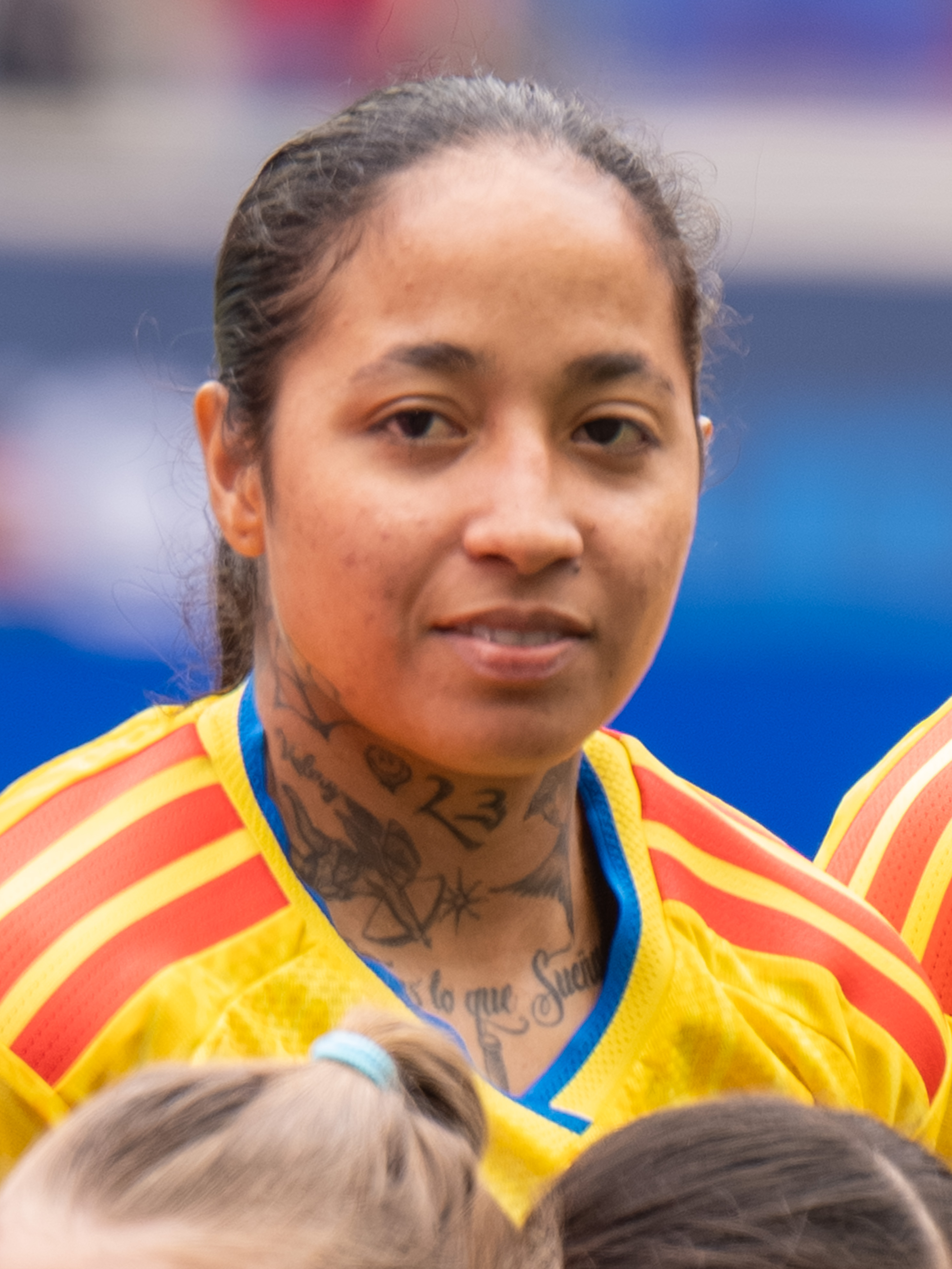
Paví with Colombia in 2026

Paví was first called up to the Colombia senior national team at the age of 18. She made her international debut in friendly game against Argentina on 9 November 2019, substituting in the 88th minute of the 1–0 loss. She played for the national under-20 team at the 2020 South American Under-20 Women's Football Championship, helping the team qualify for the final stage which was cancelled because of the COVID-19 pandemic.

Paví tore her ACL at a national team camp in October 2021. She did not play at the 2023 FIFA Women's World Cup due to injury. Paví was called up to the Colombia squad for the 2024 CONCACAF W Gold Cup. In her first tournament for Colombia, she scored a brace against Panama in the opening match of the 2024 CONCACAF W Gold Cup. She was selected to the roster for the 2024 Summer Olympics in France.

== International goals ==
No.	Date	Venue	Opponent	Score	Result	Competition
1.	21 February 2024	Snapdragon Stadium, San Diego, United States	Panama	1–0	6–0	2024 CONCACAF W Gold Cup
2.	21 February 2024	Snapdragon Stadium, San Diego, United States	Panama	2–0	6–0	2024 CONCACAF W Gold Cup
3.	2 June 2024	Estadio Metropolitano de Lara, Barquisimeto, Venezuela	Venezuela	2–0	3–0	Friendly
4.	25 July 2024	Stade de Lyon, Décines-Charpieu, France	France	2–3	2–3	2024 Summer Olympics
