= 2020 Colombian Women's Football League =

Liga Femenina BetPlay Dimayor
- Season: 2020
- Dates: 16 October – 13 December 2020
- Champions: Santa Fe (2nd title)
- Copa Libertadores Femenina: Santa Fe; América de Cali
- Matches: 58
- Goals: 157 (2.71 per match)
- Top goalscorer: Ysaura Viso (13 goals)
- Biggest home win: Millonarios 5–0 Llaneros (16 October)
- Biggest away win: Fortaleza 0–5 Santa Fe (29 October); Llaneros 0–5 Santa Fe (15 November); Atl. Bucaramanga 0–5 Atlético Nacional (20 November)
- Highest scoring: Santa Fe 5–1 Llaneros (1 November); Ind. Medellín 4–2 Atl. Bucaramanga (16 November)

The 2020 Colombian Women's Football League (officially known as the Liga Femenina BetPlay Dimayor 2020 for sponsorship purposes) was the fourth season of Colombia's top-flight women's football league. The season started on 16 October and ended on 13 December 2020.

Santa Fe won their second title in the competition after beating defending champions América de Cali in the finals by an aggregate score of 4–1 over two legs.

== Format ==
For this season the league featured 13 teams, down from the 18 which had originally expressed their intention to take part prior to the COVID-19 pandemic. The 13 teams were split into two groups of four teams and one group of five teams, where they played each other in a double round-robin tournament. The top two teams in each group as well as the two best third-placed teams advanced to the quarter-finals, with the winners advancing to the semi-finals. The winners of each semi-final qualified for the finals to decide the champions. All rounds in the knockout stage were played on a home-and-away, double-legged basis. The champions and runners-up qualified for the 2020 Copa Libertadores Femenina.

== Teams ==
13 teams took part in the competition. The teams are affiliated with DIMAYOR affiliate clubs. Atlético, Atlético Huila, Cortuluá, Cúcuta Deportivo, Deportes Tolima, Deportivo Pereira, Once Caldas, and Orsomarso did not field a team in this edition, whilst Llaneros competed for the first time.

=== Stadia and locations ===
Locations of the 2020 Liga Femenina teams

| Group | Team | City | Stadium |
|---|---|---|---|
| A | Fortaleza | Chía | Villa Olímpica |
| A | La Equidad | Bogotá | Metropolitano de Techo |
| A | Llaneros | Villavicencio | Bello Horizonte |
| A | Millonarios | Bogotá | Nemesio Camacho El Campín |
| A | Santa Fe | Bogotá | Nemesio Camacho El Campín |
| B | América de Cali | Cali | Pascual Guerrero |
| B | Deportivo Cali | Palmira | Deportivo Cali |
| B | Deportivo Pasto | Pasto | Departamental Libertad |
| B | Junior | Barranquilla | Romelio Martínez |
| C | Atlético Bucaramanga | Bucaramanga | Alfonso López |
| C | Atlético Nacional | Guarne | Bernardo Álvarez |
| C | Independiente Medellín | Itagüí | Metropolitano Ciudad de Itagüí |
| C | Real San Andrés | Bucaramanga | Alfonso López |

== First stage ==
The First stage started on 16 October and consisted of two groups of four teams and one group of five. It ended on 20 November with the top two teams from each group as well as the two best third-placed teams advancing to the knockout stage.

=== Group A ===
| Pos | Team | Pld | W | D | L | GF | GA | GD | Pts | Qualification | SFE | MIL | FOR | EQU | LLA |
|---|---|---|---|---|---|---|---|---|---|---|---|---|---|---|---|
| 1 | Santa Fe | 8 | 8 | 0 | 0 | 28 | 4 | +24 | 24 | Advanced to knockout stage | — | 3–2 | 2–0 | 3–1 | 5–1 |
| 2 | Millonarios | 8 | 4 | 1 | 3 | 15 | 10 | +5 | 13 | Advanced to knockout stage | 0–3 | — | 1–0 | 2–0 | 5–0 |
| 3 | Fortaleza | 8 | 2 | 1 | 5 | 7 | 14 | −7 | 7 | | 0–5 | 2–1 | — | 2–0 | 1–2 |
| 4 | La Equidad | 8 | 2 | 1 | 5 | 5 | 12 | −7 | 7 | | 0–2 | 1–1 | 1–0 | — | 2–1 |
| 5 | Llaneros | 8 | 2 | 1 | 5 | 8 | 23 | −15 | 7 | | 0–5 | 1–3 | 2–2 | 1–0 | — |

Source: Dimayor
Rules for classification: 1) Points, 2) Goal difference, 3) Goals for, 4) Away goals for, 5) Away goals against, 6) Yellow cards, 7) Red cards, 8) Drawing of lots.

=== Group B ===
| Pos | Team | Pld | W | D | L | GF | GA | GD | Pts | Qualification | AME | CAL | JUN | PAS |
|---|---|---|---|---|---|---|---|---|---|---|---|---|---|---|
| 1 | América de Cali | 6 | 5 | 0 | 1 | 9 | 4 | +5 | 15 | Advanced to knockout stage | — | 2–0 | 2–0 | 3–1 |
| 2 | Deportivo Cali | 6 | 2 | 2 | 2 | 6 | 5 | +1 | 8 | Advanced to knockout stage | 3–0 | — | 0–1 | 0–0 |
| 3 | Junior | 6 | 2 | 2 | 2 | 6 | 6 | 0 | 8 | Advanced to knockout stage | 0–1 | 1–1 | — | 3–1 |
| 4 | Deportivo Pasto | 6 | 0 | 2 | 4 | 4 | 10 | −6 | 2 | | 0–1 | 1–2 | 1–1 | — |

Source: Dimayor
Rules for classification: 1) Points, 2) Goal difference, 3) Goals for, 4) Away goals for, 5) Away goals against, 6) Yellow cards, 7) Red cards, 8) Drawing of lots.

=== Group C ===
| Pos | Team | Pld | W | D | L | GF | GA | GD | Pts | Qualification | DIM | RSA | NAC | BUC |
|---|---|---|---|---|---|---|---|---|---|---|---|---|---|---|
| 1 | Independiente Medellín | 6 | 5 | 1 | 0 | 13 | 3 | +10 | 16 | Advanced to knockout stage | — | 3–0 | 1–0 | 4–2 |
| 2 | Real San Andrés | 6 | 2 | 2 | 2 | 5 | 7 | −2 | 8 | Advanced to knockout stage | 0–0 | — | 1–0 | 1–2 |
| 3 | Atlético Nacional | 6 | 2 | 1 | 3 | 10 | 6 | +4 | 7 | Advanced to knockout stage | 1–3 | 1–1 | — | 3–0 |
| 4 | Atlético Bucaramanga | 6 | 1 | 0 | 5 | 5 | 17 | −12 | 3 | | 0–2 | 1–2 | 0–5 | — |

Source: Dimayor
Rules for classification: 1) Points, 2) Goal difference, 3) Goals for, 4) Away goals for, 5) Away goals against, 6) Yellow cards, 7) Red cards, 8) Drawing of lots.

=== Ranking of third-placed teams ===
The two best teams among those ranked third qualified for the knockout stage.

| Pos | Grp | Team | Pld | W | D | L | GF | GA | GD | Pts | PPG | Result |
|---|---|---|---|---|---|---|---|---|---|---|---|---|
| 1 | B | Junior | 6 | 2 | 2 | 2 | 6 | 6 | 0 | 8 | 1.33 | Knockout stage |
| 2 | C | Atlético Nacional | 6 | 2 | 1 | 3 | 10 | 6 | +4 | 7 | 1.17 | Knockout stage |
| 3 | A | Fortaleza | 8 | 2 | 1 | 5 | 7 | 14 | −7 | 7 | 0.88 | |

Source: Dimayor
Rules for classification: 1) Points per game, 2) Goal difference, 3) Goals for, 4) Away goals for, 5) Away goals against, 6) Yellow cards, 7) Red cards, 8) Drawing of lots.

== Knockout stage ==
=== Bracket ===
Quarter-finals
Deportivo Cali | 2 | 1 | 3
Millonarios | 1 | 3 | 4
Atlético Nacional | 0 | 1 | 1
América de Cali | 1 | 1 | 2
Real San Andrés | 1 | 1 | 2
Independiente Medellín | 1 | 3 | 4
Junior | 1 | 3 | 4
Santa Fe | 3 | 2 | 5

Semi-finals
Millonarios | 1 | 0 | 1
América de Cali | 1 | 1 | 2
Independiente Medellín | 0 | 1 | 1
Santa Fe | 2 | 1 | 3

Finals
América de Cali | 1 | 0 | 1
Santa Fe | 2 | 2 | 4

=== Quarter-finals ===
| Team 1 | Agg. | Team 2 | 1st leg | 2nd leg |
|---|---|---|---|---|
| Junior | 4–5 | Santa Fe | 1–3 | 3–2 |
| Atlético Nacional | 1–2 | América de Cali | 0–1 | 1–1 |
| Real San Andrés | 2–4 | Independiente Medellín | 1–1 | 1–3 |
| Deportivo Cali | 3–4 | Millonarios | 2–1 | 1–3 |

=== Semi-finals ===
| Team 1 | Agg. | Team 2 | 1st leg | 2nd leg |
|---|---|---|---|---|
| Independiente Medellín | 1–3 | Santa Fe | 0–2 | 1–1 |
| Millonarios | 1–2 | América de Cali | 1–1 | 0–1 |

=== Finals ===
10 December 2020
20:00 UTC−5

| América de Cali | 1–2 | Santa Fe |
|---|---|---|
| Usme 23' | Report | Chacón 28'; Viso 43' |

Estadio Pascual Guerrero, Cali
Attendance: 0
Referee: Yessica Villadiego

13 December 2020
17:15 UTC−5

| Santa Fe | 2–0 | América de Cali |
|---|---|---|
| Gauto 11'; Rangel 47' | Report |

Estadio El Campín, Bogotá
Attendance: 0
Referee: María Victoria Daza

Santa Fe won 4–1 on aggregate.

Liga Femenina Betplay Dimayor
2020 champions
Santa Fe
2nd title

== Top goalscorers ==
| Rank | Name | Club | Goals |
|---|---|---|---|
| 1 | (Venezuela) Ysaura Viso | Santa Fe | 13 |
| 2 | (Colombia) Nelly Córdoba | Santa Fe | 5 |
| 2 | (Paraguay) Fany Gauto | Santa Fe | 5 |
| 4 | (Venezuela) Joemar Guarecuco | América de Cali | 4 |
| 4 | (Colombia) Tatiana Ariza | Millonarios | 4 |
| 4 | (Colombia) Catalina Usme | América de Cali | 4 |
| 7 | (Colombia) Diana Celis | Santa Fe | 3 |
| 7 | (Colombia) Diana Ospina | Independiente Medellín | 3 |
| 7 | (Colombia) Estefanía Cartagena | Atlético Nacional | 3 |
| 7 | (Colombia) Geraldine Cardona | Independiente Medellín | 3 |

Source: Fémina Fútbol

== See also ==
- Colombian Women's Football League
