= Domino Saints =

Puerto Rican music duo

- Domino Saints in 2016

Background information
- Origin: San Juan, Puerto Rico
- Genres: Reggaeton; Dancehall; Urban
- Years active: 2011–present
- Label: Saints Republic
- Members: David Leal; Giselle "Gigi" Ojeda
- Website: www.dominosaints.com

Domino Saints is a Puerto Rican urban pop duo based in Miami, Florida. It was formed in 2011 by Gigi Ojeda and David Leal. The group gained a sizable following after the release of the music video for their single "Malas Mañas" in August 2012.

The band followed up with their next single, "Exclusivo", which was released on May 29, 2013. Following their split with Capitol Latin, they released the single, "Ya Quiero" on July 8, 2016 that give them their first Billboard Tropical Number No. 1. On February 10, 2017 they released their song "Las Ganas" followed by "Ponte Sexy" on February 24, 2017. Their latest single "Mi Orgullo" was released on May 19, 2017, in 2018 they were selected to represent Puerto Rico at Chile's Viña Del Mar Festival with this song. Now in 2020, they are released their first full-length album titled "Island Kings," which was released via their own label Saints Republic.

During the 2021 Copa América semi-final match between Argentina and Colombia on July 6, 2021, the duo premiered the music video of their single "Dancefreak" off of their upcoming visual project dubbed 'Future Love Games'.

== History ==
=== 2008, 2012, 2017: First encounter, Pre-debut year, return with Rebel Eleven ===
Gigi and David, both just 15 at the time, met on the beach when they were evacuated from the water following a shark attack; he dreamed of being an engineer, she a dancer with the New York City Ballet. Instead, they gravitated toward their shared love of music, eventually studying together at Berklee College in Boston, where they formed a band influenced by acts as disparate as Bob Marley, Michael Jackson, and The Police. They self-released an eponymous debut album in 2008 before moving back to San Juan.

Slimmed down to a duo, they became enamored of contemporary electronic genres like dembow and reggaeton and changed their style to a high-energy urban sound, with bilingual lyrics in both Spanish and English. Relentless gigging boosted their profile, and audiences loved their music and sexy, hard-partying image. After touring the U.S. and bagging a high-profile support slot with Shakira, they moved to Miami in 2012 and were signed by Capitol, which released their sophomore single Malas Mañas. They subsequently signed with artist-centric indie Rebel Eleven, releasing their breakout single: the chart-topping club anthem "Ya Quiero" arrived in 2017.

=== 2020, 2022: Island Kings, Future Love Games ===
In 2020, Island Kings Deluxe, the group's debut album appeared on Saints Republic. Their single "Rockstar" (featuring Gaby Metálico) was selected as the official song of the 2022 Copa América Femenina. They followed with several Top Ten hits including "Buya" and the chart topping "Dancefreak", which hit the top spot in five South American countries. It was followed by the singles comp Future Love Games. 2023's Grooves Frescos compiled four high-charting singles with the unreleased cuts "Roncito y Playa" and "Feel Good".

=== 2026: Reality show debut and Eternos ===
In December 2025, it was announced that the duo would be contestants of the first season of the reality show-romance series ¿Apostarías por mí?. On March 1st, the duo was eliminated in episode 43.

Days later, on March 15th, coinciding with the final episode of the same season, the duo released their album Eternos, that, unlike the three previous albums, this had only 8 songs.

== Members ==
Current members

- Giselle "Gigi" Ojeda – lead vocals (2011–present)
- David Leal – lead vocals (2011–present)

== Discography ==
=== LPs ===
List of mixtapes
Title	Album details
Island Kings Deluxe	Released: May 29, 2020; Label: Saints Republic; Formats: Digital download
Future Love Games	Released: October 14, 2020; Label: Toro Artists Music; Formats: Digital download
Eternos	Released: March 15, 2026; Label: Vydia; Formats: Digital download

=== EPs ===
List of mixtapes
Title	Album details
Rebels	Released: May 19, 2017; Label: Rebel Eleven; Formats: Digital download

=== Singles ===
- 2021 – My Way (Just Dance 2022 Edit)
- 2020 – No Es Pecado
- 2020 – Boca A Boca
- 2020 – Sol Y Playa
- 2020 – Animal
- 2020 – Body
- 2020 – Wine
- 2019 – Dutty Love
- 2019 – A La Buena
- 2017 – Mi Orgullo
- 2017 – Ponte Sexy
- 2017 – Las Ganas
- 2016 – Ya Quiero
- 2014 – Tesoro
- 2013 – Exclusivo
- 2012 – Malas Mañas
- 2011 – Ahora es Ahora

== Filmography ==
=== Television ===
List of television appearances and roles
Title	Year	Role	Notes	Ref.
¿Apostarías por mí?	2026	Themselves	Season 1 contestants	
