= Ivonne Chacón =

Colombian footballer (born 1997)

Personal information
- Date of birth: 12 October 1997 (age 29)
- Place of birth: Bogotá, Colombia
- Height: 1.71 m (5 ft 7 in)
- Position: Forward

Team information
- Current team: Fiorentina

Senior career*
Years	Team	Apps	(Gls)
2021	Santa Fe	12	(4)
2022	Millonarios	18	(5)
2022–2024	Valencia	35	(4)
2024–2025	Levante UD	30	(11)
2025–2026	Chicago Stars	18	(1)
2026–	Fiorentina	0	(0)

International career^{‡}
2022–	Colombia	6	(0)
- * Club domestic league appearances and goals as of 13 August 2026 ‡ National team caps and goals as of 11 April 2023

Ivonne Chacón (born 12 October 1997) is a Colombian professional footballer who plays as a forward for Serie A club Fiorentina and the Colombia national team.

== Club career ==
Chacón began her senior career at Santa Fe in 2021. The following season, she signed with Millonarios. In the 2022–23 season, she signed for Liga F club Valencia.

After two years in Valencia, Chacón joined Levante UD.

On 28 August 2025, Chacón signed with American National Women's Soccer League club Chicago Stars FC through 2027. She made her NWSL debut one month later, coming on as a second-half substitute for Bea Franklin in a defeat to the Kansas City Current. Across one year at Chicago, she played primarily as a substitute, making 3 starts in her 18 appearances and scoring once.

In August 2026, Chacón was transferred to Italian Serie A club Fiorentina.

== International career ==
On 4 July 2023, Chacón was added to Colombia's 2023 FIFA Women's World Cup squad.

== International goals ==
No.	Date	Venue	Opponent	Score	Result	Competition
1.	8 October 2022	Estadio Deportivo Cali, Palmira, Colombia	Paraguay	1–0	1–0	Friendly
2.	12 October 2022	Estadio Olímpico Pascual Guerrero, Cali, Colombia	Paraguay	1–0	4–0	Friendly
3.	24 October 2025	Estadio Atanasio Girardot, Medellín, Colombia	Peru	4–1	4–1	2025–26 CONMEBOL Liga de Naciones Femenina

== Honours ==
Independiente Santa Fe

- Liga Femenina Profesional runner-up: 2021
- Copa Libertadores Femenina runners-up: 2021
