= Esperanza Pizarro =

Uruguayan footballer (born 2001)

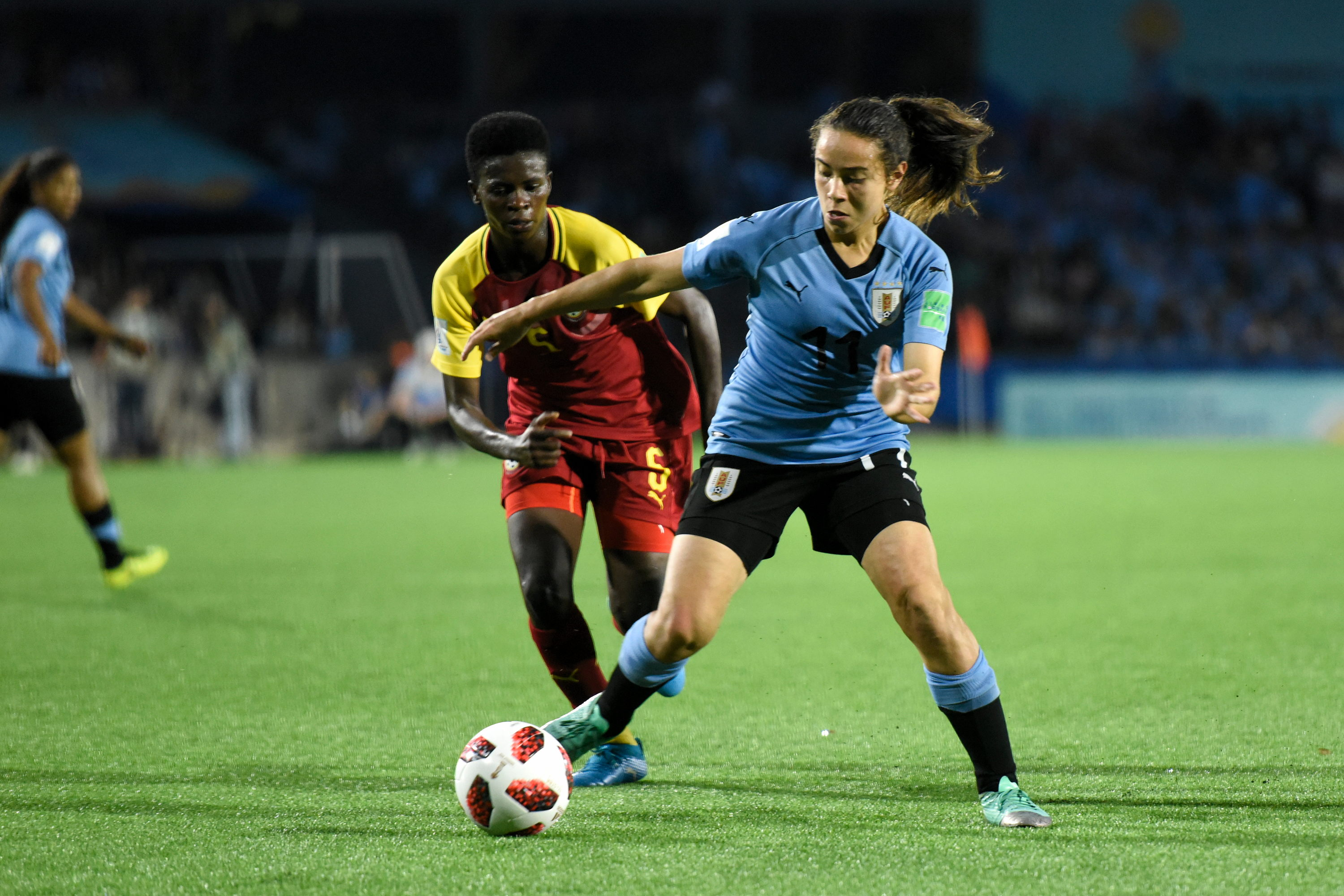
- Pizarro with Uruguay U17 in 2018

Personal information
- Full name: Esperanza Pizarro Pagalday
- Date of birth: 15 April 2001 (age 25)
- Place of birth: Montevideo, Uruguay
- Height: 1.60 m (5 ft 3 in)
- Position: Forward

Team information
- Current team: Eibar
- Number: 9

Youth career
- 2019–2020: Nacional

Senior career*
Years	Team	Apps	(Gls)
2017–2019	Palmirense		
2020–2021	Nacional	21	(36)
2022–2023	Santa Teresa	17	(4)
2023–	Eibar	1	(0)

International career^{‡}
2018	Uruguay U17	3	(1)
2018	Uruguay U20	?	(2)
2019–	Uruguay	1	(0)
- * Club domestic league appearances and goals as of 16 September 2023 ‡ National team caps and goals as of 4 March 2019

Esperanza Pizarro Pagalday (born 15 April 2001) is a Uruguayan professional footballer who plays as a forward for Spanish Liga F club SD Eibar and the Uruguay women's national team.

== Club career ==
At the club level, Pizarro has played for Nacional in Uruguay.

== International career ==
Pizarro represented Uruguay at the 2018 South American U-20 Women's Championship and the 2018 FIFA U-17 Women's World Cup. She made her senior debut on 4 March 2019 in a 0–6 friendly loss against France.

== International goals ==
No.	Date	Venue	Opponent	Score	Result	Competition
1.	12 June 2021	Estadio Centenario, Montevideo, Uruguay	Puerto Rico	1–0	5–1	Friendly
2.	18 July 2022	Estadio Centenario, Armenia, Colombia	Peru	3–0	6–0	2022 Copa América Femenina
3.	18 July 2022	Estadio Centenario, Armenia, Colombia	Peru	6–0	6–0	2022 Copa América Femenina
4.	10 April 2023	Estadio Alfredo Victor Viera, Montevideo, Uruguay	Peru	2–0	3–0	Friendly
5.	27 February 2024	Estadio Charrúa, Montevideo, Uruguay	Ecuador	1–0	2–0	Friendly
6.	27 February 2024	Estadio Charrúa, Montevideo, Uruguay	Ecuador	2–0	2–0	Friendly
7.	3 December 2024	Complejo Juan Pinto Durán, Santiago, Chile	Chile	1–0	1–0	Friendly
8.	1 August 2025	Estadio Rodrigo Paz Delgado, Quito, Ecuador	Argentina	1–1	2–2 (4–5 p)	2025 Copa América Femenina
9.	14 April 2026	Estadio Municipal de El Alto, El Alto, Bolivia	Bolivia	1–0	2–1	2025–26 CONMEBOL Women's Nations League
10.	14 April 2026	Estadio Municipal de El Alto, El Alto, Bolivia	Bolivia	2–1	2–1	2025–26 CONMEBOL Women's Nations League
