= María Carvajal =

Chilean football referee (born 1983)

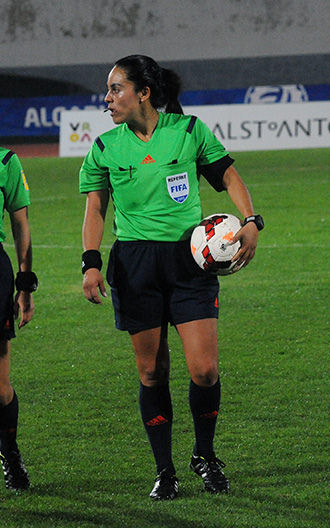
- Full name: María Belén Carvajal Peña
- Born: 13 September 1983 (age 43); Chile

International
Years	League	Role
2007-	FIFA listed	Referee

María Belén Carvajal Peña (born 13 September 1983) is a Chilean international football referee. She became an international listed referees since 2007. She was an official at the 2019 FIFA Women's World Cup in France. On 9 January 2023, FIFA appointed her to the officiating pool for the 2023 FIFA Women's World Cup in Australia and New Zealand.
