= Liana Salazar =

Colombian footballer (born 1992)

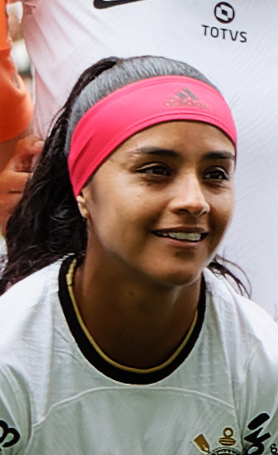
- Salazar with Corinthians in 2023

Personal information
- Full name: Liana Milena Salazar Vergara
- Date of birth: 16 September 1992 (age 34)
- Place of birth: Bogotá, Colombia
- Height: 1.59 m (5 ft 3 in)
- Position: Midfielder

Team information
- Current team: NEOM
- Number: 11

College career
Years	Team	Apps	(Gls)
2011–2015	Kansas Jayhawks	83	(28)

Senior career*
Years	Team	Apps	(Gls)
2010	Liga Bogotá		
2016	Sudet		
2017–2018	Santa Fe		
2018	Atlético Huila		
2019–2020	Beijing BSU		
2021	Santa Fe	12	(3)
2022–2023	Corinthians	13	(0)
2023–2024	Santa Fe	3	(3)
2024–	NEOM	3	(4)

International career
2008	Colombia U17		
2011–	Colombia	13 (?)	(0)
Medal record
Women's football
Representing Colombia
Copa América Femenina
Runner-up	2022 Colombia
- * Club domestic league appearances and goals as of 31 March 2023

Liana Milena Salazar Vergara (born 16 September 1992) is a Colombian professional footballer who plays as a midfielder for Saudi Women's First Division League club NEOM and the Colombia women's national team.

== Career ==
At college level, she played for the University of Kansas in the United States.

On 14 January 2022, Salazar was announced at Corinthians.

== International career ==
She represented her country at the 2012 Summer Olympics.

On 14 July 2016, she was called up to the Colombia squad for the 2016 Summer Olympics.

Salazar was called up to the Colombia squad for the 2018 Copa América Femenina.

On 3 July 2022, she was called up to the Colombia squad for the 2022 Copa América Femenina, which Colombia finished as runners-up.

Salazar was called up to the Colombia squad for the 2024 CONCACAF W Gold Cup.

On 5 July 2024, she was called up to the Colombia squad for the 2024 Summer Olympics.

== See also ==
- Colombia at the 2012 Summer Olympics
