= Laura Fortunato (referee) =

Argentine football referee (born 1985)

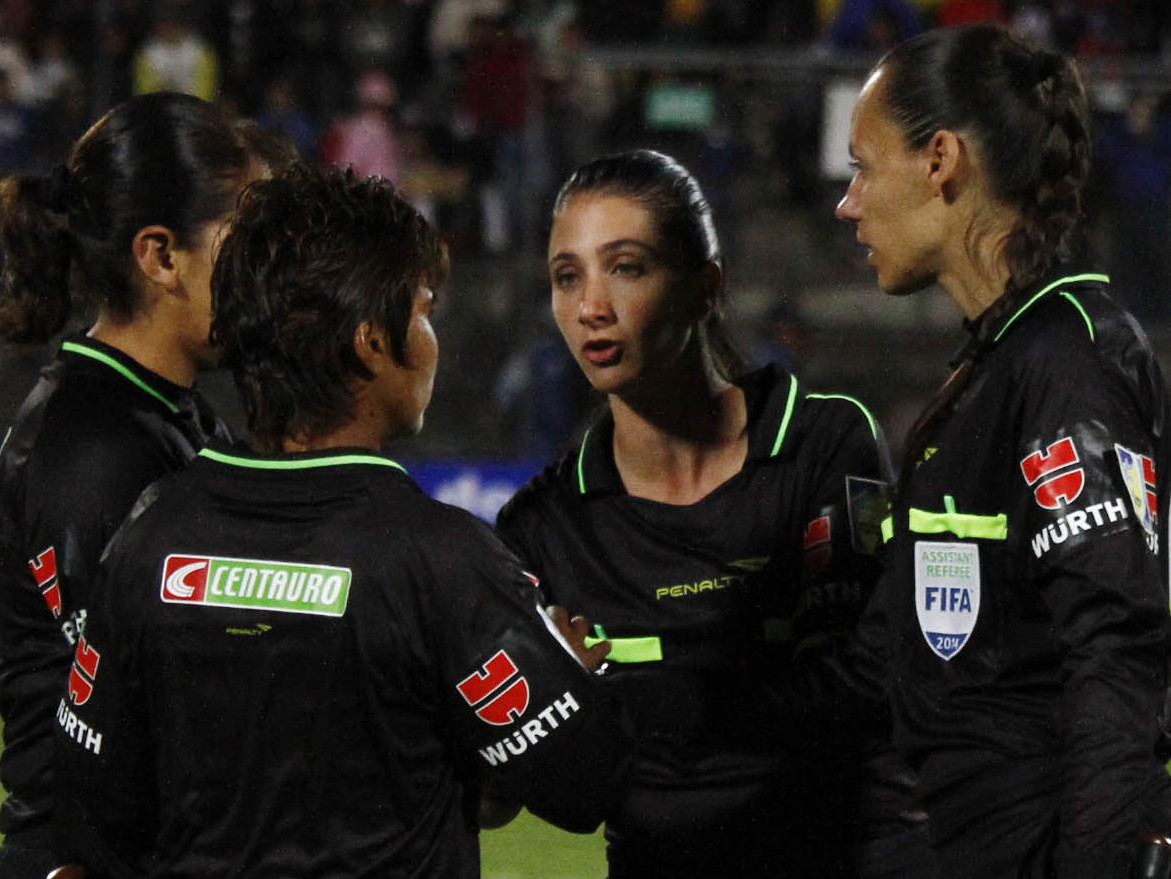
- Full name: María Laura Fortunato
- Born: 31 May 1985 (age 41); Buenos Aires, Argentina

International
Years	League	Role
2010-	FIFA listed	Referee

María Laura Fortunato (born 31 May 1985) is an Argentine professional football referee. She was an official at the 2019 FIFA Women's World Cup in France. On 9 January 2023, FIFA appointed her to the officiating pool for the 2023 FIFA Women's World Cup in Australia and New Zealand.
