= Fany Gauto =

Paraguayan footballer (born 1992)

Personal information
- Full name: Fany Mabel Gauto Caballero
- Date of birth: 19 August 1992 (age 34)
- Place of birth: Villa del Rosario, Paraguay
- Height: 1.64 m (5 ft 5 in)
- Positions: Midfielder; forward

Team information
- Current team: Mixto

Senior career*
| Years | Team | Apps | (Gls) |
| 2010–2012 | Olimpia | | |
| 2012 | UAA | | |
| 2013–2015 | Sportivo Luqueño | | |
| 2015–2016 | Maccabi Holon | 19 | (16) |
| 2017 | Cúcuta Deportivo | | |
| 2017 | Sportivo Limpeño | | |
| 2018 | Cúcuta Deportivo | | |
| 2018–2019 | Atlético Huila | | |
| 2020–2021 | Santa Fe | 12+ | (7+) |
| 2022 | Ferroviária | 7 | (1) |
| 2023–2024 | Internacional | | |
| 2024–2025 | Atlético Mineiro | | |
| 2026– | Mixto | | |

International career^{‡}
| 2012 | Paraguay U20 | 1+ | (1) |
| 2014– | Paraguay | 3 | (0) |
- * Club domestic league appearances and goals as of 16 May 2022 ‡ National team caps and goals as of 20 September 2014

Fany Mabel Gauto Caballero (born 19 August 1992) is a Paraguayan professional footballer who plays as a midfielder for Brazilian Série A1 club Mixto and the Paraguay women's national team. She has also played for the Paraguay women's under-20 team.

== International career ==
Gauto represented Paraguay at the 2012 South American U-20 Women's Championship. At senior level, she played the 2014 Copa América Femenina.
