= 2018 Copa Libertadores Femenina =

Copa CONMEBOL Libertadores Feminina Brasil 2018
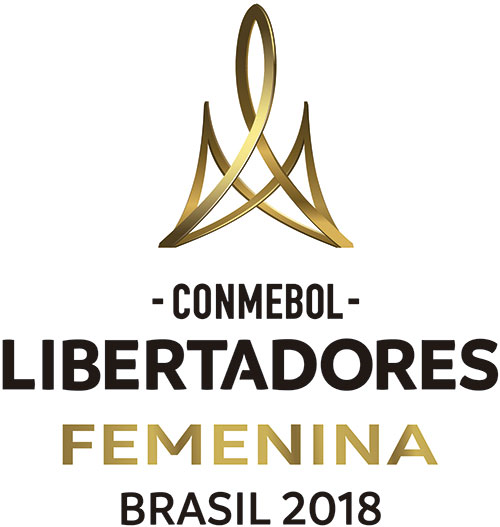

Tournament details
- Host country: Brazil
- City: Manaus
- Dates: 18 November – 2 December 2018
- Teams: 12 (from 10 associations)
- Venues: 2 (in 1 host city)

Final positions
- Champions: (Colombia) Atlético Huila (1st title)
- Runners-up: (Brazil) Santos
- Third place: (Brazil) Iranduba
- Fourth place: (Chile) Colo-Colo

Tournament statistics
- Matches played: 22
- Goals scored: 69 (3.14 per match)
- Top scorer: (Brazil) Brena (4 goals)

The 2018 Copa CONMEBOL Libertadores Femenina was the tenth edition of the CONMEBOL Libertadores Femenina (also referred to as the Copa Libertadores Femenina), South America's premier women's club football tournament organized by CONMEBOL. The tournament was held in Manaus, Brazil from 18 November to 2 December 2018.

Originally planned from 4 to 18 November the tournament was pushed back two weeks because of the 2019 FIFA Women's World Cup qualification CONCACAF–CONMEBOL play-off which clashed with the timeframe.

Atlético Huila defeated Santos in the final on penalties to win their first tournament title. Iranduba defeated Colo-Colo to finish third.

Audax were the defending champions, having won the title the previous year as a joint team with Corinthians. They were eliminated in the group stage.

== Host selection ==
There were eventually three bids for the 2018 Copa Libertadores Femenina: Manaus, Santa Cruz de la Sierra and São Paulo proposed by Iranduba, Deportivo ITA and Corinthians, respectively. On 11 June 2018, CONMEBOL announced that the tournament would be held in Manaus and Iranduba gained the host association additional berth.

== Teams ==
The competition was contested by 12 teams: the champions of all ten CONMEBOL associations were given one entry, additionally the title holders re-entered and the host association qualified one more team.

Association	Team	Qualifying method	Participation	Previous best result
Argentina	UAI Urquiza	2017–18 Campeonato Argentino champions	3rd	Third place (2015)
Bolivia	Deportivo ITA	2018 Campeonato Boliviano champions	2nd	Group stage (2017)
Brazil (hosts)	Audax	2017 Copa Libertadores Femenina champions (Note: The partnership between Audax and Corinthians ended on 31 December 2017. Corinthians created their own team for the 2018 season.)	2nd	Champions (2017)
Brazil (hosts)	Santos	2017 Campeonato Brasileiro champions	4th	Champions (2009, 2010)
Brazil (hosts)	Iranduba	Host association additional entry	1st	—
Chile	Colo-Colo	2017 Apertura and Clausura champions	8th	Champions (2012)
Colombia	Atlético Huila	2018 Liga Femenina Profesional champions	1st	—
Ecuador	Unión Española	2017–18 Campeonato Ecuatoriano champions	3rd	Group stage (2016, 2017)
Paraguay	Cerro Porteño	2017 Campeonato Paraguayo champions	5th	Third place (2014)
Peru	JC Sport Girls	2017 Campeonato Peruano champions	4th	Group stage (2011, 2012, 2013)
Uruguay	Peñarol	2017 Campeonato Uruguayo champions	1st	—
Venezuela	Flor de Patria	2018 Torneo Apertura champions	1st	—

== Venues ==
Initially two stadiums (Estádio Ismael Benigno and Arena da Amazônia) would host the tournament. On 14 November 2018, CONMEBOL announced that the Estádio Ismael Benigno would no longer host matches, and matches originally to be played there would be moved to Arena da Amazônia. During the tournament, CONMEBOL decided to move the matches scheduled on 25 and 26 November at Estádio Roberto Simonsen to protect the football field of Arena da Amazônia.

Matches were played in Manaus. The stadiums were:

- Arena da Amazônia (capacity: 44,300)
- Estádio Roberto Simonsen (capacity: 4,000)

== Draw ==
The draw for the tournament was held on 7 November 2018 (originally scheduled on 3 November), 19:00 AMT (UTC−4), at the Arena da Amazônia in Manaus. The 12 teams were drawn into three groups of four containing a team from each of the four pots. The defending champions Audax were automatically seeded into Pot 1 and allocated to position A1 in the group stage. For the remaining two teams from hosts Brazil, the first representative was seeded into Pot 2 and the second representative was seeded into Pot 4. The remaining teams were seeded based on the results of their association in the 2017 Copa Libertadores Femenina. Teams from the same association could not be drawn into the same group.

Pot 1	Pot 2	Pot 3	Pot 4
(Brazil) Audax (Position A1); (Chile) Colo-Colo; (Argentina) UAI Urquiza	(Paraguay) Cerro Porteño; (Ecuador) Unión Española; (Brazil) Santos	(Colombia) Atlético Huila; (Venezuela) Flor de Patria; (Peru) JC Sport Girls	(Uruguay) Peñarol; (Bolivia) Deportivo ITA; (Brazil) Iranduba

== Group stage ==
In the group stage, the teams were ranked according to points (3 points for a win, 1 point for a draw, 0 points for a loss). If tied on points, tiebreakers would be applied in the following order (Regulations Article 20):

1. Goal difference;
2. Goals scored;
3. Head-to-head result in games between tied teams;
4. Number of red cards;
5. Number of yellow cards;
6. Drawing of lots.

The winners of each group and the best runners-up among all groups advanced to the semi-finals.

All times are local, AMT (UTC−4).

=== Group A ===
Pos	Team	Pld	W	D	L	GF	GA	GD	Pts	Qualification
1	(Colombia) Atlético Huila	3	2	0	1	6	2	+4	6	Semi-finals
2	(Brazil) Audax (H)	3	2	0	1	5	1	+4	6	
3	(Ecuador) Unión Española	3	1	0	2	2	5	−3	3	
4	(Uruguay) Peñarol	3	1	0	2	2	7	−5	3	

Source: CBF
(H) Hosts
19 November 2018
18:00

Audax (Brazil)	0–1	(Ecuador) Unión Española
	Report	Charcopa 76'

Arena da Amazônia, Manaus
Referee: Dione Rissios (Chile)
19 November 2018
20:30

Atlético Huila (Colombia)	3–0	(Uruguay) Peñarol
Cometti 5'; Stábile 69'; Vallejos 84'	Report

Arena da Amazônia, Manaus
Referee: Yercinia Correa (Venezuela)

22 November 2018
18:00

Audax (Brazil)	1–0	(Colombia) Atlético Huila
Camila 2'	Report

Arena da Amazônia, Manaus
Referee: Zulma Quiñónez (Paraguay)
22 November 2018
20:30

Unión Española (Ecuador)	0–2	(Uruguay) Peñarol
	Report	Graña 29'; Casal 90+2'

Arena da Amazônia, Manaus
Referee: Regildênia de Holanda Moura (Brazil)

25 November 2018
18:00

Peñarol (Uruguay)	0–4	(Brazil) Audax
	Report	Kerolin 37'; Renata 38'; Victória 45+3'; Maressa 84' (pen.)

Estádio Roberto Simonsen, Manaus
Referee: Estela Álvarez (Argentina)
25 November 2018
20:30

Unión Española (Ecuador)	1–3	(Colombia) Atlético Huila
Rodríguez 61'	Report	Stábile 53'; Rincón 77'; Viso 90+2'

Estádio Roberto Simonsen, Manaus
Referee: Adriana Farfán (Bolivia)

=== Group B ===
Pos	Team	Pld	W	D	L	GF	GA	GD	Pts	Qualification
1	(Brazil) Santos (H)	3	3	0	0	13	1	+12	9	Semi-finals
2	(Chile) Colo-Colo	3	2	0	1	10	6	+4	6	Semi-finals
3	(Peru) JC Sport Girls	3	1	0	2	3	10	−7	3	
4	(Bolivia) Deportivo ITA	3	0	0	3	4	13	−9	0	

Source: CBF
(H) Hosts
20 November 2018
18:00

Colo-Colo (Chile)	1–4	(Brazil) Santos
Huenteo 54'	Report	Maria Alves 16'; Alanna 45+2'; Sandrinha 47'; Brena 90+1'

Arena da Amazônia, Manaus
Referee: Estela Álvarez (Argentina)
20 November 2018
20:30

JC Sport Girls (Peru)	3–2	(Bolivia) Deportivo ITA
Arévalo 26'; Coronel 66'; Dorador 79'	Report	Zamorano 17', 41'

Arena da Amazônia, Manaus
Referee: Silvia Ríos (Uruguay)

23 November 2018
18:00

Colo-Colo (Chile)	5–0	(Peru) JC Sport Girls
Torres 23', 55'; Balmaceda 25'; Rangel 33'; Huenteo 44'	Report

Arena da Amazônia, Manaus
Referee: Yeimy Martínez (Colombia)
23 November 2018
20:30

Santos (Brazil)	6–0	(Bolivia) Deportivo ITA
Juliete 16'; Alanna 23'; Maria Alves 45+1'; Brena 70', 71'; Camila 86'	Report

Arena da Amazônia, Manaus
Referee: Susana Corella (Ecuador)

26 November 2018
18:00

Deportivo ITA (Bolivia)	2–4	(Chile) Colo-Colo
Parra 17', 79'	Report	Quezada 6'; Pino 40'; Torres 60'; Ascanio 83'

Estádio Roberto Simonsen, Manaus
Referee: Yercinia Correa (Venezuela)
26 November 2018
20:30

Santos (Brazil)	3–0	(Peru) JC Sport Girls
Tayla 8'; Alanna 53'; Dani Silva 83' (pen.)	Report

Estádio Roberto Simonsen, Manaus
Referee: Jenny Arias (Colombia)

=== Group C ===
Pos	Team	Pld	W	D	L	GF	GA	GD	Pts	Qualification
1	(Brazil) Iranduba (H)	3	1	2	0	5	4	+1	5	Semi-finals
2	(Argentina) UAI Urquiza	3	1	2	0	3	2	+1	5	
3	(Venezuela) Flor de Patria	3	1	0	2	4	3	+1	3	
4	(Paraguay) Cerro Porteño	3	0	2	1	3	6	−3	2	

Source: CBF
(H) Hosts
18 November 2018
18:00

UAI Urquiza (Argentina)	1–1	(Paraguay) Cerro Porteño
Potassa 60'	Report	Vega 89'

Arena da Amazônia, Manaus
Referee: Edina Alves Batista (Brazil)
18 November 2018
20:30

Flor de Patria (Venezuela)	1–2	(Brazil) Iranduba
Guarecuco 76'	Report	Andressinha 42'; Ludmila 52'

Arena da Amazônia, Manaus
Referee: Susana Corella (Ecuador)

21 November 2018
18:00

UAI Urquiza (Argentina)	1–0	(Venezuela) Flor de Patria
Larroquette 9'	Report

Arena da Amazônia, Manaus
Referee: Adriana Farfán (Bolivia)
21 November 2018
20:30

Cerro Porteño (Paraguay)	2–2	(Brazil) Iranduba
Ojeda 9'; Peralta 30'	Report	Raquel 32'; Andressinha 68'

Arena da Amazônia, Manaus
Referee: Elizabeth Tintaya (Peru)

24 November 2018
18:00

Iranduba (Brazil)	1–1	(Argentina) UAI Urquiza
Raquel 90+11' (pen.)	Report	Larroquette 48' (pen.)

Arena da Amazônia, Manaus
Referee: Silvia Ríos (Uruguay)
24 November 2018
20:30

Cerro Porteño (Paraguay)	0–3	(Venezuela) Flor de Patria
	Report	Lárez 1'; Guarecuco 24'; Pe. Cabrera 87'

Arena da Amazônia, Manaus
Referee: Dione Rissios (Chile)

=== Ranking of group runners-up ===
Pos	Grp	Team	Pld	W	D	L	GF	GA	GD	Pts	Qualification
1	B	(Chile) Colo-Colo	3	2	0	1	10	6	+4	6	Semi-finals
2	A	(Brazil) Audax (H)	3	2	0	1	5	1	+4	6	
3	C	(Argentina) UAI Urquiza	3	1	2	0	3	2	+1	5	

Source: CBF
Rules for classification: 1) Points; 2) Goal difference; 3) Goals scored; 4) Drawing of lots (Regulations Article 21).
(H) Hosts

== Knockout stage ==
The semi-final matchups were:

- Group A winner vs. Group C winner
- Group B winner vs. Best runner-up

The semi-final winners and losers played in the final and third place match respectively. If tied after full time, extra time would not be played, and the penalty shoot-out would be used to determine the winner (Regulations Article 23).

=== Bracket ===
Semi-finals
29 November – Arena da Amazônia
(Brazil) Santos	3
(Chile) Colo-Colo	0
29 November – Arena da Amazônia
(Brazil) Iranduba	1 (1)
(Colombia) Atlético Huila (p)	1 (3)

Final
2 December – Arena da Amazônia
(Brazil) Santos	1 (3)
(Colombia) Atlético Huila (p)	1 (5)
Third place
2 December – Arena da Amazônia
(Brazil) Iranduba (p)	1 (2)
(Chile) Colo-Colo	1 (0)

=== Semi-finals ===
29 November 2018
18:00

Iranduba (Brazil)	1–1	(Colombia) Atlético Huila
Mayara 26'	Report	Martelli 82'
Penalties
Andressinha (penalty missed); Camilinha (penalty scored); Monalisa (penalty missed); Kélen (penalty missed)	1–3	(penalty scored) Rodallega; (penalty scored) Stábile; (penalty scored) Vallejos

Arena da Amazônia, Manaus
Referee: Estela Álvarez (Argentina)

29 November 2018
20:30

Santos (Brazil)	3–0	(Chile) Colo-Colo
Chú 65', 67'; Sandrinha 85'	Report

Arena da Amazônia, Manaus
Referee: Elizabeth Tintaya (Peru)

=== Third place match ===
2 December 2018
16:30

Iranduba (Brazil)	1–1	(Chile) Colo-Colo
Djeni 44'	Report	Rangel 62'
Penalties
Camilinha (penalty scored); Cris (penalty missed); Ludmila (penalty scored)	2–0	(penalty missed) Rangel; (penalty missed) Jiménez; (penalty missed) Quezada; (penalty missed) Torres

Arena da Amazônia, Manaus
Referee: Yercinia Correa (Venezuela)

=== Final ===
2 December 2018
19:30

Santos (Brazil)	1–1	(Colombia) Atlético Huila
Brena 2'	Report	Santos 47'
Penalties
Maurine (penalty scored); Camila (penalty scored); Juliete (penalty scored); Angelina (penalty missed)	3–5	(penalty scored) Rodallega; (penalty scored) Stábile; (penalty scored) Vallejos; (penalty scored) Cometti; (penalty scored) Rincón

Arena da Amazônia, Manaus
Referee: Zulma Quiñónez (Paraguay)

Santos	Atlético Huila

GK	12	(Brazil) Nicole
DF	4	(Brazil) Maurine
DF	2	(Brazil) Carol Arruda (c)
DF	6	(Brazil) Camila
DF	3	(Brazil) Juliete
MF	5	(Brazil) Brena		(substituted off) 68'
MF	8	(Brazil) Sandrinha
MF	17	(Brazil) Angelina
FW	10	(Brazil) Alanna
FW	11	(Brazil) Ketlen		(substituted off) 58'
FW	20	(Brazil) Maria Alves
Substitutes:
GK	1	(Brazil) Michelle
DF	14	(Brazil) Tayla
DF	15	(Brazil) Dani Silva
MF	13	(Brazil) Giovana
MF	16	(Brazil) Monique Peçanha
MF	18	(Brazil) Erikinha
MF	19	(Brazil) Patrícia Sochor
FW	7	(Brazil) Chú		(substituted on) 68'
FW	9	(Brazil) Rosana	(yellow card) 90+2'	(substituted on) 58'
Manager:
(Portugal) Emily Lima

GK	18	(Costa Rica) Daniela Solera
DF	5	(Colombia) Carmen Rodallega
DF	13	(Colombia) Gavy Santos (c)
DF	20	(Argentina) Aldana Cometti	(yellow card) 43'
DF	15	(Colombia) Daniela Caracas
MF	16	(Colombia) Jennifer Peñaloza		(substituted off) 46'
MF	19	(Argentina) Fabiana Vallejos
MF	8	(Colombia) Liana Salazar	(yellow card) 88'
MF	14	(Colombia) Darnelly Quintero		(substituted off) 46'
FW	10	(Colombia) Yoreli Rincón
FW	9	(Venezuela) Ysaura Viso
Substitutes:
GK	1	(Colombia) Maritza López
DF	3	(Argentina) Eliana Stábile		(substituted on) 46'
DF	4	(Venezuela) Alexandra Canaguacán
DF	6	(Colombia) Levis Ramos
MF	2	(Colombia) Nancy Madrid
FW	11	(Colombia) Nelly Córdoba		(substituted on) 46'
FW	12	(Argentina) Lucía Martelli
Manager:
(Colombia) Albeiro Erazo

== Top goalscorers ==
Rank	Player	Team	Goals
1	(Brazil) Brena	(Brazil) Santos	4
2	(Brazil) Alanna	(Brazil) Santos	3
2	(Venezuela) Karla Torres	(Chile) Colo-Colo	3
4	(Brazil) Andressinha	(Brazil) Iranduba	2
4	(Brazil) Chú	(Brazil) Santos	2
4	(Venezuela) Joemar Guarecuco	(Venezuela) Flor de Patria	2
4	(Chile) Yessenia Huenteo	(Chile) Colo-Colo	2
4	(Argentina) Mariana Larroquette	(Argentina) UAI Urquiza	2
4	(Brazil) Maria Alves	(Brazil) Santos	2
4	(Venezuela) Jyoeldry Parra	(Bolivia) Deportivo ITA	2
4	(Brazil) Raquel	(Brazil) Iranduba	2
4	(Venezuela) Nubiluz Rangel	(Chile) Colo-Colo	2
4	(Brazil) Sandrinha	(Brazil) Santos	2
4	(Argentina) Eliana Stábile	(Colombia) Atlético Huila	2
4	(Bolivia) Maitté Zamorano	(Bolivia) Deportivo ITA	2
