= Grana =

Grana may refer to:

== Places ==
- Grana, Varaždin County, Croatia, a village
- Grana, Germany, a municipality in Saxony-Anhalt
- Grana, Piedmont, Italy, a commune in the Province of Asti
- Grana, Galicia, Spain, a municipality
- A Graña, A Coruña, Spain, a village and naval station

== People ==
- Ariel Damian Grana (born 1976), Argentinian footballer, also known as Ariel Grana
- César Graña (1919–1986), American sociologist and anthropologist of Peruvian origin
- Hernán Grana (born 1985), Argentine football defender
- Lorena Johana Graña Fernández (born 1997), Uruguayan footballer
- Octavio De La Grana (born 1961), Cuban-American basketball coach
- Pablo Graña (born 1999), Spanish sprint canoeist
- Rosa Graña Garland (1909–2003), Peruvian fashion designer and costumer also known as Mocha Graña
- Saverio (Sam) Grana, Canadian television and film producer and screenwriter

== Other uses ==
- The plural of grano, one 120th of a piastra
- Grana (fashion company), based in Hong Kong
- Grana (sing.: granum), thylakoid stacks in chloroplasts
- Grana (cheese), a class of hard cheeses such as Parmesan (Parmigiano Reggiano) and Grana Padano
- Grana (journal), a scientific journal for palynology and aerobiology, published in Stockholm
