= 2018 Colombian Women's Football League =

Liga Águila Femenina
- Season: 2018
- Dates: 10 February – 31 May 2018
- Champions: Atlético Huila (1st title)
- Copa Libertadores Femenina: Atlético Huila
- Matches played: 124
- Goals scored: 367 (2.96 per match)
- Top goalscorer: Oriana Altuve (16 goals)
- Biggest home win: Santa Fe 10–0 Bogotá (17 February)
- Biggest away win: Bogotá 1–9 Patriotas (28 February)
- Highest scoring: Santa Fe 10–0 Bogotá (17 February); Bogotá 1–9 Patriotas (28 February)

The 2018 Colombian Women's Football League season (officially known as the 2018 Liga Águila Femenina season for sponsorship reasons) was the second season of Colombia's top-flight women's football league. The season started on 10 February and concluded on 31 May 2018. Santa Fe were the defending champions.

The two-legged final was played between Atlético Huila and debutants Atlético Nacional. Atlético Huila were the champions after tying Atlético Nacional 2–2 in aggregate score and beating them 3–0 in the penalty shootout, and qualified for the 2018 Copa Libertadores Femenina.

== Format ==
Starting from this season, the league was expanded from 18 to 23 teams, which competed in four double round-robin groups, three of six teams each and one of five teams. The top two teams in each group moved on to the quarterfinals, with the winners advancing to the semifinals. The winners of each semifinal played the finals, which determined the champions. All rounds in the knockout stage were played on a home-and-away basis. The champions qualified for the 2018 Copa Libertadores Femenina and also played the 2017–18 Primera División Femenina champions in a double-legged series, same as last season.

== Teams ==
23 teams took part in the competition. The teams are affiliated with DIMAYOR affiliate clubs. Atlético, Atlético Nacional, Bogotá, Deportes Tolima, and Junior competed for the first time.

=== Stadia and locations ===
Locations of the 2018 Liga Águila Femenina teams

Hexagonal	Team	City	Stadium
A	Alianza Petrolera	Barrancabermeja	Daniel Villa Zapata
A	Atlético Bucaramanga	Bucaramanga	Cancha Marte
A	Atlético Huila	Neiva	Guillermo Plazas Alcid
A	Cúcuta Deportivo	Cúcuta	General Santander
A	Deportes Tolima	Ibagué	Manuel Murillo Toro
A	Real Santander	Floridablanca	Álvaro Gómez Hurtado
B	Bogotá	Bogotá^{a}	Municipal Héctor "El Zipa" González
B	Deportivo Pasto	Pasto	Departamental Libertad
B	Fortaleza	Cota	Municipal de Cota
B	La Equidad	Bogotá	Metropolitano de Techo
B	Patriotas	Tunja^{b}	Primero de Septiembre
B	Santa Fe	Bogotá	Nemesio Camacho El Campín
C	América de Cali	Cali	Pascual Guerrero
C	Atlético	Cali	Pascual Guerrero
C	Cortuluá	Tuluá^{c}	Pascual Guerrero
C	Deportes Quindío	Armenia	Centenario
C	Deportivo Pereira	Pereira	Hernán Ramírez Villegas
C	Orsomarso	Palmira	Francisco Rivera Escobar
D	Atlético Nacional	Medellín	Atanasio Girardot
D	Envigado	Envigado	Polideportivo Sur
D	Junior	Barranquilla	Metropolitano Roberto Meléndez
D	Real Cartagena	Cartagena	Jaime Morón León
D	Unión Magdalena	Santa Marta	Sierra Nevada

a: Played home games in Zipaquirá.
b: Played home games in Chiquinquirá.
c: Played home games in Cali.

== First stage ==
The first stage started on 10 February and consisted of four round-robin hexagonals. It ended on 6 May with the top two teams from each group advancing to the knockout round.

=== Group A ===
Pos	Team	Pld	W	D	L	GF	GA	GD	Pts	Qualification	HUI	TOL	APE	CUC	BUC	RSA
1	Atlético Huila	10	8	1	1	22	3	+19	25	Advance to the knockout phase	—	2–1	2–0	4–0	2–0	4–0
2	Deportes Tolima	10	4	4	2	13	11	+2	16	Advance to the knockout phase	1–0	—	0–1	2–1	3–2	2–1
3	Alianza Petrolera	10	4	3	3	10	10	0	15		0–3	1–1	—	2–2	1–0	3–0
4	Cúcuta Deportivo	10	3	4	3	14	17	−3	13		0–3	1–1	1–1	—	2–1	5–2
5	Atlético Bucaramanga	10	2	1	7	7	14	−7	7		0–1	0–0	1–0	0–1	—	1–3
6	Real Santander	10	1	3	6	11	22	−11	6		1–1	2–2	0–1	1–1	1–2	—

Source: Dimayor, Soccerway
Rules for classification: 1) Points, 2) Goal difference, 3) Goals for, 4) Away goals for, 5) Goals against, 6) Drawing of lots

=== Group B ===
Pos	Team	Pld	W	D	L	GF	GA	GD	Pts	Qualification	SFE	PAT	FOR	EQU	BOG	PAS
1	Santa Fe	10	8	1	1	37	6	+31	25	Advance to the knockout phase	—	2–0	6–0	4–0	10–0	2–0
2	Patriotas	10	6	2	2	22	8	+14	20	Advance to the knockout phase	1–0	—	2–1	0–1	1–0	3–0
3	Fortaleza	10	4	4	2	14	13	+1	16		2–2	2–2	—	2–1	1–0	3–0
4	La Equidad	10	4	3	3	11	10	+1	15		0–2	1–1	0–0	—	3–0	1–0
5	Bogotá	10	1	3	6	6	29	−23	6		2–3	1–9	0–0	1–1	—	1–0
6	Deportivo Pasto	10	0	1	9	2	26	−24	1		1–6	0–3	0–3	0–3	1–1	—

Source: Dimayor, Soccerway
Rules for classification: 1) Points, 2) Goal difference, 3) Goals for, 4) Away goals for, 5) Goals against, 6) Drawing of lots

=== Group C ===
Pos	Team	Pld	W	D	L	GF	GA	GD	Pts	Qualification	AME	COR	PER	QUI	ORS	ATL
1	América de Cali	10	7	1	2	26	12	+14	22	Advance to the knockout phase	—	1–1	0–3 (Note: Match awarded 3–0 to Deportivo Pereira due to América de Cali presenting in its lineup more players than allowed by the tournament's regulations. The original result was a 4–0 win for América de Cali.)	4–1	3–1	2–0
2	Cortuluá	10	6	2	2	20	8	+12	20	Advance to the knockout phase	2–3	—	3–0	2–0	0–1	4–1
3	Deportivo Pereira	10	6	1	3	15	12	+3	19		2–0	0–2	—	2–3	2–1	2–1
4	Deportes Quindío	10	3	3	4	21	20	+1	12		1–4	1–4	1–1	—	4–1	8–0
5	Orsomarso	10	3	2	5	14	17	−3	11		1–2	1–1	1–2	0–0	—	4–1
6	Atlético	10	0	1	9	7	34	−27	1		0–7	0–1	0–1	2–2	2–3	—

Source: Dimayor, Soccerway
Rules for classification: 1) Points, 2) Goal difference, 3) Goals for, 4) Away goals for, 5) Goals against, 6) Drawing of lots

=== Group D ===
Pos	Team	Pld	W	D	L	GF	GA	GD	Pts	Qualification	NAC	MAG	ENV	JUN	RCA
1	Atlético Nacional	8	6	1	1	16	3	+13	19	Advance to the knockout phase	—	3–1	2–1	3–0	2–0
2	Unión Magdalena	8	5	1	2	13	6	+7	16	Advance to the knockout phase	0–0	—	1–0	1–0	4–0
3	Envigado	8	3	2	3	9	5	+4	11		1–0	0–1	—	0–0	5–1
4	Junior	8	3	2	3	9	7	+2	11		0–1	2–1	0–0	—	4–0
5	Real Cartagena	8	0	0	8	3	29	−26	0		0–5	1–4	0–2	1–3	—

Source: Dimayor, Soccerway
Rules for classification: 1) Points, 2) Goal difference, 3) Goals for, 4) Away goals for, 5) Goals against, 6) Drawing of lots

== Knockout phase ==
=== Bracket ===
Quarterfinals
1A	Atlético Huila	4	2	6
2D	Unión Magdalena	0	0	0
1C	América de Cali	0	5	5
2B	Patriotas	2	0	2
1B	Santa Fe	4	3	7
2C	Cortuluá	0	1	1
1D	Atlético Nacional	3	3	6
2A	Deportes Tolima	0	0	0

Semifinals
Atlético Huila	3	2	5
América de Cali	1	0	1
Santa Fe	1	2	3
Atlético Nacional	1	3	4

Finals
Atlético Huila (p)	0	2	2 (3)
Atlético Nacional	1	1	2 (0)

=== Quarterfinals ===
Team 1	Agg.	Team 2	1st leg	2nd leg
Atlético Huila	6–0	Unión Magdalena	4–0	2–0
Santa Fe	7–1	Cortuluá	4–0	3–1
América de Cali	5–2	Patriotas	0–2	5–0
Atlético Nacional	6–0	Deportes Tolima	3–0	3–0

==== First leg ====
10 May 2018	Unión Magdalena	0–4	Atlético Huila	Ciénaga
15:30		Report	Torres 12'; Rincón 21'; Oliveros 80'; Córdoba 83'	Stadium: Estadio Municipal de Ciénaga; Referee: Heider Castro

10 May 2018	Cortuluá	0–4	Santa Fe	Palmira
16:00		Report	Altuve 48', 52'; Salazar 59'; Santos 68'	Stadium: Estadio Francisco Rivera Escobar; Referee: Vanessa Ceballos

10 May 2018	Patriotas	2–0	América de Cali	Tunja
19:00	Villamayor 61'; Alvarado 81'	Report		Stadium: Estadio La Independencia; Referee: Andrea Chavarría

10 May 2018	Deportes Tolima	0–3	Atlético Nacional	Ibagué
19:30		Report	Arbeláez 41'; González 61'; Hurtado 77'	Stadium: Estadio Manuel Murillo Toro; Referee: Viviana Muñoz

==== Second leg ====
13 May 2018	Atlético Nacional	3–0 (6–0 agg.)	Deportes Tolima	Medellín
15:15	Andrade 11'; Hurtado 22'; Pion 71' (pen.)	Report		Stadium: Estadio Atanasio Girardot; Referee: Ruth Nathaly Martínez

13 May 2018	Atlético Huila	2–0 (6–0 agg.)	Unión Magdalena	Neiva
17:30	Castillo 61' (o.g.); Torres 66'	Report		Stadium: Club Comfamiliar Los Lagos; Referee: Paula Fernández

14 May 2018	Santa Fe	3–1 (7–1 agg.)	Cortuluá	Bogotá
13:00	Altuve 62'; Salazar 78'; Santos 81'	Report	Guarecuco 7'	Stadium: Estadio Metropolitano de Techo; Referee: María Victoria Daza
Note: The match originally kicked off at Estadio Campincito on 13 May at 15:00 but was suspended after 32 minutes due to heavy rain. It resumed on 14 May at 13:00.

14 May 2018	América de Cali	5–0 (5–2 agg.)	Patriotas	Palmira
15:15	Caicedo 41', 69'; Franco 53', 79'; Usme 73'	Report		Stadium: Estadio Francisco Rivera Escobar; Referee: Yessica María Vásquez

=== Semifinals ===
Team 1	Agg.	Team 2	1st leg	2nd leg
América de Cali	1–5	Atlético Huila	1–3	0–2
Atlético Nacional	4–3	Santa Fe	1–1	3–2

==== First leg ====
17 May 2018	América de Cali	1–3	Atlético Huila	Cali
18:00	Usme 69'	Report	Quintero 16'; Torres 50'; Rincón 53'	Stadium: Estadio Pascual Guerrero; Referee: Jenny Arias

17 May 2018	Atlético Nacional	1–1	Santa Fe	Itagüí
20:00	Andrade 89' (pen.)	Report	Altuve 31'	Stadium: Estadio Metropolitano Ciudad de Itagüí; Referee: Viviana Muñoz

==== Second leg ====
20 May 2018	Santa Fe	2–3 (3–4 agg.)	Atlético Nacional	Bogotá
14:00	Rangel 20' (o.g.); Salazar 60'	Report	Bedoya 10'; González 45+3', 46'	Stadium: Estadio El Campín; Referee: Vanessa Ceballos

20 May 2018	Atlético Huila	2–0 (5–1 agg.)	América de Cali	Neiva
16:00	Rincón 15'; Torres 46'	Report		Stadium: Estadio Guillermo Plazas Alcid; Referee: María Victoria Daza

=== Finals ===
23 May 2018
19:30 UTC−5

Atlético Nacional	1–0	Atlético Huila
Andrade 64'	Report

Estadio Polideportivo Sur, Envigado
Referee: Viviana Muñoz

31 May 2018
18:30 UTC−5

Atlético Huila	2–1	Atlético Nacional
Vidal 11'; Vallejos 75'	Report	Andrade 46'
Penalties
Rodallega (penalty scored); Oliveros (penalty missed); Vallejos (penalty scored); Cometti (penalty scored)	3–0	(penalty missed) Andrade; (penalty missed) Arbeláez; (penalty missed) Pion

Estadio Guillermo Plazas Alcid, Neiva
Referee: María Victoria Daza

Tied 2–2 on aggregate, Atlético Huila won 3–0 on penalties.

Liga Águila Femenina
2018 champions
Atlético Huila
1st title

== Top goalscorers ==
Rank	Name	Club	Goals
1	(Venezuela) Oriana Altuve	Santa Fe	16
2	(Colombia) Leicy Santos	Santa Fe	12
3	(Venezuela) Joemar Guarecuco	Cortuluá	11
4	(Colombia) Catalina Usme	América de Cali	9
4	(Venezuela) Karla Torres	Atlético Huila	9
6	(Panama) Marta Cox	Deportes Quindío	8
6	(Colombia) Farlyn Caicedo	América de Cali	8
8	(Colombia) Lady Andrade	Atlético Nacional	7
8	(Paraguay) Gloria Villamayor	Patriotas	7
8	(Venezuela) Jyoeldry Parra	Deportivo Pereira	7

Source: Fémina Fútbol

== See also ==
- Colombian Women's Football League
