= 2010 South American U-20 Women's Championship =

Tournament details
- Host country: Colombia
- City: Bucaramanga
- Dates: 3–17 March
- Teams: 10 (from 1 confederation)
- Venue: 1 (in 1 host city)

Final positions
- Champions: Brazil (4th title)
- Runners-up: Colombia
- Third place: Paraguay
- Fourth place: Chile

Tournament statistics
- Matches played: 24
- Goals scored: 79 (3.29 per match)
- Top scorer: (Brazil) Alanna (7)

The 2010 South American Under-20 Women's Football Championship was the 4th instance of the South American Under-20 Women Championship. It was held from 3 to 17 March in Bucaramanga, Colombia. All matches were played at the Estadio Alfonso Lopez. The winners, Brazil, and the runners-up, Colombia, qualified for 2010 FIFA U-20 Women's World Cup held in Germany.

== Group stage ==
=== Group A ===
Team	Pld	W	D	L	GF	GA	GD	Pts
Colombia	4	4	0	0	8	2	+6	12
Chile	4	3	0	1	6	2	+4	9
Ecuador	4	2	0	2	4	4	0	6
Argentina	4	1	0	3	2	4	−2	3
Bolivia	4	0	0	4	0	8	−8	0

All times are local (UTC-5).

3 March 2010
18:00

Argentina	0–1	Chile
	Report (CONMEBOL)	Zamora 30'

Estadio Alfonso Lopez, Bucaramanga
Attendance: 2,000
Referee: Ana Marques (Brazil)
3 March 2010
20:00

Colombia	3–1	Ecuador
Rincón 6', 69'; P. Sánchez 75'	Report (CONMEBOL)	Ortiz 25'

Estadio Alfonso Lopez, Bucaramanga
Attendance: 2,000

5 March 2010
18:00

Ecuador	2–0	Bolivia
Ferrín 19'; Ortiz 30'	Report (CONMEBOL)

Estadio Alfonso Lopez, Bucaramanga
Attendance: 2,000
5 March 2010
20:00

Colombia	2–1	Chile
Ariza 4'; Rincón 87' (pen.)	Report (CONMEBOL)	Moya 71'

Estadio Alfonso Lopez, Bucaramanga
Attendance: 2,000

7 March 2010
18:00

Chile	1–0	Ecuador
Espinoza 88'	Report (CONMEBOL)

Estadio Alfonso Lopez, Bucaramanga
Attendance: 2,000
7 March 2010
20:00

Argentina	2–0	Bolivia
Soriano 65', 80'	Report (CONMEBOL)

Estadio Alfonso Lopez, Bucaramanga
Attendance: 2,000

9 March 2010
18:00

Chile	3–0	Bolivia
Maquiavello 62'; Araya 85'; Huenteo 90'	Report (CONMEBOL)

Estadio Alfonso Lopez, Bucaramanga
Attendance: 2,000
9 March 2010
20:00

Colombia	2–0	Argentina
Arias 10'; P. Sánchez 80'	Report (CONMEBOL)

Estadio Alfonso Lopez, Bucaramanga
Attendance: 2,000

11 March 2010
18:00

Argentina	0–1	Ecuador
	Report (CONMEBOL)	Ferrín 16'

Estadio Alfonso Lopez, Bucaramanga
Attendance: 2,000
11 March 2010
20:00

Colombia	1–0	Bolivia
Aponte 22'	Report (CONMEBOL)

Estadio Alfonso Lopez, Bucaramanga
Attendance: 2,000

=== Group B ===
Team	Pld	W	D	L	GF	GA	GD	Pts
Brazil	4	4	0	0	20	2	+18	12
Paraguay	4	3	0	1	13	3	+10	9
Venezuela	4	2	0	2	6	8	−2	6
Uruguay	4	1	0	3	4	15	−11	3
Peru	4	0	0	4	1	16	−15	0

All times are local (UTC-5).

4 March 2010
18:00

Uruguay	3–1	Peru
	(Report)

Estadio Alfonso Lopez, Bucaramanga
Attendance: 2,000
4 March 2010
20:00

Brazil	4–1	Venezuela
	(Report)

Estadio Alfonso Lopez, Bucaramanga
Attendance: 2,000

6 March 2010
18:00

Peru	0–3	Venezuela
	(Report)

Estadio Alfonso Lopez, Bucaramanga
Attendance: 2,000
6 March 2010
20:00

Uruguay	0–5	Paraguay
	(Report)

Estadio Alfonso Lopez, Bucaramanga
Attendance: 2,000

8 March 2010
18:00

Peru	0–4	Paraguay
	(Report)

Estadio Alfonso Lopez, Bucaramanga
Attendance: 2,000
8 March 2010
20:00

Brazil	7–0	Uruguay
	(Report)

Estadio Alfonso Lopez, Bucaramanga
Attendance: 2,000

10 March 2010
18:00

Paraguay	3–0	Venezuela
	(Report)

Estadio Alfonso Lopez, Bucaramanga
Attendance: 2,000
10 March 2010
20:00

Brazil	6–0	Peru
	(Report)

Estadio Alfonso Lopez, Bucaramanga
Attendance: 2,000

12 March 2010
18:00

Uruguay	1–2	Venezuela
	(Report)

Estadio Alfonso Lopez, Bucaramanga
Attendance: 2,000
12 March 2010
20:00

Brazil	3–1	Paraguay
	(Report)

Estadio Alfonso Lopez, Bucaramanga
Attendance: 2,000

== Knockout stage ==
The winners of the two semifinal matches will qualify directly to the 2010 FIFA U-20 Women's World Cup held in Germany.

Semi-finals
March 15
Colombia	2
Paraguay	1
March 15
Brazil	3
Chile	1

Final
17 March
Colombia	0
Brazil	2
Third place
17 March
Paraguay	6
Chile	0

=== Semi-finals ===
15 March 2010
20:00

Colombia	2–1	Paraguay

Estadio Alfonso Lopez, Bucaramanga

15 March 2010
18:00

Brazil	3–1	Chile

Estadio Alfonso Lopez, Bucaramanga

=== Third place match ===
17 March 2010

Paraguay	6–0	Chile

Estadio Alfonso Lopez, Bucaramanga

=== Final ===
17 March 2010

Colombia	0–2	Brazil

Estadio Alfonso Lopez, Bucaramanga

2010 Women's Under-20 South American champions

Brazil
Fourth title

== Top scorer ==
Alanna from Brazil won the top-scorer award with 7 goals. She led Paraguay's Ana Fleitas who scored 6 goals.
