= 2022 Colombian Women's Football League =

Liga Femenina BetPlay DIMAYOR
- Season: 2022
- Dates: 18 February – 5 June 2022
- Champions: América de Cali (2nd title)
- Copa Libertadores Femenina: América de Cali; Deportivo Cali
- Matches: 150
- Goals: 384 (2.56 per match)
- Top goalscorer: Catalina Usme (15 goals)
- Biggest home win: Deportivo Cali 7–0 Real Santander (25 March)
- Biggest away win: Llaneros 0–6 Santa Fe (15 May)
- Highest scoring: Santa Fe 7–1 La Equidad (14 April)

The 2022 Colombian Women's Football League (officially known as the Liga Femenina BetPlay DIMAYOR 2022 for sponsorship purposes) was the sixth season of Colombia's women's football league. The season started on 18 February and ended on 5 June 2022.

América de Cali won their second title in the competition, defeating the defending champions Deportivo Cali in the finals by a 4–3 aggregate score.

== Format ==
On 13 January 2022, the División Mayor del Fútbol Profesional Colombiano (DIMAYOR) confirmed the format for the 2022 Liga Femenina season, following a meeting of its Board of Competition. For this season the league had 17 teams competing as well as a change of format for the first stage, which was played as a single round-robin tournament with all teams playing each other once and having a bye day, instead of the group stage used in previous editions of the tournament. The top eight teams at the end of the first stage advanced to the quarter-finals, with the winners advancing to the semi-finals. The winners of each semi-final advanced to the finals to decide the champions. All rounds in the knockout stage were played on a home-and-away, double-legged basis. The champions and runners-up qualified for the 2022 Copa Libertadores Femenina.

On 5 June 2022, prior to the second leg of the Liga Femenina finals between América de Cali and Deportivo Cali, DIMAYOR and the Ministry of Sports of Colombia announced that a second tournament would be held in the second semester of 2022 after the latter announced an additional investment of 1.2 billion COP to the tournament. The Torneo II was expected to begin in August and end in October, prior to the start of the Copa Libertadores Femenina, however, on 7 July 2022 DIMAYOR announced that the second tournament had been cancelled given that only seven teams had confirmed their participation.

== Teams ==
17 DIMAYOR affiliate clubs took part in the competition with their women's teams. No teams from the previous season withdrew, whilst Junior, Deportes Tolima, Deportivo Pereira, Orsomarso and former champions Atlético Huila returned to the competition for this season. Cortuluá, who withdrew from the previous season due to financial reasons, also fielded a team for this season.

=== Stadia and locations ===
Locations of the 2022 Liga Femenina teams

Team	City	Stadium	Capacity
América de Cali	Cali	Pascual Guerrero	33,130
Atlético Bucaramanga	Bucaramanga	Alfonso López	25,000
Atlético Huila	Neiva	Guillermo Plazas Alcid	2,500
Atlético Nacional	Medellín	Atanasio Girardot	40,043
Cortuluá	Tuluá	Doce de Octubre	16,000
Deportes Tolima	Ibagué	Manuel Murillo Toro	28,100
Deportivo Cali	Palmira	Deportivo Cali	44,000
Deportivo Pereira	Pereira	Hernán Ramírez Villegas	30,297
Fortaleza	Chía	Villa Olímpica	1,000
Independiente Medellín	Medellín	Atanasio Girardot	40,043
Junior	Barranquilla	Metropolitano Roberto Meléndez	49,692
La Equidad	Bogotá	Metropolitano de Techo	8,000
Llaneros	Villavicencio	Bello Horizonte	15,000
Millonarios	Bogotá	Nemesio Camacho El Campín	36,343
Orsomarso	Palmira	Francisco Rivera Escobar	15,000
Real Santander	Piedecuesta	Villa Concha	4,500
Santa Fe	Bogotá	Nemesio Camacho El Campín	36,343

== First stage ==
The first stage started on 20 February and consisted of a single-round robin tournament with the 17 participating teams playing each other once. It ended on 9 May with the top eight teams advancing to the knockout stage.

=== Standings ===
Pos	Team	Pld	W	D	L	GF	GA	GD	Pts	Qualification
1	América de Cali	16	13	2	1	40	8	+32	41 (Note: Away goals for: América de Cali 23, Santa Fe 18.)	Advance to the knockout stage
2	Santa Fe	16	13	2	1	40	8	+32	41	Advance to the knockout stage
3	Deportivo Cali	16	12	1	3	38	12	+26	37	Advance to the knockout stage
4	Independiente Medellín	16	9	3	4	22	15	+7	30	Advance to the knockout stage
5	Millonarios	16	8	2	6	16	12	+4	26	Advance to the knockout stage
6	Deportivo Pereira	16	7	3	6	18	16	+2	24	Advance to the knockout stage
7	Junior	16	7	2	7	20	17	+3	23	Advance to the knockout stage
8	Llaneros	16	6	3	7	20	21	−1	21	Advance to the knockout stage
9	Orsomarso	16	5	6	5	18	20	−2	21	
10	Deportes Tolima	16	5	6	5	19	22	−3	21	
11	Atlético Nacional	16	5	4	7	16	24	−8	19	
12	Atlético Huila	16	4	4	8	20	24	−4	16	
13	Cortuluá	16	5	1	10	15	25	−10	16	
14	Atlético Bucaramanga	16	3	4	9	9	21	−12	13	
15	La Equidad	16	4	1	11	15	32	−17	13	
16	Real Santander	16	2	4	10	11	42	−31	10	
17	Fortaleza	16	1	6	9	9	27	−18	9	

Source: Dimayor, Soccerway
Rules for classification: 1) Points, 2) Goal difference, 3) Goals for, 4) Away goals for, 5) Away goals against, 6) Drawing of lots.

=== Results ===
Home \ Away	AME	BUC	HUI	NAC	COR	TOL	CAL	PER	FOR	DIM	JUN	EQU	LLA	MIL	ORS	RSA	SFE
América de Cali	—	—	1–0	3–0	2–1	5–1	—	—	—	1–2	—	—	—	1–0	2–0	—	2–2
Atlético Bucaramanga	0–1	—	—	0–0	—	—	2–1	0–1	1–1	—	—	—	0–2	1–2	—	2–0	—
Atlético Huila	—	3–1	—	—	3–0	1–1	—	0–2	—	1–1	2–0	1–2	—	—	—	—	1–3
Atlético Nacional	—	—	1–0	—	3–1	1–3	—	—	—	1–3	1–0	3–0	—	—	2–2	—	0–4
Cortuluá	—	1–0	—	—	—	0–1	1–3	0–1	1–0	—	1–2	2–1	1–1	—	—	—	—
Deportes Tolima	—	0–0	—	—	—	—	0–2	2–1	1–1	—	0–0	2–0	0–1	—	—	3–0	—
Deportivo Cali	0–4	—	2–0	4–1	—	—	—	—	3–0	—	—	—	1–0	2–0	4–0	7–0	—
Deportivo Pereira	1–1	—	—	0–1	—	—	2–1	—	1–1	—	—	—	1–1	0–1	1–2	2–1	—
Fortaleza	0–3	—	2–1	1–1	—	—	—	—	—	—	—	—	0–1	0–2	0–0	1–1	0–1
Independiente Medellín	—	0–1	—	—	0–1	2–2	0–2	2–1	3–1	—	1–0	3–0	—	—	—	—	—
Junior	0–2	4–0	—	—	—	—	1–4	2–1	4–0	—	—	—	2–0	0–2	—	3–0	—
La Equidad	0–4	1–0	—	—	—	—	1–2	0–1	3–1	—	0–1	—	0–1	—	—	4–1	—
Llaneros	0–3	—	2–2	2–1	—	—	—	—	—	1–2	—	—	—	0–2	1–2	6–1	1–3
Millonarios	—	—	0–1	0–0	1–0	1–1	—	—	—	1–2	—	2–1	—	—	2–0	—	0–2
Orsomarso	—	0–0	3–1	—	3–1	4–2	—	—	—	0–1	1–1	1–1	—	—	—	—	0–1
Real Santander	1–5	—	3–3	1–0	1–4	—	—	—	—	0–0	—	—	—	1–0	0–0	—	0–2
Santa Fe	—	4–1	—	—	3–0	3–0	0–0	1–2	—	2–0	2–0	7–1	—	—	—	—	—

Source: Dimayor, Soccerway
Legend: Blue = home team win; Yellow = draw; Red = away team win.

== Knockout stage ==
=== Bracket ===
Quarter-finals
Millonarios	1	1	2
3	Deportivo Cali	2	1	3
Llaneros	0	0	0
2	Santa Fe	6	4	10
Deportivo Pereira	1	0	1
4	Independiente Medellín	0	0	0
Junior	2	0	2
1	América de Cali	4	2	6

Semi-finals
Deportivo Cali (p)	1	1	2 (4)
Santa Fe	1	1	2 (2)
Deportivo Pereira	0	0	0
América de Cali	0	2	2

Finals
Deportivo Cali	2	1	3
América de Cali	1	3	4

=== Quarter-finals ===
Team 1	Agg.	Team 2	1st leg	2nd leg
Junior	2–6	América de Cali	2–4	0–2
Llaneros	0–10	Santa Fe	0–6	0–4
Millonarios	2–3	Deportivo Cali	1–2	1–1
Deportivo Pereira	1–0	Independiente Medellín	1–0	0–0

==== First leg ====
14 May 2022	Millonarios	1–2	Deportivo Cali	Bogotá
15:00 UTC−5	Múnera 6'	Report	F. Caicedo 35'; L. Caicedo 57'	Stadium: El Campín; Referee: Karen Lozano

15 May 2022	Deportivo Pereira	1–0	Independiente Medellín	Pereira
11:00 UTC−5	Montillo 25'	Report		Stadium: Hernán Ramírez Villegas; Referee: Marcela Suárez

15 May 2022	Llaneros	0–6	Santa Fe	Villavicencio
15:00 UTC−5		Report	Romero 29', 43', 56'; Vallejos 35'; Gómez 72'; Centeno 90+2'	Stadium: Bello Horizonte; Referee: Luisa Fernanda Martínez

15 May 2022	Junior	2–4	América de Cali	Barranquilla
17:00 UTC−5	Cartagena 17'; Acosta 89'	Report	Zamorano 18', 48'; Usme 24'; Vidal 82'	Stadium: Romelio Martínez; Referee: Yeimy Martínez

==== Second leg ====
17 May 2022	Deportivo Cali	1–1 (3–2 agg.)	Millonarios	Palmira
15:00 UTC−5	Ariza 63'	Report	Calvo 4'	Stadium: Deportivo Cali; Referee: Maria Victoria Daza

18 May 2022	América de Cali	2–0 (6–2 agg.)	Junior	Cali
17:45 UTC−5	Zamorano 68'; Bonilla 73'	Report		Stadium: Pascual Guerrero; Referee: Paula Fernández

18 May 2022	Independiente Medellín	0–0 (0–1 agg.)	Deportivo Pereira	Medellín
19:00 UTC−5		Report		Stadium: Atanasio Girardot; Referee: Vanessa Ceballos

18 May 2022	Santa Fe	4–0 (10–0 agg.)	Llaneros	Bogotá
20:00 UTC−5	Garavito 8' (pen.); García 25'; Romero 67'; Torres 79'	Report		Stadium: El Campín; Referee: Erika Sánchez

=== Semi-finals ===
Team 1	Agg.	Team 2	1st leg	2nd leg
Deportivo Pereira	0–2	América de Cali	0–0	0–2
Deportivo Cali	2–2 (4–2 p)	Santa Fe	1–1	1–1

==== First leg ====
22 May 2022	Deportivo Pereira	0–0	América de Cali	Pereira
13:00 UTC−5		Report		Stadium: Hernán Ramírez Villegas; Referee: Jenny Arias

22 May 2022	Deportivo Cali	1–1	Santa Fe	Palmira
15:00 UTC−5	L. Caicedo 41'	Report	Ramos 19'	Stadium: Deportivo Cali; Referee: Karen Lozano

==== Second leg ====
25 May 2022	América de Cali	2–0 (2–0 agg.)	Deportivo Pereira	Cali
20:00 UTC−5	Natis 1'; Usme 41'	Report		Stadium: Pascual Guerrero; Referee: Paula Fernández

26 May 2022	Santa Fe	1–1 (2–2 agg.) (2–4 p)	Deportivo Cali	Bogotá
20:00 UTC−5	Romero 31'	Report	Guerra 84'	Stadium: El Campín; Referee: Yeimi Martínez
	Penalties
	Huertas (penalty missed); García (penalty scored); Acosta (penalty scored); Romero (penalty missed)		(penalty scored) Arias; (penalty scored) Carabalí; (penalty scored) Guerra; (penalty scored) L. Caicedo

=== Finals ===
2 June 2022
20:00 UTC−5

Deportivo Cali	2–1	América de Cali
Ariza 3'; Carabalí 50'	Report	Yanten 53'

Estadio Deportivo Cali, Palmira
Referee: Luisa Fernanda Martínez

5 June 2022
17:05 UTC−5

América de Cali	3–1	Deportivo Cali
Usme 7', 71' (pen.); Vidal 35'	Report	L. Caicedo 46'

Estadio Pascual Guerrero, Cali
Attendance: 37,100
Referee: Erika Sánchez

América de Cali won 4–3 on aggregate.

Liga Femenina BetPlay DIMAYOR
2022 champions

2nd title

== Top scorers ==
Rank	Name	Club	Goals
1	(Colombia) Catalina Usme	América de Cali	15
2	(Colombia) Manuela González	Deportivo Cali	10
2	(Colombia) Kena Romero	Santa Fe	10
4	(Colombia) Ingrid Guerra	Deportivo Cali	9
5	(Colombia) Sindy Constante	Deportes Tolima	8
6	(Colombia) Nelly Córdoba	Santa Fe	7
6	(Colombia) Loren Sánchez	Atlético Huila	7
6	(Colombia) Ingrid Vidal	América de Cali	7
9	(Colombia) Sara Angulo	Cortuluá	6
9	(Colombia) Tatiana Ariza	Deportivo Cali	6
9	(Colombia) Wendy Bonilla	América de Cali	6
9	(Colombia) Leidy Chica	Deportivo Pereira	6
9	(Colombia) Sandra Ibargüen	Llaneros	6
9	(Colombia) Maryluz Montillo	Deportivo Pereira	6
9	(Colombia) Karen Urrutia	Orsomarso	6

Source: Soccerway

== See also ==
- Colombian Women's Football League
