= Daniela Caracas =

Colombian footballer (born 1997)

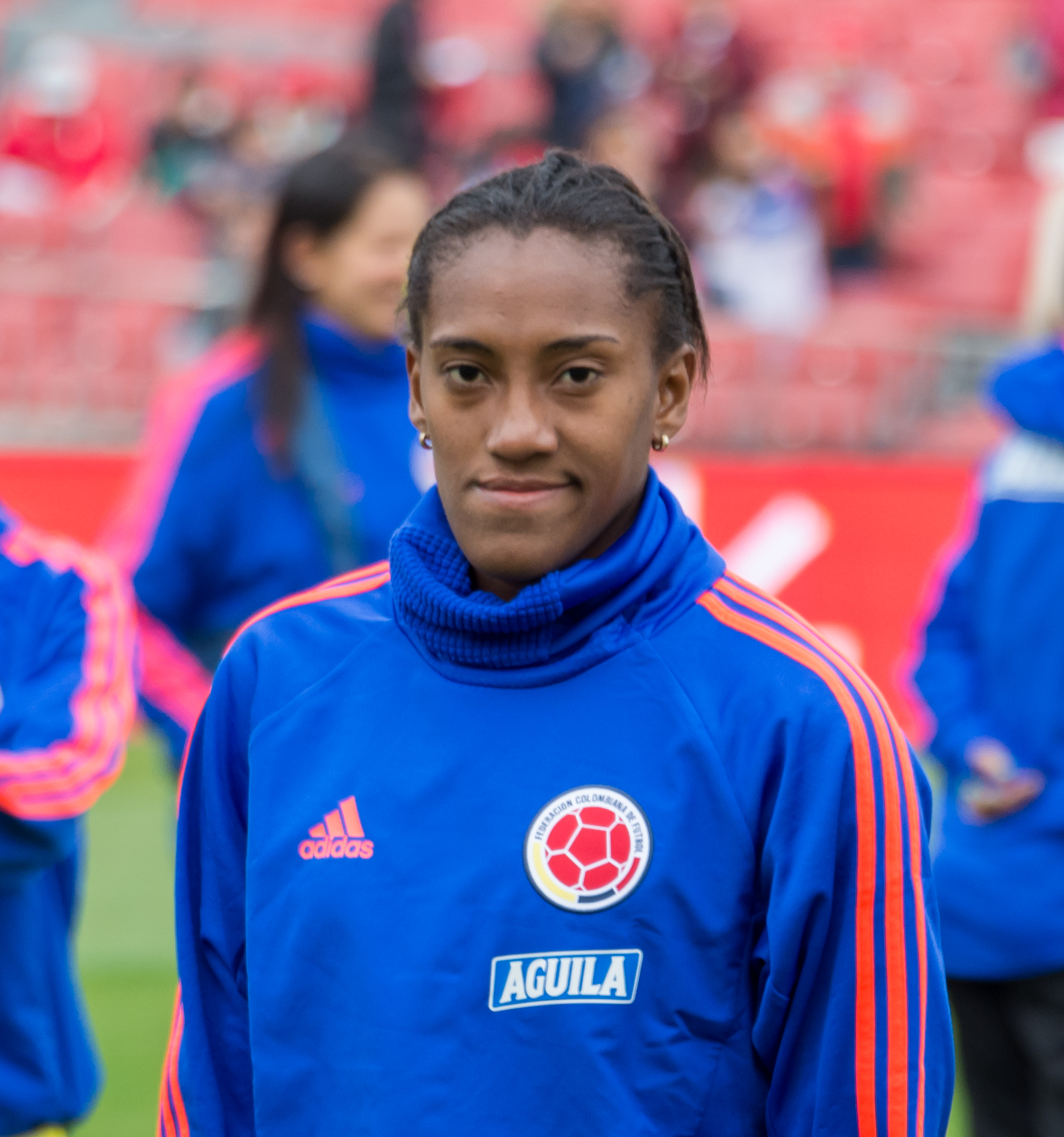
- Caracas with Colombia in 2019

Personal information
- Full name: Daniela Caracas González
- Date of birth: 25 April 1997 (age 29)
- Place of birth: Jamundí, Colombia
- Height: 1.66 m (5 ft 5 in)
- Position: Centre-back

Team information
- Current team: Deportivo de A Coruña

Senior career*
Years	Team	Apps	(Gls)
2017–2019	Atlético Huila		
2020–2021	EdF Logroño	32	(0)
2021–2026	Espanyol	54	(2)
2026–	Deportivo de A Coruña		

International career^{‡}
2018–	Colombia	22	(0)
Medal record
Women's football
Representing Colombia
Copa América Femenina
Runner-up	2022 Colombia
Runner-up	2025 Ecuador
Pan American Games
Gold medal – first place	2019 Lima	Team
- * Club domestic league appearances and goals as of 6 September 2024 ‡ National team caps and goals as of 18 July 2023

Daniela Caracas González (born 25 April 1997) is a Colombian professional footballer who plays as a centre-back for Liga F club Deportivo de A Coruña and the Colombia national team.

Caracas began her senior career with Atlético Huila, starting in the finals as the club won both the Colombian Women's Football League and the Copa Libertadores Femenina in 2018, the first continental title for a Colombian women's club. She moved to Spain in 2020, played two seasons for EdF Logroño and then spent five seasons with Espanyol, where she was part of the side that returned from the second tier to Liga F in 2024. She joined Deportivo de A Coruña in 2026.

At international level Caracas won gold at the 2019 Pan American Games and was a member of the Colombia squads that finished runners-up at the 2022 and 2025 Copa América Femenina. She was selected for the 2023 FIFA Women's World Cup, where Colombia reached the quarter-finals for the first time, and played at the 2024 Summer Olympics.

== Early life ==
Caracas was born on 25 April 1997 in Jamundí, a municipality in Valle del Cauca about 30 minutes from Cali. She began playing football in her neighbourhood, went on to represent the Valle del Cauca regional selection and played for Atlas CP before joining Atlético Huila.

== Club career ==
=== Atlético Huila ===
Caracas won the first major honours of her career with Atlético Huila in 2018. She started in the final of the 2018 Colombian Women's Football League, in which Huila beat Atlético Nacional to win the national title. On 2 December 2018, aged 21, she started on the left of Huila's back four in the final of the Copa Libertadores Femenina against Brazil's Santos in Manaus. The match finished 1–1, and Huila won the shootout 5–3 to become the first Colombian club to win the competition.

=== Logroño ===
In 2020, at the age of 23, Caracas moved to Spain to join EdF Logroño, now known as Logroño United. She spent two seasons with the club and made 27 appearances in her final campaign there before leaving in the summer of 2021.

=== Espanyol ===
Espanyol announced Caracas's signing on 15 July 2021 on a contract until 2022, presenting her as a central defender with senior and youth international experience and a Copa Libertadores title. She arrived shortly after the club had been relegated from the top flight, and spent three seasons in the second tier before Espanyol secured promotion back to Liga F in May 2024. She stayed on for the return to the top division, with her contract extended to 2026.

On 9 February 2025, during a Liga F derby against Barcelona, Barcelona defender Mapi León was accused of touching Caracas's groin while the two contested a set piece in the 15th minute. Espanyol said the act had violated Caracas's privacy, and the club's head of women's football, Dolors Ribalta, called it "unacceptable" and "inadmissible". Ribalta also said Caracas had found the day difficult and felt overwhelmed. León denied wrongdoing, saying she had brushed Caracas's leg and had never intended to violate her privacy. Espanyol's captain Carol Marín and head coach Sara Monforte publicly backed Caracas, and the club's captains said they hoped "for the good of women's football" that such an incident would not happen again. Espanyol also said Caracas had received hundreds of abusive messages on social media. In April 2025 the disciplinary committee of the Royal Spanish Football Federation banned León for two matches for unsporting conduct under article 129 of its disciplinary code. Spain's administrative sports tribunal rejected Barcelona's request to suspend the ban while an appeal was heard.

In her last season with Espanyol, 2025–26, Caracas made 24 Liga F appearances, 22 of them as a starter. She left when her contract expired, after five seasons at the club.

=== Deportivo de A Coruña ===
On 2 July 2026, Caracas joined Deportivo de A Coruña on a free transfer, signing a contract until June 2028.

== International career ==
=== Youth ===
Caracas won a gold medal with Colombia's under-20 side at the 2017 Bolivarian Games in Santa Marta.

=== Senior ===
Caracas was named in Colombia's squad for the 2018 Copa América Femenina in Chile, her first senior tournament. She was part of the squad that won the women's tournament at the 2019 Pan American Games in Lima. In the final at the Estadio Universidad San Marcos on 10 August 2019, Colombia drew 1–1 with Argentina and won the shootout 7–6, the country's first Pan American gold in women's football.

On 3 July 2022, Caracas was named to Colombia's squad for the 2022 Copa América Femenina, held in Colombia. She and Liana Salazar were the two members of Huila's 2018 Libertadores-winning side in the squad. Before the opening match against Paraguay, the Colombian players raised their arms during the national anthem in protest at unequal prize money and the suspension of the domestic league. Colombia reached the final in Bucaramanga and lost 1–0 to Brazil to a 39th-minute penalty by Debinha.

On 4 July 2023, Caracas was named to Colombia's squad for the 2023 FIFA Women's World Cup. On 14 July, a warm-up match against the Republic of Ireland in Brisbane was abandoned after about 20 minutes, when Ireland withdrew following a tackle that sent Denise O'Sullivan to hospital. Ireland manager Vera Pauw said her players had "feared for their bodies". Irish journalists had also been refused entry to the match despite an agreement that they could attend. Filmed while signing autographs for Colombian supporters outside the ground, Caracas called the Ireland players nenas ("little girls") for complaining about a foul, and added que coman mierda ("let them eat shit"). Pauw said she was "a bit shocked" by the remarks but suggested the Colombian players "maybe were emotional too". The Colombian federation said it respected fair play and Ireland's decision to withdraw. At the tournament, Colombia beat Jamaica 1–0 in the round of 16 to reach the quarter-finals of a Women's World Cup for the first time.

On 5 July 2024, Caracas was named to Colombia's squad for the 2024 Summer Olympics in Paris. After a 3–2 defeat to France, a 2–0 win over New Zealand and a 1–0 loss to Canada, Colombia reached the Olympic quarter-finals for the first time. Wearing the number 4 shirt, Caracas played in the quarter-final against Spain at the Stade de Lyon on 3 August. The match ended 2–2 after extra time, and Spain won the shootout 4–2.

At the 2025 Copa América Femenina in Ecuador, Caracas was in Colombia's squad for the semi-final against Argentina in Quito on 29 July 2025, which Colombia won 5–4 on penalties after a goalless draw. She started the final against Brazil at the Estadio Rodrigo Paz Delgado on 2 August. The match finished 4–4 after extra time, and Brazil won the shootout 5–4, leaving Colombia runners-up for the second tournament in a row.

== Style of play ==
Caracas is mainly a centre-back but has also played at right-back for Colombia, including in friendlies against Nigeria and Mexico in 2023. Before Colombia's group match against Germany at the 2023 World Cup, El Tiempo reported that coach Nelson Abadía had worked with her at right-back in training because of her height advantage over Carolina Arias. Arias kept the position for the 2–1 win. Vavel described her as a forceful defender who stands out for her intensity in one-on-one duels, her reading of the game and her organisation of the back line, and cited her six yellow cards in the 2025–26 Liga F season as a sign of that intensity. El Español described her game as aggressive and disciplined.

== Honours ==
Atlético Huila

- Colombian Women's Football League: 2018
- Copa Libertadores Femenina: 2018

Colombia U20

- Bolivarian Games gold medal: 2017

Colombia

- Pan American Games gold medal: 2019
- Copa América Femenina runner-up: 2022, 2025
