= 2012 South American U-20 Women's Championship =

2012 South American Under-20 Women Championship
Tournament details
- Host country: Brazil
- Dates: 20 January – 5 February
- Teams: 10 (from 1 confederation)
- Venues: 3 (in 3 host cities)

Final positions
- Champions: Brazil (5th title)
- Runners-up: Argentina
- Third place: Colombia
- Fourth place: Paraguay

Tournament statistics
- Matches played: 26
- Goals scored: 87 (3.35 per match)
- Top scorer: (Brazil) Ketlen (9)

The 2012 South American Under-20 Women's Football Championship was the 5th edition of the South American Under-20 Women Championship. It was held from 20 January to 5 February in Brazil. The winners, and the runners-up, were qualified for the 2012 FIFA U-20 Women's World Cup held in Japan.

== Participating teams ==
- Argentina
- Bolivia
- Brazil (Hosts)
- Chile
- Colombia
- Ecuador
- Paraguay
- Peru
- Uruguay
- Venezuela

== First stage ==
Matches were played in Curitiba, Paranaguá and Ponta Grossa.

Key to colours in group tables
Top 2 teams in each group advanced to the second stage

=== Group A ===
Team	Pld	W	D	L	GF	GA	GD	Pts
Brazil	4	4	0	0	16	1	+15	12
Paraguay	4	2	1	1	6	3	+3	7
Uruguay	4	2	0	2	5	12	−7	6
Bolivia	4	0	2	2	2	4	−2	2
Peru	4	0	1	3	1	9	−8	1

20 January 2012
18:00 UTC-3

Uruguay	2–1	Peru
Martirena 18'; Pion 82'		Ugarte 50'

Estadio Vila Capanema, Curitiba
20 January 2012
20:10 UTC-3

Brazil	2–0	Paraguay
Thais 12', 57'

Estadio Vila Capanema, Curitiba

22 January 2012
16:00 UTC-3

Paraguay	3–1	Uruguay
Cuevas 12', 44'; Gauto 88'		Birizamberri 46'

Estadio Vila Capanema, Curitiba
22 January 2012
18:10 UTC-3

Bolivia	0–0	Peru

Estadio Vila Capanema, Curitiba

24 January 2012
18:00 UTC-3

Uruguay	2–1	Bolivia
Birizamberri 68'; Yun 75'		Zenteno 86'

Estadio Germano Kruger, Ponta Grossa
24 January 2012
20:10 UTC-3

Peru	0–6	Brazil
		Glaucia 13', 62'; Thais 50'; Ketlen 77', 79'; Beatriz 9', 74'

Estadio Germano Kruger, Ponta Grossa

26 January 2012
18:00 UTC-3

Paraguay	0–0	Bolivia

Estadio Vila Capanema, Curitiba
26 January 2012
20:10 UTC-3

Brazil	7–0	Uruguay
Beatriz 9', 74'; Andressa 34'; Ketlen 47', 62'; Glaucia 54'; Paula 81'

Estadio Vila Capanema, Curitiba

28 January 2012
16:00 UTC-3

Peru	0–3	Paraguay
		Fleitas 31'; Leguizamón 37', 44'

Estadio Caranguejão, Paranaguá
28 January 2012
18:10 UTC-3

Bolivia	1–2	Brazil
Flórez 11'		Ketlen 32', 37'

Estadio Caranguejão, Paranaguá

=== Group B ===
Team	Pld	W	D	L	GF	GA	GD	Pts
Argentina	4	3	0	1	10	6	+4	9
Colombia	4	3	0	1	7	3	+4	9
Chile	4	2	0	2	9	5	+4	6
Ecuador	4	1	0	3	6	11	−5	3
Venezuela	4	1	0	3	4	10	−6	3

21 January 2012
16:00 UTC-3

Ecuador	3–2	Venezuela
Tipan 44'; Moreira 57'; Barré 70'		Altuve 4'; Viso 11'

Estadio Caranguejão, Paranaguá
21 January 2012
18:10 UTC-3

Argentina	0–1	Colombia
		Sierra 83'

Estadio Caranguejão, Paranaguá

23 January 2012
18:00 UTC-3

Colombia	2–0	Ecuador
Sierra 16'; Salazar 40'

Estadio Vila Capanema, Curitiba
23 January 2012
20:10 UTC-3

Chile	4–0	Venezuela
Huenteo 44'; Aedo 45'; Zepeda 51', 79'

Estadio Vila Capanema, Curitiba

25 January 2012
18:00 UTC-3

Ecuador	1–3	Chile
Moreira 53'		Zepeda 32'; Aedo 51'; Santibáñez 81'

Estadio Vila Capanema, Curitiba
25 January 2012
20:10 UTC-3

Venezuela	1–3	Argentina
Zambrano 9'		Bonsegundo 30'; Soriano 39', 64'

Estadio Vila Capanema, Curitiba

27 January 2012
18:00 UTC-3

Colombia	1–0	Chile
Pereira 35'

Estadio Vila Capanema, Curitiba
27 January 2012
20:10 UTC-3

Argentina	4–2	Ecuador
Bonsegundo 10', 27', 35'; Tesuari 89'		Olvera 41'; Moreira 50'

Estadio Vila Capanema, Curitiba

29 January 2012
16:00 UTC-3

Venezuela	1–0	Colombia
Abraham 32'

Estadio Vila Capanema, Curitiba
29 January 2012
20:10 UTC-3

Chile	2–3	Argentina
Huenteo 27'; Pino 66'		Soriano 3', 46'; Espíndola 90+5'

Estadio Vila Capanema, Curitiba

== Final stage ==
The winner and the runner-up teams qualify for the 2012 FIFA U-20 Women's World Cup in Japan.

Team	Pld	W	D	L	GF	GA	GD	Pts
Brazil	3	3	0	0	11	0	+11	9
Argentina	3	1	1	1	5	5	0	4
Colombia	3	1	0	2	3	5	−2	3
Paraguay	3	0	1	2	3	12	−9	1

1 February 2012
18:00 UTC-3

Argentina	2–2	Paraguay
Oviedo 32'; Iribarne 73'		Fleitas 20'; Larrea 48'

Estadio Germano Kruger, Ponta Grossa
1 February 2012
20:10 UTC-3

Brazil	1–0	Colombia
Thaisinha 30'

Estadio Germano Kruger, Ponta Grossa

3 February 2012
18:00 UTC-3

Argentina	3–1	Colombia
Espíndola 7'; Soriano 17', 71'		Rincón 14' (pen.)

Estadio Durival Britto e Silva (Vila Capanema), Curitiba
3 February 2012
20:10 UTC-3

Brazil	8–0	Paraguay
Thaisinha 10'; Ketlen 27', 42'; Glaucia 37'; Tayla 53'; Lucimara 67', 90+2'

Estadio Durival Britto e Silva (Vila Capanema), Curitiba

5 February 2012
16:00 UTC-3

Paraguay	1–2	Colombia
Noelia Cuevas 59'	Report	Maria Gonzales 42'; Rincón 72'

Estadio Couto Pereira, Curitiba
5 February 2012
18:10 UTC-3

Brazil	2–0	Argentina
Ketlen 52'; Thaisinha 71' (pen.)	Report

Estadio Couto Pereira, Curitiba

2012 Women's Under-20 South American champions

Brazil
Fifth title

== Top goalscorers ==
players with at least three goals

9 goals

- (Brazil) Ketlen

7 goals

- (Brazil) Thaisinha

6 goals

- (Argentina) Betina Soriano

4 goals

- (Argentina) Florencia Bonsegundo

3 goals

- (Brazil) Beatriz
- (Brazil) Gláucia
- (Chile) Jetzabeth
- (Paraguay) Cuevas
