= Karla Torres =

Karla Torres may refer to:

- Karla Torres (footballer, born 1992), Venezuelan footballer
- Karla Torres (footballer, born 2006), Colombian footballer
