= Ana Fleitas =

Paraguayan footballer (born 1992)

Personal information
- Full name: Ana Lucía Fleitas Martínez
- Date of birth: 8 August 1992 (age 34)
- Height: 1.62 m (5 ft 4 in)
- Position: Midfielder

Team information
- Current team: Cerro Porteño
- Number: 10

Senior career*
Years	Team	Apps	(Gls)
2008–	Cerro Porteño		

International career
2008	Paraguay U17	3	(0)
2010–2012	Paraguay U20	?	(8)
	Paraguay	2+	(1+)
- * Club domestic league appearances and goals

Ana Lucía Fleitas Martínez (born 8 August 1992) is a Paraguayan footballer who plays as a midfielder for Cerro Porteño. She was a member of the Paraguay women's national team and also played for the national under-17 and under-20 squads.

== International career ==
Fleitas represented Paraguay at the 2008 FIFA U-17 Women's World Cup and two South American U-20 Women's Championship editions (2010 and 2012). At senior level, she capped during the 2010 South American Women's Football Championship. She also played the 2014 Copa América Femenina.

=== International goals ===
Scores and results list Paraguay's goal tally first

No.	Date	Venue	Opponent	Score	Result	Competition
1	14 September 2014	Estadio Bellavista, Ambato, Ecuador	Brazil	1–0	1–4	2014 Copa América Femenina
