= 2017 Colombian Women's Football League =

Liga Águila Femenina
- Season: 2017
- Champions: Santa Fe (1st title)
- Copa Libertadores Femenina: Santa Fe
- Matches: 104
- Goals: 323 (3.11 per match)
- Top goalscorer: Manuela González (13 goals)
- Biggest home win: Envigado 8–0 Real Santander (4 March 2017)
- Biggest away win: Alianza Petrolera 1–9 Envigado (1 March 2017)
- Highest scoring: Alianza Petrolera 1–9 Envigado (1 March 2017)
- Highest attendance: 33,327; Santa Fe v Atlético Huila

The 2017 Colombian Women's Football League season (officially known as the 2017 Liga Águila Femenina season for sponsorship reasons) was the first season of Colombia's top-flight women's football league. The season started on 17 February and concluded on 24 June 2017.

The two-legged final was played between Atlético Huila and Santa Fe. Santa Fe were the champions after beating Atlético Huila 2–1 in the first leg and 1–0 in the second leg for a 3–1 win on aggregate score, and qualified for the 2017 Copa Libertadores Femenina.

== Format ==
The 18 teams competed in three round-robin regional hexagonals. The top two teams in each hexagonal along with the two best third-placed teams moved on to the quarterfinals, with the winners advancing to the semifinals. The winners of each semifinal played the finals, which determined the first champions of the Women's League. All rounds in the knockout stage were played on a home-and-away basis.

== Teams ==
18 teams took part in the competition. The teams are affiliated with DIMAYOR affiliate clubs.

=== Stadia and locations ===
Locations of the 2017 Liga Águila Femenina teams

Hexagonal	Team	City	Stadium
A	Alianza Petrolera	Barrancabermeja	Daniel Villa Zapata
A	Atlético Bucaramanga	Bucaramanga	Cancha Marte
A	Envigado	Envigado	Polideportivo Sur
A	Real Cartagena	Cartagena	Jaime Morón León
A	Real Santander	Floridablanca	Álvaro Gómez Hurtado
A	Unión Magdalena	Santa Marta^{a}	Julia Turbay Samur
B	Atlético Huila	Neiva	Guillermo Plazas Alcid
B	Cúcuta Deportivo	Cúcuta^{b}	Municipal Héctor 'El Zipa' González
B	Fortaleza	Bogotá^{b}	Municipal Héctor 'El Zipa' González
B	La Equidad	Bogotá	Metropolitano de Techo
B	Patriotas	Tunja	La Independencia
B	Santa Fe	Bogotá	Nemesio Camacho
C	América de Cali	Cali	Pascual Guerrero
C	Cortuluá	Tuluá^{c}	Pascual Guerrero
C	Deportes Quindío	Armenia	Centenario
C	Deportivo Pasto	Pasto	Departamental Libertad
C	Deportivo Pereira	Pereira	Hernán Ramírez Villegas
C	Orsomarso	Palmira	Francisco Rivera Escobar

a: Played home games at El Carmen de Bolívar.
b: Played home games at Zipaquirá.
c: Played home games at Cali.

== First stage ==
The First stage began on 17 February and consisted of three round-robin hexagonals.

=== Group A ===
Pos	Team	Pld	W	D	L	GF	GA	GD	Pts	Qualification	ENV	BUC	RCA	MAG	RSA	APE
1	Envigado	10	10	0	0	36	3	+33	30	Advanced to the knockout phase	—	2–0	4–0	3–1	8–0	3–0
2	Atlético Bucaramanga	10	6	0	4	19	11	+8	18	Advanced to the knockout phase	0–1	—	2–1	1–0	4–0	4–0
3	Real Cartagena	10	5	1	4	14	12	+2	16		0–2	2–1	—	4–1	3–0	3–1
4	Unión Magdalena	10	5	1	4	13	14	−1	16		0–2	2–1	0–0	—	2–1	1–0
5	Real Santander	10	1	1	8	7	26	−19	4		1–2	1–2	1–0	0–1	—	1–1
6	Alianza Petrolera	10	1	1	8	10	33	−23	4		1–9	2–4	0–1	2–5	3–2	—

Source: Soccerway
Legend: Blue = home team win; Yellow = draw; Red = away team win.
Rules for classification: 1) Points, 2) Goal difference, 3) Goals for, 4) Away goals for, 5) Goals against, 6) Drawing of lots

=== Group B ===
Pos	Team	Pld	W	D	L	GF	GA	GD	Pts	Qualification	SFE	CUC	HUI	PAT	FOR	EQU
1	Santa Fe	10	10	0	0	32	5	+27	30	Advanced to the knockout phase	—	3–1	6–0	4–1	1–0	5–2
2	Cúcuta Deportivo	10	6	0	4	22	16	+6	18	Advanced to the knockout phase	0–2	—	2–1	0–2	4–0	4–0
3	Atlético Huila	10	5	2	3	21	13	+8	17	Advanced to the knockout phase	1–2	6–1	—	0–0	5–1	1–0
4	Patriotas	10	2	3	5	11	20	−9	9		0–4	1–4	1–1	—	1–2	3–2
5	Fortaleza	10	2	1	7	8	23	−15	7		0–2	1–4	0–3	2–2	—	2–0
6	La Equidad	10	2	0	8	6	23	−17	6		0–3	0–2	0–3	1–0	1–0	—

Source: Soccerway
Legend: Blue = home team win; Yellow = draw; Red = away team win.
Rules for classification: 1) Points, 2) Goal difference, 3) Goals for, 4) Away goals for, 5) Goals against, 6) Drawing of lots

=== Group C ===
Pos	Team	Pld	W	D	L	GF	GA	GD	Pts	Qualification	ORS	COR	AME	QUI	PER	PAS
1	Orsomarso	10	8	1	1	22	4	+18	25	Advanced to the knockout phase	—	1–0	2–0	2–0	1–2	4–1
2	Cortuluá	10	6	2	2	23	8	+15	20	Advanced to the knockout phase	0–1	—	1–1	3–1	4–0	7–0
3	América de Cali	10	5	4	1	24	9	+15	19	Advanced to the knockout phase	0–0	2–2	—	5–0	5–0	3–0
4	Deportes Quindío	10	2	1	7	8	19	−11	7		0–1	0–1	2–2	—	2–1	1–2
5	Deportivo Pereira	10	2	1	7	10	27	−17	7		1–5	1–3	2–4	1–2	—	1–0
6	Deportivo Pasto	10	2	1	7	6	26	−20	7		0–5	1–2	0–2	1–0	1–1	—

Source: Soccerway
Legend: Blue = home team win; Yellow = draw; Red = away team win.
Rules for classification: 1) Points, 2) Goal difference, 3) Goals for, 4) Away goals for, 5) Goals against, 6) Drawing of lots

=== Ranking of third-placed teams ===
The two best teams among those ranked third qualified for the knockout stage.

Pos	Grp	Team	Pld	W	D	L	GF	GA	GD	Pts	Result
1	C	América de Cali	10	5	4	1	24	9	+15	19	Advanced to the knockout phase
2	B	Atlético Huila	10	5	2	3	21	13	+8	17	Advanced to the knockout phase
3	A	Real Cartagena	10	5	1	4	14	12	+2	16	

Source: Soccerway
Rules for classification: 1) Points, 2) Goal difference, 3) Goals for, 4) Away goals for, 5) Goals against, 6) Drawing of lots

== Knockout phase bracket ==
Quarterfinals
1B	Santa Fe	2	1	3
1T	América de Cali	1	1	2
1C	Orsomarso	0	2	2
2A	Atlético Bucaramanga	2	1	3
2C	Cortuluá	1	2	3
2B	Cúcuta Deportivo	0	0	0
1A	Envigado	1	2	3 (2)
2T	Atlético Huila (p)	2	1	3 (3)

Semifinals
Santa Fe	1	3	4
Atlético Bucaramanga	0	0	0
Cortuluá	0	2	2 (1)
Atlético Huila (p)	2	0	2 (3)

Finals
Santa Fe	2	1	3
Atlético Huila	1	0	1

Liga Águila Femenina
2017 Champions
Santa Fe
1st Title

== Top goalscorers ==
Rank	Name	Club	Goals
1	(Colombia) Manuela González	Atlético Bucaramanga	13
2	(Venezuela) Oriana Altuve	Santa Fe	11
3	(Colombia) Daniela Montoya	Envigado	11
4	(Colombia) Catalina Usme	América de Cali	10
5	(Colombia) Karen Páez	Cúcuta Deportivo	10

Source: Futbolred

== See also ==
- Colombian Women's Football League
