= Association of Amateur Artists =

Theatrical troupe in Peru

- Asociación de Artistas Aficionados
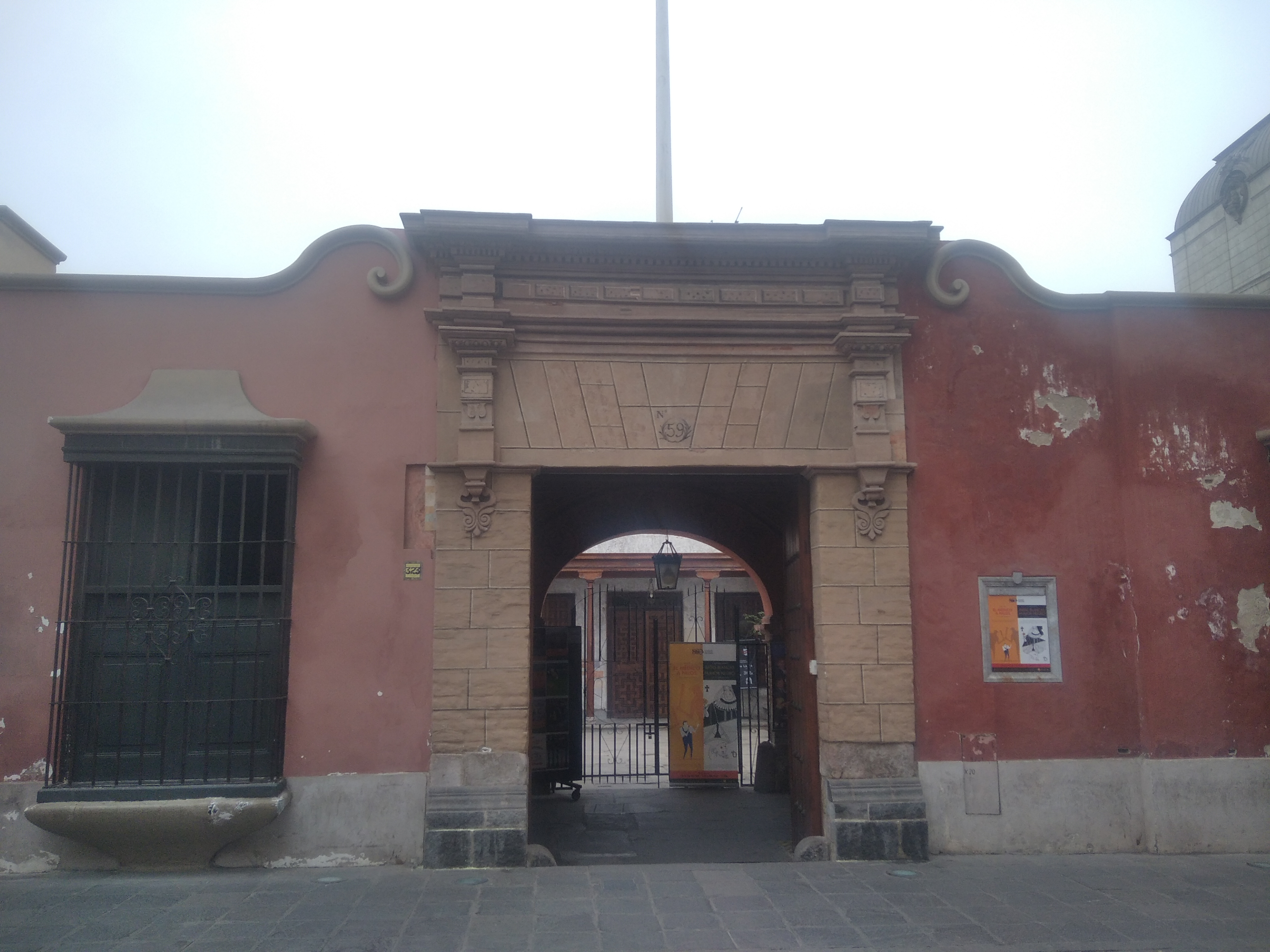
- Headquarters in Lima
- Abbreviation: AAA
- Established: June 13, 1938; 86 years ago
- Type: Cultural institution
- Headquarters: Jirón Ica 323, Lima, Peru
- Website: aaalima.pe

The Association of Amateur Artists (Spanish: Asociación de Artistas Aficionados) is a Peruvian theatre company and cultural institution founded on June 13, 1938. Its headquarters are located at Jirón Ica 323, and are part of the historic centre of Lima, Peru. The association was a pioneer in the dissemination of performing art in the country.

== History ==
The group was founded on June 13, 1938, by a group of young people, including the brothers Alejandro, Aurelio and Elvira Miró Quesada, Rosa Graña, Manuel Solari Swayne, Percy Gibson, Ricardo Grau, among others. Influenced by the arrival of Margarita Xirgu and the emergence of the autochthonous, she renewed contemporary artistic development. In addition, it fostered the cradle of talents in theater, dance and singing; even before the arrival of institutions dedicated to these skills under the concept of "cultural Tuesdays." Part of the cast managed to stage in other countries such as Spain and France. Among the best known is Enrique Solari Swayne's Collacocha, which was even exhibited at the Gran Teatro del Bosque, in Mexico.

== See also ==
- Teatro Municipal de Lima
- Teatro Segura
