= Liga de Fútbol Femenino (Panamá) =

Women's football competition

The Panamanian Women's First Division or the Women's Football League (LFF) is the top women's football competition in Panama. It is run by the Panamanian Football League and is contested in two annual tournaments called Apertura and Clausura.

== Beginnings ==
It was created in 2017 by the Panamanian Football Federation (FEPAFUT), with the aim of establishing a new league with the vision of being the highest competition of its kind that allows for continuous development in the different parts of the country and forms the best national teams.

The first edition of this competition was launched on June 24, 2017, with the participation of eight teams. The participants were SD Atlético Nacional, Chorrillo FC (from 2018 it changed its name to CD Universitario), San Francisco FC, El Brujas FC, Academia FMS, Sporting SM, Universidad Tecnológica UTP, and Azuero FC.

FEPAFUT regulated and organized the championship until 2020. Since 2021, it has been regulated by the Panamanian Football League, an independent entity of FEPAFUT and organizer of the top football competitions in the country.

Starting with the 2022 Opening Edition, the competition was expanded to 16 teams, with both the women's and men's tournaments officially having their respective representative teams in each category. In addition, highlighting the debut of three teams, Ciex Sports Academy, Herrera FC, and Élite FC, as well as the return of CD Árabe Unido to the top women's soccer tournament in Panama.

== Antecedents ==
The first steps in women's football in Panama were taken between 1939 and 1941 with the Catholic League played by girls' schools.

In the 1970s, there were teams such as El Chorrillo, Barraza, and Panama Viejo. Among the tournaments played, the Panamanian Air Force Cup (FAP) stands out in 1972. Likewise, from 1976 to 1980, the Panamanian Women's League was organized with the participation of teams such as Atlético Panamá, Santa Ana, Bethania, and Guardia Nacional.

The ball rolled again from 1991 to 1993 when the District League of Panama was held on the El Chimborazo field in Juan Díaz; at that time the Panama Viejo FC women's team was one of the best known.

In 1996, the Liga Superior de Fútbol Femenino (LSFF) was founded by young sports experts, and a year later the first championship was held, with the Venus de Santa Ana as the winner. The competition, which changed its name to Liga Femenina de Fútbol, lasted until 2002.

In response to the need to meet commitments in the field of national teams, the National Women's Football Association (ANAFUFE) was created, supported by FEPAFUT, and which lasted from 2003 to 2013, with its opening and closing championships being a sensation in its first years.

Among the participating teams were Club Deportivo Santa Ana, Navy Bay de Colón, Olympic SD, Chorrillo FC, and SD Atlético Nacional. Without forgetting the protagonists of the stature of Amarelis De Mera, Diana Valderrama, Lucrecia Bustamante, Mónica Franco, Raiza Gutiérrez, among others with notable participation

== Club Licensing ==
In accordance with the guidelines required by FIFA and CONCACAF, as of 2018 it was stipulated that the participating teams would be from professional clubs of the LPF and LNA.

In the second edition, 16 teams saw action: SD Atlético Nacional, CAI, SD Panama Oeste, Atlético Veragüense, Club Deportivo Universitario, San Francisco FC, Santa Gema FC, CD Plaza Amador, CD Centenario, Costa del Este FC, Colón C-3, Deportivo Árabe Unido, Tauro FC, Río Abajo FC, Sporting SM, and Lions of America.

== Participating teams 2022 ==
Below are the participating teams with their respective venues.

=== Teams by province ===
| Province | N.º | Teams |
|---|---|---|
| Panama | 7 | Alianza FC; CIEX Sports Academy; CD Plaza Amador; Potros del Este; SD Atlético Nacional; Sporting SM; Tauro FC |
| Panamá Oeste | 3 | CA Independiente; Élite FC; SD Panamá Oeste |
| Chiriquí | 2 | CD Atlético Chiriquí; Mario Mendez FC |
| Coclé | 1 | CD Universitario |
| Colón | 1 | CD Árabe Unido |
| Herrera | 1 | Herrera FC |
| Veraguas | 1 | Veraguas United FC |
| Total | 16 | |

| Name | Campus | Stadium | Capacity |
|---|---|---|---|
| Tauro FC | Panama City | Luis Ernesto Tapia | 720 |
| CD Universitario | Penonomé | Virgilio Tejeira | 3,500 |
| CAI La Chorrera | La Chorrera | Agustín Sánchez | 3,500 |
| CD Plaza Amador | Panama City | Maracaná | 5,500 |
| SD Panamá Oeste | La Chorrera | Agustín Sánchez | 3,500 |
| SD Atlético Nacional | Panama City | Maracaná | 5,500 |
| Veraguas United FC | Veraguas | Rafael Rodríguez | 350 |
| Potros del Este | Panama City | Maracaná | 5,500 |
| Mario Méndez FC | David | San Cristóbal | 3,500 |
| Sporting SM | San Miguelito | Los Andes II | 1,450 |
| Atlético Chiriquí | David | San Cristóbal | 3,500 |
| Élite F.C. | La Chorrera | Agustín Sánchez | 3,500 |
| Herrera FC | Chitré | Los Milagros | 1,000 |
| Deportivo Árabe Unido | Colón | Armando Dely Valdés | 4,000 |
| CIEX Academy | Panama City | Eagles Stadium | 300 |
| Alianza F.C. | Panama City | Luis Ernesto Tapia | 720 |

== Finals history ==
| Year | Edition | Champion | Result | Runner-up | Teams |
Liga de Fútbol Femenino
| 2017 | I | S.D. Atlético Nacional (1) | 4:2 | Chorrillo F.C. (1) | 8 |
| Ap. 2018 | II | C.D. Universitario (1) | 6:1 | S.D. Atlético Nacional (1) | 16 |
| Cl. 2019 | III | C.D. Universitario (2) | 6:2 | S.D. Atlético Nacional (2) | 16 |
| Ap. 2019 | IV | C.D. Universitario (3) | 3:2 | Tauro F.C.(1) | 16 |
| 2020 | V | S.D. Atlético Nacional (2) | 2:1 | Tauro F.C.(2) | 8 |
| Ap. 2021 | VI | Tauro F.C. (1) | 1:0 | C.D. Plaza Amador (1) | 12 |
| Cl. 2021 | VII | Tauro F.C. (2) | 2:1 | C.D. Plaza Amador (2) | 12 |
| 2022 | VIII | Tauro F.C. (3) | 2:0 | C.D. Plaza Amador (3) | 16 |
| Ap. 2023 | IX | Tauro F.C. (4) | 3:1 | Sporting SM (1) | 16 |
| Cl. 2023 | X | Cancelled | Cancelled | Cancelled | 10 |
| Ap. 2024 | XI | Santa Fe FC | 4:0 | CIEX Sports Academy | 10 |

== Superfinals ==
| Year | Edition | Champion | Result | Runner-up |
Liga de Fútbol Femenino
| 2020-21 | I | Tauro F.C. (1) | 4:1 | C.D. Universitario (1) |
| 2021-22 | II | (Panama) Tauro FC was crowned champion of the Clausura 2021 tournament and the 2022 tournament. |

== Titles by team ==
| Club | Titles | Subtitles | Champion years | Runner-up years |
|---|---|---|---|---|
| Tauro F. C. | 4 | 2 | (A)2021, (C)2021, 2022, 2023 | (A)2019, (C)2020 |
| C. D. Universitario | 3 | 0 | (A)2018, (C)2019, (A)2019 |
| S. D. Atlético Nacional | 2 | 2 | 2017, 2020 | (A)2018, (C)2019 |
| Santa Fe FC | 1 | 0 | (A)2024 |
| C. D. Plaza Amador | 0 | 3 | | (A)2021, (C)2021, 2022 |
| Chorrillo F. C. (Note: Nowadays known as Fútbol Club Chorrillo, after its return to football in 2022.) | 0 | 1 | | 2017 |
| CIEX Sports Academy | 0 | 1 | | (A)2024 |

== Titles by province ==
| Province | Titles | | Subtítles |
|---|---|---|---|---|
| Panama | 7 | Tauro F.C. (4), S.D. Atlético Nacional (2), Santa Fe F.C. (1) | 9 | C.D. Plaza Amador (3), S.D. Atlético Nacional (2), Tauro F.C. (2), Chorrillo F.C. (1), CIEX Sports Academy (1) |
| Coclé | 3 | C.D. Universitario (3) | 0 |

== See also ==
- Panamanian Football League
- Women's Football League Superfinal
