= Yoreli Rincón =

Colombian footballer (born 1993)

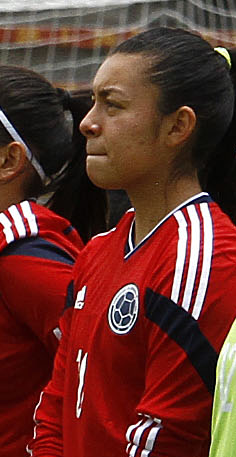
- Rincón with the Colombia national team in 2014

Personal information
- Full name: Hazleydi Yoreli Rincón Torres
- Date of birth: 27 July 1993 (age 33)
- Place of birth: Piedecuesta, Colombia
- Height: 1.68 m (5 ft 6 in)
- Position: Midfielder

Team information
- Current team: Santos
- Number: 70

Senior career*
Years	Team	Apps	(Gls)
2006–2008	Liga de Tolima		
2008–2010	Liga de Bogotá		
2011	Gol Star		
2012	XV de Piracicaba	9	(2)
2013	LdB FC Malmö	12	(1)
2014	New Jersey Wildcats	9	(6)
2015	Torres		
2015	Avaldsnes	10	(2)
2017	Patriotas		
2018	Atlético Huila		
2019	Iranduba	9	(0)
2019	Atlético Junior		
2019	→ Al-Riffa (loan)	0	(0)
2020–2021	Inter Milan	16	(0)
2021–2023	Sampdoria	37	(6)
2023–2024	Atlético Nacional		
2024–2025	Palmeiras	36	(3)
2026–	Santos	0	(0)

International career^{‡}
2008	Colombia U17		
2010–2012	Colombia U20	8+	(4)
2010–2018	Colombia	51	(14)
- * Club domestic league appearances and goals as of 21:21, 14 January 2026 (UTC) ‡ National team caps and goals as of 16:13, 19 January 2026 (UTC)

Hazleydi Yoreli Rincón Torres (born 27 July 1993) is a Colombian professional footballer who plays as a midfielder for Brazilian club Santos.

Rincón previously played professional football for clubs in Brazil, Sweden and the United States. She debuted for the Colombia women's national football team in 2010 and was included in the national team for the 2012 London Olympics, as well as the FIFA Women's World Cup in 2011 and 2015.

== Club career ==
Born in Piedecuesta, Rincón began playing football in the Colombian league at age 12, winning the national league with Liga de fútbol de Tolima in 2007. She made a verbal commitment to join Indiana University to play collegiate soccer beginning in 2011, but backed out to embark on a professional career.

At age 18, Rincón signed a one-year contract with Campeonato Paulista de Futebol Feminino club XV de Piracicaba after being recommended by fellow Colombian footballer Freddy Rincón. In January 2013, she moved to Swedish Damallsvenskan team LdB FC Malmö, where she started two of 12 appearances in 2013 and scored once, against Piteå IF, as the club recaptured their league title. After that first season Rincón was released by Malmö, for economic reasons.

Rincón was invited to Western New York Flash's preseason training camp in March 2014, but joined New Jersey Wildcats of the W-League for the 2014 season. She intended to gain experience, adapt to the American style of soccer and ultimately win a move to the National Women's Soccer League (NWSL).

On 25 December 2014, Rincón switched teams and countries again, after signing for Torres in Italy. On 4 July of the following year, she moved to Avaldsnes in Norway, but was unable to establish herself as a regular starter and left in December.

On 30 August 2016, Rincón signed a three-year deal with Patriotas to play for the club ahead of the 2017 season. On 30 September 2017, she joined Atlético Huila, and helped the club to win the 2018 Copa Libertadores Femenina.

On 2 January 2019, Rincón returned to Brazil after signing for Iranduba. She returned to her home country with Atlético Junior in July, but moved to Bahraini club Riffa SC on 27 September, to play in the 2019 WAFF Women's Clubs Championship.

On 31 January 2020, Rincón returned to Italy and agreed to a deal with Inter Milan. Sparingly used, she moved to fellow league team Sampdoria in July 2021.

On 21 July 2023, Rincón returned to her home country again and joined Atlético Nacional. On 7 August 2024, she moved back to Brazil and signed for Palmeiras.

On 13 January 2026, Rincón was announced at Santos on a two-year contract.

== International career ==
Rincón has played as a midfielder for the Colombia national team, scoring five goals as Colombia finished as runners-up in the 2010 Sudamericano Femenino and helping her team qualify for its first ever FIFA Women's World Cup finals. She also played for Colombia at the 2008 FIFA U-17 Women's World Cup and 2010 FIFA U-20 Women's World Cup finals.

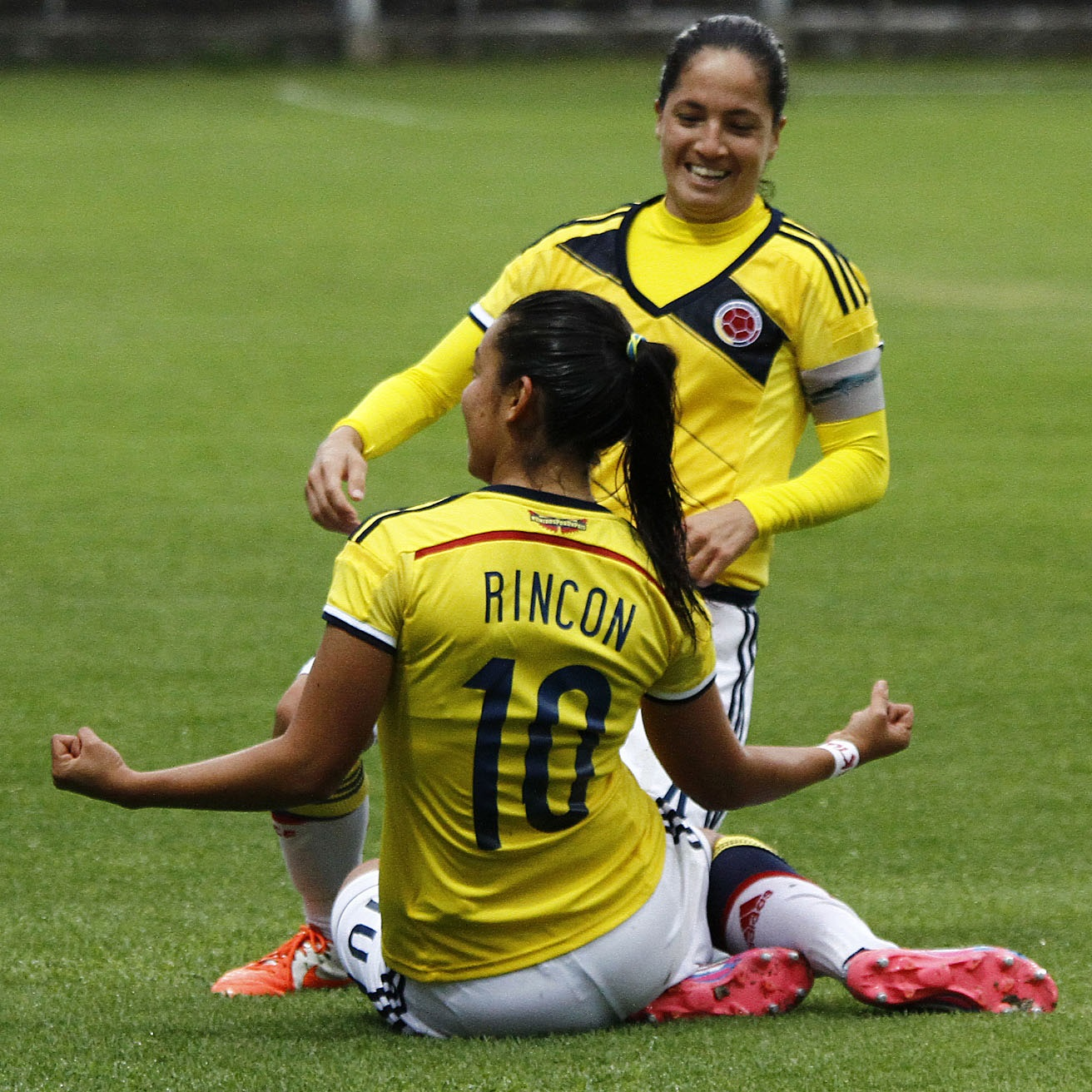
Rincón celebrating a goal for the Colombia national team in 2014

She was also named in the Colombian squad for the 2012 Olympics. Colombia were beaten in all three group matches as the team's coach controversially omitted Rincón, accusing her of arriving at the tournament in poor condition. She played at her second FIFA Women's World Cup in 2015. In July 2016, team captain Rincón, "widely considered Colombia's best player", broke her leg and was ruled out of the 2016 Olympics.

Rincón returned to the national team in 2018, playing in the Copa América Femenina, but after she complained about the conditions of women's footballers in Colombia, she was completely ostracized from the side.

== Personal life ==
Rincón is bisexual. She was in a relationship with a man called Alejandro González, but also dated Venezuelan female footballer Jaylis Oliveros.

== Career statistics ==
=== Club ===
As of 19 January 2026

Appearances and goals by club, season and competition
Club	Season	League			Cup (Note: Includes Svenska Cupen, Norwegian Women's Cup, Coppa Italia, Copa do Brasil de Futebol Feminino)		Continental		State league (Note: Includes Campeonato Paulista de Futebol Feminino)		Other		Total	
Club	Season	Division	Apps	Goals	Apps	Goals	Apps	Goals	Apps	Goals	Apps	Goals	Apps	Goals
XV de Piracicaba	2012	Paulista	—		—		—		9	2	—		9	2
LdB FC Malmö	2013	Damallsvenskan	12	1	1	2	5 (Note: Appearance(s) in UEFA Women's Champions League)	0	—		—		18	3
New Jersey Wildcats	2014	USL W-League	9	6	—		—		—		—		9	6
Avaldsnes	2015	Toppserien	10	2	4	1	—		—		—		14	3
Iranduba	2019	Série A1	9	0	—		—		—		—		9	0
Inter Milan	2019–20	Serie A	3	0	—		—		—		—		3	0
Inter Milan	2020–21	Serie A	16	0	2	0	—		—		—		18	0
Inter Milan	Total		19	0	2	0	—		—		—		21	0
Sampdoria	2021–22	Serie A	19	4	2	1	—		—		—		21	5
Sampdoria	2022–23	Serie A	18	2	1	0	—		—		—		19	2
Sampdoria	Total		37	6	3	1	—		—		—		40	7
Palmeiras	2024	Série A1	5	0	—		—		6	0	—		11	0
Palmeiras	2025	Série A1	15	1	2	0	—		10	2	—		27	3
Palmeiras	Total		20	1	2	0	—		16	2	—		38	3
Santos	2026	Série A1	0	0	0	0	—		0	0	—		0	0
Career total			116	16	12	4	5	0	25	4	0	0	158	24

=== International ===
As of 19 January 2026

National team	Year	Apps	Goals
Colombia	2010	8	6
Colombia	2011	8	2
Colombia	2012	3	0
Colombia	2014	12	4
Colombia	2015	8	1
Colombia	2016	2	0
Colombia	2017	1	0
Colombia	2018	10	1
Total		51	14

==== International goals ====
Scores and results list Colombia's goal tally first.

No	Date	Venue	Opponent	Score	Result	Competition
1.	20 September 2010	Metropolitano de Techo, Bogotá, Colombia	Chile	1–1	2–1	Friendly
2.	5 November 2010	Federativo Reina del Cisne, Loja, Ecuador	Paraguay	3–0	3–0	2010 South American Women's Football Championship
3.	9 November 2010	Jorge Andrade, Azogues, Ecuador	Venezuela	4–0	5–0	2010 South American Women's Football Championship
4.	13 November 2010	Alejandro Serrano Aguilar, Cuenca, Ecuador	Uruguay	2–0	8–0	2010 South American Women's Football Championship
5.	13 November 2010	Alejandro Serrano Aguilar, Cuenca, Ecuador	Uruguay	4–0	8–0	2010 South American Women's Football Championship
6.	17 November 2010	La Cocha, Latacunga, Ecuador	Chile	1–0	1–1	2010 South American Women's Football Championship
7.	22 April 2011	Villa Olímpica de Chía, Chía, Colombia	Mexico	2–3	2–3	Friendly
8.	20 October 2011	Estadio Akron, Zapopan, Mexico	Chile	1–0	1–0	2011 Pan American Games
9.	15 September 2014	Olímpico de Riobamba, Riobamba, Ecuador	Venezuela	1–0	4–1	2014 Copa América Femenina
10.	19 September 2014	La Cocha, Latacunga, Ecuador	Peru	1–0	1–0	2014 Copa América Femenina
11.	26 September 2014	Rumiñahui, Sangolquí, Ecuador	Ecuador	2–1	2–1	2014 Copa América Femenina
12.	21 November 2014	Unidad Deportiva Hugo Sánchez, Veracruz, Mexico	Trinidad and Tobago	7–0	7–0	2014 Central American and Caribbean Games
13.	17 March 2015	General Santander, Cúcuta, Colombia	Venezuela	1–0	3–0	Friendly
14.	4 April 2018	La Portada, La Serena, Chile	Uruguay	3–0	7–0	2018 Copa América Femenina

== Honours ==
Liga de Tolima

- Campeonato Nacional Femenino: 2007

LdB FC Malmö

- Damallsvenskan: 2013

Atlético Huila

- Colombian Women's Football League: 2018
- Copa Libertadores Femenina: 2018

Palmeiras

- Campeonato Paulista de Futebol Feminino: 2024, 2025
- Copa do Brasil de Futebol Feminino: 2025

Individual

- IFFHS CONMEBOL Women Team of the Decade 2011–2020
