= César Graña =

American sociologist and anthropologist

César Graña (1919, Peru – August 22, 1986, Spain) was an American sociologist and anthropologist of Peruvian origin.

Graña was born in Peru, a descendant of immigrants from Andalusia, and studied at the University of San Marcos in Lima. In 1942 he emigrated to the United States, where he studied at Brown, Duke, and the University of California (UC), from which he received his Ph.D. in 1957. He taught at the University of Puerto Rico, the University of Chicago College, the University of Illinois, UC Davis, UC Santa Cruz and, from 1972, UC San Diego.

Graña authored works on problems of national identity in Latin America, Nineteenth Century French bohemia, and works on the sociology of literature and art. His 1964 book Bohemian versus Bourgeois (also known as Modernity and its Discontents) is still considered an important work. His essay collection Fact and Symbol was nominated for a National Book Award.

Graña was married to Pauline Graña with whom he had two daughters. Later, he was married to Marigay Graña and had two sons. He died in a car accident on the highway between Seville and Cádiz.

== Works ==
- Graña, César (1964). Bohemian Versus Bourgeois: French Society and the French Man of Letters in the Nineteenth Century. New York: Basic Books. ISBN 978-0-465-00736-3. Paperback title: Modernity and its Discontents (1967, New York: Harper, Row)
- Graña, César (1967). Cultural Identity as an Intellectual Invention: Some Spanish-American Examples. Buenos Aires: Instituto Torcuato di Tella, Centro de Investigaciones Sociales.
- Graña, César (1972). Fact and Symbol: Essays in the Sociology of Art and Literature. New York: Oxford University Press. ISBN 978-0-19-501285-9.
- Graña, César (1994). Fact and Symbol: Essays in the Sociology of Art and Literature (revised ed.). New Brunswick, New Jersey: Transaction Publishers. ISBN 978-1-56000-605-3.
- Graña, César (1978). Cultural Nationalism: The Idea of Historical Destiny in Spanish America. Berkeley: Center for Latin American Studies, Institute of International Studies, University of California.
- Graña, César (1988). Meaning and Authenticity: Further Essays on the Sociology of Art. New Brunswick, New Jersey: Transaction Publishers. ISBN 978-0-88738-226-0.
- Graña, César; Graña, Marigay (1990). On Bohemia: The Code of the Self-Exiled. New Brunswick, New Jersey: Transaction Paperback. ISBN 0-88738-292-4.
