= Carolina Arbeláez =

Colombian footballer (born 1995)

Personal information
- Full name: Carolina Arbeláez Castaño
- Date of birth: March 8, 1995 (age 31)
- Place of birth: Rionegro, Colombia
- Height: 1.61 m (5 ft 3 in)
- Position: Full back

Team information
- Current team: Atlético Nacional
- Number: 21

Senior career*
Years	Team	Apps	(Gls)
2010–2016	Formas Íntimas		
2017	Envigado		
2018–2019	Atlético Nacional		
2019	Atlético Huila		
2020–2021	Deportivo La Coruña	14	(0)
2022	Carlos A. Mannucci		
2023	Independiente Medellín		
2023-	Atlético Nacional		

International career^{‡}
2012	Colombia U17		
2014	Colombia U20		
2014–2015	Colombia	1	(0)
- * Club domestic league appearances and goals as of 5 January 2021 ‡ National team caps and goals as of 23:08, 23 June 2015 (UTC)

Carolina Arbeláez Castaño (born 8 March 1995) is a Colombian footballer who plays as a full back for Atlético Nacional.

== Club career ==
After playing nine years in Colombia, on 23 December 2019, Arbeláez signed for Spanish Primera División club Deportivo La Coruña.

== International career ==
Arbeláez made her international debut in September 2014 when team Colombia took on Uruguay. Arbeláez was called up to play for team Colombia in the 2015 FIFA Women's World Cup in May 2015.
