= Grana (fashion company) =

Hong Kong online fashion company

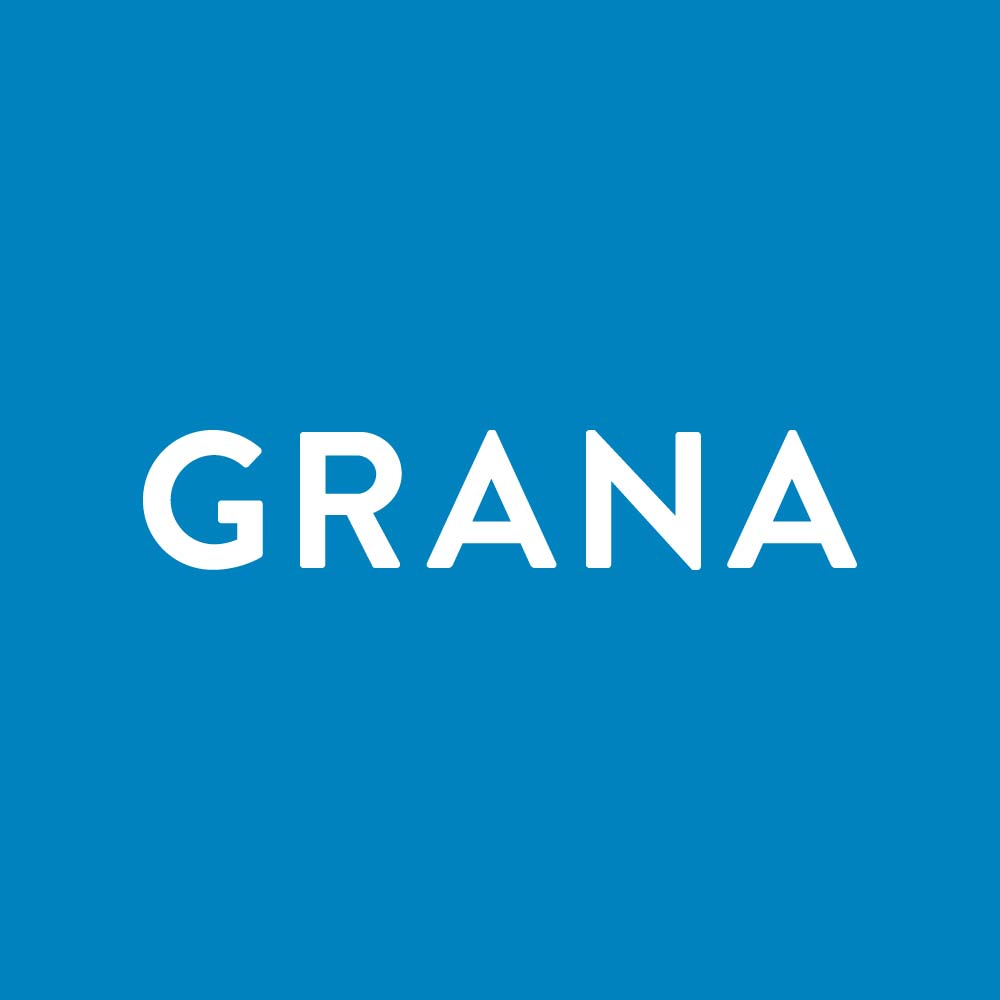
- Type: eCommerce
- Industry: Fashion Retail
- Founded: 1 October 2014; 11 years ago
- Headquarters: Hong Kong
- Area served: Worldwide
- Key people: Luke Grana (Founder & CEO)
- Products: Women's and Men's clothing
- Website: www.grana.com

Grana was an online fashion company based in Hong Kong. It had an offline showroom called “The Fitting Room” in Hong Kong, where customers could try on clothes and order online. It was cofounded by Luke Grana and Pieter-Paul Wittgen and officially launched in October 2014. The first brick-and-mortar store opened in Hong Kong in September 2015. As of 2026, the company's website and online store was no longer functioning and its social media platforms were not being updated. No announcement of formal closure was made.

== Products ==
The company sourced its products directly from fabric mills, which reduced markup prices. Grana clothing products included silks, linen, cashmere, merino, tencel, pima cotton and baby alpaca wools. The fabrics were sourced internationally from a variety of countries including China, France, Mongolia, Austria, Peru and Italy. Grana’s ‘new luxury’ brand focused its ethic on sustainable fashion setting itself apart from mass consumerism. Central to Grana’s business and production was ethical manufacturing.

== History ==
Grana’s CEO and founder, Luke Grana, set up the company as an online-only direct-to-consumer seller.

Prior to becoming CEO and namesake of Grana, he was a serial entrepreneur from Australia. He had previously invested in the catering industry among other areas, and seeded his first fashion brand, Grana, with $200,000 in 2014. Grana raised the initial seed round of US $1 million from Bluebell group and angel investors in October 2014, and in July 2015, closed another seed funding round of US $1.5 million involving investors from Singaporean VC Golden Gate Ventures. In 2016, Grana announced their Series A funding round of US $10 million led by Alibaba Group under The Hong Kong Entrepreneurs Fund, with participation from existing investors. By 2017, Grana had been the recipient of nine separate investments from various companies totaling $16 million.
