= Jaylis Oliveros =

Venezuelan footballer (born 1993)

Personal information
- Full name: Jaylis Carolina Oliveros Toledo
- Date of birth: 13 November 1993 (age 32)
- Place of birth: Calabozo, Venezuela
- Height: 1.62 m (5 ft 4 in)
- Position: Full back

Team information
- Current team: Atlético Huila
- Number: 19

Senior career*
Years	Team	Apps	(Gls)
2014–2015	Estudiantes de Guárico		
2016	Deportivo Anzoátegui		
2017–2018	Atlético Huila		
2019	Iranduba	9	(0)
2019–	Atlético Huila		

International career^{‡}
2014–	Venezuela	8	(0)
- * Club domestic league appearances and goals as of 17 July 2019 ‡ National team caps and goals as of 13 April 2018

Jaylis Carolina Oliveros Toledo (born 13 November 1993) is a Venezuelan professional footballer who plays as a full back for Colombian club Atlético Huila and the Venezuela women's national team.

== International career ==
Oliveros played for Venezuela at senior level in the 2014 Central American and Caribbean Games and the 2018 Copa América Femenina.

== Personal life ==
Oliveros has dated fellow female footballer Yoreli Rincón.
