= Betina Soriano =

Argentine footballer

Personal information
- Full name: Betina Fernanda Soriano
- Date of birth: 1 March 1994 (age 32)
- Place of birth: Córdoba, Argentina
- Height: 1.64 m (5 ft 5 in)
- Position: Forward

Team information
- Current team: Sporting San José

Youth career
- 200?–20??: Belgrano

Senior career*
Years	Team	Apps	(Gls)
20??–2015	Belgrano		
2019	Belgrano		
2019–2020	Talleres		
2021–	Sporting San José		

International career^{‡}
2012	Argentina U-20	6+	(6)
2011–	Argentina	2	(0)
Medal record
Women's football
Representing Argentina
Copa América Femenina
Bronze medal – third place	2025 Ecuador
- * Club domestic league appearances and goals ‡ National team caps and goals as of 27 August 2012.

Betina Fernanda Soriano (born 1 March 1994) is an Argentine policewoman and footballer who plays as a forward for Costa Rican club Sporting San José and the Argentina women's national team.

== Early life ==
Soriano was born in Córdoba.

== Club career ==
Soriano started playing football at 12, when she joined Belgrano. She has played in their first team until 2015. She then retired from football to focus on study and work. She was retired for three years and became a police officer during that time.

Soriano came back to football in early 2019 when she returned to Belgrano. Later that year, she moved to their rivals, Talleres. In early 2021, she signed for Sporting San José in Costa Rica.

== International career ==
Soriano represented Argentina at the 2012 South American U-20 Women's Championship and 2012 FIFA U-20 Women's World Cup. She capped at senior level during the 2011 Pan American Games.
