= Rosa Graña Garland =

Peruvian fashion designer and costumer

- Born: Rosa Angélica Graña Garland; 1 March 1909; Lima, Peru
- Died: 27 June 2003 (aged 94); Lima, Peru
- Other name: Mocha Graña
- Occupations: Fashion and costume designer
- Years active: 1938–2003

Rosa Graña Garland (1 March 1909 – 27 June 2003), known as Mocha Graña, was a Peruvian fashion designer and costumer. She designed wedding gowns, school uniforms and theatrical costumes. She was awarded Peru's second highest honor, Order of Merit for Distinguished Services on her ninetieth birthday.

== Early life ==
Rosa Angélica Graña Garland was born on 1 March 1909 in Lima, Peru, daughter of Enriqueta Garland and Francisco Graña Reyes. As a child, she cut her own hair, leaving her head bare, and earned the nickname "Mocha" (slang for head). Her father was a surgeon who had performed brain surgery in 1953 using an ancient Incan technique, and was at one time the president of the International College of Surgeons. She was one of seven siblings, which included Francisco Graña Garland, the editor of La Prensa, who was murdered in 1947.

Though mostly raised in Lima, the family traveled widely, and lived in exile for five years (1930–1935) in Panama after the coup d'état toppled President Augusto B. Leguía, under whose regime Francisco had served as vice president of the Peruvian Congress. After her time in Panama, Graña lived briefly in Spain before returning to Peru.

== Career ==
In 1938, Graña co-founded the Association of Amateur Artists, along with Elvira Miró Quesada and Corina Garland. Though she could not act, she participated in dancing and sang in the choir, and began to work behind the scenes, cleaning the theater and developing costumes for the performers. She particularly enjoyed ballet and encouraged Alicia Alonso, Dimitri Rostoff, and Oleg Tupine to come to Peru to perform, pressing for the formation of a Peruvian ballet. She also was a supporter and coordinator of Lima's Ancón Festival (Spanish: Festival de Ancón) and designed costumes for the 1969 Hispanoamerican Festival of Song and Dance held in Argentina, featuring the Peruvian musical ensemble Perú Negro. Both Graña and Negro were brought in to the Argentinian festival by Chabuca Granda, who had dedicated her waltz Señora y dueña to Graña in 1960.

Graña was self-taught in fashion design and opened a workshop in downtown Lima, focusing on bridal and evening wear. Graña developed her ideas by draping fabric on customers following their body lines. She never used patterns, and was a poor at drawing, but was able to communicate what she envisioned to her seamstresses. In the mid-1950s, she located her store, called Rose Bercis, in the Miraflores District, employing thirty seamstresses. She organized annual fashion shows at the Gran Hotel Bolivar, catering to her clients, like First Lady of Peru, Clorinda Málaga Bravo de Prado.

In 1967, the Peruvian government began to explore a mandatory school uniform, trying several different designs between 1967 and 1970. Graña was consulted and proposed a gray material for the girls' jumper or pinafore, with a single box-pleat in the center of the skirt front and straps which formed an H in the front and crossed in the back. Boys' trousers were the same gray and had no front folds or pleats, though elementary boys pants were knee-length, while upperclassmen wore ankle-length trousers. All uniforms included a white, short-sleeved, poplin shirt and were worn with gray socks, which for girls came to the knee. For winter attire, a gray sweater with a v-neck and long sleeves was added. She chose the fabrics based on their durability and colour fastness, though public sentiment did not always like the "rat gray" uniform. On 30 November 1970, the government made the standardized uniform mandatory for all students for the next thirty years.

In the 1970s, Graña was in charge of costuming for the Teatro Nacional Popular, as well as the National Ballet. In addition to advising the Museum of the Nation on Peruvian style and culture, she continued staging fashion shows, such as her One Hundred Years of Clothing in Peru, which she coordinated in 1999. That same year, Graña was awarded with the Order of Merit for Distinguished Services by Minister Fernando de Trazegnies Granda. In 2003, shortly before her death, she was honored by the Metropolitan Council of Lima for International Women's Day.

== Death and legacy ==
She died after being hospitalized at the Anglo American Clinic in Lima on 27 June 2003. In the Barranco District of Lima, the Teatro Mocha Graña was named in her honor.
