= Kena Romero =

Colombian footballer (born 1987)

Personal information
- Full name: Kena Marcela Romero Soto
- Date of birth: October 31, 1987 (age 39)
- Height: 1.66 m (5 ft 5 in)
- Position: Forward

Team information
- Current team: Atlético Huila

Senior career*
Years	Team	Apps	(Gls)
- Futuras Estrellas
- Atlético Huila

International career^{‡}
2011	Colombia	4	(0)
- * Club domestic league appearances and goals as of 13 June 2015 ‡ National team caps and goals as of 23:08, 23 June 2015 (UTC)

Kena Marcela Romero Soto (born 31 October 1987) is a Colombian footballer who plays as a forward for Millonarios FC. She was a member of the Colombia women's national team.

== International career ==
Romero played for Colombia at senior level in the 2011 Pan American Games.
