= Alanna (footballer) =

Brazilian footballer (born 1990)

Personal information
- Full name: Alanna Larissa Santana de Carvalho
- Date of birth: 10 March 1990 (age 36)
- Place of birth: Salvador, Brazil
- Height: 1.65 m (5 ft 5 in)
- Position: Attacking midfielder

Team information
- Current team: Fortaleza

Senior career*
Years	Team	Apps	(Gls)
2007–2010	São Francisco		
2010	Ferroviária		
2011	Duque de Caxias		
2012–2013	São José-SP	8	(3)
2014	Kindermann		
2014	São Francisco	4	(5)
2015–2016	São José-SP	12	(2)
2017	Corinthians	5	(2)
2018–2021	Santos	34	(12)
2022	3B da Amazônia	8	(3)
2023–	Fortaleza	2	(1)

International career
2010	Brazil U20		(7)
- * Club domestic league appearances and goals as of 19:10, 13 May 2023 (UTC)

Alanna Larissa Santana de Carvalho (born 10 March 1990), simply known as Alanna, is a Brazilian footballer who plays as an attacking midfielder for Fortaleza.

== Club career ==
Born in Salvador, Bahia, Alanna began her career at the local side of São Francisco. In 2010, after impressing with the under-20 national team, she moved to Ferroviária.

Alanna subsequently played for Duque de Caxias, São José-SP and Kindermann before returning to São Francisco in 2014. She returned to São José in the following year before signing a contract with Corinthians for the 2017 season.

Alanna moved to Santos in 2018, being a regular starter before suffering a knee injury which kept her sidelined for more than a year.

== International career ==
Alanna represented Brazil at the under-20 level in the 2010 South American U-20 Women's Championship and the 2010 FIFA U-20 Women's World Cup, being the top goalscorer of the former tournament with seven goals.

== Honours ==
=== Club ===
São José-SP

- Copa Libertadores Femenina: 2013
- Campeonato Paulista de Futebol Feminino: 2015

Santos

- Campeonato Paulista de Futebol Feminino: 2018
- Copa Paulista de Futebol Feminino: 2020

=== International ===
Brazil

- South American U-20 Women's Championship: 2010
