= Ariel Grana =

Argentine footballer

Personal information
- Full name: Ariel Damian Grana
- Date of birth: January 19, 1976 (age 50)
- Place of birth: Capital Federal, Argentina
- Position: Defender

Senior career*
Years	Team	Apps	(Gls)
2004–2005	FBC Unione Venezia	2	
- * Club domestic league appearances and goals as of 18:44, 19 April 2011 (UTC)

Ariel Damian Grana (born 19 January 1976) is an Argentinian footballer who last played for Porto Corallo. He made his Serie B debut with FBC Unione Venezia in the 2004–05 season.
