= Nubiluz Rangel =

Venezuelan footballer (born 1993)

Personal information
- Full name: Nubiluz De La Trinidad Rangel Quintero
- Date of birth: 13 August 1993 (age 33)
- Place of birth: San Cristobal, Republic of Venezuela
- Height: 1.64 m (5 ft 4 1/2 in)
- Position: Defender

Team information
- Current team: Colo-Colo

Senior career*
Years	Team	Apps	(Gls)
- Independiente La Fría
- Rush Soccer Club
2016	Sportivo Limpeño		
2017	Cúcuta Deportivo		
2017	Sportivo Limpeño		
2018	Atlético Nacional		
2018	Colo-Colo		

International career^{‡}
2014–	Venezuela	12	(0)
- * Club domestic league appearances and goals ‡ National team caps and goals as of 30 July 2018

Nubiluz De La Trinidad Rangel Quintero (born 13 August 1993) is a Venezuelan footballer who plays as a defender for Chilean club Colo-Colo and the Venezuela women's national team.

== International career ==
Rangel represented Venezuela at two Central American and Caribbean Games editions (2014 and 2018) and the 2018 Copa América Femenina.
