= Karla Torres (footballer, born 1992) =

Venezuelan footballer (born 1992)

Personal information
- Full name: Karla Yunesca Torres Gómez
- Date of birth: 4 June 1992 (age 34)
- Place of birth: Caracas, Venezuela
- Position: Midfielder

Senior career*
Years	Team	Apps	(Gls)
2013–2014	Universidad Central		
2014–2015	Estudiantes de Guárico		
2016	Caracas		
2017–2018	Atlético Huila		
2018	Colo-Colo		
2019	Iranduba	3	(0)
2019	Junior	1	(0)
2020	Paio Pires	4	(2)
2020	Valadares Gaia B	1	(0)
2021	Valadares Gaia	1	(0)
2021	Fortaleza	3	(0)

International career^{‡}
2010–2018	Venezuela	8	(0)
- * Club domestic league appearances and goals as of 4 July 2021 ‡ National team caps and goals as of 27 July 2018

Karla Yunesca Torres Gómez (born 4 June 1992) is a Venezuelan former professional footballer who played as a midfielder. She was a Venezuela international player.

== Club career ==
Torres has played for Brazilian club EC Iranduba da Amazônia.

== International career ==
Torres played for Venezuela at senior level in two Central American and Caribbean Games editions (2010 and 2018) and two Copa América Femenina editions (2010 and 2014).
