= Lorena Graña =

Uruguayan footballer (born 1997)

Personal information
- Full name: Lorena Johana Graña Fernández
- Date of birth: 18 February 1997 (age 29)
- Place of birth: Canelones, Uruguay
- Height: 1.62 m (5 ft 4 in)
- Position: Right back

Team information
- Current team: Peñarol
- Number: 20

Senior career*
Years	Team	Apps	(Gls)
2013	Peñarol		
2014–2016	Colón	39	(10)
2017–	Peñarol	34	(5)

International career^{‡}
2014	Uruguay U20		
2019–	Uruguay	2	(0)
- * Club domestic league appearances and goals ‡ National team caps and goals as of 25 May 2025

Lorena Johana Graña Fernández (born 18 February 1997) is a Uruguayan footballer who plays as a right back for CA Peñarol and the Uruguay women's national team.

== International career ==
Graña represented Uruguay at the 2014 South American U-20 Women's Championship. She made her senior debut on 4 March 2019 in a 0–6 friendly loss to France.
