= Fabiana Vallejos =

Argentine footballer

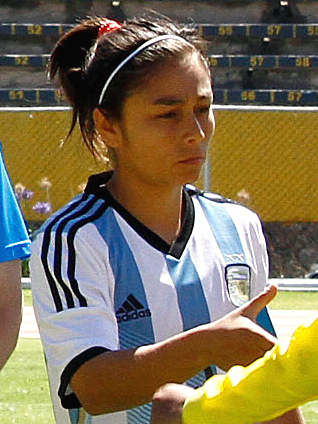
- Vallejos with Argentina in 2014

Personal information
- Full name: Fabiana Gisela Vallejos
- Date of birth: 30 July 1985 (age 41)
- Place of birth: San Isidro, Buenos Aires, Argentina
- Height: 1.55 m (5 ft 1 in)
- Positions: Midfielder; forward

Team information
- Current team: San Luis FC

Senior career*
Years	Team	Apps	(Gls)
- Boca Juniors
- River Plate
- Boca Juniors
2009–2010	Everton		
2011	Cobreloa		
201?–2014	River Plate		
2014–201?	Boca Juniors		
2017	Granada		
2018	Atlético Huila		
2019–2021	Boca Juniors		
2022	Santa Fe		
2022	Santiago Morning		
2023–2024	Deportivo Cali		
2024	Coquimbo Unido	28	(9)
2025	Universidad de Chile		
2025	Santiago Wanderers	2	(0)
2025–	San Luis FC		

International career
2003–	Argentina	17	(4)
Medal record
Women's football
Representing Argentina
South American Games
Gold medal – first place	2014 Santiago	Team
- * Club domestic league appearances and goals

Fabiana Gisela Vallejos (born 30 July 1985) is an Argentine footballer who plays as a midfielder for San Luis FC.

== Club career ==
In 2024, Vallejos moved to Chile and joined Coquimbo Unido in the top division. The next year, she signed to Universidad de Chile and switched to Santiago Wanderers in the second half of the year.

After making two appearances for Santiago Wanderers, Vallejos returned to her homeland and joined San Luis FC.

== International career ==
Vallejos became a member of the Argentine national team during a historic period for the team: She helped the team qualify for the 2003 FIFA Women's World Cup in the United States. It was the first time that Argentina reached the World Cup on the women's side.

She also participated at the 2003 Dominican Republic Pan American Games, the 2003 and the 2006 Sudamericano Femenino. She won the 2006 title with the Argentine team, defeating continental rivals Brazil for the first time ever.

Vallejos also played all three of Argentina's matches at the 2007 FIFA Women's World Cup in China.

== Career statistics ==
=== International goals ===
Scores and results list Argentina's goal tally first

No.	Date	Venue	Opponent	Score	Result	Competition
1	18 November 2006	Estadio José María Minella, Mar del Plata, Argentina	Colombia	2–0	6–0	2006 South American Women's Football Championship
2	18 November 2006	Estadio José María Minella, Mar del Plata, Argentina	Colombia	5–0	6–0	2006 South American Women's Football Championship
3	14 September 2014	Estadio Bellavista, Ambato, Ecuador	Bolivia	1–0	6–0	2014 Copa América Femenina
4	14 September 2014	Estadio Bellavista, Ambato, Ecuador	Bolivia	4–0	6–0	2014 Copa América Femenina
