= Yessenia Huenteo =

Chilean footballer (born 1992)

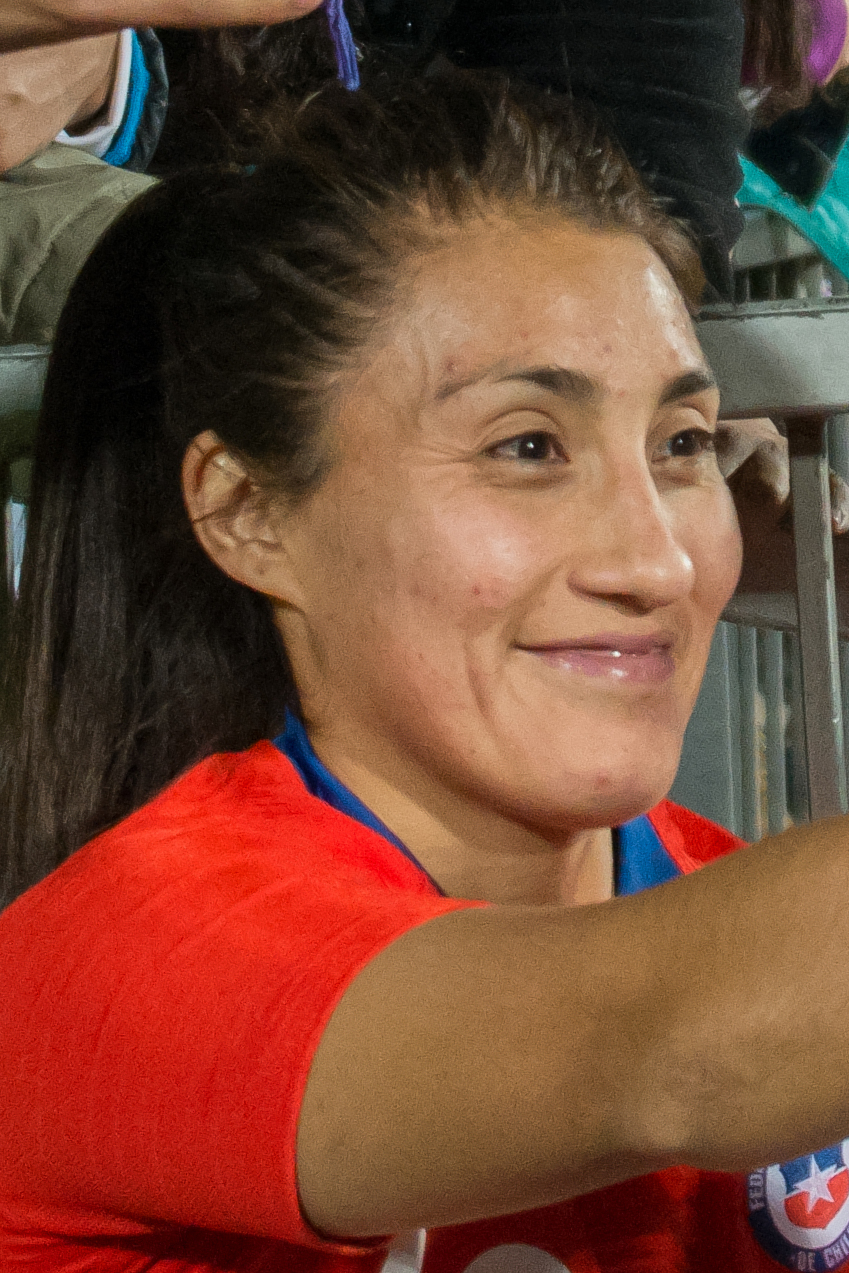
- Huenteo (No. 19) taking a photo of herself on her phone in 2019

Personal information
- Full name: Yessenia Estefani Huenteo Cheuquemán
- Date of birth: 30 October 1992 (age 34)
- Place of birth: Santiago, Chile
- Height: 1.55 m (5 ft 1 in)
- Position: Right winger

Team information
- Current team: Deportes Iquique

Senior career*
| Years | Team | Apps | (Gls) |
| 2012 | Audax Italiano | | |
| 2013–2018 | Colo-Colo | | |
| 2019–2020 | CFF Cáceres | 21 | (2) |
| 2020–2021 | Audax Italiano | | |
| 2021 | Palestino | | |
| 2022–2024 | Universidad de Chile | | |
| 2025– | Deportes Iquique | | |

International career^{‡}
| 2012 | Chile U20 | 2+ | (2) |
| 2010– | Chile | 48 | (1) |
Medal record
Women's football
Representing Chile
South American Games
| Silver medal – second place | 2014 Santiago | Team |
- * Club domestic league appearances and goals ‡ National team caps and goals as of 01:30, 17 June 2019 (UTC)

Yessenia Estefani Huenteo Cheuquemán (born 30 October 1992) is a Chilean footballer who plays as a right winger for Deportes Iquique.

== Club career ==
From 2022 to 2024, Huenteo played for Universidad de Chile. The next year, she joined Deportes Iquique.

== International career ==
Huenteo represented Chile at the 2012 South American U-20 Women's Championship. She also was a member of the Chile squad that won the silver medal at the 2014 South American Games.

== Honours ==
Colo-Colo

- Chilean women's football championship (8): 2013 Apertura, 2013 Clausura, 2014 Apertura, 2014 Clausura, 2015 Apertura, 2016 Clausura, 2017 Apertura, 2017 Clausura

Chile

- South American Games Silver medal: 2014

== Personal life ==
Huenteo is of Mapuche descent.

In November 2016, Huenteo starred in Somos Chile (We are Chile), a web series created by the ANFP which reflects the process of multiculturalism that Chile has been going through that decade, in hopes to combat forms of discrimination such as racism and xenophobia. In the series, Huenteo declared herself proud of her mapuche heritage, but at the same time felt ashamed when receiving racist chants by some supporters.
