= Atlético Huila (women) =

Atlético Huila Femenino
- Full name: Club Deportivo Atlético Huila Femenino S. A.
- Nicknames: Las Opitas; Las Bambuqueras; Las Auriverdes
- Founded: 2016; 10 years ago
- Dissolved: 2024; 2 years ago

Atlético Huila Femenino was a women's football club based in Neiva, Huila, Colombia. Founded in 2016, it was the women's section of Atlético Huila and took part in the Colombian Women's Football League organized by Dimayor, the top level women's football league in Colombia.

Atlético Huila won the league championship in 2018, having finished runner-up in the previous season. They also won the 2018 edition of the Copa Libertadores Femenina, thus becoming the first Colombian champion team of the continental club competition.

== History ==
Atlético Huila Femenino was formed in 2016. The División Mayor del Fútbol Profesional Colombiano (Dimayor) announced in early 2016 that there would be a professional women's football league in Colombia. However, it was not until 20 October of the same year that the official launch of the championship took place in Cartagena. Atlético Huila Femenino was officially presented in October 2016 in the city of Neiva. The club agreed to the dispute of the Colombian professional league by making use of its right to participate thanks to having sports recognition from Coldeportes and Dimayor.

The team entered a hiatus starting from 2020, when it withdrew from the domestic league owing to financial reasons. Although they returned to the league for the 2022 season, the team did not enter the league since 2024 as the club's owners opted to focus on the men's and youth teams.

== Honours ==
=== Domestic ===
- Liga Femenina Profesional
  - Winners (1): 2018

=== Continental ===
- Copa Libertadores Femenina
  - Winners (1): 2018
