= 2020 South American Under-20 Women's Football Championship =

9th edition of the South American Under-20 Women's Football Championship

CONMEBOL Sub 20 Femenino Argentina 2020

Tournament details
- Host country: Argentina
- Dates: 4–14 March 2020 (first stage); Final stage cancelled (originally between 16–22 March 2020)
- Teams: 10 (from 1 confederation)
- Venue: 2 (in 2 host cities)

Tournament statistics
- Matches played: 20
- Goals scored: 67 (3.35 per match)
- Top scorer: (Uruguay) Esperanza Pizarro (7 goals)

The 2020 South American Under-20 Women's Football Championship was the 9th edition of the South American Under-20 Women's Football Championship (Spanish: CONMEBOL Sudamericano Femenino Sub-20), the biennial international youth football championship organised by CONMEBOL for the women's under-20 national teams of South America. It was partially held in Argentina between 4–14 March 2020 until it was suspended and later cancelled due to the COVID-19 pandemic.

The tournament was originally scheduled to be held between 4–22 March 2020. However, on 12 March 2020, CONMEBOL announced that the tournament would be suspended once the first stage ends and that the final stage (originally scheduled to be played from 16 to 22 March) would be postponed for dates and venue to be confirmed, due to the outbreak of COVID-19 pandemic in South America.

CONMEBOL announced on 19 March 2020 that the tournament would be resumed in early July. On 1 June 2020, after FIFA postponed the 2020 FIFA U-20 Women's World Cup until January/February 2021 due to the COVID-19 pandemic, CONMEBOL announced that the final stage would be played in October. On 6 August 2020, CONMEBOL confirmed that the final stage would be played between 16 and 22 November 2020. On 30 October 2020, CONMEBOL further postponed the final stage to January 2021.

In November 2020 FIFA decides to cancel the 2021 FIFA U-20 Women's World Cup due to health and safety reasons related to the COVID-19 pandemic. Consequently, on 25 November, CONMEBOL announced that the final stage would be held in the second half of 2021 in order to complete the tournament. Eventually, CONMEBOL decided to cancel the final stage of the tournament during a meeting of its council held on 3 August 2021.

As the 2021 FIFA U-20 Women's World Cup was cancelled this tournament would not have served as qualifier for any FIFA U-20 Women's World Cup. Originally the top two teams would have qualified as the CONMEBOL representatives.

Brazil are the defending champions.

== Teams ==
All ten CONMEBOL member national teams are eligible to enter the tournament.

Team	Appearance	Previous best top-4 performance
Argentina (hosts)	9th	Runners-up (2006, 2008, 2012)
Bolivia	9th	Fourth place (2004, 2014)
Brazil (holders)	9th	Champions (2004, 2006, 2008, 2010, 2012, 2014, 2015, 2018)
Chile	9th	Fourth place (2008, 2010)
Colombia	9th	Runners-up (2010)
Ecuador	9th	Third place (2004)
Paraguay	9th	Runners-up (2004, 2014, 2018)
Peru	9th	Fourth place (2006)
Uruguay	9th	None
Venezuela	9th	Runners-up (2015)

== Venues ==
The matches will be played in two venues in two cities.

- Estadio San Juan del Bicentenario, San Juan, San Juan Province
- Estadio Provincial Juan Gilberto Funes, La Punta, San Luis Province

== Draw ==
The draw of the tournament was held on 11 January 2020, 10:00 ART (UTC−3), at the headquarters of the Argentine Football Association in Buenos Aires. The ten teams were drawn into two groups of five teams. The hosts Argentina and the defending champions Brazil were seeded into Groups A and B respectively, while the other eight teams were divided into four pots based on their results in the 2018 South American Under-20 Women's Football Championship, and were drawn to the remaining group positions.

Seeded	Pot 1	Pot 2	Pot 3	Pot 4
Argentina (assigned to A1); Brazil (assigned to B1)	Paraguay; Colombia	Venezuela; Chile	Ecuador; Uruguay	Bolivia; Peru

== Squads ==
Players born on or after 1 January 2000 are eligible to compete in the tournament. Each team could register a maximum of 22 players.

== Match officials ==
A total of 10 referees, 20 assistant referees, and two support referees were selected for the tournament.

== First stage ==
The top two teams of each group advance to the final stage.

Tiebreakers

The ranking of teams in the first stage is determined as follows (Regulations Article 8):

1. Points obtained in all group matches (three points for a win, one for a draw, none for a defeat);
2. Goal difference in all group matches;
3. Number of goals scored in all group matches;
4. Points obtained in the matches played between the teams in question;
5. Goal difference in the matches played between the teams in question;
6. Number of goals scored in the matches played between the teams in question;
7. Fair play points in all group matches (only one deduction could be applied to a player in a single match):
  - Yellow card: −1 points;
  - Indirect red card (second yellow card): −3 points;
  - Direct red card: −4 points;
  - Yellow card and direct red card: −5 points;
8. Drawing of lots.

All times local, ART (UTC−3).

=== Group A ===
Pos	Team	Pld	W	D	L	GF	GA	GD	Pts	Qualification
1	Venezuela	4	3	1	0	14	1	+13	10	Final stage
2	Colombia	4	2	1	1	13	2	+11	7	Final stage
3	Argentina (H)	4	1	3	0	2	1	+1	6	
4	Ecuador	4	1	0	3	2	12	−10	3	
5	Bolivia	4	0	1	3	1	16	−15	1	

Source: CONMEBOL
Rules for classification: Group stage tiebreakers
(H) Hosts
4 March 2020
19:00

Colombia	8–0	Bolivia
Robledo 8', 43'; Pérez 6'; Guerra 12'; Vanegas 58', 90'; Reyes 75'; Paví 90+3'	Report

Estadio San Juan del Bicentenario, San Juan
Referee: Elizabeth Tintaya (Peru)
4 March 2020
21:15

Argentina	1–0	Ecuador
Braun 59'	Report

Estadio San Juan del Bicentenario, San Juan
Referee: Zulma Quiñónez (Paraguay)

6 March 2020
19:00

Bolivia	0–5	Venezuela
	Report	Capdevilla 42'; Borges 63'; Argüelles 72'; Jiménez 73'; Moreno 78' (pen.)

Estadio San Juan del Bicentenario, San Juan
Referee: Silvia Ríos (Uruguay)
6 March 2020
21:15

Argentina	0–0	Colombia
	Report

Estadio San Juan del Bicentenario, San Juan
Referee: Edina Alves Batista (Brazil)

8 March 2020
19:00

Venezuela	2–1	Colombia
Capdevilla 55'; Argüelles 75'	Report	Vanegas 6'

Estadio San Juan del Bicentenario, San Juan
Referee: María Carvajal (Chile)
8 March 2020
21:15

Bolivia	0–2	Ecuador
	Report	Arreaga 80'; Jácome 85'

Estadio San Juan del Bicentenario, San Juan
Referee: Elizabeth Tintaya (Peru)

11 March 2020
19:00

Ecuador	0–4	Colombia
	Report	Robledo 10', 18', 77'; Guerra 15'

Estadio San Juan del Bicentenario, San Juan
Referee: Edina Alves Batista (Brazil)
11 March 2020
21:15

Argentina	0–0	Venezuela
	Report

Estadio San Juan del Bicentenario, San Juan
Referee: Silvia Ríos (Uruguay)

13 March 2020
19:00

Venezuela	7–0	Ecuador
Higuera 38', 50', 86'; Argüelles 45+2'; Olivieri 57', 89'; Moreno 59'	Report

Estadio San Juan del Bicentenario, San Juan
Referee: María Carvajal (Chile)
13 March 2020
21:15

Argentina	1–1	Bolivia
De Ángelis 2'	Report	Flores 45+1'

Estadio San Juan del Bicentenario, San Juan
Referee: Zulma Quiñónez (Paraguay)

=== Group B ===
Pos	Team	Pld	W	D	L	GF	GA	GD	Pts	Qualification
1	Brazil	4	4	0	0	14	0	+14	12	Final stage
2	Uruguay	4	3	0	1	13	10	+3	9	Final stage
3	Paraguay	4	2	0	2	6	7	−1	6	
4	Chile	4	0	1	3	2	6	−4	1	
5	Peru	4	0	1	3	0	12	−12	1	

Source: CONMEBOL
Rules for classification: Group stage tiebreakers
5 March 2020
19:00

Paraguay	1–0	Chile
Fretes 90+2' (pen.)	Report

Estadio Provincial Juan Gilberto Funes, La Punta
Referee: Laura Fortunato (Argentina)
5 March 2020
21:15

Brazil	3–0	Peru
Nycole 29'; Jaqueline 34' (pen.), 49'	Report

Estadio Provincial Juan Gilberto Funes, La Punta
Referee: Adriana Farfán (Bolivia)

7 March 2020
19:00

Chile	2–3	Uruguay
Olave 40'; Alarcón 90+4'	Report	Olivera 15'; Aquino 45+3'; Pizarro 90+1'

Estadio Provincial Juan Gilberto Funes, La Punta
Referee: Viviana Muñoz (Colombia)
7 March 2020
21:15

Brazil	3–0	Paraguay
Micaelly 12', 24'; Jheniffer 61'	Report

Estadio Provincial Juan Gilberto Funes, La Punta
Referee: Susana Corella (Ecuador)

9 March 2020
19:00

Uruguay	4–2	Paraguay
Bermúdez 45+3'; Pizarro 48', 62', 75'	Report	Sánchez 56'; Coronel 77'

Estadio Provincial Juan Gilberto Funes, La Punta
Referee: Adriana Farfán (Bolivia)
9 March 2020
21:15

Chile	0–0	Peru
	Report

Estadio Provincial Juan Gilberto Funes, La Punta
Referee: María Herrán (Venezuela)

12 March 2020
19:00

Peru	0–3	Paraguay
	Report	Barreto 49'; Sánchez 73'; Melgarejo 87'

Estadio Provincial Juan Gilberto Funes, La Punta
Referee: Viviana Muñoz (Colombia)
12 March 2020
21:15

Brazil	6–0	Uruguay
Jaqueline 6'; Micaelly 14', 60'; Nycole 21'; Camila 50'; Mylena 66'	Report

Estadio Provincial Juan Gilberto Funes, La Punta
Referee: Laura Fortunato (Argentina)

14 March 2020
19:00

Uruguay	6–0	Peru
Bermúdez 11', 43'; Pizarro 17', 53', 55'; Carballo 90+2'

Estadio Provincial Juan Gilberto Funes, La Punta
Referee: Susana Corella (Ecuador)
14 March 2020
21:15

Brazil	2–0	Chile
Ana Vitória 13'; Jaqueline 84'

Estadio Provincial Juan Gilberto Funes, La Punta
Referee: María Herrán (Venezuela)

== Final stage ==
The ranking of teams in the final stage is determined using the same tiebreakers as in the first stage, taking into account only matches in the final stage (Regulations Article 8).

The top two teams would have qualified for the 2021 FIFA U-20 Women's World Cup.

Pos	Team	Pld	W	D	L	GF	GA	GD	Pts
1	Brazil	0	0	0	0	0	0	0	0
2	Colombia	0	0	0	0	0	0	0	0
3	Uruguay	0	0	0	0	0	0	0	0
4	Venezuela	0	0	0	0	0	0	0	0

First match(es) will be played: TBD. Source: CONMEBOL
Rules for classification: Final stage tiebreakers

Brazil	v	Colombia

Estadio San Juan del Bicentenario, San Juan

Venezuela	v	Uruguay

Estadio San Juan del Bicentenario, San Juan

Brazil	v	Uruguay

Estadio San Juan del Bicentenario, San Juan

Venezuela	v	Colombia

Estadio San Juan del Bicentenario, San Juan

Colombia	v	Uruguay

Estadio San Juan del Bicentenario, San Juan

Venezuela	v	Brazil

Estadio San Juan del Bicentenario, San Juan

== Goalscorers ==
There have been 67 goals scored in 20 matches, for an average of 3.35 goals per match (as of 14 March 2019).

7 goals

- (Uruguay) Esperanza Pizarro

5 goals

- (Colombia) Gisela Robledo

4 goals

- (Brazil) Micaelly
- (Brazil) Jaqueline

3 goals

- (Colombia) Manuela Vanegas
- (Uruguay) Karol Bermúdez
- (Venezuela) Wilmary Argüelles
- (Venezuela) Enyer Higuera

2 goals

- (Brazil) Nycole
- (Colombia) Ingrid Guerra
- (Paraguay) Jessica Sánchez
- (Venezuela) Kareylen Capdevilla
- (Venezuela) Yerliane Moreno

1 goal

- (Argentina) Sophia Braun
- (Argentina) Brisa De Ángelis
- (Bolivia) Marlene Flores
- (Brazil) Ana Vitória
- (Brazil) Camila
- (Brazil) Jheniffer
- (Brazil) Mylena
- (Chile) Antonia Alarcón
- (Chile) Isidora Olave
- (Colombia) Maireth Pérez
- (Colombia) Manuela Paví
- (Colombia) María Reyes
- (Ecuador) Maylin Arreaga
- (Ecuador) Arella Jácome
- (Paraguay) Liz Barreto
- (Paraguay) Zunilda Coronel
- (Paraguay) Limpia Fretes
- (Paraguay) María Melgarejo
- (Uruguay) Belén Aquino
- (Uruguay) Wendy Carballo
- (Uruguay) Daniela Olivera
- (Venezuela) Osmailyn Borges
- (Venezuela) Marianyela Jiménez
- (Venezuela) Bárbara Olivieri
