= 2022 Argentinian Women's Handball Championship A =

Argentinian Women's Handball Championship A
- Season: 2022
- Dates: 6 – 10 December 2022
- Champion: River Plate
- Relegated: Club de Regatas San Nicolás; Escuela Municipal de Km 5
- South and Central Championship: River Plate; Ferro Carril Oeste; Jockey Club Córdoba; Club Mendoza de Regatas
- Matches played: 20
- Goals scored: 1,005 (50.25 per match)
- All statistics correct as of 2 June 2023.

The 2022 Argentinian Women's Handball Championship A (known as the Nacional A Clubes Adultos – San Luis 2022) was a season of the Argentinian Women's Handball Championship A, Argentina's premier handball tournament. It ram from 6 to 10 December 2022.

== Preliminary round ==
=== Group A ===
Pos	Team	Pld	W	D	L	GF	GA	GD	Pts	Qualification
1	Ferro Carril Oeste	3	3	0	0	92	56	+36	9	Semifinals
2	Jockey Club Córdoba	3	2	0	1	63	60	+3	7	Semifinals
3	Club Atlético Once Unidos	3	1	0	2	70	69	+1	5	5–8th place semifinals
4	Escuela Municipal de Km 5	3	0	0	3	51	91	−40	3	5–8th place semifinals

Source: CAH

6 December 2012; 16:45	Ferro Carril Oeste	34–16	Escuela Municipal de Km 5	Estadio Campus Universidad de La Punta, La Punta, San Luis

6 December 2012; 16:45	Jockey Club Córdoba	19–17	Club Atlético Once Unidos	Centro de Desarrollo Deportivo Pedro Presti, San Luis

7 December 2012; 15:00	Club Atlético Once Unidos	22–32	Ferro Carril Oeste	Estadio Campus Universidad de La Punta, La Punta, San Luis

7 December 2012; 15:00	Escuela Municipal de Km 5	17–26	Jockey Club Córdoba	Centro de Desarrollo Deportivo Pedro Presti, San Luis

8 December 2012; 15:00	Ferro Carril Oeste	26–18	Jockey Club Córdoba	Centro de Desarrollo Deportivo Pedro Presti, San Luis

8 December 2012; 15:00	Club Atlético Once Unidos	31–18	Escuela Municipal de Km 5	Estadio Campus Universidad de La Punta, La Punta, San Luis

=== Group B ===
Pos	Team	Pld	W	D	L	GF	GA	GD	Pts	Qualification
1	River Plate	3	3	0	0	105	67	+38	9	Semifinals
2	CID Moreno	3	2	0	1	84	68	+16	7	Semifinals
3	Club Mendoza de Regatas	3	1	0	2	82	86	−4	5	5–8th place semifinals
4	Club de Regatas San Nicolás	3	0	0	3	63	113	−50	3	5–8th place semifinals

Source: CAH

6 December 2012; 15:00	River Plate	44–18	Club de Regatas San Nicolás	Estadio Campus Universidad de La Punta, La Punta, San Luis

6 December 2012; 15:00	CID Moreno	28–20	Club Mendoza de Regatas	Centro de Desarrollo Deportivo Pedro Presti, San Luis

7 December 2012; 10:30	Club Mendoza de Regatas	24–33	River Plate	Estadio Campus Universidad de La Punta, La Punta, San Luis

7 December 2012; 10:30	Club de Regatas San Nicolás	20–31	CID Moreno	Centro de Desarrollo Deportivo Pedro Presti, San Luis

8 December 2012; 10:30	River Plate	28–25	CID Moreno	Estadio Campus Universidad de La Punta, La Punta, San Luis

8 December 2012; 10:30	Club Mendoza de Regatas	38–25	Club de Regatas San Nicolás	Centro de Desarrollo Deportivo Pedro Presti, San Luis

== Knockout stage ==
=== Bracket ===
5–8th place semifinals
A3	Club Atlético Once Unidos	36
B4	Club de Regatas San Nicolás	23
B3	Club Mendoza de Regatas	26
A4	Escuela Municipal de Km 5	19

Fifth place
A3	Club Atlético Once Unidos	22
B3	Club Mendoza de Regatas	26
Seventh place
B4	Club de Regatas San Nicolás	28
A4	Escuela Municipal de Km 5	23

Semifinals
A1	Ferro Carril Oeste	27
B2	CID Moreno	25
B1	River Plate	32
A2	Jockey Club Córdoba	23

Finals
A1	Ferro Carril Oeste	17
B1	River Plate	29
Third place
B2	CID Moreno	21
A2	Jockey Club Córdoba	18

=== 5–8th place semifinals ===
9 December 2012; 10:00	Club Atlético Once Unidos	36–23	Club de Regatas San Nicolás	Estadio Campus Universidad de La Punta, La Punta, San Luis

9 December 2012; 10:00	Club Mendoza de Regatas	26–19	Escuela Municipal de Km 5	Centro de Desarrollo Deportivo Pedro Presti, San Luis

=== Semifinals ===
9 December 2012; 11:45	Ferro Carril Oeste	27–25	CID Moreno	Estadio Campus Universidad de La Punta, La Punta, San Luis

9 December 2012; 13:30	River Plate	32–23	Jockey Club Córdoba	Estadio Campus Universidad de La Punta, La Punta, San Luis

=== Seventh place game ===
10 December 2012; 10:00	Club de Regatas San Nicolás	28–23	Escuela Municipal de Km 5	Centro de Desarrollo Deportivo Pedro Presti, San Luis

=== Fifth place game ===
10 December 2012; 13:30	Club Atlético Once Unidos	22–26	Club Mendoza de Regatas	Centro de Desarrollo Deportivo Pedro Presti, San Luis

=== Third place game ===
10 December 2012; 13:30	CID Moreno	21–18	Jockey Club Córdoba	Estadio Campus Universidad de La Punta, La Punta, San Luis

=== Final ===
10 December 2012; 13:30	Ferro Carril Oeste	17–29	River Plate	Estadio Campus Universidad de La Punta, La Punta, San Luis

== Final standing ==
Rank	Team
1	River Plate
2	Ferro Carril Oeste
3	CID Moreno
4	Jockey Club Córdoba
5	Club Mendoza de Regatas
6	Club Atlético Once Unidos
7	Club de Regatas San Nicolás
8	Escuela Municipal de Km 5

Teams qualified to the 2023 South and Central American Women's Club Handball Championship
Teams relegated to 2023 Argentinian Women's Handball Championship B
