= List of football stadiums in Argentina =

The following is a list of football stadiums in Argentina, ordered by capacity. Stadiums with a capacity of 10,000 or more are included. Below the list is another one with stadiums with a capacity below 10,000.

== Current stadiums ==
| # | Image | Stadium | Capacity | City | Province | Home team(s) | Opened | Ref |
|---|---|---|---|---|---|---|---|---|
| 1 | | Más Monumental | 85,018 | Buenos Aires | (autonomous city) | River Plate (Note: Also hosted matches of the Argentina national team.) | 1938 | |
| 2 | | La Bombonera | 58,305 | Buenos Aires | (autonomous city) | Boca Juniors | 1940 | |
| 3 | Estadio Mario Alberto Kempes | Mario Alberto Kempes | 57,000 | Córdoba | Córdoba | Belgrano; Instituto; Racing; Talleres | 1978 | |
| 4 | | Único Diego Armando Maradona | 53,000 | La Plata | Buenos Aires | Estudiantes; Gimnasia y Esgrima (Note: Also hosted matches of the Argentina national rugby team.) | 2003 | |
| 5 | | El Cilindro | 50,880 | Avellaneda | Buenos Aires | Racing | 1950 | |
| 6 | | José Amalfitani | 49,540 | Buenos Aires | (autonomous city) | Vélez Sársfield | 1951 | |
| 7 | Estadio Marcelo Bielsa | Marcelo Bielsa | 49,000 | Rosario | Santa Fe | Newell's Old Boys | 1911 | |
| 8 | | Tomás Adolfo Ducó | 48,314 | Buenos Aires | (autonomous city) | Huracán | 1949 | |
| 9 | | Pedro Bidegain | 47,964 | Buenos Aires | (autonomous city) | San Lorenzo | 1993 | |
| 10 | | Gigante de Arroyito | 46,955 | Rosario | Santa Fe | Rosario Central | 1926 | |
| 11 | | Ciudad de Lanús | 45,319 | Lanús | Buenos Aires | Lanús | 1929 | |
| 12 | | Libertadores de América | 42,069 | Avellaneda | Buenos Aires | Independiente | 1928 | |
| 13 | Estadio Malvinas Argentinas | Malvinas Argentinas | 42,000 | Mendoza | Mendoza | Godoy Cruz, Independiente Rivadavia, San Martín | 1978 | |
| 14 | | Monumental José Fierro | 35,200 | San Miguel de Tucumán | Tucumán | Atlético Tucumán | 1922 | |
| 15 | | José María Minella | 35,180 | Mar del Plata | Buenos Aires | Aldosivi; Alvarado | 1978 | |
| 16 | | Eduardo Gallardón | 35,000 | Lomas de Zamora | Buenos Aires | Los Andes | 1940 | |
| 17 | | Florencio Sola | 34,900 | Banfield | Buenos Aires | Banfield | 1940 | |
| 18 | | Jorge Luis Hirschi | 32,530 | La Plata | Buenos Aires | Estudiantes | 1907 | |
| 19 | | Nueva España | 32,500 | Buenos Aires | (autonomous city) | Deportivo Español | 1981 | |
| 20 | | Nuevo Francisco Urbano | 32,000 | Morón | Buenos Aires | Deportivo Morón | 2013 | |
| 21 | | Juan Carmelo Zerillo | 30,973 | La Plata | Buenos Aires | Gimnasia y Esgrima | 1924 | |
| 22 | | Brigadier General Estanislao López | 30,835 | Santa Fe | Santa Fe | Colón | 1946 | |
| 23 | | Julio César Villagra | 30,500 | Córdoba | Córdoba | Belgrano | 1929 | |
| 24 | | La Ciudadela | 30,250 | San Miguel de Tucumán | Tucumán | San Martín | 1932 | |
| 25 | | Centenario Ciudad de Quilmes | 30,200 | Quilmes | Buenos Aires | Quilmes AC | 1995 | |
| 26 | | Madre de Ciudades | 30,000 | Santiago del Estero | Santiago del Estero | Central Córdoba; Mitre | 2020 | |
| 27 | | Ciudad de Vicente López | 28,530 | Vicente López | Buenos Aires | Platense | 1979 | |
| 28 | | Único de Villa Mercedes | 28,000 | Villa Mercedes | San Luis | (Note: Operated by Liga Mercedina de Fútbol, the regional football league of Villa Mercedes.) | 2017 | |
| 29 | | José Dellagiovanna | 26,282 | Victoria | Buenos Aires | Tigre | 1936 | |
| 30 | | 15 de Abril | 26,000 | Santa Fe | Santa Fe | Unión | 1929 | |
| 31 | | Alfredo Beranger | 26,000 | Temperley | Buenos Aires | Temperley | 1924 | |
| 32 | | Juan Domingo Perón | 26,000 | Córdoba | Córdoba | Instituto | 1951 | |
| 33 | | Diego Armando Maradona | 26,000 | Buenos Aires | (autonomous city) | Argentinos Juniors | 2003 | |
| 34 | | San Juan del Bicentenario | 25,000 | San Juan | San Juan | San Martín; Sportivo Desamparados | 2011 | |
| 35 | | Centenario | 25,000 | Resistencia | Chaco | Sarmiento | 2011 | |
| 36 | | Único de San Nicolás | 25,000 | San Nicolás | Buenos Aires | (various) (Note: Operated by Liga Nicoleña de Fútbol, the regional football league of San Nicolás Partido.) | 2019 | |
| 37 | | Fragata Presidente Sarmiento | 25,000 | Isidro Casanova | Buenos Aires | Almirante Brown | 1969 | |
| 38 | | Arq. Ricardo Etcheverri | 24,442 | Buenos Aires | (autonomous city) | Ferro Carril Oeste | 1905 | |
| 39 | | Chacarita Juniors | 24,300 | Villa Maipú | Buenos Aires | Chacarita Juniors | 1945 | |
| 40 | | Gigante del Norte | 24,300 | Salta | Salta | Gimnasia y Tiro | 1993 | |
| 41 | | 23 de Agosto | 23,200 | San Salvador de Jujuy | Jujuy | Gimnasia y Esgrima | 1973 | |
| 42 | | Eva Perón | 22,000 | Junín | Buenos Aires | Sarmiento | 1951 | |
| 43 | | Islas Malvinas | 21,500 | Buenos Aires | (autonomous city) | All Boys | 1963 | |
| 44 | | Feliciano Gambarte | 21,000 | Mendoza | Mendoza | Godoy Cruz | 1959 | |
| 45 | | Padre Ernesto Martearena | 21,000 | Salta | Salta | Central Norte; Juventud Antoniana | 2001 | |
| 46 | | Alfredo Terrera | 20,000 | Santiago del Estero | Santiago del Estero | Central Córdoba | 1946 | |
| 47 | | Nueva Chicago | 20,000 (Note: Information about the real capacity varies according to sources. The average sets between 24,000 and 29,000 but the preferred is 20,000 per security reasons.) | Buenos Aires | (autonomous city) | Nueva Chicago | 1940 | |
| 48 | | Julio Grondona | 18,500 | Sarandí | Buenos Aires | Arsenal | 1964 | |
| 49 | | Roberto Carminatti | 18,000 | Bahía Blanca | Buenos Aires | Olimpo | 1942 | |
| 50 | | Don León Kolbowski | 18,000 | Buenos Aires | (autonomous city) | Atlanta | 1960 | |
| 51 | | José Nehin | 18,000 | San Juan | San Juan | Sportivo Desamparados | 1960 | |
| 52 | | Alvaro Pedro Ducás | 16,500 | Neuquén | Neuquén Province | Alianza de Cutral Có | 1963 | |
| 53 | | Ciudad de Caseros | 16,000 | Caseros | Buenos Aires | Estudiantes (BA) | 1963 | |
| 54 | | Estadio Provincial Juan Gilberto Funes | 15,062 | La Punta | San Luis | | 2003 | |
| 55 | | Miguel Sancho | 15,000 | Córdoba | Córdoba | Racing | 1948 | |
| 56 | | José Antonio Romero Feris | 15,000 | Corrientes | Corrientes | Huracán Corrientes | 1986 | |
| 57 | | Raúl Conti | 15,000 | Puerto Madryn | Chubut | Guillermo Brown | 1967 | |
| 58 | | Presbítero Bartolomé Grella | 14,000 | Paraná | Entre Ríos | Patronato | 1956 | |
| 59 | | Norberto Tomaghello | 13,559 | Florencio Varela | Buenos Aires | Defensa y Justicia | 1978 | |
| 60 | | Francisco Cabasés | 13,000 | Córdoba | Córdoba | Talleres | 1931 | |
| 61 | | Tres de Febrero | 13,000 | José Ingenieros | Buenos Aires | Almagro | 1956 | |
| 62 | | Claudio Tapia | 12,000 | Buenos Aires | (autonomous city) | Barracas Central | 1916 | |
| 63 | | Víctor Legrotaglie | 11,000 | Mendoza | Mendoza | Gimnasia y Esgrima | 1934 | |
| 64 | | Gabino Sosa | 10,000 | Rosario | Santa Fe | Central Córdoba | 1907 | |
| 65 | | Comandante Andrés Guacurarí | 10,000 | Garupá | Misiones | Crucero del Norte | 2003 | |

== Stadiums with a capacity below 10,000 ==
| Image | Stadium | Capacity | City | Province | Home team(s) | Opened | Ref |
|---|---|---|---|---|---|---|---|
| | Juan Pasquale | 9,000 | Buenos Aires | (autonomous city) | Defensores de Belgrano | 1910 | |
| | Municipal de Comodoro Rivadavia | 8,000 | Comodoro Rivadavia | Chubut | Comisión de Actividades Infantiles / Huracán / Jorge Newbery | 1942 | |
| | Ofelia Rosenzuaig | 8,000 | Carlos Casares | Buenos Aires | Club Agropecuario | 2012 | |
| | José Martín Olaeta | 8,000 | Rosario | Santa Fe | Argentino de Rosario | 1944 | |
| | Abel Sastre | 8,000 | Puerto Madryn | Chubut | Deportivo Madryn | 2006 | |
| | Omar Higinio Sperdutti | 8,000 | Maipú | Mendoza | Deportivo Maipú | 1932 | |
| | Villa Alonso | 7,000 | Santa Rosa | La Pampa | General Belgrano | 2000 | |
| | Mario Losinno | 6,000 | Zárate | Buenos Aires | Defensores Unidos | 1942 | |
| | Carlos V | 5,000 | Jáuregui | Buenos Aires | Flandria | 1960 | |
| | Alfredo Ramos | 3,000 | Buenos Aires | (autonomous city) | Comunicaciones | 1962 | |
| | Guillermo Laza | 3,000 | Buenos Aires | (autonomous city) | Deportivo Riestra | 1993 | |

== Former football venues ==
Venues that hosted football matches in the past but have other uses nowadays:

| Image | Stadium | Capacity | City | Province | Home team(s) | Opened | Current uses | Ref |
|---|---|---|---|---|---|---|---|---|
| | Plaza Jewell | 4,000 | Rosario | Santa Fe | Atlético del Rosario / Rosario R.U. | 1889 | rugby / field hockey | |
| | Virrey del Pino | 500 | Buenos Aires | (autonomous city) | Belgrano A.C. | 1902 | rugby / cricket | |

== See also ==
- List of South American stadiums by capacity
- List of association football stadiums by capacity
- List of association football stadiums by country
- Lists of stadiums
- Football in Argentina
