= Copa Campeonato =

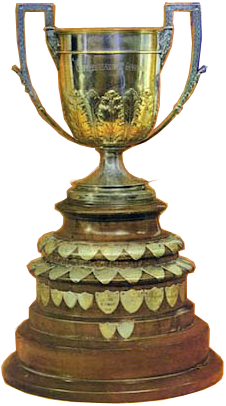
- The trophy awarded to champions
- Organiser(s): AFA
- Founded: 2013
- Abolished: 2014; 12 years ago
- Region: Argentina
- Teams: 2
- Related competitions: Primera División
- Last champions: River Plate (2014)
- Broadcaster(s): TV Pública; Canal 26 (UHF and Pay TV)

The Copa Campeonato Primera División (familiarly known as Superfinal) was an official Argentine football cup competition organized by the Argentine Football Association. It was played in a single match format between the Torneo Inicial and Torneo Final champions.

== History ==
Originally awarded to Primera División champions, the Copa Campeonato is the oldest thropy in Argentine football, having been awarded for the first time in 1896, three years after the Argentine Football Association was established. It received several names over time, such as "Championship Cup", "Copa Campeonato", "Challenge Cup" and "Copa Alumni", due to the association offered legendary team Alumni to keep the Cup definitely for having won it three consecutive times (1900–02), but the club from Belgrano declined the honour to keep the trophy under dispute. Despite this, the competition continued to be played without interruption until 1926.

It was eventually brought back in June 2013, after the Argentine Football Association decided to establish a new format for the 2012–13 Primera División, which would pair the first-placed teams of the two league tournaments held during the Argentine season, the Torneo Inicial and Torneo Final, in a decisive match to determine the season's champion. This format replicated that of the 1990–91 Primera División. However, the Argentine governing body later recanted this arrangement, proceeding to grant three league honours as they followed on the decision to also recognize the two separate tournaments as official championships. Thus, the winner of the Copa Campeonato would not only obtain two league titles during their campaign, but would also qualify to the following season's Supercopa Argentina, and the two continental competitions, the Copa Sudamericana and Copa Libertadores. The first edition was carried out and Vélez Sársfield achieved its 10th league championship after defeating Newell's Old Boys.

The Argentine Football Association would once again change the format for the 2013–14 season, stating that the winner of that season's Copa Campeonato would not earn a Primera División honour. This was due to backlash caused after the regulations for the previous season, which gave way to claims from San Lorenzo and River Plate regarding their merits yielded during the 1936 Argentine Primera División, which was contested similarly to the newly adopted league format. The governing body concurred to those petitions as well, and recognized two more championships from the 1936 season, one to each team.

Due to the 2015 and 2016 seasons were played as single tournaments with only one champion per season, the Copa Campeonato has not held since then.

== Champions ==
Ed.	Year	Champion	Score	Runner-up	Venue	City
1	2013	Vélez Sarsfield (Note: Considered as a Primera División title.)	1–0	Newell's Old Boys	Malvinas Argentinas	Mendoza
2	2014	River Plate (Note: Since this edition the Superfinal was homologated as a domestic cup, not counting as a Primera División title.)	1–0	San Lorenzo	Juan G. Funes	La Punta

=== Titles by team ===
Rank	Team	Titles	Years won
1	Vélez Sarsfield	1	2013
1	River Plate	1	2014
