= Micaelly =

Brazilian footballer

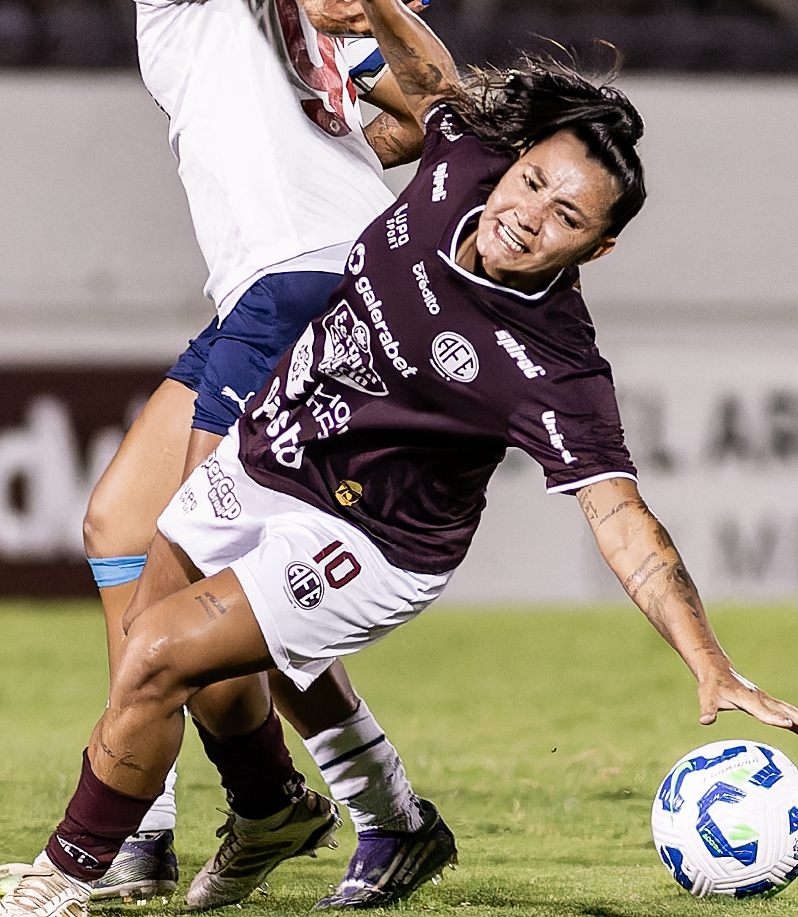
- Micaelly playing for Ferroviária in 2025

Personal information
- Full name: Micaelly Brazil dos Santos
- Date of birth: 26 September 2000 (age 26)
- Place of birth: Autazes, Brazil
- Height: 1.60 m (5 ft 3 in)
- Position: Midfielder

Team information
- Current team: Ferroviária
- Number: 10

Senior career*
Years	Team	Apps	(Gls)
2016–2017	Iranduba	13	(1)
2017–2018	Sport Recife	13	(4)
2019	Avaí	0	(0)
2019–2020	Cruzeiro	24	(7)
2021–2023	São Paulo	51	(10)
2024–	Ferroviária	5	(3)

International career^{‡}
2016	Brazil U17	3	(1)
2020	Brazil U20	4	(4)
2022–	Brazil	1	(0)
- * Club domestic league appearances and goals as of 22:01, 23 April 2024 (UTC) ‡ National team caps and goals as of 20:20, 26 January 2023 (UTC)

Micaelly Brazil dos Santos (born 26 September 2000), simply known as Micaelly, is a Brazilian professional footballer who plays as a midfielder for Ferroviária and the Brazil women's national team.

== Club career ==
=== Iranduba ===
Born in Autazes, Amazonas, Micaelly began her career in futsal before making her senior debut with local side Iranduba in 2016, aged 15.

=== Sport Recife ===
In August 2017, she moved to Sport Recife, signing a deal until the end of 2018. Micaelly made her league debut against São José on 25 April 2018. She scored her first league goal against Pinheirense on 22 May 2018, scoring in the 80th minute.

=== Cruzeiro ===
On 13 March 2019, after a short period at Avaí (where she did not play), Micaelly signed for Cruzeiro. She departed the latter on 23 December 2020.

=== São Paulo ===
Micaelly was announced at São Paulo the following 11 January. She made her league debut against Grêmio on 18 April 2021. Micaelly scored her first league goal against Flamengo on 29 April 2021, scoring a penalty in the 81st minute.

=== Ferroviária ===
Micaelly scored on her league debut against Botafogo on 15 March 2024, scoring in the 83rd minute.

== International career ==
Micaelly scored on her U17 debut against Nigeria U17s on 1 October 2016, scoring in the 41st minute.

Micaelly made her U20 debut against Peru U20s on 6 March 2020. She scored her first goals against Paraguay U20s on 8 March 2020, scoring in the 12th and 24th minute.

After representing Brazil at under-17 and under-20 levels, Micaelly was called up for the full side by manager Pia Sundhage on 27 August 2022, for two friendlies against South Africa. She made her full international debut on 2 September, coming on as a half-time substitute for Kerolin in a 3–0 win at the Orlando Stadium in Soweto.
