= 2023 South and Central American Women's Club Handball Championship =

Tournament details
- Host country: Brazil
- Venue(s): 1 (in 1 host city)
- Dates: 6–10 June
- Teams: 12 (from 1 confederation)

Final positions
- Champions: (Brazil) EC Pinheiros (2nd title)
- Runner-up: (Argentina) River Plate
- Third place: (Brazil) Clube Português
- Fourth place: (Brazil) Nacional Handebol Clube

Tournament statistics
- Matches played: 28
- Goals scored: 1,289 (46.04 per match)

The 2023 South and Central American Women's Club Handball Championship the 3rd edition of this tournament was held in São Paulo, Brazil from 6 to 10 June 2023.

== Participating teams ==
Country	Team	Qualified as	League
Argentina	River Plate	Winner	2022 Argentinian Women's Handball Championship A
Argentina	Ferro Carril Oeste	Runner-up	2022 Argentinian Women's Handball Championship A
Argentina	Jockey Club Córdoba	Fourth	2022 Argentinian Women's Handball Championship A
Argentina	Club Mendoza de Regatas	Fifth	2022 Argentinian Women's Handball Championship A
Brazil	EC Pinheiros	Winner	2022 Liga Nacional de Handebol
Brazil	Clube Português	Runner-up	2022 Liga Nacional de Handebol
Brazil	Ser Unimed Sorocaba	Third	2022 Liga Nacional de Handebol
Brazil	Nacional Handebol Clube	Fifth	2022 Liga Nacional de Handebol
Chile	Ovalle Balonmano	Winner	2022 Liga nacional de balonmano Chile
Chile	Leonas Balonmano	Third	2022 Liga nacional de balonmano Chile
Uruguay	Scuola Italiana di Montevideo	Winner	2022 Uruguayan Women's Handball Championship
Uruguay	Club Atlético Goes	?	2022 Uruguayan Women's Handball Championship

== Preliminary round ==
All times are local (UTC–3).

=== Group 1 ===
Pos	Team	Pld	W	D	L	GF	GA	GD	Pts	Qualification
1	(Argentina) River Plate	2	2	0	0	63	48	+15	4	Semifinals
2	(Brazil) Ser Unimed Sorocaba	2	1	0	1	54	52	+2	2	5–8th place semifinals
3	(Chile) Ovalle Balonmano	2	0	0	2	46	63	−17	0	9–12th place semifinals

Source: Handball SCA

6 June; 20:00	Ovalle Balonmano (Chile)	23–29	(Brazil) Ser Unimed Sorocaba	Ginásio Poliesportivo Henrique Villaboim, São Paulo; Attendance: 323; Referees: Burgos & Lenzue (URU)
6 June; 20:00	Muller 9	(12–11)	Do Nascimiento 7	Ginásio Poliesportivo Henrique Villaboim, São Paulo; Attendance: 323; Referees: Burgos & Lenzue (URU)
6 June; 20:00	2× (suspension)	Report	4× (suspension)	Ginásio Poliesportivo Henrique Villaboim, São Paulo; Attendance: 323; Referees: Burgos & Lenzue (URU)

7 June; 14:00	Ser Unimed Sorocaba (Brazil)	25–29	(Argentina) River Plate	Ginásio Poliesportivo Henrique Villaboim, São Paulo; Attendance: 130; Referees: Godoy & Magalhaes (BRA)
7 June; 14:00	Do Nascimiento 8	(14–15)	Manzano 7	Ginásio Poliesportivo Henrique Villaboim, São Paulo; Attendance: 130; Referees: Godoy & Magalhaes (BRA)
7 June; 14:00	1× (suspension)	Report	1× (yellow card) 3× (suspension)	Ginásio Poliesportivo Henrique Villaboim, São Paulo; Attendance: 130; Referees: Godoy & Magalhaes (BRA)

8 June; 18:00	River Plate (Argentina)	34–23	(Chile) Ovalle Balonmano	Ginásio Poliesportivo Henrique Villaboim, São Paulo; Attendance: 120; Referees: Burgos & Lenzue (URU)
8 June; 18:00	Carletti 8	(17–14)	Canessa & Galvez 5	Ginásio Poliesportivo Henrique Villaboim, São Paulo; Attendance: 120; Referees: Burgos & Lenzue (URU)
8 June; 18:00	1× (yellow card) 3× (suspension)	Report	2× (suspension)	Ginásio Poliesportivo Henrique Villaboim, São Paulo; Attendance: 120; Referees: Burgos & Lenzue (URU)

=== Group 2 ===
Pos	Team	Pld	W	D	L	GF	GA	GD	Pts	Qualification
1	(Brazil) Nacional Handebol Clube	2	2	0	0	66	56	+10	4	Semifinals
2	(Uruguay) Club Atlético Goes	2	1	0	1	61	61	0	2	5–8th place semifinals
3	(Argentina) Ferro Carril Oeste	2	0	0	2	57	67	−10	0	9–12th place semifinals

Source: Handball SCA

6 June; 16:00	Club Atlético Goes (Uruguay)	29–31	(Brazil) Nacional Handebol Clube	Ginásio Poliesportivo Henrique Villaboim, São Paulo; Attendance: 221; Referees: Geraldello & Marquez (BRA)
6 June; 16:00	Grieco & Scarrone 7	(11–16)	De Fraga 7	Ginásio Poliesportivo Henrique Villaboim, São Paulo; Attendance: 221; Referees: Geraldello & Marquez (BRA)
6 June; 16:00	2× (suspension) 1× (red card)	Report	1× (yellow card) 4× (suspension) 1× (red card)	Ginásio Poliesportivo Henrique Villaboim, São Paulo; Attendance: 221; Referees: Geraldello & Marquez (BRA)

7 June; 16:00	Nacional Handebol Clube (Brazil)	35–27	(Argentina) Ferro Carril Oeste	Ginásio Poliesportivo Henrique Villaboim, São Paulo; Attendance: 120; Referees: S. Correa & Conberse (ARG)
7 June; 16:00	Almeida 14	(16–12)	Ponce 11	Ginásio Poliesportivo Henrique Villaboim, São Paulo; Attendance: 120; Referees: S. Correa & Conberse (ARG)
7 June; 16:00	3× (suspension)	Report	3× (suspension)	Ginásio Poliesportivo Henrique Villaboim, São Paulo; Attendance: 120; Referees: S. Correa & Conberse (ARG)

8 June; 14:00	Ferro Carril Oeste (Argentina)	30–32	(Uruguay) Club Atlético Goes	Ginásio Poliesportivo Henrique Villaboim, São Paulo; Attendance: 145; Referees: B. Correa & R. Correa (BRA)
8 June; 14:00	Ponce 9	(16–15)	Barreiro 8	Ginásio Poliesportivo Henrique Villaboim, São Paulo; Attendance: 145; Referees: B. Correa & R. Correa (BRA)
8 June; 14:00	1× (suspension)	Report	1× (yellow card) 1× (suspension)	Ginásio Poliesportivo Henrique Villaboim, São Paulo; Attendance: 145; Referees: B. Correa & R. Correa (BRA)

=== Group 3 ===
Pos	Team	Pld	W	D	L	GF	GA	GD	Pts	Qualification
1	(Brazil) EC Pinheiros (H)	2	2	0	0	73	36	+37	4	Semifinals
2	(Uruguay) Scuola Italiana di Montevideo	2	1	0	1	47	41	+6	2	5–8th place semifinals
3	(Chile) Leonas Balonmano	2	0	0	2	31	74	−43	0	9–12th place semifinals

Source: Handball SCA
(H) Hosts

6 June; 18:00	Scuola Italiana di Montevideo (Uruguay)	27–15	(Chile) Leonas Balonmano	Ginásio Poliesportivo Henrique Villaboim, São Paulo; Attendance: 150; Referees: Rueda & Petrone (ARG)
6 June; 18:00	Duarte 5	(8–10)	Macaya 8	Ginásio Poliesportivo Henrique Villaboim, São Paulo; Attendance: 150; Referees: Rueda & Petrone (ARG)
6 June; 18:00	1× (yellow card) 3× (suspension)	Report	1× (yellow card) 1× (suspension)	Ginásio Poliesportivo Henrique Villaboim, São Paulo; Attendance: 150; Referees: Rueda & Petrone (ARG)

7 June; 20:00	Leonas Balonmano (Chile)	16–47	(Brazil) EC Pinheiros	Ginásio Poliesportivo Henrique Villaboim, São Paulo; Attendance: 550; Referees: Rueda & Petrone (ARG)
7 June; 20:00	Macaya 6	(6–22)	Dos Santos 11	Ginásio Poliesportivo Henrique Villaboim, São Paulo; Attendance: 550; Referees: Rueda & Petrone (ARG)
7 June; 20:00	1× (suspension)	Report	1× (yellow card) 1× (suspension)	Ginásio Poliesportivo Henrique Villaboim, São Paulo; Attendance: 550; Referees: Rueda & Petrone (ARG)

8 June; 20:00	EC Pinheiros (Brazil)	26–20	(Uruguay) Scuola Italiana di Montevideo	Ginásio Poliesportivo Henrique Villaboim, São Paulo
8 June; 20:00		(15–11)		Ginásio Poliesportivo Henrique Villaboim, São Paulo
8 June; 20:00		Report		Ginásio Poliesportivo Henrique Villaboim, São Paulo

=== Group 4 ===
Pos	Team	Pld	W	D	L	GF	GA	GD	Pts	Qualification
1	(Brazil) Clube Português	2	2	0	0	76	41	+35	4	Semifinals
2	(Argentina) Jockey Club Córdoba	2	1	0	1	55	59	−4	2	5–8th place semifinals
3	(Argentina) Club Mendoza de Regatas	2	0	0	2	41	72	−31	0	9–12th place semifinals

Source: Handball SCA

6 June; 14:00	Jockey Club Córdoba (Argentina)	31–24	(Argentina) Club Mendoza de Regatas	Ginásio Poliesportivo Henrique Villaboim, São Paulo; Attendance: 100; Referees: B. Correa & R. Correa (BRA)
6 June; 14:00	Olmos 7	(16–12)	3 players 5	Ginásio Poliesportivo Henrique Villaboim, São Paulo; Attendance: 100; Referees: B. Correa & R. Correa (BRA)
6 June; 14:00	2× (suspension)	Report	1× (yellow card) 2× (suspension)	Ginásio Poliesportivo Henrique Villaboim, São Paulo; Attendance: 100; Referees: B. Correa & R. Correa (BRA)

7 June; 18:00	Club Mendoza de Regatas (Argentina)	17–41	(Brazil) Clube Português	Ginásio Poliesportivo Henrique Villaboim, São Paulo; Attendance: 190; Referees: Geraldello & Marquez (BRA)
7 June; 18:00	Molina 4	(11–20)	De Lima 8	Ginásio Poliesportivo Henrique Villaboim, São Paulo; Attendance: 190; Referees: Geraldello & Marquez (BRA)
7 June; 18:00	2× (suspension)	Report	1× (suspension)	Ginásio Poliesportivo Henrique Villaboim, São Paulo; Attendance: 190; Referees: Geraldello & Marquez (BRA)

8 June; 16:00	Clube Português (Brazil)	35–24	(Argentina) Jockey Club Córdoba	Ginásio Poliesportivo Henrique Villaboim, São Paulo; Attendance: 10; Referees: Godoy & Magalhaes (BRA)
8 June; 16:00	Menezes 7	(17–13)	Haro 5	Ginásio Poliesportivo Henrique Villaboim, São Paulo; Attendance: 10; Referees: Godoy & Magalhaes (BRA)
8 June; 16:00	3× (suspension)	Report	1× (suspension)	Ginásio Poliesportivo Henrique Villaboim, São Paulo; Attendance: 10; Referees: Godoy & Magalhaes (BRA)

== Knockout stage ==
=== Bracket ===
9–12th place semifinals
3. G1	(Chile) Ovalle Balonmano	30
3. G2	(Argentina) Ferro Carril Oeste	33
3. G3	(Chile) Leonas Balonmano	24
3. G4	(Argentina) Club Mendoza de Regatas	16

Eleventh place
3. G2	(Argentina) Ferro Carril Oeste	30
3. G3	(Chile) Leonas Balonmano	26
Ninth place
3. G1	(Chile) Ovalle Balonmano	33
3. G4	(Argentina) Club Mendoza de Regatas	21

5–8th place semifinals
2. G3	(Uruguay) Scuola Italiana di Montevideo	30
2. G4	(Argentina) Jockey Club Córdoba	22
2. G1	(Brazil) Ser Unimed Sorocaba	27
2. G2	(Uruguay) Club Atlético Goes	29

Fifth place
2. G3	(Uruguay) Scuola Italiana di Montevideo	27
2. G2	(Uruguay) Club Atlético Goes	25
Seventh place
2. G4	(Argentina) Jockey Club Córdoba	26
2. G1	(Brazil) Ser Unimed Sorocaba	29

Semifinals
1. G1	(Argentina) River Plate	30
1. G2	(Brazil) Nacional Handebol Clube	17
1. G3	(Brazil) EC Pinheiros	21
1. G4	(Brazil) Clube Português	15

Finals
1. G1	(Argentina) River Plate	26
1. G3	(Brazil) EC Pinheiros	29
Third place
1. G1	(Brazil) Nacional Handebol Clube	23
1. G1	(Brazil) Clube Português	30

=== 9–12th place semifinals ===
9 June; 9:00	Ovalle Balonmano (Chile)	30–33	(Argentina) Ferro Carril Oeste	Ginásio Poliesportivo Henrique Villaboim, São Paulo; Attendance: 200; Referees: B. Correa & R. Correa (BRA)
9 June; 9:00	Muller 8	(13–16)	Ponce 10	Ginásio Poliesportivo Henrique Villaboim, São Paulo; Attendance: 200; Referees: B. Correa & R. Correa (BRA)
9 June; 9:00	1× (yellow card) 1× (suspension)	Report	2× (suspension)	Ginásio Poliesportivo Henrique Villaboim, São Paulo; Attendance: 200; Referees: B. Correa & R. Correa (BRA)

9 June; 11:00	Leonas Balonmano (Chile)	24–16	(Argentina) Club Mendoza de Regatas	Ginásio Poliesportivo Henrique Villaboim, São Paulo; Attendance: 230; Referees: Geraldello & Marquez (BRA)
9 June; 11:00	Macaya 10	(13–9)	Reta & Andreades 3	Ginásio Poliesportivo Henrique Villaboim, São Paulo; Attendance: 230; Referees: Geraldello & Marquez (BRA)
9 June; 11:00	1× (suspension)	Report	1× (yellow card) 5× (suspension)	Ginásio Poliesportivo Henrique Villaboim, São Paulo; Attendance: 230; Referees: Geraldello & Marquez (BRA)

=== 5–8th place semifinals ===
9 June; 13:00	Scuola Italiana di Montevideo (Uruguay)	30–22	(Argentina) Jockey Club Córdoba	Ginásio Poliesportivo Henrique Villaboim, São Paulo; Attendance: 120; Referees: Rueda & Petrone (ARG)
9 June; 13:00	Grosso & Trelles 6	(16–11)	Haro 6	Ginásio Poliesportivo Henrique Villaboim, São Paulo; Attendance: 120; Referees: Rueda & Petrone (ARG)
9 June; 13:00	4× (suspension)	Report	1× (yellow card) 4× (suspension)	Ginásio Poliesportivo Henrique Villaboim, São Paulo; Attendance: 120; Referees: Rueda & Petrone (ARG)

9 June; 15:00	Ser Unimed Sorocaba (Brazil)	27–29	(Uruguay) Club Atlético Goes	Ginásio Poliesportivo Henrique Villaboim, São Paulo; Attendance: 290; Referees: Godoy & Magalhaes (BRA)
9 June; 15:00	Do Nascimiento 7	(14–12)	Barreiro & Iglesias 9	Ginásio Poliesportivo Henrique Villaboim, São Paulo; Attendance: 290; Referees: Godoy & Magalhaes (BRA)
9 June; 15:00	1× (yellow card) 7× (suspension) 1× (red card)	Report	2× (yellow card) 3× (suspension)	Ginásio Poliesportivo Henrique Villaboim, São Paulo; Attendance: 290; Referees: Godoy & Magalhaes (BRA)

=== Semifinals ===
9 June; 17:00	River Plate (Argentina)	30–17	(Brazil) Nacional Handebol Clube	Ginásio Poliesportivo Henrique Villaboim, São Paulo; Attendance: 730; Referees: Burgos & Lenzue (URU)
9 June; 17:00	Carletti 10	(12–11)	Morcineck 5	Ginásio Poliesportivo Henrique Villaboim, São Paulo; Attendance: 730; Referees: Burgos & Lenzue (URU)
9 June; 17:00	1× (suspension)	Report	4× (suspension) 1× (red card)	Ginásio Poliesportivo Henrique Villaboim, São Paulo; Attendance: 730; Referees: Burgos & Lenzue (URU)

9 June; 20:00	EC Pinheiros (Brazil)	21–15	(Brazil) Clube Português	Ginásio Poliesportivo Henrique Villaboim, São Paulo; Attendance: 1101; Referees: S. Correa & Conberse (ARG)
9 June; 20:00	Ferreira 7	(12–7)	De Lima 4	Ginásio Poliesportivo Henrique Villaboim, São Paulo; Attendance: 1101; Referees: S. Correa & Conberse (ARG)
9 June; 20:00	1× (yellow card) 2× (suspension)	Report	4× (suspension)	Ginásio Poliesportivo Henrique Villaboim, São Paulo; Attendance: 1101; Referees: S. Correa & Conberse (ARG)

=== Eleventh place game ===
10 June; 19:00	Ovalle Balonmano (Chile)	33–21	(Argentina) Club Mendoza de Regatas	Ginásio Poliesportivo Henrique Villaboim, São Paulo; Attendance: 451; Referees: Rueda & Petrone (ARG)
10 June; 19:00	Muller 14	(14–13)	Andreades 5	Ginásio Poliesportivo Henrique Villaboim, São Paulo; Attendance: 451; Referees: Rueda & Petrone (ARG)
10 June; 19:00	1× (yellow card) 1× (suspension)	Report	1× (suspension)	Ginásio Poliesportivo Henrique Villaboim, São Paulo; Attendance: 451; Referees: Rueda & Petrone (ARG)

=== Ninth place game ===
10 June; 11:00	Ferro Carril Oeste (Argentina)	30–26	(Chile) Leonas Balonmano	Ginásio Poliesportivo Henrique Villaboim, São Paulo; Attendance: 222; Referees: Geraldello & Marquez (BRA)
10 June; 11:00	Bartolomeo 7	(14–14)	Macaya 8	Ginásio Poliesportivo Henrique Villaboim, São Paulo; Attendance: 222; Referees: Geraldello & Marquez (BRA)
10 June; 11:00	1× (yellow card) 2× (suspension) 1× (red card)	Report	1× (yellow card) 1× (suspension)	Ginásio Poliesportivo Henrique Villaboim, São Paulo; Attendance: 222; Referees: Geraldello & Marquez (BRA)

=== Seventh place game ===
10 June; 13:00	Jockey Club Córdoba (Argentina)	26–29	(Brazil) Ser Unimed Sorocaba	Ginásio Poliesportivo Henrique Villaboim, São Paulo; Attendance: 110; Referees: Burgos & Lenzue (URU)
10 June; 13:00	Haro 7	(13–16)	Ferreira 6	Ginásio Poliesportivo Henrique Villaboim, São Paulo; Attendance: 110; Referees: Burgos & Lenzue (URU)
10 June; 13:00	1× (suspension)	Report	1× (suspension)	Ginásio Poliesportivo Henrique Villaboim, São Paulo; Attendance: 110; Referees: Burgos & Lenzue (URU)

=== Fifth place game ===
10 June; 15:00	Scuola Italiana di Montevideo (Uruguay)	27–25	(Uruguay) Club Atlético Goes	Ginásio Poliesportivo Henrique Villaboim, São Paulo; Attendance: 130; Referees: S. Correa & Conberse (ARG)
10 June; 15:00	Duarte 9	(13–13)	Scarrone 6	Ginásio Poliesportivo Henrique Villaboim, São Paulo; Attendance: 130; Referees: S. Correa & Conberse (ARG)
10 June; 15:00	1× (yellow card) 4× (suspension)	Report	1× (yellow card) 2× (suspension)	Ginásio Poliesportivo Henrique Villaboim, São Paulo; Attendance: 130; Referees: S. Correa & Conberse (ARG)

=== Third place game ===
10 June; 17:00	Nacional Handebol Clube (Brazil)	23–30	(Brazil) Clube Português	Ginásio Poliesportivo Henrique Villaboim, São Paulo; Attendance: 230; Referees: Godoy & Magalhaes (BRA)
10 June; 17:00	Almeida 7	(9–10)	De Lima 7	Ginásio Poliesportivo Henrique Villaboim, São Paulo; Attendance: 230; Referees: Godoy & Magalhaes (BRA)
10 June; 17:00	2× (suspension)	Report	2× (yellow card)	Ginásio Poliesportivo Henrique Villaboim, São Paulo; Attendance: 230; Referees: Godoy & Magalhaes (BRA)

=== Final ===
10 June
20:00
River Plate (Argentina)
26–29 (ET)
(Brazil) EC Pinheiros
Ginásio Poliesportivo Henrique Villaboim, São Paulo
Attendance: 1200
Referees: B. Correa & R. Correa (BRA)
3 players 7
(10–13)
3 players 5
3× (suspension)
Report
1× (suspension)

FT: 24–24 ET: 2–5

== Final standing ==
Rank	Team
Gold medal	(Brazil) EC Pinheiros
Silver medal	(Argentina) River Plate
Bronze medal	(Brazil) Clube Português
4	(Brazil) Nacional Handebol Clube
5	(Uruguay) Scuola Italiana di Montevideo
6	(Uruguay) Club Atlético Goes
7	(Brazil) Ser Unimed Sorocaba
8	(Argentina) Jockey Club Córdoba
9	(Argentina) Ferro Carril Oeste
10	(Chile) Leonas Balonmano
11	(Chile) Ovalle Balonmano
12	(Argentina) Club Mendoza de Regatas

2023 South and Central American Women's Club Champions

EC Pinheiros
Second title

Team roster: Julia Rodrigues, Maria dos Santos, Gabriella Mendes, Rafaela Costa, Nicole Damascena, Barbarah Monteiro, Fernanda Couto, Rebeca Araujo, Jessica Antunes, Maryanna Ferreira, Mayara Moura, Rafaela Faure, Jessica de Oliveira, Micaela da Silva, Livia Oliveira, Lívia Ventura.
Staff: Alex Aprile, Mauricio Antonucci, Carla Antonucci, Ana Romancini, Lorenzo Capelli.
