= Viktor Sulčič =

Argentine architect (1895–1973)

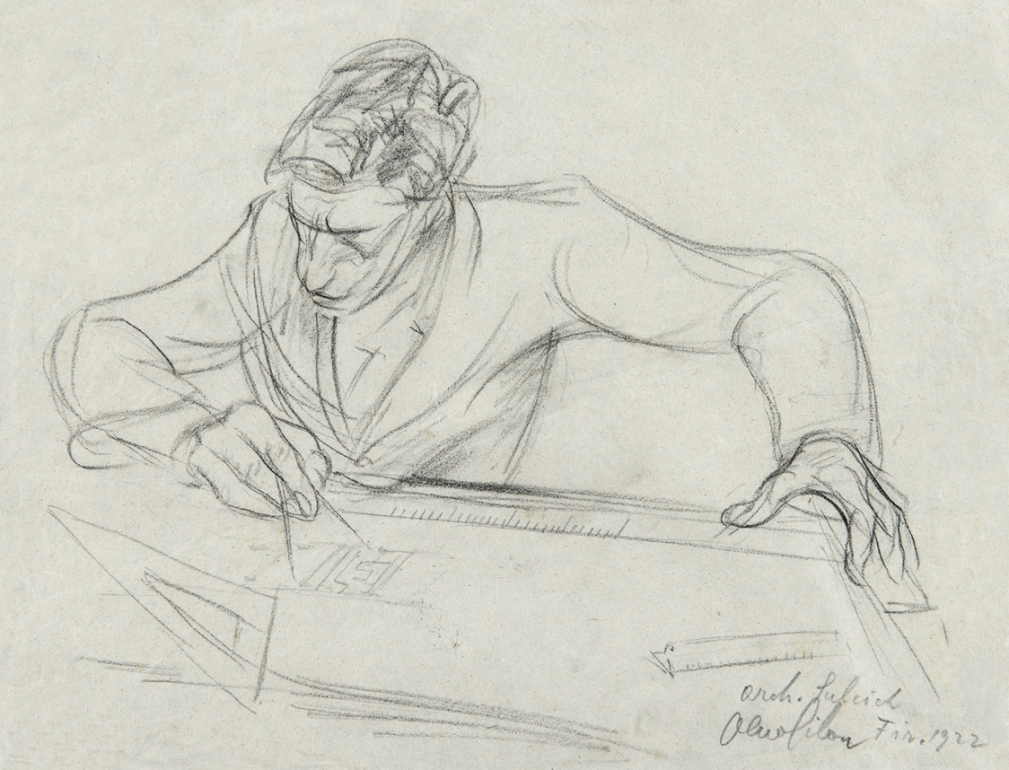
Drawing of Sulčič in 1922

Viktor Sulčič (1895–1973), also known in Spanish as Víctor or Victorio Sulcic, was an architect of Slovene ethnic origin, best known for his contributions to Art Deco architecture in Argentina. He is most renowned as one of the designers of the iconic La Bombonera stadium in Buenos Aires, home of the Boca Juniors football club.

He was born on January 14, 1895, in Santa Croce (in Slovene: Križ), a village near Trieste, which at the time was part of the Austro-Hungarian Empire. After World War I, the territory was annexed by Italy, and Sulčič became an Italian citizen.

He studied architecture in Florence and Bologna, before emigrating to Argentina, where he built a successful and lasting architectural legacy.

Other works by Viktor Sulcic include a collection of water colours depicting South American landscapes and poems written in Spanish.

Viktor Sulcic was married to Anna Kiselicki, a piano teacher, native of Vranjevo near Novi Bečej in Serbia. They had two sons: Fedor and Hector Igor Sulcic.

He died in 1973 in Buenos Aires.
