= La Bombonera =

Football stadium in Buenos Aires, Argentina

Alberto José Armando Stadium
- Estadio Alberto José Armando
- La Bombonera (The Chocolate Box)
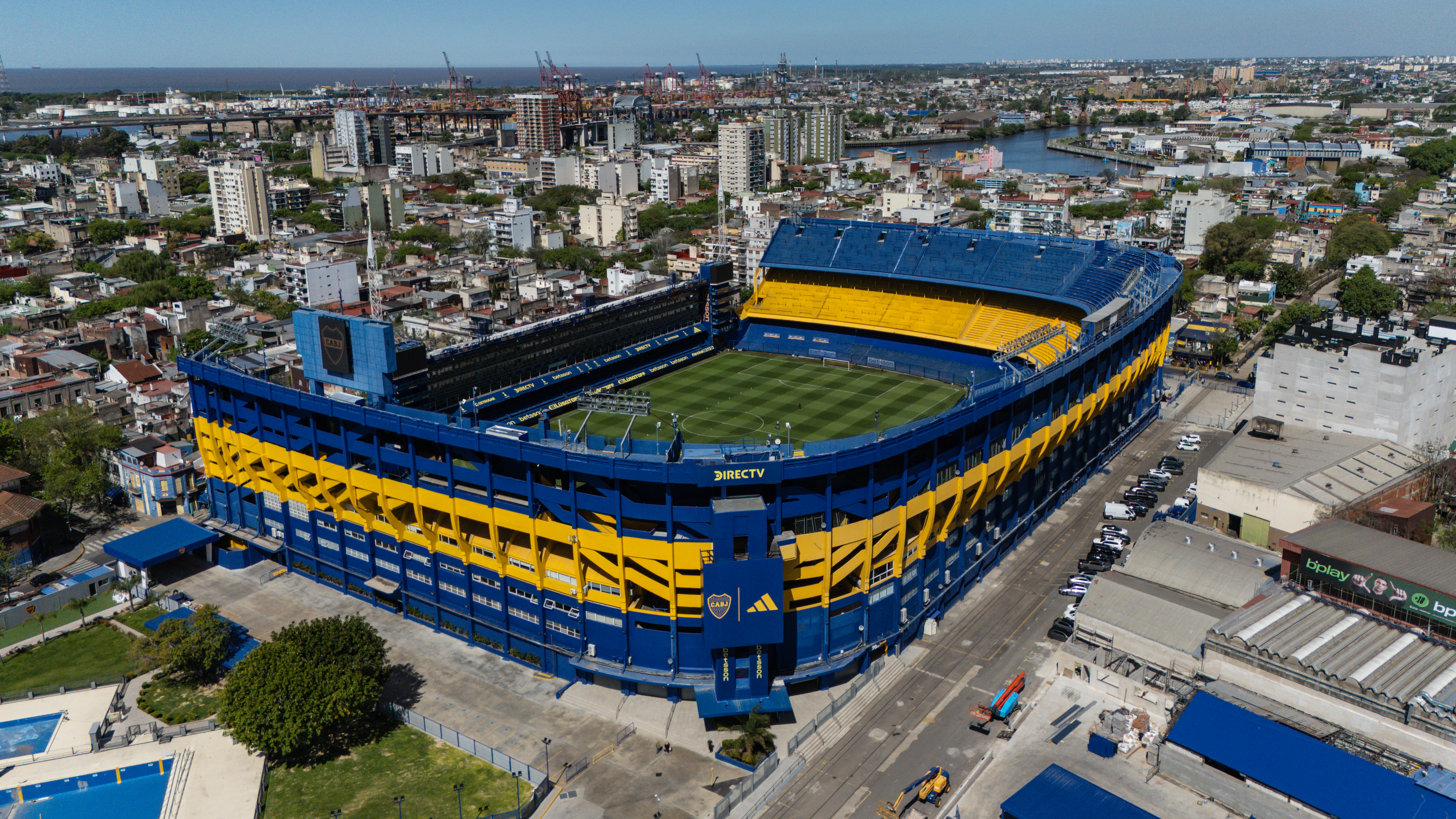
- View of the stadium in 2025
- Interactive map of Alberto José Armando Stadium
- Full name: Estadio Alberto José Armando
- Former names: Estadio de Boca Juniors (1940–1986); Estadio Camilo Cichero (1986–2000)
- Location: Brandsen 805 CP 1161, La Boca, Buenos Aires, Argentina
- Coordinates: 34°38′8.34″S 58°21′52.74″W
- Owner: Boca Juniors
- Capacity: 58,305
- Surface: Grass
- Record attendance: 57,395
- Field size: 105 x 68 m
- Current use: Football

Construction
- Groundbreaking: 18 February 1938
- Built: 1938–40
- Opened: 25 May 1940; 86 years ago
- Renovated: 1995–96
- Architects: José Luis Delpini, Viktor Sulčič, Raúl Bes

Tenants
- Boca Juniors (1940–present); Argentina national football team (1956–1978, 1992–present)

Website
- bocajuniors.com.ar/labombonera

La Bombonera (Spanish pronunciation: [la βomboˈneɾa]; lit. 'The Chocolate Box', named after its resemblance to a chocolate box, per Viktor Sulčič), officially known as Estadio Alberto José Armando (Spanish pronunciation: [esˈtaðjo alˈβeɾto xoˈse aɾˈmando]; lit. 'Alberto José Armando Stadium', named after Alberto Armando), is an association football stadium in La Boca neighbourhood, Buenos Aires, Argentina that is the home of the Boca Juniors team.

It is widely regarded as one of the most iconic stadiums in the world due to its design, the club's history and its intense atmosphere, and it has been host to many noteworthy players in football, including Diego Maradona, Lionel Messi, Alfredo Di Stéfano, and Pelé. It has been declared of public interest by the government of Argentine capital Buenos Aires.

The stadium is also used as a concert venue. Past performers at La Bombonera have included Lenny Kravitz, Elton John, James Blunt, the Bee Gees, and the Backstreet Boys. The unusual shape of the stadium give it excellent acoustics.

== History ==
=== Background ===
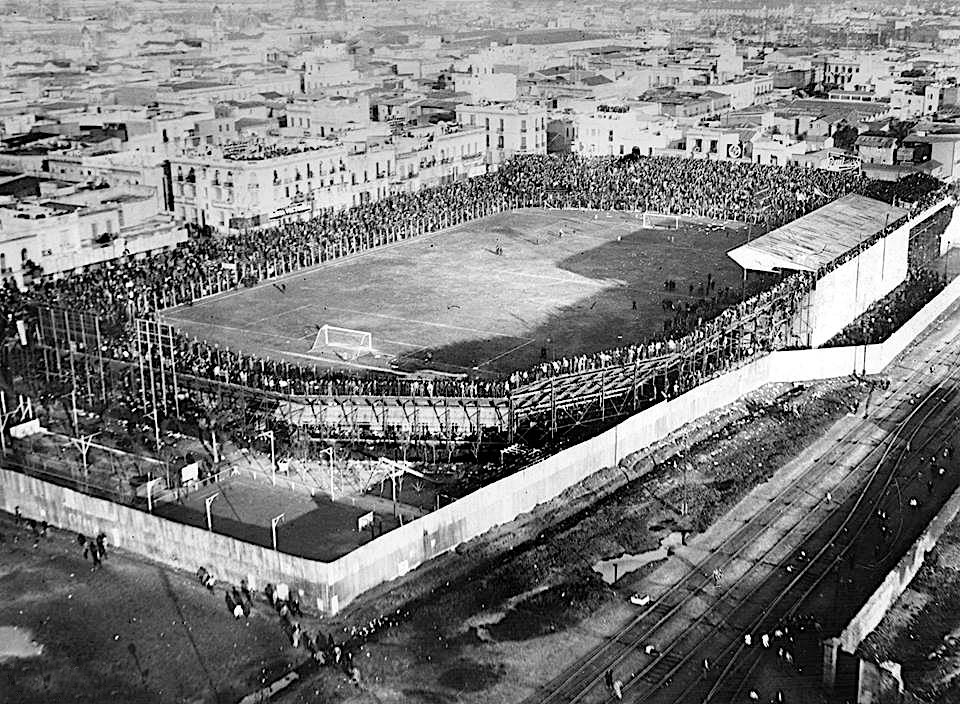
The old Boca Juniors stadium in Brandsen and Del Crucero, where Boca Juniors played from 1924 to 1938

In 1921, following several years of financial difficulties and lack of funds, Boca Juniors put out a fundraising drive to raise money for their next stadium. The drive was successful, with Boca raising enough money to initially rent, then buy, a new stadium. The land they chose, which would become La Bombonera, was owned by Ferro Carril del Sud, which was originally used as a shunting yard, giving them a home for the foreseeable future. The land was also close to railway lines that led out of the city.

Prior to La Bombonera, Boca Juniors had used several locations before settling on their current ground on Brandsen. The club's first ground had been located in Dársena Sur of the old Buenos Aires port (currently Puerto Madero) and Isla Demarchi before moving to Brandsen and Del Crucero (currently Del Valle Iberlucea) streets in 1924. The club built a stadium there. This would be their home venue until the construction of La Bombonera at the same location.

In 1931, Boca Juniors' steering committee (led by president Ruperto Molfino) acquired the lands from the Municipality of Buenos Aires for A$ 2,200,000. Three years later, the club published a call for tenders to build its new stadium. The project was finally granted to the Delpini-Sulcic-Bes architectural office, which would also design the Mercado de Abasto, finished in 1934, later recyled in the 1990s as a shopping mall renamed Abasto Shopping.

The old stadium (still with wooden grandstands) was used for the last time on April 10, 1938, before being demolished to build the new stadium at the same location. While La Bombonera was under construction, Boca Juniors played their home games at the Ferro Carril Oeste stadium.

=== Opening and later refurbishments ===
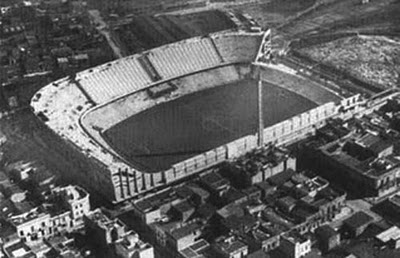
The stadium under construction.

The stadium finally opened on May 25, 1940, with a friendly match between Boca and San Lorenzo, which the home side won 2–0 with both goals scored by Ricardo Alarcón. Due to the fact that the stadium did not have a lighting system, the game only lasted 70' (two halves of 35' each).

The first official game at the new stadium was on June 2, 1940, when Boca Juniors beat Newell's Old Boys 2–0. Ricardo Alarcón (who had scored in the opening game v. San Lorenzo) scored the first official goal at the new venue.

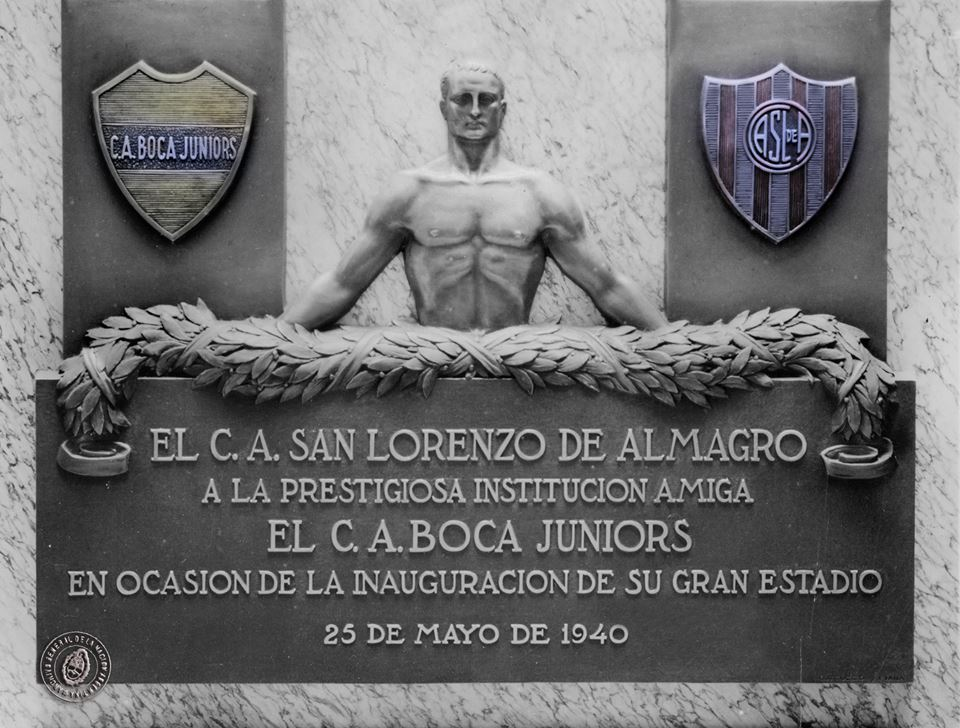
Plaque donated by San Lorenzo de Almagro on the occasion of the inauguration of La Bombonera, May 1940.

After the stadium was inaugurated, the club continued to introduce refurbishments to expand its capacity. As a result, on November 16, 1941, a second tier was opened on the north side of the stadium, near Casa Amarilla train station. The grandstand was named "Natalio Pescia" in honour of one of the key players in Boca Juniors' history. In 1949, the club decided to add a third tier, as well as a lighting system. All of those works were completed in 1953; this third tier gave the stadium its enduring nickname, La Bombonera. Boca Juniors celebrated with a friendly match vs. Yugoslav club NK Hajduk Split, which ended 1-1.

Since then, La Bombonera was not remodeled until 1996 when the presidency of Mauricio Macri decided to expand its capacity to 57,500 spectators. This included the addition in 1996 of a fourth tier; and a wing housing a press area, VIP boxes, a museum, and offices. Works included the demolition of the lateral boxes on Del Valle Iberlucea street, replacing them by a small stand and new and modern boxes (with metallic structure) placed over there. The stadium's exterior was later decorated with works by painters Rómulo Macció and Pérez Celis. The "new" Bombonera was reinaugurated with a friendly match v. Universidad de Chile, against whom Boca Juniors won 3–1.

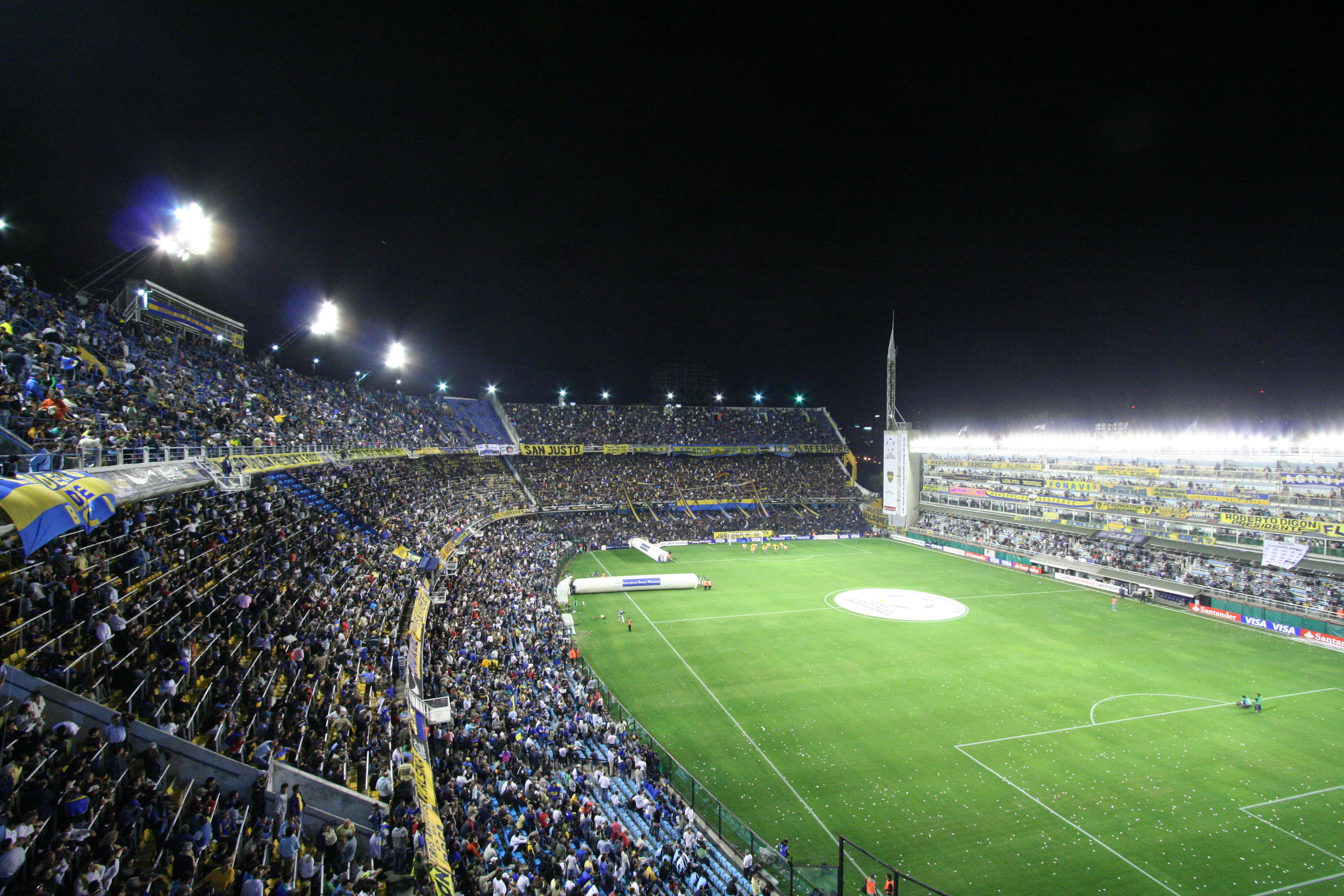
La Bombonera during a night game v. Colo Colo, with the refurbished boxes at right, March 2008.

An electronic screen was installed in 2008, making Boca Juniors' stadium the third venue in Argentina with this technology, after the stadiums of Vélez Sársfield and River Plate. At the beginning of 2012, more than 500 seats were replaced and other 500 were added, part of the building of four additional boxes.

The stadium was named on April 20, 1986, by team President Antonio Alegre in honor of Camilo Cichero, a former team president under whose tenure work on La Bombonera began. It was renamed on December 27, 2000, by team President Mauricio Macri in honor of Alberto Armando, team president during its resurgence during the 1960s as well as a former business partner of his father Francisco Macri.

=== Character ===
The stadium is notable for the artwork and murals both inside and around the stadium. One of the murals inside the stadium honors the different divisions within the club and many of the clubs legendary players and figures, including Diego Maradona. The mural is made of tile painted blue and yellow and metal busts and sculptures. Several murals outside the stadium depict the lives of residents of La Boca, usually dockworkers, and people wearing Boca Juniors jerseys and apparel.

The stadium is noted for its tendency to shake with heavy fan activity during matches. According to writer Christopher Thomas Gaffney, “La Bombonera does not shake, it beats.” The stadium is also renowned for its location within La Boca, with spectators able to see the dockyards on the Atlantic coast from the highest reaches of the stadium. The stadium is one of many in the city proper of Buenos Aires, with football stadiums far outnumbering other sporting grounds, such as polo grounds and race tracks.

== Origin of the name ==
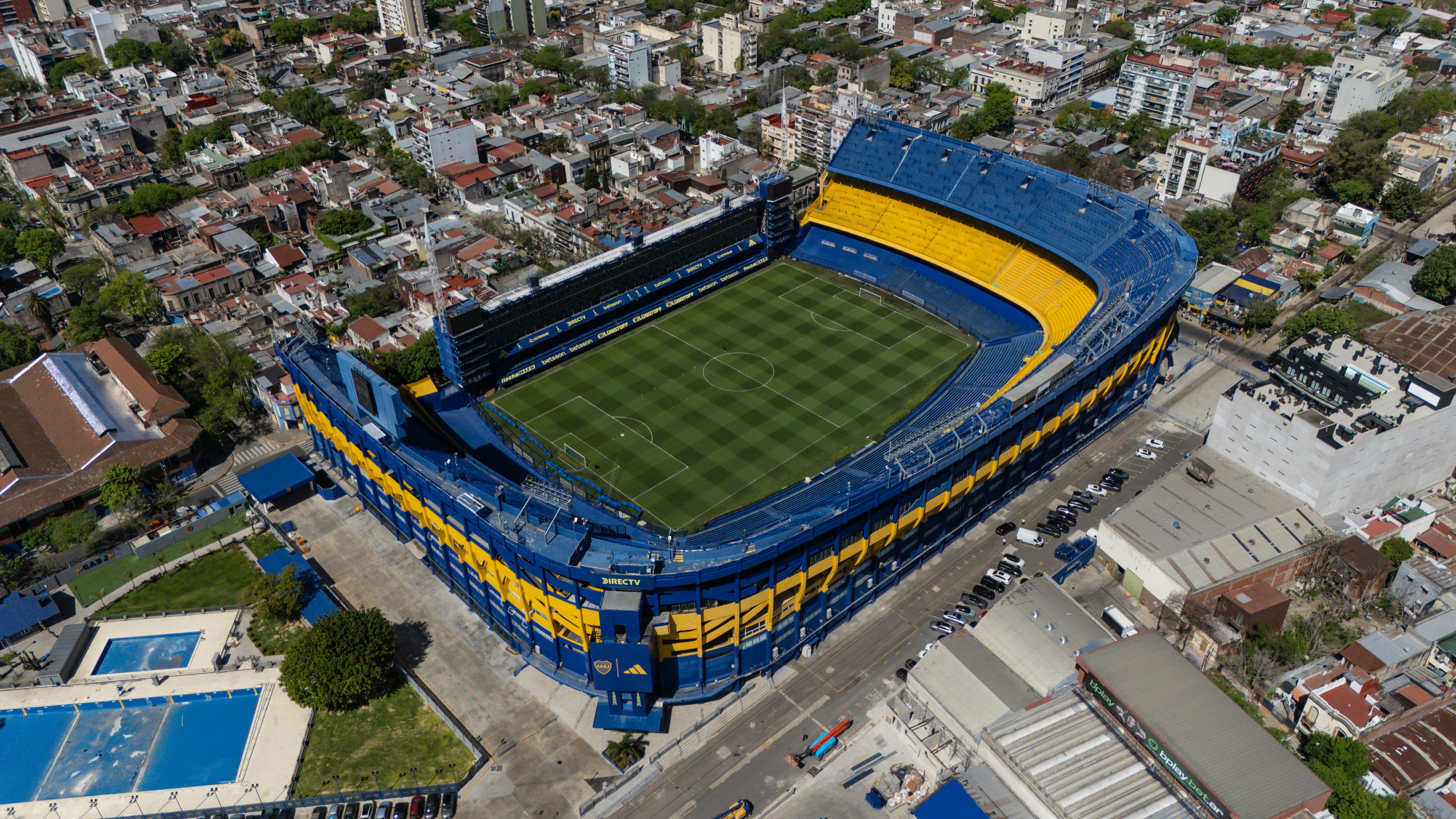
Aerial shot of La Bombonera.

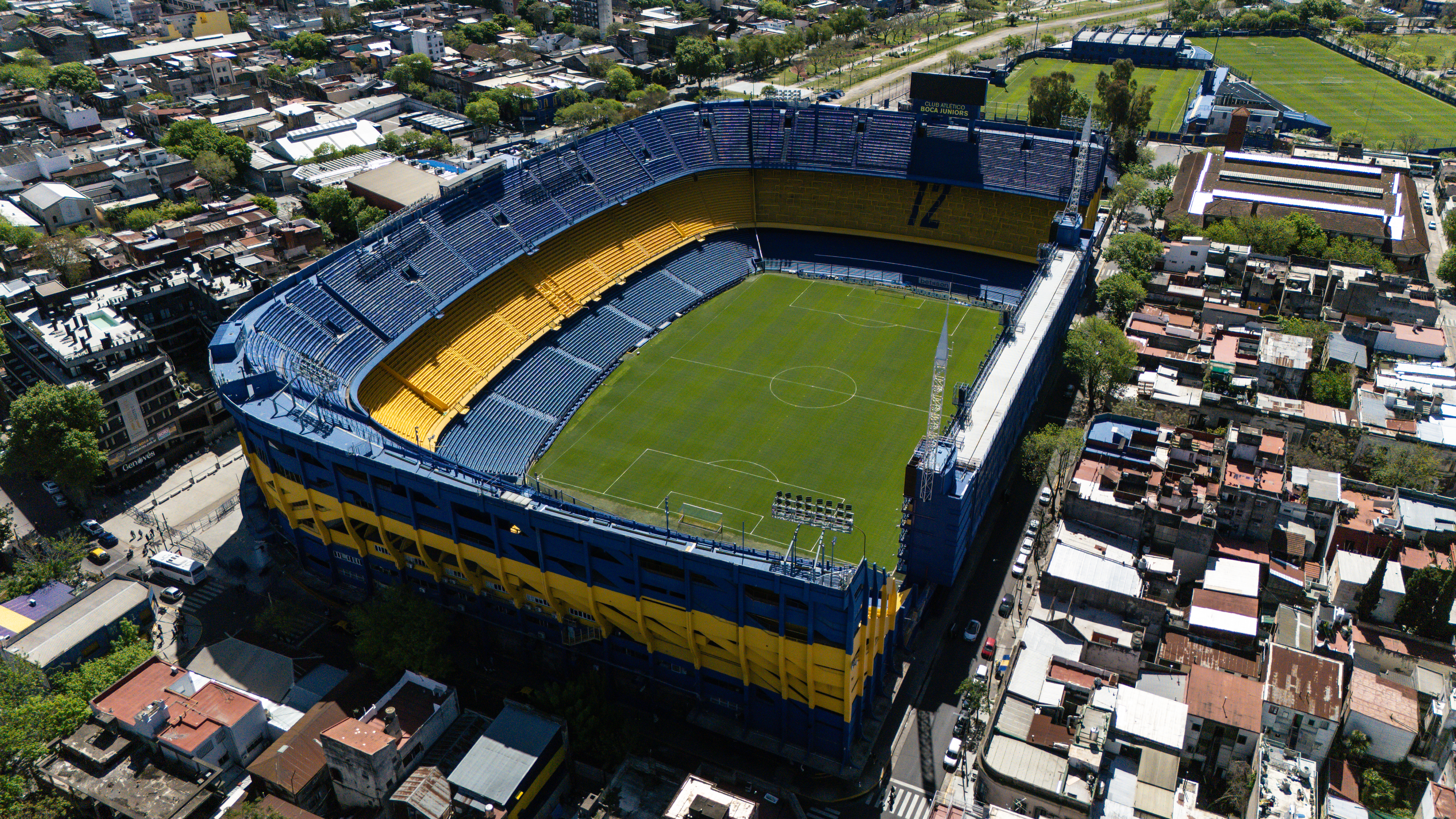
Aerial shot of La Bombonera.

The stadium is popularly known as La Bombonera. It is said that the nickname came about while architect Viktor Sulčič was designing the stadium. On occasion of Sulčič's birthday, a friend gave him a box of chocolates as a gift. After that, Sulčič used to take the box to project meetings with engineer Delpine and other persons that he collaborated with the project to show them that the box shape was very like the stadium they were designing. Since then, the stadium would be known as La Bombonera ("box of chocolates" in Spanish) and that name has remained to present days. In fact, the opening day (May 25, 1940) the stadium was named that way even by the club executives.

There are other stories or myths about the origin of the nickname. One of them tells that Delpini projected the stands with a highly vertical grade of inclination to host 100,000 persons (which was the first project). The shape of the stands looked like the carts used to collect horses dung in the streets of Buenos Aires. Other version credits journalist Hugo Marini or broadcaster Joaquín Carballo Serantes (aka) "Fioravanti" for the Bombonera nickname.

Despite its distinguished nickname, the first official denomination came on April 20, 1986, when it was named "Camilo Cichero" in commemoration of the president under whose tenure the stadium was projected and built. That same day Boca Juniors defeated Talleres de Córdoba by 4–2. Nevertheless, president Mauricio Macri decided to change the stadium's name to "Alberto J. Armando", honoring long-time president of the club during two periods (1954–55, 1960–80).

== Facilities ==
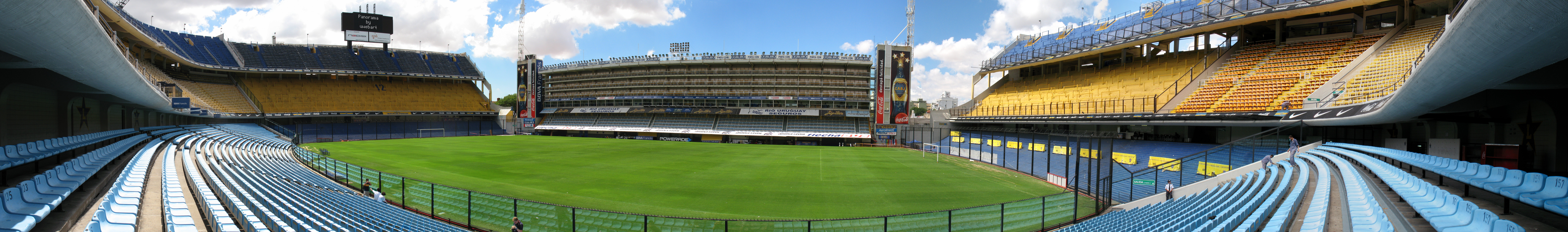
Panoramic view of Estadio Alberto J. Armando, mostly known as La Bombonera, taken in 2012.

La Bombonera currently has a gross capacity of 58,305, which results in around 57,200 seats being available for games,. The club's popularity makes tickets hard to get, especially for the Superclásico derby against River Plate.

Out of its capacity of 49,000, there are 37,538 seats, 2,780 in boxes, and 8,682 standing. Both its interior and exterior are lined with a number of murals painted by the artist Pérez Celis depicting many of the club's legendary players and aspects of the district's culture, such as the lives of Italian immigrants.

In 1996, a small stand was built on the fourth side, which had been largely open until then, except for some VIP boxes.

Diego Maradona, who played for and supported Boca Juniors, had his own executive box at the stadium.

There are three parking lots at the stadium for members.

== Argentina national team on La Bombonera ==
The national team has played several games in La Bombonera, including qualifying matches to the FIFA World Cup. The squad played the most games since the 1920s to the mid-1970s. Since the Estadio Monumental of River Plate was completely refurbished for the 1978 WC, the Argentine Football Association fixtured the majority of Argentina's home games at that venue. That decision was based on the Monumental higher capacity and modern facilities in comparison with La Bombonera.

Playing at Boca Juniors Stadium, Argentina was only defeated in two games, having played a total of 27 matches, winning 18 and losing two, with seven ties. The squad scored 67 goals and only conceded 27. Some of the official and friendly games played by Argentina at the stadium (as of 14 November 2024) are listed below:

Game status	Date	Opponent	Score
Copa Lipton	14 Nov 1956	Uruguay	1–1
1958 FIFA WCQ	20 Oct 1957	Chile	4–0
1970 FIFA WCQ	24 Aug 1969	Bolivia	1–0
1970 FIFA WCQ	31 Aug 1969	Peru	2–2
Friendly	8 Jan 1971	France	3–4
Copa R. Castilla	27 Jul 1973	Peru	3–1
1974 FIFA WCQ	9 Sep 1973	Bolivia	4–0
1974 FIFA WCQ	7 Oct 1973	Paraguay	3–1
Friendly	27 Feb 1977	Hungary	5–1
Friendly	29 May 1977	Poland	3–1
Friendly	5 Jun 1977	Germany	1–3
Friendly	12 June 1977	England	1–1
Friendly	18 Jun 1977	Scotland	1–1
Friendly	26 Jun 1977	France	0–0
Copa F. Bogado	24 Aug 1977	Paraguay	2–1
Copa R. Castilla	19 Mar 1978	Peru	2–1
Friendly	29 Mar 1978	Bulgaria	3–1
Friendly	5 Apr 1978	Romania	2–0
Friendly	19 Apr 1978	Republic of Ireland	3–1
Friendly	3 May 1978	Uruguay	3–0
Friendly	26 Nov 1992	Poland	2–0
1998 FIFA WCQ	16 Nov 1997	Colombia	1–1
2012 SA	21 Nov 2012	Brazil	2–1
2018 FIFA WCQ	5 Oct 2017	Peru	0–0
Friendly	29 May 2018	Haiti	4–0
2022 FIFA WCQ	8 Oct 2020	Ecuador	1–0
2022 FIFA WCQ	25 Mar 2022	Venezuela	3–0
2026 FIFA WCQ	16 Nov 2023	Uruguay	0–2
2026 FIFA WCQ	19 Nov 2024	Peru	1–0
Friendly	27 March 2026	Mauritania	2–1
Friendly	31 March 2026	Zambia	2–0

== Boca Museum ==
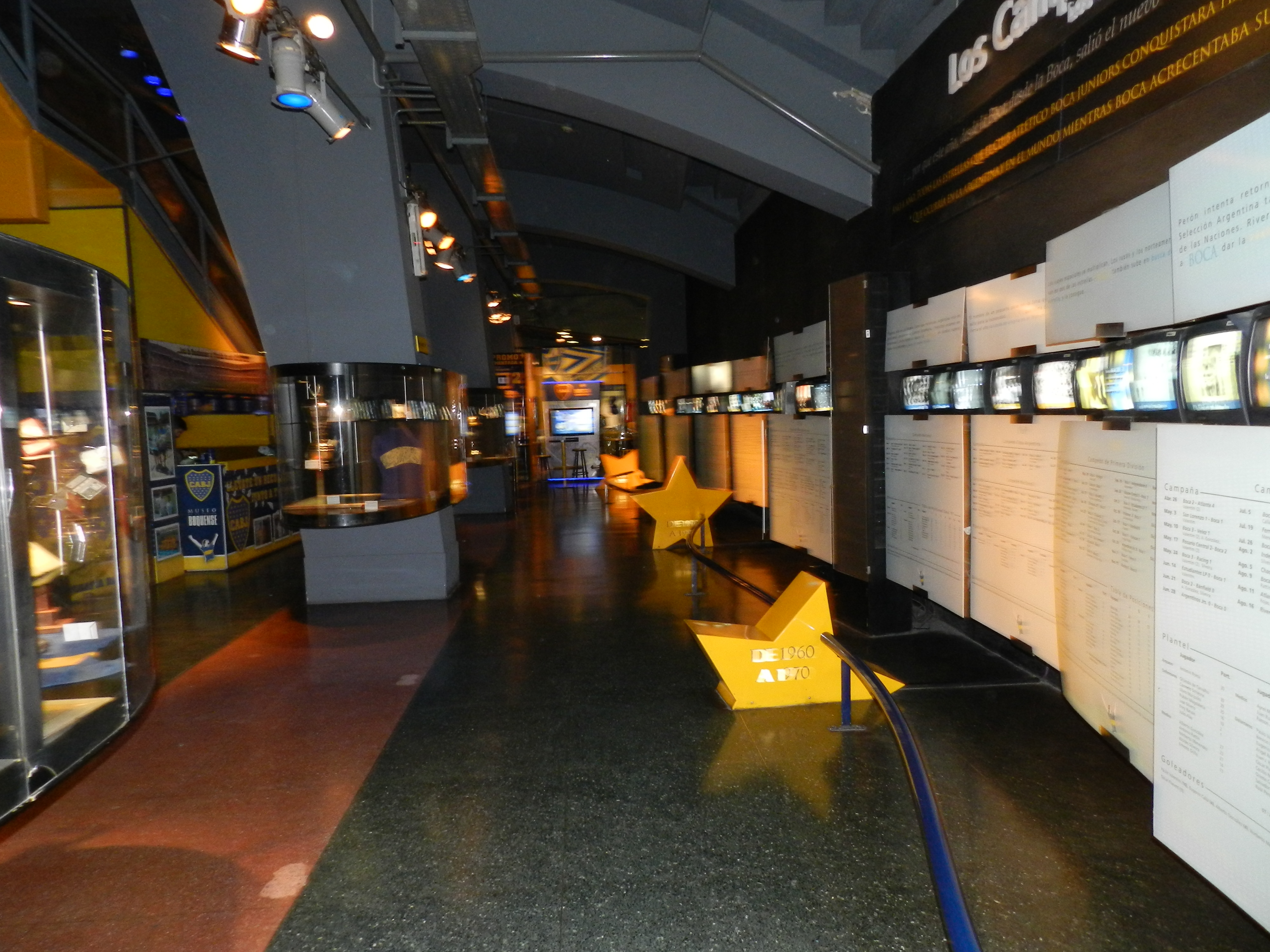
Hall of the Boca Juniors Museum

The Passion of Boca Juniors Museum (Spanish: Museo de la Pasión Boquense) was opened in 2001 during Mauricio Macri's administration. It is located within the stadium, just below the grandstands. The museum was built on two floors and chronicles the club's rise from 1905 (the year the club was established) to the present day.

One of the exhibits in the museum is a giant football with 360-degree footage of the club's fans and players at a match. The museum also includes a Hall of fame and a large mural of Diego Maradona. Also included are non-football items, such as the specially commissioned blue and gold guitar played by Lenny Kravitz when he performed at La Bombonera in 2005.

A giant statue of Boca Juniors' all-time top scorer, Martín Palermo, was unveiled in 2011. Other former players who have statues honoring them are Diego Maradona and Román Riquelme A total of seven Boca Juniors idols have been honored by the club with their respective monuments; they are Guillermo Barros Schelotto, Angel Clemente Rojas, Silvio Marzolini and Antonio Rattín, apart from Maradona, Palermo, and Riquelme.

Carlos Bianchi was the first Boca Juniors manager to be honored with a statue when a monument to his figure was unveiled in October 2016. Bianchi won nine titles during his two tenures at the club (1998–2003), becoming the most winning manager in Boca Juniors' history. Under Bianchi's coaching, the team also set a record of 40 matches unbeaten, the biggest since Argentine football became professional in 1931.

== Redevelopment ==
There are planned improvements for the stadium, including measures to ease crowd congestion, the use of new technology in the stadium, and improved corporate facilities. These include:

- Main gate, museum, and megastore: Work is planned to be done on the main access to the stadium at 805 Brandsen, which will include the construction of a megastore, and to then connect the main access with the store and the club's museum.
- Third tier: remodeling work to install further seating and improve spectator comfort.
- Stadium gates: Building work to improve access and prevent crowd congestion is underway. The first phase focuses on improving access to the executive boxes and premium seats. In addition, new software and hardware will improve access control with regard to safety and quickness to prevent crowd congestion.
- Creation of a corporate area: Businesses will have an area in the stadium with VIP service. One section in the second tier is being redesigned with two executive boxes and more comfortable seating. The service will also provide businesses with season tickets to allow them to invite clients. It also includes transportation, museum visits, and catering services.

== In film ==
- Some scenes of the 1969 film Invasión were shot in the deserted stadium.
- The Danish film SuperClásico, has a part filmed in the stadium.
- The Hong Kong film Happy Together, has a part filmed in the stadium.

== See also ==
- List of football stadiums in Argentina
- List of association football stadiums by capacity
