= Estadio Provincial Juan Gilberto Funes =

Football stadium in La Punta, Argentina

Coordinates: 33°11′36″S 66°18′48″W

Juan Gilberto Funes Provincial Stadium
- Estadio Provincial Juan Gilberto Funes
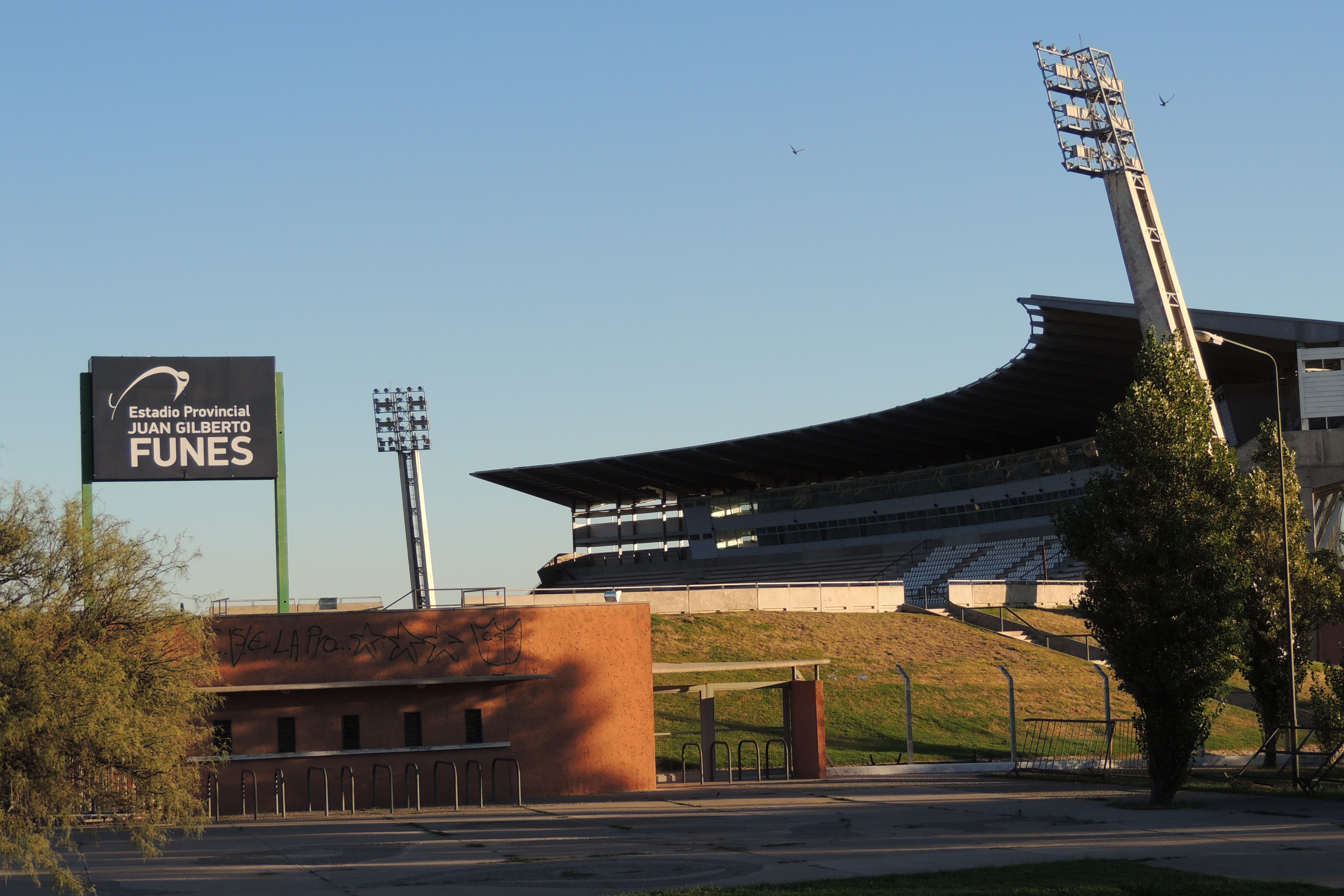
- Interactive map of Juan Gilberto Funes Provincial Stadium
- Address: La Punta; Argentina
- Owner: Province of San Luis
- Capacity: 15,062
- Surface: Grass
- Field size: 104 x 71 m
- Current use: Football matches

Construction
- Built: 2001–2003
- Opened: 27 March 2003; 23 years ago

The Estadio Provincial Juan Gilberto Funes is a football stadium located in the city of La Punta in San Luis Province, Argentina. It is named for former player Juan Gilberto Funes.

== History ==
The stadium was inaugurated on 27 March 2003 with a match between Independiente and Vélez Sarsfield. It served host to the 2013 South American U-17 Championship. It has also hosted the 2013 Supercopa Argentina and the 2013 Copa Campeonato between River Plate and San Lorenzo. It has been used for several matches in the Copa Argentina.

The stadium has also hosted two friendlies of the Argentina women's national football team.

== See also ==
- List of football stadiums in Argentina
