= Arella Jácome =

Ecuadorian footballer (born 2004)

Personal information
- Full name: Arella Jácome Agnalt
- Date of birth: 20 August 2004 (age 22)
- Place of birth: Quito, Ecuador
- Height: 1.64 m (5 ft 5 in)
- Position: Attacking midfielder

Team information
- Current team: LDU Quito

Youth career
- 2014–2019: LDU Quito

College career
| Years | Team | Apps | (Gls) |
| 2024– | Ohio State Buckeyes | 0 | (0) |

Senior career*
| Years | Team | Apps | (Gls) |
| 2018–2023 | LDU Quito | 20 | (9) |
| 2021 | → El Nacional (loan) | 0 | (0) |

International career^{‡}
| 2021– | Ecuador | 2 | (0) |
- * Club domestic league appearances and goals as of 28 April 2022 ‡ National team caps and goals as of 28 April 2022

Arella Jácome Agnalt (born 20 August 2004) is an Ecuadorian footballer who plays as a midfielder for the Ecuador women's national team.

== Early life ==
The eldest of three children, Jácome was born to an Ecuadorian father, former Ecuador international footballer Santiago Jácome, and a Norwegian mother, Groanette Agnalt. She began playing football aged seven. At ten years old, she was enrolled in a football school run by LDU Quito, where her father serves as sporting director.

== Club career ==
In 2018, Jácome was signed to the L.D.U. Quito senior team by manager Jeny Herrera.

In March 2021, Jácome joined C.D. El Nacional on loan for the duration of the team's 2020 Copa Libertadores Femenina campaign in Argentina.

In February 2022, Jácome underwent surgery for a torn anterior cruciate ligament in her left leg.

In December 2023, Jácome departed L.D.U. Quito to enroll at Ohio State University on a full scholarship.
