= Wilmary Argüelles =

Venezuelan association football player

Personal information
- Full name: Wilmary Carieli Argüelles Camacaro
- Date of birth: 7 April 2001 (age 25)
- Height: 1.58 m (5 ft 2 in)
- Position: Midfielder

Team information
- Current team: CD Argual
- Number: 16

Senior career*
| Years | Team | Apps | (Gls) |
| -2020 | Caracas F.C. | | |
| 2020-2023 | UD Tenerife B | 51 | (3) |
| 2020-2022 | UD Tenerife | 5 | |
| 2023-2025 | Leonas de Managua | | |
| 2025 | Barcelona S.C. | | |
| 2025- | CD Argual | | |

International career
| 2020 | Venezuela U20 | 4 | (3) |
| 2022 | Venezuela | 1 | |
- * Club domestic league appearances and goals

Wilmary Argüelles (born 7 April 2001) is a Venezuelan professional footballer who plays as a midfielder for Spanish Canarias Preferente club CD Argual and the Venezuela women's national team.
