= Kareylen Capdevilla =

Venezuelan footballer (born 2001)

Personal information
- Full name: Kareylen Skarleth Capdevilla Briceño
- Date of birth: 3 September 2001 (age 25)
- Place of birth: San Felipe, Yaracuy, Venezuela
- Height: 1.54 m (5 ft 1 in)
- Position: Defender

Senior career*
| Years | Team | Apps | (Gls) |
- Yaracuyanos
- Arroceros de Calabozo
- Estudiantes de Guárico
| 2021 | Villarreal | 5 | (0) |

International career^{‡}
| 2020 | Venezuela U20 | 3 | (2) |
| 2021– | Venezuela | 1 | (0) |
- * Club domestic league appearances and goals as of 20 February 2021 ‡ National team caps and goals as of 8 April 2021.

Kareylen Skarleth Capdevilla Briceño (born 3 September 2001) is a Venezuelan footballer who plays as a defender for the Venezuela women's national team.

== Early life ==
Capdevilla was born in San Felipe, Yaracuy.

== Club career ==
Capdevilla has played for Yaracuyanos FC, Arroceros de Calabozo and Estudiantes de Guárico in Venezuela and for Villarreal CF in Spain.

== International career ==
Capdevilla made her senior debut for Venezuela on 8 April 2021.
