= Estadio San Juan del Bicentenario =

Football stadium in San Juan, Argentina

Coordinates: 31.6119°S 68.5275°W

San Juan of Bicentennial Stadium
- Estadio San Juan del Bicentenario
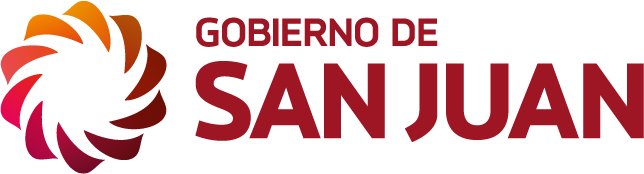

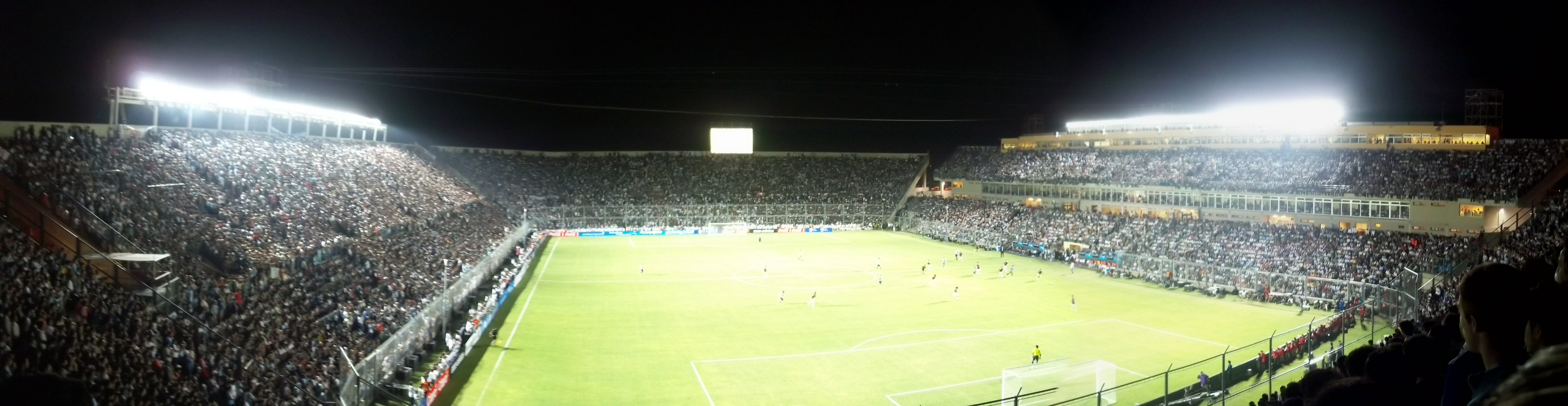
- Night view of the stadium in 2011
- Interactive map of San Juan of Bicentennial Stadium
- Address: Av. San Juan-Mendoza s/n Pocito, San Juan, Argentina
- Owner: San Juan Province
- Capacity: 25,286
- Surface: Grass
- Field size: 105 x 68 m

Construction
- Opened: 16 March 2011; 15 years ago
- Renovated: 2021
- Cost: AR$ 86 million

Tenants
- San Martín; Sportivo Desamparados; Unión (Villa Krause); Juventud Alianza; Argentina national football team (2011–present); Argentina national rugby team (2011–present)

Estadio San Juan del Bicentenario is a football stadium located in the Pocito Department of San Juan Province, Argentina. Owned by the Government of San Juan Province, it currently hosts the home matches of local clubs San Martín, Sportivo Desamparados, and others. The stadium also served as venue for the 2011 Copa América. Estadio San Juan del Bicentenario was designed with a capacity of 25,000 spectators and required an investment of AR$86 million.

Apart from football matches, the stadium has also hosted rugby union and field hockey matches.

== History ==
Works started in March 2009, with a total of 500 workers employed. Works extended for 24 months. The stadium was supposed to be inaugurated in May, 2010, to commemorate the 200 years of the May Revolution. Delays, however, have meant that the stadium was inaugurated on March 16, 2011, with the Argentina vs Venezuela friendly match which Argentina won by a score of 4–1, in front of an attendance of 30,000. That year, the stadium hosted group stage and quarter-final matches in the 2011 Copa América.

In March 2013, an additional field was also inaugurated at a cost of AR$ 9 million. The field has similar measures (105 x 68 m) and six lighting towers which allow it to host matches at night.

In 2012, Estadio del Bicentenario hosted the first final of the relaunched Copa Argentina, where Boca Juniors beat Racing 21. One year later, the stadium was one of the two venues of the 2013 South American Youth Championship and hosted Group B in the first stage.

In 2018, it again hosted the Argentina national team, this time for a 2018 FIFA World Cup qualification (CONMEBOL) match against Colombia, which Argentina won 3–0.

In 2023, the stadium hosted matches of the 2023 FIFA U-20 World Cup finals.

== Sporting events ==
=== 2011 Copa América ===
Date	Group	Team 1	Score	Team 2
4 Jul	Group C	Uruguay	1–1	Peru
4 Jul	Group C	Chile	2–1	Mexico
17 Jul	Quarter-finals	Chile	1–2	Venezuela

=== 2023 FIFA U-20 World Cup ===
Date	Group	Team 1	Score	Team 2
20 May	Group B	United States	1–0	Ecuador
20 May	Group B	Fiji	0–4	Slovakia
23 May	Group B	United States	3–0	Fiji
23 May	Group B	Ecuador	2–1	Slovakia
26 May	Group B	Slovakia	0–2	United States
26 May	Group A	New Zealand	0–5	Argentina
31 May	Round of 16	Colombia	5–1	Slovakia
31 May	Round of 16	Argentina	0–2	Nigeria
5 Jun	Quarter-finals	Israel	3–2 (a.e.t.)	Brazil
5 Jun	Quarter-finals	Colombia	1–3	Italy

=== FIFA World Cup qualification ===
Date	Team #1	Res.	Team #2	Qualifier for	Att.
15 Nov 2016	Argentina	3–0	Colombia	2018 FIFA World Cup	25,000
16 Nov 2021	Argentina	0–0	Brazil	2022 FIFA World Cup	25,000

=== Rugby union ===
Date	Event	Home team	Score	Away team	Ref.
10 Jun 2017	England tour	Argentina	34–38	England	
9 Jun 2018	Wales tour	Argentina	10–23	Wales	
13 Aug 2022	Rugby Championship	Argentina	48–17	Australia	
11 Jul 2026	Nations Championship	Argentina	35–21	Wales	

== See also ==
- List of football stadiums in Argentina

Preceded by various venues in Venezuela	Copa América; Venue; 2011	Succeeded by various venues in Chile
Preceded by various venues in Poland	FIFA U-20 World Cup; Venue; 2023	Succeeded by TBD
