= Autazes =

Municipality of Amazonas, Brazil

- Municipality
- Flag Coat of arms

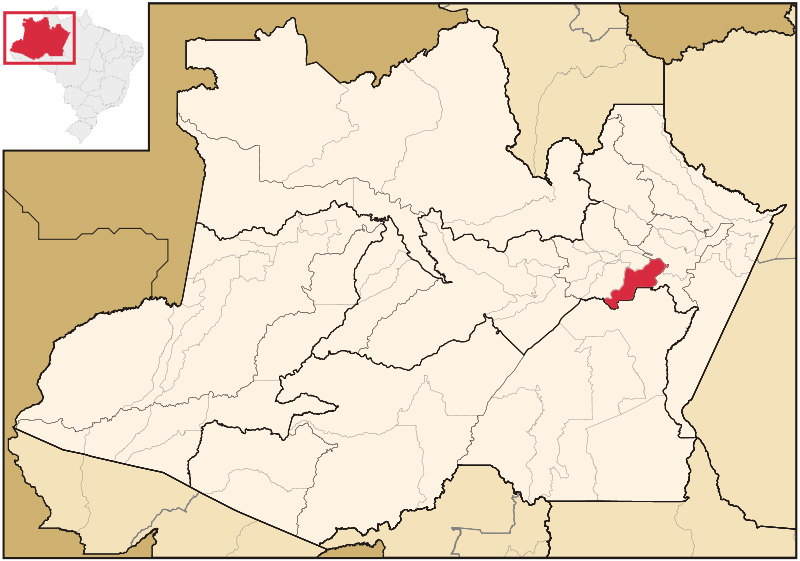
- Location of the municipality inside Amazonas

- Location in Brazil
- Coordinates: 3°34′48″S 59°7′51″W
- Country: Brazil
- Region: North
- State: Amazonas

Area
  - Total: 7,599 km^{2} (2,934 sq mi)

Population (2020)
  - Total: 40,290
  - Density: 5.302/km^{2} (13.73/sq mi)
- Time zone: UTC−4 (AMT)

Autazes is a municipality located in the Brazilian state of Amazonas. Its population was 40,290 (2020) and its area is 7,599 km^{2}. It is located south-east of Manaus, just west of the Madeira River.
