= Jessica Sánchez =

Paraguayan footballer (born 2000)

Personal information
- Full name: Jessica Dahiana Sánchez Cáceres
- Date of birth: 25 November 2000 (age 25)
- Height: 1.67 m (5 ft 6 in)
- Position: Forward

Team information
- Current team: Botafogo

Senior career*
Years	Team	Apps	(Gls)
20??–2020	Olimpia		
2020–	Botafogo	0	(0)

International career^{‡}
2018	Paraguay U20	3	(0)
2019–	Paraguay	1	(0)
- * Club domestic league appearances and goals ‡ National team caps and goals as of 4 October 2019

Jessica Dahiana Sánchez Cáceres (born 25 November 2000) is a Paraguayan footballer who plays as a forward for Brazilian Série A2 club Botafogo de Futebol e Regatas and the Paraguay women's national team.

== International career ==
Sánchez represented Paraguay at the 2018 FIFA U-20 Women's World Cup. She made her senior debut on 4 October 2019 in a 1–1 friendly draw against Venezuela.
