= La Punta, San Luis =

Coordinates: 33°11′01″S 66°18′46″W

La Punta
- Municipality and village
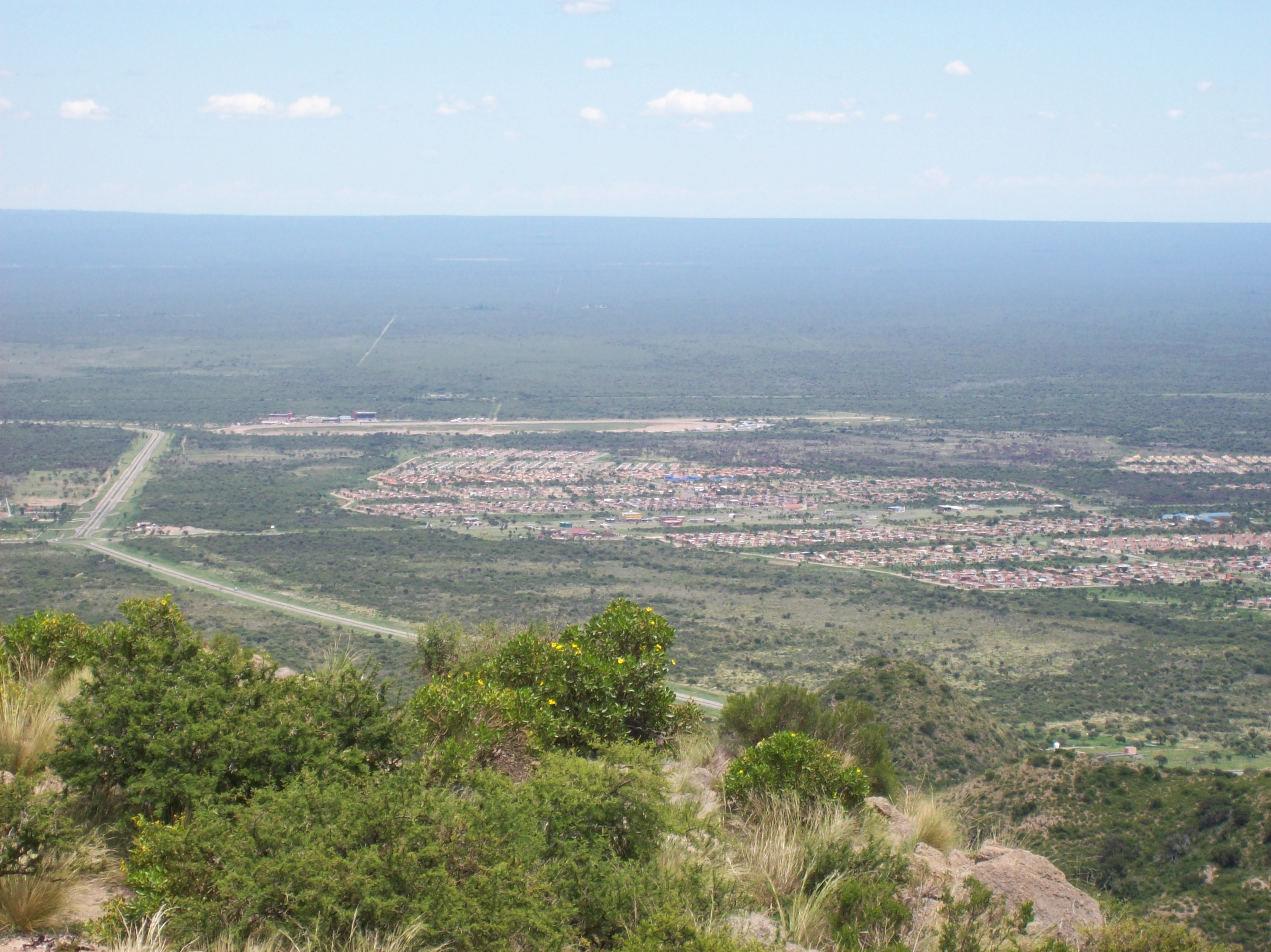

- La Punta
- Country: Argentina
- Province: San Luis
- Department: Juan Martín de Pueyrredón
- Established: 2003

Government
  - Intendente: Rubén Darío Rosas Curi

Population (2022)
  - Total: 21,774
- Time zone: UTC−3 (ART)

La Punta is a village and municipality in San Luis Province in central Argentina.

== History ==
La Punta was founded in March 2003 by Alicia Lemme.

== Sports ==
The Estadio Provincial Juan Gilberto Funes was opened in 2003. It was one of the stadiums used for the 2013 South American U-17 Championship. It has hosted the 2013 Supercopa Argentina and the 2013 Copa Campeonato.

La Punta was one of four cities to bid on hosting the 2019 Pan American Games. La Punta lost the bid to Lima, Peru.
