= 2010 South American Women's Football Championship =

Tournament details
- Host country: Ecuador
- Dates: 4–21 November
- Teams: 10 (from 1 confederation)
- Venues: 7 (in 7 host cities)

Final positions
- Champions: Brazil (5th title)
- Runners-up: Colombia
- Third place: Chile
- Fourth place: Argentina

Tournament statistics
- Matches played: 26
- Goals scored: 93 (3.58 per match)
- Top scorer(s): (Brazil) Marta (9 goals)
- Fair play award: Chile

The 2010 South American Women's Football Championship (Spanish: Campeonato Sudamericano Femenino – Copa América de Selecciones) was the sixth edition of the South American Women's Football Championship, and acted as a qualifier for the 2011 FIFA Women's World Cup and the 2012 Summer Olympics. The tournament was held in Ecuador from 4 to 21 November 2010, after originally being scheduled for 28 October to 14 November 2010.

The top two teams from the final group, Brazil and Colombia, qualified for the 2011 Women's World Cup and the 2012 Summer Olympics. Additionally, the top 4 teams qualified for the 2011 Pan American Games.

== Venues ==
Seven venues in seven cities were used during the tournament.

City	Stadium	Capacity
Ambato	Estadio Bellavista	19,337
Azogues	Estadio Jorge Andrade Cantos	8,500
Cuenca	Estadio Alejandro Serrano Aguilar	20,730
Latacunga	Estadio La Cocha	15,220
Loja	Estadio Federativo Reina del Cisne	14,934
Quito	Estadio Olímpico Atahualpa	40,948
Riobamba	Estadio Olímpico	18,936

== Match officials ==
The following referees were named for the tournament:

- (Argentina) Estela Álvarez
- (Bolivia) Sirley Cornejo
- (Brazil) Ana Karina Marques Valentim Alves
- (Chile) Carolina González
- (Colombia) Adriana Correa
- (Ecuador) Juana Delgado
- (Paraguay) Norma González
- (Peru) Silvia Reyes
- (Uruguay) Gabriela Bandeira
- (Venezuela) Yanina Mujica

== First stage ==
Locations of the 2010 Sudamericano Femenino venues

Matches were played in Latacunga, Ambato and Riobamba (Group A) and Loja, Cuenca and Azogues (Group B).

The tournament features a first round, where the ten teams are divided into two groups of five teams each. The top two teams in the groups advance to a final round, instead of a knockout stage.

The final round was set up in a round-robin format, where each team played one match against each of the other teams within the group. The top two teams in the group qualified for the 2011 FIFA Women's World Cup in Germany and the 2012 Olympic Games football tournament in London. The first-placed team won the tournament.

Three points were awarded for a win, one point for a draw, and zero points for a loss.

When teams finish level of points, the final order determined according to:

1. superior goal difference in all matches
2. greater number of goals scored in all group matches
3. better result in matches between tied teams
4. drawing of lots

=== Group A ===
Pos	Team	Pld	W	D	L	GF	GA	GD	Pts	Qualification
1	Chile	4	3	0	1	9	4	+5	9	Advance to second stage
2	Argentina	4	3	0	1	7	2	+5	9	Advance to second stage
3	Ecuador (H)	4	3	0	1	8	6	+2	9	
4	Bolivia	4	1	0	3	5	11	−6	3	
5	Peru	4	0	0	4	3	9	−6	0	

Source: CONMEBOL
(H) Hosts
4 November 2010
17:00 UTC-5

Argentina	3–0	Bolivia
Ojeda 6', 39' (pen.); Banini 51'	Report

Estadio La Cocha, Latacunga
Attendance: 3,000
Referee: Yanina del Carmen Mujica Camacaro (Venezuela)
4 November 2010
19:00 UTC-5

Ecuador	1–2	Chile
Quintero 42'	Report	Quezada 2'; Salgado 44'

Estadio La Cocha, Latacunga
Referee: Ana Karina Marques Valentim Alves (Brazil)

6 November 2010
17:00 UTC-5

Chile	1–2	Argentina
Lara 84' (pen.)	Report	Pereyra 40', 70'

Estadio Bellavista, Ambato
Referee: Adriana Lucia Correa (Colombia)
6 November 2010
19:00 UTC-5

Ecuador	2–1	Peru
Quinteros 22'; Palacios 78'	Report	Tristán 15'

Estadio Bellavista, Ambato
Referee: Norma Beatriz González Gomez (Paraguay)

8 November 2010
17:00 UTC-5

Chile	3–0	Bolivia
Lara 8'; Zamora 40'; Araya 55'	Report

Estadio Olímpico, Riobamba
Referee: Ana Karina Marques Valentim Alves (Brazil)
8 November 2010
19:00 UTC-5

Argentina	2–0	Peru
González 65'; Blanco 68'	Report

Estadio Olímpico, Riobamba
Attendance: 1,300
Referee: Gabriela Lourdes Bandeira Popich (Uruguay)

10 November 2010
14:00 UTC-5

Peru	1–3	Chile
Chirinos 45'	Report	Aedo 10'; Araya 57', 90'

Estadio Bellavista, Ambato
Referee: Yanina del Carmen Mujica Camacaro (Venezuela)
10 November 2010
16:00 UTC-5

Bolivia	3–4	Ecuador
Loayza 30'; Benavídez 70'; Padilla 87'	Report	Sánchez 45+4', 53'; Freire 68'; Quinteros 73'

Estadio Bellavista, Ambato
Referee: Adriana Lucia Correa (Colombia)

12 November 2010
17:00 UTC-5

Bolivia	2–1	Peru
Loayza 29', 61'	Report	Chirinos 22'

Estadio La Cocha, Latacunga
Referee: Gabriela Lourdes Bandeira Popich (Uruguay)
12 November 2010
19:00 UTC-5

Ecuador	1–0	Argentina
Rodríguez 34'	Report

Estadio La Cocha, Latacunga
Referee: Norma Beatriz González Gomez (Paraguay)

=== Group B ===
Pos	Team	Pld	W	D	L	GF	GA	GD	Pts	Qualification
1	Brazil	4	4	0	0	13	1	+12	12	Advance to second stage
2	Colombia	4	3	0	1	17	2	+15	9	Advance to second stage
3	Paraguay	4	2	0	2	8	6	+2	6	
4	Venezuela	4	1	0	3	5	15	−10	3	
5	Uruguay	4	0	0	4	2	21	−19	0	

Source: CONMEBOL
5 November 2010
17:00 UTC-5

Paraguay	0–3	Colombia
	Report	Domínguez 18'; Usme 46'; Rincón 70'

Estadio Federativo Reina del Cisne, Loja
Referee: Estela Mary Álvarez de Olivera (Argentina)
5 November 2010
19:00 UTC-5

Brazil	4–0	Venezuela
Aline 26', 30'; Cristiane 42'; Renata Costa 60'	Report

Estadio Federativo Reina del Cisne, Loja
Referee: Sirley Cornejo Arana (Bolivia)

7 November 2010
11:00 UTC-5

Venezuela	0–4	Paraguay
	Report	Quintana 49'; Villamayor 56', 59', 80'

Estadio Federativo Reina del Cisne, Loja
Referee: Carolina Patricia Gonzalez Urrutia (Chile)
7 November 2010
13:00 UTC-5

Uruguay	0–4	Brazil
	Report	Cristiane 15' (pen.), 40'; Marta 36', 57'

Estadio Federativo Reina del Cisne, Loja
Referee: Juana del Rocio Delgado Torres (Ecuador)

9 November 2010
14:00 UTC-5

Colombia	5–0	Venezuela
Arias 27'; Rodallega 45'; Peralta 56'; Rincón 58'; Velásquez 73'	Report

Estadio Jorge Andrade, Azogues
Referee: Silvia Elizabeth Reyes Juarez (Peru)
9 November 2010
16:00 UTC-5

Paraguay	4–0	Uruguay
Villamayor 29'; Galeano 38'; Quintana 42'; Vázquez 89' (pen.)	Report

Estadio Jorge Andrade, Azogues
Referee: Sirley Cornejo Arana (Bolivia)

11 November 2010
17:00 UTC-5

Venezuela	5–2	Uruguay
Viso 4', 17'; Quintero 31'; Torres 78'; Altuve 83'	Report	Viera 43'; Birizamberri 66'

Estadio Alejandro Serrano Aguilar, Cuenca
Referee: Juana del Rocio Delgado Torres (Ecuador)
11 November 2010
19:00 UTC-5

Colombia	1–2	Brazil
Muñoz 57'	Report	Cristiane 13'; Marta 28'

Estadio Alejandro Serrano Aguilar, Cuenca
Referee: Estela Mary Álvarez de Olivera (Argentina)

13 November 2010
14:00 UTC-5

Uruguay	0–8	Colombia
	Report	Usme 35' (pen.); Rincón 41', 80'; Castro 45', 84'; Montoya 82'; N. Arias 85'; Vidal 88'

Estadio Alejandro Serrano Aguilar, Cuenca
Referee: Carolina Patricia Gonzalez Urrutia (Chile)
13 November 2010
16:00 UTC-5

Brazil	3–0	Paraguay
Cristiane 18', 36'; Marta 57'	Report

Estadio Alejandro Serrano Aguilar, Cuenca
Referee: Silvia Elizabeth Reyes Juarez (Peru)

== Second stage ==
Pos	Team	Pld	W	D	L	GF	GA	GD	Pts	Qualification
1	Brazil	3	3	0	0	12	1	+11	9	Qualification to 2011 FIFA Women's World Cup and 2012 Summer Olympics
2	Colombia	3	1	1	1	2	6	−4	4	Qualification to 2011 FIFA Women's World Cup and 2012 Summer Olympics
3	Chile	3	0	2	1	2	4	−2	2	
4	Argentina	3	0	1	2	0	5	−5	1	

Source: CONMEBOL
17 November 2010
17:00 UTC-5

Chile	1–1	Colombia
Lara 61'	Report	Rincón 29'

Estadio La Cocha, Latacunga
Referee: Juana del Rocio Delgado Torres (Ecuador)
17 November 2010
19:00 UTC-5

Brazil	4–0	Argentina
Grazielle 25'; Dos Santos 37'; Marta 63'; Cristiane 77'	Report

Estadio La Cocha, Latacunga
Referee: Norma Beatriz González Gomez (Paraguay)

19 November 2010
17:00 UTC-5

Chile	0–0	Argentina
	Report

Estadio La Cocha, Latacunga
Referee: Yanina del Carmen Mujica Camacaro (Venezuela)
19 November 2010
19:00 UTC-5

Brazil	5–0	Colombia
Érika 23'; Grazielle 48'; Marta 69', 87'; Cristiane 82'	Report

Estadio La Cocha, Latacunga
Referee: Gabriela Lourdes Bandeira Popich (Uruguay)

21 November 2010
10:00 UTC-5

Colombia	1–0	Argentina
Vidal 51'	Report

Estadio Olímpico Atahualpa, Quito
Referee: Sirley Cornejo Arana (Bolivia)
21 November 2010
12:00 UTC-5

Chile	1–3	Brazil
Salgado 45'	Report	Daniele 2'; Marta 36', 83'

Estadio Olímpico Atahualpa, Quito

Brazil won the tournament and qualified for the 2011 FIFA Women's World Cup and the 2012 Olympic Games tournament along with runners-up Colombia.

== Awards ==
2010 Sudamericano Femenino winners

Brazil
Fifth title

== Statistics ==
=== Goalscorers ===
9 goals

- (Brazil) Marta

8 goals

- (Brazil) Cristiane

5 goals

- (Colombia) Yoreli Rincón

4 goals

- (Paraguay) Gloria Villamayor

3 goals

- (Bolivia) Palmira Loayza
- (Chile) Karen Araya
- (Chile) Francisca Lara
- (Ecuador) Mónica Quinteros

2 goals

- (Argentina) Andrea Ojeda
- (Argentina) Mercedes Pereyra
- (Brazil) Aline
- (Brazil) Grazielle
- (Chile) Janeth Salgado
- (Colombia) Nataly Arias
- (Colombia) Katerin Castro
- (Colombia) Catalina Usme
- (Colombia) Ingrid Vidal
- (Ecuador) Joshelyn Sánchez
- (Paraguay) Dulce Quintana
- (Peru) Lyana Chirinos
- (Venezuela) Ysaura Viso

1 goal

- (Argentina) Estefanía Banini
- (Argentina) Gimena Blanco
- (Argentina) Eva Nadia González
- (Bolivia) Roxana Benavídez
- (Bolivia) Carla Padilla
- (Brazil) Renata Costa
- (Brazil) Daniele
- (Brazil) Érika
- (Brazil) Rosana
- (Chile) Yanara Aedo
- (Chile) Patricia Quezada
- (Chile) Daniela Zamora
- (Colombia) Paola Domínguez
- (Colombia) Daniela Montoya
- (Colombia) Yuli Muñoz
- (Colombia) Andrea Peralta
- (Colombia) Carmen Rodallega
- (Colombia) Oriánica Velásquez
- (Ecuador) Patricia Freire
- (Ecuador) Valeria Palacios
- (Ecuador) Ingrid Rodríguez
- (Paraguay) Joana Galeano
- (Paraguay) Angélica Vázquez
- (Peru) Miryam Tristán
- (Uruguay) Carolina Birizamberri
- (Uruguay) Paula Viera
- (Venezuela) Oriana Altuve
- (Venezuela) Nayla Quintero
- (Venezuela) Karla Torres

=== Final ranking ===
Pos	Team	Pld	W	D	L	GF	GA	GD	Pts
1	Brazil	7	7	0	0	25	2	+23	21
2	Colombia	7	4	1	2	19	8	+11	13
3	Chile	7	3	2	2	11	8	+3	11
4	Argentina	7	3	1	3	7	7	0	10
Eliminated in the first round
5	Ecuador	4	3	0	1	8	6	+2	9
6	Paraguay	4	2	0	2	8	6	+2	6
7	Bolivia	4	1	0	3	5	11	−6	3
8	Venezuela	4	1	0	3	5	15	−10	3
9	Peru	4	0	0	4	3	9	−6	0
10	Uruguay	4	0	0	4	2	21	−19	0
