= Francisca Lara =

Chilean footballer (born 1990)

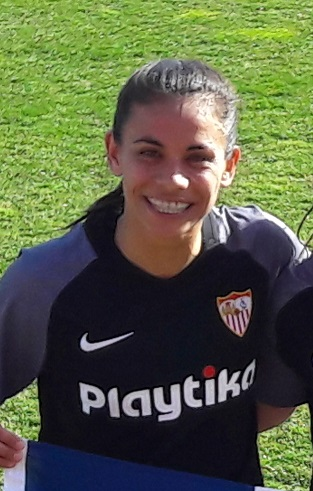
- Lara playing for Spanish club Sevilla FC

Personal information
- Full name: Francisca Alejandra Lara Lara
- Date of birth: 29 July 1990 (age 36)
- Place of birth: San Fernando, Chile
- Height: 1.64 m (5 ft 5 in)
- Position: Midfielder

Senior career*
Years	Team	Apps	(Gls)
2008–2009	Ferroviarios		
2010	Coquimbo Unido		
2011	Cobreloa		
2012–2017	Colo-Colo		
2017–2018	Sporting de Huelva	26	(5)
2018–2020	Sevilla	28	(0)
2020–2021	Le Havre	18	(1)
2021–2024	Villarreal	61	(2)
2024–2025	Dépor ABANCA	20	(2)

International career^{‡}
2010–	Chile	59	(20)
Medal record
Women's football
Representing Chile
South American Games
Silver medal – second place	2014 Santiago	Team
- * Club domestic league appearances and goals as of 20 April 2023 ‡ National team caps and goals as of 17 June 2019

Francisca Alejandra Lara Lara (born 29 July 1990), informally known as Pancha Lara, is a Chilean professional footballer who plays as a midfielder for the Chile women's national team.

== Club career ==
In July 2020, Lara moved to France and joined Le Havre.

In the second half of 2024, she signed with Dépor ABANCA from Villarreal.

== International career ==
Twenty-year-old Lara was named in Chile's 20-player squad for the 2010 South American Women's Football Championship in Ecuador. She scored two goals at the 2018 Copa América Femenina, where Chile qualified to a FIFA Women's World Cup for the first time in its history.

She also was a member of the Chile squad that won the silver medal at the 2014 South American Games.

=== International goals ===
Scores and results list Chile's goal tally first

No.	Date	Venue	Opponent	Score	Result	Competition
1	6 November 2010	Estadio Bellavista, Ambato, Ecuador	Argentina	1–2	1–2	2010 South American Women's Football Championship
2	8 November 2010	Estadio Olímpico, Riobamba, Ecuador	Bolivia	1–0	3–0	2010 South American Women's Football Championship
3	17 November 2010	Estadio La Cocha, Latacunga, Ecuador	Colombia	1–1	1–1	2010 South American Women's Football Championship
4	22 October 2011	Estadio Omnilife, Guadalajara, Mexico	Trinidad and Tobago	1–0	3–0	2011 Pan American Games
5	12 September 2014	Estadio Federativo Reina del Cisne, Loja, Ecuador	Argentina	1–0	1–0	2014 Copa América Femenina
6	16 September 2014	Estadio Alejandro Serrano Aguilar, Cuenca, Ecuador	Bolivia	1–0	3–0	2014 Copa América Femenina
7	20 September 2014	Estadio Jorge Andrade, Azogues, Ecuador	Paraguay	1–1	2–3	2014 Copa América Femenina
8	12 April 2018	Estadio La Portada, La Serena, Chile	Peru	3–0	5–0	2018 Copa América Femenina
9	22 April 2018	Estadio La Portada, La Serena, Chile	Argentina	4–0	4–0	2018 Copa América Femenina

== Honours ==
Chile

- South American Games Silver medal: 2014
