= 2010 in Brazilian football =

Football in Brazil
- Season: 2010

The following article presents a summary of the 2010 football (soccer) season in Brazil, which was the 109th season of competitive football in the country.

== Campeonato Brasileiro Série A ==
The 2010 Campeonato Brasileiro Série A started on May 8, 2010, and concluded on December 5, 2010.

Pos	Team	Pld	W	D	L	GF	GA	GD	Pts	Qualification or relegation
1	Fluminense	38	20	11	7	62	36	+26	71	2011 Copa Libertadores Second Stage
2	Cruzeiro	38	20	9	9	53	38	+15	69	2011 Copa Libertadores Second Stage
3	Corinthians	38	19	11	8	65	41	+24	68	2011 Copa Libertadores First Stage
4	Grêmio	38	17	12	9	68	43	+25	63	2011 Copa Libertadores First Stage
5	Atlético Paranaense	38	17	9	12	43	45	−2	60	2011 Copa Sudamericana Second Stage
6	Botafogo	38	14	17	7	54	42	+12	59	2011 Copa Sudamericana Second Stage
7	Internacional	38	16	10	12	48	41	+7	58	2011 Copa Libertadores Second Stage (Note: Internacional qualified as the 2010 Copa Libertadores champion.)
8	Santos	38	15	11	12	63	50	+13	56	2011 Copa Libertadores Second Stage (Note: Santos qualified as the 2010 Copa do Brasil champion.)
9	São Paulo	38	15	10	13	54	54	0	55	2011 Copa Sudamericana Second Stage
10	Palmeiras	38	12	14	12	42	43	−1	50	2011 Copa Sudamericana Second Stage
11	Vasco da Gama	38	11	16	11	43	45	−2	49	2011 Copa Sudamericana Second Stage
12	Ceará	38	10	17	11	35	44	−9	47	2011 Copa Sudamericana Second Stage
13	Atlético Mineiro	38	13	6	19	52	64	−12	45	2011 Copa Sudamericana Second Stage
14	Flamengo	38	9	17	12	41	44	−3	44	2011 Copa Sudamericana Second Stage
15	Avaí	38	11	10	17	49	58	−9	43	
16	Atlético Goianiense	38	11	9	18	51	57	−6	42	
17	Vitória	38	9	15	14	42	48	−6	42	Relegation to Série B
18	Guarani	38	8	13	17	33	53	−20	37	Relegation to Série B
19	Goiás	38	8	9	21	41	68	−27	33	Relegation to Série B
20	Grêmio Prudente	38	7	10	21	39	64	−25	28 (Note: Grêmio Prudente was docked 3 points due to fielding a suspended player.)	Relegation to Série B

Rules for classification: 1st points; 2nd wins; 3rd goal difference; 4th goals scored; 5th head-to-head results; 6th least red cards received; 7th least yellow cards received; 8th draw
Notes:

Fluminense declared as the Campeonato Brasileiro Série A champions.

=== Relegation ===
The four worst placed teams, which are Vitória, Guarani, Goiás and Prudente, were relegated to the following year's second level.

== Campeonato Brasileiro Série B ==
The 2010 Campeonato Brasileiro Série B started on May 7, 2010, concluded on November 27, 2010.

Pos	Team	Pld	W	D	L	GF	GA	GD	Pts	Promotion or relegation
1	Coritiba (C, P)	38	21	8	9	69	49	+20	71	Promotion to Campeonato Brasileiro
2	Figueirense (P)	38	19	10	9	68	37	+31	67	Promotion to Campeonato Brasileiro
3	Bahia (P)	38	19	8	11	63	44	+19	65	Promotion to Campeonato Brasileiro
4	América Mineiro (P)	38	19	6	13	56	42	+14	63	Promotion to Campeonato Brasileiro
5	Portuguesa	38	19	5	14	69	52	+17	62	
6	Sport Recife	38	15	11	12	54	42	+12	56	
7	Paraná	38	15	8	15	47	44	+3	53	
8	Bragantino	38	13	14	11	52	37	+15	53	
9	ASA	38	16	4	18	52	56	−4	52	
10	São Caetano	38	14	10	14	50	52	−2	52	
11	Duque de Caxias	38	15	5	18	46	56	−10	50	
12	Icasa	38	13	10	15	53	51	+2	49	
13	Náutico	38	14	6	18	41	60	−19	48	
14	Ponte Preta	38	12	12	14	49	48	+1	48	
15	Guaratinguetá	38	11	14	13	47	59	−12	47	
16	Vila Nova	38	13	7	18	50	69	−19	46	
17	Brasiliense (R)	38	12	10	16	41	59	−18	46	Relegation to Série C
18	Santo André (R)	38	11	10	17	53	61	−8	43	Relegation to Série C
19	Ipatinga (R)	38	11	8	19	47	62	−15	41	Relegation to Série C
20	América de Natal (R)	38	11	8	19	40	68	−28	41	Relegation to Série C

Updated to match(es) played on November 27, 2010. Source: CBF (in Portuguese)
Rules for classification: 1st points; 2nd wins; 3rd goal difference; 4th goals scored; 5th head-to-head results; 6th least red cards received; 7th least yellow cards received; 8th draw
(C) Champions; (P) Promoted; (R) Relegated

Coritiba declared as the Campeonato Brasileiro Série B champions.

=== Promotion ===
The four best placed teams, which are Coritiba, Figueirense, Bahia and América-MG, were promoted to the following year's first level.

=== Relegation ===
The four worst placed teams, which are Brasiliense, Santo André, Ipatinga and América-RN, were relegated to the following year's third level.

== Campeonato Brasileiro Série C ==
The 2010 Campeonato Brasileiro Série C started on July 18, 2010, and concluded on November 21, 2010. The Campeonato Brasileiro Série C final was played between ABC and Ituiutaba.

November 13, 2010

Ituiutaba	0–1	ABC

Parque do Sabiá

November 21, 2010

ABC	0–0	Ituiutaba

Frasqueirão

ABC declared as the league champions by aggregate score of 1–0.

=== Participating teams ===
- ABC
- Águia de Marabá
- Alecrim
- Brasil
- Campinense
- Caxias
- Chapecoense
- CRB
- Criciúma
- Fortaleza
- Gama
- Ituiutaba
- Juventude
- Luverdense
- Macaé
- Marília
- Paysandu
- Rio Branco-AC
- Salgueiro
- São Raimundo

=== Promotion ===
The four best placed teams, which are ABC, Ituiutaba, Criciúma and Salgueiro, were promoted to the following year's second level.

=== Relegation ===
The four worst placed teams, which are Alecrim, Juventude, Gama and São Raimundo (PA), were relegated to the following year's fourth level.

== Campeonato Brasileiro Série D ==
The 2010 Campeonato Brasileiro Série D started on July 18, 2010, and concluded on November 14, 2010. The Campeonato Brasileiro Série D final was played between Guarany de Sobral and América (AM).

November 7, 2010

América (AM)	1–1	Guarany de Sobral

Estádio Colosso do Tapajós

November 14, 2010

Guarany de Sobral	4–1	América (AM)

Estádio do Junco

Guarany de Sobral declared as the league champions by aggregate score of 5–2.

=== Promotion ===
The four best placed teams, which are Guarany de Sobral, Madureira, Joinville and Araguaína, were promoted to the following year's third level. On December 9, 2010 the STJD punished América (AM) with the loss of six points due to fielding an out-of-contract player. América (AM) then lost its promotion, which was awarded to Joinville.

== Copa do Brasil ==
The 2010 Copa do Brasil started on February 10, 2010, and ended on August 4, 2010. The Copa do Brasil final was played between Santos and Vitória.

July 28, 2010

Santos	2–0	Vitória

Vila Belmiro

August 4, 2010

Vitória	2–1	Santos

Barradão

Santos declared as the cup champions on better goal difference by aggregate score of 3–2.

== State championship champions ==
State	Champion
(Acre (state)) Acre	Rio Branco-AC
Alagoas	Murici
Amapá	Trem
(Amazonas (Brazilian state)) Amazonas	Penarol
Bahia	Vitória
Ceará	Fortaleza
(Federal District (Brazil)) Distrito Federal	Ceilândia
Espírito Santo	Rio Branco-ES
Goiás	Atlético-GO
Maranhão	Sampaio Corrêa
Mato Grosso	União
Mato Grosso do Sul	Comercial-ES
Minas Gerais	Atlético Mineiro
Pará	Paysandu
Paraíba	Treze
(Paraná (state)) Paraná	Coritiba
Pernambuco	Sport
Piauí	Comercial-PI
(Rio de Janeiro (state)) Rio de Janeiro	Botafogo
Rio Grande do Norte	ABC
Rio Grande do Sul	Grêmio
Rondônia	Vilhena
Roraima	Baré
(Santa Catarina (state)) Santa Catarina	Avaí
(São Paulo (state)) São Paulo	Santos
Sergipe	River Plate
Tocantins	Gurupi

== Youth competition champions ==
Competition	Champion
Campeonato Brasileiro Sub-20	Cruzeiro
Copa 2 de Julho	Brazil U16
Copa Brasil Sub-17 (Copa Nacional do Espírito Santo Sub-17)^{(1)}	Internacional
Copa Santiago de Futebol Juvenil	Internacional
Copa São Paulo de Juniores	São Paulo
Copa Sub-17 de Promissão	Cruzeiro
Supercopa Eurofarma de Futebol Júnior	Santos
Taça Belo Horizonte de Juniores	Coritiba

^{(1)} The Copa Nacional do Espírito Santo Sub-17, between 2008 and 2012, was named Copa Brasil Sub-17. The similar named Copa do Brasil Sub-17 is organized by the Brazilian Football Confederation and it was first played in 2013.

== Other competition champions ==
Competition	Champion
Campeonato do Nordeste	Vitória
Campeonato Paulista do Interior	Botafogo-SP
Copa Espírito Santo	Vitória-ES
Copa FGF	Internacional B
Copa Governador do Mato Grosso	Cuiabá
Copa Paulista de Futebol	Paulista
Copa Pernambuco	Santa Cruz
Copa Rio	Sendas
Copa Santa Catarina	Brusque
Copa Sub23	Internacional
Recopa Sul-Brasileira	Cerâmica
Taça Minas Gerais	Uberaba

== Brazilian clubs in international competitions ==
Team	2010 Copa Libertadores	2010 Copa Sudamericana	2010 FIFA Club World Cup
Atlético Mineiro	did not qualify	Quarterfinals eliminated by (Brazil) Palmeiras	N/A
Avaí	did not qualify	Quarterfinals eliminated by (Brazil) Goiás	N/A
Corinthians	Round of 16 eliminated by (Brazil) Flamengo	N/A	did not qualify
Cruzeiro	Quarterfinals eliminated by (Brazil) São Paulo	N/A	did not qualify
Flamengo	Quarterfinals eliminated by Universidad de Chile	N/A	did not qualify
Goiás	N/A	Runners-up lost to (Argentina) Independiente	N/A
Grêmio	N/A	Second Stage eliminated by (Brazil) Goiás	N/A
Grêmio Prudente	N/A	Second Stage eliminated by (Brazil) Atlético Mineiro	N/A
Internacional	Champions defeated (Mexico) Guadalajara	N/A	Third place defeated (South Korea) Seognam Ilhwa Chunma
Palmeiras	N/A	Semifinals eliminated by (Brazil) Goiás	N/A
Santos	N/A	Second Stage eliminated by (Brazil) Avaí	N/A
São Paulo	Semifinals eliminated by (Brazil) Internacional	N/A	did not qualify
Vitória	N/A	Second Stage eliminated by (Brazil) Palmeiras	N/A

== Brazil national team ==
The following table lists all the games played by the Brazil national team in official competitions and friendly matches during 2010.

March 2, 2010 International; Friendly	Republic of Ireland	0–2	Brazil	London, England
20:05 (UTC+1)		Report	K. Andrews 44' (o.g.); Robinho 76'	Stadium: Emirates Stadium; Attendance: 40,082; Referee: Mike Dean (England)

June 2, 2010 International; Friendly	Zimbabwe	0–3	Brazil	Harare, Zimbabwe
		Report	Bastos 41'; Robinho 44'; Elano 57'	Stadium: National Sports Stadium; Attendance: 30,000; Referee: Abdul Basit Ebrahim (South Africa)

June 7, 2010 International; Friendly	Tanzania	1–5	Brazil	Dar es Salaam, Tanzania
	Jabir Stima 86'	Report	Robinho 10', 33'; Ramires 53', 90+1'; Kaká 75'	Stadium: Benjamin Mkapa National Stadium; Attendance: 35,000; Referee: Muhmed Ssegonga (Uganda)

June 15, 2010 FIFA World Cup; Group Stage	Brazil	2–1	North Korea	Johannesburg, South Africa
20:30 (UTC+2)	Maicon 55'; Elano 72'	Report	Ji Yun-nam 89'	Stadium: Ellis Park Stadium; Attendance: 54,331; Referee: Viktor Kassai (Hungary)

June 20, 2010 FIFA World Cup; Group Stage	Brazil	3–1	Ivory Coast	Johannesburg, South Africa
20:30 (UTC+2)	Luís Fabiano 25', 50'; Elano 62'	Report	Drogba 79'	Stadium: Soccer City; Attendance: 84,455; Referee: Stéphane Lannoy (France)

June 25, 2010 FIFA World Cup; Group Stage	Portugal	0–0	Brazil	Durban, South Africa
16:00 (UTC+2)		Report		Stadium: Moses Mabhida Stadium; Attendance: 62,712; Referee: Benito Archundia (Mexico)

June 28, 2010 FIFA World Cup; Round of 16	Brazil	3–0	Chile	Johannesburg, South Africa
20:30 (UTC+2)	Juan 35'; Luís Fabiano 38'; Robinho 59'	Report		Stadium: Ellis Park Stadium; Attendance: 54,096; Referee: Howard Webb (England)

July 2, 2010 FIFA World Cup; Quarter-finals	Netherlands	2–1	Brazil	Port Elizabeth, South Africa
16:00 (UTC+2)	Sneijder 53', 68'	Report	Robinho 10'	Stadium: Nelson Mandela Bay Stadium; Attendance: 40,186; Referee: Yuichi Nishimura (Japan)

August 10, 2010 International; Friendly	United States	0–2	Brazil	New Jersey, United States
20:00 (UTC-4)		Report	Neymar 28'; Pato 45+1'	Stadium: New Meadowlands Stadium; Attendance: 77,223; Referee: Silviu Petrescu (Canada)

October 7, 2010 International; Friendly	Iran	0–3	Brazil	Abu Dhabi, United Arab Emirates
		Report	Alves 14'; Pato 69'; Nilmar 90+1'	Stadium: Sheikh Zayed Stadium; Attendance: 14,000; Referee: Fareed Al Marzouqi (UAE)

October 11, 2010 International; Friendly	Brazil	2–0	Ukraine	Derby, England
	Alves 25'; Pato 64'	Report		Stadium: Pride Park Stadium; Attendance: 13,088; Referee: Martin Atkinson (England)

November 17, 2010 International; Friendly	Argentina	1–0	Brazil	Doha, Qatar
	Messi 90+2'	Report		Stadium: Khalifa International Stadium; Attendance: 49,000; Referee: Abdullah Balideh (Qatar)

== Women's football ==
=== National team ===
The following table lists all the games played by the Brazil women's national football team in official competitions and friendly matches during 2010.

October 24, 2010 International; Friendly	Brazil	7–0	Haiti	Teresópolis, Brazil
	Renata Costa (?); Grazielle (?); Marta (?); Cristiane (?); Renata (?)	Report		Stadium: Granja Comary

November 5, 2010 Campeonato Sudamericano; Group Stage	Brazil	4–0	Venezuela	Loja, Ecuador
19:00 UTC-5	Aline 26', 30'; Cristiane 42'; Renata Costa 60'	Report		Stadium: Estadio Federativo Reina del Cisne; Referee: Sirley Cornejo Arana (Bolivia)

November 7, 2010 Campeonato Sudamericano; Group Stage	Uruguay	0–4	Brazil	Loja, Ecuador
13:00 UTC-5		Report	Cristiane 15' (pen.), 40'; Marta 36', 57'	Stadium: Estadio Federativo Reina del Cisne

November 11, 2010 Campeonato Sudamericano; Group Stage	Colombia	1–2	Brazil	Cuenca, Ecuador
19:00 UTC-5	Muñoz 57'	Report	Cristiane 13'; Marta 28'	Stadium: Estadio Alejandro Serrano Aguilar

November 13, 2010 Campeonato Sudamericano; Group Stage	Brazil	3–0	Paraguay	Cuenca, Ecuador
19:00 UTC-5	Cristiane 18', 36'; Marta 57'	Report		Stadium: Estadio Alejandro Serrano Aguilar

November 17, 2010 Campeonato Sudamericano; Second Stage	Brazil	4–0	Argentina	Latacunga, Ecuador
17:00 UTC-5	Graziele 25'; Dos Santos 37'; Marta 63'; Cristiane 77'	Report		Stadium: Estadio La Cocha

November 19, 2010 Campeonato Sudamericano; Second Stage	Brazil	5–0	Colombia	Latacunga, Ecuador
17:00 UTC-5	Érika 23'; Grazielle 48'; Marta 69', 87'; Cristiane 82'	Report		Stadium: Estadio La Cocha; Referee: Gabriela Lourdes Bandeira Popich (Uruguay)

November 21, 2010 Campeonato Sudamericano; Second Stage	Chile	1–3	Brazil	Quito, Ecuador
14:00 UTC-5	Salgado 45'	Report	Batista 2'; Marta 36', 83'	Stadium: Estadio Olímpico Atahualpa

December 9, 2010 Torneio Internacional Feminino	Brazil	3–0	Mexico	São Paulo, Brazil
	Cristiane 21'; Marta 56', 60'			Stadium: Estádio do Pacaembu

December 12, 2010 Torneio Internacional Feminino	Brazil	3–2	Netherlands	São Paulo, Brazil
	Marta (?); Gabriela (?)		Kirsten van de Ven (?); De Ridder (?)	Stadium: Estádio do Pacaembu

December 15, 2010 Torneio Internacional Feminino	Brazil	0–0	Canada	São Paulo, Brazil
				Stadium: Estádio do Pacaembu

December 19, 2010 Torneio Internacional Feminino; Final	Brazil	2–2	Canada	São Paulo, Brazil
	Marta 54', 72'		Belanger 11'; Christine Sinclair 82'	Stadium: Estádio do Pacaembu; Attendance: 18,784; Referee: Katiucia da Mota Lima (São Paulo)

The Brazil women's national football team competed in the following competitions in 2010:

Competition	Performance
Campeonato Sudamericano	Champions
Torneio Internacional Feminino	Runners-up

=== Copa do Brasil de Futebol Feminino ===
The 2010 Copa do Brasil de Futebol Feminino started on August 16, 2010, and concluded on December 4, 2010.

December 1, 2010

Foz do Iguaçu	1–2	Duque de Caxias/CEPE

Estádio do ABC

December 4, 2010

Duque de Caxias/CEPE	1–0	Foz do Iguaçu

Estádio Romário de Souza Faria

Duque de Caxias/CEPE declared as the cup champions by aggregate score of 2–2.

=== Domestic competition champions ===
Competition	Champion
Campeonato Carioca	Vasco
Campeonato Paulista	Santos

=== Brazilian clubs in international competitions ===
Team	2010 Copa Libertadores Femenina
Santos	Champions defeated (Chile) Everton
