= 2014 Copa América Femenina =

Copa América Femenina Ecuador 2014

Tournament details
- Host country: Ecuador
- Dates: 11–28 September
- Teams: 10 (from 1 confederation)
- Venue: 9 (in 8 host cities)

Final positions
- Champions: Brazil (6th title)
- Runners-up: Colombia
- Third place: Ecuador
- Fourth place: Argentina

Tournament statistics
- Matches played: 26
- Goals scored: 84 (3.23 per match)
- Top scorer(s): (Brazil) Cristiane (6 goals)
- Fair play award: Argentina

The 2014 Copa América Femenina was the seventh edition of the Copa América Femenina, an association football competition for women's national teams in South America affiliated with CONMEBOL. The tournament was played between 11 and 28 September 2014 in Ecuador.

== Qualification for other tournaments ==
As in previous editions, the tournament served as CONMEBOL's qualifier for the FIFA Women's World Cup, the Pan American Games football tournament, and the Olympic football tournament, with the following qualifying rules:

- For the 2015 FIFA Women's World Cup in Canada, the top two teams qualified directly, and the third-placed team advanced to a play-off against the fourth-placed team of the 2014 CONCACAF Women's Championship.
- For the 2015 Pan American Games women's football tournament in Canada, the top four teams qualified.
- For the 2016 Summer Olympics women's football tournament in Brazil, since Brazil automatically qualified as hosts, the top-ranked team other than Brazil qualified. Since Brazil won the tournament, the runners-up Colombia joined Brazil as the two women's national teams from South America in the 2016 Olympics.

== Host selection ==
Ecuador was confirmed as hosts in February 2014. Bolivia had also shown interest.

== Teams ==
All ten CONMEBOL teams participated.

- Argentina
- Bolivia
- Brazil (holders)
- Chile
- Colombia
- Ecuador (hosts)
- Paraguay
- Peru
- Uruguay
- Venezuela

== Venues ==
City	Stadium	Capacity
Ambato	Estadio Bellavista	18,000
Azogues	Estadio Jorge Andrade	15,000
Cuenca	Estadio Alejandro Serrano Aguilar	22,000
Latacunga	Estadio La Cocha	15,000
Loja	Estadio Federativo Reina del Cisne	14,935
Quito	Estadio Olímpico Atahualpa	35,742
Quito	Estadio Chillogallo	22,000
Riobamba	Estadio Olímpico de Riobamba	20,000
Sangolquí	Estadio Rumiñahui	8,000

== Match officials ==
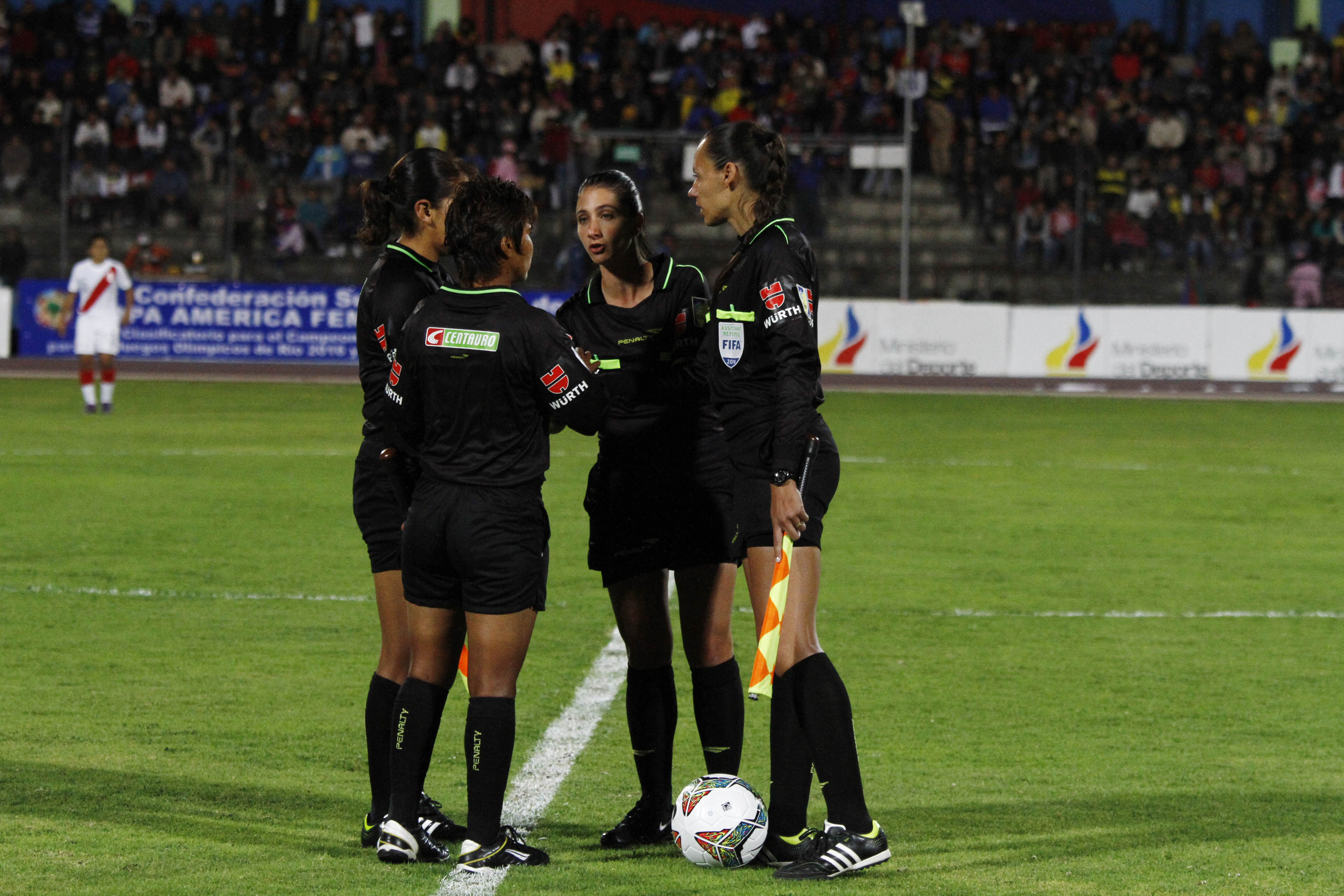
Officials of the Ecuador – Peru match: Laura Fortunato, Mariana De Almeida, Marina Quiroga, Sirley Cornejo.

Ten referees and ten assistants were announced on 6 September 2014.

Country	Referee	Assistant
(Argentina)	Laura Fortunato	Mariana De Almeida
(Bolivia)	Sirley Cornejo	Marina Quiroga
(Brazil)	Regildenia Moura	Janette Arcanjo
(Chile)	María Belén Carvajal	Loreto Andrea Toloza
(Colombia)	Viviana Muñoz	Luz Amalia Ruiz
(Ecuador)	Juana Delgado	Mónica Amboya
(Paraguay)	Zulma Quiñonez	Laura Miranda
(Peru)	Silvia Reyes	Gabriela Moreno
(Uruguay)	Gabriela Bandeira	Luciana Mascaraña
(Venezuela)	Yercinia Correa	Yoly García

== First stage ==
The draw was held on 22 May 2014. All times are ECT (UTC−5).

The teams were drawn into two groups of five teams and played a round-robin within their group from September 11 to 20. The top two teams from each group advanced to the final stage.

If teams finish level on points, order will be determined according to the following criteria:

1. superior goal difference in all matches
2. greater number of goals scored in all group matches
3. better result in matches between tied teams
4. drawing of lots

=== Group A ===
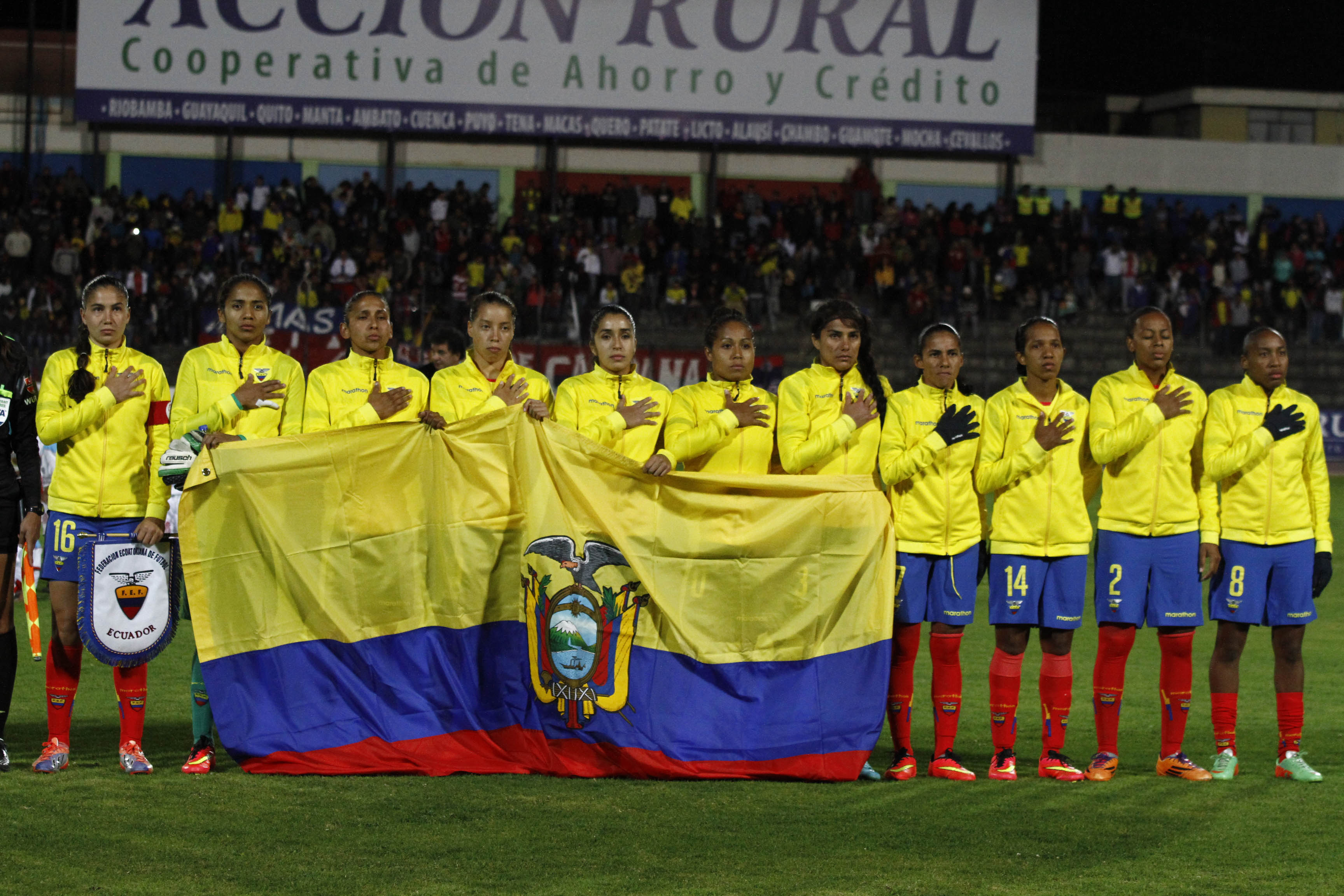
Ecuador starting eleven before the match against Peru.

Pos	Team	Pld	W	D	L	GF	GA	GD	Pts	Qualification
1	Colombia	4	4	0	0	10	1	+9	12	Final stage and 2015 Pan American Games
2	Ecuador (H)	4	2	0	2	3	3	0	6	Final stage and 2015 Pan American Games
3	Uruguay	4	2	0	2	5	9	−4	6	
4	Venezuela	4	1	1	2	4	6	−2	4	
5	Peru	4	0	1	3	1	4	−3	1	

Source: CONMEBOL
Rules for classification: 1) points in all matches; 2) total goal difference; 3) total goals scored; 4) repeat 1–3 for matches between teams still tied; 6) lots drawn by CONMEBOL.
(H) Hosts
11 September 2014
17:00

Uruguay	1–3	Venezuela
L. Viana 42'	Report	Ascanio 9'; García 23'; Rodríguez 71'

Estadio Olímpico de Riobamba, Riobamba
Referee: Zulma Quiñónez (Paraguay)
11 September 2014
19:10

Ecuador	1–0	Peru
Barre 84'	Report

Estadio Olímpico de Riobamba, Riobamba
Referee: Laura Fortunato (Argentina)

13 September 2014
13:00

Colombia	4–0	Uruguay
Andrade 6'; N. Arias 58'; Santos 69'; Ospina 90'	Report

Estadio Bellavista, Ambato
Referee: Regildenia Moura (Brazil)
13 September 2014
15:10

Ecuador	1–0	Venezuela
Vázquez 30'	Report

Estadio Bellavista, Ambato
Referee: María Belén Carvajal (Chile)

15 September 2014
17:00

Colombia	4–1	Venezuela
Rincón 15'; Ortiz 40'; Velasquez 65'; Cosme 90+1'	Report	García 78'

Estadio Olímpico de Riobamba, Riobamba
Referee: Sirley Cornejo (Bolivia)
15 September 2014
19:10

Uruguay	2–1	Peru
Pion 30'; P. González 90+2'	Report	Flores 14'

Estadio Olímpico de Riobamba, Riobamba
Referee: María Belén Carvajal (Chile)

17 September 2014
13:00

Venezuela	0–0	Peru
	Report

Estadio Bellavista, Ambato
Referee: Laura Fortunato (Argentina)
17 September 2014
15:10

Ecuador	0–1	Colombia
	Report	Ariza 60'

Estadio Bellavista, Ambato
Referee: Regildenia Moura (Brazil)

19 September 2014
17:00

Colombia	1–0	Peru
Rincón 39'	Report

Estadio La Cocha, Latacunga
Referee: Zulma Quiñónez (Paraguay)
19 September 2014
19:10

Ecuador	1–2	Uruguay
Lattanzio 87'	Report	P. González 7'; Badell 56'

Estadio La Cocha, Latacunga
Referee: Sirley Cornejo (Bolivia)

=== Group B ===
Pos	Team	Pld	W	D	L	GF	GA	GD	Pts	Qualification
1	Brazil	4	3	0	1	12	3	+9	9	Final stage and 2015 Pan American Games
2	Argentina	4	3	0	1	9	1	+8	9	Final stage and 2015 Pan American Games
3	Paraguay	4	2	0	2	14	9	+5	6	
4	Chile	4	2	0	2	6	5	+1	6	
5	Bolivia	4	0	0	4	2	25	−23	0	

Source: CONMEBOL
Rules for classification: 1) points in all matches; 2) total goal difference; 3) total goals scored; 4) repeat 1–3 for matches between teams still tied; 6) lots drawn by CONMEBOL.
12 September 2014
17:00

Argentina	0–1	Chile
	Report	Lara 47'

Estadio Federativo Reina del Cisne, Loja
Referee: Gabriela Bandeira (Uruguay)
12 September 2014
19:10

Brazil	6–0	Bolivia
Formiga 19', 73'; Andressa Alves 30'; Darlene 51'; Thaisa 84'; Fabiana 90+2'	Report

Estadio Federativo Reina del Cisne, Loja
Referee: Juana Delgado (Ecuador)

14 September 2014
13:00

Bolivia	0–6	Argentina
	Report	Vallejos 50', 72'; Bonsegundo 54'; Larroquette 62', 77', 87'

Estadio Bellavista, Ambato
Referee: Yercinia Correa (Venezuela)
14 September 2014
15:10

Paraguay	1–4	Brazil
Fleitas 9'	Report	Andressa Alves 35'; Cristiane 45+5', 56'; Fabiana 57'

Estadio Bellavista, Ambato
Referee: Silvia Reyes (Peru)

16 September 2014
17:00

Chile	3–0	Bolivia
Lara 26' (pen.); Guerrero 61'; Zamora 90+2'	Report

Estadio Alejandro Serrano Aguilar, Cuenca
Referee: Susana Corella (Ecuador)
16 September 2014
19:10

Argentina	1–0	Paraguay
Cabrera 9'	Report

Estadio Alejandro Serrano Aguilar, Cuenca
Referee: Viviana Muñoz (Colombia)

18 September 2014
17:00

Bolivia	2–10	Paraguay
Morón 43', 85'	Report	Fernández 10', 77', 81', 90+1'; Riveros 35'; Ortiz 44', 89'; Quintana 65'; Martínez 75', 84'

Estadio Alejandro Serrano Aguilar, Cuenca
Referee: Yercinia Correa (Venezuela)
18 September 2014
19:10

Chile	0–2	Brazil
	Report	Maurine 22'; Cristiane 49'

Estadio Alejandro Serrano Aguilar, Cuenca
Referee: Viviana Muñoz (Colombia)

20 September 2014
14:00

Paraguay	3–2	Chile
Ortiz 15'; Quintana 78'; Martínez 85'	Report	Lara 47'; Araya 72'

Estadio Jorge Andrade, Azogues
Referee: Silvia Reyes (Peru)
20 September 2014
16:10

Brazil	0–2	Argentina
	Report	Cometti 23'; Banini 73' (pen.)

Estadio Jorge Andrade, Azogues
Referee: Gabriela Bandeira (Uruguay)

== Final stage ==
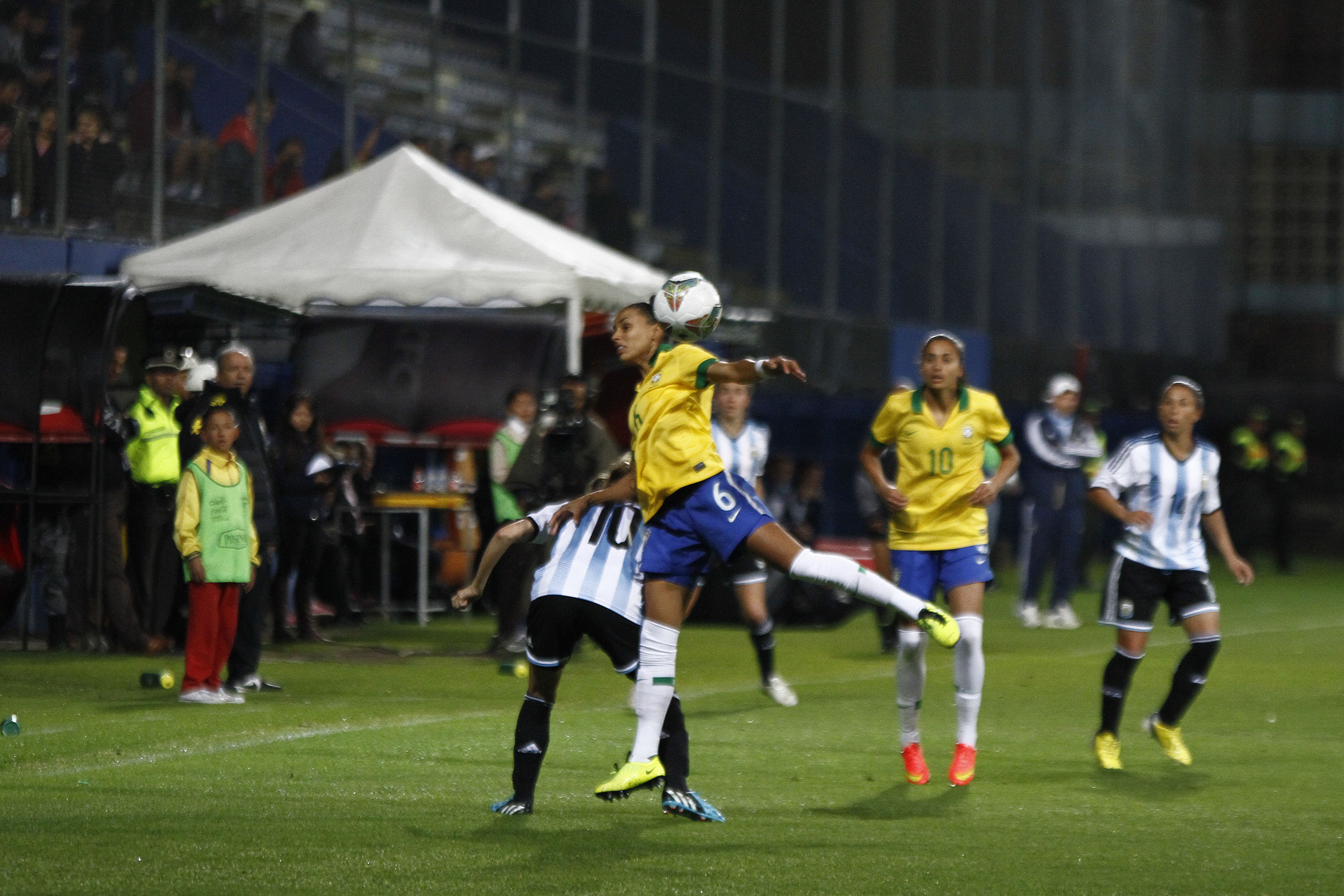
Argentina and Brazil do battle in the final four; this was their second meeting of the tournament.

The four teams played a round-robin from September 24 to 28. Brazil and Colombia advanced directly to the 2015 FIFA Women's World Cup, while Ecuador advanced to the intercontinental playoff against CONCACAF, which eventually Ecuador succeeded in qualifying. Colombia also qualified for the women's tournament at the 2016 Summer Olympics. All four teams also qualified for the women's tournament at the 2015 Pan American Games.

Pos	Team	Pld	W	D	L	GF	GA	GD	Pts	Qualification
1	Brazil	3	2	1	0	10	0	+10	7	2015 FIFA Women's World Cup and 2016 Summer Olympics (Note: Both Brazil (as hosts) and Colombia (as best team other than Brazil) qualified for the 2016 Summer Olympics.)
2	Colombia	3	1	2	0	2	1	+1	5	2015 FIFA Women's World Cup and 2016 Summer Olympics
3	Ecuador (H)	3	1	0	2	4	8	−4	3	CONCACAF–CONMEBOL play-off
4	Argentina	3	0	1	2	2	9	−7	1	

Source: CONMEBOL
Rules for classification: 1) points in all matches; 2) total goal difference; 3) total goals scored; 4) repeat 1–3 for matches between teams still tied; 6) lots drawn by CONMEBOL.
(H) Hosts
Notes:
24 September 2014
13:00

Colombia	0–0	Argentina
	Report

Estadio Chillogallo, Quito
Referee: Sirley Cornejo (Bolivia)
24 September 2014
15:10

Brazil	4–0	Ecuador
Cristiane 14', 17'; Maurine 37'; Raquel 87'	Report

Estadio Chillogallo, Quito
Referee: Yercinia Correa (Venezuela)

26 September 2014
16:00

Colombia	2–1	Ecuador
Echeverry 12'; Rincón 55'	Report	Lattanzio 86'

Estadio Rumiñahui, Sangolquí
Referee: Silvia Reyes (Peru)
26 September 2014
18:10

Brazil	6–0	Argentina
Cristiane 32'; Andressa Alves 36'; Maurine 58'; Tayla 66'; Tamires 71'; Raquel 84'	Report

Estadio Rumiñahui, Sangolquí
Referee: María Belén Carvajal (Chile)

28 September 2014
10:00

Argentina	2–3	Ecuador
Banini 25'; Bonsegundo 30'	Report	Caicedo 36'; Rodríguez 60'; Lattanzio 77'

Estadio Olímpico Atahualpa, Quito
Referee: Zulma Quiñónez (Paraguay)
28 September 2014
12:10

Colombia	0–0	Brazil
	Report

Estadio Olímpico Atahualpa, Quito
Referee: Gabriela Bandeira (Uruguay)

== Awards ==
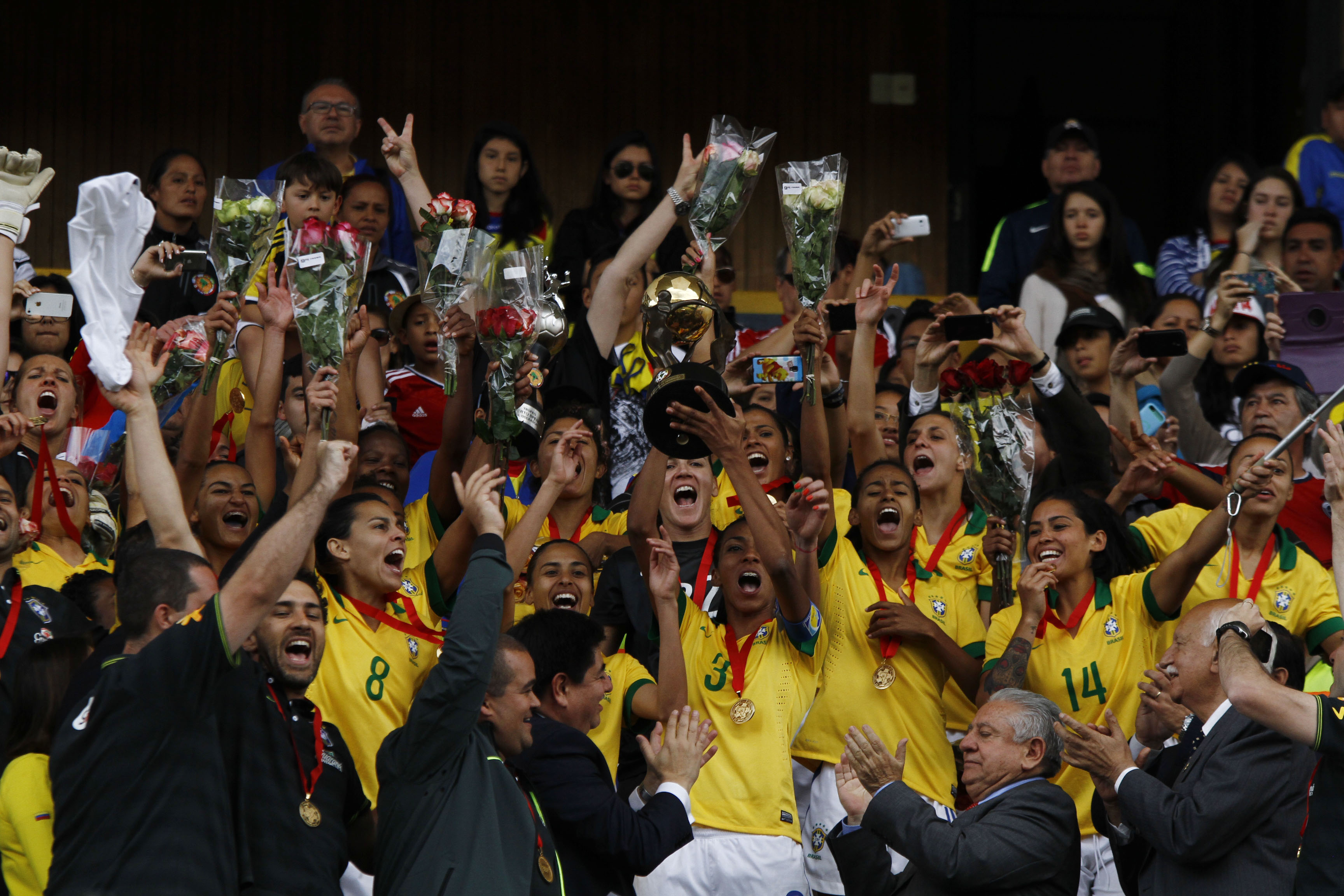
Brazil celebrating winning the tournament.

2014 Sudamericano Femenino winners

**Brazil**
**Sixth title**

- Top goalscorer: (Brazil) Cristiane (6 goals)
- Fair play award: Argentina

=== Qualified teams for Olympics ===
The following two teams from CONMEBOL qualified for the Olympic football tournament.

Team	Qualified on	Previous appearances in tournament^{1}
Brazil	2 October 2009	5 (1996, 2000, 2004, 2008, 2012)
Colombia	28 September 2014	1 (2012)

^{1} Bold indicates champion for that year. Italic indicates host for that year.

== Statistics ==
=== Goalscorers ===
6 goals

- (Brazil) Cristiane

4 goals

- (Paraguay) Rebeca Fernández

3 goals

- (Argentina) Mariana Larroquette
- (Brazil) Andressa Alves
- (Brazil) Maurine
- (Chile) Francisca Lara
- (Colombia) Yoreli Rincón
- (Ecuador) Giannina Lattanzio
- (Paraguay) Jessica Martínez
- (Paraguay) Lourdes Ortiz

2 goals

- (Argentina) Estefanía Banini
- (Argentina) Florencia Bonsegundo
- (Argentina) Fabiana Vallejos
- (Bolivia) Janeth Morón
- (Brazil) Fabiana
- (Brazil) Formiga
- (Brazil) Raquel
- (Paraguay) Dulce Quintana
- (Uruguay) Pamela González
- (Venezuela) Gabriela García

1 goal

- (Argentina) Micaela Cabrera
- (Argentina) Aldana Cometti
- (Brazil) Darlene
- (Brazil) Tamires
- (Brazil) Tayla
- (Brazil) Thaisa
- (Chile) Fernanda Araya
- (Chile) Carla Guerrero
- (Chile) Daniela Zamora
- (Colombia) Lady Andrade
- (Colombia) Nataly Arias
- (Colombia) Tatiana Ariza
- (Colombia) Laura Cosme
- (Colombia) Isabella Echverria
- (Colombia) Melissa Ortiz
- (Colombia) Diana Ospina
- (Colombia) Leicy Santos
- (Colombia) Orianica Velasquez
- (Ecuador) Adriana Barre
- (Ecuador) Carina Caicedo
- (Ecuador) Ingrid Rodríguez
- (Ecuador) Erika Vázquez
- (Paraguay) Ana Fleitas
- (Paraguay) Verónica Riveros
- (Peru) Emily Flores
- (Uruguay) Yamila Badell
- (Uruguay) Mariana Pion
- (Uruguay) Lourdes Viana
- (Venezuela) Yusmery Ascanio
- (Venezuela) Daniuska Rodríguez

=== Final ranking ===
Pos	Team	Pld	W	D	L	GF	GA	GD	Pts
1	Brazil	7	5	1	1	22	3	+19	16
2	Colombia	7	5	2	0	12	2	+10	17
3	Ecuador	7	3	0	4	7	11	−4	9
4	Argentina	7	3	1	3	11	10	+1	10
**Eliminated in the first round**
5	Paraguay	4	2	0	2	14	9	+5	6
6	Chile	4	2	0	2	6	5	+1	6
7	Uruguay	4	2	0	2	5	9	−4	6
8	Venezuela	4	1	1	2	4	6	−2	4
9	Peru	4	0	1	3	1	4	−3	1
10	Bolivia	4	0	0	4	2	25	−23	0
