= Palmira Loayza =

Bolivian footballer (born 1985)

Personal information
- Full name: Palmira Paola Loayza Rodríguez
- Date of birth: 24 March 1985 (age 41)
- Position: Forward

Senior career*
| Years | Team | Apps | (Gls) |
- Gerimex
- Aurora
- Urkupiña (Cochabamba, futsal)

International career^{‡}
| 2004 | Bolivia U19 | 2+ | (6) |
| 2010 | Bolivia | 2+ | (3) |
- * Club domestic league appearances and goals ‡ National team caps and goals as of 12 November 2010

Palmira Paola Loayza Rodríguez (born 24 March 1985) is a Bolivian futsal player and a footballer who played as a forward for the Bolivia women's national team.

== International career ==
Loayza represented Bolivia at the 2004 South American U-19 Women's Championship. At senior level, she played the 2010 South American Women's Football Championship and the 2014 South American Games.

=== International goals ===
Scores and results list Bolivia's goal tally first

| No. | Date | Venue | Opponent | Score | Result | Competition |
|---|---|---|---|---|---|---|
| 1 | 10 November 2010 | Estadio Bellavista, Ambato, Ecuador | Ecuador | 1–0 | 3–4 | 2010 South American Women's Football Championship |
| 2 | 12 November 2010 | Estadio La Cocha, Latacunga, Ecuador | Peru | 1–1 | 2–1 | 2010 South American Women's Football Championship |
| 3 | 12 November 2010 | Estadio La Cocha, Latacunga, Ecuador | Peru | 2–1 | 2–1 | 2010 South American Women's Football Championship |
