= Estefanía Banini =

Argentine footballer (born 1990)

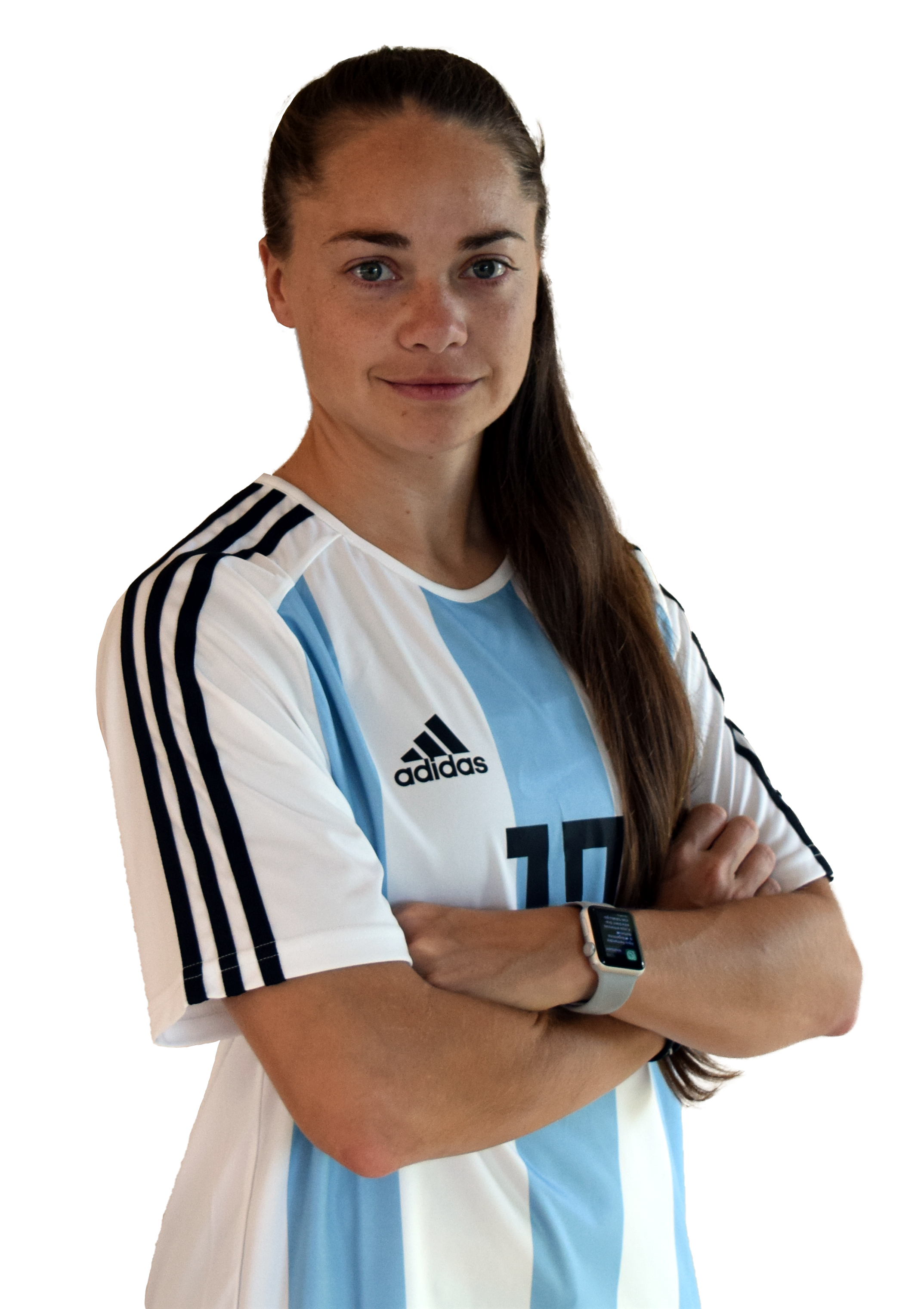
- Banini with Argentina in 2018

Personal information
- Full name: Estefanía Romina Banini Ruiz
- Date of birth: 21 June 1990 (age 36)
- Place of birth: Mendoza, Mendoza, Argentina
- Height: 1.62 m (5 ft 4 in)
- Position: Midfielder

Team information
- Current team: Colo-Colo
- Number: 10

Senior career*
Years	Team	Apps	(Gls)
2011–2014	Colo-Colo		
2015–2016	Washington Spirit	19	(5)
2016–2017	Valencia	21	(4)
2017–2019	Washington Spirit	21	(2)
2018–2019	→ Levante (loan)	19	(4)
2019–2021	Levante	43	(4)
2021–2024	Atlético Madrid	33	(5)
2024–2026	Levante Badalona	0	(0)
2026–	Colo-Colo		

International career
2010–2023	Argentina	53	(13)
Medal record
Women's football
Representing Argentina
South American Games
Gold medal – first place	2014 Santiago	Team
- * Club domestic league appearances and goals as of 15:54, 30 November 2021 (UTC)

Estefanía Romina Banini Ruiz (born 21 June 1990) is an Argentine professional footballer who plays as a midfielder for the Chilean club Colo-Colo.

Banini has previously spent four seasons with Colo-Colo of the Chilean women's football championship, two seasons with the Spirit, and a season with Valencia. Banini was previously a member of the Argentine women's national team, captaining the team in their second ever World Cup campaign in 2019. She is often referred to as the female equivalent of male football star Lionel Messi and the Marta of Argentina.

== Club career ==
=== Colo-Colo ===
Banini played for Colo-Colo in Chile from 2011 to 2014. In December 2014, she captained the team to win its ninth consecutive national title after scoring twice and defeating Santiago Morning 3–1.

=== Washington Spirit (2015–2016) ===
In January 2015, it was announced that Banini had signed with the Washington Spirit for the third season of the National Women's Soccer League (NWSL). Of her signing, Spirit head coach Mark Parsons said, "Estefania is an exceptional talent and I do not think there is a player like her in the league. She is going to give the team a very different dynamic and provide us with real quality in the final third." She played and started in the first four games of the 2015 season before sustaining an injury which sidelined her for the rest of the year. Banini came back strong midway through the 2016 season, scoring five goals in a seven-game period before sustaining another injury. The Argentine was awarded the Spirit 2016 Golden Boot award, NWSL Goal of the Week for Week 13, NWSL Player of the Week for Week 13, and NWSL Player of the Month for July.

=== Valencia (2016–2017) ===
In October 2016 Banini transferred to Spain's Primera División club Valencia CF Femenino.

=== Washington Spirit (2017–2019) ===
Banini re-signed with the Washington Spirit on 19 June 2017. she appeared in 9 games in 2017, and scored 1 goal. In 2018 Banini only appeared in 12 games for the Spirit as she missed time due to the 2018 Copa América and missed the last seven games of the season due to a knee injury.

On 4 December 2018 Banini re-signed with the Spirit for the 2019 NWSL season.

==== Loan to Levante ====
On 17 October 2018 Banini joined Levante in the Spanish Primera División.

=== Levante (2019–2021) ===
Although intended to play through the 2019 NWSL season, Banini signed a full contract with Levante in June 2019 that would last for two years. In her time at the club, she helped the team qualify for their first ever UEFA Women's Champions League tournament. In the 2021 Copa de la Reina final, she scored Levante's second goal against FC Barcelona Femení, but the match ended 4–2 in favor of Barcelona.

=== Atlético Madrid (2021–2024) ===
On 3 July 2021, Banini's transfer from Levante to Atlético Madrid was made official.

=== Colo-Colo ===
On 15 July 2026, Banini's return to Colo-Colo was made official.

== International career ==
Banini has played for the Argentina women's national football team since 2010. In September 2014, she scored a penalty kick in a match against Brazil helping Argentina win 2–0 during the Copa América Femenina tournament. Banini scored three goals at the 2018 Copa América Femenina.

Banini was called up to participate in the 2019 FIFA Women's World Cup with Argentina. In the tournament, she helped Argentina win their first ever World Cup point, earning a 0–0 draw against Japan. Following Argentina's exit in the group stage, Banini spoke out against national team coach Carlos Borrello for his outdated coaching methods and the Argentine Football Association (AFA) for poor working conditions. Banini was not called up to the national team for nearly three years following her statements.

At the end of 2020, Banini was named to the IFFHS' CONMEBOL Women's Team of the 2011-2020 Decade, the only Argentine on the list.

Banini made her international return for Argentina on 8 April 2022, starting in a 0–1 friendly home loss to Chile and played the entire match. At the 2023 FIFA Women's World Cup, Banini played her last international match, a 0–2 loss to Sweden.

=== International goals ===
Scores and results list Argentina's goal tally first

No.	Date	Venue	Opponent	Score	Result	Competition
1	4 November 2010	Estadio La Cocha, Latacunga, Ecuador	Bolivia	3–0	3–0	2010 South American Women's Football Championship
2	10 March 2014	Estadio Bicentenario de La Florida, Santiago, Chile	Bolivia	2–0	4–0	2014 South American Games
3	10 March 2014	Estadio Bicentenario de La Florida, Santiago, Chile	Bolivia	3–0	4–0	2014 South American Games
4	16 March 2014	Estadio Bicentenario de La Florida, Santiago, Chile	Chile	1–0	2–1	2014 South American Games
5	20 September 2014	Estadio Jorge Andrade, Azogues, Ecuador	Brazil	2–0	2–0	2014 Copa América Femenina
5	28 September 2014	Estadio Olímpico Atahualpa, Quito, Ecuador	Ecuador	1–0	2–3	2014 Copa América Femenina
7	5 April 2018	Estadio Municipal Francisco Sánchez Rumoroso, Coquimbo, Chile	Brazil	1–1	1–3	2018 Copa América Femenina
8	9 April 2018	Estadio Municipal Francisco Sánchez Rumoroso, Coquimbo, Chile	Ecuador	1–0	6–3	2018 Copa América Femenina
9	13 April 2018	Estadio Municipal Francisco Sánchez Rumoroso, Coquimbo, Chile	Venezuela	2–0	2–0	2018 Copa América Femenina
10	15 July 2022	Estadio Centenario, Armenia, Colombia	Uruguay	1–0	5–0	2022 Copa América Femenina
11	9 October 2022	Estadio Municipal de Chapín, Jerez, Spain	Poland	1–0	2–2	Friendly
12	9 April 2023	Estadio Mario Alberto Kempes, Córdoba, Argentina	Venezuela	3–0	3–0	Friendly
13	14 July 2023	Estadio Único de San Nicolás, San Nicolás de los Arroyos, Argentina	Peru	2–0	4–0	Friendly

== Honours ==
Colo-Colo

- Primera División (9): 2011 Apertura, 2011 Clausura, 2012 Apertura, 2012 Clausura, 2013 Apertura, 2013 Clausura, 2014 Apertura, 2014 Clausura, 2026
- Copa de Campeonas: 2015
- Copa Libertadores Femenina: 2012

Atlético Madrid

- Copa de la Reina: 2022–23

Argentina

- South American Games: 2014

Individual

- Player of the Year in Chile: 2013
- IFFHS CONMEBOL Woman Team of the Decade 2011–2020
- FIFA FIFPro Women's World11: 2021
