= Dulce Quintana =

Paraguayan footballer (born 1989)

Personal information
- Full name: Dulce María Quintana Giménez
- Date of birth: 6 February 1989 (age 37)
- Place of birth: Asunción, Paraguay
- Height: 1.66 m (5 ft 5 1/2 in)
- Position: Defender

Team information
- Current team: AEM

Senior career*
| Years | Team | Apps | (Gls) |
| 2003–2006 | Club Libertad | | |
| 2007 | CD Universidad Católica | | |
| 2008–2009 | Universidad Autónoma | | |
| 2010 | Club Everton de Viña del Mar | | |
| 2011–2012 | Universidad Autónoma | | |
| 2013–2014 | Foz Cataratas | 13 | (2) |
| 2015 | São Paulo FC | | |
| 2016 | XV de Piracicaba | | |
| 2016 | Iranduba | | |
| 2016 | Sportivo Limpeño | | |
| 2017–2021 | Espanyol | 91 | (0) |
| 2021– | AEM | 21 | (1) |

International career^{‡}
| 2006–2008 | Paraguay U20 | | (9) |
| 2006– | Paraguay | 19+ | (7) |
- * Club domestic league appearances and goals as of 10 April 2019 ‡ National team caps and goals as of 4 October 2019

Dulce María Quintana Giménez (born 6 February 1989) is a Paraguayan footballer who plays as a defender for Spanish club SE AEM and the Paraguay women's national team. Previously, she was also part of the Paraguay women's U20 team.

== Club career ==
Quintana spent most of her early career playing for clubs in Brazil and Chile. She won the 2016 Copa Libertadores Femenina with Club Sportivo Limpeño, before securing a move to RCD Espanyol of Spain in January 2017.

== International career ==
Quintana represented Paraguay at two South American U-20 Women's Championship editions (2006 and 2008). At senior level, she played in four Copa América Femenina editions (2006, 2010 and 2014), captaining her side in the 2022 edition.

=== International goals ===
Scores and results list Paraguay's goal tally first

| No. | Date | Venue | Opponent | Score | Result | Competition |
|---|---|---|---|---|---|---|
| 1 | 13 November 2006 | Estadio José María Minella, Mar del Plata, Argentina | Bolivia | 2–0 | 5–1 | 2006 South American Women's Football Championship |
| 2 | 13 November 2006 | Estadio José María Minella, Mar del Plata, Argentina | Bolivia | 3–1 | 5–1 | 2006 South American Women's Football Championship |
| 3 | 7 November 2010 | Estadio Federativo Reina del Cisne, Loja, Ecuador | Venezuela | 1–0 | 4–0 | 2010 South American Women's Football Championship |
| 4 | 9 November 2010 | Estadio Jorge Andrade, Azogues, Ecuador | Uruguay | 3–0 | 4–0 | 2010 South American Women's Football Championship |
| 5 | 18 September 2014 | Estadio Alejandro Serrano Aguilar, Cuenca, Ecuador | Bolivia | 4–1 | 10–2 | 2014 Copa América Femenina |
| 6 | 20 September 2014 | Estadio Jorge Andrade, Azogues, Ecuador | Chile | 2–2 | 3–2 | 2014 Copa América Femenina |
| 7 | 3 August 2019 | Estadio Universidad San Marcos, Lima, Peru | Jamaica | 3–1 | 3–1 | 2019 Pan American Games |
| 8 | 19 February 2023 | North Harbour Stadium, Auckland, New Zealand | Chinese Taipei | 1–2 | 2–2 (a.e.t.) (4–2 p) | 2023 FIFA Women's World Cup qualification |
| 9 | 9 June 2026 | Estadio Defensores del Chaco, Asunción, Paraguay | Colombia | 1–0 | 3–4 | 2025–26 CONMEBOL Women's Nations League |

== Honours ==
=== Club ===
Sportivo Limpeño

- Copa Libertadores Femenina: 2016
