= Carla Padilla =

Bolivian footballer (born 1988)

Personal information
- Full name: Carla Patricia Padilla Eve
- Date of birth: 9 May 1988 (age 38)
- Position: Midfielder

Senior career*
Years	Team	Apps	(Gls)
- Gerimex

International career^{‡}
2004	Bolivia U19	1+	(2)
2006–2014	Bolivia	6+	(1)
- * Club domestic league appearances and goals ‡ National team caps and goals as of 10 November 2010

Carla Patricia Padilla Eve (born 9 May 1988) is a Bolivian footballer who played as a midfielder for the Bolivia women's national team.

== Early life ==
Padilla hails from the Santa Cruz Department.

== International career ==
Padilla represented Bolivia at the 2004 South American U-19 Women's Championship. At senior level, she played two Copa América Femenina editions (2006 and 2010) and the 2014 South American Games.

=== International goals ===
Scores and results list Bolivia's goal tally first

No.	Date	Venue	Opponent	Score	Result	Competition
1	10 November 2010	Estadio Bellavista, Ambato, Ecuador	Ecuador	3–4	3–4	2010 South American Women's Football Championship
