= Angélica Vázquez =

Paraguayan footballer (born 1990)

Personal information
- Full name: Angélica María Vázquez Godoy
- Date of birth: 14 December 1990 (age 35)
- Height: 1.67 m (5 ft 6 in)
- Position: Midfielder

Team information
- Current team: Libertad/Limpeño
- Number: 14

Senior career*
Years	Team	Apps	(Gls)
- Universidad Autónoma
- Cerro Porteño
- Sportivo Limpeño

International career^{‡}
2010–2014	Paraguay	2+	(1)
- * Club domestic league appearances and goals ‡ National team caps and goals as of 14 September 2014

Angélica María Vázquez Godoy (born 14 December 1990) is a Paraguayan footballer who plays as a midfielder for Libertad/Limpeño. From 2010 till 2014, she has also been a member of the Paraguay women's national team.

== International career ==
Vázquez played for Paraguay at senior level in two Copa América Femenina editions (2010 and 2014).

=== International goals ===
Scores and results list Paraguay's goal tally first

No.	Date	Venue	Opponent	Score	Result	Competition
1	9 November 2010	Estadio Jorge Andrade, Azogues, Ecuador	Uruguay	4–0	4–0	2010 South American Women's Football Championship
