= Roxana Benavídez =

Bolivian footballer (born 1987)

Personal information
- Full name: Roxana Benavídez Mejía
- Date of birth: 1 September 1987 (age 39)
- Place of birth: La Paz, Bolivia
- Position: Midfielder

Senior career*
Years	Team	Apps	(Gls)
- Atlético Fernández
- Aurora

International career^{‡}
2006–2010	Bolivia	5+	(1)
- * Club domestic league appearances and goals ‡ National team caps and goals as of 10 November 2010

Roxana Benavídez Mejía (born 1 September 1987) is a Bolivian footballer who has played as a midfielder for the Bolivia women's national team.

== International career ==
Benavídez played for Bolivia at senior level in two Copa América Femenina editions (2006 and 2010).

=== International goals ===
Scores and results list Bolivia's goal tally first

No.	Date	Venue	Opponent	Score	Result	Competition
1	10 November 2010	Estadio Bellavista, Ambato, Ecuador	Ecuador	2–3	3–4	2010 South American Women's Football Championship
