= Joshelyn Sánchez =

Ecuadorian footballer (born 1992)

Personal information
- Full name: Joshelyn Estefanía Sánchez Maldonado
- Date of birth: 16 July 1992 (age 34)
- Place of birth: Quito, Ecuador
- Position: Forward

Team information
- Current team: El Nacional

Senior career*
Years	Team	Apps	(Gls)
2007–2010	Pichincha selection		
2010	Espuce		
2010	Pichincha selection		
2010–2013	Espuce		
2011	→ LDU Quito (loan)		
2013	Pichincha selection		
2013–2019	Espuce		
2019–	El Nacional	20	(2)

International career^{‡}
2008	Ecuador U17		
2010	Ecuador	1+	(2)
- * Club domestic league appearances and goals as of 4 September 2019 ‡ National team caps and goals as of 10 November 2010

Joshelyn Estefanía Sánchez Maldonado (born 16 July 1992) is an Ecuadorian footballer who plays as a forward for Super Liga Femenina club CD El Nacional. She has been a member of the Ecuador women's national team.

== International career ==
Sánchez represented Ecuador at the 2008 South American U-17 Women's Championship. At senior level, she played the 2010 South American Women's Football Championship.

=== International goals ===
Scores and results list Ecuador's goal tally first

No.	Date	Venue	Opponent	Score	Result	Competition
1	10 November 2010	Estadio Bellavista, Ambato, Ecuador	Bolivia	1–1	4–3	2010 South American Women's Football Championship
2	10 November 2010	Estadio Bellavista, Ambato, Ecuador	Bolivia	2–1	4–3	2010 South American Women's Football Championship
