= Patricia Freire =

Ecuadorian footballer (born 1984)

Personal information
- Full name: Carmen Patricia Freire Chiluisa
- Date of birth: 28 August 1984 (age 42)
- Place of birth: Quevedo, Ecuador
- Position: Midfielder

Senior career*
Years	Team	Apps	(Gls)
2002–2006	La Troncal		
2006	Los Ríos selection		
2006	La Troncal		
2006	Pichincha selection		
2007–2010	La Troncal		
2009	→ Deportivo Quito (loan)		
2010–2012	Guayas selection		
2010	→ Deportivo Quito (loan)		
2011	→ LDU Quito (loan)		
2013	Los Ríos selection		

International career^{‡}
2003–2010	Ecuador	4+	(2)
- * Club domestic league appearances and goals ‡ National team caps and goals as of 10 November 2010

Carmen Patricia Freire Chiluisa (born 28 August 1984), known as Patricia Freire, is an Ecuadorian former footballer who played as a midfielder. She has been a member of the Ecuador women's national team.

== International career ==
Freire played for Ecuador at senior level in two Copa América Femenina editions (2003 and 2010) and the 2007 Pan American Games.

=== International goals ===
Scores and results list Ecuador's goal tally first

No.	Date	Venue	Opponent	Score	Result	Competition
1	20 July 2007	Miécimo da Silva Sports Complex, Rio de Janeiro, Brazil	Uruguay	1–0	4–2	2007 Pan American Games
2	10 November 2010	Estadio Bellavista, Ambato, Ecuador	Bolivia	3–1	4–3	2010 South American Women's Football Championship
