= Paula Viera =

Uruguayan futsal player and footballer (born 1990)

Personal information
- Full name: Paula Sofía Viera
- Date of birth: 25 March 1990 (age 36)
- Position: Right back

Team information
- Current team: Peñarol (football, futsal)

Senior career*
Years	Team	Apps	(Gls)
2008	River Plate Montevideo		
2015–2016	Río Negro City (futsal)		
2018–	Peñarol (futsal)		
2019–	Peñarol	11	(0)

International career^{‡}
2010	Uruguay U20		
2010	Uruguay	1+	(1)
- * Club domestic league appearances and goals ‡ National team caps and goals as of 11 November 2010

Paula Sofía Viera (born 25 March 1990) is a Uruguayan futsal player and a footballer who plays as a right back for Peñarol. She has been a member of the Uruguay women's national team.

== International career ==
Viera represented Uruguay at the 2010 South American U-20 Women's Championship. At senior level, she played the 2010 South American Women's Football Championship.

=== International goals ===
Scores and results list Uruguay's goal tally first

No.	Date	Venue	Opponent	Score	Result	Competition
1	11 November 2010	Estadio Alejandro Serrano Aguilar, Cuenca, Ecuador	Venezuela	1–3	2–5	2010 South American Women's Football Championship
