= Lyana Chirinos =

Peruvian footballer (born 1992)

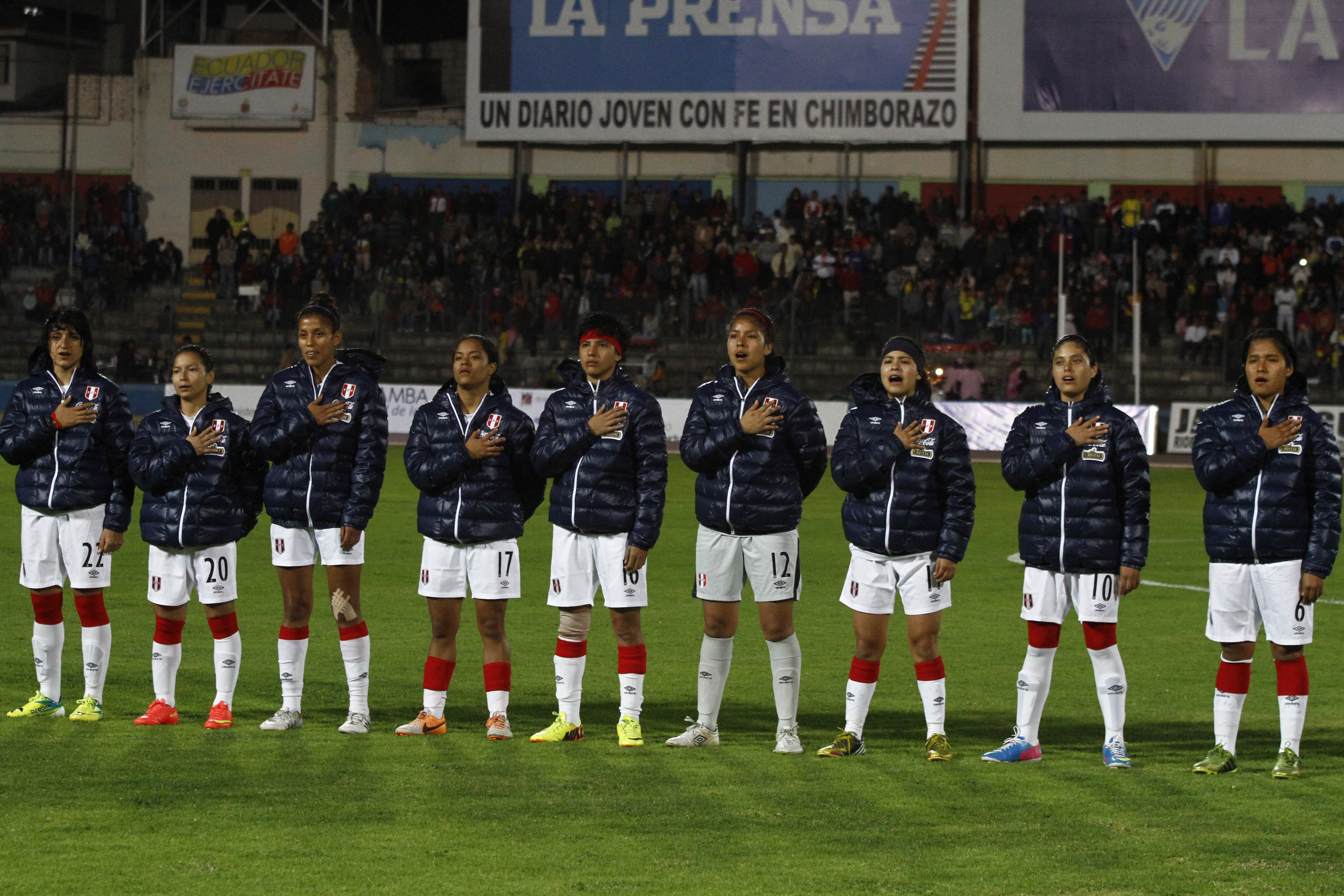
- Chirinos representing Peru at the 2014 Copa América Femenina

Personal information
- Full name: Lyana Merkel Chirinos Pérez
- Date of birth: 21 June 1992 (age 34)
- Place of birth: Lima, Peru
- Height: 1.68 m (5 ft 6 in)
- Position: Forward

College career
Years	Team	Apps	(Gls)
2013	Darton State Cavaliers	21	(35)
2014–2016	Lindsey Wilson Blue Raiders	61	(43)

International career^{‡}
2008	Peru U17	?	(?)
2012	Peru U20	?	(0)
2010–2014	Peru	6+	(2)
- ‡ National team caps and goals as of 20 September 2014

Lyana Merkel Chirinos Pérez (born 21 June 1992) is a Peruvian footballer who plays as a forward. She was a member of the Peru women's national team.

== College career ==
Chirinos attended the Darton State College and the Lindsey Wilson College, both in the United States.

== International career ==
Chirinos represented Peru at the 2008 South American U-17 Women's Championship and the 2012 South American U-20 Women's Championship. At senior level, she played two Copa América Femenina editions (2010 and 2014).

== Personal life ==
Chirinos' paternal grandmother is of Italian descent.
