= Joana Galeano =

Paraguayan footballer (born 1988)

Personal information
- Full name: Joana Beatriz Galeano
- Date of birth: 9 August 1988 (age 38)
- Height: 1.52 m (5 ft 0 in)
- Position: Midfielder

Team information
- Current team: Libertad/Limpeño
- Number: 7

Senior career*
Years	Team	Apps	(Gls)
2009	UAA		
2010	Everton		
2011–2012	UAA		
2013	Arkadia		
2013	Fomento (futsal)		
2014–	Sportivo Limpeño		
- UAA (futsal)
- Cerro Porteño (futsal)

International career^{‡}
2006–2018	Paraguay	8+	(1)
- * Club domestic league appearances and goals ‡ National team caps and goals as of 12 April 2018

Joana Beatriz Galeano (born 9 August 1988) is a Paraguayan footballer who plays as a midfielder for Libertad/Limpeño. She has been a member of the Paraguay women's national team. She is also a futsal player.

== International career ==
Galeano has played for Paraguay at senior level in three Copa América Femenina editions (2006, 2010 and 2018).

=== International goals ===
Scores and results list Paraguay's goal tally first

No.	Date	Venue	Opponent	Score	Result	Competition
1	9 November 2010	Estadio Jorge Andrade, Azogues, Ecuador	Uruguay	2–0	4–0	2010 South American Women's Football Championship

== Honours ==
=== Club ===
Sportivo Limpeño

- Copa Libertadores Femenina: 2016
