= Mama Negra =

Traditional festival

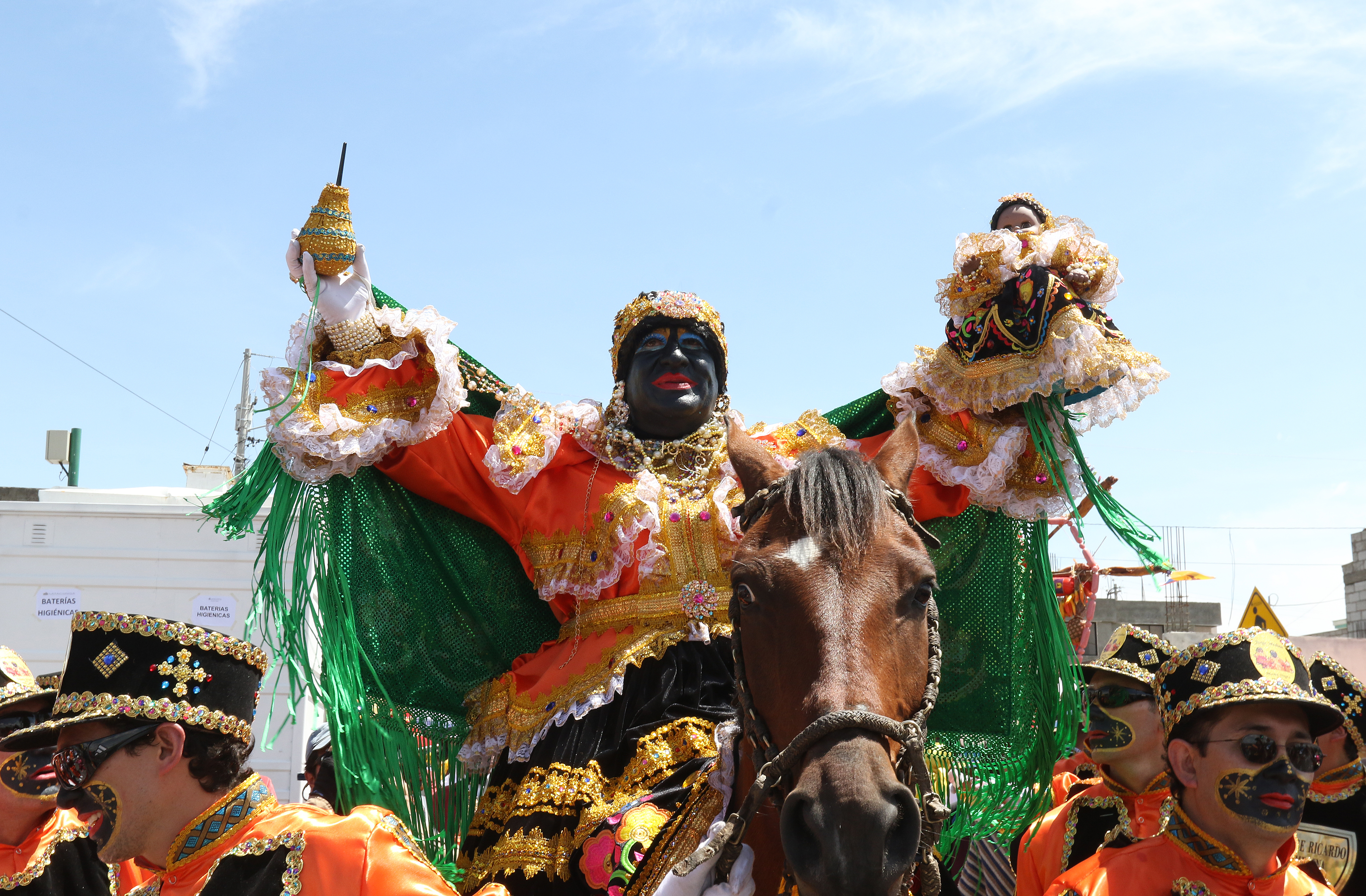
La Mama Negra

The Mama Negra is a traditional festival held twice a year in Latacunga, Cotopaxi Province, Ecuador. Also called La Santísima Tragedia (The Holy Tragedy), it is a celebration in honor of the Virgen de la Merced (Virgin of Mercy), who is said to have stopped an eruption of Cotopaxi volcano in 1742. The festival is also a celebration of the anniversary the city of Latacunga's independence.

== Origin ==
The festival of Mama Negra has origins in indigenous, Spanish, and African cultures. Two distinct themes are seen in the festival: that of the pre-Columbian era, from which stemmed the indigenous folklore characters, and that of colonialism, which brought Spanish and African cultural influences to Latacunga. Gradually created by many generations, the result presents characteristics of a traditional ceremony adjusted to incorporate aspects of Christian religious ceremonies introduced by the Spanish Conquest.

In 1742, the Virgen de la Merced allegedly stopped the eruption of Cotopaxi volcano, and was proclaimed "Advocate and Patron of the Volcano" by the residents of Latacunga, who pledged to celebrate an annual fiesta in her honor.

== Celebration ==
The Mama Negra festival takes place at the end of September, when the Catholic Church commemorates the Virgen de la Merced, and for a second time in November, when Latacunga celebrates the anniversary of its independence. Features of the celebration include bands of musicians, dancing, and a parade of familiar characters representing folklore, military and religious figures.
