= Zdenscka Bacarreza =

Bolivian football manager

Zdenscka Bacarreza Pinilla (born 30 May 1974) is a Bolivian football manager.

== Early life ==
Bacarreza started playing football at a young age through her grandfather. She dressed up as a boy to play football.

== Education ==
Bacarreza obtained a sports journalism diploma in Cuba.

== Playing career ==
Bacarreza played for the Bolivia women's national football team.

== Managerial career ==
Bacarreza worked as manager of the Bolivia women's national football team and attended several FIFA and CONMEBOL coaching courses. She founded Bolivian football academy Las Súper Poderosas with Carmen Pozo.

== Personal life ==
Bacarreza has three children. She has been married to sports journalist Fernando Berdeja.
