= Laura Cosme =

Colombian footballer (born 1992)

Personal information
- Full name: Laura Marcela Cosme Rodríguez
- Date of birth: 5 March 1992 (age 34)
- Height: 1.54 m (5 ft 1 in)
- Position: Forward

Senior career*
Years	Team	Apps	(Gls)
- CD Palmiranas

International career^{‡}
	Colombia	5	(1)
- * Club domestic league appearances and goals ‡ National team caps and goals as of 6 June 2015 (before the 2015 FIFA Women's World Cup)

Laura Marcela Cosme Rodríguez (born 5 March 1992) is a Colombian footballer who plays as a forward for the Colombia women's national football team. She was part of the team at the 2015 FIFA Women's World Cup. On club level she plays for CD Palmiranas in Colombia.
