= Andrea Peralta =

Colombian footballer (born 1988)

Personal information
- Full name: Andrea Paola Peralta Delgado
- Date of birth: 9 May 1988 (age 38)
- Height: 1.56 m (5 ft 1 in)
- Positions: Midfielder; defender

Team information
- Current team: Santa Fe
- Number: 2

Senior career*
Years	Team	Apps	(Gls)
- Club Deportivo Estudiantes F.C.
2012	XV de Piracicaba		
- Atlético Huila
2019	Audax	8	(0)
2021–	Santa Fe	5	(0)

International career^{‡}
	Colombia	17	(14)
- * Club domestic league appearances and goals as of 18 May 2022 ‡ National team caps and goals as of 26 June 2011 (before the 2011 FIFA Women's World Cup)

Andrea Paola Peralta Delgado (born 9 May 1988) is a Colombian professional footballer who plays as a midfielder for Independiente Santa Fe. She has been a member of the Colombia women's national team. She was part of the team at the 2011 FIFA Women's World Cup. On club level she plays for Club Deportivo Estudiantes F.C. in Colombia.
