= Yuli Muñoz =

Colombian footballer (born 1989)

Personal information
- Full name: Yuli Paola Muñoz Carvajal
- Date of birth: 18 March 1989 (age 37)
- Height: 1.66 m (5 ft 5 in)
- Position: Defender

Senior career*
Years	Team	Apps	(Gls)
- Club Deportivo Estudiantes F.C.

International career^{‡}
	Colombia	14	(1)
- * Club domestic league appearances and goals ‡ National team caps and goals as of 26 June 2011 (before the 2011 FIFA Women's World Cup)

Yuli Paola Muñoz Carvajal (born 18 March 1989) is a Colombian footballer who played as a defender. She was part of the team at the 2011 FIFA Women's World Cup. At the club level, she plays for Club Deportivo Estudiantes F.C. in Colombia.
