= Estadio Federativo Reina del Cisne =

Multi-use stadium in Loja, Ecuador

Federativo Reina del Cisne
- Interactive map of Federativo Reina del Cisne
- Full name: Estadio Federativo Reina del Cisne
- Location: Loja, Ecuador
- Coordinates: 4°00′04″S 79°11′47″W
- Capacity: 14,935
- Surface: grass

Construction
- Opened: 1980

Tenant
- Libertad

Estadio Federativo Reina del Cisne is a multi-use stadium in Loja, Ecuador. It is currently used mostly for football matches and is the home stadium of Libertad of the Ecuadorian Liga Pro Serie A. The stadium holds 14,935 spectators and opened in 1980.
