= Estadio Alejandro Serrano Aguilar =

Multi-purpose stadium in Cuenca, Ecuador

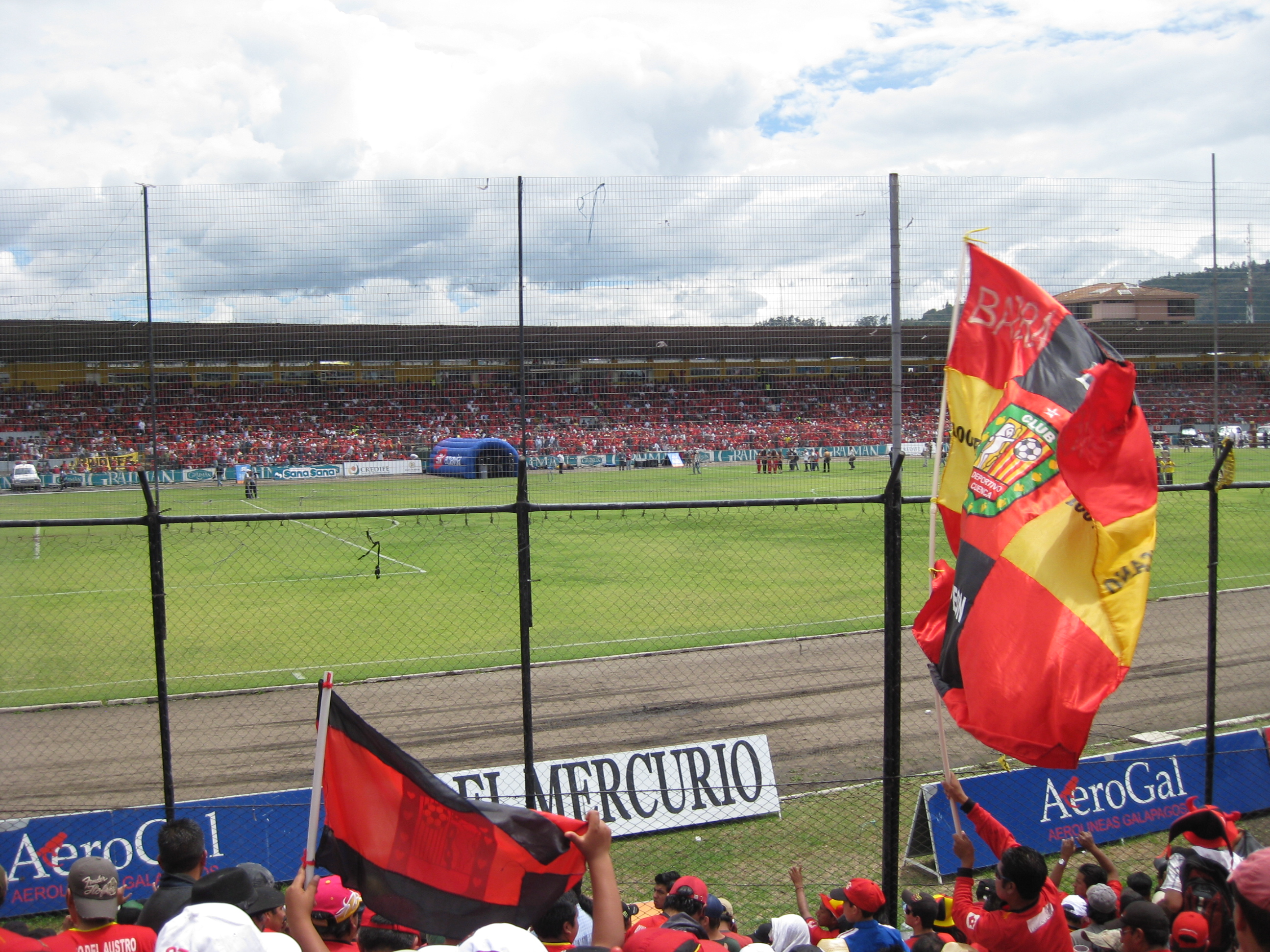
- Stadium in 2011
- Interactive map of Estadio Alejandro Serrano Aguilar
- Full name: Estadio Alejandro Serrano Aguilar Banco del Austro
- Location: Cuenca, Ecuador
- Coordinates: 02°54′26″S 79°00′20″W
- Capacity: 16,540
- Surface: grass

Construction
- Opened: 1945

Tenants
- Club Deportivo Cuenca; Liga Deportiva Universitaria de Cuenca; Cuenca Juniors

Estadio Alejandro Serrano Aguilar Banco del Austro is a multi-purpose stadium in Cuenca, Ecuador. It is currently used mostly for football matches and is the home stadium of Club Deportivo Cuenca and Liga Deportiva Universitaria de Cuenca. The stadium holds 16,540 spectators and opened in 1945.
