= Estadio La Cocha =

Coordinates: 0.924271°S 78.614559°W

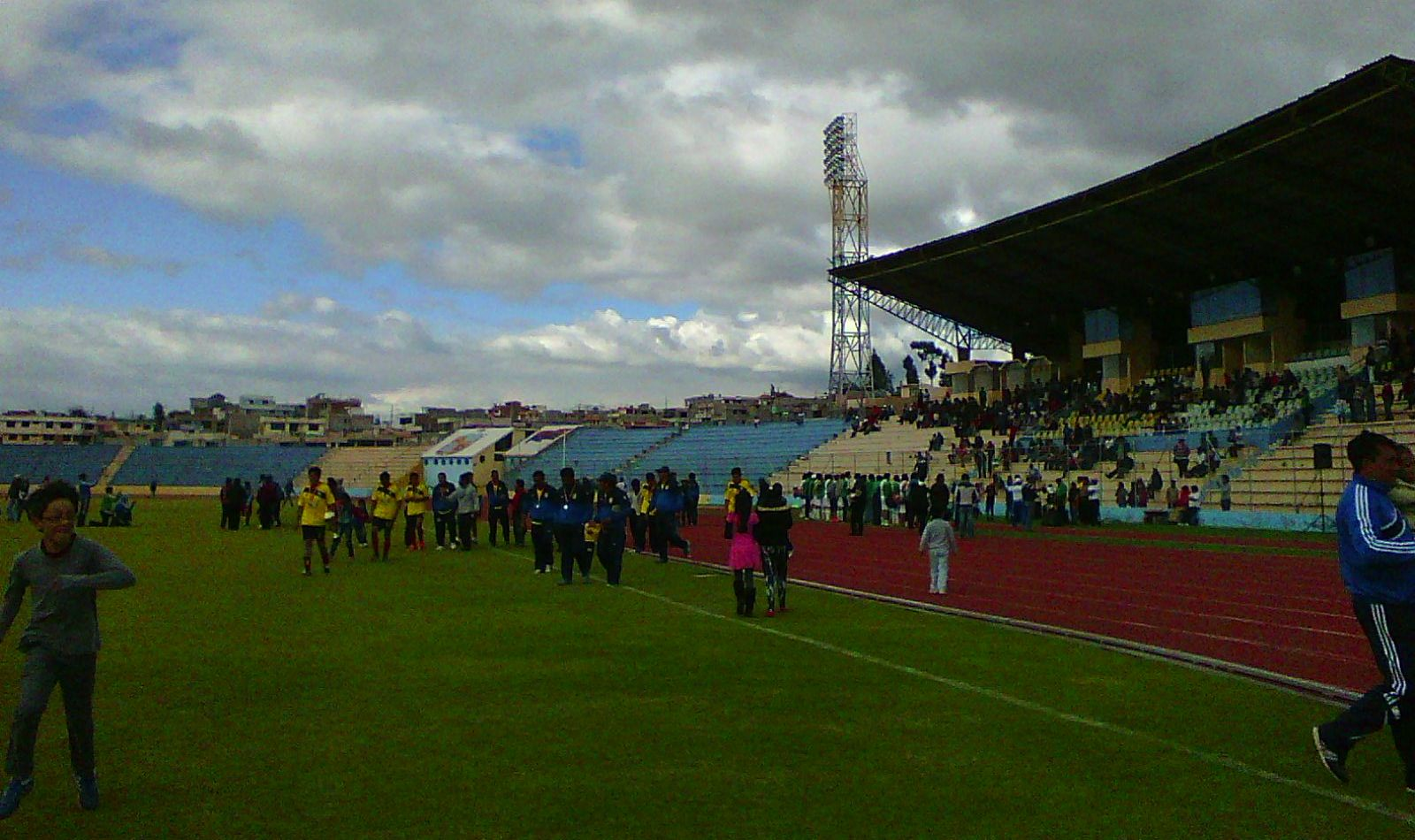
Cancha estadio La Cocha

Estadio Municipal La Cocha is a multi-use stadium in Latacunga, Ecuador. It is currently used mostly for football matches and is the home stadium of Club Deportivo Universidad Técnica de Cotopaxi of the Serie B de Ecuador, and of Club Social y Deportivo Cotopaxi and Sociedad Deportiva Flamengo of the Segunda Categoría. The stadium holds 15,200 spectators and opened on 1 April 1982.
