= Latacunga =

- City
- San Vicente Mártir de Latacunga
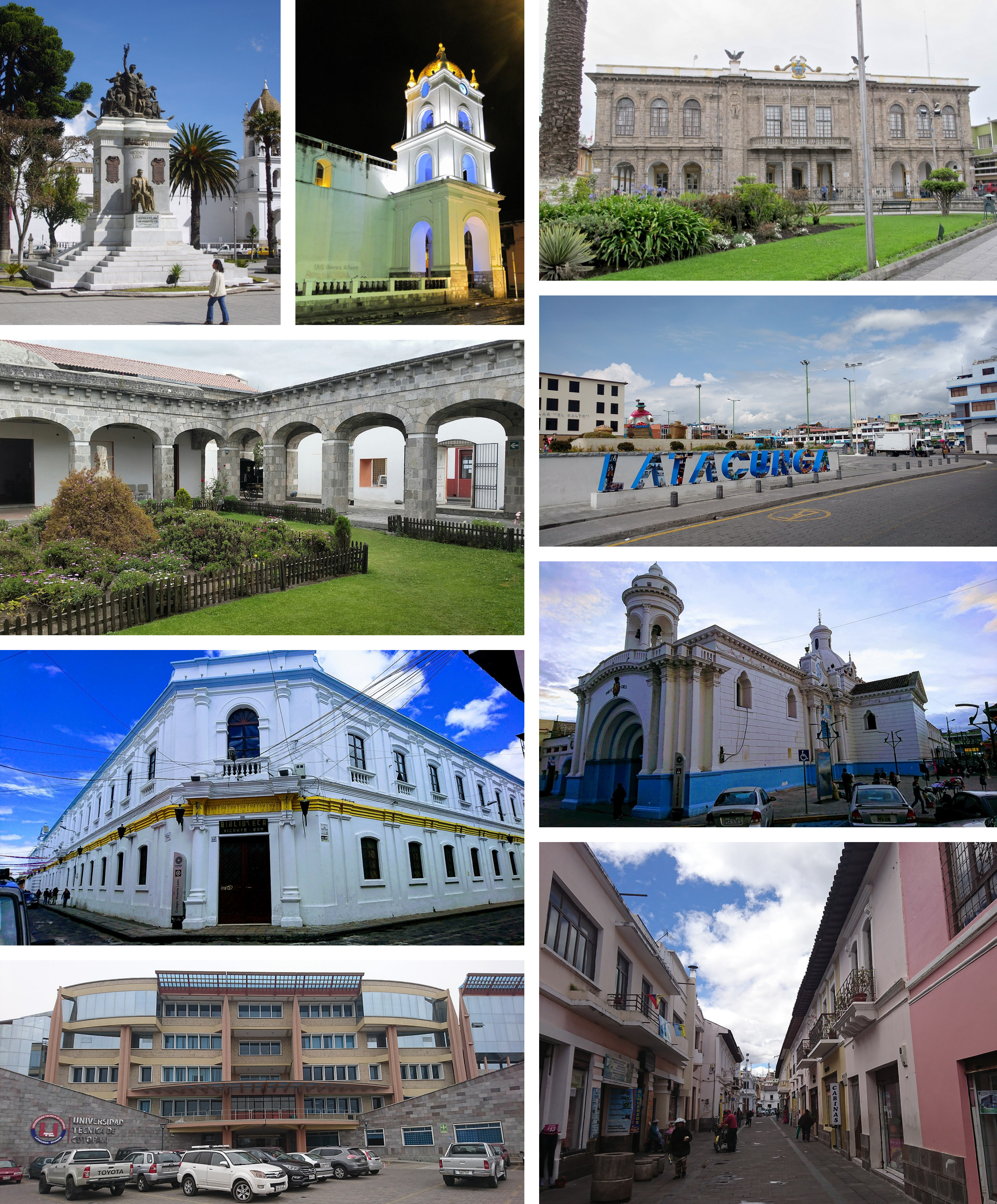
- From top, left to right: Central Park Vicente León, Saint Joseph Cathedral, City hall of Latacunga, the House of the Marquises, Chile Square, Vicente León High School, Our Lady of Mercy Church, Cotopaxi Technical University and Salcedo Street.

- Flag
- Nickname: Mashca City (Ciudad Mashca)
- Latacunga's location in Ecuador
- Coordinates: 0°55′54.98″S 78°36′57.88″W
- Country: Ecuador
- Province: Cotopaxi
- Canton: Latacunga
- Founded: April 12, 1557
- Founder: Antonio de Clavijo
- Named for: Llacta Cunani
- Parishes: Urban Parishes: La Matriz; Eloy ALfaro; Ignacio Flores; San Buenaventura; Juan Montalvo; Gil Ramírez Dávalos; Hermano Miguel

Government
  - Mayor: Fabricio Tinajero

Area
  - City: 19.99 km^{2} (7.72 sq mi)
- Elevation: 2,860 m (9,380 ft)

Population (2022 census)
  - City: 77,267
  - Density: 3,865/km^{2} (10,010/sq mi)
- Demonym: Latacungueño / a
- Time zone: UTC-5 (ECT)
- ZIP codes: Zip codes: 050157, 050151, 050152, 050101, 050102, 050153, 050154, 050103, 050104, 050155, 050150, 050156, 050163, 050158, 050105, 050159, 050160, 050161, 050162
- Area code: (+593) 3
- Website: Official website (in Spanish)

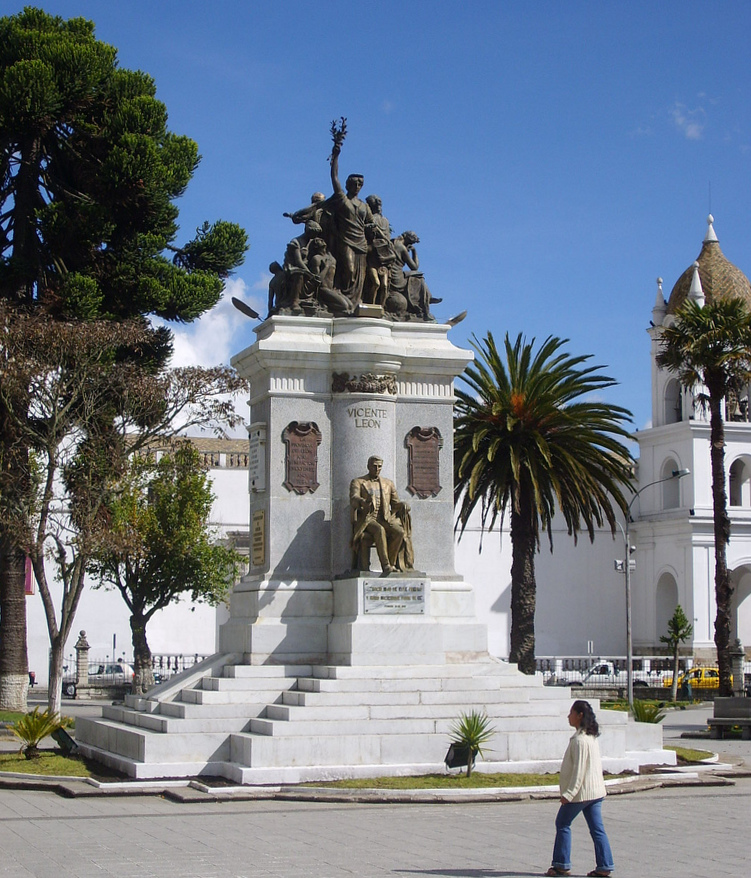
Monument to Vicente León on the main square of Latacunga

Latacunga (Spanish pronunciation: [lataˈkuŋɡa]; Quechua: Latakunga) is a plateau city of Ecuador, capital of the Cotopaxi Province, 89 km (55 mi) south of Quito, near the confluence of the Alaquez and Cutuchi rivers to form the Patate, the headstream of the Pastaza. At the time of census 2022 Latacunga had a population of 77,267 largely mestizo and indigenous.

Latacunga took its independence from Spain on November 11, 1820.

Latacunga is an hour and half south from Quito on the Pan-American Highway. It was previously also on the old road from Quito to Guayaquil, and has a railway station between those cities. It is 9, 383. 2 ft (2,860 m). above sea level. Its climate is cold and windy, due to the neighboring snowclad heights, and the barren, pumice-covered tableland on which it stands. The active volcano Cotopaxi is only 25 kilometres (16 mi) away, and the town has suffered repeatedly from eruptions. Founded in 1534, it was four times destroyed by earthquakes between 1698 and 1798. The neighboring ruins of an older native town are said to date from the Inca Empire.

Latacunga's most noted food is chugchucaras, empanadas, plantains, popcorn, and tostado (a type of toasted corn). Often, food is mixed with ají, a type of condiment that can be mild to very spicy depending on its preparation.

The Latacunga economy is dependent on agriculture, floriculture and commerce. It has an international airport, the Cotopaxi International Airport, that is not used for international passenger use, but as an Air Force base and some special commercial flights. The local volcanic activity has led to the accumulation of pumice deposits which are currently mined, as well as the presence of natural sparkling water, which is bottled under the brand name San Felipe.

The airplane scene in the film Maria Full of Grace was filmed out of the Latacunga airport using local extras. The landscape seen from the plane is the area surrounding Latacunga.

== Traditional festivals ==
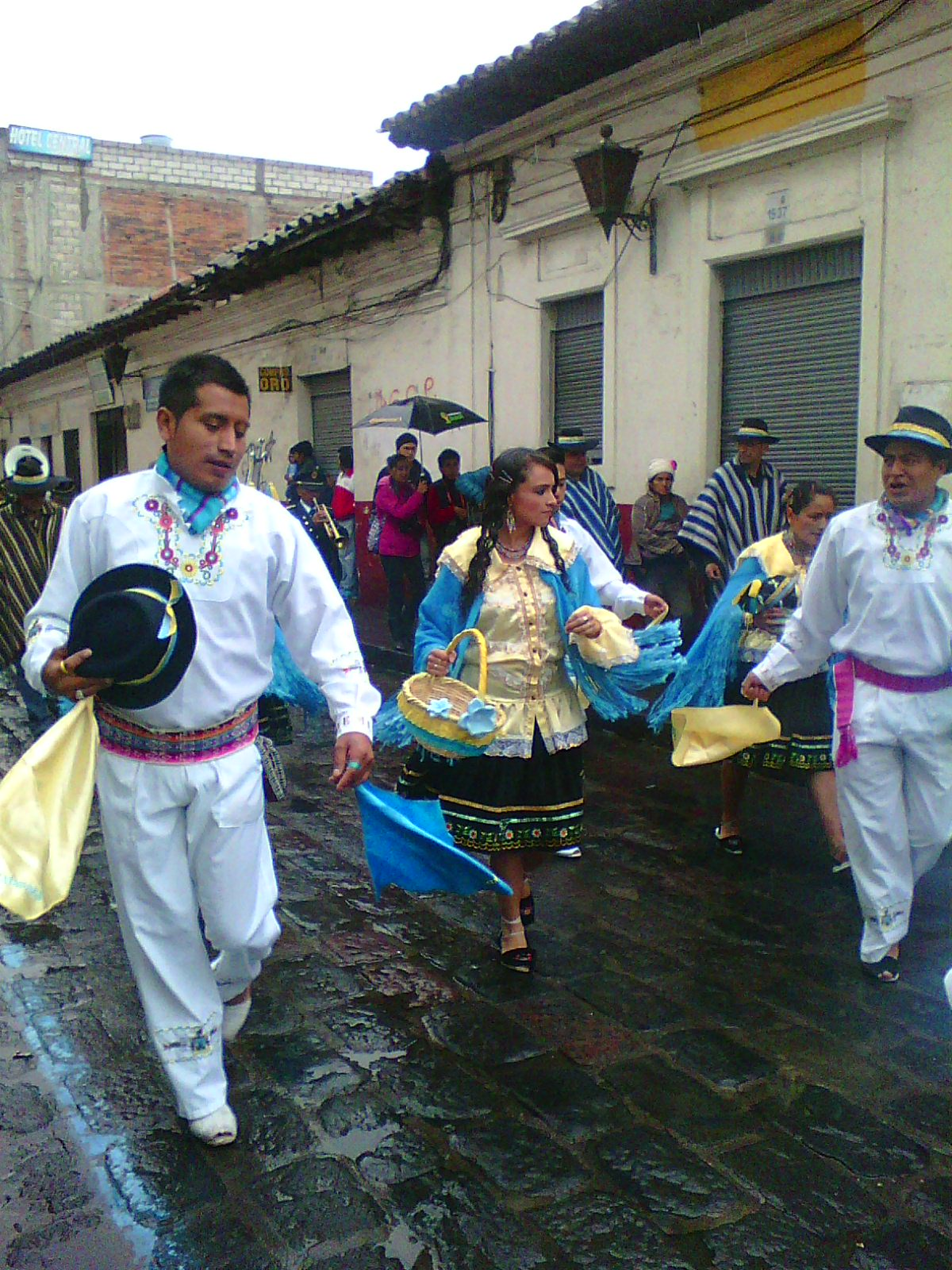
Parade in Latacunga city

La Fiesta de la Mama Negra is a well-known traditional festival in Latacunga. It takes place twice a year, and originates from a mixture of indigenous, Spanish and African influences. The first one was organized in September by the people from the markets "La Merced y Del Salto" in honor of the Virgin of Mercy, Virgen de la Merced. The Virgin is venerated because she allegedly stopped the Cotopaxi Volcano eruption in 1742. Inhabitants of Latacunga call her Abogada y patrona del volcan, meaning "advocate and patron of the volcano".

The second celebration is a party which Latacunga's inhabitants celebrate every year on Ecuador's Independence Day. It is a parade with the participation of well-known people, the army, clergy and others.

Both of these fiestas include a lengthy parade of various cultural characters, all dressed-up in various colors. The 'mama negra' is the last person to pass through, which is the culmination of each parade. It is a person with their face painted in black, riding a horse, and spraying the crowd with milk. Homemade strong alcoholic drinks are freely passed between one another along the parade route, which can be quite chaotic, closing the road at times and making the route impassable.

== Historic downtown ==
Latacunga's historic downtown extends about 30 squares. Prominent buildings to visit are:

- Saint Francis's church, the first church built in the city.
- The municipal palace; it was built with pumice stone in a neoclassical style.
- The Main Square in which stands a statue of Dr. Vicente Leon.

== Climate ==
Latacunga features an Oceanic climate (Cfb) under Köppen climate classification.

Climate data for Latacunga, elevation 2,785 m (9,137 ft), (2016–2025 normals)
Month	Jan	Feb	Mar	Apr	May	Jun	Jul	Aug	Sep	Oct	Nov	Dec	Year
Mean daily maximum °C (°F)	18.8 (65.8)	18.9 (66.0)	18.4 (65.1)	18.2 (64.8)	17.6 (63.7)	17.1 (62.8)	16.7 (62.1)	17.5 (63.5)	18.1 (64.6)	18.9 (66.0)	19.5 (67.1)	19.0 (66.2)	18.2 (64.8)
Daily mean °C (°F)	13.6 (56.5)	13.9 (57.0)	13.6 (56.5)	13.3 (55.9)	13.1 (55.6)	12.5 (54.5)	12.0 (53.6)	12.0 (53.6)	12.0 (53.6)	13.2 (55.8)	13.7 (56.7)	13.5 (56.3)	13.0 (55.5)
Mean daily minimum °C (°F)	8.4 (47.1)	9.0 (48.2)	8.8 (47.8)	8.3 (46.9)	8.6 (47.5)	7.9 (46.2)	7.4 (45.3)	6.5 (43.7)	6.0 (42.8)	7.5 (45.5)	8.0 (46.4)	8.1 (46.6)	7.9 (46.2)
Average precipitation mm (inches)	30 (1.2)	53 (2.1)	54 (2.1)	66 (2.6)	40 (1.6)	28 (1.1)	15 (0.6)	15 (0.6)	25 (1.0)	55 (2.2)	52 (2.0)	42 (1.7)	475 (18.8)
Average relative humidity (%)	72	73	76	77	76	77	76	74	73	73	72	70	74
Source 1: IEM
Source 2: FAO (precipitation and humidity 1971–2000)

== Universities ==
- Cotopaxi Technical University.
- ESPE University of the Military Forces.

== Sports ==
- Club Deportivo Universidad Tecnica de Cotopaxi, is a soccer team of Latacunga City.
- Sociedad Deportiva Flamengo is the city's football (soccer) club. They play their home games at Estadio La Cocha.

== Transport ==
- Cotopaxi International Airport
