= Estadio Jorge Andrade =

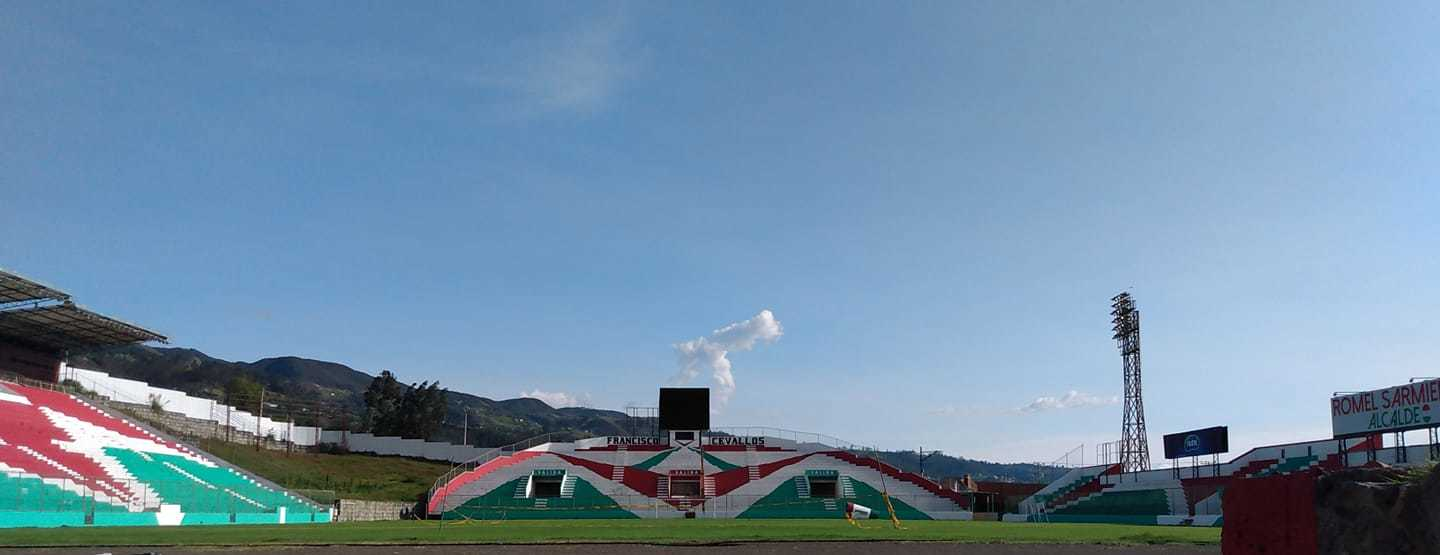
- Stadium in 2021
- Interactive map of Estadio Jorge Andrade
- Full name: Estadio Jorge Andrade Cantos
- Location: Azogues, Ecuador
- Coordinates: 2°44′59″S 78°50′37″W
- Capacity: 14,000
- Surface: grass

Construction
- Opened: 1984

Tenants
- Deportivo Azogues; Gualaceo

Estadio Jorge Andrade is a multi-use stadium in Azogues, Ecuador. It is currently used mostly for football matches and is the home stadium of Deportivo Azogues and Gualaceo. The stadium holds 14,000 people and opened in 1984. Because of the capacity requirements of the Serie B and Segunda División, the stadium is being used in place of the regular stadium, Estadio Federativo.
