= Estadio Bellavista =

Stadium in Ecuador

Coordinates: 01°14′41″S 78°37′23″W

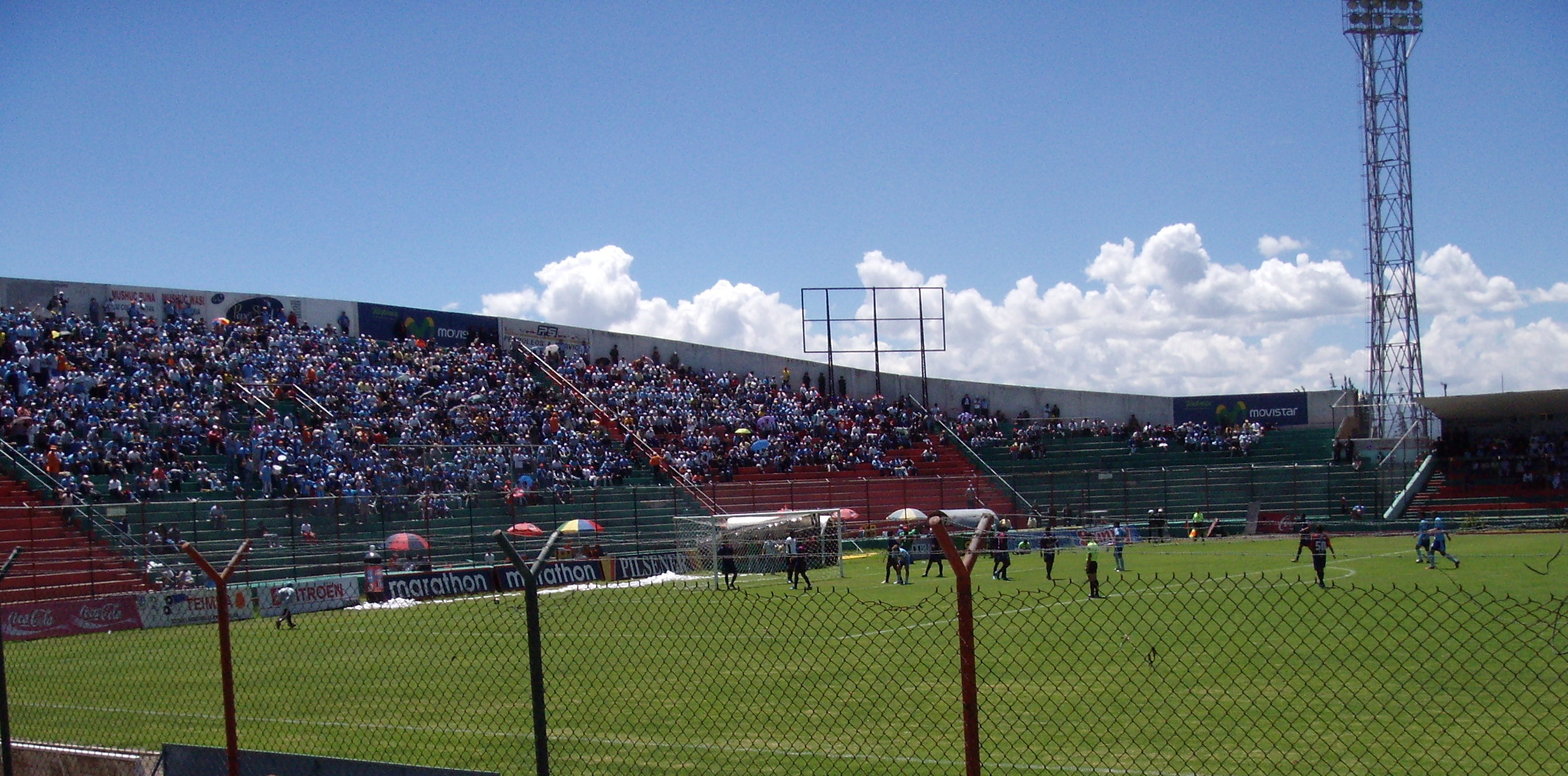
- Interactive map of Estadio Bellavista
- Location: Ambato, Ecuador
- Owner: Federación Deportiva de Tungurahua
- Operator: Federación Deportiva de Tungurahua
- Capacity: 16,467
- Surface: Grass

Construction
- Opened: July 24, 1945
- Renovated: July 24, 1950; 1989; 1993

Tenants
- Macará; Técnico Universitario; Mushuc Runa

Estadio Bellavista is a multi-use stadium in Ambato, Ecuador. It is used mostly for football matches and is the home stadium of Mushuc Runa, Macará, and Técnico Universitario. The stadium holds 16,467 spectators and is located on Bolivariana Avenue, a main thoroughfare through the city of Ambato.

== History ==
The stadium was built in 1945 and inaugurated in July of the same year. The stadium was damaged by the earthquake that hit Ambato on August 5, 1949. It underwent a renovation and was reopened the next year. In 1993, Estadio Bellavista was one of the locations for Copa America games. Ambato played host to Venezuela, United States, and Uruguay.
