= Bolivia women's national football team =

Women's national association football team representing Bolivia

Bolivia
- Nickname: La Verde (The Green one)
- Association: Federación Boliviana de Fútbol (FBF)
- Confederation: CONMEBOL (South America)
- Captain: Janeth Morón
- Most caps: Lurde Silisque (24)
- Top scorer: María Velásquez (14)
- Home stadium: Estadio Hernando Siles
- FIFA code: BOL
First colours	Second colours

FIFA ranking
- Current: 112 ▼3 (16 June 2026)
- Highest: 79 (July 2003; December 2017)
- Lowest: 109 (August 2025)

First international
- Bolivia 0–11 Chile (Uberlândia, Brazil; 8 January 1995)

Biggest win
- Bolivia 7–1 Chile (Lima, Peru; 11 April 2003)

Biggest defeat
- Brazil 15–0 Bolivia (Uberlândia, Brazil; 18 January 1995)

Copa América
- Appearances: 9 (first in 1995)
- Best result: Group stage (1995, 1998, 2003, 2006, 2010, 2014, 2018, 2022, 2025)

The Bolivia women's national football team (Spanish: selección femenina de fútbol de Bolivia) represents Bolivia in international women's football and is controlled by the Federación Boliviana de Fútbol. Bolivia has never qualified for a World Cup and has been always eliminated in the Group Stage in the Sudamericano Femenino. Also, most of Bolivia's matches are at Sudamericano Femenino or Bolivarian Games.

== Team image ==
=== Nicknames ===
The Bolivia women's national football team has been known or nicknamed as the "La Verde (The Green one)".

=== Home stadium ===
Bolivia plays their home matches on the Estadio Hernando Siles.

== Head-to-head record ==
As of 1 January 2014
Counted for the FIFA A-level matches only.

Nations	First Played	P	W	D	L	GF	GA	GD	Confederation
Argentina	1995	6	0	0	6	0	37	−37	CONMEBOL
Brazil	1995	5	0	0	5	1	40	−39	CONMEBOL
Chile	1995	6	1	0	5	7	25	−18	CONMEBOL
Colombia	2005	3	0	0	3	3	10	−7	CONMEBOL
Dominican Republic	2022	2	0	1	1	1	4	-3	CONCACAF
Ecuador	1995	11	1	1	9	15	37	−22	CONMEBOL
Paraguay	1998	4	0	0	4	5	20	−15	CONMEBOL
Peru	2003	6	1	1	4	6	13	−7	CONMEBOL
Uruguay	1998	3	0	1	2	1	13	-12	CONMEBOL
Venezuela	2005	4	1	1	2	4	4	0	CONMEBOL

== Results and fixtures ==
The following is a list of match results in the last 12 months, as well as any future matches that have been scheduled.

Legend

Win Draw Loss Fixture

=== 2025 ===
24 October 2025–26 CONMEBOL Liga de Naciones Femenina	Bolivia	0–4	Ecuador	El Alto, Bolivia
17:00 UTC−4			3' Rodríguez; 50' Cedeño; 78' Barahona; 86' Flores	Stadium: Estadio Municipal de El Alto

28 October 2025–26 CONMEBOL Liga de Naciones Femenina	Chile	5–0	Bolivia	Rancagua, Chile
18:00 UTC−3	Keefe 3', 9'; Pinilla 17'; Jiménez 45+1'; López 46'			Stadium: Estadio El Teniente

28 November Liga de Naciones	Bolivia	1-1	Colombia	El Alto, Bolivia
17:00 UTC−4	Turihuano 46'	Report (FIFA); Report (CONMEBOL)	Rodríguez 76'	Stadium: Estadio Municipal de El Alto; Referee: Stefani Escobar (Venezuela)

2 December Liga de Naciones	Argentina	8–0	Bolivia	Banfield, Argentina
20:00 UTC−3	Gramaglia 7', 51'; Cometti 31'; Bonsegundo 43' (pen.), 90+4'; Núñez 60', 89'; Altgelt 73'	Report (FIFA)		Stadium: Estadio Florencio Sola; Referee: Nadia Fuques (Uruguay)

=== 2026 ===
14 April 2025–26 CONMEBOL Liga de Naciones Femenina	Bolivia	1–2	Uruguay	El Alto, Bolivia
17:00 UTC−4	Veizaga 78'	Report	Pizarro 61', 87'	Stadium: Estadio Municipal de El Alto; Referee: Elizabeth Tintaya (Peru)

18 April 2025–26 CONMEBOL Liga de Naciones Femenina	Venezuela	8–0	Bolivia	Cabudare, Venezuela
19:00 UTC−4	Flórez 2'; García 45+1'; Olivieri 45+8'; Martinet 52', 75'; Moreno 68', 90+1'; Castellanos 84' (pen.)	Report		Stadium: Estadio Metropolitano de Cabudare; Referee: Nadia Fuques (Uruguay)

5 June 2025–26 CONMEBOL Liga de Naciones Femenina	Bolivia	0–8	Paraguay	El Alto, Bolivia
19:00 UTC−4		Report	C. Martínez 19', 23', 51', 58'; Chamorro 45+1'; Garay 48'; Fernández 52'; Ayala 73'	Stadium: Estadio Municipal de El Alto; Referee: Emikar Calderas (Venezuela)

9 June 2025–26 CONMEBOL Liga de Naciones Femenina	Peru	v	Bolivia	Callao, Peru
18:00 UTC−5		Report		Stadium: Estadio Miguel Grau; Referee: Paula Fernández (Colombia)

- Bolivia Results and Fixtures – Soccerway.com

== Coaching staff ==
=== Current coaching staff ===
As of 15 March 2024

Name	Role
Juan Mauricio Villarroel	coach

=== Manager history ===
Name	Period	Matches	Wins	Draws	Losses	Winning %	Notes
Zdenscka Bacarreza	?–	0	0	0	0	00.0%	
(Argentina) Rosana Gómez	2022–2023	0	0	0	0	00.0%	

== Players ==
=== Current squad ===
- The following 23 players were called up for the 2025–26 CONMEBOL Liga de Naciones match against Argentina on 2 December 2025.
- Caps and goals accurate up to and including 1 December 2025.

No.	Pos.	Player	Date of birth (age)	Club
1	GK	Jodi Medina	25 February 1999 (aged 26)	(United States Soccer Federation) Futbolera Select
12	GK	Alba Tamara Salazar		(Bolivian Football Federation)
22	GK	Alizia Cebarino		(Bolivian Football Federation)
2	DF	Karen Alejandra Rodríguez		(Bolivian Football Federation)
4	DF	Lizeth Mendiola		(Bolivian Football Federation)
5	DF	Flor Vaquero		(Bolivian Football Federation)
14	DF	Adela Camila Mariscal		(Bolivian Football Federation)
16	DF	Nissana Soruco		(Bolivian Football Federation)
18	DF	Eyda Juliana Serudo		(Bolivian Football Federation)
21	DF	Abigail Quiroz		(Bolivian Football Federation)
13	DF	María Isabel Rivera		(Bolivian Football Federation)
6	MF	Arya Ticona		(Bolivian Football Federation)
7	MF	[[Soliz {{{last}}}]]		(Bolivian Football Federation)
8	MF	Thalia Rueda		(Bolivian Football Federation)
10	MF	Ana Paula Rojas	17 July 1997 (aged 28)	(Bolivian Football Federation) Bolívar
10	MF	Mía Luz Kallar		(Bolivian Football Federation)
11	MF	[[Rodríguez {{{last}}}]]		(Bolivian Football Federation)
17	MF	Dome Sofia Hurtado		(Bolivian Football Federation)
20	MF	[[Turihuano {{{last}}}]]		(Bolivian Football Federation)
13	MF	Alisyn Belén Mamani		(Bolivian Football Federation)
7	FW	Marilin Rojas		(Bolivian Football Federation)
15	FW	Numi Isabella Miranda		(Bolivian Football Federation)
19	FW	Carla Ponce Méndez		(Bolivian Football Federation)

=== Recent call-ups ===
- The following players have been called up to a Bolivia squad in the past 12 months.

Pos.	Player	Date of birth (age)	Caps	Goals	Club	Latest call-up
GK	Wendy Mariel Campos		-	-	(Bolivia)	v. Chile,28 October 2025
GK	Belén Abril Ibarra		-	-	(Bolivia)	v. Chile,28 October 2025
GK	Jodi Medina	25 February 1999 (aged 26)	-	-	(United States) Futbolera Select	v. Chile,28 October 2025
DF	Yoselin Andrea Salvatierra		-	-	(Bolivia)	v. Chile,28 October 2025
DF	Flor Barceló Soliz		-	-	(Bolivia)	v. Chile,28 October 2025
DF	Aida Camila Mariscal		-	-	(Bolivia)	v. Chile,28 October 2025
DF	Vanesa Obelar		-	-	(Bolivia)	v. Chile,28 October 2025
DF	Sandra Torrico		-	-	(Bolivia)	v. Chile,28 October 2025
MF	Daniza Pinto		-	-	(Bolivia)	v. Chile,28 October 2025
MF	Nelly Criaballo	12 February 2007 (aged 18)	-	-	(Bolivia) Deportivo Trópico	v. Chile,28 October 2025
MF	Dione Murga		-	-	(Bolivia)	v. Chile,28 October 2025
MF	Talia Rueda		-	-	(Bolivia)	v. Chile,28 October 2025
MF	Yaneth Viveros	21 January 1993 (aged 32)	-	-	(Argentina) Rosario Central	v. Chile,28 October 2025
MF	Angelina Rivero	25 September 2008 (aged 17)	-	-	(Bolivia) Calleja	v. Chile,28 October 2025
MF	Anabel Flores	19 November 2005 (aged 19)	-	-	(Bolivia) Oriente Petrolero	v. Chile,28 October 2025
FW	Maiu Isabella Miranda		-	-	(Bolivia)	v. Chile,28 October 2025
FW	Jheinny Cuba		-	-	(Bolivia)	v. Chile,28 October 2025
FW	Nashy Segovia		-	-	(Bolivia)	v. Chile,28 October 2025
FW	Azul Bejarano		-	-	(Bolivia)	v. Chile,28 October 2025
FW	Emilie Doerksen	3 October 2001 (aged 24)	-	-	(United States) West Florida Argonauts	v. Chile,28 October 2025

=== Captains ===
- Janeth Morón (?– )

== Records ==
As of 23 February 2021
Players in bold are still active, at least at club level.

=== Most capped players ===
#	Name	Caps	Goals	Career
1	Lurde Silisque	24	?	?–?

=== Top goalscorers ===
#	Name	Goals	Caps	Ratio	Career
1	María Velásquez	14	?	1	?–?

== Competitive record ==
=== FIFA Women's World Cup ===
FIFA Women's World Cup record
Year	Result	Pld	W	D*	L	GF	GA
(China) 1991	Did not enter						
(Sweden) 1995	Did not qualify						
(United States) 1999	Did not qualify						
(United States) 2003	Did not qualify						
(China) 2007	Did not qualify						
(Germany) 2011	Did not qualify						
(Canada) 2015	Did not qualify						
(France) 2019	Did not qualify						
(Australia) (New Zealand) 2023	Did not qualify						
(Brazil) 2027	Did not qualify						
(Costa Rica) (Jamaica) (Mexico) (United States) 2031	To be determined						
(United Kingdom) 2035	To be determined						
Total	–	–	–	–	–	–	–

*Draws include knockout matches decided on penalty kicks.

=== Olympic Games ===
Summer Olympics record
Year	Result	Pld	W	D*	L	GF	GA
(United States) 1996	Did not qualify						
(Australia) 2000	Did not qualify						
(Greece) 2004	Did not qualify						
(China) 2008	Did not qualify						
(United Kingdom) 2012	Did not qualify						
(Brazil) 2016	Did not qualify						
(Japan) 2020	Did not qualify						
(France) 2024	Did not qualify						
Total	–	–	–	–	–	–	–

*Draws include knockout matches decided on penalty kicks.

=== CONMEBOL Copa América Femenina ===
CONMEBOL Copa América Femenina record
Year	Result	Pld	W	D*	L	GF	GA
(Brazil) 1991	Did not enter						
(Brazil) 1995	Group stage	4	0	0	4	1	44
(Argentina) 1998	Group stage	4	0	1	3	5	18
(Peru) (Argentina) (Ecuador) 2003	Group stage	2	1	0	1	8	4
(Argentina) 2006	Group stage	4	0	1	3	4	14
(Ecuador) 2010	Group stage	4	1	0	3	5	11
(Ecuador) 2014	Group stage	4	0	0	4	2	25
(Chile) 2018	Group stage	4	1	0	3	1	18
(Colombia) 2022	Group stage	4	0	0	4	1	16
(Ecuador) 2025	Group stage	4	0	0	4	1	25
Total	Group stage	34	3	2	29	28	175

*Draws include knockout matches decided on penalty kicks.

=== Pan American Games ===
Pan American Games record
Year	Result	Pld	W	D*	L	GF	GA
(Canada) 1999	Did not enter						
(Dominican Republic) 2003	Did not enter						
(Brazil) 2007	Did not enter						
(Mexico) 2011	Did not qualify						
(Canada) 2015	Did not qualify						
(Peru) 2019	Did not qualify						
(Chile) 2023	7th	4	1	1	2	2	10
(Colombia) 2027	To be determined						
Total	7th	4	1	1	2	2	10

*Draws include knockout matches decided on penalty kicks.

=== South American Games ===
South American Games record
Year	Result	Pld	W	D*	L	GF	GA
(Chile) 2014	Group stage	2	0	0	2	1	6
(Bolivia) 2018 to present	U-20 Tournament						
Total	Group stage	2	0	0	2	1	6

*Draws include knockout matches decided on penalty kicks.

=== Bolivarian Games ===
Bolivarian Games record
Year	Result	Pld	W	D*	L	GF	GA
(Colombia) 2005	Fourth place	6	1	0	5	6	15
(Bolivia) 2009	Fourth place	4	0	1	3	5	10
(Peru) 2013 to present	U-20 Tournament						
Total	Fourth place	10	1	1	8	11	25

*Draws include knockout matches decided on penalty kicks.

== See also ==
- Sport in Bolivia
  - Football in Bolivia
    - Women's football in Bolivia
- Bolivia men's national football team
