= Argentina women's national football team results =

Overview of the results of Spain's women's national football team

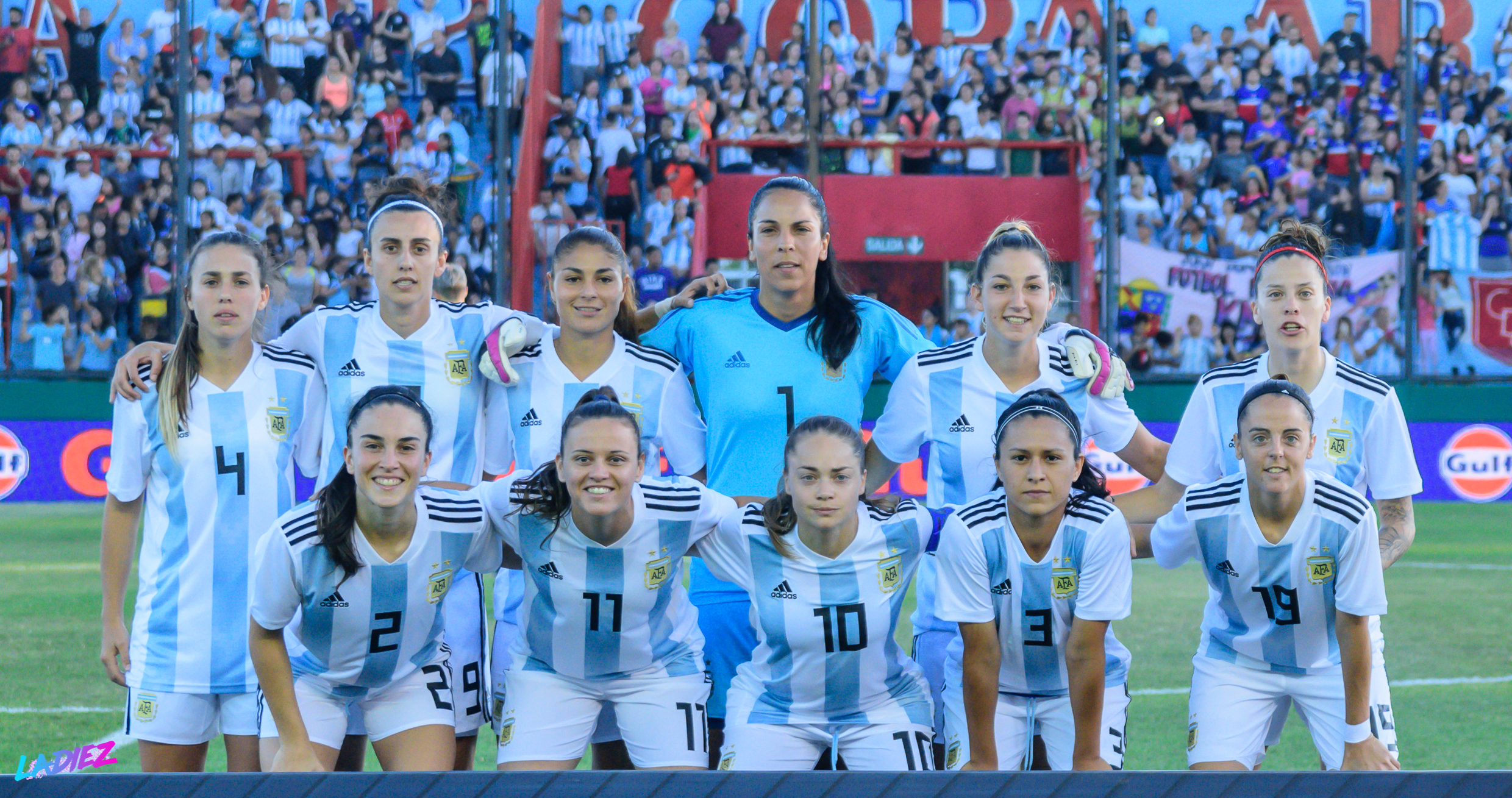
Argentina women's national team in 2018.

The Argentina women's national football team started play in 1971.

These are the Argentina women's national football team all time results:

== Results ==
Legend

Win Draw Loss Void or postponed Fixture

=== 1971 ===
Federación Argentina de Fútbol Femenino (FAFF)

| 18 July 1971 Unofficial friendly | Argentina | 3–2 | Mexico | Buenos Aires |
| | | Report | | Stadium: Estadio Nueva Chicago |

| 15 August 1971 1971 Women's World Cup | Mexico | 3–1 | Argentina |
| | Rubio 21', 54'; Hernández 30' | Report | Cardoso 34' | Attendance: 100,000; Referee: Giuseppe Cosentina |

| Argentina | 3–2 | Argentina |

| Argentina | 3–2 | Argentina |

| Argentina | 3–2 | Argentina |

=== 1993–1998 ===
Asociación del Fútbol Argentino (AFA)

| 3 December 1993 Copa Trasandina | Chile | 2–3 | Argentina | Santiago, Chile |
| | Cruz (?); Flores (?) | Report | Baca (?); Iacobellis (?); Meggers (?) | Stadium: Estadio Santa Laura |

| 10 January 1995 1995 South American Women's Football Championship | Argentina | 5–1 | Ecuador | Uberlândia, Brazil |
| | | | | Stadium: Parque do Sabiá |

| 12 January 1995 1995 South American Women's Football Championship | Argentina | 12–0 | Bolivia | Uberlândia, Brazil |
| | | | | Stadium: Parque do Sabiá |

| 14 January 1995 1995 South American Women's Football Championship | Brazil | 8–0 | Argentina | Uberlândia, Brazil |
| | | | | Stadium: Parque do Sabiá; Referee: Nestor Mondría (Chile) |

| 18 January 1995 1995 South American Women's Football Championship | Argentina | 1–0 | Chile | Uberlândia, Brazil |
| | | | | Stadium: Parque do Sabiá |

| 22 January 1995 1995 South American Women's Football Championship | Brazil | 0–2 | Argentina |
| | | | | Attendance: 50,000; Referee: Nestor Mondría (Chile) |

| 9 April 1995 Torneio Cidade de Uberlândia | Argentina | 0–7 | Australia | Uberlândia, Brazil |
| | | | | Stadium: Parque do Sabiá |

| 11 April 1995 Torneio Cidade de Uberlândia | Brazil | 4–1 | Argentina | Uberlândia, Brazil |
| | | | | Stadium: Parque do Sabiá |

| 3 February 1997 Fiendly match | Argentina | 3–1 | Uruguay | Mar de Plata |
| | | | | Stadium: Estadio José María Minella |

| 24 January 1998 Friendly match | Argentina | 4–0 | Uruguay | Mar de Plata |

| 5 February 1998 Friendly match | Argentina | 4–1 | Peru | Mar de Plata |

| 1 March 1998 1998 South American Women's Football Championship | Argentina | 9–0 | Bolivia | Mar de Plata |

| 3 March 1998 1998 South American Women's Football Championship | Argentina | 3–0 | Paraguay | Mar de Plata |

| 5 March 1998 1998 South American Women's Football Championship | Argentina | 2–1 | Uruguay | Mar de Plata |

| 9 March 1998 1998 South American Women's Football Championship | Argentina | 2–0 | Ecuador | Mar de Plata |

| 13 March 1998 1998 South American Women's Football Championship | Argentina | 1–1 (a.e.t.) (4–3 p) | Peru | Mar de Plata |

| 15 March 1998 1998 South American Women's Football Championship | Argentina | 1–7 | Brazil | Mar de Plata |

| 24 April 1998 Friendly match | United States | 8–1 | Argentina | Fullerton |

| 26 April 1998 Friendly match | United States | 7–0 | Argentina | San José |

| 13 September 1998 Friendly match | Argentina | 3–1 | Uruguay | Lanús |

| 29 September 1998 Friendly match | Argentina | 3–2 | Costa Rica | Avellaneda |

| 31 October 1998 Friendly match | Argentina | 4–1 | Peru | Vicente López |

| 21 November 1998 Friendly match | Argentina | 4–0 | Uruguay | Morón |

| 11 December 1998 1999 FIFA Women's World Cup qualification (CONCACAF–CONMEBOL play-off) | Mexico | 3–1 | Argentina | Toluca |
| | | | | Stadium: Estadio Nemesio Díez; Attendance: 3,000 |

| 19 December 1998 1999 FIFA Women's World Cup qualification (CONCACAF–CONMEBOL play-off) | Argentina | 2–3 | Mexico | Buenos Aires |
| | | | | Stadium: José Amalfitani Stadium |

=== 2000-2009 ===
| 25 March 2000 Friendly match | Argentina | 2–1 | New Zealand | Buenos Aires |

| 27 March 2000 Friendly match | Argentina | 1–1 | New Zealand | Buenos Aires |

| 23 May 2000 Copa Gallo | Argentina | 9–0 | Nicaragua | (Guatemala) |

| 25 May 2000 Copa Gallo | Argentina | 6–0 | El Salvador | (Guatemala) |

| 27 May 2000 Copa Gallo | Guatemala | 0–5 | Argentina | (Guatemala) |

| 5 December 2000 Copa Argentina | Argentina | 4–0 | Uruguay | Banfield |

| 7 December 2000 Copa Argentina | Argentina | 5–1 | Paraguay | Banfield |

| 9 December 2000 Copa Argentina | Argentina | 1–0 | Peru | Buenos Aires |

| 7 December 2001 Torneo Tres Naciones 2001 | Argentina | 7–0 | Ecuador | Lima |

| 9 December 2001 Torneo Tres Naciones 2001 | Peru | 0–1 | Argentina | Lima |

| 9 April 2003 2003 South American Women's Football Championship | Argentina | 3–0 | Paraguay | Salta |

| 13 April 2003 2003 South American Women's Football Championship | Argentina | 8–0 | Uruguay | Salta |

| 23 April 2003 2003 South American Women's Football Championship | Brazil | 3–2 | Argentina | Lima |

| 25 April 2003 2003 South American Women's Football Championship | Argentina | 3–2 | Colombia | Lima |

| 27 April 2003 2003 South American Women's Football Championship | Peru | 1–1 | Argentina | Lima |

| 30 May 2003 Torneo Tres Naciones 2003 | Mexico | 3–2 | Argentina | San José, Costa Rica |

| 3 June 2003 Torneo Tres Naciones 2003 | Costa Rica | 2–1 | Argentina | San José |

| 3 August 2003 Football at the 2003 Pan American Games – Women's tournament | Costa Rica | 2–4 | Argentina | San Cristóbal, Dominican Republic |
| | | | | Stadium: Estadio Panamericano |

| 8 August 2003 2003 South American Women's Football Championship | Argentina | 1–3 | Mexico | Santo Domingo |
| | | | | Stadium: Parque del Este |

| 11 August 2003 2003 South American Women's Football Championship | Brazil | 2–1 | Argentina | Santo Domingo |
| | | | | Stadium: Estadio Juan Pablo Duarte |

| 14 August 2003 2003 South American Women's Football Championship | Mexico | 1–4 | Argentina | Santo Domingo |
| | | | | Stadium: Estadio Juan Pablo Duarte |

| 13 September 2003 Friendly match | Argentina | 2–1 | South Korea | Los Ángeles, United States |

| 23 September 2003 2003 FIFA Women's World Cup | Japan | 6–0 | Argentina | Columbus, United States |
| 20:30 | Sawa 13', 38'; Yamamoto 64'; Otani 72', 75', 80' | Report | | Stadium: Columbus Crew Stadium; Attendance: 16,409; Referee: Katriina Elovirta (Finland) |

| 24 September 2003 2003 FIFA Women's World Cup | Canada | 3–0 | Argentina | Columbus, United States |
| 20:30 | Hooper 19' (pen.); Latham 79', 82' | Report | | Stadium: Columbus Crew Stadium; Attendance: 15,529; Referee: Nicole Petignat (Switzerland) |

| 27 September 2003 2003 FIFA Women's World Cup | Argentina | 1–6 | Germany | Washington, D.C., United States |
| 15:30 | Gaitán 71' | Report | Meinert 3', 43'; Wiegmann 24' (pen.); Prinz 32'; Pohlers 89'; Müller 90+2' | Stadium: Robert F. Kennedy Memorial Stadium; Attendance: 17,618; Referee: Bola Elizabeth Abidoye (Nigeria) |

| 1 April 2005 Friendly match | Chile | 0–6 | Argentina | Santiago |

| 3 April 2005 Friendly match | Chile | 0–6 | Argentina | Santiago |

| 17 July 2005 Friendly match | Argentina | 4–0 | Uruguay | Ezeiza |

| 13 September 2003 Friendly match | Uruguay | 0–4 | Argentina | Montevideo |

| 16 August 2005 Torneo Tres Naciones 2005 | Argentina | 2–0 | Paraguay | Buenos Aires |

| 18 August 2005 Torneo Tres Naciones 2005 | Argentina | 2–2 | Mexico | Buenos Aires |

| 2 September 2005 Unofficial friendly | Basque Country | 2–4 | Argentina | Irun |
| 18:15 | Del Ama 33'; Azagra 45' | Report | Gómez 20', 85' (pen.); Ferretti 66'; Potassa 70' | Stadium: Stadium Gal; Referee: Miguel Ángel Pérez Lasa |

| 10 November 2006 2006 South American Women's Football Championship | Argentina | 2–1 | Uruguay | Mar de Plata |
| 15:00 | Almeida 4'; Potassa 63' | | Souza 11' | Stadium: Estadio José María Minella; Referee: Norma González (Paraguay) |

| 12 November 2006 2006 South American Women's Football Championship | Argentina | 8–0 | Chile | Mar de Plata |
| 15:00 | Potassa 4', 22'; Coronel 8'; Almeida 27'; Ojeda 30'; Gómez 70'; Huber 79'; Hirmbruchner 86' | | | Stadium: Estadio José María Minella; Referee: Cándida Colque (Bolivia) |

| 14 November 2006 2006 South American Women's Football Championship | Argentina | 1–0 | Ecuador | Mar de Plata |
| 17:15 | Gómez 54' | | | Stadium: Estadio José María Minella; Referee: María Alvarado (Bolivia) |

| 18 November 2006 2006 South American Women's Football Championship | Argentina | 6–0 | Colombia | Mar de Plata |
| 17:15 | Gómez 3'; Vallejos 21', 52'; Quiñones 27'; Huber 46'; Ojeda 57' | | | Stadium: Estadio José María Minella; Referee: Marilyn Ángulo (Venezuela) |

| 22 November 2006 2006 South American Women's Football Championship | Argentina | 0–0 | Paraguay | Mar de Plata |
| | | | | Stadium: Estadio José María Minella; Referee: María Alvarado (Bolivia) |

| 24 November 2006 2006 South American Women's Football Championship | Argentina | 2–0 | Uruguay | Mar de Plata |
| | Gerez 71'; Manicler 76' | | | Stadium: Estadio José María Minella; Referee: Cándida Colque (Bolivia) |

| 26 November 2006 2006 South American Women's Football Championship | Argentina | 2–0 | Brazil | Mar de Plata |
| 17:15 | González 66'; Potassa 68' | | | Stadium: Estadio José María Minella; Referee: Patricia da Silva (referee) (Uruguay) |

| 6 April 2007 Unofficial friendly | Argentina | 4–2 | Basque Country | Buenos Aires |
| 16:00 | Potassa 12'; Ojeda 17'; Coronel 60'; Vallejos 85' | Report | Rodríguez 63'; Ferreira 75' | Stadium: Estadio Juan Pasquale |

=== 2010-2019 ===
| 15 January 2010 Copa Bicentenario de Chile | Colombia | 0–0 | Argentina | Coquimbo, Chile |
| | | | | Stadium: Estadio Municipal Francisco Sánchez Rumoroso |

| 19 January 2010 Copa Bicentenario de Chile | Chile | 0–0 | Argentina | Coquimbo |
| | | | | Stadium: Estadio Municipal Francisco Sánchez Rumoroso |

| 21 January 2010 Copa Bicentenario de Chile | Denmark | 1–0 | Argentina | Coquimbo, Chile |
| | | | | Stadium: Estadio Municipal Francisco Sánchez Rumoroso |

| 23 January 2010 Copa Bicentenario de Chile | Argentina | 0–3 | Japan | Coquimbo, Chile |
| | | | | Stadium: Estadio Municipal Francisco Sánchez Rumoroso |

| 8 March 2014 2014 South American Games Group Stage | Chile | 0-1 | Argentina | Estadio Bicentenario de La Florida, Santiago |
| | Moroso 26' |

| 10 March 2014 2014 South American Games Group Stage | Argentina | 4-0 | Bolivia | Estadio Bicentenario de La Florida, Santiago |
| | Quiñones 10'; Larroquette 37'; Banini 57'; Pereyra 86' |

| 14 March 2014 2014 South American Games Semi-Final | Brazil | 0-0 (3–5 p) | Argentina | Estadio Bicentenario de La Florida, Santiago |
| 18:00 |
| | Penalties |
| | Cristiane (penalty missed); Bia Vaz (penalty scored); Tamires (penalty scored); Poliana (penalty scored) | | (penalty scored) Vallejos; (penalty scored) Larroquete; (penalty scored) Banini; (penalty scored) Espíndola; (penalty scored) Pereyra |

| 16 March 2014 2014 South American Games Gold Medal Match | Argentina | 2-1 | Chile | Estadio Bicentenario de La Florida, Santiago |
| 18:00 | Banini 45'; Yael Oviedo 67' | | Fernanda Araya 57' |

| 4 August 2014 Friendly | Argentina | 2-1 | Peru |
| 18:00 |

| 12 September 2014 2014 Copa América First Stage | Argentina | 0-1 | Chile | Estadio Federativo Reina del Cisne, Loja |
| 17:00 | | | Lara 47' | Referee: Gabriela Bandeira (Uruguay) |

| 14 September 2014 2014 Copa América First Stage | Bolivia | 0-6 | Argentina | Estadio Bellavista, Ambato |
| 13:00 | | | Vallejos 50', 72'; Bonsegundo 54'; Larroquette 62', 77', 87' | Referee: Yercinia Correa (Venezuela) |

| 16 September 2014 2014 Copa América First Stage | Argentina | 1-0 | Paraguay | Estadio Alejandro Serrano Aguilar, Cuenca |
| 19:00 | Cabrera 9' | | | Referee: Viviana Muñoz (Colombia) |

| 20 September 2014 2014 Copa América First Stage | Brazil | 0-2 | Argentina | Estadio Jorge Andrade, Azogues |
| 16:00 | | | Cometti 23'; Banini 73' (pen.) | Referee: Gabriela Bandeira (Uruguay) |

| 24 September 2014 2014 Copa América Final Stage | Colombia | 0-0 | Argentina | Estadio Chillogallo, Quito |
| 13:00 | | | | Referee: Sirley Cornejo (Bolivia) |

| 26 September 2014 2014 Copa América Final Stage | Brazil | 6-0 | Argentina | Estadio Rumiñahui, Sangolquí |
| 18:00 | Cristiane 32'; Andressa Alves 36'; Maurine 58'; Tayla 66'; Tamires 71'; Raquel 84' | | | Referee: María Belén Carvajal (Chile) |

| 28 September 2014 2014 Copa América Final Stage | Argentina | 2-3 | Ecuador | Estadio Olímpico Atahualpa, Quito |
| 10:00 | Banini 25'; Bonsegundo 30' | | Caicedo 36'; Rodríguez 60'; Lattanzio 77' | Referee: Zulma Quiñónez (Paraguay) |

| 10 December 2014 Torneio Internacional de Brasília de Futebol Feminino Group Stage | Brazil | 4-0 | Argentina | Estádio Nacional Mané Garrincha |
| 21:50 | Debinha 14'; Formiga 41', 82'; Raquel 78' | | | Attendance: 1,603 |

| 14 December 2014 Torneio Internacional de Brasília de Futebol Feminino Group Stage | Argentina | 0-6 | China | Estádio Nacional Mané Garrincha |
| 16:00 | | | Wang Shuang 49'; Tang Jiali 52'; Gu Yasha 64'; Zhang Rui 85', 88', 90' | Attendance: 2,710 |

| 18 December 2014 Torneio Internacional de Brasília de Futebol Feminino Group Stage | United States | 7-0 | Argentina | Estádio Nacional Mané Garrincha |
| 19:30 | Press 9', 23', 41', 78'; Lloyd 30', 44', 47' | | | Attendance: 1,717 |

| 21 December 2014 Torneio Internacional de Brasília de Futebol Feminino Third Place Match | China | 0-0 | Argentina | Estádio Nacional Mané Garrincha |
| 16:00 |
Note: No penalty shoot-out were held. If tied, the team with better group stage record wins the match. Thus China finished third

| 11 July 2015 2015 Pan American Games Group Stage | Argentina | 2-2 | Trinidad and Tobago | Hamilton Pan Am Soccer Stadium, Hamilton |
| 14:05 | Larroquette 53'; Potassa 88' | | Shade 59'; Atthin-Johnson 90' |

| 14 July 2015 2015 Pan American Games Group Stage | Argentina | 1-3 | Mexico | Hamilton Pan Am Soccer Stadium, Hamilton |
| 17:35 | Bonsegundo 82' | | Noyola 1'; Rangel 73'; Ruiz 76' |

| 18 July 2015 2015 Pan American Games Group Stage | Argentina | 0-2 | Colombia | Hamilton Pan Am Soccer Stadium, Hamilton |
| 20:35 | | | Arias 44'; Usme 51' |

| 24 October 2017 Friendly | Argentina | 0-5 | Chile |

| 5 April 2018 2018 Copa América First Stage | Brazil | 3-1 | Argentina | Estadio Municipal Francisco Sánchez Rumoroso, Coquimbo |
| 19:00 | Bia Zaneratto 17'; Cristiane 57' (pen.); Debinha 90' | | Banini 54' | Referee: Claudia Umpiérrez (Uruguay) |

| 7 April 2018 2018 Copa América First Stage | Argentina | 3-0 | Bolivia | Estadio Municipal Francisco Sánchez Rumoroso, Coquimbo |
| 16:45 | Jaimes 33' (pen.), 39'; Larroquette 71' | | | Referee: Elizabeth Tintaya (Peru) |

| 9 April 2018 2018 Copa América First Stage | Ecuador | 3-6 | Argentina | Estadio Municipal Francisco Sánchez Rumoroso, Coquimbo |
| 19:00 | Vásquez 20'; Rodríguez 37' (pen.); Fajardo 76' | | Banini 2'; Larroquette 8'; Bravo 10'; Jaimes 41'; Bonsegundo 45' (pen.), 85' | Referee: María Victoria Daza (Colombia) |

| 13 April 2018 2018 Copa América First Stage | Argentina | 2-0 | Venezuela | Estadio Municipal Francisco Sánchez Rumoroso, Coquimbo |
| 16:45 | Jaimes 44' (pen.); Banini 61' (pen.) | | | Referee: Claudia Umpiérrez (Uruguay) |

| 16 April 2018 2018 Copa América Final Stage | Colombia | 1-3 | Argentina | Estadio La Portada, La Serena |
| 16:45 | Salazar 31' | | Bonsegundo 50'; Jaimes 66'; Coronel 70' | Referee: Emikar Calderas (Venezuela) |

| 19 April 2018 2018 Copa América Final Stage | Brazil | 3-0 | Argentina | Estadio La Portada, La Serena |
| 16:45 | Cristiane 47'; Thaisa 52'; Debinha 78' | | | Referee: Susana Corella (Ecuador) |

| 22 April 2018 2018 Copa América Final Stage | Chile | 4-0 | Argentina | Estadio La Portada, La Serena |
| 16:45 | Sáez 8'; Hernández 24'; Barroso 40' (o.g.); Lara 90+2' | | | Referee: Emikar Calderas (Venezuela) |

| 30 October 2018 Friendly | Puerto Rico | 0–3 | Argentina | Mayagüez, Puerto Rico |
| | | | Potassa 7' (pen.); Cometti 10', 88' (pen.) | Stadium: Mayagüez Athletics Stadium |

| 2 September 2018 Friendly | Puerto Rico | 1–1 | Argentina | Bayamón, Puerto Rico |
| | Torres 31' | | Cabrera 46' | Stadium: Juan Ramón Loubriel Stadium |

| 5 November 2018 CONCACAF–CONMEBOL play-off 1st Leg | Argentina | 4–0 | Panama | Avellaneda, Argentina |
| 19:00 UTC−3 | Larroquette 21'; Stabile 27', 90+8' (pen.); Rodriguez 90+5' | | | Stadium: Estadio Julio Humberto Grondona; Referee: Jana Adámková (Czech Republic) |

| 13 November 2018 CONCACAF–CONMEBOL play-off 2nd Leg | Panama | 1–1 | Argentina | Panama City, Panama |
| 20:00 UTC−5 | Mills 37' | | Bonsegundo 65' | Stadium: Estadio Rommel Fernández; Referee: Kateryna Monzul (Ukraine) |

| 28 February 2019 Cup of Nations | Argentina | 0–5 | South Korea | Sydney, Australia |
| 16:35 AEDT | | Source | Moon Mi-ra 4'; Son Hwa-yeon 53'; Lee So-dam 56'; Ji So-yun 68', 75' | Stadium: Leichhardt Oval |

| 3 March 2019 Cup of Nations | Argentina | 0–2 | New Zealand | Brisbane, Australia |
| 15:05 AEST | | Source | Rood 50'; Bott 70' | Stadium: Suncorp Stadium |

| 6 March 2019 Cup of Nations | Australia | 3–0 | Argentina | Melbourne, Australia |
| 18:00 AEDT | Kerr 4'; Kennedy 33'; Foord 90+4' (pen.) | Source | | Stadium: AAMI Park |

| 2 April 2019 Unofficial friendly | Utah Valley (United States) | 1–3 | Argentina | Utah, United States |
| 18:00 AEDT | Amber Tripp 5' | Report | Menéndez 12'; Larroquette 31'; Bravo 33' | Stadium: UVU Clyde Field |

| 4 April 2019 Unofficial friendly | BYU Cougars (United States) | 1–1 | Argentina | Utah, United States |
| 18:00 AEDT | Elise Flake 51' | Report | Larroquette 35' | Stadium: South Field |

| 6 April 2019 Unofficial friendly | UNLV Rebels (United States) | 1–0 | Argentina | Nevada, United States |
| 18:00 AEDT | Robin Pollard | Report | | Stadium: Peter Johann Soccer Field |

| 8 April 2019 Unofficial friendly | CSN Coyotes (United States) | 0–6 | Argentina | Nevada, United States |
| 18:00 AEDT | | Report | Potassa 40', 45', 80', 90'; Bravo 70'; Larroquette 71' | Stadium: Peter Johann Soccer Field |

| 23 May 2019 Friendly | Argentina | 3–1 | Uruguay | San Luis, Argentina |
| 18:00 AEDT | Bonsegundo 18'; Jaimes 36'; Potassa 75' (pen.) | Report | Stefany Suárez 86' | Stadium: La Pedrera Stadium |

| 10 June 2019 FIFA Women's World Cup – GS | Argentina | 0–0 | Japan | Paris, France |
| 18:00 UTC+2 | | Report | | Stadium: Parc des Princes; Attendance: 25,055; Referee: Stéphanie Frappart (France) |

| 14 June 2019 FIFA Women's World Cup – GS | England | 1–0 | Argentina | Le Havre, France |
| 21:00 UTC+2 | Taylor 62' | Report | | Stadium: Stade Océane; Attendance: 20,294; Referee: Qin Liang (China PR) |

| 19 June 2019 FIFA Women's World Cup – GS | Scotland | 3–3 | Argentina | Paris, France |
| 21:00 UTC+2 | Little 19'; Beattie 49'; Cuthbert 69' | Report | Menéndez 74'; Alexander 79' (o.g.); Bonsegundo 90+4' (pen.) | Stadium: Parc des Princes; Attendance: 28,205; Referee: Ri Hyang-ok (North Korea) |

| 28 July 2019 2019 Pan American Games | Argentina | 3–0 | Peru | Lima, Peru |
| 20:30 UTC−5 | Larroquette 6', 88'; Oviedo 9' | Report | | Stadium: Estadio Universidad San Marcos; Referee: Dione Rissios (Chile); Assistant referees: Cindy Nahuelcoy (Chile); Marcia Castillo (Chile); Fourth official: Adriana Farfán (Bolivia) |

| 31 July 2019 2019 Pan American Games | Panama | 0–1 | Argentina | Lima, Peru |
| 17:30 UTC−5 | | Report | Larroquette 66' | Stadium: Estadio Universidad San Marcos; Referee: Yercinia Correa (Venezuela); Assistant referees: Yoly García (Venezuela); Yoleida Lara (Venezuela); Fourth official: Elizabeth Tintaya (Peru) |

| 3 August 2019 2019 Pan American Games | Argentina | 0–0 | Costa Rica | Lima, Peru |
| 17:30 UTC−5 | | Report | | Stadium: Estadio Universidad San Marcos; Referee: Silvia Ríos (Uruguay); Assistant referees: Adela Sánchez (Uruguay); Daiana Fernández (Uruguay); Fourth official: Milagros Arruela (Peru) |

| 6 August 2019 2019 Pan American Games | Paraguay | 0–3 | Argentina | Lima, Peru |
| 17:30 UTC−5 | | Report | Larroquette 13'; Cometti 20'; Oviedo 34' | Stadium: Estadio Universidad San Marcos; Referee: Dione Rissios (Chile); Assistant referees: Marcia Castillo (Chile); Cindy Nahuelcoy (Chile); Fourth official: Yercinia Correa (Venezuela) |

| 9 August 2019 2019 Pan American Games | Argentina | 1–1 (a.e.t.) (6–7 p) | Colombia | Lima, Peru |
| 20:30 UTC−5 | Barroso 41' | | Usme 33' | Stadium: Estadio Universidad San Marcos |
| | Penalties |
| | Larroquette (penalty scored); Stábile (penalty scored); Santana (penalty scored); Cometti (penalty scored); Oviedo (penalty scored); Barroso (penalty scored); Chávez (penalty missed) | | (penalty scored) Usme; (penalty scored) Restrepo; (penalty scored) Gaitán; (penalty scored) Echeverri; (penalty scored) Santos; (penalty scored) Vanegas; (penalty scored) C. Arias |

| 29 August 2019 Torneio Internacional de Futebol Feminino | Brazil | 5-0 | Argentina | São Paulo, Brazil |
| 21:30 UTC−3 | Ludmila 18'; Formiga 34'; Debinha 36'; Érika 59'; Juncos 83' (o.g.) | | | Stadium: Pacaembu; Referee: Edina Batista (Brazil) |

| 1 September 2019 Torneio Internacional de Futebol Feminino | Costa Rica | 3-1 | Argentina | São Paulo, Brazil |
| 11:00 UTC−3 | Chinchilla 28', 49', Herrera 90+5' | | Jaimes 57' | Stadium: Pacaembu |

| 7 November 2019 Friendly | Paraguay | 1-2 | Argentina | Luque, Paraguay |
| 09:00 UTC−3 | Caceres 22' | | Hain 69', Larroquette 71' | Stadium: General Adrián Jara |

| 9 November 2019 Friendly | Argentina | 1–0 | Colombia | Ezeiza, Buenos Aires, Argentina |
| 15:10 UTC−3 | D.Arias 33' (o.g.) | | | Stadium: Predio Ezeiza; Referee: Laura Fortunato |

| 12 November 2019 Friendly | Argentina | 2–2 | Colombia | Ezeiza, Buenos Aires, Argentina |
| 14:30 UTC−3 | Menéndez 47', 90+3' | | S.Sepúlveda 26'; S.Martínez 50' | Stadium: Centro de Entrenamiento de Ezeiza; Referee: Roberta Echeverria |

=== 2020-present ===
| 18 February 2021 2021 SheBelieves Cup | Brazil | 4–1 | Argentina | Orlando, United States |
| 16:05 | Marta 30' (pen.); Debinha 47'; Adriana 54'; Geyse 84' | Report | Larroquette 60' | Stadium: Exploria Stadium; Attendance: 1,119; Referee: Katja Koroleva (United States) |

| 21 February 2021 2021 SheBelieves Cup | Argentina | 0–1 | Canada | Orlando, United States |
| 18:05 | | Report | Stratigakis 90+2' | Stadium: Exploria Stadium; Attendance: 1,348; Referee: Tori Penso (United States) |

| 24 February 2021 2021 SheBelieves Cup | United States | 6–0 | Argentina | Orlando |
| 19:05 | Rapinoe 16', 26'; Lloyd 35'; Mewis 41'; Morgan 84'; Press 88' | Report | | Stadium: Exploria Stadium; Attendance: 3,702; Referee: Marianela Araya Cruz (Costa Rica) |

| 8 April 2021 Friendly | Argentina | 0–0 | Venezuela | Lezama, Basque Country, Spain |
| | | | | Stadium: Lezama Facilities; Attendance: 0 |

| 17 September 2021 Friendly | Brazil | 3–1 | Argentina | João Pessoa, Paraíba, Brazil |
| 14:00 | Debinha 38'; Nycole 50'; Angelina 59' | Report | Bonsegundo 73' | Stadium: Almeidão; Referee: Deborah Cecilia Correia (Brazil) |

| 20 September 2021 Friendly | Brazil | 4–1 | Argentina | Campina Grande, Paraíba, Brazil |
| 14:00 | Kerolin 19'; Marta 37'; Debinha 48'; Yasmim 52' | Report | Larroquette 51' | Stadium: Amigão; Referee: Thayslane Costa (Brazil) |

| 23 October 2021 Friendly | Mexico | 6–1 | Argentina | Tepatitlán, Jalisco, Mexico |
| 16:00 ET | Mayor 42' (pen.), 43'; González 47', 67'; Sánchez 51'; Montoya 85' | | Bonsegundo 12' | Stadium: Estadio Gregorio "Tepa" Gómez |

| 27 November 2021 Friendly | Ecuador | 0–0 | Argentina | Quito, Ecuador |
| | | | | Stadium: Estadio Rodrigo Paz Delgado |

| 30 November 2021 Friendly | Ecuador | 2–2 | Argentina | Quito, Ecuador |
| | Flores 28', 32' | | Larroquette 5', 37' | Stadium: Estadio Rodrigo Paz Delgado |

| 20 February 2022 Friendly | Colombia | 2–2 | Argentina | Cali, Colombia |
| | Usme 47'; Ramírez 87' | | Bravo 32'; Singarella 88' | Stadium: Estadio Olímpico Pascual Guerrero |

| 23 February 2022 Friendly | Colombia | 0–0 | Argentina | Bucaramanga, Colombia |
| | | | | Stadium: Estadio Alfonso López |

| 7 April 2022 Friendly | Argentina | 0–1 | Chile | Córdoba, Argentina |
| | | | | Stadium: Estadio Mario Alberto Kempes |

| 10 April 2022 Friendly | Argentina | 1–0 | Chile | La Punta, Argentina |
| | | | | Stadium: Estadio Provincial Juan Gilberto Funes |

| 9 July 2022 Copa América GS | Brazil | 4–0 | Argentina | Armenia, Colombia |
| | Adriana 28', 58'; Bia Zaneratto 36' (pen.); Debinha 87' | Report (CONMEBOL) | | Stadium: Estadio Centenario |

| 12 July 2022 Copa América GS | Argentina | 4–0 | Peru | Armenia, Colombia |
| | | Report (CONMEBOL) | | Stadium: Estadio Centenario |

| 15 July 2022 Copa América GS | Argentina | 5–0 | Uruguay | Armenia, Colombia |
| | | Report (CONMEBOL) | | Stadium: Estadio Centenario |

| 21 July 2022 Copa América GS | Venezuela | 0–1 | Argentina | Armenia, Colombia |
| | | Report (CONMEBOL) | | Stadium: Estadio Centenario |

| 25 July 2022 Copa América SF | Colombia | 1–0 | Argentina | Bucaramanga, Colombia |
| 19:00 UTC–05:00 | | Report (CONMEBOL) | | Stadium: Estadio Alfonso López |

| 29 July 2022 Copa América 3rd | Argentina | 3–1 | Paraguay | Armenia, Colombia |
| 19:00 UTC–05:00 | | Report (CONMEBOL) | | Stadium: Estadio Centenario |

| 6 October 2022 Friendly | Canada | 2–0 | Argentina | Jerez, Spain |
| | Santana 68' (o.g.); Lacasse 87' | | | Stadium: Estadio Municipal de Chapín |

| 9 October 2022 Friendly | Argentina | 2–2 | Poland | Jerez, Spain |
| | | | | Stadium: Estadio Municipal de Chapín |

| 11 November 2022 Friendly | Spain | 7–0 | Argentina | Melilla, Spain |
| 20:00 | | | | Stadium: Álvarez Claro |

| 17 February 2023 Friendly | Argentina | 4–0 | Chile | Auckland, New Zealand |
| 19:30 NZDT (UTC+13) | Stábile 40'; Larroquette 49' (pen.); Rodríguez 71'; Bonsegundo 90+3' | Report | | Stadium: North Harbour Stadium; Attendance: 3,457; Referee: Anna-Marie Keighley (New Zealand) |

| 20 February 2023 Friendly | New Zealand | 0–2 | Argentina | Hamilton, New Zealand |
| 19:00 NZDT (UTC+13) | | Report | Larroquette 17'; Cometti 90' | Stadium: Waikato Stadium; Attendance: 3,622; Referee: Lara Lee (Australia) |

| 23 February 2023 Friendly | New Zealand | 0–1 | Argentina | Auckland, New Zealand |
| 19:00 NZDT (UTC+13) | | Report | Larroquette 77' | Stadium: North Harbour Stadium; Attendance: 3,914; Referee: Tatiana Guzmán (Nicaragua) |

| 6 April 2023 Copa Ciudad de Córdoba | Argentina | 1–1 (6–7 p) | Venezuela | Córdoba, Argentina |
| 20:00 ART (UTC−3) | Cometti 90+1' | Report | Speckmaier 38' | Stadium: Estadio Mario Alberto Kempes; Attendance: 31,800; Referee: Adriana Álvarez (Argentina) |
| | Penalties |
| | Cometti (penalty missed); Bonsegundo (penalty scored); Banini (penalty scored); Stábile (penalty scored); Braun (penalty scored); Núñez (penalty scored); Gramaglia (penalty scored); Troncoso (penalty missed) | | Villamizar (penalty scored); Viso (penalty missed); Speckmaier (penalty scored); Romero (penalty scored); Giménez (penalty scored); Peraza (penalty scored); Herrera (penalty scored); Rodríguez (penalty scored) |

| 9 April 2023 Friendly | Argentina | 3–0 | Venezuela | La Rioja, Argentina |
| 16:00 ART (UTC−3) | Braun 4'; Bonsegundo 56'; Banini 61' | Report | | Stadium: Estadio Carlos Augusto Mercado Luna; Attendance: 9,800; Referee: Laura Fortunato (Argentina) |

| 14 July 2023 Friendly | Argentina | 4–0 | Peru | San Nicolás de los Arroyos, Argentina |
| 20:30 ART (UTC−3) | Larroquette 17'; Banini 43'; Rodríguez 61'; Gómez Ares 90+6' | Report | | Stadium: Estadio Único de San Nicolás; Attendance: 23,000; Referee: Roberta Echeverría (Argentina) |

| 24 July 2023 FIFA WC Group | Italy | 1–0 | Argentina | Auckland, New Zealand |
| 18:00 NZST (UTC+12) | Girelli 87' | Report | | Stadium: Eden Park; Attendance: 30,889; Referee: Melissa Borjas (Honduras) |

| 28 July 2023 FIFA WC Group | Argentina | 2–2 | South Africa | Dunedin, New Zealand |
| 12:00 NZST (UTC+12) | Braun 74'; Núñez 79' | Report | Motlhalo 30'; Kgatlana 66' | Stadium: Forsyth Barr Stadium; Attendance: 8,834; Referee: Anna-Marie Keighley (New Zealand) |

| 2 August 2023 FIFA WC Group | Argentina | 0–2 | Sweden | Hamilton, New Zealand |
| 19:00 NZST (UTC+12) | | Report | Blomqvist 66'; Rubensson 90' (pen.) | Stadium: Waikato Stadium; Attendance: 17,907; Referee: Salima Mukansanga (Rwanda) |

| 23 September 2023 Friendly | Japan | 8–0 | Argentina | Kitakyushu, Japan |
| 12:00 JST (UTC+9) | Tanaka 2'; Hasegawa 10' (pen.), 39'; Takahashi 25'; Seike 61', 90+2'; Sugita 66'; Ueki 80' (pen.) | Report | | Stadium: Kitakyushu Stadium; Attendance: 7,265; Referee: Oh Hyeon-jeong (South Korea) |

| 26 September 2023 Unofficial friendly | Japan | 0–0 | Argentina | Kitakyushu, Japan |
| | | Report | | Stadium: Honjo Athletic Stadium; Attendance: 0 |
Note: Behind-closed-doors training match

| 22 October 2023 Pan American Games Group | Costa Rica | 0–0 | Argentina | Viña del Mar, Chile |
| 20:00 PET (UTC−3) | | Report | | Stadium: Estadio Sausalito; Referee: Priscila Vasquez (Peru) |

| 25 October 2023 Pan American Games Group | Bolivia | 0–3 | Argentina | Valparaíso, Chile |
| 18:00 PET (UTC−3) | | Report | Cometti 11'; Stábile 48' (pen.); Cruz 90+5' | Stadium: Estadio Elías Figueroa Brander; Referee: Gabriela Arce (Paraguay) |

| 28 October 2023 Pan American Games Group | United States U19 | 4–0 | Argentina | Valparaíso, Chile |
| 18:00 PET (UTC−3) | Bodak 15'; Kohler 20'; Villarreal 50'; Restovich 54' | Report | | Stadium: Estadio Elías Figueroa Brander; Referee: Andreza De Siqueira (Brazil) |

| 31 October 2023 Pan American Games Semi-finals | Mexico | 2–0 | Argentina | Valparaíso, Chile |
| 17:00 PET (UTC−3) | Ovalle 32', 89' | Report | | Stadium: Estadio Elías Figueroa Brander; Referee: Paula Fernández (Colombia) |

| 3 November 2023 Pan American Games Bronze medal match | Argentina | 0–2 | United States U19 | Valparaíso, Chile |
| 13:00 PET (UTC−3) | | Report | Villarreal 30'; Hutton 37' | Stadium: Estadio Elías Figueroa Brander; Referee: Stefani Escobar (Venezuela) |

| 20 February 2024 CONCACAF W Gold Cup GS | Mexico | 0–0 | Argentina | Carson, United States |
| 16:30 PST (UTC−8) | | Report | | Stadium: Dignity Health Sports Park; Attendance: 2,521; Referee: Myriam Marcotte (Canada) |

| 23 February 2024 CONCACAF W Gold Cup GS | Argentina | 0–4 | United States | Carson, United States |
| 19:15 PST (UTC−8) | | Report | Shaw 10', 18'; Morgan 19'; Horan 77' (pen.) | Stadium: Dignity Health Sports Park; Attendance: 8,315; Referee: Marie-Soleil Beaudoin (Canada) |

| 26 February 2024 CONCACAF W Gold Cup GS | Argentina | 3–0 | Dominican Republic | Carson, United States |
| 16:00 PST (UTC−8) | Ippólito 30'; Dos Santos 76'; Pereyra 90+4' | Report | | Stadium: Dignity Health Sports Park; Attendance: 4,100; Referee: Odette Hamilton (Jamaica) |

| 2 March 2024 CONCACAF W Gold Cup QF | Brazil | 5–1 | Argentina | Los Angeles, United States |
| 19:15 PST (UTC−8) | Vitória 19'; Yasmim 36'; Bia Zaneratto 54', 90+5'; Gabi Nunes 62' | Report | Dos Santos 82' | Stadium: BMO Stadium; Attendance: 2,824; Referee: Myriam Marcotte (Canada) |

| 31 May 2024 Friendly | Argentina | 2–0 | Costa Rica | Caseros, Argentina |
| 20:10 ART (UTC−3) | Bueno 19'; Palomar 86' | Report | | Stadium: Estadio Ciudad de Caseros; Referee: Roberta Echeverría (Argentina) |

| 3 June 2024 Friendly | Argentina | 2–0 | Costa Rica | Florida, Argentina |
| 20:10 ART (UTC−3) | Pereyra 64'; Rodríguez 69' | Report | | Stadium: Estadio Ciudad de Vicente López; Referee: Laura Fortunato (Argentina) |

| 10 July 2024 Friendly | Argentina | 0–2 | Uruguay | Caseros, Argentina |
| 17:00 ART (UTC−3) | | Report | Aquino 44'; Bonilla 45+2' | Stadium: Estadio Ciudad de Caseros; Referee: Gabriela Coronel (Argentina) |

| 13 July 2024 Friendly | Argentina | 1–1 | Uruguay | Ezeiza, Argentina |
| 11:00 ART (UTC−3) | Pereyra 54' | Report | Aquino 68' | Stadium: Predio Lionel Andrés Messi; Referee: Antonella Álvarez (Argentina) |

| 30 October 2024 Friendly | United States | 3–0 | Argentina | Louisville, United States |
| 19:00 EDT (UTC−4) | Girma 37', 49'; Cometti 44' (o.g.) | Report | | Stadium: Lynn Family Stadium; Attendance: 13,543; Referee: Karen Hernández (Mexico) |

| 30 November 2024 Friendly | Argentina | 1–1 (5–4 p) | Colombia | Davie, United States |
| 19:00 EST (UTC−5) | Núñez 16' | Report | Usme 47' | Stadium: Beyond Bancard Field; Referee: Alexandra Billeter (United States) |
| | Penalties |
| | Roggerone (penalty scored); Cometti (penalty scored); Rodríguez (penalty scored); Braun (penalty scored); Gómez (penalty missed); Troncoso (penalty scored) | | Usme (penalty scored); Vanegas (penalty scored); Santos (penalty missed); Reyes (penalty scored); Robledo (penalty scored); Barón (penalty missed) |

| 22 February 2025 Friendly | Chile | 0–3 | Argentina | La Florida, Chile |
| 19:00 CLST (UTC−3) | | Report | M. Pereyra 21'; Rodríguez 54'; Holzheier 66' | Stadium: Estadio Bicentenario de La Florida; Referee: Daiane Muniz (Brazil) |

| 25 February 2025 Friendly | Chile | 0–0 | Argentina | Macul, Chile |
| 10:30 CLST (UTC−3) | | Report | | Stadium: Complejo Deportivo Juan Pinto Durán; Referee: Charly Deretti (Brazil) |

| 4 April 2025 Friendly | Canada | 3–0 | Argentina | Vancouver, Canada |
| 19:30 PDT (UTC−7) | J. Rose 24'; Prince 39'; Grosso 87' | Report | | Stadium: BC Place; Referee: Natalie Simon (United States) |

| 8 April 2025 Friendly | Canada | 0–1 | Argentina | Langford, Canada |
| 19:00 PDT (UTC−7) | | Report | Rodríguez 34' | Stadium: Starlight Stadium; Referee: Ekaterina Koroleva (United States) |

| 30 May 2025 Friendly | Australia | 2–0 | Argentina | Melbourne, Australia |
| 20:00 AEST (UTC+10) | Johnson 38'; Torpey 69' | Report | | Stadium: Marvel Stadium; Attendance: 43,020; Referee: Pansa Chaisanit (Thailand) |

| 2 June 2025 Friendly | Australia | 4–1 | Argentina | Canberra, Australia |
| 19:30 AEST (UTC+10) | Sayer 14', 36'; van Egmond 72'; Heyman 83' | Report | K. Núñez 23' | Stadium: GIO Stadium; Attendance: 25,125; Referee: Supiree Testhomya (Thailand) |

| 15 July 2025 Copa América GS | Uruguay | 0–1 | Argentina | Quito, Ecuador |
| 16:00 ECT (UTC−5) | | Report | Bonsegundo 76' | Stadium: Estadio Banco Guayaquil; Referee: Zulma Quiñónez (Paraguay) |

| 18 July 2025 Copa América GS | Argentina | 2–1 | Chile | Quito, Ecuador |
| 19:00 ECT (UTC−5) | Falfán 75'; Cometti 90' | Report | Pardo 11' | Stadium: Estadio Banco Guayaquil; Referee: María Victoria Daza (Colombia) |

| 21 July 2025 Copa América GS | Argentina | 1–0 | Peru | Quito, Ecuador |
| 16:00 ECT (UTC−5) | Rodríguez 88' | Report | | Stadium: Estadio Banco Guayaquil; Referee: Daiane Muniz (Brazil) |

| 24 July 2025 Copa América GS | Ecuador | 0–2 | Argentina | Quito, Ecuador |
| 19:00 ECT (UTC−5) | | Report | Núñez 19'; Bonsegundo 70' | Stadium: Estadio Banco Guayaquil; Referee: Adriana Farfán (Bolivia) |

| 28 July 2025 Copa América SF | Argentina | 0–0 (4–5 p) | Colombia | Quito, Ecuador |
| 19:00 ECT (UTC−5) | | Report | | Stadium: Estadio Rodrigo Paz Delgado; Referee: Ivana Projkovska (North Macedonia) |
| | Penalties |
| | Bonsegundo (penalty scored); Braun (penalty scored); Gramaglia (penalty missed); Cometti (penalty scored); Núñez (penalty scored); Stábile (penalty missed) | | Usme (penalty scored); Carabalí (penalty scored); Paví (penalty scored); Ramírez (penalty missed); Caicedo (penalty scored); Bonilla (penalty scored) |

| 1 August 2025 Copa América 3rd place | Argentina | 2–2 (5–4 p) | Uruguay | Quito, Ecuador |
| 19:00 ECT (UTC−5) | Cometti 24'; Bonsegundo 83' (pen.) | Report | Pizarro 35'; Viera 45' | Stadium: Estadio Rodrigo Paz Delgado; Referee: Emikar Calderas (Venezuela) |
| | Penalties |
| | Bonsegundo (penalty scored); Braun (penalty scored); Roggerone (penalty scored); Cometti (penalty scored); Núñez (penalty scored) | | Pa. González (penalty scored); Lacoste (penalty missed); Ramírez (penalty scored); Olivera (penalty scored); Pizarro (penalty scored) |

| 24 October Liga de Naciones | Argentina | 3–1 | Paraguay | Buenos Aires, Argentina |
| 20:00 ART (UTC−3) | Cometti 17'; Holzheier 22'; Pereyra 45+4' | Report | Barreto 45+2' | Stadium: Estadio Diego Armando Maradona; Referee: Edina Alves (Brazil) |

| 28 October Liga de Naciones | Uruguay | 2–2 | Argentina | Montevideo, Uruguay |
| 18:00 UYT (UTC−3) | Lacoste 34'; Aquino 72' | Report | M. Pereyra 48'; Paz 89' | Stadium: Estadio Centenario; Referee: Emikar Calderas (Venezuela) |

| 2 December Liga de Naciones | Argentina | 8–0 | Bolivia | Banfield, Argentina |
| 20:00 UTC−3 | Gramaglia 7', 51'; Cometti 31'; Bonsegundo 43' (pen.), 90+4'; Núñez 60', 89'; Altgelt 73' | Report (FIFA) | | Stadium: Estadio Florencio Sola; Referee: Nadia Fuques (Uruguay) |

| 10 April 2026 Liga de Naciones | Chile | 0–1 | Argentina | Valparaíso, Chile |
| 20:00 UTC−4 | | Report | Bonsegundo 42' (pen.) | Stadium: Estadio Elías Figueroa Brander; Referee: Charly Deretti (Brazil) |

| 14 April 2026 Liga de Naciones | Venezuela | 1–2 | Argentina | Cabudare, Venezuela |
| 19:00 UTC−4 | Olivieri 86' | Report | Holzheier 7'; Bonsegundo 57' | Stadium: Estadio Metropolitano de Cabudare; Referee: Brenda Cisternas (Chile) |

| 18 April 2026 Liga de Naciones | Argentina | 0–0 | Colombia | Lanús, Argentina |
| 20:00 UTC−3 | | Report | | Stadium: Estadio Ciudad de Lanús; Referee: Emikar Calderas (Venezuela) |

| 5 June 2026 Liga de Naciones | Argentina | v | Peru | Florida, Argentina |
| 20:00 UTC−3 | | | | Stadium: Estadio Ciudad de Vicente López |

| 9 June 2026 Liga de Naciones | Ecuador | v | Argentina | Quito, Ecuador |
| 18:00 UTC−5 | | | | Stadium: Estadio Olímpico Atahualpa |

== Head-to-head ==
The following table shows Argentina's all-time international record, from December 3, 1993.

As of 1 August 2025

| Rival | First | Last | Pld | W | D | L | GF | GA | GD | Win % |
|---|---|---|---|---|---|---|---|---|---|---|
| Australia | 1995 | 2025 | 4 | 0 | 1 | 0 | 1 | 16 | -15 | 0% |
| Bolivia | 1995 | 2023 | 7 | 7 | 0 | 1 | 40 | 0 | +40 | 100% |
| Brazil | 1995 | 2024 | 21 | 2 | 1 | 18 | 14 | 73 | -59 | 11.9% |
| Canada | 2003 | 2025 | 8 | 1 | 0 | 7 | 2 | 17 | -15 | 12.5% |
| Chile | 1993 | 2025 | 22 | 11 | 5 | 6 | 41 | 23 | +18 | 61.36% |
| China | 2007 | 2014 | 5 | 1 | 1 | 3 | 1 | 9 | -8 | 30% |
| Colombia | 2003 | 2025 | 15 | 4 | 8 | 3 | 19 | 13 | +6 | 53.33% |
| Denmark | 2010 | | 1 | 0 | 0 | 1 | 0 | 1 | -1 | 0% |
| Dominican Republic | 2024 | | 1 | 1 | 0 | 0 | 3 | 0 | +3 | 100% |
| Ecuador | 1995 | 2025 | 10 | 6 | 2 | 2 | 27 | 10 | +17 | 70% |
| El Salvador | 2000 | | 1 | 1 | 0 | 0 | 6 | 0 | +6 | 100% |
| England | 2007 | 2019 | 2 | 0 | 0 | 2 | 1 | 7 | -6 | 0% |
| Germany | 2003 | 2007 | 2 | 0 | 0 | 2 | 1 | 17 | -16 | 0% |
| Guatemala | 2000 | | 1 | 1 | 0 | 0 | 5 | 0 | +5 | 100% |
| Italy | 2023 | | 1 | 0 | 0 | 1 | 0 | 1 | -1 | 0% |
| Japan | 2003 | 2023 | 6 | 0 | 1 | 5 | 0 | 20 | -20 | 8.33% |
| South Korea | 2003 | 2019 | 3 | 0 | 0 | 3 | 1 | 9 | -8 | 0% |
| Mexico | 1998 | 2024 | 11 | 1 | 2 | 8 | 12 | 29 | -17 | 18.18% |
| Nicaragua | 2000 | | 1 | 1 | 0 | 0 | 9 | 0 | +9 | 100% |
| New Zealand | 2000 | 2023 | 8 | 3 | 1 | 4 | 6 | 8 | -2 | 43.75% |
| Panama | 2007 | 2019 | 4 | 3 | 1 | 0 | 8 | 1 | +7 | 87.5% |
| Paraguay | 1998 | 2022 | 10 | 9 | 1 | 0 | 27 | 5 | +22 | 95% |
| Peru | 1998 | 2025 | 12 | 9 | 2 | 1 | 27 | 8 | +19 | 83.33% |
| Poland | 2022 | | 1 | 0 | 1 | 0 | 2 | 2 | 0 | 50% |
| Puerto Rico | 2018 | 2018 | 2 | 1 | 1 | 0 | 4 | 1 | +3 | 75% |
| Scotland | 2019 | | 1 | 0 | 1 | 0 | 3 | 3 | 0 | 50% |
| South Africa | 2023 | | 1 | 0 | 1 | 0 | 2 | 2 | 0 | 50% |
| Spain | 2022 | | 1 | 0 | 0 | 1 | 0 | 7 | -7 | 0% |
| Sweden | 2008 | 2023 | 2 | 0 | 0 | 2 | 0 | 3 | -3 | 0% |
| Trinidad & Tobago | 2007 | 2015 | 2 | 1 | 1 | 0 | 4 | 2 | +2 | 75% |
| United States | 1998 | 2024 | 9 | 0 | 0 | 9 | 1 | 44 | -43 | 0% |
| Uruguay | 1997 | 2025 | 21 | 17 | 2 | 2 | 61 | 12 | +49 | 85.71% |
| Venezuela | 2018 | 2023 | 6 | 4 | 2 | 0 | 8 | 1 | +7 | 83.33% |
