= Paola Bermúdez =

Ecuadorian footballer (born 1971)

Personal information
- Full name: Paola Jessica Bermúdez Caicedo
- Date of birth: 11 September 1971 (age 55)
- Position: Midfielder

Senior career*
Years	Team	Apps	(Gls)
- Guayas selection

International career^{‡}
2003–2006	Ecuador	6	(0)
- * Club domestic league appearances and goals ‡ National team caps and goals as of 18 November 2006.

Paola Jessica Bermúdez Caicedo (born 11 September 1971) is an Ecuadorian former footballer who played as a midfielder. She has been a member of the Ecuador women's national team.

== Club career ==
Bermúdez has played for the Guayas selection in Ecuador.

== International career ==
Bermúdez capped for Ecuador at senior level during two Copa América Femenina editions (2003 and 2006). She also integrated the squad that competed at the 2007 Pan American Games.
