= Olienka Salinas =

Peruvian football and futsal player and manager

Personal information
- Full name: Gloria Olienka Giovanna Salinas López
- Date of birth: 16 November 1973 (age 52)
- Place of birth: Chimbote, Peru
- Positions: Forward; midfielder

Team information
- Current team: Sporting Cristal (technical staff)

Youth career
- 1981–1996: Unknown

Senior career*
Years	Team	Apps	(Gls)
1997–2000	Sporting Cristal		
2000–2005	Sport Boys		(18)
2004–2009	USMP (futsal)		

International career
1998–2003	Peru women's team	11	(7)
2004–2009	Peru women's futsal team	9	(9)
Medal record
Women's football
Representing Peru
South American Women's Football Championship
Third place	1998 Mar del Plata
- * Club domestic league appearances and goals

Gloria Olienka Giovanna Salinas López (born 16 November 1973), known as Olienka Salinas, is a Peruvian former football and futsal player and current manager. She is the Peruvian football and futsal team all-time-top-scorer with 7 and 9 goals respectively. Since 2018 she has been part of the technical staff of the Sporting Cristal women's football team that participates in the Peruvian women's football championship.

== Early life and club career ==
Olienka started playing soccer when she was 5 years-old in her hometown, Chimbote. In January 1997 she traveled to Lima to do tests at Sporting Cristal and eventually was selected. She played for Sporting Cristal until 2000 and during this period she won the National Championship three times (1998, 1999, 2000). Also she won and was the top scorer of the 2000 Sudamerican club women's football championship, an «experimental» tournament was organized by Peruvian Football Federation and can be considered as a precedent for the Copa Libertadores Femenina (Female Copa Libertadores).

The Sporting Cristal women's football team disappeared and Olienka continued her career in Sport Boys where she became top scorer of the 2002 National Championship. Olienka retired from football in 2005.

Since 2004 until 2009, Olienka played for Universidad San Martín female futsal team and competed in the Peruvian Metropolitan Women's Championship. She won the 2006 championship and was the top scorer in both 2006 and 2007.

Club	Country	Years
Sporting Cristal (football)	Peru	1997-2000
Sport Boys (football)	Peru	2000-05
USMP (futsal)	Peru	2004-09

== International career ==
Olienka was part of the Peru women's national football team that played the 1998 South American Women's Football Championship and finished third, currently its best performance. Olienka scored 5 goals that time and 2 more in the 2003 South American Women's Football Championship.

Olianka also played for the Perú women's national futsal team. She scored 7 goals in the 2005 South American Women's Futsal Championship, 2 goals in the 2007 South American Women's Futsal Championship, and participated in the 2009 South American Women's Futsal Championship where she didn't score.

=== Participations in the South American Women's Football Championship ===
Olienka has participated in two South American Women's Football Championship.

Tournament	Host city, country	Result	Played	goals
1998 South American Women's Football Championship	Mar del Plata, Argentina	Third Place	6	5
2003 South American Women's Football Championship	Lima, Perú	Fourth place	5	2

==== Goals in the South American Women's Football Championship ====
Tournament	Round	team 1	Result	team 2	Goals	Ref.
1998 South American Women's Football Championship	Group stage: Group A, matchday 3	Colombia	1–2	(Peru) Perú	1	
1998 South American Women's Football Championship	Semifinals	Argentina	1–1 (pen: 4-3)	(Peru) Perú	1	
1998 South American Women's Football Championship	Third place match	Perú (Peru)	3–3 (pen: 5-4)	Ecuador	3	
2003 South American Women's Football Championship	Group stage: Group A, matchday 1	Perú (Peru)	3–1	Bolivia	2	

=== Participations in the South American Women's Futsal Championship ===
Olienka has participated in two South American Women's Futsal Championship.

Tournament	Host city, country	Result	Played	goals
2005 South American Women's Futsal Championship	Barueri, Brazil	Group stage	3	7
2007 South American Women's Futsal Championship	Guayaquil, Ecuador	Group stage	3	2
2009 South American Women's Futsal Championship	Campinas, Brazil	Fourth place	3	0

== Managerial career ==
Olienka founded the Olienka Salinas Women's Football School and started managing. Later, she took over Fuerza Cristal, a female football club that played Peruvian women's football championship but without Sporting Cristal support. In 2018, Cristal refounded its women's football section based in the Fuerza Cristal team and Olienka became a member of the technical staff.

Since 2017, Olienka is part of the Peru women's national football team technical staff in all of its categories: absolute, U-20, U-17, U-15, futsal, etc.

Olienka is also the manager of the Franklin Delano Roosevelt School female football team and manager of the men and women Universidad Ricardo Palma futsal team.

== Honours and achievements ==
=== Player ===
==== National championships ====
Championship	Country	Club	Year
Peruvian women's football championship	Peru	Sporting Cristal (football)	1998
Peruvian women's football championship	Peru	Sporting Cristal (football)	1999
Peruvian women's football championship	Peru	Sporting Cristal (football)	2000
Peruvian Metropolitan Women's Championship	Peru	USMP (futsal)	2006

==== International championships ====
Championship	Club	Played	Goals
2000 Sudamerican club women's football championship	Sporting Cristal (football)	6	12

=== Manager ===
==== National championships ====
Championship	Country	Club	Year
Peruvian Metropolitan Women's Championship (opening)	Peru	Universidad Ricardo Palma	2010

== Personal life ==
Olienka is a Systems engineer graduated from Universidad de San Martín de Porres and also studied Physical Education at the National University of San Marcos. She also has studies in Sports Management and owns the Olienka Salinas Women's Football School.

== See also ==
- JC Sport Girls
