= Deysi Grández =

Peruvian footballer (born 1985)

Personal information
- Full name: Deysi Grández Santillán
- Date of birth: 9 November 1985 (age 40)
- Position: Forward

International career^{‡}
Years	Team	Apps	(Gls)
2003	Peru	3	(0)
- ‡ National team caps and goals as of 27 April 2003

Deysi Grández Santillán (born 9 November 1985) is a Peruvian former footballer who played as a forward. She has been a member of the Peru women's national team.

== International career ==
Grández capped for Peru at senior level during the 2003 South American Women's Football Championship.
