= Luz Román =

Peruvian footballer (born 1969)

Personal information
- Full name: Luz María Román García
- Date of birth: 22 August 1969 (age 57)
- Position: Midfielder

International career^{‡}
Years	Team	Apps	(Gls)
2003	Peru	4	(0)
- ‡ National team caps and goals as of 27 April 2003

Luz María Román García (born 22 August 1969) is a Peruvian former footballer who played as a midfielder. She has been a member of the Peru women's national team.

== International career ==
Román capped for Peru at senior level during the 2003 South American Women's Football Championship.
