= Adriana Dávila =

Peruvian footballer (born 1979)

Personal information
- Full name: Adriana Dávila Soracco
- Date of birth: 20 January 1979 (age 47)
- Position: Midfielder

International career^{‡}
| Years | Team | Apps | (Gls) |
| 1998–2010 | Peru | ? | (1) |
- ‡ National team caps and goals as of 19 November 2006

Adriana Dávila Soracco (born 20 January 1979) is a Peruvian former footballer who played as a midfielder. She has been a member of the Peru women's national team.

== International career ==
Dávila capped for Peru at senior level during four Copa América Femenina editions (1998, 2003, 2006 and 2010).

=== International goals ===
Scores and results list Peru's goal tally first

| No. | Date | Venue | Opponent | Score | Result | Competition | Ref. |
|---|---|---|---|---|---|---|---|
| 1 | 27 April 2003 | Estadio Monumental "U", Lima, Peru | Argentina | 1–0 | 1–1 | 2003 South American Women's Football Championship | |
