= Deanelly Derenzín =

Peruvian footballer (born 1974)

Personal information
- Full name: Primitiva Deanelli Derenzín Alvarado
- Date of birth: 20 April 1974 (age 52)
- Position: Centre back

International career^{‡}
| Years | Team | Apps | (Gls) |
| 2003 | Peru | 5 | (0) |
- ‡ National team caps and goals as of 27 April 2003

Primitiva Deanelli Derenzín Alvarado (born 20 April 1974), known as Deanelly Derenzín, is a Peruvian former footballer who played as a centre back. She has been a member of the Peru women's national team.

== International career ==
Derenzín capped for Peru at senior level during the 2003 South American Women's Football Championship.
