= Lorena Bosmans =

Peruvian football player and manager (born 1984)

Personal information
- Full name: Lorena Julia Bertha Bosmans Pastrana
- Date of birth: 10 February 1984 (age 42)
- Position: Left back

International career^{‡}
Years	Team	Apps	(Gls)
1998–2003	Peru	?	(1)

Managerial career
- 2006: Peru Women
- ‡ National team caps and goals as of 27 April 2003

Lorena Julia Bertha Bosmans Pastrana (born 10 February 1984) is a Peruvian football former player and manager. She played as a left back. She has been a member of the Peru women's national team as both player and head coach.

== International career ==
Bosmans capped for Peru at senior level during two Copa América Femenina editions (1998 and 2003).

=== International goals ===
Scores and results list Peru's goal tally first

No.	Date	Venue	Opponent	Score	Result	Competition	Ref.
1	13 April 2003	Estadio Monumental "U", Lima, Peru	Chile	1–1	2–1	2003 South American Women's Football Championship	

== Managerial career ==
Bosmans managed the Peru women's national football team at the 2006 South American Championship.
