= Patricia Pincay =

Ecuadorian footballer (born 1978)

Personal information
- Full name: Patricia Elizabeth Pincay Gorozabel
- Date of birth: 24 December 1978 (age 47)
- Place of birth: Jipijapa, Manabí, Ecuador
- Position: Goalkeeper

International career^{‡}
Years	Team	Apps	(Gls)
2003–2006	Ecuador	6	(0)
- ‡ National team caps and goals as of 10 November 2006

Patricia Elizabeth Pincay Gorozabel (born 24 December 1978) is an Ecuadorian former footballer who played as a goalkeeper. She has been a member of the Ecuador women's national team.

== International career ==
Pincay capped for Ecuador at senior level during two Copa América Femenina editions (2003 and 2006).
