= Cristina Sigcho =

Ecuadorian footballer (born 1980)

Personal information
- Full name: Cristina Antonieta Sigcho Junco
- Date of birth: 27 July 1980 (age 46)

Senior career*
Years	Team	Apps	(Gls)
- Guayas selection

International career^{‡}
2006	Ecuador	2	(0)
- * Club domestic league appearances and goals ‡ National team caps and goals as of 14 November 2006

Cristina Antonieta Sigcho Junco (born 27 July 1980) is an Ecuadorian former footballer. She has been a member of the Ecuador women's national team.

== Club career ==
Sigcho has played for the Guayas selection in Ecuador.

== International career ==
Sigcho capped for Ecuador at senior level during the 2006 South American Women's Football Championship.
