= Wendy Villón =

Ecuadorian footballer and manager (born 1978)

Personal information
- Full name: Wendy Marina Villón Mercado
- Date of birth: 9 May 1978 (age 48)
- Place of birth: Guayaquil, Ecuador
- Position: Midfielder

Senior career*
Years	Team	Apps	(Gls)
2003–2006	Todas Estrellas		
2006	Guayas selection		
2007–2010	Todas Estrellas		
2010	Guayas selection		
2011–2013	Todas Estrellas		

International career^{‡}
2003–2006	Ecuador	5	(2)

Managerial career
- 2018: Ecuador (women)
- 2019: Deportivo Cuenca (women)
- 2020–: El Nacional (women)
- * Club domestic league appearances and goals ‡ National team caps and goals as of 18 November 2006

Wendy Marina Villón Mercado (born 9 May 1978) is an Ecuadorian football manager and former player, who played as a midfielder. She has been a member of the Ecuador women's national team as both a player and a coach.

== International career ==
Villón played for Ecuador at senior level in two South American Women's Football Championship editions (2003 and 2006).

=== International goals ===
Scores and results list Ecuador's goal tally first

No.	Date	Venue	Opponent	Score	Result	Competition
1	9 April 2003	Estadio Federativo Reina del Cisne, Loja, Ecuador	Venezuela	1–0	2–0	2003 South American Women's Football Championship
2	9 April 2003	Estadio Federativo Reina del Cisne, Loja, Ecuador	Venezuela	2–0	2–0	2003 South American Women's Football Championship

== Managerial career ==
Villón managed Ecuador at the 2018 Copa América Femenina and Deportivo Cuenca at the 2019 Copa Libertadores Femenina.
