= Martha Mori =

Peruvian footballer (born 1979)

Personal information
- Full name: Martha Jesús Mori Jipa
- Date of birth: 1 June 1979 (age 47)
- Position: Forward

International career^{‡}
Years	Team	Apps	(Gls)
2003	Peru	4	(1)
- ‡ National team caps and goals as of 27 April 2003

Martha Jesús Mori Jipa (born 1 June 1979) is a Peruvian former footballer who played as a forward. She has been a member of the Peru women's national team.

== International career ==
Mori capped for Peru at senior level during the 2003 South American Women's Football Championship.

=== International goals ===
Scores and results list Peru's goal tally first

No.	Date	Venue	Opponent	Score	Result	Competition	Ref.
1	9 April 2003	Estadio Monumental "U", Lima, Peru	Bolivia	2–1	3–1	2003 South American Women's Football Championship	
