= Shirley Pérez =

Bolivian footballer (born 1979)

Personal information
- Full name: Shirley Pérez Figueroa
- Date of birth: 16 July 1979 (age 47)
- Height: 1.56 m (5 ft 1 in)
- Position: Forward

Senior career*
Years	Team	Apps	(Gls)
- Aurora

International career^{‡}
2003–2010	Bolivia	2	(1)
- * Club domestic league appearances and goals ‡ National team caps and goals as of 11 April 2003

Shirley Pérez Figueroa (born 16 July 1979) is a Bolivian retired footballer who played as a forward. She has been a member of the Bolivia women's national team.

== International career ==
Pérez played for Bolivia at senior level in three Copa América Femenina editions (2003, 2010 and 2014).

=== International goals ===
Scores and results list Bolivia's goal tally first

No.	Date	Venue	Opponent	Score	Result	Competition
1	11 April 2003	Estadio Monumental "U", Lima, Peru	Chile	6–0	7–1	2003 South American Women's Football Championship
