= Gretel Campi =

Cuban footballer (born 1984)

Personal information
- Full name: Gretel Sara Campi Pérez
- Date of birth: 20 January 1984 (age 42)
- Place of birth: Havana, Cuba
- Position: Midfielder

Senior career*
| Years | Team | Apps | (Gls) |
| 2002–2006 | La Troncal | | |
| 2006 | Guayas selection | | |
| 2007–2010 | La Troncal | | |
| 2010 | Guayas selection | | |
| 2011–201? | La Troncal | | |

International career^{‡}
| 2003–2006 | Ecuador | 6 | (1) |
- * Club domestic league appearances and goals ‡ National team caps and goals as of 18 November 2006

Gretel Sara Campi Pérez (born 20 January 1984) is a biologist and a retired footballer who played as a midfielder.

Born in Cuba, she moved to Ecuador and has been a member of the Ecuador women's national team.

== International career ==
Campi played for Ecuador at senior level in two South American Women's Football Championship editions (2003 and 2006).

=== International goals ===
Scores and results list Ecuador's goal tally first

| No. | Date | Venue | Opponent | Score | Result | Competition |
|---|---|---|---|---|---|---|
| 1 | 13 April 2003 | Estadio Federativo Reina del Cisne, Loja, Ecuador | Colombia | 1–0 | 1–1 | 2003 South American Women's Football Championship |
