= Pincay =

Pincay is a surname. Notable people with the surname include:

- Laffit Pincay Jr. (born 1946), American jockey
- Patricia Pincay (born 1978), Ecuadorian footballer
