= Ada Cruz =

Chilean footballer (born 1963)

Personal information
- Full name: Ada del Carmen Cruz Chavarría
- Date of birth: 25 November 1963 (age 62)
- Place of birth: Santiago, Chile
- Position: Forward

Senior career*
Years	Team	Apps	(Gls)
- Everton
- Santiago Morning

International career
1991–2004	Chile		
- * Club domestic league appearances and goals

Ada del Carmen Cruz Chavarría (born 25 November 1963) is a Chilean football coach and former player who played as a forward. She is known as the first women's football star in her country.

== Club career ==
Cruz began to play football alongside her brothers in Conchalí commune, Santiago. At club level, she began her career with the women's team of Everton de Viña del Mar based in Santiago. In total, she scored 125 goals for them.

Later, she played for clubs in Iquique and Santiago Morning.

== International career ==
Cruz was part of the Chile national team since it was made up in February 1991 under Bernardo Bello until 2004 under Sergio Rojas. She took part in the inaugural edition of the Copa América in 1991, then called South American Championship, scoring the first goal in the history of Chile in the 6–1 loss against Brazil. Chile became the runner-up and Cruz was chosen the best player of the tournament.

Later, she took part in tournaments such as 1994 Jayalalitha Cup and the 1995 South American Championship, among others.

== Coaching career ==
She became a football coach and has worked for the football academy of Hipódromo Chile and INAF (National Football Institute), the trade union of professional footballers in Chile.

== Political career ==
As a member of Independent Regionalist Party, Cruz was a candidate to the Regional Council for the district Santiago 1 in 2013.

As a member of National Renewal, she was a candidate to Councillor for Conchalí commune in the 2021 municipal elections.

== Personal life ==
She got pregnant at the age of 19 in Iquique and continued playing football until her seventh month of pregnancy.

On 23 April 2021, she suffered a serious car accident.
