= Gaby Malave =

Ecuadorian footballer (born 2001)

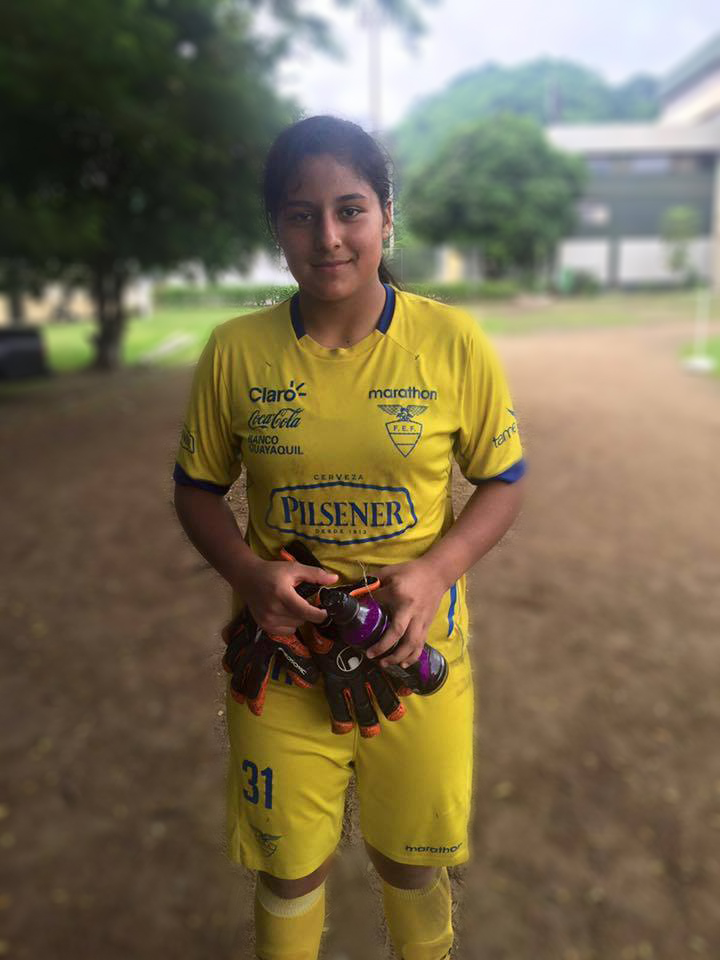
- Malave in 2016

Personal information
- Full name: Gabriela Monserrath Malave Vaca
- Date of birth: 8 March 2001 (age 25)
- Place of birth: Salcedo, Ecuador
- Height: 1.72 m (5 ft 8 in)
- Position: Goalkeeper

Senior career*
Years	Team	Apps	(Gls)
2020	Ñañas	4	(0)

International career^{‡}
2020	Ecuador U20	3	(0)
- * Club domestic league appearances and goals as of 3 October 2020 ‡ National team caps and goals as of 13 March 2020

Gabriela Monserrath Malave Vaca (born 8 March 2001) is an Ecuadorian footballer who plays as a goalkeeper for USFQ Dragonas Fútbol Club of the San Francisco Quito University and the Ecuador national team.

== Club career ==
As a young athlete, Malave was a futsal team goalkeeper in her hometown of Salcedo Canton, before switching to soccer.

She started playing at the ESPE soccer school in the U-8 category, where she played for four years with her parish's junior club. She also played in various community clubs in Salcedo.

== Higher level play ==
Malave became the national runner-up in the Community Sports Games in Sucumbíos Province playing for the champion team from Salcedo Canton, Cotopaxi Province. While vacationing in the United States, she participated in a tournament sponsored by Univision.

She later attended El Nacional school, playing for the Leo José club before moving on to the Salcedo Cantonal League and Club Huracán. She then joined the Universidad San Francisco de Quito.

She was invited to join the Pujilí Canton Municipal Gobierno Autónomo Descentralizado Duran (GADD) team to compete in a championship organized by the Universidad San Francisco de Quito, where coaches Ernesto Wladimir López Paredes and Ana Carolina Lara selected her to be part of the university team.

Malave was also invite to join the Under-20 national pre-selection process and to compete in the Pan American Games in São Paulo as part of the Ecuadorian women's national soccer team. At just 14 years old, she was called up by Under-17 coach Vanessa Arauz to participate in the South American Women's Soccer Championship and joined the Ecuadorian national team as a goalkeeper.
