= Karen Flores =

Ecuadorian footballer (born 2001)

Personal information
- Full name: Karen Valeria Flores Estrella
- Date of birth: 24 July 2001 (age 25)
- Height: 1.65 m (5 ft 5 in)
- Position: Forward

Team information
- Current team: Atlas
- Number: 7

College career
Years	Team	Apps	(Gls)
2020–2024	Cal State Bakersfield Roadrunners		

Senior career*
Years	Team	Apps	(Gls)
2025–	Atlas	33	(3)

International career^{‡}
2020	Ecuador U20	4	(0)
2020–	Ecuador	2	(2)
- * Club domestic league appearances and goals as of 6 February 2026 ‡ National team caps and goals as of 1 December 2020.

Karen Valeria Flores Estrella (born 24 July 2001) is an Ecuadorian footballer who plays as a forward for Liga MX Femenil club Atlas and the Ecuador women's national team.

== Early life ==
Flores was raised in Pichincha.

== College career ==
Flores has attended the California State University, Bakersfield in the United States.

== International career ==
Flores made her senior debut for Ecuador on 27 October 2020.

== International goals ==
Scores and results list Ecuador's goal tally first.

No.	Date	Venue	Opponent	Score	Result	Competition
1.	8 April 2024	Belek Football Training Camp, Belek, Turkey	Russia	1–0	2–3	Friendly
2.	24 October 2025	Estadio Municipal de El Alto, El Alto, Bolivia	Bolivia	4–0	4–0	2025–26 CONMEBOL Liga de Naciones Femenina
