= Elizabeth Villanueva =

Argentine footballer

Personal information
- Full name: María Elizabeth Villanueva
- Date of birth: 29 October 1974 (age 52)
- Place of birth: Zárate, Buenos Aires
- Position: Forward

Senior career*
Years	Team	Apps	(Gls)
- Boca Juniors

International career^{‡}
	Argentina	3	(0)
- * Club domestic league appearances and goals ‡ National team caps and goals as of 29 September 2003

María Elizabeth Villanueva (born 29 October 1974) is an Argentine women's international footballer who plays as a forward. She is a member of the Argentina women's national football team. She was part of the team at the 2003 FIFA Women's World Cup. At the club level, she plays for Boca Juniors in Argentina.
