= 1998 South American Women's Football Championship =

Campeonato Sudamericano de Fútbol Femenino de 1998

Tournament details
- Host country: Argentina
- Dates: 1–15 March
- Teams: 10 (from 1 confederation)
- Venue: 1 (in 1 host city)

Final positions
- Champions: Brazil (3rd title)
- Runners-up: Argentina
- Third place: Peru
- Fourth place: Ecuador

Tournament statistics
- Matches played: 24
- Goals scored: 143 (5.96 per match)
- Top scorer: (Brazil) Roseli (16 goals)
- Fair play award: Argentina

The 1998 South American Women's Football Championship (Campeonato Sudamericano de Fútbol Femenino 1998) was held in Mar del Plata, Argentina between 1 & 15 March. It was the third staging of the Sudamericano Femenino and determined the CONMEBOL's qualifiers for the 1999 FIFA Women's World Cup.

This was the first Sudamericano Femenino to feature all 10 CONMEBOL confederations' women's national teams. Brazil won the tournament for the third time after beating Argentina 7–1 in the final. Brazil qualified directly to the Women's World Cup and Argentina faced Mexico in two play-off matches for qualification.

Argentina was confirmed as hosts in November 1997.

== Venue ==
The only venue used for the tournament was the Estadio José María Minella, located in Mar del Plata.

Mar del Plata
Estadio José María Minella
Capacity: 35.354
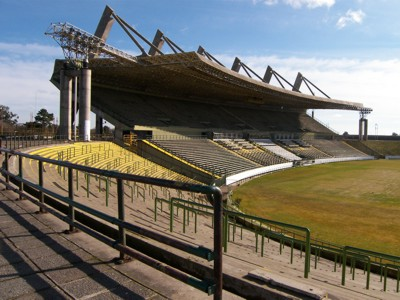

== Officials ==
The following referees were named for the tournament:

- (Argentina) Claudio Martín
- (Bolivia) Edgar Solíz
- (Chile) Rubén Selman
- (Colombia) Martha Toro
- (Ecuador) Rafael Jarrín
- (Uruguay) Oliver Viera

== Results ==
The ten teams were divided into two groups of five teams each. The top two teams in the groups advanced to the semi-finals. The winner of the tournament qualified for the 1999 FIFA Women's World Cup in the United States.

Three points were awarded for a win, one point for a draw, and zero points for a loss.

- Tie-breaker
  - If teams finish leveled on points, the following tie-breakers are used:
  1. greater goal difference in all group games;
  2. greater number of goals scored in all group games;
  3. winner of the head-to-head match between the teams in question;
  4. drawing of lots.

=== Group stage ===
Key to colours in group tables
Group winners and runners-up advance to the semi-finals

==== Group A ====
Team	Pld	W	D	L	GF	GA	GD	Pts
Brazil	4	4	0	0	48	1	+47	12
Peru	4	3	0	1	5	17	–12	9
Colombia	4	2	0	2	11	16	–5	6
Chile	4	1	0	3	6	13	–7	3
Venezuela	4	0	0	4	2	25	–23	0

2 March 1998
14:00 (UTC-3)

Colombia	4–1	Venezuela
Valencia (?) (?); Vanegas (olympic goal); Grisales (?)	Report	??? (?)

Estadio José María Minella, Mar del Plata
2 March 1998
16:00 (UTC-3)

Brazil	15–0	Peru

Estadio José María Minella, Mar del Plata
Referee: Claudio Martín (Argentina)

4 March 1998
16:00 (UTC-3)

Chile	5–0	Venezuela
Lazo 6' 63'; González 60' 74' 76'	Report

Estadio José María Minella, Mar del Plata

5 March 1998
17:10 (UTC-3)

Brazil	12–1	Colombia
		Díaz

Estadio José María Minella, Mar del Plata
Referee: Rafael Jarrín (Ecuador)

6 March 1998
14:00 (UTC-3)

Chile	0–1	Peru
	Report	Quintana 8'

Estadio José María Minella, Mar del Plata
6 March 1998
16:00 (UTC-3)

Brazil	14–0	Venezuela
Kátia (?); Roseli (?); Suzana (?); Nenê (?); Pretinha (?); Elsi (?); Elane (?); Maycon (?)	Report

Estadio José María Minella, Mar del Plata
Referee: Claudio Martín (Argentina)

8 March 1998

Venezuela	1–2	Peru
Infante (?)	Report	Ayres 20'; Hoyle 56'

Estadio José María Minella, Mar del Plata
8 March 1998

Chile	1–5	Colombia
Alburquerque (?)	Report	Valencia (?) (?); Grisales (?); Chala (?)

Estadio José María Minella, Mar del Plata

10 March 1998
16:00 (UTC-3)

Colombia	1–2	Peru
Valencia 39'	Report	Salinas 80'; Quintana 83'

Estadio José María Minella, Mar del Plata
10 March 1998

Brazil	7–0	Chile

Estadio José María Minella, Mar del Plata
Referee: Edgar Solíz (Bolivia)

==== Group B ====
Team	Pld	W	D	L	GF	GA	GD	Pts
Argentina	4	4	0	0	16	1	+15	12
Ecuador	4	2	1	1	10	6	+4	7
Paraguay	4	2	0	2	6	10	–4	6
Uruguay	4	0	2	2	6	8	–2	2
Bolivia	4	0	1	3	5	18	–13	1

1 March 1998
14:00 (UTC-3)

Paraguay	3–2	Uruguay
Giménez (?) (?); Cuevas (?) (?) (?)	Report	Arrúa (?); Soria (?)

Estadio José María Minella, Mar del Plata
1 March 1998
16:00 (UTC-3)

Argentina	9–0	Bolivia
Achával 37'; Villanueva 38'; Morales 45', 71'; Gaitán 52', 68'; Trujillo 57'; Núñez 76'; Ochotorena 79'	Report

Estadio José María Minella, Mar del Plata
Attendance: 500
Referee: Rubén Selman (Chile)

3 March 1998

Uruguay	2–2	Ecuador

Estadio José María Minella, Mar del Plata
3 March 1998

Argentina	3–0	Paraguay
Villanueva (?); Baca (?); Núñez (?)	Report

Estadio José María Minella, Mar del Plata

5 March 1998
15:10 (UTC-3)

Argentina	2–1	Uruguay

Estadio José María Minella, Mar del Plata
5 March 1998
13:10 (UTC-3)

Ecuador	5–2	Bolivia

Estadio José María Minella, Mar del Plata

7 March 1998

Ecuador	3–0	Paraguay

Estadio José María Minella, Mar del Plata
7 March 1998

Uruguay	1–1	Bolivia

Estadio José María Minella, Mar del Plata

9 March 1998

Bolivia	2–3	Paraguay
		Cuevas (?)

Estadio José María Minella, Mar del Plata
9 March 1998

Argentina	2–0	Ecuador
Morales (?); Baca (?)	Report

Estadio José María Minella, Mar del Plata

== Knockout stage ==
=== Bracket ===
Semi-finals
13 March
Brazil	11
Ecuador	1
13 March
Argentina (p)	1 (4)
Peru	1 (3)

Final
15 March
Brazil	7
Argentina	1
Third place
15 March
Ecuador	3 (4)
Peru (p)	3 (5)

=== Semi-finals ===
13 March 1998

Brazil	11–1	Ecuador

Estadio José María Minella, Mar del Plata
Referee: Oliver Viera (Uruguay)
13 March 1998

Argentina	1–1 (a.e.t.)	Peru
Villanueva (1H)		Salinas (2H)
Penalties
Villanueva (penalty scored); Peralta (penalty scored); Salomón (penalty scored); Arce (penalty scored)	4–3	(penalty scored) Salinas; (penalty scored) Villacrez; (penalty scored) Ángulo

Estadio José María Minella, Mar del Plata

=== Third place playoff ===
15 March 1998
10:10 (UTC-3)

Peru	3–3 (a.e.t.)	Ecuador
Salinas
Penalties
	5–4

Estadio José María Minella, Mar del Plata

=== Final ===
15 March 1998
12:10 (UTC-3)

Brazil	7–1	Argentina
Roseli 10', 21' (pen.), 59'; Formiga 18' (pen.); Pretinha 54'; Cidinha 65'; Sissi 76'	Report	Gerez 58'

Estadio José María Minella, Mar del Plata
Attendance: 2,500
Referee: Martha Toro (Colombia)

Brazil won the tournament and qualified for the 1999 FIFA Women's World Cup. Argentina advanced to the CONMEBOL/CONCACAF Intercontinental play-off.

== Awards ==
1998 Sudamericano Femenino winners

Brazil
Third title

== Statistics ==
=== Goalscorers ===
16 goals

- (Brazil) Roseli

6 goals

- (Colombia) Sandra Valencia

5 goals

- (Peru) Olienka Salinas

4 goals

- (Brazil) Kátia
- (Paraguay) Irma Cuevas

3 goals

- (Argentina) Karina Morales
- (Argentina) María Villanueva
- (Chile) Lara González

2 goals

- (Argentina) Liliana Baca
- (Argentina) Sandra Núñez
- (Argentina) Yanina Gaitán
- (Brazil) Pretinha
- (Brazil) Suzana
- (Chile) Macarena Lazo
- (Peru) Susana Quintana

1 goal

- (Argentina) Julia Achával
- (Argentina) Marisa Gerez
- (Argentina) Fabiana Ochotorena
- (Argentina) Fernanda Trujillo
- (Brazil) Cidinha
- (Brazil) Elane
- (Brazil) Elsi
- (Brazil) Formiga
- (Brazil) Maycon
- (Brazil) Nenê
- (Brazil) Sissi
- (Chile) Ximena Alburquerque
- (Colombia) Sonia Chala
- (Colombia) Patricia Díaz
- (Colombia) Luz Grisales
- (Paraguay) Miriam Giménez
- (Peru) Viviana Arce
- (Peru) Rossana Hoyle
- (Uruguay) Carla Arrúa
- (Uruguay) Rossana Soria
- (Venezuela) Milagros Infante

Unknown goalscorers

- Argentina: 2 additional goals
- Brazil: 35 additional goals
- Bolivia: 5 additional goals
- Colombia: 2 additional goals
- Ecuador: 14 additional goals
- Paraguay: 1 additional goal
- Uruguay: 4 additional goals
- Venezuela: 1 additional goal
