= Marisol Medina =

Argentine footballer

Personal information
- Date of birth: 11 May 1980 (age 46)
- Height: 1.68 m (5 ft 6 in)
- Position: Forward

International career^{‡}
Years	Team	Apps	(Gls)
	Argentina	2	(0)
- ‡ National team caps and goals as of 29 September 2003

Marisol Medina (born 11 May 1980) is an Argentine women's international footballer who plays as a forward. She is a member of the Argentina women's national football team. She was part of the team at the 2003 FIFA Women's World Cup.
