= 2003 South American Women's Football Championship =

Campeonato Sudamericano de Fútbol Femenino de 2003

Tournament details
- Host countries: Peru (Group A and final round); Ecuador (Group B); Argentina (Group C)
- Dates: 9–27 April
- Teams: 10 (from 1 confederation)
- Venues: 3 (in 3 host cities)

Final positions
- Champions: Brazil (4th title)
- Runners-up: Argentina
- Third place: Colombia
- Fourth place: Peru

Tournament statistics
- Matches played: 15
- Goals scored: 70 (4.67 per match)
- Top scorer: (Argentina) Marisol Medina (7 goals)

The 2003 South American Women's Football Championship (Campeonato Sudamericano de Fútbol Femenino 2003) was the fourth staging of the South American Women's Football Championship and determined the CONMEBOL's qualifiers for the 2003 FIFA Women's World Cup. The tournament was held between 9 and 27 April.

Originally, the competition was scheduled to take place from April 5 to April 16, 2002 in Córdoba, Argentina. Later, it was moved to Peru, January/February 2003, with Lima as venue, only for group A and the final round. Argentina retained the hosting rights for group C while Ecuador was appointed as host of the group B, which was played in Loja.

Brazil won the tournament for the fourth time in a row, after finishing first in the final round. Also, they qualified for the FIFA Women's World Cup along with Argentina, the runners-up.

== Venues ==
Three venues (located in three different countries) were used for the tournament:

Country	Stadium	City	Capacity
Argentina	Estadio Padre Ernesto Martearena	Salta	20,408
Ecuador	Estadio Federativo Reina del Cisne	Loja	14,935
Peru	Estadio Monumental "U"	Lima	80,093

== Officials ==
The following referees and assistant referees were named for the tournament:

Country	Referee	Assistant
Argentina	Florencia Romano	Alejandra Cercato; Sabrina Lois
Bolivia	Cándida Colque; María Teresa Alvarado	Aracely Castro
Brazil	Suell Tortura; Silvia Oliveira Carvalho	Marlei Silva
Colombia	María García	Adriana Correa
Ecuador	—	Rosa Canales
Peru	Riabel Trujillo	Ana Pérez
Uruguay	Patricia da Silva	Laura Geymonat
Venezuela	Marisela Contreras	Maritza Rodríguez

== Results ==
In contrast to previous tournaments, this edition's format had a first round with three regional groups, where the first-placed teams joined Brazil (who got a bye to the second round after winning the previous edition) for a final tournament in Peru.

The final tournament was set up in a round-robin format, where each team played one match against each of the other teams within the group. The top two teams in the group qualified for the 2003 FIFA Women's World Cup in the United States, and the first-placed team won the tournament.

Three points were awarded for a win, one point for a draw, and zero points for a loss.

Tie-breaking criteria

Teams were ranked on the following criteria:

1. Greater number of points in all group matches
2. Goal difference in all group matches
3. Greater number of goals scored in all group matches
4. Head-to-head results
5. Drawing of lots by the CONMEBOL Organising Committee

Key to colours in group tables
Group winners advance to the final round

=== First round ===
==== Group A ====
- All matches were held in Lima, Peru.
- Times listed were UTC–5.

Team	Pld	W	D	L	GF	GA	GD	Pts
Peru	2	2	0	0	5	2	+3	6
Bolivia	2	1	0	1	8	4	+4	3
Chile	2	0	0	2	2	9	–7	0

9 April 2003
15:30

Peru	3–1	Bolivia
Salinas 18', 70' (pen.); Mori 55'	Report	Zamorano 34'

Estadio Monumental "U", Lima
Referee: María García (Colombia)

11 April 2003
15:30

Bolivia	7–1	Chile
Zamorano 13', 20', 43'; Moreno 54'; E. Pérez 56'; S. Pérez 62'; Urgel 77'	Report	Gálvez 90' (pen.)

Estadio Monumental "U", Lima
Referee: Marisela Contreras (Venezuela)

13 April 2003
15:30

Peru	2–1	Chile
Bosmans 51'; Tristán 80'	Report	Castro 44'

Estadio Monumental "U", Lima
Referee: Suell Tortura (Brazil)

==== Group B ====
- All matches were held in Loja, Ecuador.
- Times listed were UTC–5.

Team	Pld	W	D	L	GF	GA	GD	Pts
Colombia	2	1	1	0	9	1	+8	4
Ecuador	2	1	1	0	3	1	+2	4
Venezuela	2	0	0	2	0	10	–10	0

9 April 2003
19:30

Ecuador	2–0	Venezuela
Villón 71', 90'	Report

Estadio Federativo Reina del Cisne, Loja
Referee: Cándida Colque (Bolivia)

11 April 2003
19:30

Colombia	8–0	Venezuela
Valencia 10', 86'; Imbachi 33'; Miranda 49'; Garzón 58', 59'; Gutiérrez 80'; Munera 90'	Report

Estadio Federativo Reina del Cisne, Loja
Referee: Florencia Romano (Argentina)

13 April 2003
13:15

Ecuador	1–1	Colombia
Campi 45'	Report	Valencia 46'

Estadio Federativo Reina del Cisne, Loja
Referee: Patricia da Silva (referee) (Uruguay)

==== Group C ====
- All matches were held in Salta, Argentina.
- Times listed were UTC–3.

Team	Pld	W	D	L	GF	GA	GD	Pts
Argentina	2	2	0	0	11	0	+11	6
Paraguay	2	1	0	1	3	4	–1	3
Uruguay	2	0	0	2	1	11	–10	0

9 April 2003
21:30

Argentina	3–0	Paraguay
Jiménez 41'; Medina 65', 72'	Report

Estadio Padre Ernesto Martearena, Salta
Referee: María Alvarado (Bolivia)

11 April 2003
21:30

Uruguay	1–3	Paraguay
Lemos 27'	Report	Agüero 11'; Rodas 56'; Román 72'

Estadio Padre Ernesto Martearena, Salta
Referee: Riabel Trujillo (Peru)

13 April 2003
16:30

Argentina	8–0	Uruguay
Jiménez 5'; Gatti 32'; Alvariza 35' (pen.), 79'; Medina 46', 49', 51', 81'	Report

Estadio Padre Ernesto Martearena, Salta
Referee: Silvia Oliveira (Brazil)

=== Final round ===
- All matches were held in Lima, Peru.
- Times listed were UTC–5.

Team	Pld	W	D	L	GF	GA	GD	Pts
Brazil	3	3	0	0	18	2	+16	9
Argentina	3	1	1	1	6	6	0	4
Colombia	3	1	0	2	3	15	–12	3
Peru	3	0	1	2	1	5	–4	1

23 April 2003
13:30

Brazil	3–2	Argentina
Kátia 1'; Pretinha 7'; Rosana 54'	Report	Gatti 49'; Almeida 71'

Estadio Monumental "U", Lima
Referee: Patricia da Silva (referee) (Uruguay)
23 April 2003
15:30

Peru	0–1	Colombia
	Report	Valencia 18'

Estadio Monumental "U", Lima
Referee: Cándida Colque (Bolivia)

25 April 2003
13:30

Colombia	2–3	Argentina
Ordóñez 5'; Valencia 33'	Report	Gómez 25'; Alvariza 43'; Gerez 71'

Estadio Monumental "U", Lima
Referee: Marisela Contreras (Venezuela)
25 April 2003
15:30

Brazil	3–0	Peru
Formiga 26'; Pretinha 30'; Marta 53'	Report

Estadio Monumental "U", Lima
Referee: María Teresa Alvarado (Bolivia)

27 April 2003
13:30

Brazil	12–0	Colombia
Pretinha 7', 15'; Formiga 22'; Marta 34', 50', 70' (pen.); Kátia 42', 44', 74', 82', 89'; Cristiane 80'	Report

Estadio Monumental "U", Lima
Referee: Marisela Contreras (Venezuela)
27 April 2003
15:30

Peru	1–1	Argentina
Dávila 7'	Report	Medina 88'

Estadio Monumental "U", Lima
Referee: Patricia da Silva (referee) (Uruguay)

Brazil won the tournament and qualified for the 2003 FIFA Women's World Cup along with runners-up Argentina.

== Awards ==
2003 Sudamericano Femenino winners

Brazil
Fourth title

== Statistics ==
=== Goalscorers ===
7 goals

- (Argentina) Marisol Medina

6 goals

- (Brazil) Kátia

5 goals

- (Colombia) Sandra Valencia

4 goals

- (Bolivia) Maitté Zamorano
- (Brazil) Marta
- (Brazil) Pretinha

3 goals

- (Argentina) Karina Alvariza

2 goals

- (Argentina) Natalia Gatti
- (Argentina) Alejandra Jiménez
- (Brazil) Formiga
- (Colombia) Ángela Garzón
- (Ecuador) Wendy Villón
- (Peru) Olienka Salinas

1 goal

- (Argentina) Analía Almeida
- (Argentina) Marisa Gerez
- (Argentina) Rosana Gómez
- (Bolivia) Deisy Moreno
- (Bolivia) Elizabeth Pérez
- (Bolivia) Shirley Pérez
- (Bolivia) María Teresa Urgel
- (Brazil) Cristiane
- (Brazil) Rosana
- (Chile) María Castro
- (Chile) Angelina Galvez
- (Colombia) Claudia Gutiérrez
- (Colombia) Nelia Imbachi
- (Colombia) Sonia Miranda
- (Colombia) Paulina Munera
- (Colombia) Leidy Ordóñez
- (Ecuador) Gretel Campi
- (Paraguay) Francisca Agüero
- (Paraguay) Nadia Rodas
- (Paraguay) Rossana Román
- (Peru) Lorena Bosmans
- (Peru) Adriana Dávila
- (Peru) Martha Mori
- (Peru) Miryam Tristán
- (Uruguay) Gessika Lemos

=== Final ranking ===
Pos	Team	Pld	W	D	L	GF	GA	GD	Pts
1	Brazil	3	3	0	0	18	2	+16	9
2	Argentina	5	3	1	1	17	6	+11	10
3	Colombia	5	2	1	2	12	16	–4	7
4	Peru	5	2	1	2	6	7	–1	7
Eliminated in the first round
5	Ecuador	2	1	1	0	3	1	+2	4
6	Bolivia	2	1	0	1	8	4	+4	3
7	Paraguay	2	1	0	1	3	4	–1	3
8	Chile	2	0	0	2	2	9	–7	0
9	Uruguay	2	0	0	2	1	11	–10	0
10	Venezuela	2	0	0	2	0	10	–10	0
