= Ecuador women's national football team =

Women's national association football team representing Ecuador

Ecuador
- Nickname: La Tricolor (Three colors)
- Association: Federación Ecuador de Fútbol
- Confederation: CONMEBOL (South America)
- Head coach: Eva Espejo
- Captain: Ligia Moreira
- Home stadium: Estadio Olímpico Atahualpa
- FIFA code: ECU
First colours	Second colours

FIFA ranking
- Current: 61 ▲2 (16 June 2026)
- Highest: 46 (December 2014)
- Lowest: 69 (June 2024; August 2025)

First international
- Brazil 13–0 Ecuador (Uberlândia, Brazil; 8 January 1995)

Biggest win
- Ecuador 6–1 Bolivia (Uberlândia, Brazil; 14 January 1995); Bolivia 1–6 Ecuador (Cali, Colombia; 8 July 2022); Bolivia 0–5 Ecuador (Santa Cruz de la Sierra, Bolivia; 18 February 2023)

Biggest defeat
- Brazil 13–0 Ecuador (Uberlândia, Brazil; 8 January 1995)

World Cup
- Appearances: 1 (first in 2015)
- Best result: Group stage (2015)

Copa América
- Appearances: 9 (first in 1995)
- Best result: Third place (2014)

The Ecuador women's national football team (Spanish: Selección femenina de fútbol de Ecuador) represents Ecuador in international women's football. The team is controlled by the Ecuadorian Football Federation.

It made its debut in the 1995 Sudamericano. In the next edition three years later it reached the semifinals, its best result to date, losing the bronze play-off against Peru. In the 2006 edition, it ranked fifth, qualifying for the first time for the Pan American Games. It subsequently hosted the 2010 Sudamericano, narrowly missing the semifinals after tying at 9 points with Argentina and Chile.

Although football is not popular for women, Ecuador marked their first-ever participation in a Women's World Cup in the Canada 2015, and also for the first time both men's and women's team participated in World Cup.

== History ==
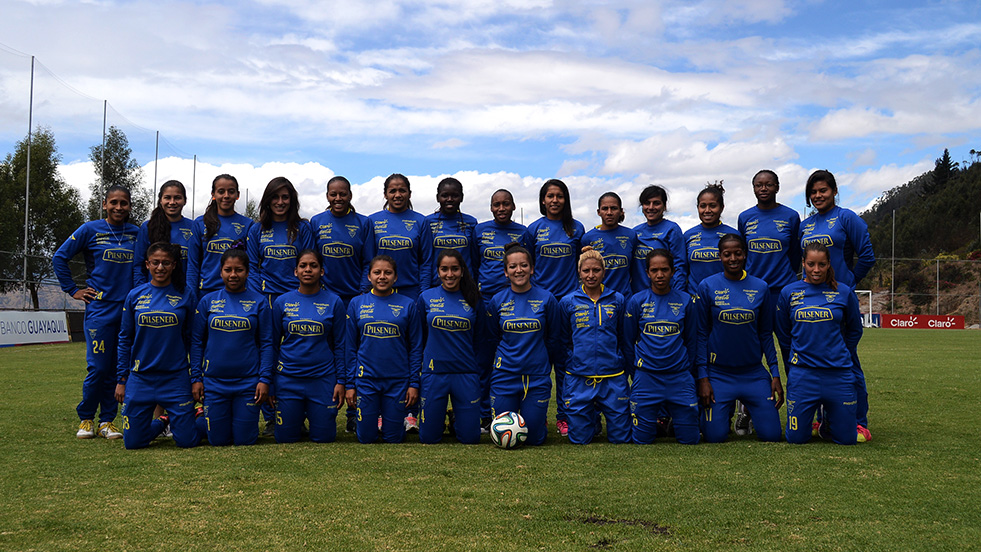
The women's national team in August 2014 (Photo: Carlos Rodríguez L./Andes)

The women's national football team of Ecuador began in 1995, when the FEF scrapped together a team with players from provincial selectives and some existing clubs to compete in the South American Women's Football Championship. In 2005 a provincial selective was held, and teams were told that the winner would represent the national team. A team from Quito won, but Conmebol disqualified it as it was not a national selective. At this time no women's tournament existed neither professional nor amateur. As the base of relative success, club competition is the source to compete against national counterparts, and so as early as 2013 began the Campeonato Ecuatoriano de Futbol Femenino. With the Ministry of Sports impulsing such initiatives, the championship is mandating of at least 2 under 18 players, thinking of the Women's Sudamericano Sub 17.

The country qualified for the 2015 FIFA Women's World Cup after successfully winning the playoff against CONCACAF representative Trinidad and Tobago, but with only amateur and part-time players on the squad, Ecuador was thumped in three games, including the record 1–10 defeat to Switzerland. Nonetheless, Ecuador impressed in their final defeat to defending champions Japan, only conceded a goal in the team's 0–1 loss. Ecuador stood as the worst performed team in a FIFA Women's World Cup edition before Thailand surpassed Ecuador with an even more disastrous performance in 2019 FIFA Women's World Cup.

In 2019, the Ecuadorian Football Federation officially created the semi-professional Superliga Femenina, the first step toward moving to professional women's football for the team and a recognition for the team's growing popularity, and Ecuador's performance greatly improved in the 2022 Copa América Femenina. Nonetheless, Ecuador's lacklustre performance again hurt its campaign when the team lost three out of four, and failed to qualify for the 2023 FIFA Women's World Cup, though Ecuador did not suffer heavy defeats as expected.

== Team image ==
=== Nicknames ===
The Ecuador women's national football team has been known or nicknamed as the "La Tricolor (Three colors)".

=== Home stadium ===
Ecuador play their home matches on the Estadio Olímpico Atahualpa.

== Overall competitive record ==
Competition	Stage	Result	Opponent	Position	Scorers
(Brazil) 1995 Sudamericano	Single round	0–13; 1–5; 2–2; 6–1	Brazil; Argentina; Chile; Bolivia	4 / 5	
(Argentina) 1998 Sudamericano	First round	2–2; 5–2; 3–0; 0–2	Uruguay; Bolivia; Paraguay; Argentina	2 / 5	
(Argentina) 1998 Sudamericano	Semifinals	1–11	Brazil		
(Argentina) 1998 Sudamericano	3rd place	3–3 (PSO: 4–5)	Peru		
(Peru) 2003 Sudamericano	First round	2–0; 1–1	Venezuela; Colombia	2 / 3	Villón 2 Campi
(Argentina) 2006 Sudamericano	First round	2–1; 0–1; 2–2; 0–1	Chile; Argentina; Colombia; Uruguay	3 / 5	Velarde 2 Velarde, Vivas
(Brazil) 2007 Pan-American Games	First round	0–1; 0–4; 0–10; 4–2	Jamaica; Canada; Brazil; Uruguay	4 / 5	Quinteros 2, Freire, Pesantes
(Ecuador) 2010 Sudamericano	First round	1–2; 2–1; 4–3; 1–0	Chile; Peru; Bolivia; Argentina	3 / 5	Quinteros; Quinteros, Palacios; Sánchez 2, Freire, Quinteros; Rodríguez
(Ecuador) 2014 Sudamericano	First round	1–0; 1–0; 0–1; 1–2	Peru; Venezuela; Colombia; Uruguay	2 / 5	Barre; Vázquez Lattanzio
(Ecuador) 2014 Sudamericano	Second round	0–4; 1–2; 3–2	Brazil; Colombia; Argentina	3 / 4	Lattanzio; Caicedo, Rodríguez, Lattanzio
(Canada) 2015 FIFA Women's World Cup	Group C	0–6; 1–10; 0–1	Cameroon; Switzerland; Japan	4 / 4	Angie Ponce

== Results and fixtures ==
The following is a list of match results in the last 12 months, as well as any future matches that have been scheduled.

Legend

Win Draw Loss Fixture

=== 2025 ===
24 October 2025–26 CONMEBOL Liga de Naciones Femenina	Bolivia	0–4	Ecuador	El Alto, Bolivia
17:00 UTC−4		Report (FIFA); Report (CONMEBOL)	Rodríguez 3'; Cedeño 50'; Barahona 78'; Flores 86'	Stadium: El Alto Municipal Stadium; Referee: Anahí Fernández (Uruguay)

28 October 2025–26 CONMEBOL Liga de Naciones Femenina	Ecuador	1–2	Colombia	Quito, Ecuador
18:00 UTC−5	Bolaños 52' (pen.)	Report (FIFA); Report (CONMEBOL)	Santos 45' (pen.); Montoya 71'	Stadium: Estadio Rodrigo Paz Delgado; Referee: Zulma Quiñónez (Paraguay)

28 November 2025–26 CONMEBOL Liga de Naciones Femenina	Ecuador	0-0	Venezuela	Quito, Ecuador
18:00 –5		Report (FIFA); Report (CONMEBOL)		Stadium: Estadio Olímpico Atahualpa, Quito; Referee: Adriana Farfán (Bolivia)

2 December 2025–26 CONMEBOL Liga de Naciones Femenina	Uruguay	0-0	Ecuador	Montevideo, Uruguay
18:00 UTC−3		Report (FIFA); Report (CONMEBOL)		Stadium: Estadio Alfredo Victor Viera; Referee: Charly Deretti (Brazil)

=== 2026 ===
10 April 2025–26 CONMEBOL Liga de Naciones Femenina	Paraguay	2–0	Ecuador	Asunción, Paraguay
20:00 UTC−3	Ramos 32'; Arrieta 90+8' (pen.)	Report		Stadium: Estadio Defensores del Chaco; Referee: Anahí Fernández (Uruguay)

18 April 2025–26 CONMEBOL Liga de Naciones Femenina	Ecuador	1–0	Peru	Quito, Ecuador
16:00 UTC−5	Bolaños 77' (pen.)	Report		Stadium: Estadio Rodrigo Paz Delgado; Referee: Daiane Muniz (Brazil)

5 June 2025–26 CONMEBOL Liga de Naciones Femenina	Chile	1–2	Ecuador	Santiago, Chile
19:00 UTC−4	Pardo 73'	Report	Cuadra 36'; Bolaños 80' (pen.)	Stadium: Estadio Nacional Julio Martínez Prádanos; Referee: Anahí Fernández (Uruguay)

9 June 2025–26 CONMEBOL Liga de Naciones Femenina	Ecuador	0–1	Argentina	Quito, Ecuador
18:00 UTC−5		Report	Bonsegundo 90+5'	Stadium: Estadio Rodrigo Paz Delgado; Referee: Edina Alves (Brazil)

28 November 2027 FIFA Women's World Cup qualification	Ghana	–	Ecuador	Salé, Morocco
19:00 UTC+0				Stadium: Mohammed VI Football Academy

1 December 2027 FIFA Women's World Cup qualification	South Africa	–	Ecuador	Salé, Morocco
19:00 UTC+0				Stadium: Mohammed VI Football Academy

5 December 2027 FIFA Women's World Cup qualification	Chinese Taipei	–	Ecuador	Salé, Morocco
17:00 UTC+0				Stadium: Mohammed VI Football Academy

- Fixtures and results – Soccerway

== Coaching staff ==
=== Current coaching staff ===
Updated as 26/01/2024

Position	Name	Ref.
Head coach		
Assistant coach		
Goalkeeping coach		
Fitness coach		

=== Manager history ===
- Garys Estupiñán (2003–2006)
- Juan Carlos Cerón (2010)
- Vanessa Arauz (2014–2015)
- Wendy Villón (2018)
- (Portugal) Emily Lima (2019–2022)
- (Colombia) Andres Usme (2022–2024)
- (Colombia) Eduardo Moscoso (2024-2026)

== Players ==
- Up-to-date caps, goals, and statistics are not publicly available; therefore, caps and goals listed may be incorrect.

=== Current squad ===
- The following 26 players were called up for the 2025–26 CONMEBOL Liga de Naciones matches on 28 November and 2 December 2025.

No.	Pos.	Player	Date of birth (age)	Club
	GK	Kathya Mendoza	20 June 2001 (age 25)	(Ecuadorian Football Federation) Independiente del Valle
	GK	Andrea Morán	14 October 1999 (age 27)	(Argentine Football Association) Ferro Carril Oeste
	GK	Liceth Suárez	17 September 1996 (age 30)	(Ecuadorian Football Federation) LDU Quito
	DF	Justine Cuadra	17 August 1998 (age 28)	(Ecuadorian Football Federation) Barcelona
	DF	Fiorella Pico	10 June 2007 (age 19)	(Ecuadorian Football Federation) Independiente del Valle
	DF	Mayerli Rodríguez	26 December 2001 (age 24)	(Ecuadorian Football Federation) Independiente del Valle
	DF	Lia Rodríguez	–	(Ecuadorian Football Federation) Independiente del Valle
	MF	Manoly Baquerizo	15 December 1998 (age 27)	(Royal Spanish Football Federation) Granada
	MF	Kerlly Real	7 November 1998 (age 27)	(Italian Football Federation) Parma
	MF	Milagro Barahona	20 June 2002 (age 24)	(Ecuadorian Football Federation) Universidad Católica
	MF	Evelyn Burgos	19 April 2007 (age 19)	(Ecuadorian Football Federation) Independiente del Valle
	MF	Jessy Caicedo	4 July 1999 (age 27)	(Ecuadorian Football Federation) Independiente del Valle
	MF	Stefany Cedeño	6 August 2000 (age 26)	(Colombian Football Federation) Atlético Nacional
	MF	Karen Litardo	18 August 2005 (age 21)	(Ecuadorian Football Federation) Independiente del Valle
	MF	Ingrid Pianda	6 March 2004 (age 22)	(Ecuadorian Football Federation) Universidad Católica
	MF	Joselyn Espinales	19 January 1999 (age 27)	(Brazilian Football Confederation) Palmeiras
	MF	Rosa Flores	26 June 2006 (age 20)	(Ecuadorian Football Federation) LDU Quito
	FW	Nicole Charcopa	1 April 2000 (age 26)	(Ecuadorian Football Federation) Independiente del Valle
	FW	Emily Arias	16 March 2003 (age 23)	(Brazilian Football Confederation) América Mineiro
	FW	Nayely Bolaños	25 February 2003 (age 23)	(Mexican Football Federation) UNAM
	FW	Karen Flores	24 July 2001 (age 25)	(Mexican Football Federation) Atlas
	FW	Doménica Rodríguez	19 January 1999 (age 27)	(Mexican Football Federation) Santos Laguna
	FW	Yaritza Valencia	25 January 2004 (age 22)	(Ecuadorian Football Federation) Independiente del Valle

=== Recent call-ups ===
- The following players have been called up to an Ecuador squad in the past 12 months.

Pos.	Player	Date of birth (age)	Caps	Goals	Club	Latest call-up
GK	Liceth Suárez	17 September 1996 (age 30)			(Ecuador) LDU Quito	v. Colombia,28 October 2025
DF	Lía Rodríguez	–			(Ecuador) Barcelona	v. Colombia,28 October 2025
MF	Noemí Camacho	10 April 2007 (age 19)			(Ecuador) Universidad Católica	v. Colombia,28 October 2025
MF	Caprice Chiuchiolo	17 April 2007 (age 19)			(United States) GCU	v. Colombia,28 October 2025
FW	Karen Flores	24 July 2001 (age 25)			(Mexico) Atlas	v. Colombia,28 October 2025
FW	Doménica Rodríguez	19 January 1999 (age 27)			(Mexico) Santos Laguna	v. Colombia,28 October 2025

=== Captains ===
- Ligia Moreira (20??–)

== Records ==
*Active players in bold, statistics correct as of 31 August 2021.

=== Most capped players ===
#	Player	Year(s)	Caps

=== Top goalscorers ===
#	Player	Year(s)	Goals	Caps

== Competitive record ==
=== FIFA Women's World Cup ===
FIFA Women's World Cup record
Year	Result	Position	Pld	W	D*	L	GF	GA	Squad
(China) 1991	Did not enter								
(Sweden) 1995	Did not qualify								
(United States) 1999	Did not qualify								
(United States) 2003	Did not qualify								
(China) 2007	Did not qualify								
(Germany) 2011	Did not qualify								
(Canada) 2015	Group stage	24th	3	0	0	3	1	17	Squad
(France) 2019	Did not qualify								
(Australia) (New Zealand) 2023	Did not qualify								
(Brazil) 2027	To be determined								
(Costa Rica) (Jamaica) (Mexico) (United States) 2031	To be determined								
(United Kingdom) 2035	To be determined								
Total	Group stage	1/10	3	0	0	3	1	17	

*Draws include knockout matches decided on penalty kicks.

FIFA Women's World Cup history
Year	Round	Date	Opponent	Result	Stadium
(Canada) 2015	Group stage	8 June	Cameroon	**L** 0–6	BC Place, Vancouver
(Canada) 2015	Group stage	12 June	Switzerland	**L** 1–10	BC Place, Vancouver
(Canada) 2015	Group stage	16 June	Japan	**L** 0–1	Winnipeg Stadium, Winnipeg

=== Olympic Games ===
Summer Olympics record
Year	Result	Pld	W	D*	L	GF	GA
(United States) 1996	Did not qualify						
(Australia) 2000	Did not qualify						
(Greece) 2004	Did not qualify						
(China) 2008	Did not qualify						
(United Kingdom) 2012	Did not qualify						
(Brazil) 2016	Did not qualify						
(Japan) 2020	Did not qualify						
(France) 2024	Did not qualify						
Total	–	–	–	–	–	–	–

*Draws include knockout matches decided on penalty kicks.

=== CONMEBOL Copa América Femenina ===
CONMEBOL Copa América Femenina record
Year	Result	Pld	W	D*	L	GF	GA
(Brazil) 1991	Did not enter						
(Brazil) 1995	Group stage	4	1	1	2	9	21
(Argentina) 1998	Fourth place	6	2	2	2	14	20
(Peru) (Ecuador) (Argentina) 2003	Group stage	2	1	1	0	3	1
(Argentina) 2006	Group stage	4	1	1	2	4	5
(Ecuador) 2010	Group stage	4	3	0	1	8	6
(Ecuador) 2014	Third place	7	3	0	4	7	11
(Chile) 2018	Group stage	4	0	0	4	3	16
(Colombia) 2022	Group stage	4	1	0	3	9	7
(Ecuador) 2025	Group stage	4	1	1	2	6	7
Total	9/10	39	13	6	20	63	94

*Draws include knockout matches decided on penalty kicks.

=== Pan American Games ===
Pan American Games record
Year	Result	Position	Pld	W	D*	L	GF	GA	Squad
(Canada) 1999	Did not enter								
(Dominican Republic) 2003	Did not enter								
(Brazil) 2007	Group stage	7th	4	1	0	3	4	17	Squad
(Mexico) 2011	Did not qualify								
(Canada) 2015	Group stage	6th	3	1	0	2	5	12	Squad
(Peru) 2019	Did not qualify								
(Chile) 2023	Did not qualify								
(Peru) 2027	To be determined								
Total	Group stage	2/6	7	2	0	5	9	29	

*Draws include knockout matches decided on penalty kicks.

=== Bolivarian Games ===
Bolivarian Games record
Year	Result	Pld	W	D*	L	GF	GA
(Colombia) 2005	Bronze Medal	6	2	1	3	6	13
(Bolivia) 2009	Silver Medal	4	3	0	1	7	2
(Peru) 2013 to present	U-20 Tournament						
Total	Silver Medal	10	5	1	4	13	15

*Draws include knockout matches decided on penalty kicks.

== Honours ==
=== Major competitions ===
- **Copa América Femenina**
  - (bronze) Third place: (1) 2014

=== Regional ===
- **Bolivarian Games**
  - (silver) Silver Medalists (1): 2009
  - (bronze) Bronze Medalists (1): 2005

== See also ==
- Sport in Ecuador
  - Football in Ecuador
    - Women's football in Ecuador
- Ecuador women's national football team
  - Ecuador women's national football team results
  - List of Ecuador women's international footballers
- Ecuador women's national under-20 football team
- Ecuador women's national under-17 football team
- Ecuador women's national futsal team
- Ecuador men's national football team
- Gaby Malave
