= Peru women's national football team =

Women's national football team representing Peru

Peru
- Nickname(s): La Bicolor (The Bicolour); La Blanquirroja (The White and Red); La Rojiblanca (The Red and White)
- Association: Peruvian Football Federation (FPF)
- Confederation: CONMEBOL (South America)
- Head coach: Antonio Spinelli
- Captain: Mía León
- Top scorer: Miryam Tristán (13)
- Home stadium: Estadio Félix Castillo Tardío
- FIFA code: PER
First colours	Second colours

FIFA ranking
- Current: 74 ▼1 (20 October 2026)
- Highest: 32 (May – September 2006)
- Lowest: 82 (August 2025)

First international
- Brazil 15–0 Peru (Mar del Plata, Argentina; 2 March 1998)

Biggest win
- Peru 6–1 Paraguay (Buenos Aires, Argentina; 5 December 2000)

Biggest defeat
- Brazil 15–0 Peru (Mar del Plata, Argentina; 2 March 1998)

Copa América Femenina
- Appearances: 8 (first in 1998)
- Best result: Third place (1998)
Medal record
Copa América Femenina
Bronze medal – third place	1998 Argentina	Team
Bolivarian Games
Gold medal – first place	2005 Armenia/Pereira	Team

The Peru women's national football team represents Peru in international women's football and is controlled by the Peruvian Football Federation (FPF). They have been a part of the CONMEBOL confederation since its formation in 1996. The Peruvian team has yet to qualify for a FIFA Women's World Cup and is currently ranked 73th in the FIFA Rankings.

Peru's best result in major international competitions was in the 1998 Sudamericano Femenino, where they achieved third place. They then achieved fourth place in 2003 where they jointed hosted with Argentina and Ecuador. La Blanquirroja is coached by Antonio Spinelli and plays the majority of its games in the Estadio Félix Castillo Tardío in Chincha Alta.

== History ==
In 1996 the Peruvian Peruvian Football Federation created the Peruvian Primera División Femenina under the name of Metropolitan women's football championship (currently known as Liga Femenina). On that basis, in 1998 the federation gathered its very best players into a national team, whose first international appearance was the third South American Women's Football Championship played in Argentina, in which the team achieved third place.

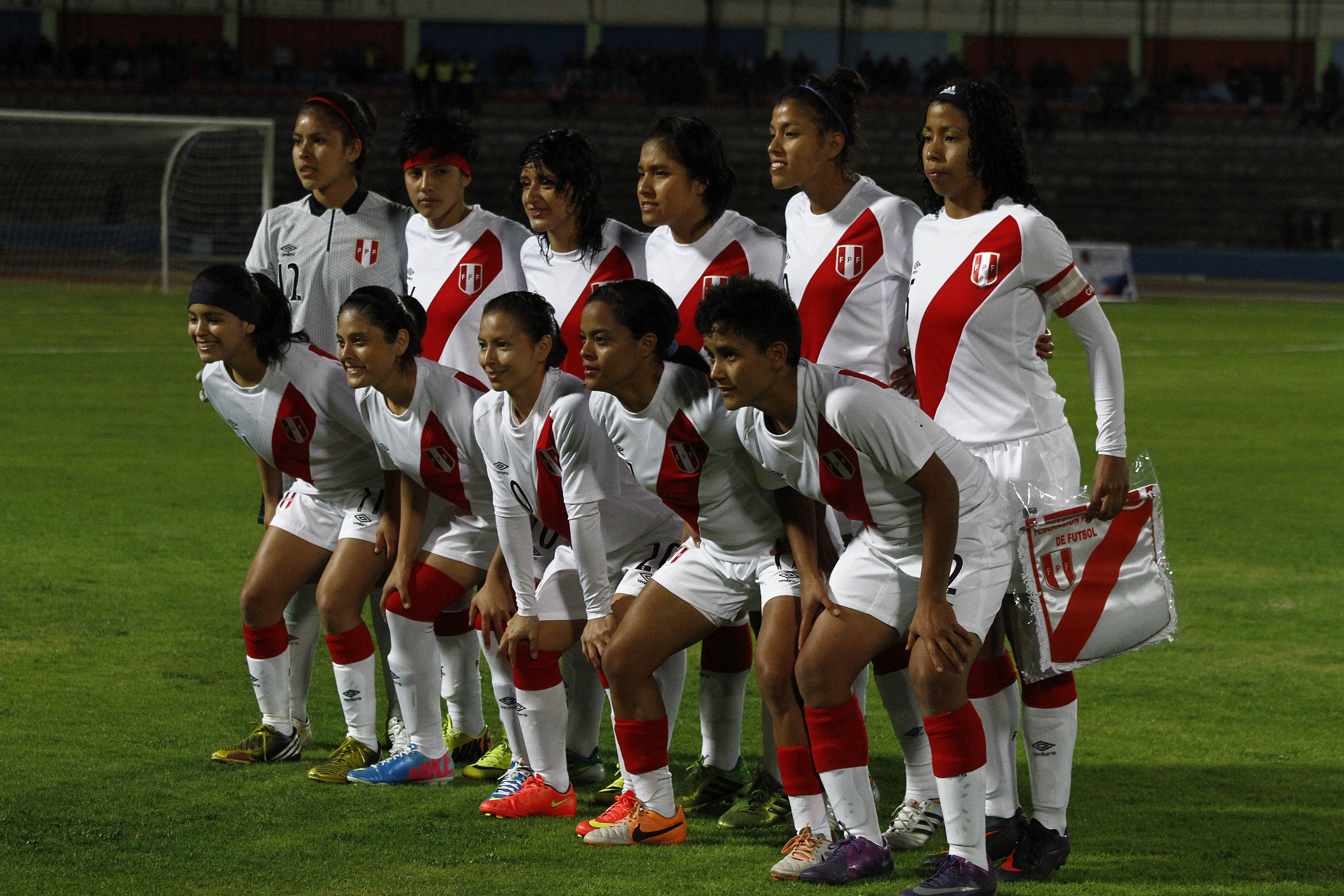
The Peruvian Squad at the 2014 Copa América Femenina

In the early 2000s, Peru gained fourth place in the 2003 South American Women's Football Championship on home soil and won the gold medal at the 2005 Bolivarian Games. The late 2010s saw a decline in Peruvian women's football, being eliminated in the group stage of the Copa America since 2003 and the same for the U-17 and U-20 team. In 2019, the team automatically qualified for the 2019 Pan American Games for the first time as hosts and placed 8th after losing to Jamaica. With only two goals scored and seven conceded, they finished last in their group with one point. They automatically qualified for the 2027 Pan American Games as hosts.

== Team image ==
=== Nicknames ===
The Peru women's national football team has been known or nicknamed as "La Blanquirroja" or "La Rojiblanca (The White And Red)". They are also often nicknamed "La Bicolor (The Bicolour)".

=== Home stadium ===
Peru plays most of their home games at the Estadio Félix Castillo Tardío. The stadium has a capacity of 14,000 and is located in Chincha Alta. The VIDENA de Chincha, also located in Chincha Alta a few blocks from the home stadium, is the home training ground of the Peru women's national team. Much like the Villa Deportiva Nacional in Lima, it features numerous training facilities and received a renovation in 2025.

== Results and fixtures ==
The following is a list of match results in the last 12 months, as well as any future matches that have been scheduled.

Win Draw Lose Fixture

=== 2025 ===
28 November 2025–26 CONMEBOL Liga de Naciones Femenina	Peru	3–1	Chile	Cusco, Peru
	Garcia 30'; Campoverde 62'; Bilcape 65'		López 41'	Stadium: Estadio Garcilaso

2 December 2025–26 CONMEBOL Liga de Naciones Femenina	Venezuela	6–0	Peru	Cabudare, Venezuela
19:00 UTC−4	Castellanos 13'; García 36'; Martínez 42'; Higuera 48', 52'; Flórez 85'	Report (FIFA); Report (CONMEBOL)		Stadium: Estadio Metropolitano de Cabudare; Referee: Zulma Quiñónez (Paraguay)

=== 2026 ===
4 March Friendly	Peru	0–4	El Salvador	Chincha Alta, Peru
		Report (FESFUT)	Gutiérrez 11'; López 38'; Domínguez 58'; Plata 67'	Stadium: Estadio Félix Castillo Tardío

7 March Friendly	Peru	0–1	El Salvador	Chincha Alta, Peru
14:30			Johannes 49'	Stadium: Estadio Félix Castillo Tardío

10 April 2025–26 CONMEBOL Liga de Naciones Femenina	Peru	2–1	Uruguay	Cusco, Peru
16:00 UTC−5	García 33'; Arévalo 71'	Report	González 25' (pen.)	Stadium: Estadio Garcilaso; Referee: Paula Fernández (Colombia)

14 April 2025–26 CONMEBOL Liga de Naciones Femenina	Peru	1–1	Paraguay	Cusco, Peru
16:00 UTC−5	Campoverde 51'	Report	Tacilla 18' (o.g.)	Stadium: Estadio Garcilaso; Referee: Adriana Farfán (Bolivia)

18 April 2025–26 CONMEBOL Liga de Naciones Femenina	Ecuador	1–0	Peru	Quito, Ecuador
16:00 UTC−5	Bolaños 77' (pen.)	Report		Stadium: Estadio Rodrigo Paz Delgado; Referee: Daiane Muniz (Brazil)

5 June 2025–26 CONMEBOL Liga de Naciones Femenina	Argentina	1–1	Peru	Lanús, Argentina (Note: The Argentina v Peru match, originally scheduled to be played at Estadio Florencio Sola, Banfield, was relocated twice.)
20:00 UTC−3	Diz 75'	Report	Cox 85'	Stadium: Estadio Ciudad de Lanús; Referee: Zulma Quiñónez (Paraguay)

9 June 2025–26 CONMEBOL Liga de Naciones Femenina	Peru	4–0	Bolivia	Callao, Peru
18:00 UTC−5	García 24' (pen.); Campoverde 57'; Cagnina 62'; Arévalo 83'	Report		Stadium: Estadio Miguel Grau; Referee: Paula Fernández (Colombia)

9 October Friendly	Peru	2–1	Philippines	Chincha Alta, Peru
15:00 UTC−5	Bilcape 1', 86'	Report	Meier , 20' (o.g.)	Stadium: Videnita de Chincha

13 October Friendly	Peru	0–2	Philippines	Chincha Alta, Peru
14:00 UTC−5		Report	Penn 20'; Ramirez 42'	Stadium: Videnita de Chincha

27 November Friendly	Peru	v	Dominican Republic	Chincha Alta, Peru
				Stadium: Videnita de Chincha

29 November Friendly	Peru	v	Dominican Republic	Chincha Alta, Peru
				Stadium: Videnita de Chincha

4 December Friendly	Germany	v	Peru	Rio de Janeiro, Brazil
18:15 UTC−3		Report

- Peru Results and Fixtures – Soccerway.com

== Coaching staff ==
=== Current coaching staff ===
Position	Staff
Head coach	(Argentina) Antonio Spinelli
Goalkeeping trainer	(Peru) Javier Cano
Team doctor	(Peru) Dr. Jaime Izaguirre
Physio	(Peru) Alberto Fernandez
Kinesiologist	(Peru) Hernán Salas

=== Manager history ===
- (Peru) Luis Sánchez (1998)
- (Peru) Luis Cruzado (2003)
- (Peru) Lizandro Barbarán (2005)
- (Peru) Lorena Bosmans (2006)
- (Peru) Lizandro Barbarán (2007–2009)
- (Peru) Jaime Duarte (2010–2012)
- (Spain) Marta Tejedor (2013–2016)
- (Peru) Vivian Ayres (2016–2018)
- (Brazil) Dorival Bueno (2018–2021)
- (Peru) Conrad Flores (2021–2023)
- (Portugal) Emily Lima (2023–2025)
- (Argentina) Antonio Spinelli (2025–present)

== Players ==
=== Current squad ===
The following players were called up for the 2025–26 CONMEBOL Liga de Naciones Femenina matches against Uruguay, Paraguay, and Ecuador on 10, 14, and 18 April, respectively.

Caps and goals are correct as of 7 March 2026, after the match against El Salvador.

No.	Pos.	Player	Date of birth (age)	Caps	Goals	Club
	GK	Maryory Sánchez	7 April 1997 (age 29)	22	0	(Colombian Football Federation) Deportivo Cali
	GK	Mia Shalit	2 July 2002 (age 24)	5	0	(Israel Football Association) Hapoel Jerusalem
	GK	Silvana Alfaro	10 June 2001 (age 25)	2	0	(Peruvian Football Federation) Universitario
	DF	Mía León (captain)	22 March 2005 (age 21)	25	3	(Mexican Football Federation) Cruz Azul
	DF	Yomira Tacilla	2 August 1996 (age 30)	11	0	(Peruvian Football Federation) Alianza Lima
	DF	Tifani Molina	15 October 2001 (age 25)	9	1	(Peruvian Football Federation) Alianza Lima
	DF	Grace Cagnina	8 May 2001 (age 25)	9	0	(Polish Football Association) Widzew Łódź
	DF	Gabriela García	15 June 2001 (age 25)	5	0	(Peruvian Football Federation) Sporting Cristal
	DF	Luana Chamochumbi	20 February 2006 (age 20)	3	0	(Peruvian Football Federation) Universitario
	DF	María Espejo	24 November 2006 (age 19)	2	0	(Peruvian Football Federation) Universitario
	DF	Olenka Gutiérrez	21 December 2000 (age 25)	2	0	(Peruvian Football Federation) Sporting Cristal
	DF	Brenda Meier	3 February 2008 (age 18)	1	0	(Swiss Football Association) St. Gallen
	MF	Claudia Cagnina	10 September 1997 (age 29)	25	0	(Norwegian Football Federation) Bodø/Glimt
	MF	Sandra Arévalo	14 April 1998 (aged 27)	18	0	(Mexican Football Federation) Atlético San Luis
	MF	Allison Azabache	15 December 2003 (age 22)	9	0	(Peruvian Football Federation) Alianza Lima
	MF	Claudia Domínguez	14 March 1998 (age 28)	5	0	(Royal Spanish Football Federation) Pozuelo
	MF	Andrea Thorisson	14 March 1998 (age 28)	4	0	(Swedish Football Association) Bollstanäs
	DF	Cherrie Cox	1 January 2004 (age 22)	2	0	(United States Soccer Federation) Long Beach
	MF	Antonela Solari	1 January 2005 (age 21)	1	0	(United States Soccer Federation) FIU Panthers
	MF	Khloe Olano	12 April 2008 (age 18)	1	0	(United States Soccer Federation) Cedar Stars Academy
	FW	Raquel Bilcape	23 August 2005 (age 21)	11	3	(Peruvian Football Federation) Melgar
	FW	Luz Campoverde	25 May 1999 (age 27)	8	1	(Peruvian Football Federation) Universitario
	FW	Alesia García	13 January 2000 (age 26)	4	1	(Hungarian Football Federation) Ferencvárosi
	FW	Sashenka Porras	16 June 2005 (age 21)	0	0	(Mexican Football Federation) Necaxa
	FW	Alessia Sanllehi	12 January 2001 (age 25)	0	0	(Peruvian Football Federation) Carlos A. Mannucci
	FW	Aldana Rodríguez	23 August 2005 (age 21)	0	0	(Peruvian Football Federation) Alianza Lima

=== Recent call ups ===
The following players were also named to a squad in the last 12 months.

Pos.	Player	Date of birth (age)	Caps	Goals	Club	Latest call-up
GK	Laura Miranda Durán	18 August 2007 (age 19)	0	0	(Spain) Futbolellas	v. El Salvador, 7 March 2026
DF	Angie Tomateo	20 November 2000 (age 25)	0	0	(Peru) Sporting Cristal	v. El Salvador, 7 March 2026
DF	Ima Kellerman	1 January 2006 (age 20)	0	0	(United States) Mount Saint Vincent	v. El Salvador, 7 March 2026
DF	Anabella Kellerman	16 November 2006 (age 20)	1	0	(United States) LA Surf	v. El Salvador, 7 March 2026
DF	Braelynn Llamoca	30 January 2002 (age 24)	19	0	(United States) CA Internacional	v. Venezuela, 2 December 2025
DF	Rosa Castro	27 April 1995 (age 31)	14	0	(Argentina) Huracán	v. Venezuela, 2 December 2025
DF	Taylor Vogt	8 March 2005 (age 21)	1	0	(United States) Florida Atlantic	v. Venezuela, 2 December 2025
DF	Shanda Mamani	13 September 2004 (age 22)	1	0	(Peru) UNSAAC	v. Venezuela, 2 December 2025
DF	Naicha Urbina	26 November 2005 (age 20)	0	0	(Peru) Sporting Cristal	v. Panama, 28 October 2025
MF	Rubi Acosta	9 October 1997 (age 29)	3	0	(Peru) Carlos A. Mannucci	v. El Salvador, 7 March 2026
MF	Alba Soto	8 December 2008 (age 17)	0	0	(Peru) Melgar	v. El Salvador, 7 March 2026
MF	Valentina Quiroz	9 October 1997 (age 29)	0	0	(United States) Glenville State Pioneers	v. El Salvador, 7 March 2026
MF	Nahomi Martínez	April 5, 1997 (age 29)	26	1	(Spain) Collerense	v. Venezuela, 2 December 2025
MF	Geraldine Cisneros	12 March 1996 (age 30)	19	1	(Peru) Universitario	v. Venezuela, 2 December 2025
MF	Cindy Novoa	10 August 1995 (age 31)	11	0	(Peru) Universitario	v. Venezuela, 2 December 2025
MF	Sofia Aguayo	12 January 2007 (age 19)	1	0	(United States) Mississippi State University	v. Panama, 28 October 2025
FW	Paula Holguin	1 October 2000 (age 26)	0	0	(England) Brentford	v. El Salvador, 7 March 2026
FW	Lupita Rodriguez	30 April 2009 (age 17)	1	0	(Peru) Alianza Lima	v. El Salvador, 7 March 2026
FW	Pierina Núñez	13 March 2000 (age 26)	25	5	(Spain) Levante	v. Venezuela, 2 December 2025
FW	Xioczana Canales	21 April 1999 (age 27)	20	1	(Peru) Universitario	v. Venezuela, 2 December 2025
FW	Valerie Gherson	28 December 2005 (age 20)	12	4	(Peru) Universitario	v. Venezuela, 2 December 2025
FW	Alondra Vílchez	16 March 1997 (age 29)	8	1	(Peru) Universitario	v. Venezuela, 2 December 2025
FW	Milena Tomayconsa	28 September 2001 (age 25)	1	0	(Peru) Sporting Cristal	v. Panama, 28 October 2025

=== Captains ===
- Adriana Dávila (????)
- Miryam Tristán (????)
- Fabiola Herrera (????–2025)
- Mía León (2026–)

== Competitive record ==
=== FIFA Women's World Cup ===
FIFA Women's World Cup record
Year	Result	Pld	W	D*	L	GF	GA
(China) 1991	Did not enter						
(Sweden) 1995	Did not enter						
(United States) 1999	Did not qualify						
(United States) 2003	Did not qualify						
(China) 2007	Did not qualify						
(Germany) 2011	Did not qualify						
(Canada) 2015	Did not qualify						
(France) 2019	Did not qualify						
(Australia) (New Zealand) 2023	Did not qualify						
(Brazil) 2027	Did not qualify						
(Costa Rica) (Jamaica) (Mexico) (United States) 2031	To be determined						
(United Kingdom) 2035	To be determined						
Total	–	–	–	–	–	–	–

*Draws include knockout matches decided on penalty kicks

=== CONMEBOL Copa América Femenina ===
CONMEBOL Copa América Femenina record
Year	Result	Pld	W	D*	L	GF	GA
(Brazil) 1991	Did not enter						
(Brazil) 1995	Did not enter						
(Argentina) 1998	Third place	6	3	2	1	9	21
(Peru) (Argentina) (Ecuador) 2003	Fourth place	5	2	1	2	6	7
(Argentina) 2006	Group stage	4	1	0	3	3	7
(Ecuador) 2010	Group stage	4	0	0	4	3	9
(Ecuador) 2014	Group stage	4	0	1	3	1	4
(Chile) 2018	Group stage	4	0	1	3	1	12
(Colombia) 2022	Group stage	4	0	0	4	0	18
(Ecuador) 2025	Group stage	4	0	0	4	1	8
Total	Third place	35	6	5	24	24	86

*Draws include knockout matches decided on penalty kicks.

=== CONMEBOL Liga de Naciones Femenina ===
CONMEBOL Liga de Naciones Femenina record
Year	Result	Pld	W	D	L	GF	GA
2025–26	Fifth place	8	3	2	3	12	15
Total	Fifth place	8	3	2	3	12	15

=== Pan American Games ===
Pan American Games record
Year	Result	Pld	W	D*	L	GF	GA	Squad
(Canada) 1999	Did not enter							
(Dominican Republic) 2003	Did not enter							
(Brazil) 2007	Did not enter							
(Mexico) 2011	Did not qualify							
(Canada) 2015	Did not qualify							
(Peru) 2019	8th place	4	0	1	3	2	8	Squad
(Chile) 2023	Did not qualify							
(Peru) 2027	Qualified as hosts							
(Paraguay) 2031	To be determined							
Total	8th place	4	0	1	3	2	8	–

*Draws include knockout matches decided on penalty kicks.

=== Bolivarian Games ===
Bolivarian Games record
Year	Result	Pld	W	D*	L	GF	GA
(Colombia) 2005	Gold medal	6	6	0	0	19	1
(Bolivia) 2009	Fifth place	4	0	1	3	4	11
Since 2013	U-20 Tournament						
Total	Gold medal	10	6	1	3	23	12

*Draws include knockout matches decided on penalty kicks.

== Honours ==
=== Major competitions ===
- Copa América Femenina
  - (bronze) Third place (1): 1998

=== Regional ===
- Bolivarian Games
  - (gold) Gold Medalists (1): 2005

== See also ==
- Sport in Peru
  - Football in Peru
- Peru men's national football team
- Peruvian Football Federation
- Primera División Femenina

== Notes ==
Achievements
Preceded by Inaugural Champions	Bolivarian Champions; 2005 (First title)	Succeeded by 2009 Colombia
