= Copa América Femenina =

CONMEBOL Copa América Femenina
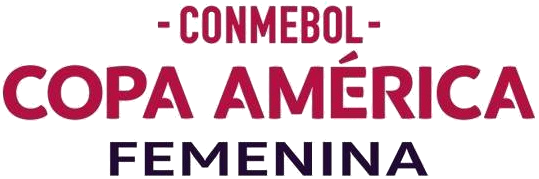
- Organizer(s): CONMEBOL
- Founded: 1991; 34 years ago
- Region: South America
- Teams: 10 (finals)
- Qualifier for: Pan American Games; Summer Olympics; Women's Finalissima
- Related competitions: Copa América
- Current champion: Brazil (9th title)
- Most championships: Brazil (9 titles)
- Website: conmebol.com/cafemenina
- 2025 Copa América Femenina

The Copa América Femenina (Copa América Feminina in Portuguese), previously the Campeonato Sudamericano de Fútbol Femenino (Campeonato Sul-Americano de Futebol Feminino), usually shortened to Sudamericano Femenino (Sul-Americano Feminino), is the main competition in women's association football for national teams that are affiliated with CONMEBOL. It is the women's version of the Copa América.

It was first held in 1991. In the first two editions of the tournament, only one team (the champions) qualified for the FIFA Women's World Cup. In the third edition, the champions qualified automatically, while the runners-up faced a team from the CONCACAF region in a play-off match to earn a spot in the World Cup. In the fourth to sixth editions, two automatic spots were given to the top two teams for the 2003 to 2011 World Cups respectively. The seventh and eighth had the top two and the play-off winners qualify for the 2015 and 2019 World Cups. The ninth edition, the last one to serve as a World Cup qualification, gave automatic slots for the 2023 World Cup to the top three.

In December 2020, CONMEBOL announced the tournament would be held every two years instead of every four years, actually starting with 2025, three years after 2022. The confederation introduced a separate South American qualifier for the Women's World Cup in December 2024. Hence, the Copa America Fémenina from 2025 will serve as the path to women's football at the Pan American Games and as the CONMEBOL women's pre-Olympic tournament.

There are also Under-20 and Under-17 versions of this tournament.

== Results ==
Ed.	Year	Host	First place game			Third place game			Num. teams
Ed.	Year	Host	Champions	Score	Runners-up	Third place	Score	Fourth place	Num. teams
1	1991	Brazil	Brazil	– (Note: Played in a Round-robin format.)	Chile	Venezuela	– (Note: Only three teams participated.)	–	3
2	1995	Brazil	Brazil	2–0	Argentina	Chile	–	Ecuador	5
3	1998	Argentina	Brazil	7–1	Argentina	Peru	3–3 (a.e.t.) (5–4 p)	Ecuador	10
4	2003	Peru; Argentina; Ecuador	Brazil	–	Argentina	Colombia	–	Peru	10
5	2006	Argentina	Argentina	–	Brazil	Uruguay	–	Paraguay	10
6	2010	Ecuador	Brazil	–	Colombia	Chile	–	Argentina	10
7	2014	Ecuador	Brazil	–	Colombia	Ecuador	–	Argentina	10
8	2018	Chile	Brazil	–	Chile	Argentina	–	Colombia	10
9	2022	Colombia	Brazil	1–0	Colombia	Argentina	3–1	Paraguay	10
10	2025	Ecuador	Brazil	4–4 (a.e.t.) (5–4 p)	Colombia	Argentina	2–2 (5–4 p)	Uruguay	10

== Top four classifications ==
So far, only Bolivia has not yet reached a top four position in the tournament.

Team	Titles	Runners-up	Third place	Fourth place	Total top four
Brazil	9 (1991, 1995, 1998, 2003, 2010, 2014, 2018, 2022, 2025)	1 (2006)	–	–	10
Argentina	1 (2006)	3 (1995, 1998, 2003)	3 (2018, 2022, 2025)	2 (2010, 2014)	9
Colombia	–	4 (2010, 2014, 2022, 2025)	1 (2003)	1 (2018)	6
Chile	–	2 (1991, 2018)	2 (1995, 2010)	–	4
Ecuador	–	–	1 (2014)	2 (1995, 1998)	3
Peru	–	–	1 (1998)	1 (2003)	2
Uruguay	–	–	1 (2006)	1 (2025)	2
Venezuela	–	–	1 (1991)	–	1
Paraguay	–	–	–	2 (2006, 2022)	2

== Summary ==
Rank	Team	Part	M	W	D	L	GF	GA	GD	Points
1	Brazil	9	50	47	1	2	268	18	+250	142
2	Argentina	8	50	30	5	15	120	64	+56	95
3	Colombia	7	40	22	7	11	89	65	+24	73
4	Chile	9	39	14	7	18	69	77	−8	49
5	Paraguay	7	31	15	2	14	61	64	−3	47
6	Ecuador	8	35	12	5	18	57	87	−30	41
7	Venezuela	8	29	7	3	19	28	85	−57	24
8	Peru	7	31	6	5	20	23	78	−55	23
9	Uruguay	7	29	6	3	20	29	83	−54	21
10	Bolivia	8	30	3	2	25	27	150	−123	11

== Participating nations ==
Legend

- 1st – Champions
- 2nd – Runners-up
- 3rd – Third place
- 4th – Fourth place
- 5th – Fifth place
- 6th – Sixth place
- 7th – Seventh place
- 8th – Eighth place
- 9th – Ninth place
- 10th – Tenth place
- Q – Qualified
- — Did Not Participate
- — Hosts

Team	(Brazil) 1991 (3)	(Brazil) 1995 (5)	(Argentina) 1998 (10)	(Peru) (Argentina) (Ecuador) 2003 (10)	(Argentina) 2006 (10)	(Ecuador) 2010 (10)	(Ecuador) 2014 (10)	(Chile) 2018 (10)	(Colombia) 2022 (10)	(Ecuador) 2025 (10)	Total
Argentina	—	2nd	2nd	2nd	1st	4th	4th	3rd	3rd	3rd	9
Bolivia	—	5th	9th	6th	10th	7th	10th	7th	9th	10th	9
Brazil	1st	1st	1st	1st	2nd	1st	1st	1st	1st	1st	10
Chile	2nd	3rd	7th	8th	9th	3rd	6th	2nd	5th	6th	10
Colombia	—	—	6th	3rd	7th	2nd	2nd	4th	2nd	2nd	8
Ecuador	—	4th	4th	5th	5th	5th	3rd	10th	7th	8th	9
Paraguay	—	—	5th	7th	4th	6th	5th	5th	4th	5th	8
Peru	—	—	3rd	4th	8th	9th	9th	9th	10th	9th	8
Uruguay	—	—	8th	9th	3rd	10th	7th	8th	8th	4th	8
Venezuela	3rd	—	10th	10th	6th	8th	8th	6th	6th	7th	9

== Top scorers ==
Year	Player	Team	Goals	Matches
1991	Adriana	Brazil	4	2
1995	Sissi	Brazil	12	4
1998	Roseli	Brazil	16	6
2003	Marisol Medina	Argentina	7	5
2006	Cristiane	Brazil	12	7
2010	Marta	Brazil	9	7
2014	Cristiane	Brazil	6	7
2018	Catalina Usme	Colombia	9	7
2022	Yamila Rodríguez	Argentina	6	6
2025	Amanda Gutierres; Claudia Martínez	Brazil; Paraguay	6	6
