= 2016 Copa Libertadores Femenina =

2016 Copa Libertadores de América Femenina

Tournament details
- Host country: Uruguay
- Dates: 6–20 December 2016
- Teams: 12 (from 10 associations)
- Venues: 2 (in 2 host cities)

Final positions
- Champions: (Paraguay) Sportivo Limpeño (1st title)
- Runners-up: (Venezuela) Estudiantes de Guárico
- Third place: (Brazil) Foz Cataratas
- Fourth place: (Uruguay) Colón

Tournament statistics
- Matches played: 22
- Goals scored: 63 (2.86 per match)
- Top scorer(s): (Venezuela) Oriana Altuve (Colombia) Manuela González (4 goals each)

The 2016 Copa Libertadores Femenina was the eighth edition of the Copa Libertadores Femenina, South America's premier women's club football tournament organized by CONMEBOL. The tournament was played in Uruguay from 6 to 20 December 2016.

In the first final without a team from Brazil, Paraguayan team Sportivo Limpeño won their first title against Estudiantes de Guárico from Venezuela.

== Teams ==
The competition was contested by 12 teams: the champions of all ten CONMEBOL associations were given one entry, additionally the title holders re-entered and the host association qualified one more team. The qualifying competitions of each association usually end late in the year (September to December). The Colombian tournament finished last, in fact only a week after the final draw was made. With Generaciones Palmiranas qualifying from Colombia it was the first time the Copa Libertadores was held without Formas Íntimas, who were the only team from Colombia to have played in all previous editions.

Association	Team	Qualifying method	Participation	Best result
Argentina	UAI Urquiza	2016 Campeonato Argentino champions	2nd	3rd place (2015)
Bolivia	San Martín de Porres	2016 Campeonato Boliviano champions	2nd	Group stage (2015)
Brazil	Ferroviária	Title holder (2015 champions)	2nd	Champions (2015)
Brazil	Foz Cataratas	2015 Copa do Brasil de Futebol Feminino third place (Note: The 2015 Copa do Brasil de Futebol Feminino champions should have qualified for the Copa Libertadores. However, the champions Kindermann folded, and the runners-up Ferroviária already qualified as title holders. The Brazilian Football Confederation offered the Copa Libertadores berth to the third place Foz Cataratas, instead of the 2015 Campeonato Brasileiro de Futebol Feminino champions, Rio Preto.)	3rd	Runners-up (2012)
Chile	Colo-Colo	2015 Apertura and Clausura champions play-off winners	6th	Champions (2012)
Colombia	Generaciones Palmiranas	2016 Campeonato Nacional Interclubes winners	1st	—
Ecuador	Unión Española	2015 Campeonato Ecuatoriano champions	1st	—
Paraguay	Sportivo Limpeño	2015 Campeonato Paraguayo champions	1st	—
Peru	Universitario	2015 Campeonato Nacional de Fútbol Femenino champions	2nd	Group stage (2015)
Uruguay	Colón	2015 Copa de Oro winners	3rd	Group stage (2014, 2015)
Uruguay	Nacional	2015 Copa de Oro runners-up	4th	Group stage (2011, 2012, 2013)
Venezuela	Estudiantes de Guárico	2016 Apertura winners	3rd	Group stage (2013, 2015)

== Venues ==
Stadia locations

Matches were played in the Estadio Charrúa in Montevideo and the Estadio Profesor Alberto Suppici in Colonia del Sacramento.

== Match officials ==
One referee plus two assistant referees were announced from every association to officiate the matches.

== Format ==
There were no format changes to the previous seasons. The teams were drawn into three groups of four, where each group was played on a round-robin basis. The winners of each group and the best runners-up advanced to the semifinals, which were played on a single-elimination basis, with the following matchups:

- Group A winners vs. Group B winners
- Group C winners vs. Best runners-up

The semifinal winners and losers play in the final and third place match respectively.

== Draw ==
The draw of the tournament was held on 16 November 2016, 19:30 UTC−3, at the headquarters of the Uruguayan Football Association. The 12 teams were drawn into three groups of four containing one team from each of the four seeding pots. The host teams Colon and Nacional and the title holder Ferroviaria were seeded to Group A, B and C respectively. The other teams were seeded based on the results of their association in the 2015 Copa Libertadores Femenina.

Pot 1	Pot 2	Pot 3	Pot 4
(Uruguay) Colón; (Uruguay) Nacional; (Brazil) Ferroviária	(Brazil) Foz Cataratas; (Chile) Colo-Colo; (Argentina) UAI Urquiza	Colombia 1 (Note: The draw was held before the identity of the team from Colombia (Generaciones Palmiranas) was known.); (Venezuela) Estudiantes de Guárico; (Paraguay) Sportivo Limpeño	(Bolivia) San Martín de Porres; (Ecuador) Unión Española; (Peru) Universitario

== Group stage ==
The teams are ranked according to points (3 points for a win, 1 point for a draw, 0 points for a loss). If tied on points, tiebreakers would be applied in the following order (Regulations Article 17.1):

1. Goal difference in all games;
2. Goals scored in all games;
3. Head-to-head result in games between tied teams;
4. Penalty shoot-out if two teams tied having playing last game against each other;
5. Drawing of lots.

All times UYT (UTC−3).

=== Group A ===
Colón advanced to the knock-out stage as best runners-up. It was the first time in the competition history that a team from Uruguay advanced from the group stage.

Pos	Team	Pld	W	D	L	GF	GA	GD	Pts	Qualification
1	(Paraguay) Sportivo Limpeño	3	2	1	0	7	2	+5	7	Knockout stage
2	(Uruguay) Colón (H)	3	2	0	1	8	4	+4	6	Knockout stage
3	(Argentina) UAI Urquiza	3	1	1	1	3	2	+1	4	
4	(Peru) Universitario	3	0	0	3	0	10	−10	0	

Source: CONMEBOL
(H) Hosts
6 December 2016
15:00

Sportivo Limpeño (Paraguay)	4–0	(Peru) Universitario
Peña 5', 56'; Aquino 10'; Agüero 42'	Report

Estadio Charrúa, Montevideo
Referee: Susana Corella (Ecuador)
6 December 2016
17:30

Colón (Uruguay)	2–1	(Argentina) UAI Urquiza
Badell 56'; Altuve 66' (pen.)	Report	Muñoz 38'

Estadio Charrúa, Montevideo
Referee: Edina Alves Batista (Brazil)

9 December 2016
15:00

UAI Urquiza (Argentina)	2–0	(Peru) Universitario
Bonsegundo 45'; Potassa 69'	Report

Estadio Charrúa, Montevideo
Referee: Sirley Cornejo (Bolivia)
9 December 2016
17:30

Colón (Uruguay)	2–3	(Paraguay) Sportivo Limpeño
Altuve 21'; Badell 26'	Report	Garay López 14' (pen.); Larrea 63'; C. Benítez 72'

Estadio Charrúa, Montevideo
Referee: Paola Barría (Chile)

12 December 2016
15:00

UAI Urquiza (Argentina)	0–0	(Paraguay) Sportivo Limpeño
	Report

Estadio Charrúa, Montevideo
Referee: María Victoria Daza (Colombia)
12 December 2016
17:30

Colón (Uruguay)	4–0	(Peru) Universitario
Altuve 31' (pen.), 89'; Suárez 60'; Badell 64'	Report

Estadio Charrúa, Montevideo
Referee: Edina Alves Batista (Brazil)

=== Group B ===
Pos	Team	Pld	W	D	L	GF	GA	GD	Pts	Qualification
1	(Brazil) Foz Cataratas	3	3	0	0	8	2	+6	9	Knockout stage
2	(Colombia) Generaciones Palmiranas	3	1	1	1	8	3	+5	4	
3	(Bolivia) San Martín de Porres	3	1	1	1	5	5	0	4	
4	(Uruguay) Nacional (H)	3	0	0	3	2	13	−11	0	

Source: CONMEBOL
(H) Hosts
7 December 2016
15:00

Generaciones Palmiranas (Colombia)	1–1	(Bolivia) San Martín de Porres
González 89'	Report	O. Sandoval 21'

Estadio Charrúa, Montevideo
Referee: Estela Álvarez (Argentina)
7 December 2016
17:30

Nacional (Uruguay)	1–3	(Brazil) Foz Cataratas
Silvera 72' (pen.)	Report	Camila Germano 5'; Riveros 79' (pen.); Dany Helena 90+1'

Estadio Charrúa, Montevideo
Referee: Eyerlitz Escalona (Venezuela)

10 December 2016
15:00

Foz Cataratas (Brazil)	3–1	(Bolivia) San Martín de Porres
Dany Helena 40'; Riveros 54'; Gi Santos 80'	Report	López 58'

Estadio Charrúa, Montevideo
Referee: Nadia Fuques (Uruguay)
10 December 2016
17:30

Nacional (Uruguay)	0–7	(Colombia) Generaciones Palmiranas
	Report	González 60', 79', 90+3'; Santos 61' (pen.), 66', 86'; Vidal 71'

Estadio Charrúa, Montevideo
Referee: Elizabeth Tintaya (Peru)

13 December 2016
15:00

Foz Cataratas (Brazil)	2–0	(Colombia) Generaciones Palmiranas
Dany Helena 26'; Riveros 81' (pen.)	Report

Estadio Charrúa, Montevideo
Referee: Paola Barría (Chile)
13 December 2016
17:30

Nacional (Uruguay)	1–3	(Bolivia) San Martín de Porres
Silveira 49'	Report	Gómez 18'; López 28'; Cruz 73'

Estadio Charrúa, Montevideo
Referee: Eyerlitz Escalona (Venezuela)

=== Group C ===
Both last year's finalists Ferroviária and Colo-Colo met in Group C. Both failed to advance as Estudiantes de Guárico won the group with just 2 goals scored.

Pos	Team	Pld	W	D	L	GF	GA	GD	Pts	Qualification
1	(Venezuela) Estudiantes de Guárico	3	2	1	0	2	0	+2	7	Knockout stage
2	(Chile) Colo-Colo	3	1	2	0	4	3	+1	5	
3	(Brazil) Ferroviária	3	1	1	1	6	3	+3	4	
4	(Ecuador) Unión Española	3	0	0	3	3	9	−6	0	

Source: CONMEBOL
8 December 2016
17:30

Estudiantes de Guárico (Venezuela)	1–0	(Ecuador) Unión Española
Viso 54'	Report

Estadio Profesor Alberto Suppici, Colonia del Sacramento
Referee: María Victoria Daza (Colombia)
8 December 2016
20:00

Ferroviária (Brazil)	1–1	(Chile) Colo-Colo
Julia Bianchi 7'	Report	Araya 71' (pen.)

Estadio Profesor Alberto Suppici, Colonia del Sacramento
Referee: Zulma Quiñónez (Paraguay)

11 December 2016
17:30

Colo-Colo (Chile)	3–2	(Ecuador) Unión Española
Araya 44' (pen.); Huenteo 61'; Lara 70'	Report	Rodríguez 58' (pen.); Abraham 78'

Estadio Profesor Alberto Suppici, Colonia del Sacramento
Referee: Estela Álvarez (Argentina)
11 December 2016
20:00

Ferroviária (Brazil)	0–1	(Venezuela) Estudiantes de Guárico
	Report	Viso 82'

Estadio Profesor Alberto Suppici, Colonia del Sacramento
Referee: Sirley Cornejo (Bolivia)

14 December 2016
17:30

Colo-Colo (Chile)	0–0	(Venezuela) Estudiantes de Guárico
	Report

Estadio Profesor Alberto Suppici, Colonia del Sacramento
Referee: Zulma Quiñónez (Paraguay)
14 December 2016
20:00

Ferroviária (Brazil)	5–1	(Ecuador) Unión Española
Carol Pretona 8', 17'; Raquel 54'; Daiane 60' (pen.); Patrícia Llanos 67'	Report	Espinoza 27'

Estadio Profesor Alberto Suppici, Colonia del Sacramento
Referee: Nadia Fuques (Uruguay)

=== Ranking of second-placed teams ===
Colón already secured best runner-up spot.

Pos	Grp	Team	Pld	W	D	L	GF	GA	GD	Pts	Qualification
1	A	(Uruguay) Colón	3	2	0	1	8	4	+4	6	Knockout stage
2	C	(Chile) Colo-Colo	3	1	2	0	4	3	+1	5	
3	B	(Colombia) Generaciones Palmiranas	3	1	1	1	8	3	+5	4	

Source: CONMEBOL
Rules for classification: 1) points; 2) goal difference; 3) goals scored; 4) drawing of lots.

== Knockout stage ==
If tied after regulation time, extra time would not be played, and the penalty shoot-out would be used to determine the winner (Regulations Article 17.4).

=== Bracket ===
For the first time no team from Brazil reached the final.

Semi-finals
17 December
(Paraguay) Sportivo Limpeño	2
(Brazil) Foz Cataratas	0
17 December
(Venezuela) Estudiantes de Guárico	2
(Uruguay) Colón	0

Final
20 December
(Paraguay) Sportivo Limpeño	2
(Venezuela) Estudiantes de Guárico	1
Third place
20 December
(Brazil) Foz Cataratas (p)	0 (3)
(Uruguay) Colón	0 (1)

=== Semifinals ===
17 December 2016
18:30

Sportivo Limpeño (Paraguay)	2–0	(Brazil) Foz Cataratas
Aquino 34'; Agüero 63'	Report

Estadio Profesor Alberto Suppici, Colonia del Sacramento
Referee: Estela Álvarez (Argentina)

17 December 2016
20:45

Estudiantes de Guárico (Venezuela)	2–0	(Uruguay) Colón
Mendoza 12'; Guarecuco 76'	Report

Estadio Profesor Alberto Suppici, Colonia del Sacramento
Referee: Susana Corella (Ecuador)

=== Third place match ===
20 December 2016
18:30

Foz Cataratas (Brazil)	0–0	(Uruguay) Colón
	Report
Penalties
Riveros (penalty scored); Maressa (penalty missed); Rafinha (penalty scored); Dany Helena (penalty scored)	3–1	(penalty missed) Suárez; (penalty missed) Domeniguini; (penalty missed) Badell; (penalty scored) Pion

Estadio Profesor Alberto Suppici, Colonia del Sacramento
Referee: Elizabeth Tintaya (Peru)

=== Final ===
20 December 2016
20:45

Sportivo Limpeño (Paraguay)	2–1	(Venezuela) Estudiantes de Guárico
Peña 71'; Cortaza 89'	Report	Pao. Villamizar 46'

Estadio Profesor Alberto Suppici, Colonia del Sacramento
Referee: Paola Barría (Chile)

Sportivo Limpeño	Estudiantes de Guárico

GK	1	(Trinidad and Tobago) Kimika Forbes
DF	2	(Paraguay) Laurie Cristaldo	(yellow card) 85'
DF	3	(Uruguay) Stephanie Lacoste (c)
DF	5	(Paraguay) Carmen Benítez
DF	6	(Paraguay) Damia Cortaza
MF	7	(Paraguay) Joana Galeano
MF	10	(Paraguay) Rosa Aquino
MF	18	(Paraguay) Griselda Garay López	(yellow card) 80'	(substituted off) 80'
MF	19	(Paraguay) Marta Agüero
FW	13	(Paraguay) Jessica Martínez
FW	11	(Paraguay) Liz Peña		(substituted off) 90+1'
Substitutes:
GK	12	(Paraguay) Alicia Bobadilla
GK	20	(Paraguay) Natasha Martínez
DF	4	(Paraguay) Natalia Genes
DF	15	(Paraguay) Belén Benítez
DF	16	(Paraguay) Sady Salinas
MF	8	(Paraguay) Silvia Getto
MF	14	(Paraguay) Dulce Quintana		(substituted on) 90+1'
FW	9	(Paraguay) Liza Larrea		(substituted on) 80'
FW	17	(Paraguay) María Claudia Romero
Manager:
(Paraguay) Rubén Subeldía

GK	13	(Venezuela) Lisbeth Castro
DF	8	(Venezuela) Nairelis Gutiérrez
DF	4	(Venezuela) Sandra Luzardo
DF	3	(Venezuela) Yaribeth Ulacio (c)
DF	7	(Venezuela) Milagros Mendoza
MF	20	(Argentina) Vanesa Santana		(substituted off) 54'
MF	17	(Venezuela) Maikerlin Astudillo	(yellow card) 20' (yellow-red card) 64'
MF	11	(Venezuela) Joemar Guarecuco
MF	9	(Venezuela) Cinthia Zarabia	(yellow card) 81'
FW	18	(Venezuela) Ysaura Viso
FW	10	(Venezuela) Paola Villamizar
Substitutes:
GK	1	(Venezuela) Mariana Rojas
GK	12	(Venezuela) Yolgrelis Rengifo
DF	6	(Venezuela) Anaurys Gómez
DF	15	(Venezuela) Lisol Castillo
DF	16	(Venezuela) Elianny Salina
DF	19	(Venezuela) Pamela Villamizar
MF	5	(Venezuela) Dayana Rodríguez	(yellow card) 57'	(substituted on) 54'
MF	14	(Venezuela) Domiesgli Peña
FW	2	(Venezuela) Yuliana Cortez
Manager:
(Venezuela) Omar Ramírez

== Top goalscorers ==
Rank	Player	Team	Goals
1	(Venezuela) Oriana Altuve	(Uruguay) Colón	4
1	(Colombia) Manuela González	(Colombia) Generaciones Palmiranas	4
3	(Uruguay) Yamila Badell	(Uruguay) Colón	3
3	(Brazil) Dany Helena	(Brazil) Foz Cataratas	3
3	(Paraguay) Liz Peña	(Paraguay) Sportivo Limpeño	3
3	(Paraguay) Verónica Riveros	(Brazil) Foz Cataratas	3
3	(Colombia) Leicy Santos	(Colombia) Generaciones Palmiranas	3
8	(Paraguay) Marta Agüero	(Paraguay) Sportivo Limpeño	2
8	(Paraguay) Rosa Aquino	(Paraguay) Sportivo Limpeño	2
8	(Chile) Karen Araya	(Chile) Colo-Colo	2
8	(Brazil) Carol Pretona	(Brazil) Ferroviária	2
8	(Argentina) Yanina López	(Bolivia) San Martín de Porres	2
8	(Venezuela) Ysaura Viso	(Venezuela) Estudiantes de Guárico	2

== Prize money ==
Each participating team received US$10,000, with prize money given to the top four teams.

Rank	US$
1st	30,000
2nd	20,000
3rd	15,000
4th	10,000
