= 2014 Copa Libertadores Femenina =

Tournament details
- Host country: Brazil
- City: São José dos Campos
- Dates: 5–16 November
- Teams: 12 (from 10 associations)
- Venues: 3 (in 1 host city)

Final positions
- Champions: (Brazil) São José (3rd title)
- Runners-up: (Venezuela) Caracas
- Third place: (Paraguay) Cerro Porteño
- Fourth place: (Colombia) Formas Íntimas

Tournament statistics
- Matches played: 22
- Goals scored: 97 (4.41 per match)
- Top scorer(s): (Brazil) Andressa Alves (Colombia) Diana Ospina (Venezuela) Ysaura Viso (6 goals each)

The 2014 Copa Libertadores Femenina was the sixth edition of the Copa Libertadores Femenina, South America's premier women's international club football tournament organized by CONMEBOL. The tournament was held in the city of São José dos Campos, in the São Paulo state of Brazil, from 5 to 16 November 2014.

Hometown team São José were the defending champions and defended their title by beating Caracas FC in the final. It was the third title for the team which thus became the record champion of the competition.

The topscorer award was shared by three players with six goals: Andressa Alves, Diana Ospina and Ysaura Viso, who won the award for a second time.

== Qualified teams ==
The competition was contested by twelve teams: the title holder, the champion club from each of the ten CONMEBOL associations, and one additional team from the host country Brazil.

Associations had to confirm team participation until 18 October and submit a player list until 25 October.

Association	Team	Qualifying method
Argentina	Boca Juniors	2014 Torneo Initial and Torneo Final play-off winner
Bolivia	Mundo Futuro	2014 Campeonato Boliviano champion
Brazil	São José	Title holder (2013 champion)
Brazil	Vitória das Tabocas	2013 Copa do Brasil runner-up (as São José won cup)
Brazil	Centro Olímpico	2013 Campeonato Brasileiro champion
Chile	Colo Colo	2013 Torneo Apertura and Torneo Clausura champion
Colombia	Formas Íntimas	2014 Copa Prelibertadores winner
Ecuador	Rocafuerte	2014 Campeonato Ecuatoriano champion
Paraguay	Cerro Porteño	2013 Campeonato Paraguayo champion
Peru	Real Maracaná	2013 Campeonato Nacional de Fútbol Femenino champion
Uruguay	Colón	2013 Campeonato Uruguayo champion
Venezuela	Caracas	2014 Campeonato Venezolano champion

== Format ==
Same format as last year is used:

- The twelve teams are divided into three groups of four.
- The group winners and the best runner-up advance to the semifinals.
- The semifinals matchups are:
  - Group B winner vs. Best runner-up
  - Group C winner vs. Group A winner
- The semifinal winners and losers play in the final and third place match respectively.

== Referees ==
One referee and one assistant is sent from every CONMEBOL member association.

== Prize money ==
Each association gets US$5,000 from CONMEBOL. Additionally there are prizes for associations of the top four teams. $5,000 for fourth, $10,000 for third, $15,000 for second and $20,000 for the champion's association.

== Venues ==
Three venues are used: Estádio Martins Pereira (Group A, semi-finals, third place match and final), Estádio ADC GM (Group B), and Estádio ADC Parahyba (Group C). All matches had free entry to the public.

== Group stage ==
The schedule was announced by CONMEBOL on 29 October 2014.

If teams finish level on points, order will be determined according to the following criteria:

1. superior goal difference in all matches
2. greater number of goals scored in all group matches
3. better result in matches between tied teams
4. drawing of lots

All times local, Brasília Summer Time (UTC−2).

=== Group A ===
Team	Pld	W	D	L	GF	GA	GD	Pts
(Brazil) São José	3	3	0	0	16	1	+15	9
(Argentina) Boca Juniors	3	2	0	1	7	7	0	6
(Peru) Real Maracaná	3	1	0	2	4	13	−9	3
(Bolivia) Mundo Futuro	3	0	0	3	3	9	−6	0

5 November 2014
16:00

Boca Juniors (Argentina)	2–1	(Bolivia) Mundo Futuro
Oviedo 40'; Ojeda 67'	Report	Luciel Pérez Galarza 60'

Estádio Martins Pereira, São José dos Campos
Referee: Yercinia Correa (Venezuela)
5 November 2014
19:30

São José (Brazil)	7–0	(Peru) Real Maracaná
Poliana 15'; Andressa Alves 19', 25', 46'; Chú Santos 26', 37'; Bruna Benites 62'	Report

Estádio Martins Pereira, São José dos Campos
Referee: María Victoria Daza (Colombia)

7 November 2014
17:30

Mundo Futuro (Bolivia)	2–3	(Peru) Real Maracaná
Yanina López 41'; Yaneth Viveros Campos 59'	Report	Astrid Ramírez Paz 64' (pen.), 66'; Adriana Lúcar Carrasco 87'

Estádio Martins Pereira, São José dos Campos
Referee: Nadia Fuques (Uruguay)
7 November 2014
20:00

São José (Brazil)	5–1	(Argentina) Boca Juniors
Giovânia 20', 63'; Andressa Alves 38', 41'; Debinha 75'	Report	Daniela Kippes 17'

Estádio Martins Pereira, São José dos Campos
Referee: Olga Miranda (Paraguay)

9 November 2014
17:30

Real Maracaná (Peru)	1–4	(Argentina) Boca Juniors
Meissi Quiche Pau 51'	Report	Stábile 8', 81'; Oviedo 36', 90+1'

Estádio Martins Pereira, São José dos Campos
9 November 2014
20:00

São José (Brazil)	4–0	(Bolivia) Mundo Futuro
Formiga 72'; Gislaine 85'; Poliana 87'; Giovânia 90'	Report

Estádio Martins Pereira, São José dos Campos

=== Group B ===
Team	Pld	W	D	L	GF	GA	GD	Pts
(Venezuela) Caracas	3	2	1	0	9	7	+2	7
(Brazil) Centro Olímpico	3	1	2	0	7	3	+4	5
(Chile) Colo Colo	3	1	1	1	11	6	+5	4
(Uruguay) Colón	3	0	0	3	5	16	−11	0

6 November 2014
14:30

Caracas (Venezuela)	3–2	(Chile) Colo Colo
Bandrés 67'; Viso 68', 90+4'	Report	Quezada 41'; Roa 61'

Estádio ADC GM, São José dos Campos
Referee: Florencia Romano (Argentina)
6 November 2014
16:30

Centro Olímpico (Brazil)	4–0	(Uruguay) Colón
Tamires 41'; Fabiana Baiana 47'; Gabi Zanotti 49', 51'	Report

Estádio ADC GM, São José dos Campos
Referee: Johana Haro (Ecuador)

8 November 2014
14:30

Centro Olímpico (Brazil)	2–2	(Venezuela) Caracas
Tamires 25'; Érika 45+4'	Report	Altuve 22'; Castro 75'

Estádio ADC GM, São José dos Campos
Referee: Melany Bermejo (Peru)
8 November 2014
16:30

Colo Colo (Chile)	8–2	(Uruguay) Colón
Roa 50'; Banini 55', 64', 66'; C. Soto 69'; Ascanio 74'; Lara 87' (pen.); Aedo 90+1'	Report	González 51'; Badell 84'

Estádio ADC GM, São José dos Campos
Referee: María Victoria Daza (Colombia)

10 November 2014
14:30

Colón (Uruguay)	3–4	(Venezuela) Caracas
Badell 24', 59', 70'	Report	Viso 18', 20', 26'; Villamizar 54'

Estádio ADC GM, São José dos Campos
Referee: Sirley Cornejo (Bolivia)
10 November 2014
16:30

Centro Olímpico (Brazil)	1–1	(Chile) Colo Colo
Gabi Nunes 71'	Report	Banini 62'

Estádio ADC GM, São José dos Campos
Referee: Olga Miranda (Paraguay)

=== Group C ===
Formas Íntimas advanced as best runners-up.

Team	Pld	W	D	L	GF	GA	GD	Pts
(Paraguay) Cerro Porteño	3	3	0	0	10	2	+8	9
(Colombia) Formas Íntimas	3	2	0	1	7	2	+5	6
(Brazil) Vitória das Tabocas	3	1	0	2	5	6	−1	3
(Ecuador) Rocafuerte	3	0	0	3	0	12	−12	0

6 November 2014
09:00

Vitória das Tabocas (Brazil)	4–0	(Ecuador) Rocafuerte
Duda 24'; Cida 37'; Giovanna 39', 56'	Report

Estádio ADC Parahyba, São José dos Campos
Referee: Sirley Cornejo (Bolivia)
6 November 2014
11:00

Cerro Porteño (Paraguay)	2–1	(Colombia) Formas Íntimas
Aquino 6'; Ortiz 32'	Report	Ospina 86'

Estádio ADC Parahyba, São José dos Campos
Referee: Simone Xavier (Brazil)

8 November 2014
09:00

Vitória das Tabocas (Brazil)	1–3	(Paraguay) Cerro Porteño
Byanca Brasil 18'	Report	Fleitas 16'; Aquino 62', 90+3'

Estádio ADC Parahyba, São José dos Campos
Referee: Yercinia Correa (Venezuela)
8 November 2014
11:00

Formas Íntimas (Colombia)	3–0	(Ecuador) Rocafuerte
Valentina Restrepo 18'; Ospina 30', 85'	Report

Estádio ADC Parahyba, São José dos Campos
Referee: Paola Barria (Chile)

10 November 2014
09:00

Rocafuerte (Ecuador)	0–5	(Paraguay) Cerro Porteño
	Report	Mora 1', 35'; Aquino 10'; Fleitas 52'; Fernández 77'

Estádio ADC Parahyba, São José dos Campos
Referee: Melany Bermejo (Peru)
10 November 2014
11:00

Vitória das Tabocas (Brazil)	0–3	(Colombia) Formas Íntimas
	Report	Cuesta 12'; Ospina 23', 71'

Estádio ADC Parahyba, São José dos Campos
Referee: Florencia Romano (Argentina)

== Knockout stage ==
If tied after regulation time, the penalty shoot-out is used to determine the winner (no extra time is played).

Semi-finals
13 November 2014
(Venezuela) Caracas (p)	2 (6)
(Colombia) Formas Íntimas	2 (5)
13 November 2014
(Paraguay) Cerro Porteño	1
(Brazil) São José	2

Final
16 November 2014
(Venezuela) Caracas	1
(Brazil) São José	5
Third place
16 November 2014
(Colombia) Formas Íntimas	0 (3)
(Paraguay) Cerro Porteño (p)	0 (5)

=== Semifinals ===
13 November 2014
17:00

Caracas (Venezuela)	2–2	(Colombia) Formas Íntimas
Castro 16', 90+3'	Report	Ospina 49'; Geraldine Cardona 54'
Penalties
Villamizar (penalty scored); Viso (penalty scored); Daicelis Guzmán (penalty scored); Altuve (penalty scored); Oli Padrón (penalty missed); Bandrés (penalty scored); A. Guzmán (penalty scored)	6–5	(penalty scored) Sepúlveda; (penalty scored) Montoya; (penalty scored) Katherine García; (penalty missed) Paula Andrea Botero; (penalty scored) Geraldine Cardona; (penalty scored) Ospina; (penalty missed) Peduzine

Estádio Martins Pereira, São José dos Campos
Referee: Nadia Fuques (Uruguay)

13 November 2014
19:30

Cerro Porteño (Paraguay)	1–2	(Brazil) São José
Peña 62'	Report	Formiga 67'; Rosana 79'

Estádio Martins Pereira, São José dos Campos
Referee: Sirley Cornejo (Bolivia)

=== Third place match ===
16 November 2014
09:00

Formas Íntimas (Colombia)	0–0	(Paraguay) Cerro Porteño
	Report
Penalties
Kelis Peduzine (penalty scored); Juliana Maria Sierra Ruiz (penalty missed); Dora Alejandra Grisales Bastidas (penalty scored); Viviana Cardona Valencia (penalty scored)	3–5	(penalty scored) Mora; (penalty scored) Vázquez; (penalty scored) Aquino; (penalty scored) Godoy; (penalty scored) Agüero

Estádio Martins Pereira, São José dos Campos

=== Final ===
For the first time a team from Venezuela played in the final. For São José it was their third title in their third final.

16 November 2014
11:00

Caracas (Venezuela)	1–5	(Brazil) São José
Viso 59'	Report	Formiga 8'; Poliana 16', 70'; Andressa Alves 61'; Giovânia 76'

Estádio Martins Pereira, São José dos Campos
Referee: Melany Bermejo (Peru)

== Top goalscorers ==
Rank	Player	Team	Goals
1	(Brazil) Andressa Alves	(Brazil) São José	6
1	(Colombia) Diana Ospina	(Colombia) Formas Íntimas	6
1	(Venezuela) Ysaura Viso	(Venezuela) Caracas	6
4	(Paraguay) Rosa Aquino	(Paraguay) Cerro Porteño	4
4	(Uruguay) Yamila Badell	(Uruguay) Colón	4
4	(Argentina) Estefanía Banini	(Chile) Colo Colo	4
4	(Brazil) Giovânia	(Brazil) São José	4
4	(Brazil) Poliana	(Brazil) São José	4
9	(Venezuela) Lisbeth Castro	(Venezuela) Caracas	3
9	(Brazil) Formiga	(Brazil) São José	3
9	(Argentina) Yael Oviedo	(Argentina) Boca Juniors	3
