= Kimika Forbes =

Tobagonian footballer

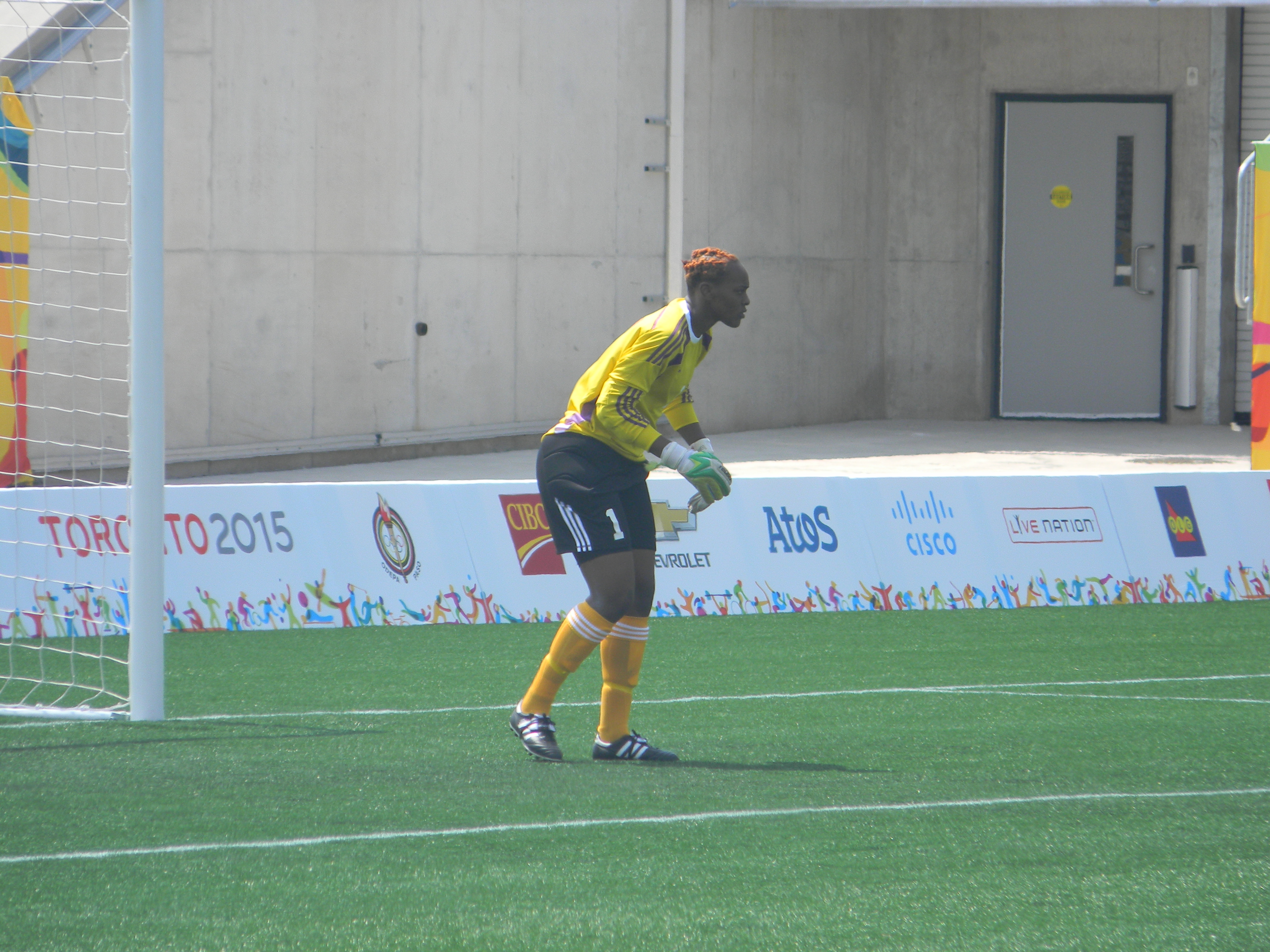
- Forbes 2015

Personal information
- Full name: Kimika Sanell Forbes
- Date of birth: 26 August 1990 (age 36)
- Place of birth: Plymouth, Trinidad and Tobago
- Position: Goalkeeper

Team information
- Current team: Millonarios
- Number: 1

College career
| Years | Team | Apps | (Gls) |
| 2011–2012 | Monroe Community College | | |
| 2013–2014 | University of Maine Fort Kent | | |

Senior career*
| Years | Team | Apps | (Gls) |
| 2014 | Boston Breakers | | |
| 2014–2016 | Wave FC | | |
| –2016 | Ulindi | | |
| 2016 | Sportivo Limpeño | | |
| 2017–2018 | Santa Fe | | |
| 2019– | Millonarios | | |

International career^{‡}
| 2006– | Trinidad and Tobago | 59+ | (0) |
- * Club domestic league appearances and goals ‡ National team caps and goals as of 28 October 2025

Kimika Sanell Forbes (born 26 August 1990) is a Tobagonian footballer who plays as a goalkeeper for Colombian club Millonarios and the Trinidad and Tobago women's national team, which she represents since 2006.

Forbes played for Paraguayan club Sportivo Limpeño at the 2016 Copa Libertadores Femenina, which the club went on to win, with Forbes then being shortlisted as CONCACAF Goalkeeper of the Year and also becoming the first Caribbean footballer to win a trophy in CONMEBOL. In the 2017 Liga Femenina, she was the goalkeeper who received the fewest goals against her.

Forbes also played for her national team at the Pan American Games in 2011 and 2015.

Forbes has a bachelor's degree in Elementary Education and is also a Sports Advisor & Video Analyst for Pro Evolution Coaching in Canada.

She is the elder sister of Karyn Forbes, also an international footballer.

== College career ==
Forbes' successful season in the Secondary Schools Football League (SSFL) Girls' Division in Trinidad earned her a scholarship at the Monroe Community College in New York.

In 2011, Forbes was teammates with English footballer Mikaela Howell at Munroe Mustangs Women's College.

In 2012, Forbes and Howell remained teammates and were joined by Croatian footballer Sandra Zigic in the side.

Forbes attended the University of Maine Fort Kent (UMFK) in 2013 and 2014.

In 2013, she won a United States Collegiate Athletic Association (USCAA) national championship and posted a USCAA-high 14 wins as goalkeeper with an outstanding season.

In 2014, she was awarded Female Athlete of the Year and was also named USCAA First Team All American both years. In 2014 in the Boston Breakers team, Forbes was in an internationally mixed squad accompanied by Colombian Melissa Ortiz, Portuguese Suzane Pires, Canadian Nkem Ezurike, Mexican defender Bianca Sierra and Americans Nikki Washington, Kim Decesare, Bianca D'Agostino, Heather O'Reilly, Maddy Evans, Cat Whitehill and Mollie Pathman. Forbes was later inducted into the University of Maine Fort Kent Hall of Fame.

== Club career ==
=== Wave FC ===
During the 2014/15 season, Forbes featured for native club Wave FC, along with Venezuelan Maleike Pacheco.

In the 2015/16 season, she was in the squad with compatriot and future Sportivo Limpeño colleague Kennya Cordner.

=== Sportivo Limpeño ===
==== 2016 Paraguayan Women's Championship ====
In October 2016, Forbes was approached by Sportivo Limpeño after they had seen a video of her best ever performance against USA in the 2014 CONCACAF Women's Championship.

On 4 November 2016, Paraguayan newspaper HOY announced that Forbes, along with Paraguayan midfielder Dulce Quintana had signed with Sportivo Limpeño ahead of the 2016 Copa Libertadores Femenina. Forbes integrated into a squad with her compatriot with Kennya Cordner, both players became the first two Tobagonian footballers in the country's history to play in Paraguay. Forbes joined from FC Ulindi from a USA University League and arrived in Paraguay without speaking Spanish.

Forbes shared her place in the Sportivo Limpeño squad alongside Paraguayan star Jessica Martínez. Before going into the 2016 Copa Libertadores Femenina, she became back-to-back Champions with Sportivo Limpeño in winning the 2016 Paraguayan Women's Championship. Sportivo Limpeño had defeated Cerro Porteño 4–2 on aggregate (1–1 and then 3–1) to be crowned champions of Paraguay's Women's Championship, and Limpeño's second consecutive league title.

==== 2016 Copa Libertadores Femenina ====
In Sportivo Limpeño's opening fixture of the Copa Libertadores Femenina, they defeated Peruvian club Universitario de Deportes 4–0, with Forbes being the number one goal keeper for Limpeño.

On 9 December, Forbes featured in Sportivo Limpeño's 3–2 victory against Uruguayan club Colón in their group's second fixture.

Sportivo Limpeño finished in first position of their group with 7 points and faced the Brazilian team Foz Cataratas at the semi-final stage of the competition. Limpeño defeated Foz Cataratas 2–0 with Forbes as goalkeeper on 17 December 2016, before advancing to the final where Forbes would play an entire 90 minutes.

On 20 December 2016, Forbes kept for Limpeño in a 2–1 victory against Venezuelan side Estudiantes de Guárico, having been losing 1–0.

Forbes was then shortlisted as CONCACAF Goalkeeper of the Year. She also became the first Caribbean footballer to win a South American trophy. She was in the starting line up and played in Sportivo Limpeño's agonizing 2–1 victory against Venezuelan club Estudiantes de Guarico in the final of the 2016 Copa Libertadores Femenina in December.

=== Independiente Santa Fé ===
==== 2017 Liga Femenina ====
Following her performance at the 2016 Copa Libertadores Femenina, Colombian club Independiente Santa Fé offered her a one-year contract. Her arrival generated high expectations.

By 2017, Forbes still did not speak Spanish but claimed to be able to understand it, did not hesitate to sign with Independiente Santa Fé in Colombia. Amongst her teammates, she did not have anyone with whom she could maintain a fluent conversation in English. Forbes stated in an interview that football in her country was still new and at an initial stage, whilst she had gone to Colombia to play, live the experience, enjoy the opportunity and that it was in Colombia where she could enjoy playing.

In February 2017, Forbes was included in a poll of ten players to decide who would be the 2017 Liga Femenina Star Player. Forbes continued to play for her national team whilst playing for Independiente Santa Fé, receiving a call up for friendlies in March 2017, who was part of an undefeated squad in the Liga Femenina at the time.

In the 2017 Liga Femenina, Forbes was the goalkeeper who received the fewest goals against her.

==== 2017 Copa Libertadores Femenina ====
In 2017, Forbes again featured in the Copa Libertadores Femenina for her second consecutive season as Independiente Santa Fé had qualified as champions of the 2017 Liga Femenina as undefeated champions. At Independiente Santa Fé, she was teammates with Venezuelan Oriana Altuve, who was the team's leading goal scorer with 12 goals in the league, and Costa Rican Melissa Herrera. She also shared the goalkeeping duty with Vanessa Córdoba, the daughter of former Boca Juniors goalkeeper Óscar Córdoba. Santa Fé were grouped against her former Paraguayan club Sportivo Limpeño in the tournament, where they faced Bolivian club Deportivo Ita in their opening fixture as Forbes was considered one of the team's references, amongst other players.

During late 2017, Forbes signed a contract extension with Santa Fé until May 2018 was sched to travel with the side to face Athletico Bilbao’s women's team in Spain in December 2017.

In Colombia, Forbes was happy that women were included in football and because she felt that her work was being valued.

During the 2017 and 2018 Liga Femenina seasons, Forbes was again teammates with Uruguayan player Stephanie Lacoste, with whom she had won the 2016 Copa Libertadores Femenina at Sportivo Limpeño.

Following the 2017 season, Forbes signed a contract extension until May 2018.

=== Millonarios ===
In 2019, Forbes signed with Colombian club Millonarios and was player with the most experience and history in the squad, having already won the 2016 Copa Libertadores with Sportivo Limpeño and the 2017 Liga Femenina as undefeated champions with Independiente Santa Fé. On 13 June 2019, Kimika and her teammates were presented as the Millonarios Femenine Team at the Torre Empresarial Allianz.

In July 2019, Forbes and her team debuted in the Liga Águila Femenina with a victory against Equidad. Forbes conceded the opening goal after an error in the 50th minute before her team came back to win 2–1.

In July 2019, Forbes played for Millonarios against Independiente de Santa Fé, her former club, in a 1–1 draw. In the game, fans from Forbs' former club threw insults at her whilst she played for Millonarios.

== International career ==
Forbes received her first call up for the Trinidad and Tabago national team aged 15 for a fixture against Mexico during the qualifying campaign for the 2007 FIFA Women's World Cup to be held in China.

She was also the number-one goalkeeper for the Trinidad and Tobago U20 Women's team at the CONCACAF Championships.

In October 2011 at the Pan American Games, Forbes completed 270 minutes and played three group stage games as Trinidad & Tabago were eliminated from the Tournament with 1 point. Playing alongside her sister, Karyn, Forbes kept for her side in a 1–0 loss against Colombia, a 1–1 draw against Mexico, and a 3–0 defeat against Chile.

At the 2014 CONCACAF Women's Championship in Kansas City, Forbes went on to become a household name in the United States when she held the USA national team, led by Abby Wambach, to just one goal in a nail-biting final, making several saves along the way to keep her team in the game until the very end. Despite the 1–0 loss, Forbes mad nine saves to keep the game close. Forbes' best save of the game came in the 52nd minute, when she stopped Abby Wambach on a breakaway and Megan Rapinoehit the rebound over the goal. In stoppage time, Forbes again came up big one-on-one, stopping subSydney Lerouxwith her left leg.

Following the game, Trinidad and Tabago coached Randy Waldrum praised Forbes' goalkeeping heroics "She was big-time tonight, wasn’t she? Player of the game for us, for sure. She kept it close and kept us in it. She’s special. She was fantastic tonight. I can’t even describe it in words how many times she came up big for us.”

In July 2015 at the Pan American Games, Forbes again was the national team's first choice keeper, completing 270 minutes in 3 group stage games as Trinidad & Tobago were eliminated from the tournament with 2 points. Playing in the Tournament against with her sister Karyn, Forbes kept in a 2–2 draw against Argentina, a 1–1 draw with Colombia, and a 3–1 loss against Mexico.

In November 2015, Forbes led her national team to the Caribbean Gold Medal in the first round of Olympic Qualifying. Forbes impeded Puerto Rico in the Championship game 1–0 and also posted three other victories in the Championship.

On 4 October 2018, Forbes kept for her national team in a 3–0 defeat against Panama in their first fixture of the CONCACAF Female Championship.

In October 2018, Forbes kept for Trinidad and Tobago in a 4–1 defeat against Mexico during the CONCACAF Qualifiers for the FIFA Women's World Cup.

== Personal life and education ==
Forbes is from Plymouth, Tobago. Forbes prefers that people call her by the name Kimi. Forbes followed the careers and the saves of German goalkeeper Manuel Neuer and Chilean goalkeeper Claudio Bravo, stating that the former is a complete goalkeeper and that latter is an example of whom she wants to be. Forbes is also an admirer of Hope Solo, Almuth Schult and Iker Casillas.

=== Academics ===
She was awarded two academic scholarships, her alma mater is Monroe Community College, New York and the University of Maine Fort Kent (UMFK). In 2014, she graduated with an associate degree in general studies. In 2016, Forbes completed a Bachelor of Arts and Sciences degree. Forbes possesses an associate's degree in Elementary Education and she has also been on the Dean's List every semester since enrolling at UMFK. In 2018, Forbes was inducted into the UMFK's Hall of Fame.

=== Leadership ===
In 2017, Forbes praised Colombia's Liga Profesional and that it was recognizing the place for women in football.

In 2017, Forbes had prepared to launch an academy for goal keepers in Trinidad & Tobago, whilst she would also run women's football events whenever she returned. In 2017, Forbes served as assistant coach for the Signal Hill Secondary Girls team during latter stages of the 2017 Secondary Schools Football League (SSFL) season upon returning home at the conclusion of the Colombian Liga Femenina season. In 2024, she became a volunteer assistant coach for the Maine Maritime Academy women's soccer team.

== Honours ==
Sportivo Limpeño

- Paraguayan women's football championship: 2016
- Copa Libertadores Femenina: 2016

Independiente Santa Fé

- Liga Femenina: 2017

Individual

- First Caribbean to win the Copa Libertadores Femenina.
