= Carmen Benítez =

Paraguayan footballer (born 1986)

Personal information
- Full name: Carmen Rocío Benítez Cabrera
- Date of birth: 5 April 1986 (age 40)
- Height: 1.60 m (5 ft 3 in)
- Position: Right back

Team information
- Current team: Libertad/Limpeño
- Number: 5

Senior career*
| Years | Team | Apps | (Gls) |
- Libertad/Limpeño

International career^{‡}
| 2010–2018 | Paraguay | 4 | (0) |
- * Club domestic league appearances and goals ‡ National team caps and goals as of 8 April 2018

Carmen Rocío Benítez Cabrera (born 5 April 1986) is a Paraguayan footballer who plays as a right back for Libertad/Limpeño. She was a member of the Paraguay women's national team.

== International career ==
Benítez was named in Paraguay's squad for three Copa América Femenina editions (2006, 2010 and 2018).

== Honours ==
=== Club ===
Sportivo Limpeño

- Copa Libertadores Femenina: 2016
