= Gi Santos =

Brazilian footballer (born 1997)

Personal information
- Full name: Giovanna dos Santos Nascimento
- Date of birth: 22 April 1997 (age 29)
- Place of birth: Campo Limpo Paulista, São Paulo, Brazil
- Height: 1.80 m (5 ft 11 in)
- Position: Defender

Team information
- Current team: Damaiense
- Number: 22

Senior career*
Years	Team	Apps	(Gls)
2016	Centro Olímpico		
2016-2017	Foz Cataratas		
2017-2019	Sport Recife		
2019	Foz Cataratas		
2019	Independiente Santa Fe		
2020	F.C. Famalicão		
2021	Beşiktaş	11	(2)
2022	Avaldsnes	1	(0)
2022–	Damaiense	7	(1)

International career
2016	Brazil U20		
- * Club domestic league appearances and goals as of 00:22, 16 May 2023 (UTC)

Giovanna dos Santos Nascimento (born 22 April 1997), known as Gi Santos, is a Brazilian women's association football defender, who plays for Damaiense in Portugal's Campeonato Nacional Feminino. She previously played for Avaldsnes IL in Norway's Toppserien, and played in Brazil, Colombia, Portugal, and Turkey. She was a member of the Brazil women's national U20 team.

== Early life ==
She was born in Campo Limpo Paulista, São Paulo, Brazil on 22 April 1997.

== Club career ==
Gi Santos started her career at the professional women's football club Centro Olímpico in São Paulo in 2016. The same year, she transferred to Foz Cataratas in Foz do Iguaçu Paraná. She took part at the 2016 Copa Libertadores Femenina, and scored a goal. In 2017, she joined Sport Recife in Recife, Pernambuco. After two years, she returned to Foz do Iguaçu for a while. She went to Colombia to play for the transferred to the Bogotá-nased club Independiente Santa Fe. In 2020, she signed with F.C. Famalicão in Vila Nova de Famalicão, Portıgal.

In the beginning of August 2021, she moved to Turkey and joined Beşiktaş J.K., which became champion of the 2020–21 Turkcell League, and so was to play in the 2021–22 UEFA Champions League qualifying rounds. She played in two matches of the 2021–22 UEFA Women's Champions League qualifying rounds.

== International career ==
Gi Santos was a member of the Brazil women's national U20 team.

== Honours ==
Foz Cataratas

- Copa Libertadores Femenina third place: 2016
