= Damia Cortaza =

Paraguayan footballer (born 1993)

Personal information
- Full name: Damia Elizabeth Cortaza Giménez
- Date of birth: 29 September 1993 (age 33)
- Place of birth: Paraguay
- Height: 1.56 m (5 ft 1 in)
- Position: Midfielder

Team information
- Current team: Libertad/Limpeño
- Number: 6

Senior career*
Years	Team	Apps	(Gls)
- Libertad/Limpeño

International career^{‡}
2018–	Paraguay	6	(1)
- * Club domestic league appearances and goals ‡ National team caps and goals as of 31 July 2019

Damia Elizabeth Cortaza Giménez (born 29 September 1993) is a Paraguayan footballer who plays as a midfielder for Libertad/Limpeño and, since 2018, for the Paraguay women's national team.

== International goals ==
Scores and results list Paraguay's goal tally first

No.	Date	Venue	Opponent	Score	Result	Competition
1	8 April 2018	Estadio La Portada, La Serena, Chile	Colombia	1–5	1–5	2018 Copa América Femenina

== Honours ==
=== Club ===
Sportivo Limpeño

- Copa Libertadores Femenina: 2016
