= Laurie Cristaldo =

Paraguayan footballer (born 1997)

Personal information
- Full name: Laurie Celeste Cristaldo Núñez
- Date of birth: 4 May 1997 (age 29)
- Place of birth: Paraguay
- Height: 1.74 m (5 ft 9 in)
- Position: Centre back

Team information
- Current team: Libertad/Limpeño
- Number: 2

Senior career*
Years	Team	Apps	(Gls)
- Libertad/Limpeño

International career^{‡}
2014	Paraguay U17	3	(0)
2014	Paraguay U20	1	(0)
2019–	Paraguay	2	(1)
- * Club domestic league appearances and goals ‡ National team caps and goals as of 31 July 2019

Laurie Celeste Cristaldo Núñez (born 4 May 1997) is a Paraguayan footballer who plays as a centre back for Libertad/Limpeño and the Paraguay women's national team. Before being called up to the senior team, she was a part of the national women's under-20 and under-17 teams.

== International goals ==
Scores and results list Paraguay's goal tally first

No.	Date	Venue	Opponent	Score	Result	Competition
1	31 July 2019	Estadio Universidad San Marcos, Lima, Peru	Mexico	1–0	2–1	2019 Pan American Games

== Honours ==
=== Club ===
Sportivo Limpeño

- Copa Libertadores Femenina: 2016
