= Liz Peña =

Paraguayan footballer (born 1995)

Personal information
- Full name: Liz Natalia Peña Vargas
- Date of birth: 15 June 1995 (age 31)
- Place of birth: Paraguay
- Height: 1.60 m (5 ft 3 in)
- Position: Forward

Team information
- Current team: Libertad/Limpeño
- Number: 11

Senior career*
Years	Team	Apps	(Gls)
–201?	Cerro Porteño		
201?–	Libertad/Limpeño		

International career^{‡}
2018	Paraguay	4	(1)
- * Club domestic league appearances and goals ‡ National team caps and goals as of 12 April 2018

Liz Natalia Peña Vargas (born 15 June 1995), sometimes known as Natalia Peña, is a Paraguayan footballer who plays as a forward for Libertad/Limpeño. She was a member of the Paraguay women's national team.

== International career ==
Peña was part of the Paraguay team that played in the 2018 Copa América Femenina.

=== International goals ===
Scores and results list Paraguay's goal tally first

No.	Date	Venue	Opponent	Score	Result	Competition
1	6 April 2018	Estadio La Portada, La Serena, Chile	Peru	1–0	3–0	2018 Copa América Femenina

== Honours ==
=== Club ===
Sportivo Limpeño

- Copa Libertadores Femenina: 2016
