= Marta Agüero =

Paraguayan footballer (born 1991)

Personal information
- Full name: Marta María Agüero García
- Date of birth: 9 November 1991 (age 34)
- Height: 1.69 m (5 ft 7 in)
- Position: Defender

Team information
- Current team: Cerro Porteño
- Number: 8

Senior career*
Years	Team	Apps	(Gls)
- Sportivo Limpeño
- Cerro Porteño

International career
	Paraguay	1+	(0+)
- * Club domestic league appearances and goals

Marta María Agüero García (born 9 November 1991) is a Paraguayan footballer who plays as a defender for Cerro Porteño and the Paraguay women's national team.

== International career ==
Agüero capped for Paraguay during the 2010 South American Women's Football Championship.

== Honours ==
=== Club ===
Sportivo Limpeño

- Copa Libertadores Femenina: 2016
