= Ysaura Viso =

Venezuelan footballer (born 1993)

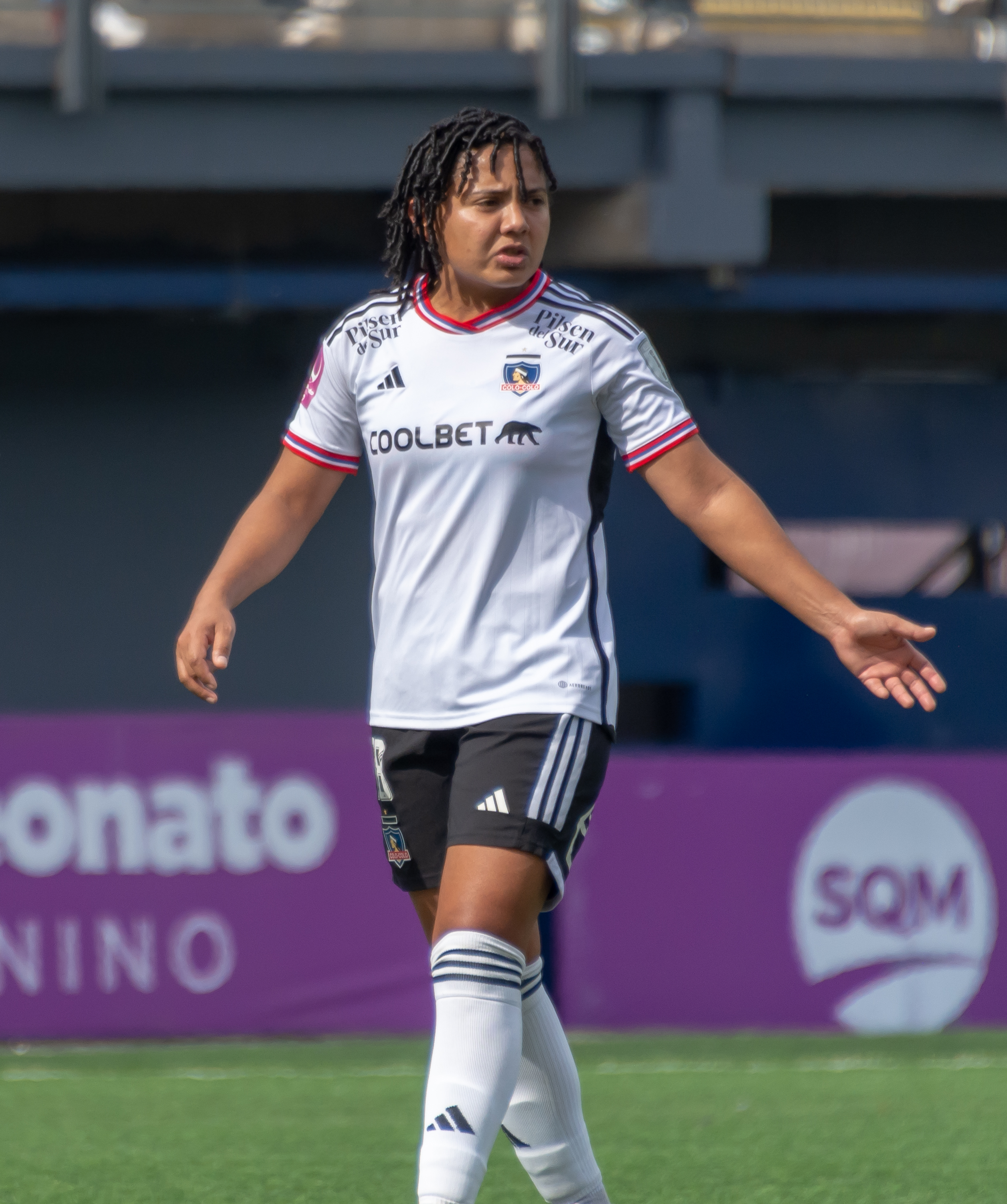

Personal information
- Full name: Ysaura Candelaria Viso Garrido
- Date of birth: 17 June 1993 (age 33)
- Place of birth: San Juan de los Morros, Venezuela
- Height: 1.57 m (5 ft 2 in)
- Position: Striker

Team information
- Current team: Santa Fe

Senior career*
Years	Team	Apps	(Gls)
- Estudiantes de Guárico
- Caracas
2016–2017	FFC Vorderland	29	(59)
2018	Unión Magdalena		
2018	Atlético Huila		
2019	Qinhuangdao Beijing Sport		
2020–2021	Santa Fe		
2021–2023	Colo-Colo		
2024	León	24	(2)
2025	3B da Amazônia	13	(2)
2025-	Santa Fe		

International career^{‡}
2010	Venezuela U17	3	(2)
2010–	Venezuela	40	(17)
Medal record
Women's football
Representing Venezuela
Central American and Caribbean Games
Silver medal – second place	2023 San Salvador
- * Club domestic league appearances and goals ‡ National team caps and goals as of 30 July 2018

Ysaura Candelaria Viso Garrido (born 17 June 1993) is a Venezuelan footballer who plays as a forward for club Santa Fe and the Venezuela women's national team.

== International career ==
Viso represented Venezuela at the 2010 FIFA U-17 Women's World Cup. At the senior level, she was part of the national squad in two Copa América Femenina editions (2010 and 2018) and the 2018 Central American and Caribbean Games.

=== International goals ===
Scores and results list Venezuela's goal tally first

No.	Date	Venue	Opponent	Score	Result	Competition
1	11 November 2010	Estadio Alejandro Serrano Aguilar, Cuenca, Ecuador	Uruguay	1–0	5–2	2010 South American Women's Football Championship
2	11 November 2010	Estadio Alejandro Serrano Aguilar, Cuenca, Ecuador	Uruguay	2–0	5–2	2010 South American Women's Football Championship
3	9 April 2018	Estadio Municipal Francisco Sánchez Rumoroso, Coquimbo, Chile	Bolivia	4–0	8–0	2018 Copa América Femenina
4	9 April 2018	Estadio Municipal Francisco Sánchez Rumoroso, Coquimbo, Chile	Bolivia	5–0	8–0	2018 Copa América Femenina
5	9 April 2018	Estadio Municipal Francisco Sánchez Rumoroso, Coquimbo, Chile	Bolivia	7–0	8–0	2018 Copa América Femenina
6	19 July 2018	Estadio Moderno Julio Torres, Barranquilla, Colombia	Jamaica	1–1	2–1	2018 Central American and Caribbean Games
7	23 July 2018	Estadio Moderno Julio Torres, Barranquilla, Colombia	Costa Rica	1–1	1–2	2018 Central American and Caribbean Games
8	10 November 2022	Estadio Municipal de Chapín, Jerez de la Frontera, Spain	Panama	1–3	1–3	Friendly
9	29 June 2023	Estadio Las Delicias, Santa Tecla, El Salvador	Costa Rica	2–0	4–0	2023 Central American and Caribbean Games
10	29 June 2023	Estadio Las Delicias, Santa Tecla, El Salvador	Costa Rica	4–0	4–0	2023 Central American and Caribbean Games
11	5 July 2023	Estadio Las Delicias, Santa Tecla, El Salvador	El Salvador	1–0	2–1	2023 Central American and Caribbean Games
12	7 July 2023	Estadio Las Delicias, Santa Tecla, El Salvador	Mexico	1–1	1–2 (a.e.t.)	2023 Central American and Caribbean Games
13	5 April 2024	Brígido Iriarte Stadium, Caracas, Venezuela	Panama	2–0	2–0	Friendly
14	8 April 2024	Brígido Iriarte Stadium, Caracas, Venezuela	Panama	2–0	3–0	Friendly
15	8 April 2024	Brígido Iriarte Stadium, Caracas, Venezuela	Panama	3–0	3–0	Friendly
16	23 October 2024	Centro de Alto Rendimiento, Mexico City, Mexico	Thailand	1–0	2–0	Friendly
17	5 April 2025	Centro Nacional de Alto Rendimiento, Los Robles La Paz, Venezuela	Panama	1–0	1–0	Friendly

== Honours and achievements ==
Estudiantes de Guárico

- Liga Nacional (2): 2013, 2015

Atlético Huila

- Copa Libertadores Femenina (1): 2018

Santa Fe

- Liga Profesional (1): 2020

Colo-Colo

- Primera División (2): 2022, 2023

Individual

- Copa Libertadores Femenina Top Goalscorer: 2011, 2014
- Liga Nacional de Venezuela Best Player: 2015
- Liga Profesional de Colombia Top Goalscorer: 2020
- Gala Crack Easy - Best Player: 2022
- Premios FutFem - Best Forward: 2022
