= Natasha Rosas =

Venezuelan footballer (born 1993)

Personal information
- Full name: Natasha Sofía Rosas López
- Date of birth: 21 August 1993 (age 33)
- Place of birth: Cumaná, Sucre, Venezuela
- Height: 1.55 m (5 ft 1 in)
- Positions: Defensive midfielder; left back

Team information
- Current team: Mirassol
- Number: 20

Youth career
- Mickey Sport

Senior career*
Years	Team	Apps	(Gls)
2016	Deportivo Anzoátegui		
2016	Hermanos Páez		
2017	Patriotas		
2017	Estudiantes de Guárico		
2018	Patriotas		
2019	3B da Amazônia	0	(0)
2019	Santa Fe		
2020	3B da Amazônia	0	(0)
2021–2024	Real Brasília		
2025	3B da Amazônia		
2026–	Mirassol		

International career^{‡}
2010	Venezuela U17	3	(0)
2017–	Venezuela	2	(0)
- * Club domestic league appearances and goals as of 26 May 2019 ‡ National team caps and goals as of 8 October 2019

Natasha Sofía Rosas López (born 21 August 1993) is a Venezuelan professional footballer who plays as a defensive midfielder for Brazilian club Mirassol and the Venezuela women's national team.

== Club career ==
Rosas is a former player of Deportivo Anzoátegui and Hermanos Páez.

== International career ==
Rosas represented Venezuela at the 2010 FIFA U-17 Women's World Cup. At senior level, she played a friendly match against Colombia in 2017.
