= Cinthia Zarabia =

Venezuelan footballer (born 1992)

Personal information
- Full name: Cinthia Anais Zarabia Pulgar
- Date of birth: 24 November 1992 (age 33)
- Place of birth: Calabozo, Venezuela
- Height: 1.58 m (5 ft 2 in)
- Positions: Midfielder; forward

Senior career*
Years	Team	Apps	(Gls)
- Caracas
- Estudiantes de Guárico
- Caracas
2016	Estudiantes de Guárico		
2017	Unión Magdalena		
2017	Estudiantes de Guárico		
2018	Junior		
2018	FFC Vorderland	9	(0)
2019	3B da Amazônia	7	(2)
2019	Atlético Huila	1	(0)
2020	Iranduba	10	(1)

International career^{‡}
2010	Venezuela	2	(0)
- * Club domestic league appearances and goals as of 14 October 2020 ‡ National team caps and goals as of 13 April 2018

Cinthia Anais Zarabia Pulgar (born 24 November 1992) is a Venezuelan professional footballer who plays as a midfielder. She was a member of the Venezuela women' national team.

== International career ==
Zarabia played for Venezuela at senior level in the 2010 Central American and Caribbean Games. She was also a part of the roster for the 2018 Copa América Femenina, but did not play.
