= Verónica Riveros =

Paraguayan footballer (born 1987)

Personal information
- Full name: Hilda Verónica Riveros Izquierdo
- Date of birth: 23 April 1987 (age 39)
- Place of birth: Paraguay
- Height: 1.72 m (5 ft 8 in)
- Position: Centre back

Team information
- Current team: Mirassol
- Number: 15

Senior career*
Years	Team	Apps	(Gls)
- UAA
2013–2019	Foz Cataratas	69	(10)
2020	Avaí/Kindermann	0	(0)
2021	Napoli	15	(0)
2022	São José	9	(0)
2023	Avaí	0	(0)
2024–2025	Independiente del Valle		
2026–	Mirassol		

International career^{‡}
2006	Paraguay U20	1+	(1)
2006–	Paraguay	14	(1)
- * Club domestic league appearances and goals as of 26 February 2023 ‡ National team caps and goals as of 7 November 2019

Hilda Verónica Riveros Izquierdo (born 23 April 1987), known as Verónica Riveros, is a Paraguayan professional footballer who plays as a centre back for Brazilian Paulistão F club Mirassol and the Paraguay women's national team. She was also a member of the national under-20 team.

== International career ==
Riveros represented Paraguay at the 2006 South American U-20 Women's Championship. At the senior level, she played four Copa América Femenina editions (2006, 2010, 2014 and 2018).

=== International goals ===
Scores and results list Paraguay's goal tally first

No.	Date	Venue	Opponent	Score	Result	Competition
1	18 September 2014	Estadio Alejandro Serrano Aguilar, Cuenca, Ecuador	Bolivia	2–0	10–2	2014 Copa América Femenina
