= Stephanie Lacoste =

Uruguayan footballer (born 1996)

Personal information
- Full name: Stephanie Lacoste Gularte
- Date of birth: 9 September 1996 (age 30)
- Place of birth: Montevideo, Uruguay
- Height: 1.62 m (5 ft 4 in)
- Position: Centre back

Team information
- Current team: Universitario

Senior career*
Years	Team	Apps	(Gls)
2014	River Plate Montevideo		
2014–2015	Olimpia		
2016	River Plate Montevideo	2	(0)
2016	Sportivo Limpeño		
2017	Santa Fe		
2017	Sportivo Limpeño		
2018	Santa Fe		
2018	Peñarol		
2019	Libertad/Limpeño		
2020	Famalicão	6	(0)
2020–2021	Real Oviedo	17	(1)
2021	Sol de América	3	(0)
2022	Real Oviedo	13	(2)
2022–	Universitario	0	(0)

International career
2014	Uruguay U20		
2014–	Uruguay	5	(0)
- * Club domestic league appearances and goals as of 28 June 2022

Stephanie Lacoste Gularte (born 9 September 1996), also known as Fefa, is a Uruguayan footballer who plays as a centre back for Peruvian side Club Universitario de Deportes and the Uruguay women's national team.

== Club career ==
In January 2020, Lacoste joined Portuguese club Famalicão. In June 2020, she joined Spanish club Real Oviedo. In 2021, she joined Paraguayan club Sol de América.

== International career ==
Lacoste represented Uruguay at the 2014 South American U-20 Women's Championship. At senior level, she played the 2014 Copa América Femenina.

== International goals ==
No.	Date	Venue	Opponent	Score	Result	Competition
1.	7 April 2023	Estadio Parque Capurro, Montevideo, Uruguay	Peru	2–0	6–1	Friendly
2.	30 May 2025	Estadio Universitario BUAP, Puebla, Mexico	Mexico	1–2	2–2	Friendly

== Honours ==
=== Club ===
Sportivo Limpeño

- Copa Libertadores Femenina: 2016
