= Rosa Aquino =

Paraguayan footballer (born 1990)

Personal information
- Full name: Rosa Yisell Aquino Mareco
- Date of birth: 15 September 1990 (age 36)
- Height: 1.56 m (5 ft 1 in)
- Position: Midfielder

Senior career*
Years	Team	Apps	(Gls)
- Cerro Porteño
- Sportivo Limpeño

International career^{‡}
2010	Paraguay	1	(0)
- * Club domestic league appearances and goals ‡ National team caps and goals as of 7 November 2010

Rosa Yisell Aquino Mareco (born 15 September 1990) is a Paraguayan footballer who has played as a midfielder for Sportivo Limpeño and the Paraguay women's national team.

== International career ==
Aquino played for Paraguay at senior level in the 2010 South American Women's Football Championship.

== Honours ==
=== Club ===
Sportivo Limpeño

- Copa Libertadores Femenina: 2016
