= María Laura Gómez =

Bolivian footballer (born 1993)

Personal information
- Full name: María Laura Gómez Cabello
- Date of birth: 16 May 1993 (age 33)
- Positions: Defender; midfielder

Team information
- Current team: Deportivo ITA

Senior career*
Years	Team	Apps	(Gls)
- San Martín de Porres
- Deportivo ITA

International career^{‡}
2013	Bolivia U20		
2010–2018	Bolivia	6	(0)
- * Club domestic league appearances and goals ‡ National team caps and goals as of 13 April 2018

María Laura Gómez Cabello (born 16 May 1993) is a Bolivian footballer who plays as a defender for Deportivo ITA and the Bolivia women's national team.

== Early life ==
Gómez hails from the Tarija Department.

== Club career ==
Gómez won the Bolivian football championship with San Martin in 2016. She scored a goal during the 2016 Copa Libertadores Femenina.

== International career ==
Gómez played for Bolivia at senior level in two Copa América Femenina editions (2010 and 2018) and the 2014 South American Games.
