= Milagros Mendoza =

Venezuelan footballer (born 1987)

Personal information
- Full name: Milagros Coromoto Mendoza Díaz
- Date of birth: 11 December 1987 (age 38)
- Height: 1.65 m (5 ft 5 in)
- Positions: Centre back; defensive midfielder

Team information
- Current team: Yaracuyanos

Senior career*
| Years | Team | Apps | (Gls) |
| –2017 | Estudiantes de Guárico | | |
| 2018 | Unión Magdalena | | |
| 2019 | 3B da Amazônia | 0 | (0) |
| 2019– | Yaracuyanos | | |

International career^{‡}
| 2006– | Venezuela | 2 | (0) |
- * Club domestic league appearances and goals ‡ National team caps and goals as of 4 October 2019

Milagros Coromoto Mendoza Díaz (born 11 December 1987) is a Venezuelan footballer who plays as a centre back for Yaracuyanos FC and the Venezuela women's national team.

== International career ==
Mendoza played for Venezuela at senior level in two Copa América Femenina editions (2006 and 2014).
