= Amada Peralta =

Paraguayan footballer (born 1994)

Personal information
- Full name: Amada María Peralta Cabrera
- Date of birth: 14 June 1994 (age 32)
- Place of birth: Paraguay
- Height: 1.60 m (5 ft 3 in)
- Position: Forward

Team information
- Current team: Olimpia
- Number: 9

Senior career*
Years	Team	Apps	(Gls)
2021	Santa Fe	9	(1)
2022-	Olimpia	45	(53)

International career^{‡}
2018–	Paraguay	6	(2)
- * Club domestic league appearances and goals ‡ National team caps and goals as of 12 April 2018

Amada María Peralta Cabrera (born 14 June 1994) is a Paraguayan footballer who plays as a forward for Olimpia and the Paraguay women's national team.

== International career ==
Peralta was part of the Paraguayan squad at the 2018 Copa América Femenina.

=== International goals ===
Scores and results list Paraguay's goal tally first

No.	Date	Venue	Opponent	Score	Result	Competition
1	6 April 2018	Estadio La Portada, La Serena, Chile	Peru	3–0	3–0	2018 Copa América Femenina
2	12 April 2018	Estadio La Portada, La Serena, Chile	Uruguay	2–1	2–1	2018 Copa América Femenina
