= Júlia Daltoé =

Brazilian footballer

Personal information
- Full name: Júlia Daltoé Lordes
- Date of birth: 24 November 2001 (age 24)
- Place of birth: Encantado, Brazil
- Height: 1.72 m (5 ft 8 in)
- Position: Midfielder

Team information
- Current team: Mirassol

Youth career
- 2014–2017: Chapecoense
- 2017–2018: Internacional

Senior career*
Years	Team	Apps	(Gls)
2016–2017	Chapecoense		
2018–2020	Internacional	46	(9)
2021–2025	Santos	71	(7)
2026–	Mirassol	0	(0)

International career
2018	Brazil U17	9	(3)
- * Club domestic league appearances and goals as of 19:44, 29 December 2025 (UTC)

Júlia Daltoé Lordes (born 24 November 2001), known as Júlia Daltoé or just Júlia, is a Brazilian footballer who plays as a midfielder for Mirassol.

== Club career ==
Born in Encantado, Rio Grande do Sul, Júlia joined Chapecoense's at the age of 12. She first appeared with the main squad in 2016, aged only 15, and moved to Internacional in 2017, initially for the youth setup.

Júlia started to feature in the first team of Inter during the 2018 campaign, helping in the club's promotion to the Campeonato Brasileiro Série A1 at the end of the season. In February 2021, she moved to Santos FC.

Júlia would spend most of the 2023 and 2024 seasons struggling with injuries, but still renewed her contract with the Sereias da Vila for a further year on 29 November 2024.

== Honours ==
Santos

- Copa Paulista de Futebol Feminino: 2024
- Campeonato Brasileiro de Futebol Feminino Série A2: 2025
