= Anabel Guzmán =

Venezuelan footballer (born 1991)

Personal information
- Full name: Anabel del Carmen Guzmán Rodríguez
- Date of birth: 8 September 1991 (age 35)
- Place of birth: Caracas, Venezuela
- Height: 1.55 m (5 ft 1 in)
- Positions: Centre back; defensive midfielder

Team information
- Current team: Colo-Colo
- Number: 8

Senior career*
Years	Team	Apps	(Gls)
–2014	Caracas		
2015	Estudiantes de Guárico		
2016	Caracas		
2017–	Colo-Colo		

International career^{‡}
2010	Venezuela	1	(0)
- * Club domestic league appearances and goals ‡ National team caps and goals as of 7 November 2010

Anabel del Carmen Guzmán Rodríguez (born 8 September 1991) is a Venezuelan footballer who plays as a centre back for Chilean club Colo-Colo. She has been a member of the Venezuela women's national team.

== International career ==
Guzmán played for Venezuela at senior level in the 2010 South American Women's Football Championship.
