= Mirassol Futebol Clube (women) =

Brazilian association women's football club based in Mirassol, São Paulo, Brazil

Mirassol
- Full name: Mirassol Futebol Clube
- Nickname: Leoas Paulistas (Lionesses of São Paulo)
- Founded: 2025; 1 year ago
- Ground: José Maria de Campos Maia
- Capacity: 15,023
- President: Edson Ermenegildo
- Head coach: Carine Bosetti
- League: Paulistão F
- Website: www.mirassolfc.com.br
| Home colors | Away colors | Third colors |

Mirassol Futebol Clube is a Brazilian professional women's football club based in Mirassol, São Paulo. Founded on 9 November 1925, Mirassol began organizing its club's women's division in late 2025, due to the requirement that clubs competing in CONMEBOL tournaments have dedicated women's soccer programs.

With the men's team's historic qualification for the Libertadores confirmed, the club announced the launch of its women's team, choosing to establish the team from scratch rather than partnering with an existing club.

== History ==
In its first year of operation, Mirassol Women's has a separate training center, which was purchased by the team and will be brought up to the same standard as the facilities available at the Men's Football Training Center.

For the debut season, Rafa Esteves will serve as the section's executive and Carine Bosetti as head coach of the first team. Since its inception, the squad has been under professional contracts.

In its first year, the team also secured a spot in the Paulista Under-15 Championship, putting together its first youth squad.

On 18 March 2026, it was confirmed that the team would compete in the 2026 edition of the Paulistão F. The team's first professional match took place on 6 May 2026, as the visiting team at Arena Barueri against Palmeiras; the match ended in a 5–0 victory for the opposing team.

== Players ==
=== Current squad ===
As of 18 May 2026.

Note: Flags indicate national team as defined under FIFA eligibility rules; some limited exceptions apply. Players may hold more than one non-FIFA nationality.

| No. | Pos. | Nation | Player |
|---|---|---|---|
| 1 | GK | BRA | Amanda |
| 2 | DF | BRA | Raquel Santiago |
| 4 | DF | BRA | Evelin Santos |
| 5 | MF | BRA | Duda Batista |
| 6 | DF | BRA | Katielle |
| 7 | FW | BRA | Raissa Silva |
| 8 | MF | BRA | Gabi Batista |
| 9 | FW | BRA | Emelli |
| 10 | MF | BRA | Júlia Daltoé |
| 11 | FW | BRA | Naiane |
| 12 | DF | BRA | Vitória Kaíssa |
| 15 | DF | PAR | Verónica Riveros |

| No. | Pos. | Nation | Player |
|---|---|---|---|
| 16 | MF | BRA | Bárbara Araújo |
| 18 | FW | BRA | Giovana Borges |
| 19 | DF | BRA | Siméia |
| 20 | DF | VEN | Natasha Rosas |
| 25 | MF | BRA | Kika Brandino |
| 27 | FW | BRA | Érica Bispo |
| 77 | GK | BRA | Ágatha Basílio |
| 88 | FW | BRA | Danny Teixeira |
| 94 | GK | BRA | Lia Nogueira |
| 97 | MF | BRA | Pâmela Dutra |
| — | DF | BRA | Leandra (on loan from Santos) |
