= Lisbeth Bandrés =

Venezuelan footballer (born 1988)

Personal information
- Full name: Lisbeth Yanneri Bandrés Alvarado
- Date of birth: 24 March 1988 (age 38)
- Place of birth: Valencia, Carabobo, Venezuela
- Height: 1.58 m (5 ft 2 in)
- Position: Midfielder

Team information
- Current team: Atlético SC

Senior career*
Years	Team	Apps	(Gls)
- Caracas
- Alianza Petrolera
- Caracas
- Atlético SC

International career^{‡}
2006–2018	Venezuela	12	(3)
- * Club domestic league appearances and goals ‡ National team caps and goals as of 13 April 2018

Lisbeth Yanneri Bandrés Alvarado (born 24 March 1988) is a Venezuelan footballer who plays as a midfielder for Atlético SC. She was a member of the Venezuela women's national team.

== International career ==
Bandrés played for Venezuela at senior level in three Copa América Femenina editions (2006, 2010 and 2018) and the 2010 Central American and Caribbean Games.

=== International goals ===
Scores and results list Venezuela's goal tally first

No.	Date	Venue	Opponent	Score	Result	Competition
1	24 July 2010	Estadio José Pachencho Romero, Maracaibo, Venezuela	Guatemala	2–0	2–1	2010 Central American and Caribbean Games
2	26 July 2010	Estadio Metropolitano, Mérida, Venezuela	Trinidad and Tobago	1–0	1–0	2010 Central American and Caribbean Games
3	1 August 2010	Juan Ramón Loubriel Stadium, Bayamón, Puerto Rico	Puerto Rico	1–0	1–1	2010 Central American and Caribbean Games
