= Yaribeth Ulacio =

Venezuelan footballer (born 1993)

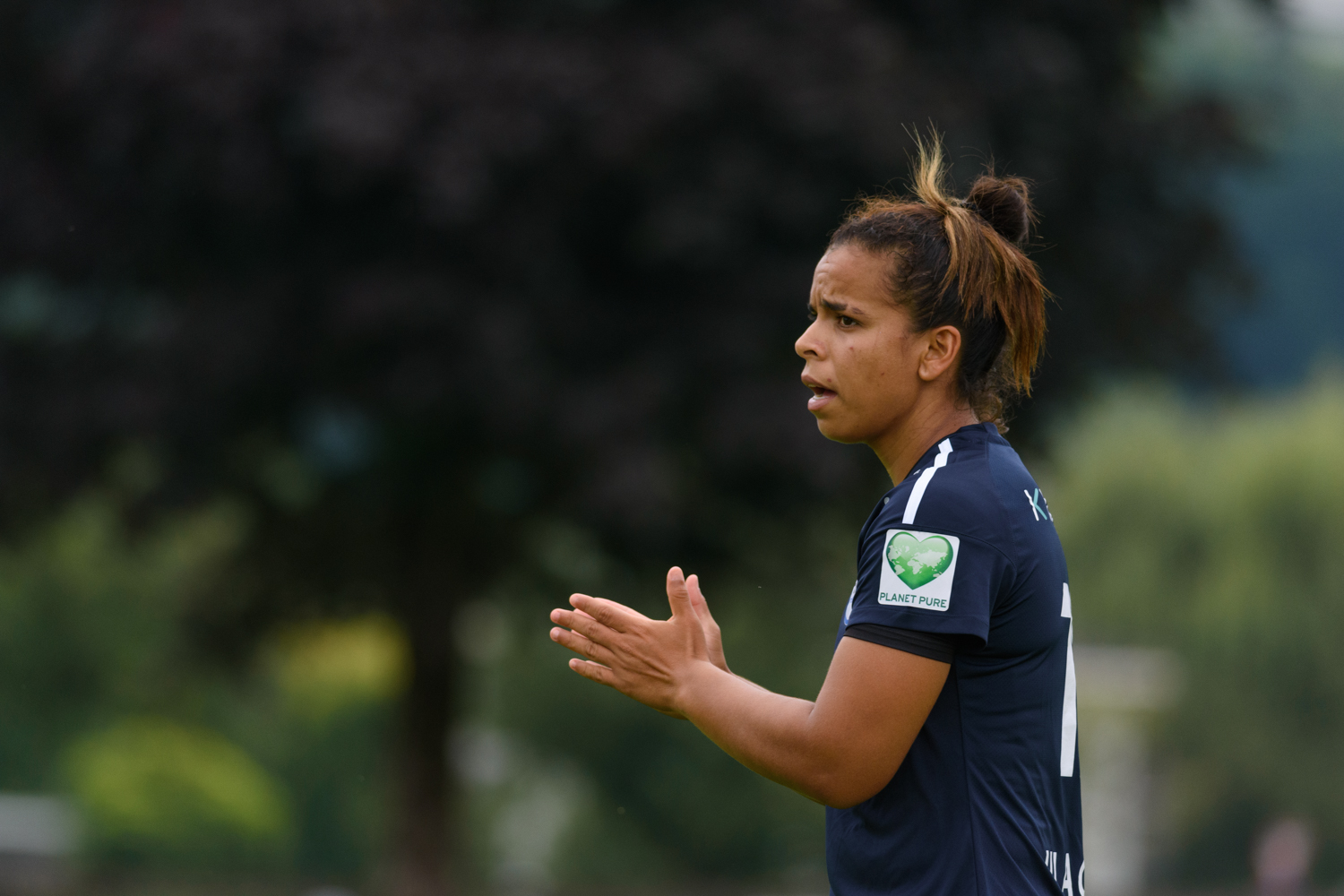
- Ulacio during a friendly, 2020

Personal information
- Full name: Yaribeth Andreína Ulacio Villanueva
- Date of birth: 10 January 1993 (age 33)
- Height: 1.71 m (5 ft 7 in)
- Position: Defender

Team information
- Current team: FFC Vorderland
- Number: 12

Senior career*
Years	Team	Apps	(Gls)
–2016	Estudiantes de Guárico		
2017–	FFC Vorderland	54	(0)

International career^{‡}
2010	Venezuela U17	3	(0)
2019–	Venezuela	2	(0)
- * Club domestic league appearances and goals as of 17 November 2019 ‡ National team caps and goals as of 8 October 2019

Yaribeth Andreína Ulacio Villanueva (born 10 January 1993) is a Venezuelan footballer who plays as a defender for Austrian ÖFB-Frauenliga club FFC Vorderland and the Venezuela women's national team.

== International career ==
Ulacio represented Venezuela at the 2010 FIFA U-17 Women's World Cup. She made her senior debut on 4 October 2019 in a 1–1 friendly draw against Paraguay.
