= Maryorie Hernández =

Chilean footballer (born 1990)

Personal information
- Full name: Maryorie Belén Hernández Collao
- Date of birth: 20 March 1990 (age 36)
- Place of birth: Chile
- Height: 1.61 m (5 ft 3 1/2 in)
- Position: Forward

Senior career*
Years	Team	Apps	(Gls)
2013–2018	Palestino		
2019–2020	3B da Amazônia		
2021	Colo-Colo		
2024	Magallanes		

International career
2008	Chile U20		
2011–2015	Chile (futsal)		
2014–2019	Chile	11	(2)
- * Club domestic league appearances and goals

Maryorie Belén Hernández Collao (born 20 March 1990) is a Chilean former footballer who played as a forward.

== Career ==
Hernández retired at the end of the 2021 season and returned to play football by signing with Magallanes for the 2024 season.

At international level, Hernández represented Chile at the 2008 FIFA U-20 Women's World Cup. Hernández also represented the Chile national futsal team in the Copa América de Futsal Femenina in 2011 and 2015.

== Personal life ==
She got civil union with the footballer María José Urrutia on 15 May 2023. She got pregnant with twins in 2025.
