= Oriana Altuve =

Venezuelan footballer (born 1992)

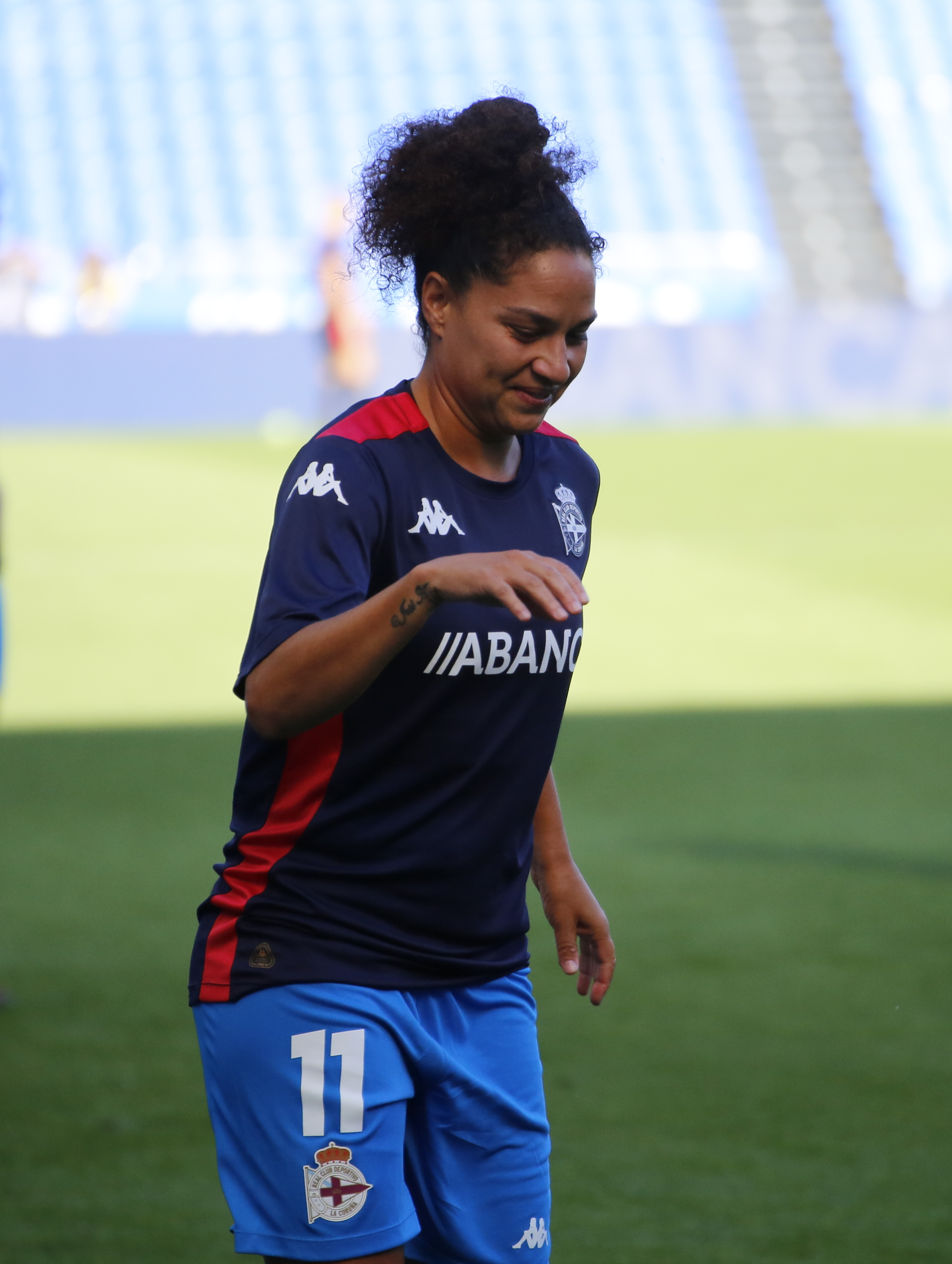
- Altuve in 2024

Personal information
- Full name: Oriana Yoselyn Altuve Mancilla
- Date of birth: 3 October 1992 (age 34)
- Place of birth: Caracas, Venezuela
- Height: 1.63 m (5 ft 4 in)
- Position: Striker

Team information
- Current team: Eastern Flames
- Number: 9

Senior career*
Years	Team	Apps	(Gls)
2008–2016	Caracas		
2016	Colón Montevideo	12	(11)
2017–2018	Independiente Santa Fe		
2018–2020	Rayo Vallecano	46	(23)
2020–2021	Real Betis	30	(2)
2021–2023	Valencia	27	(6)
2023–2024	Al Shabab	14	(14)
2024	Deportivo La Coruña	4	(0)
2025	Ankara BB Fomget	11	(4)
2025–	Eastern Flames		

International career
2010–	Venezuela	24	(10)
- * Club domestic league appearances and goals as of 4 May 2025

Oriana Yoselyn Altuve Mancilla (born 3 October 1992) is a Venezuelan professional footballer who plays as a forward for Eastern Flames in the Saudi Women's Premier League and the Venezuela women's national team.

== Club career ==
Altuve started her career at Caracas, before moving abroad to join Colón Montevideo and Independiente Santa Fe. She later played in Spain for Rayo Vallecano, Real Betis and Valencia. In August 2023, she joined Saudi club Al Shabab.

In January 2025, she moved to Turkey, and signed a deal with Ankara BB Fomget to play in the second half of the 2024–25 Super League season. She won the champions title in that season.

== International career ==
Altuve represented Venezuela at two editions of Central American and Caribbean Games (2010 and 2018) and two Copa América Femenina editions (2010 and 2018).

== Career statistics ==
=== International goals ===
Scores and results list Venezuela's goal tally first

No.	Date	Venue	Opponent	Score	Result	Competition
1	24 July 2010	Estadio José Pachencho Romero, Maracaibo, Venezuela	Guatemala	2–0	2–1	2010 Central American and Caribbean Games
2	28 July 2010	Estadio Metropolitano, Mérida, Venezuela	Nicaragua	1–0	1–0	2010 Central American and Caribbean Games
3	30 July 2010	Estadio Metropolitano, Mérida, Venezuela	Haiti	3–0	3–1	2010 Central American and Caribbean Games
4	9 April 2018	Estadio Municipal Francisco Sánchez Rumoroso, Coquimbo, Chile	Bolivia	6–0	8–0	2018 Copa América Femenina
5	21 July 2018	Estadio Moderno Julio Torres, Barranquilla, Colombia	Colombia	1–3	2–3	2018 Central American and Caribbean Games
6	21 July 2018	Estadio Moderno Julio Torres, Barranquilla, Colombia	Colombia	2–3	2–3	2018 Central American and Caribbean Games
7	23 October 2024	Centro de Alto Rendimiento, Mexico City, Mexico	Thailand	2–0	2–0	Friendly
8	8 April 2025	Centro Nacional de Alto Rendimiento, Los Robles La Paz, Venezuela	Panama	1–1	1–1	Friendly

== Honours and achievements ==
Caracas

- Venezuelan women's football championship: 2009, 2009/10, 2011, 2012 and 2014

Colón Montevideo

- Campeonato Uruguayo Femenino: 2016

Independiente Santa Fe

- Colombian Women's Football League: 2017

Ankara BB Fomget

- Turkish Women's Football Super League: 2024–25

Individual

- Copa Libertadores Femenina top scorer: 2016 and 2017
