= Lisbeth Castro =

Venezuelan footballer (born 1988)

Personal information
- Date of birth: April 28, 1988 (age 38)
- Place of birth: Libertad de Orituco, Venezuela
- Height: 1.74 m (5 ft 9 in)
- Position: Goalkeeper

Team information
- Current team: Zaragoza CFF
- Number: 13

Youth career
- 2011–: Estudiantes de Guárico

Senior career*
Years	Team	Apps	(Gls)
2010–2011	Caracas		
2011–2016	Estudiantes de Guárico		
2017	Unión Magdalena		
2018	Audax	10	(0)
2020–	Zaragoza CFF	25	(0)

International career
2006–	Venezuela	13	(1)
- * Club domestic league appearances and goals as of 28 May 2022

Lisbeth Castro (born 28 April 1988) is a Venezuelan footballer who plays as goalkeeper for Spanish Segunda División Pro club Zaragoza CFF and the Venezuela women's national team.
