= Formas Íntimas =

- Full name: Club Deportivo Formas Íntimas
- Founded: 2002
- President: Liliana María Zapata Sierra
- Manager: Juan Carlos Muñoz
Home colours	Away colours	Third colours

Club Deportivo Formas Íntimas or Formas Íntimas for short, is a Colombian women's football club based in Medellín. They compete in the tournaments organized by the amateur Antioquia Football League (Liga Antioqueña de Fútbol), although they have also been able to participate in the professional Colombian Women's Football League through alliances with professional clubs based in the Antioquia Department, such as Envigado, Independiente Medellín, and Atlético Nacional.

== History ==
The club was founded officially in 2002 by the clothing company Formas Íntimas. However, they competed in the Liga Antioqueña de Fútbol since 2001, officially joining in 2003.

The club's first great achievement was to represent Colombian football in the inaugural 2009 Copa Libertadores de Fútbol Femenino. The club earned this right after the Federación Colombiana de Fútbol determined that they are the most representative women's club, due to their success in all levels of the Colombia women's national football team and their achievements in the Torneo de la Feria de las Flores.

Formas Íntimas finished second in Group B, behind Universidad Autónoma of Paraguay, thereby proceeding to the semifinals, where they lost 5–0 to eventual champions Santos of Brazil. Formas Íntimas then defeated Everton of Chile 2–0 to capture the third place.

Formas Íntimas were eliminated in the group stage of the 2010 Copa Libertadores as Group A's bottom team. In the 2011 edition, the team was second in Group C, which was not enough to qualify for the semifinals.

Given their status as a non-professional club, Formas Íntimas were unable to join the Colombian Women's Football League under their own name, thus they started a two-year partnership with Envigado in 2017 and participated in the first two editions of the women's league. In 2019, they started a new partnership with Independiente Medellín. This alliance with Independiente Medellín ended in 2022, and shortly after they started a partnership with Atlético Nacional.

== Last squad (2015) ==
As of 29 October 2015

Note: Flags indicate national team as defined under FIFA eligibility rules; some limited exceptions apply. Players may hold more than one non-FIFA nationality.

No.	Pos.	Nation	Player
1	GK	(Colombia) COL	Alexandra Avendaño
2	DF	(Colombia) COL	Dora Grisales
3	MF	(Colombia) COL	Viviana Cardona
4	MF	(Colombia) COL	Diana Ospina
5	MF	(Colombia) COL	Paula Botero
6	MF	(Colombia) COL	Daniela Montoya
7	MF	(Colombia) COL	Katherine García
8	MF	(Colombia) COL	Geraldine Cardona
9	FW	(Colombia) COL	Jenifer Peñaloza
10	MF	(Colombia) COL	Catalina Usme

No.	Pos.	Nation	Player
11	FW	(Colombia) COL	Yisela Cuesta
12	GK	(Colombia) COL	Sandra Sepúlveda
13	MF	(Colombia) COL	Laura Aguirre
14	DF	(Colombia) COL	Nataly Arias
15	FW	(Colombia) COL	Oriánica Velásquez
16	GK	(Colombia) COL	Manuela Vanegas
17	DF	(Colombia) COL	Tatiana Castañeda
18	FW	(Colombia) COL	Juliana Sierra
19	MF	(Colombia) COL	Angie Téllez
20	MF	(Colombia) COL	Camila Saldarriaga

== Honours ==
=== National ===
- Copa Libertadores
  - Runners-up (1): 2013
