= 2018 Copa América Femenina =

Eighth edition of the CONMEBOL Copa América Femenina

CONMEBOL Copa América Femenina Chile 2018
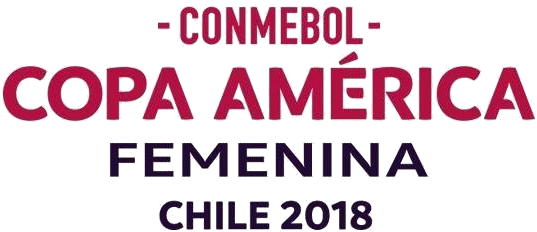

Tournament details
- Host country: Chile
- Dates: 4–22 April
- Teams: 10 (from 1 confederation)
- Venue: 2 (in 2 host cities)

Final positions
- Champions: Brazil (7th title)
- Runners-up: Chile
- Third place: Argentina
- Fourth place: Colombia

Tournament statistics
- Matches played: 26
- Goals scored: 99 (3.81 per match)
- Top scorer: (Colombia) Catalina Usme (9 goals)
- Fair play award: Chile

The 2018 Copa América Femenina was the eighth edition of the CONMEBOL Copa América Femenina (also referred to as the Copa América Femenina), the quadrennial international football competition for women's national teams in South America affiliated with CONMEBOL. The tournament was played between 4 and 22 April 2018 in Chile.

The tournament provided two direct qualifying places and a play-off place (against the fourth-placed team from CONCACAF) for the 2019 FIFA Women's World Cup in France, one direct qualifying place and a play-off place (against the second-placed team from CAF) for the 2020 Summer Olympic women's football tournament in Japan, and three (teams finishing third to fifth) for the 2019 Pan American Games women's football tournament in Lima, besides Peru who qualified automatically as hosts.

Brazil successfully defended their title, winning all their matches. It was their seventh Copa América Femenina title.

== Host selection ==
Chile had been named as hosts in April 2017. Dates were announced on 21 July 2017.

== Teams ==
All ten CONMEBOL member national teams entered the tournament.

| Team | Appearance | Previous best performance | FIFA ranking at start of event |
|---|---|---|---|
| Argentina | 7th | Champions (2006) | 37 |
| Bolivia | 7th | Fifth place (1995) | 84 |
| Brazil (holders) | 8th | Champions (1991, 1995, 1998, 2003, 2010, 2014) | 8 |
| Chile (hosts) | 8th | Runners-up (1991) | 40 |
| Colombia | 6th | Runners-up (2010, 2014) | 24 |
| Ecuador | 7th | Third place (2014) | Not ranked |
| Paraguay | 6th | Fourth place (2006) | 50 |
| Peru | 6th | Third place (1998) | 59 |
| Uruguay | 6th | Third place (2006) | 68 |
| Venezuela | 7th | Third place (1991) | 64 |

== Venues ==
On 25 October 2017, the ANFP announced that 3 cities would host the tournament, all of them within the Coquimbo Region.

On 28 March 2018, CONMEBOL announced that the city of Ovalle would no longer host matches, and matches originally to be played at Estadio Diaguita on 8 and 11 April would be moved to La Serena and Coquimbo respectively.

| La Serena | 2018 Copa América Femenina is located in Coquimbo Region | Coquimbo |
|---|---|---|
| Estadio La Portada | 2018 Copa América Femenina is located in Coquimbo Region | Estadio Municipal Francisco Sánchez Rumoroso |
| Capacity: 18,243 | 2018 Copa América Femenina is located in Coquimbo Region | Capacity: 18,750 |

== Draw ==
The draw of the tournament was held on 1 March 2018, 13:00 CLST (UTC−3), at the ANFP Auditorium in Santiago, Chile. The ten teams were drawn into two groups of five teams. The hosts Chile and the defending champions Brazil were seeded into Groups A and B respectively, while the remaining teams were placed into four "pairing pots" according to their results in the 2014 Copa América Femenina.

| Seeds | Pot 1 | Pot 2 | Pot 3 | Pot 4 |
|---|---|---|---|---|
| Chile (Group A); Brazil (Group B) | Colombia; Ecuador | Argentina; Paraguay | Uruguay; Venezuela | Peru; Bolivia |

== Squads ==
Each team could register a maximum of 22 players (three of whom must be goalkeepers).

== Match officials ==
A total of 12 referees and 20 assistant referees were selected for the tournament.

== First stage ==
In the first stage, the teams were ranked according to points (3 points for a win, 1 point for a draw, 0 points for a loss). If tied on points, tiebreakers would be applied in the following order (Regulations Article 18.1):

1. Goal difference;
2. Goals scored;
3. Head-to-head result in games between tied teams;
4. Drawing of lots.

The top two teams of each group advanced to the final stage.

All times are local, CLST (UTC−3).

=== Group A ===
| Pos | Team | Pld | W | D | L | GF | GA | GD | Pts | Qualification |
|---|---|---|---|---|---|---|---|---|---|---|
| 1 | Colombia | 4 | 3 | 1 | 0 | 16 | 2 | +14 | 10 | Final stage |
| 2 | Chile (H) | 4 | 2 | 2 | 0 | 8 | 2 | +6 | 8 | Final stage |
| 3 | Paraguay | 4 | 2 | 1 | 1 | 7 | 7 | 0 | 7 | 2019 Pan American Games |
| 4 | Uruguay | 4 | 0 | 1 | 3 | 2 | 11 | −9 | 1 | |
| 5 | Peru | 4 | 0 | 1 | 3 | 1 | 12 | −11 | 1 | |

Source: CONMEBOL
Rules for classification: First stage tiebreakers
(H) Hosts
4 April 2018
16:45

| Colombia | 7–0 | Uruguay |
|---|---|---|
| Usme 2', 45+1', 57', 90+2'; Montoya 17'; Rincón 43'; Echeverri 58' | Report |

Estadio La Portada, La Serena
Referee: Emikar Calderas (Venezuela)
4 April 2018
19:00

| Chile | 1–1 | Paraguay |
|---|---|---|
| Aedo 62' | Report | Villamayor 53' |

Estadio La Portada, La Serena
Referee: Susana Corella (Ecuador)

6 April 2018
16:45

| Paraguay | 3–0 | Peru |
|---|---|---|
| Peña 70'; J. Martínez 84'; Peralta 90+3' | Report |

Estadio La Portada, La Serena
Referee: Sirley Cornejo (Bolivia)
6 April 2018
19:00

| Chile | 1–1 | Colombia |
|---|---|---|
| Sáez 79' | Report | Usme 49' |

Estadio La Portada, La Serena
Referee: Edina Alves Batista (Brazil)

8 April 2018
16:45

| Uruguay | 1–1 | Peru |
|---|---|---|
| Badell 58' | Report | Martínez 37' |

Estadio La Portada, La Serena
Referee: Salomé di Iorio (Argentina)
8 April 2018
19:00

| Colombia | 5–1 | Paraguay |
|---|---|---|
| Usme 41', 56', 65'; Ospina 70'; Santos 81' | Report | Cortaza 90+2' |

Estadio La Portada, La Serena
Referee: Laura Fortunato (Argentina)

10 April 2018
16:45

| Colombia | 3–0 | Peru |
|---|---|---|
| Usme 23'; Santos 54'; Echeverri 83' | Report |

Estadio La Portada, La Serena
Referee: Sirley Cornejo (Bolivia)
10 April 2018
19:00

| Chile | 1–0 | Uruguay |
|---|---|---|
| Rojas 79' | Report |

Estadio La Portada, La Serena
Referee: Laura Fortunato (Argentina)

12 April 2018
16:45

| Paraguay | 2–1 | Uruguay |
|---|---|---|
| J. Martínez 36'; Peralta 90+2' | Report | Ramírez 1' |

Estadio La Portada, La Serena
Referee: Edina Alves Batista (Brazil)
12 April 2018
19:00

| Peru | 0–5 | Chile |
|---|---|---|
| | Report | Aedo 28', 65'; López 38'; Lara 62'; Rojas 85' |

Estadio La Portada, La Serena
Referee: Emikar Calderas (Venezuela)

=== Group B ===
| Pos | Team | Pld | W | D | L | GF | GA | GD | Pts | Qualification |
|---|---|---|---|---|---|---|---|---|---|---|
| 1 | Brazil | 4 | 4 | 0 | 0 | 22 | 1 | +21 | 12 | Final stage |
| 2 | Argentina | 4 | 3 | 0 | 1 | 12 | 6 | +6 | 9 | Final stage |
| 3 | Venezuela | 4 | 2 | 0 | 2 | 9 | 6 | +3 | 6 | |
| 4 | Bolivia | 4 | 1 | 0 | 3 | 1 | 18 | −17 | 3 | |
| 5 | Ecuador | 4 | 0 | 0 | 4 | 3 | 16 | −13 | 0 | |

Source: CONMEBOL
Rules for classification: First stage tiebreakers
5 April 2018
16:45

| Ecuador | 0–1 | Venezuela |
|---|---|---|
| | Report | Castellanos 85' |

Estadio Municipal Francisco Sánchez Rumoroso, Coquimbo
Referee: Olga Miranda (Paraguay)
5 April 2018
19:00

| Brazil | 3–1 | Argentina |
|---|---|---|
| Bia Zaneratto 17'; Cristiane 57' (pen.); Debinha 90' | Report | Banini 54' |

Estadio Municipal Francisco Sánchez Rumoroso, Coquimbo
Referee: Claudia Umpiérrez (Uruguay)

7 April 2018
16:45

| Argentina | 3–0 | Bolivia |
|---|---|---|
| Jaimes 33' (pen.), 39'; Larroquette 71' | Report |

Estadio Municipal Francisco Sánchez Rumoroso, Coquimbo
Referee: Elizabeth Tintaya (Peru)
7 April 2018
19:00

| Brazil | 8–0 | Ecuador |
|---|---|---|
| Cristiane 10', 90+2'; Bia Zaneratto 21', 81'; Andressinha 48'; Formiga 65'; Rafaelle 70'; Debinha 86' | Report |

Estadio Municipal Francisco Sánchez Rumoroso, Coquimbo
Referee: Dione Rissios (Chile)

9 April 2018
16:45

| Venezuela | 8–0 | Bolivia |
|---|---|---|
| Castellanos 23', 49', 55', 90+3' (pen.); Viso 63', 65', 89'; Altuve 74' | Report |

Estadio Municipal Francisco Sánchez Rumoroso, Coquimbo
Referee: Claudia Umpiérrez (Uruguay)
9 April 2018
19:00

| Ecuador | 3–6 | Argentina |
|---|---|---|
| Vásquez 20'; Rodríguez 37' (pen.); Fajardo 76' | Report | Banini 2'; Larroquette 8'; Bravo 10'; Jaimes 41'; Bonsegundo 45' (pen.), 85' |

Estadio Municipal Francisco Sánchez Rumoroso, Coquimbo
Referee: María Victoria Daza (Colombia)

11 April 2018
16:45

| Ecuador | 0–1 | Bolivia |
|---|---|---|
| | Report | Morón 68' (pen.) |

Estadio Municipal Francisco Sánchez Rumoroso, Coquimbo
Referee: Zulma Quiñónez (Paraguay)
11 April 2018
19:00

| Brazil | 4–0 | Venezuela |
|---|---|---|
| Mônica 10'; Bia Zaneratto 38', 72'; Marta 82' | Report |

Estadio Municipal Francisco Sánchez Rumoroso, Coquimbo
Referee: Olga Miranda (Paraguay)

13 April 2018
16:45

| Argentina | 2–0 | Venezuela |
|---|---|---|
| Jaimes 44' (pen.); Banini 61' (pen.) | Report |

Estadio Municipal Francisco Sánchez Rumoroso, Coquimbo
Referee: Claudia Umpiérrez (Uruguay)
13 April 2018
19:00

| Bolivia | 0–7 | Brazil |
|---|---|---|
| | Report | Érika 3', 65'; Andressinha 17', 54'; Andressa Alves 41'; Millene 80'; Aline Milene 82' |

Estadio Municipal Francisco Sánchez Rumoroso, Coquimbo
Referee: Elizabeth Tintaya (Peru)

=== Ranking of group third place ===
The overall fifth-placed team in the first stage qualified for the 2019 Pan American Games.

| Pos | Grp | Team | Pld | W | D | L | GF | GA | GD | Pts | Qualification |
|---|---|---|---|---|---|---|---|---|---|---|---|
| 1 | A | Paraguay | 4 | 2 | 1 | 1 | 7 | 7 | 0 | 7 | 2019 Pan American Games |
| 2 | B | Venezuela | 4 | 2 | 0 | 2 | 9 | 6 | +3 | 6 | |

Source: CONMEBOL

== Final stage ==
In the final stage, the teams were ranked according to points (3 points for a win, 1 point for a draw, 0 points for a loss). If tied on points, tiebreakers would be applied in the following order, taking into account only matches in the final stage (Regulations Article 18.2):

1. Goal difference;
2. Goals scored;
3. Head-to-head result in games between tied teams;
4. Fair play points (first yellow card: minus 1 point; second yellow card / red card: minus 3 points; direct red card: minus 4 points; yellow card and direct red card: minus 5 points);
5. Drawing of lots.

| Pos | Team | Pld | W | D | L | GF | GA | GD | Pts | Qualification |
|---|---|---|---|---|---|---|---|---|---|---|
| 1 | Brazil | 3 | 3 | 0 | 0 | 9 | 1 | +8 | 9 | 2019 FIFA Women's World Cup and 2020 Summer Olympics |
| 2 | Chile (H) | 3 | 1 | 1 | 1 | 5 | 3 | +2 | 4 | 2019 FIFA Women's World Cup and Olympic CAF–CONMEBOL play-off |
| 3 | Argentina | 3 | 1 | 0 | 2 | 3 | 8 | −5 | 3 | World Cup CONCACAF–CONMEBOL play-off and 2019 Pan American Games |
| 4 | Colombia | 3 | 0 | 1 | 2 | 1 | 6 | −5 | 1 | 2019 Pan American Games |

Source: CONMEBOL
Rules for classification: Final stage tiebreakers
(H) Hosts
16 April 2018
16:45

| Colombia | 1–3 | Argentina |
|---|---|---|
| Salazar 31' | Report | Bonsegundo 50'; Jaimes 66'; Coronel 70' |

Estadio La Portada, La Serena
Referee: Emikar Calderas (Venezuela)
16 April 2018
19:00

| Brazil | 3–1 | Chile |
|---|---|---|
| Mônica 21'; Bia Zaneratto 25'; Thaís 34' | Report | López 63' |

Estadio La Portada, La Serena
Referee: Olga Miranda (Paraguay)

19 April 2018
16:45

| Brazil | 3–0 | Argentina |
|---|---|---|
| Cristiane 47'; Thaisa 52'; Debinha 78' | Report |

Estadio La Portada, La Serena
Referee: Susana Corella (Ecuador)
19 April 2018
19:00

| Colombia | 0–0 | Chile |
|---|---|---|
| | Report |

Estadio La Portada, La Serena
Referee: Claudia Umpiérrez (Uruguay)

22 April 2018
16:45

| Chile | 4–0 | Argentina |
|---|---|---|
| Sáez 8'; Hernández 24'; Barroso 40' (o.g.); Lara 90+2' | Report |

Estadio La Portada, La Serena
Referee: Emikar Calderas (Venezuela)
22 April 2018
19:00

| Brazil | 3–0 | Colombia |
|---|---|---|
| Mônica 29', 71'; Clavijo 45+2' (o.g.) | Report |

Estadio La Portada, La Serena
Referee: Sirley Cornejo (Bolivia)

== Goalscorers ==
There were 99 goals scored in 26 matches, for an average of 3.81 goals per match.

9 goals

- (Colombia) Catalina Usme

6 goals

- (Brazil) Bia Zaneratto

5 goals

- (Argentina) Sole Jaimes
- (Venezuela) Deyna Castellanos

4 goals

- (Brazil) Cristiane
- (Brazil) Mônica

3 goals

- (Argentina) Estefanía Banini
- (Argentina) Florencia Bonsegundo
- (Brazil) Andressinha
- (Brazil) Debinha
- (Chile) Yanara Aedo
- (Venezuela) Ysaura Viso

2 goals

- (Argentina) Mariana Larroquette
- (Brazil) Érika
- (Chile) Francisca Lara
- (Chile) Yesenia López
- (Chile) María José Rojas
- (Chile) Camila Sáez
- (Colombia) Isabella Echeverri
- (Colombia) Leicy Santos
- (Paraguay) Jessica Martínez
- (Paraguay) Amada Peralta

1 goal

- (Argentina) Ruth Bravo
- (Argentina) Mariela Coronel
- (Bolivia) Janeth Morón
- (Brazil) Aline Milene
- (Brazil) Andressa Alves
- (Brazil) Formiga
- (Brazil) Marta
- (Brazil) Millene
- (Brazil) Rafaelle
- (Brazil) Thaís
- (Brazil) Thaisa
- (Chile) Maryorie Hernández
- (Colombia) Daniela Montoya
- (Colombia) Diana Ospina
- (Colombia) Yoreli Rincón
- (Colombia) Liana Salazar
- (Ecuador) Suany Fajardo
- (Ecuador) Ingrid Rodríguez
- (Ecuador) Erika Vásquez
- (Paraguay) Damia Cortaza
- (Paraguay) Liz Peña
- (Paraguay) Gloria Villamayor
- (Peru) Nahomi Martínez
- (Uruguay) Yamila Badell
- (Uruguay) Sindy Ramírez
- (Venezuela) Oriana Altuve

1 own goal

- (Argentina) Agustina Barroso (against Chile)
- (Colombia) Ángela Clavijo (against Brazil)

== Awards ==
2018 Copa América Femenina winners

Brazil
Seventh title

- Top goalscorer: (Colombia) Catalina Usme (9 goals)
- Fair play award: Chile

== Qualification for international tournaments ==
=== Qualified teams for FIFA Women's World Cup ===
The following three teams from CONMEBOL qualified for the 2019 FIFA Women's World Cup. Argentina qualified by winning the play-off against the 2018 CONCACAF Women's Championship fourth-placed team, Panama.

| Team | Qualified on | Previous appearances in FIFA Women's World Cup^{1} |
|---|---|---|
| Brazil | 19 April 2018 | 7 (1991, 1995, 1999, 2003, 2007, 2011, 2015) |
| Chile | 22 April 2018 | 0 (debut) |
| Argentina | 13 November 2018 | 2 (2003, 2007) |

^{1} Bold indicates champions for that year. Italic indicates hosts for that year.

=== Qualified teams for Summer Olympics ===
The following two teams from CONMEBOL qualified for the 2020 Summer Olympic women's football tournament. Chile qualified after they won the play-off against the 2020 CAF Women's Olympic Qualifying Tournament second-placed team, Cameroon.

| Team | Qualified on | Previous appearances in Summer Olympics^{2} |
|---|---|---|
| Brazil | 22 April 2018 | 6 (1996, 2000, 2004, 2008, 2012, 2016) |
| Chile | 13 April 2021 | 0 (debut) |

^{2} Bold indicates champions for that year. Italic indicates hosts for that year.

=== Qualified teams for Pan American Games ===
The following four teams from CONMEBOL qualified for the 2019 Pan American Games women's football tournament, including Peru which qualified as hosts.

| Team | Qualified on | Previous appearances in Pan American Games^{3} |
|---|---|---|
| Peru | 11 October 2013 | 0 (debut) |
| Paraguay | 13 April 2018 | 1 (2007) |
| Argentina | 22 April 2018 | 4 (2003, 2007, 2011, 2015) |
| Colombia | 22 April 2018 | 2 (2011, 2015) |

^{3} Bold indicates champions for that year. Italic indicates hosts for that year.
