= Estadio Municipal Francisco Sánchez Rumoroso =

Stadium in Coquimbo, Chile

Estadio Francisco Sánchez Rumoroso
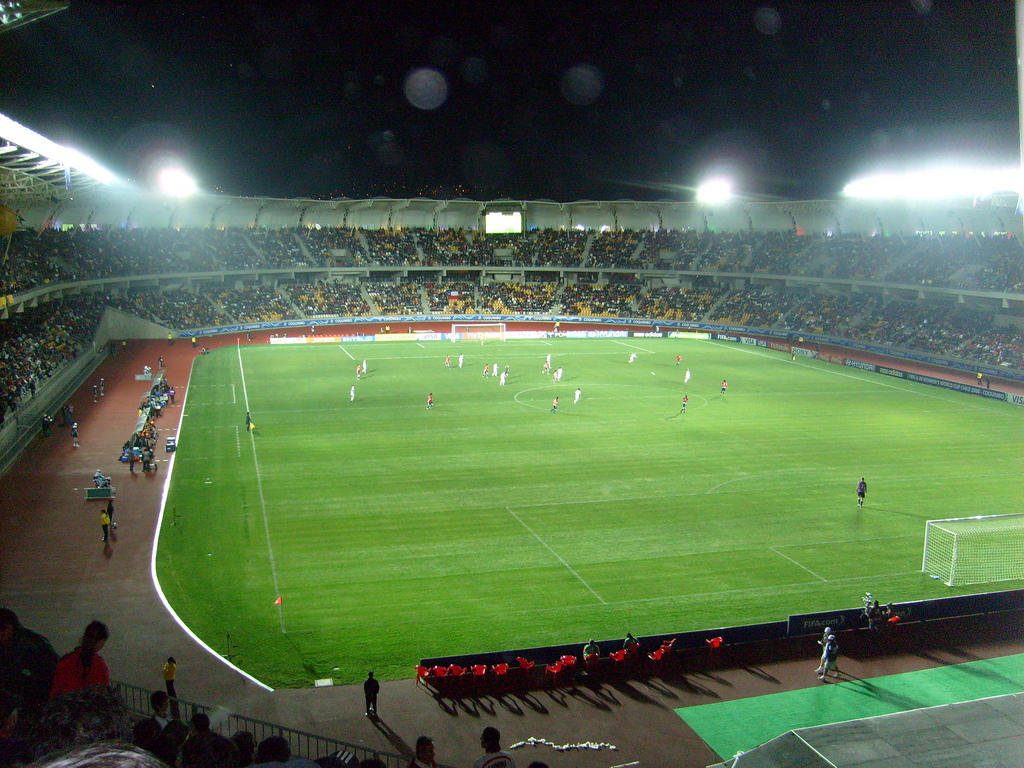
- Interior view of the new stadium
- Interactive map of Estadio Francisco Sánchez Rumoroso
- Location: Coquimbo, Chile
- Coordinates: 29°57′55″S 71°20′18″W
- Owner: Municipality of Coquimbo
- Capacity: 15,809
- Surface: grass
- Field size: 105 x 68 m

Construction
- Opened: January 7, 1970 (original stadium)
- Renovated: November 19, 2008 (renovated stadium)
- Cost: $ 12,247,923,938 (renovation)
- Architect: Montealegre Beach Architects

Tenant
- Coquimbo Unido

Estadio Francisco Sánchez Rumoroso is a multi-purpose stadium in Coquimbo, Chile. Currently, it is mostly used for football matches. It is the home stadium of Coquimbo Unido. The former stadium was inaugurated on July 1, 1970 and hold 18,750 people.

In 2007 the stadium was selected as a venue for the 2008 FIFA U-20 Women's World Cup. In order to comply with FIFA standards, a completely new stadium was built. Its capacity was increased from 15,000 to 18,750. The new stadium has the shape of ship so as to homage Coquimbo's oceanic tradition. The city has been famous due to its port and pirate lore. The stadium was inaugurated on November 9, 2008.

== Gallery ==
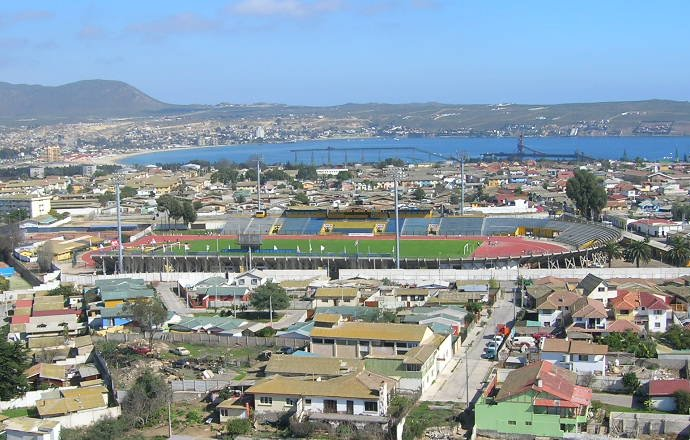
Stadium in 2007, prior to renovation.

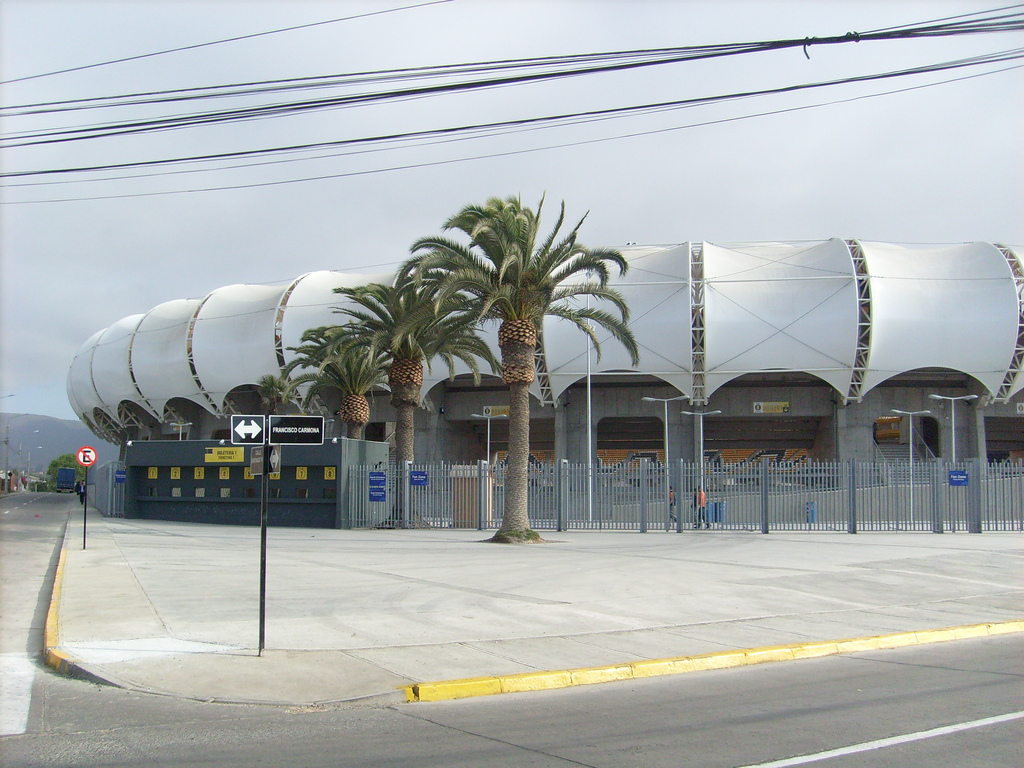
Outside view.

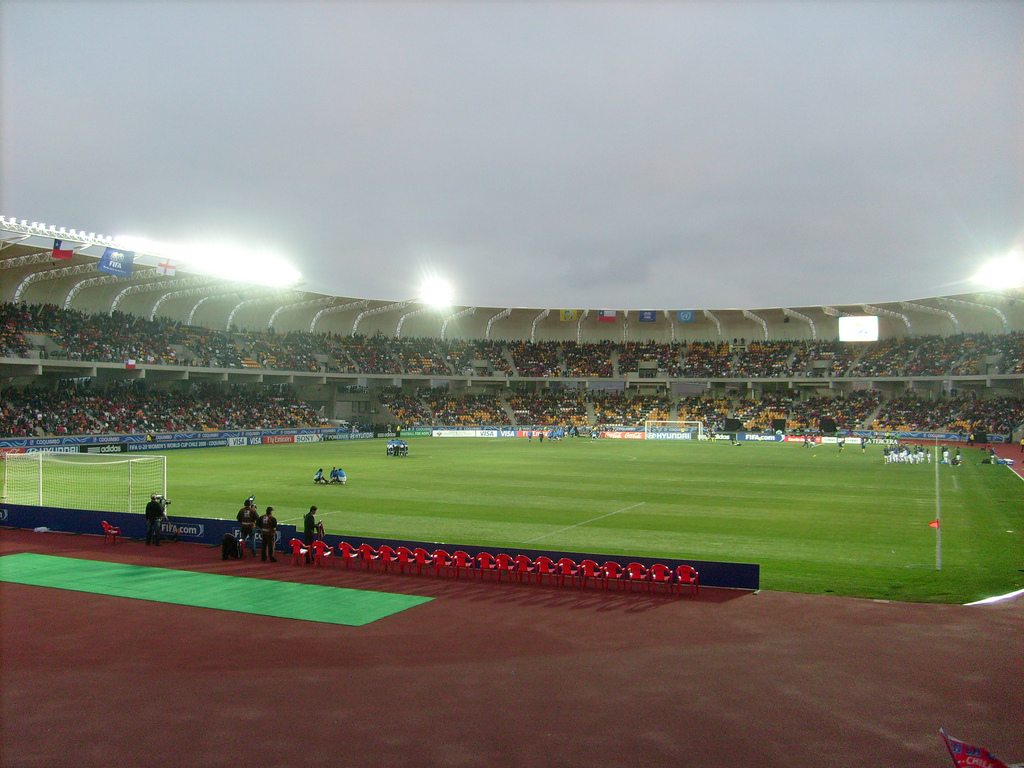
Inside view of the new stadium.
