= Diana Ospina (footballer) =

Colombian footballer (born 1989)

Personal information
- Full name: Diana Carolina Ospina García
- Date of birth: 3 March 1989 (age 37)
- Place of birth: Medellín, Colombia
- Height: 1.58 m (5 ft 2 in)
- Position: Midfielder

Team information
- Current team: América de Cali
- Number: 4

Senior career*
Years	Team	Apps	(Gls)
2010–2016	Formas Íntimas		
2017–2018	Envigado (Note: In partnership with Formas Íntimas.)		
2019–2020	Independiente Medellín		
2021–	América de Cali	53	(3)

International career^{‡}
2011–	Colombia	69	(4)
Medal record
Women's football
Representing Colombia
Copa América Femenina
Runner-up	2014 Ecuador
Runner-up	2022 Colombia
Pan American Games
Gold medal – first place	2019 Lima	Team
- * Club domestic league appearances and goals as of 18 July 2023 ‡ National team caps and goals as of 20 July 2023 (prior the 2023 FIFA Women's World Cup)

Diana Carolina Ospina García (born 3 March 1989) is a Colombian footballer who plays as a midfielder for América de Cali and the Colombia women's national team.

== International career ==
Ospina represented Colombia at the 2011 FIFA Women's World Cup in Germany and the 2015 FIFA Women's World Cup in Canada as well as the football competition at the 2016 Summer Olympics in Brazil.
