= Foz Cataratas FC =

Foz Cataratas Futebol Clube
- Full name: Foz Cataratas
- Nickname: Poderosas do Foz
- Founded: March 2010
- Ground: Estádio Pedro Basso, Foz do Iguaçu, Paraná
- League: Campeonato Brasileiro de Futebol Feminino
Home colors	Away colors

Foz Cataratas Futebol Clube, commonly known as Foz Cataratas, is a Brazilian women's football club, based in the city of Foz do Iguaçu, Paraná state, Brazil. They won the 2011 Copa do Brasil, which was the most important competition of Brazilian women's football at the time, and reached the final of the 2012 Copa Libertadores.

== History ==
The club was founded in March 2010 by the businessman and former football announcer Luciano do Valle, and physical education teacher Aleksandro Foagnoli. Their first game ever was played on March 6 of that year, against Paraguayan team Universidad Autnóma, in Foz do Iguaçu. Foz Cataratas won the Campeonato Paranaense in 2010 and in 2011 and finished in the second position in the 2011 Torneio Internacional Interclubes de Futebol Feminino, when they were defeated by Santos in the final. They won the Copa do Brasil in 2011, after they beat Vitória-PE in the final Foz Cataratas competed in the 2012 Copa Libertadores.

== Honours ==
=== Official tournaments ===
National
Competitions	Titles	Seasons
Copa do Brasil	1	2011
State
Competitions	Titles	Seasons
Campeonato Paranaense	7	2011, 2012, 2013, 2014, 2017, 2018, 2019

- record

== Stadium ==
Foz Cataratas Futebol Clube play their home games at Estádio Pedro Basso.
