= Estudiantes de Guárico =

Venezuelan women's football team

- Nickname: Las Académicas
- Founded: 2001
- Ground: Estadio Alfredo Simonpietri
- Capacity: 1,500
- Manager: (Venezuela) Sin Indumentaria
- League: Superliga Feminina

Estudiantes de Guárico are a Venezuelan women's football team based in Calabozo, Guárico. Founded in 2001, the club has won the Venezuelan women's football championship four times, most recently in 2017, and reached the final of the 2016 Copa Libertadores Femenina.

== History ==
Estudiantes de Guárico have won the Venezuelan women's football championship (known as the Superliga Femenina from 2017 onwards, and as the Primera Division Femenino beforehand) on four occasions (2012/13, 2015, and both the Apertura and Clausura 2017 leagues). In 2016, they reached the Copa Libertadores Femenina final without losing a match in that year's competition. In the final, they lost 2–1 to Sportivo Limpeño of Paraguay.
