= Copa Libertadores Femenina =

CONMEBOL Libertadores Femenina
- Organizer(s): CONMEBOL
- Founded: 2009; 17 years ago
- Region: South America
- Teams: 16 (from 10 associations)
- Related competitions: Copa Libertadores
- Current champion: (Brazil) Cruzeiro (1st title)
- Most championships: (Brazil) Corinthians (6 titles)
- Website: conmebol.com/libfemenina
- 2026 Copa Libertadores Femenina

The CONMEBOL Libertadores Femenina, commonly known as "Copa Libertadores Femenina" (Portuguese: Copa/Taça Libertadores Feminina), is an annual international women's association football club competition in South America. It is organized by the South American Football Confederation (CONMEBOL). The competition started in the 2009 season in response to the increased interest in women's football. It is the only CONMEBOL club competition for women and is the women's version of the Copa Libertadores.

== History ==
The competition was officially announced in March 2009, and it was approved by CONMEBOL's Executive Committee on July 3 of that year. CONMEBOL decided that the competition's first edition would be played in Santos and Guarujá, Brazil from October 3 to October 18, 2009. The competition was organized by CONMEBOL, FPF, CBF and Santos Futebol Clube.

Since 2019, clubs in the men's Libertadores are required to have a women's team: failure to do so leads to rejection of their entry. This change was made in order to strengthen the women's competition.

== Format ==
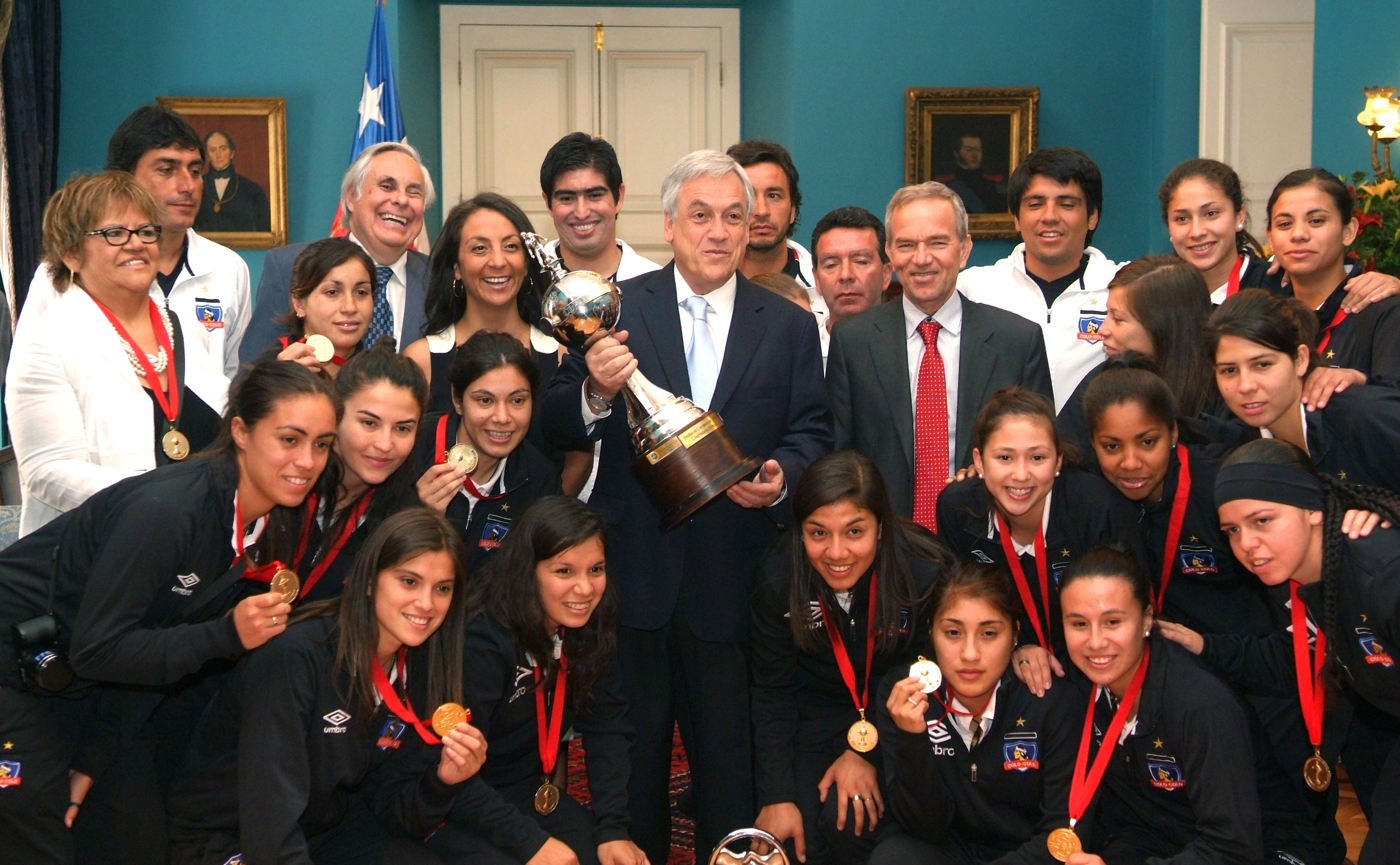
Chile's former president Sebastián Piñera with Colo-Colo (2012), the first non-Brazilian club to win the trophy.

In 2009 and 2010 the tournament was played by ten teams, one from each CONMEBOL country, divided in two groups of five clubs each. The two best-placed teams of each group qualify to play the semifinal and the winners then play the final, while the losers play the third-place game.

From 2011 to 2018 twelve teams played the tournament and were divided into three groups of four. The group winners and best runner-up advanced to the semi-finals.

The 2015 edition was the first to be held outside Brazil. Medellin in Colombia made an official bid, with cities in Paraguay, Chile and again Brazil interested as well. Medellin was then announced as host just before the 2014 edition.

Starting in 2019, the tournament was expanded from 12 to 16 teams.

== Records and statistics ==
=== List of finals ===
Ed.	Year	Host	First place match			Third place match			Num. teams
Ed.	Year	Host	(gold) Champions	Score	(silver) Runners-up	(bronze) Third place	Score	Fourth place	Num. teams
1	2009	Brazil	(Brazil) Santos	9–0	(Paraguay) Universidad Autónoma	(Colombia) Formas Íntimas	2–0	(Chile) Everton	10
2	2010	Brazil	(Brazil) Santos	1–0	(Chile) Everton	(Argentina) Boca Juniors	2–1	(Ecuador) Deportivo Quito	10
3	2011	Brazil	(Brazil) São José	1–0	(Chile) Colo-Colo	(Brazil) Santos	6–0	(Venezuela) Caracas	12
4	2012	Brazil	(Chile) Colo-Colo	0–0 (4–2 p)	(Brazil) Foz Cataratas	(Brazil) São José	1–0	(Brazil) Vitória das Tabocas	12
5	2013	Brazil	(Brazil) São José	3–1	(Colombia) Formas Íntimas	(Chile) Colo-Colo	6–3	(Bolivia) Mundo Futuro	12
6	2014	Brazil	(Brazil) São José	5–1	(Venezuela) Caracas	(Paraguay) Cerro Porteño	0–0 (5–3 p)	(Colombia) Formas Íntimas	12
7	2015	Colombia	(Brazil) Ferroviária	3–1	(Chile) Colo-Colo	(Argentina) UAI Urquiza	1–1 (6–5 p)	(Brazil) São José	12
8	2016	Uruguay	(Paraguay) Sportivo Limpeño	2–1	(Venezuela) Estudiantes de Guárico	(Brazil) Foz Cataratas	0–0 (3–1 p)	(Uruguay) Colón	12
9	2017	Paraguay	(Brazil) Audax/Corinthians	0–0 (5–4 p)	(Chile) Colo-Colo	(Argentina) River Plate	2–1	(Paraguay) Cerro Porteño	12
10	2018	Brazil	(Colombia) Atlético Huila	1–1 (5–3 p)	(Brazil) Santos	(Brazil) Iranduba	1–1 (2–0 p)	(Chile) Colo-Colo	12
11	2019	Ecuador	(Brazil) Corinthians	2–0	(Brazil) Ferroviária	(Colombia) América de Cali	3–1	(Paraguay) Cerro Porteño	16
12	2020	Argentina	(Brazil) Ferroviária	2–1	(Colombia) América de Cali	(Brazil) Corinthians	4–0	Universidad de Chile	16
13	2021	Paraguay Uruguay	(Brazil) Corinthians	2–0	(Colombia) Santa Fe	(Brazil) Ferroviária	1–1 (3–1 p)	(Uruguay) Nacional	16
14	2022	Ecuador	(Brazil) Palmeiras	4–1	(Argentina) Boca Juniors	(Colombia) América de Cali	5–0	(Colombia) Deportivo Cali	16
15	2023	Colombia	(Brazil) Corinthians	1–0	(Brazil) Palmeiras	(Colombia) Atlético Nacional/Formas Íntimas	3–2	(Brazil) Internacional	16
16	2024	Paraguay	(Brazil) Corinthians	2–0	(Colombia) Santa Fe	(Argentina) Boca Juniors	2–0	(Ecuador) Dragonas IDV	16
17	2025	Argentina	(Brazil) Corinthians	0–0 (5–3 p)	(Colombia) Deportivo Cali	(Brazil) Ferroviária	1–0	(Chile) Colo-Colo	16
18	2026	Ecuador	(Brazil) Cruzeiro	4–4 (5–4 p)	(Brazil) Corinthians	(Colombia) Santa Fe	4–3	(Paraguay) Olimpia	16

=== Performances by club ===
Location of winners

Club	Titles	Runners-up	Seasons won	Seasons runner-up
(Brazil) Corinthians (Note: Corinthians won the 2017 title as a partnership with Audax. They created their own team for the 2018 season.)	6	1	2017, 2019, 2021, 2023, 2024, 2025	2026
(Brazil) São José	3	0	2011, 2013, 2014	—
(Brazil) Santos	2	1	2009, 2010	2018
(Brazil) Ferroviária	2	1	2015, 2020	2019
(Chile) Colo-Colo	1	3	2012	2011, 2015, 2017
(Brazil) Palmeiras	1	1	2022	2023
(Paraguay) Sportivo Limpeño	1	0	2016	—
(Colombia) Atlético Huila	1	0	2018	—
(Brazil) Cruzeiro	1	0	2026	—
(Colombia) Santa Fe	0	2	—	2021, 2024
(Paraguay) Universidad Autónoma	0	1	—	2009
(Chile) Everton	0	1	—	2010
(Brazil) Foz Cataratas	0	1	—	2012
(Colombia) Formas Íntimas	0	1	—	2013
(Venezuela) Caracas	0	1	—	2014
(Venezuela) Estudiantes de Guárico	0	1	—	2016
(Colombia) América de Cali	0	1	—	2020
(Argentina) Boca Juniors	0	1	—	2022
(Colombia) Deportivo Cali	0	1	—	2025

=== Performance by nation ===
After the 2026 edition. So far only Peruvian teams have not reached a semi-final.

Nation	Winners	Runners-up	Third	Fourth	Winner	Runners-up	Third place	Fourth place
Brazil	15	5	7	3	Corinthians (6); São José (3); Santos (2); Ferroviária (2); Palmeiras (1); Cruzeiro (1)	Foz Cataratas; Santos; Ferroviária; Palmeiras; Corinthians	Santos; São José; Foz Cataratas; Iranduba; Corinthians; Ferroviária (2)	Vitória das Tabocas; São José; Internacional
Colombia	1	5	5	2	Atlético Huila	Formas Íntimas; América de Cali; Santa Fe (2); Deportivo Cali	Formas Íntimas; América de Cali (2); Atlético Nacional/Formas Íntimas; Santa Fe	Formas Íntimas; Deportivo Cali
Chile	1	4	1	4	Colo-Colo	Colo-Colo (3); Everton	Colo-Colo	Everton; Colo-Colo (2); Universidad de Chile
Paraguay	1	1	1	3	Sportivo Limpeño	Universidad Autónoma	Cerro Porteño	Cerro Porteño (2); Olimpia
Venezuela	—	2	—	1		Caracas; Estudiantes de Guárico		Caracas
Argentina	—	1	4	—		Boca Juniors	Boca Juniors (2); UAI Urquiza; River Plate	
Uruguay	—	—	—	2				Colón; Nacional
Ecuador	—	—	—	2				Deportivo Quito; Dragonas IDV
Bolivia	—	—	—	1				Mundo Futuro

== Top scorers ==
Seven players have won the award twice Cristiane, Gloria Villamayor, Catalina Usme, Maitté Zamorano, Oriana Altuve, Ysaura Viso and Victória. Viso and Victória did it with the same club.

Year	Name	Team	Goals
2009	(Brazil) Cristiane	(Brazil) Santos	15
2010	(Paraguay) Gloria Villamayor	(Chile) Everton	8
2010	(Paraguay) Noelia Cuevas	(Paraguay) Universidad Autónoma	8
2011	(Venezuela) Ysaura Viso	(Venezuela) Caracas	9
2012	(Brazil) Cristiane	(Brazil) São José	7
2013	(Bolivia) Maitté Zamorano	(Bolivia) Mundo Futuro	7
2014	(Colombia) Diana Ospina	(Colombia) Formas Íntimas	6
2014	(Brazil) Andressa Alves	(Brazil) São José	6
2014	(Venezuela) Ysaura Viso	(Venezuela) Caracas	6
2015	(Colombia) Catalina Usme	(Colombia) Formas Íntimas	8
2016	(Venezuela) Oriana Altuve	(Uruguay) Colón	4
2016	(Colombia) Manuela González	(Colombia) Generaciones Palmiranas	4
2017	(Venezuela) Oriana Altuve	(Colombia) Santa Fe	4
2017	(Brazil) Amanda Brunner	(Brazil) Audax/Corinthians	4
2017	(Uruguay) Carolina Birizamberri	(Argentina) River Plate	4
2017	(Colombia) Catalina Usme	(Colombia) Santa Fe	4
2017	(Paraguay) Gloria Villamayor	(Chile) Colo-Colo	4
2017	(Bolivia) Maitté Zamorano	(Bolivia) Deportivo ITA	4
2018	(Brazil) Brena	(Brazil) Santos	4
2019	(Brazil) Nathane	(Brazil) Ferroviária	9
2020	(Brazil) Gabi Nunes	(Brazil) Corinthians	7
2020	(Brazil) Grazi	(Brazil) Corinthians	7
2020	(Brazil) Victória	(Brazil) Corinthians	7
2021	(Colombia) Tatiana Ariza	(Colombia) Deportivo Cali	4
2021	(Colombia) Linda Caicedo	(Colombia) Deportivo Cali	4
2021	(Brazil) Jheniffer	(Brazil) Corinthians	4
2021	(Brazil) Victória	(Brazil) Corinthians	4
2021	(Uruguay) Esperanza Pizarro	(Uruguay) Nacional	4
2022	(Paraguay) Rebeca Fernández	Universidad de Chile	5
2023	(Brazil) Priscila	(Brazil) Internacional	8
2024	(Brazil) Gabi Zanotti	(Brazil) Corinthians	5
2025	(Brazil) Gabi Zanotti	(Brazil) Corinthians	6
2026	(Brazil) Victória	(Brazil) Corinthians	6
2026	(Colombia) Mariana Zamorano	(Colombia) Santa Fe	6
2026	(Brazil) Byanca Brasil	(Brazil) Cruzeiro	6

== See also ==
- FIFA Women's Club World Cup
  - AFC Women's Champions League
  - CAF Women's Champions League
  - CONCACAF W Champions Cup
  - UEFA Women's Champions League
  - OFC Women's Champions League
