= Club Sportivo Limpeño =

Paraguayan football club

Sportivo Limpeño
- Full name: Club Sportivo Limpeño
- Founded: 16 July 1914
- Ground: Estadio Optaciano Gómez Rivas, Limpio
- Capacity: 1,800
- Chairman: Ramón Gómez Verlangieri
- Manager: Juan Benito Gonzalez
- League: Primera B Metropolitana
- 2023: 10th
Home colours

Club Sportivo Limpeño is a Paraguayan football club based in Limpio that currently plays in Primera División B Metropolitana.

== History ==
Despite being founded in 1914, Sportivo Limpeño only joined the Paraguayan Football Association in 2013, being formerly affiliated with the UFI. The club had a successful debut, winning the Primera División C. After four seasons, the club was relegated back to Primera C, but achieved promotion by finishing as runners-up and will play again in the Primera B.

== Women's team ==
Sportivo Limpeño has become more known because of its women's team, which participates in the Paraguayan women's championship since 2009. It finished as runners-up in 2014 and won the title in 2015 and 2016. The club also won the Copa Libertadores Femenina in 2016.

Since 2018 the club is in cooperation with Libertad and competing as Libertad/Limpeño.

== Honours ==
=== Men's team ===
- Primera División C
  - 2013

=== Women's team ===
- Copa Libertadores Femenina
  - 2016
- Campeonato Paraguayo
  - 2015, 2016
