= 2014 Copa América Femenina squads =

This article describes about the squads for the 2014 Copa América Femenina.

== Group A ==
=== Colombia ===
The squad was announced on 8 September 2014.

Head coach: Fabián Taborda

No.	Pos.	Player	Date of birth (age)	Caps	Club
1	GK	Paula Forero	25 January 1992 (aged 22)		(United States) Barry University
2	DF	Fátima Montaño	2 October 1984 (aged 29)		(Colombia) Liga Vallecaucana
3	DF	Natalia Gaitán	3 April 1991 (aged 23)		(United States) Houston Aces
4	MF	Diana Ospina (c)	3 March 1989 (aged 25)		(Colombia) Formas Íntimas
5	DF	Melissa Ortiz	24 January 1990 (aged 24)		(United States) Boston Breakers
6	MF	Daniela Montoya	22 August 1990 (aged 24)		(Colombia) Formas Íntimas
7	MF	Catalina Usme	25 December 1989 (aged 24)		(Colombia) Independiente Medellín
8	FW	Ingrid Vidal	27 March 1986 (aged 28)		(Colombia) CD Palmiranas
9	FW	Oriánica Velásquez	1 August 1989 (aged 25)		(United States) Houston Aces
10	MF	Yoreli Rincón	27 July 1993 (aged 21)		(United States) New York Flash
11	MF	Isabella Echeverri	16 June 1994 (aged 20)		(United States) Toledo Rockets
12	GK	Sandra Sepúlveda	3 March 1988 (aged 26)		(Colombia) Formas Íntimas
13	DF	Ángela Clavijo	1 September 1993 (aged 21)		(Colombia) Club La Real
14	DF	Nataly Arias	2 April 1986 (aged 28)		(United States) Atlanta Silver Backs
15	FW	Tatiana Ariza	21 February 1991 (aged 23)		(United States) Houston Aces
16	FW	Lady Andrade	10 January 1992 (aged 22)		(Colombia) Formas Íntimas
17	DF	Carolina Arias	2 September 1990 (aged 24)		(Colombia) CD Palmiranas
18	FW	Katerin Castro	21 November 1991 (aged 22)		(Sweden) Alnö IF
19	MF	Leicy Santos	16 May 1996 (aged 18)		(Colombia) Club Besser
20	FW	Laura Cosme	5 March 1992 (aged 22)		(Colombia) Liga Vallecaucana
21	MF	Mildrey Pineda	1 October 1989 (aged 24)		(Colombia) Liga Vallecaucana
22	GK	Yineth Varón	23 June 1982 (aged 32)		(Colombia) CD Palmiranas

=== Ecuador ===
Head coach: Vanessa Arauz

No.	Pos.	Player	Date of birth (age)	Caps	Club
1	GK	Shirley Berruz	6 January 1991 (aged 23)		(Ecuador) Rocafuerte
2	DF	Katherine Ortíz	16 February 1991 (aged 23)		(Ecuador) Rocafuerte
3	DF	Nancy Aguilar	6 July 1985 (aged 29)		(Ecuador) 7 de Febrero
4	DF	Merly Zambrano	7 December 1981 (aged 32)		(Ecuador) Espuce
5	MF	Mayra Olivera	22 August 1992 (aged 22)		(Ecuador) 7 de Febrero
6	MF	Angie Ponce	14 July 1996 (aged 18)		(Ecuador) Rocafuerte
7	MF	Ingrid Rodríguez	24 November 1991 (aged 22)		(Ecuador) Rocafuerte
8	FW	Erika Vásquez (c)	4 August 1992 (aged 22)		(Ecuador) Rocafuerte
9	FW	Giannina Lattanzio	19 May 1993 (aged 21)		(Ecuador) Rocafuerte
10	FW	Ámbar Torres	21 December 1994 (aged 19)		(Ecuador) Rocafuerte
11	FW	Carina Caicedo	23 July 1987 (aged 27)		(Ecuador) Quito
12	GK	Andrea Vera	10 April 1993 (aged 21)		(Ecuador) San Francisco
13	MF	Mayta Vásconez	4 June 1990 (aged 24)		(Ecuador) Carneras Ups
14	MF	Inés Jhonson	10 December 1989 (aged 24)		(Ecuador) Rocafuerte
15	MF	Sofía Carchipulla	3 February 1990 (aged 24)		(Ecuador) San Francisco
16	DF	Ligia Moreira	19 March 1992 (aged 22)		(Ecuador) Rocafuerte
17	DF	Tamara Angulo	11 February 1998 (aged 16)		(Ecuador) Unión Española
18	MF	Adriana Barré	4 April 1995 (aged 19)		(Ecuador) Quito
19	MF	Kerlly Real	7 November 1998 (aged 15)		(Ecuador) Quito
20	FW	Denise Pesantes	14 January 1988 (aged 26)		(Ecuador) Rocafuerte
21	DF	Iliana Bowen	29 August 1994 (aged 20)		(Ecuador) Rocafuerte
22	GK	Génesis Casierra	21 October 1997 (aged 16)		(Ecuador) 7 de Febrero

=== Peru ===
The squad was announced on 10 September 2014.

Head coach: Marta Tejedor

No.	Pos.	Player	Date of birth (age)	Caps	Club
1	GK	Sharol Taboada	5 November 1994 (aged 19)		
2	MF	Scarleth Flores	12 August 1996 (aged 18)		
3	DF	Karla Conga	23 January 1994 (aged 20)		
4	DF	Paula Pacheco (c)	30 April 1993 (aged 21)		
5	DF	Milagros Arruela	11 October 1992 (aged 21)		
6	DF	Carmen Quesada	12 March 1996 (aged 18)		
7	MF	Amparo Chuquival	21 February 1992 (aged 22)		
8	MF	Sofía Pérez	25 January 1993 (aged 21)		
9	FW	Xioczana Canales	21 April 1999 (aged 15)		
10	MF	Geraldine Cisneros	14 January 1996 (aged 18)		
11	MF	Nahomi Martínez	5 April 1997 (aged 17)		
12	GK	Maryory Sánchez	7 April 1997 (aged 17)		
13	MF	María Cáceres	11 June 1996 (aged 18)		
14	MF	Alejandra Ramos	1 July 1996 (aged 18)		(United States) Walter Johnson High School
15	MF	Melissa Díaz	26 October 1983 (aged 30)		(Spain) Vallecas
16	DF	Yoselin Miranda	14 December 1994 (aged 19)		
17	DF	Aranxa Vega	26 August 1997 (aged 17)		
18	FW	Dharet Vallenas	11 October 1991 (aged 22)		
19	FW	Lyana Chirinos	21 June 1992 (aged 22)		(United States) Lindsey Wilson Blue Raiders
20	MF	Emily Flores	10 September 1990 (aged 24)		
21	GK	Piareli Valdivia	5 October 1991 (aged 22)		
22	DF	Cindy Novoa	10 August 1995 (aged 19)		

=== Uruguay ===
The squad was announced on 9 September 2014.

Head coach: Fabiana Manzolillo

No.	Pos.	Player	Date of birth (age)	Caps	Club
1	GK	Luciana Gómez	22 September 1984 (aged 29)		(Uruguay) Nacional
2	DF	Carina Felipe	3 March 1998 (aged 16)		(Uruguay) Nacional
3	DF	Yanina Fernández	19 April 1994 (aged 20)		(Uruguay) Vida Nueva
4	DF	Stephanie Lacoste	9 September 1996 (aged 18)		(Uruguay) River Plate
5	MF	Cecilia Domeniguini	22 September 1991 (aged 22)		(Uruguay) Colón
6	MF	Lorena González	24 April 1989 (aged 25)		(Uruguay) Colón
7	MF	Yesica Hernández	16 September 1988 (aged 25)		(Uruguay) Cerro
8	MF	Mariana Pion	19 December 1992 (aged 21)		(Uruguay) Colón
9	MF	Pamela González	28 September 1995 (aged 18)		(Uruguay) Colón
10	MF	Lourdes Viana	10 February 1990 (aged 24)		(Uruguay) Cerro
11	FW	Yamila Badell	1 March 1996 (aged 18)		(Uruguay) Colón
12	GK	María Lucía Martínez	1 August 1996 (aged 18)		(Uruguay) Colón
13	MF	Federica Silvera	13 February 1993 (aged 21)		(Uruguay) Nacional
14	DF	Valeria Colman (captain)	25 May 1990 (aged 24)		(Uruguay) Nacional
15	FW	Edrit Viana	12 January 1996 (aged 18)		(Uruguay) River Plate
16	FW	Carolina Birizamberri	9 July 1995 (aged 19)		(Uruguay) Bella Vista
17	DF	Sabrina Soravilla	25 August 1996 (aged 18)		(Uruguay) Nacional
18	FW	Adriana Castillo	5 May 1990 (aged 24)		(Uruguay) Cerro
19	MF	Giovanna Yun	18 July 1992 (aged 22)		(Uruguay) River Plate
20	MF	Aída Camaño (c)	7 May 1984 (aged 30)		(Uruguay) Arachanas Melo
21	GK	Mariángeles Caraballo	5 June 1997 (aged 17)		(Uruguay) Racing
22	DF	María José Rodríguez	4 January 1988 (aged 26)		(Uruguay) Colón

=== Venezuela ===
The squad was announced on 10 September 2014.

Head coach: Kenneth Zseremeta

No.	Pos.	Player	Date of birth (age)	Caps	Club
1	GK	Maleike Pacheco	20 October 1993 (aged 20)		(Venezuela) UCV
2	DF	Petra Cabrera	19 May 1990 (aged 24)		(Venezuela) Trujillanos FC
3	DF	Claudia Rodríguez	2 May 1995 (aged 19)		(Venezuela) Cachimbos FC
4	DF	María Peraza	17 January 1994 (aged 20)		(Venezuela) Caracas FC
5	MF	Milagros Mendoza	11 December 1987 (aged 26)		(Venezuela) Estudiantes de Guárico
6	DF	Soleidys Rengel	3 December 1993 (aged 20)		(Venezuela) Deportivo Anzoátegui
7	MF	Daniuska Rodríguez	4 January 1999 (aged 15)		(Venezuela) Seca Sports
8	MF	Marialba Zambrano	17 June 1995 (aged 19)		(Mexico) Dragonas Oriente
9	FW	Deyna Castellanos	18 April 1999 (aged 15)		(Venezuela) Escuela Juan Arango
10	MF	Lourdes Moreno	25 January 1997 (aged 17)		(Venezuela) Potras FC
11	FW	Gabriela García	2 April 1997 (aged 17)		(Venezuela) Asociación Sucre
12	GK	Franyely Rodríguez	21 September 1997 (aged 16)		(Venezuela) Sport Valencia
13	GK	Migdiel Gutiérrez	15 January 1995 (aged 19)		(Venezuela) Máximo Viloria
14	MF	Nubiluz Rangel	13 August 1993 (aged 21)		(Venezuela) Independiente La Fría
15	MF	Karla Torres	4 June 1992 (aged 22)		(Venezuela) UCV
16	MF	Idalys Pérez	20 July 1996 (aged 18)		(Venezuela) Atlético Yara
17	MF	Yenifer Giménez	3 May 1996 (aged 18)		(Venezuela) Máximo Viloria
18	MF	Yusmery Ascanio	20 December 1990 (aged 23)		(Chile) Colo-Colo
19	FW	Carla Carvalho			(Venezuela) Universidad Bello
20	DF	Neidy Romero	14 February 1995 (aged 19)		(Venezuela) UCV
21	MF	Leury Basanta	7 April 1993 (aged 21)		(Venezuela) Deportivo Anzoátegui
22	DF	Tahicelis Marcano	12 April 1997 (aged 17)		(Venezuela) Deportivo Anzoátegui

== Group B ==
=== Argentina ===
The squad was announced on 8 September 2014.

Head coach: Luis Nicosia

No.	Pos.	Player	Date of birth (age)	Caps	Club
1	GK	Elisabeth Minnig	6 January 1987 (aged 27)		(Argentina) Boca Juniors
2	DF	Florencia Quiñones	26 August 1986 (aged 28)		(Argentina) San Lorenzo
3	DF	Noelia Espíndola	6 April 1992 (aged 22)		(Argentina) San Lorenzo
4	DF	Agustina Barroso	20 May 1993 (aged 21)		(Argentina) UAI Urquiza
5	MF	Fabiana Vallejos (c)	30 July 1985 (aged 29)		(Argentina) Boca Juniors
6	DF	Adriana Sachs	25 December 1993 (aged 20)		(Argentina) Huracán
7	MF	Vanesa Santana	3 September 1990 (aged 24)		(Argentina) Boca Juniors
8	FW	Mariana Larroquette	24 October 1992 (aged 21)		(Argentina) River Plate
9	FW	Sole Jaimes	20 January 1989 (aged 25)		(Brazil) Foz Cataratas
10	FW	Estefanía Banini	21 June 1990 (aged 24)		(Chile) Colo-Colo
11	MF	Florencia Bonsegundo	14 July 1993 (aged 21)		(Argentina) UAI Urquiza
12	GK	Camila Roma	9 January 1994 (aged 20)		(Argentina) Boca Juniors
13	MF	Camila Gómez Ares	26 October 1994 (aged 19)		(Argentina) Boca Juniors
14	MF	Mercedes Pereyra	7 May 1987 (aged 27)		(Argentina) River Plate
15	FW	Yael Oviedo	22 May 1992 (aged 22)		(Brazil) Foz Cataratas
16	DF	Cecilia Ghigo	16 January 1995 (aged 19)		(Argentina) Boca Juniors
17	DF	Aldana Cometti	3 March 1996 (aged 18)		(Argentina) Boca Juniors
18	MF	Micaela Cabrera	18 July 1997 (aged 17)		(Argentina) San Lorenzo
19	MF	Johanna Chamorro	27 April 1992 (aged 22)		(Argentina) Huracán
20	FW	Marianela Szymanowski	27 March 1986 (aged 28)		(Spain) Rayo Vallecano
21	MF	Karen Vénica	25 January 1992 (aged 22)		(Argentina) UAI Urquiza
22	GK	Laurina Oliveros	10 September 1993 (aged 21)		(Argentina) UAI Urquiza

=== Bolivia ===
Head coach: Marco Sandy

No.	Pos.	Player	Date of birth (age)	Caps	Club
1	GK	Blanca Aliaga	3 February 1995 (aged 19)		
2	DF	Alejandra Montaño	7 April 1987 (aged 27)		
3	DF	Helen Maolo	23 December 1988 (aged 25)		
4	MF	Ana Huanca	20 October 1986 (aged 27)		
5	DF	Ericka Morales	17 December 1994 (aged 19)		
6	MF	Ana Paula Rojas	17 July 1997 (aged 17)		
7	FW	Shirley Pérez	16 July 1979 (aged 35)		
8	MF	Virginia Ballesteros	25 September 1988 (aged 25)		
9	FW	Carla Méndez	30 January 1997 (aged 17)		
10	FW	Janeth Morón (C)	2 June 1988 (aged 26)		
11	FW	Eduarda Cuiza	5 January 1980 (aged 34)		
12	GK	Nataly Méndez	13 October 1987 (aged 26)		
13	DF	Griselda Álvarez	21 June 1982 (aged 32)		
14	DF	Gisela Arnez	3 December 1993 (aged 20)		
15	MF	Neiza Flores	19 December 1989 (aged 24)		
16	MF	Sonia Torihuano	28 November 1991 (aged 22)		
17	MF	Ángela Cárdenas	19 November 1993 (aged 20)		
18	MF	Kely Alonzo	29 September 1995 (aged 18)		
19	MF	Elva Espinoza	28 October 1984 (aged 29)		
20	FW	Ana María Rivera	23 October 1993 (aged 20)		
21	DF	Claudia Galvis	3 June 1990 (aged 24)		
22	GK	Zaida Cerezo	3 February 1995 (aged 19)		

=== Brazil ===
The squad was announced on 7 August 2014.

Head coach: Vadão

No.	Pos.	Player	Date of birth (age)	Caps	Club
1	GK	Luciana	24 July 1987 (aged 27)		(Brazil) Ferroviária
2	DF	Fabiana	4 August 1989 (aged 25)		(Brazil) Centro Olímpico
3	DF	Bruna Soares (c)	16 October 1985 (aged 28)		(Brazil) São José
4	DF	Tayla	9 May 1992 (aged 22)		(Brazil) Ferroviária
5	MF	Formiga	3 March 1978 (aged 36)		(Brazil) São José
6	DF	Rilany	26 June 1986 (aged 28)		(Brazil) Ferroviária
7	MF	Maurine	9 June 1985 (aged 29)		(Brazil) Ferroviária
8	MF	Thaisa	17 December 1988 (aged 25)		(Brazil) Ferroviária
9	FW	Chu	27 February 1990 (aged 24)		(Brazil) São José
10	MF	Andressa Alves da Silva	10 November 1992 (aged 21)		(Brazil) São José
11	FW	Cristiane	15 May 1985 (aged 29)		(Brazil) Centro Olímpico
12	GK	Thaís Picarte	22 July 1982 (aged 32)		(Brazil) Centro Olímpico
13	DF	Poliana	6 February 1991 (aged 23)		(Brazil) São José
14	DF	Calan	8 March 1988 (aged 26)		(Brazil) Centro Olímpico
15	DF	Mônica	21 April 1987 (aged 27)		(Brazil) Ferroviária
16	DF	Tamires	10 October 1987 (aged 26)		(Brazil) Centro Olímpico
17	MF	Bia	7 October 1985 (aged 28)		(Brazil) Ferroviária
18	MF	Andressa Machry	1 May 1995 (aged 19)		(Brazil) Kindermann
19	FW	Darlene	11 January 1990 (aged 24)		(Brazil) Rio Preto
20	FW	Giovânia	31 October 1985 (aged 28)		(Brazil) São José
21	MF	Raquel	9 June 1985 (aged 29)		(Brazil) Ferroviária
22	GK	Andréia Suntaque	14 September 1977 (aged 36)		(Brazil) Portuguesa

=== Chile ===
The squad was announced on 21 August 2014.

Head coach: Ronnie Radonich

No.	Pos.	Player	Date of birth (age)	Caps	Club
1	GK	Christiane Endler (c)	23 July 1991 (aged 23)		(England) Chelsea
2	DF	Bárbara Muñoz	2 January 1992 (aged 22)		(Chile) Audax Italiano
3	DF	Carla Guerrero	23 December 1987 (aged 26)		(Chile) Colo-Colo
4	DF	Francisca Lara	29 July 1990 (aged 24)		(Chile) Colo-Colo
5	DF	Leticia Torres	30 May 1994 (aged 20)		(United States) Univ. of San Francisco
6	MF	Yorky Arriagada	31 May 1993 (aged 21)		(Chile) Audax Italiano
7	DF	Loreto Rojas	6 June 1992 (aged 22)		(Chile) Audax Italiano
8	MF	Karen Araya	16 October 1990 (aged 23)		(Chile) Santiago Morning
9	FW	Francisca Moroso	20 March 1993 (aged 21)		(Chile) Colo-Colo
10	MF	Yanara Aedo	5 August 1993 (aged 21)		(Chile) Colo-Colo
11	FW	Fernanda Araya	12 October 1994 (aged 19)		Universidad de Chile
12	GK	Fernanda Cárdenas	12 June 1997 (aged 17)		(Chile) Colo-Colo
13	DF	Tatiana Pérez	23 October 1988 (aged 25)		(Chile) Santiago Morning
14	MF	Daniela Pardo	9 May 1988 (aged 26)		(Chile) santiago Morning
15	FW	Daniela Zamora	13 November 1990 (aged 23)		Universidad de Chile
16	MF	Maryorie Hernández	20 March 1990 (aged 24)		(Chile) Palestino
17	MF	Fernanda Pinilla	11 June 1993 (aged 21)		(Chile) Audax Italiano
18	DF	Camila Sáez	17 October 1994 (aged 19)		(Chile) Colo-Colo
19	MF	Yessenia Huenteo	30 October 1992 (aged 21)		(Chile) Colo-Colo
20	DF	Su Helen Galaz	27 May 1991 (aged 23)		(Chile) Santiago Morning
21	MF	Melisa Rodríguez	21 February 1995 (aged 19)		(Chile) Colo-Colo
22	GK	Natalia Campos	12 January 1992 (aged 22)		(Chile) Universidad Católica

=== Paraguay ===
The squad was announced on 9 September 2014.

Head coach: Julio Gómez

No.	Pos.	Player	Date of birth (age)	Caps	Club
1	GK	Gloria Saleb	12 June 1991 (aged 23)		
2	DF	Jennifer Mora	11 November 1996 (aged 17)		
3	DF	Tania Riso	26 January 1994 (aged 20)		
4	DF	Rebeca Romero	11 May 1989 (aged 25)		
5	DF	Verónica Riveros (c)	23 April 1987 (aged 27)		
6	MF	Jacqueline González	2 October 1991 (aged 22)		
7	MF	Angélica Vázquez	14 December 1990 (aged 23)		
8	MF	Lourdes Ortiz	1 July 1987 (aged 27)		
9	MF	Dulce Quintana	6 February 1989 (aged 25)		
10	FW	Ana Fleitas	8 August 1992 (aged 22)		
11	FW	Fany Gauto	19 August 1992 (aged 22)		
12	GK	Cristina Recalde	29 September 1994 (aged 19)		
13	DF	Sady Salinas	27 October 1994 (aged 19)		
14	DF	Belén Benítez	18 December 1995 (aged 18)		
15	MF	Fanny Godoy	21 January 1998 (aged 16)		
16	MF	Mercedes Núñez	29 July 1986 (aged 28)		
17	DF	Natalia Gonzales	31 December 1989 (aged 24)		
18	FW	Rebeca Fernández	1 December 1991 (aged 22)		
19	FW	Jessica Martínez	14 June 1999 (aged 15)		
20	DF	Jessica Santacruz	22 January 1990 (aged 24)		
21	FW	Liza Larrea	7 November 1992 (aged 21)		
22	GK	Alicia Bobadilla	5 June 1994 (aged 20)		
