= 2010 South American Women's Football Championship squads =

The 2010 South American Women's Football Championship squads consisted of 20 players (2 goalkeepers and 18 outfield players) per team.

== Group A ==
=== Argentina ===
Head coach: Carlos Borrello.

No.	Pos.	Player	Date of birth (age)	Caps	Club
	GK	Elisabeth Minnig	6 January 1987 (aged 23)		Unattached
	DF	Gabriela Chávez	9 April 1989 (aged 21)		(Argentina) Boca Juniors
	DF	Eva González	2 September 1987 (aged 23)		(Argentina) Boca Juniors
	DF	Catalina Pérez	16 February 1989 (aged 21)		(Argentina) River Plate
	DF	Florencia Quiñones	26 August 1986 (aged 24)		(Argentina) San Lorenzo
	MF	Estefanía Banini	21 June 1990 (aged 20)		Unattached
	MF	Gimena Blanco	5 December 1987 (aged 22)		(Italy) Gruppo Sportivo ISEF
	MF	Mariela Coronel	20 June 1981 (aged 29)		(Spain) Prainsa Zaragoza
	MF	Marisa Gerez	3 November 1976 (aged 34)		(Argentina) Boca Juniors
	MF	Analía Hirmbruchner	10 January 1989 (aged 21)		(Argentina) UAI Urquiza
	MF	Mercedes Pereyra	7 May 1987 (aged 23)		(Argentina) River Plate
	MF	Fabiana Vallejos	30 July 1985 (aged 25)		(Argentina) Boca Juniors
	FW	Analía Almeida	19 August 1985 (aged 25)		(Argentina) San Lorenzo
	FW	Ludmila Manicler	6 July 1987 (aged 23)		(Argentina) Independiente
	FW	Andrea Ojeda	17 January 1985 (aged 25)		(Argentina) Boca Juniors
	FW	Amancay Urbani	7 December 1991 (aged 18)		Unattached

=== Bolivia ===
Head coach: Napoleón Cardozo.

No.	Pos.	Player	Date of birth (age)	Caps	Club
	GK	Paola Álvarez	10 September 1990 (aged 20)		
	GK	Lizeth Velasco			
	DF	Griselda Álvarez	21 June 1982 (aged 28)		
	DF	Guadalupe Chinchilla			
	DF	Claudia Galvis	3 June 1990 (aged 20)		
	DF	María Laura Gómez	16 May 1993 (aged 17)		
	DF	Ana Huanca	20 October 1986 (aged 24)		
	DF	Alejandra Montaño	7 April 1987 (aged 23)		
	DF	Mariela Moreira	24 March 1983 (aged 27)		
	MF	Roxana Benavídez	1 September 1987 (aged 23)		
	MF	Ángela Cárdenas	19 November 1993 (aged 17)		
	MF	Carla Padilla	9 May 1988 (aged 22)		
	MF	Roymi Revuelta			
	MF	Luzdana Rivera			
	MF	Rosa Soliz			
	MF	Diana Zenteno	6 January 1993 (aged 17)		
	FW	Palmira Loayza	19 November 1993 (aged 17)		
	FW	Shirley Pérez	<16 July 1979 (aged 31)		

=== Chile ===
Head coach: (Spain) Marta Tejedor

The final 20-player squad was announced on 20 October 2010.

No.	Pos.	Player	Date of birth (age)	Caps	Club
	GK	Natalia Campos	12 January 1992 (aged 18)		(Chile) Universidad Católica
	GK	Christiane Endler	23 July 1991 (aged 19)		(Chile) Everton
	DF	Marcela Cortés	5 September 1983 (aged 27)		(Chile) Colo-Colo
	DF	Su Helen Galaz	27 May 1991 (aged 19)		(Chile) Everton
	DF	Javiera Guajardo	26 September 1989 (aged 21)		Universidad de Chile
	DF	Carla Guerrero	23 December 1987 (aged 22)		(Chile) Colo-Colo
	DF	Geraldine Leyton	11 May 1989 (aged 21)		(Chile) Colo-Colo
	DF	Juanita Peña	25 August 1989 (aged 21)		(Chile) Colo-Colo
	DF	Tatiana Pérez	23 October 1988 (aged 22)		(Chile) Santiago Morning
	MF	Yanara Aedo	5 August 1993 (aged 17)		(Chile) Colo-Colo
	MF	Karen Araya	16 October 1990 (aged 20)		(Chile) Colo-Colo
	MF	Alexandra Benado	11 May 1976 (aged 34)		(Chile) Provincial Osorno
	MF	Jennifer Díaz	22 May 1988 (aged 22)		(Chile) Colo-Colo
	MF	Francisca Lara	29 July 1990 (aged 20)		(Chile) Coquimbo Unido
	MF	Francisca Mardones	24 March 1989 (aged 21)		(Chile) Colo-Colo
	MF	Daniela Pardo	9 May 1988 (aged 22)		(Chile) Everton
	FW	Yessenia Huenteo	30 October 1992 (aged 18)		(Chile) Audax Italiano
	FW	Nathalie Quezada	21 June 1989 (aged 21)		(Chile) Colo-Colo
	FW	Janet Salgado	24 March 1986 (aged 24)		(Chile) Coquimbo Unido
	FW	Daniela Zamora	13 November 1990 (aged 20)		(Chile) Universidad Católica

=== Ecuador ===
Head coach: Juan Carlos Cerón.

No.	Pos.	Player	Date of birth (age)	Caps	Club
1	GK	Irene Tobar	5 May 1989 (aged 21)		(Ecuador) Guayas selection
2	MF	Ingrid Rodríguez	24 November 1991 (aged 18)		(Ecuador) Deportivo Quito
3	DF	Ligia Moreira	19 March 1992 (aged 18)		(Ecuador) Deportivo Quito
4	DF	Lorena Aguilar	6 July 1985 (aged 25)		(Ecuador) Los Rios selection
5	MF	Mayra Olvera	22 August 1992 (aged 18)		(Ecuador) Pichincha selection
6	FW	Erika Vásquez	4 August 1992 (aged 18)		(Ecuador) Guayas selection
7	MF	Sonia Ferrín	19 December 1990 (aged 19)		
8	FW	Joshelyn Sánchez	16 July 1992 (aged 18)		(Ecuador) Espuce
9	DF	Katherine Ortiz	16 February 1991 (aged 19)		(Ecuador) Guayas selection
10	MF	Patricia Freire	28 August 1984 (aged 26)		(Ecuador) Deportivo Quito
11	FW	Mónica Quinteros	5 July 1988 (aged 22)		(Ecuador) Deportivo Quito
12	GK	Shirley Berruz	6 January 1991 (aged 19)		(Ecuador) Pichincha selection
13	DF	Andrea Vásquez			
14	DF	Rocío Mora	25 December 1989 (aged 20)		
15	MF	Mariana Espinosa	13 November 1984 (aged 26)		
16	DF	Vanessa Herrera	10 March 1987 (aged 23)		
17	FW	Johanna Solís	8 May 1991 (aged 19)		
18	MF	Valeria Palacios	16 February 1991 (aged 19)		(Ecuador) Pichincha selection

=== Peru ===
Head coach: Jaime Duarte.

No.	Pos.	Player	Date of birth (age)	Caps	Club
	GK	Fiorella Pacheco	8 August 1985 (aged 25)		
	GK	Fiorella Valverde	22 January 1989 (aged 21)		
	DF	Milagros Arruela	11 October 1992 (aged 18)		
	DF	Kira Bilecky	12 April 1986 (aged 24)		
	DF	María Elena Gutiérrez	3 June 1977 (aged 33)		
	DF	Fabiola Herrera	18 June 1987 (aged 23)		
	DF	Marisella Joya			
	MF	Brianna Bellido	17 January 1993 (aged 17)		
	MF	Lyana Chirinos	21 June 1992 (aged 18)		
	MF	Adriana Dávila	20 January 1979 (aged 31)		
	MF	Emily Flores	10 September 1990 (aged 20)		
	MF	Tomasa Peña			
	MF	Chiara Rubini			
	FW	Bany Almestar			
	FW	Arantza Colmenares			
	FW	Mariana Herrera			
	FW	Miryam Tristán	19 April 1985 (aged 25)		
		Becky Alfaro			
		Mirella Fabián			
		Carmen Moza			

== Group B ==
=== Brazil ===
Head coach: Kleiton Lima.

No.	Pos.	Player	Date of birth (age)	Caps	Club
1	GK	Andréia Suntaque	14 September 1977 (aged 33)		(Brazil) Santos
2	DF	Marina	17 December 1981 (aged 28)		(Brazil) Novo Mundo
3	DF	Aline (captain)	7 June 1982 (aged 28)		(Brazil) Santos
4	DF	Renata Costa	8 July 1986 (aged 24)		(Brazil) Santos
5	MF	Ester	9 December 1982 (aged 27)		(Brazil) Santos
6	DF	Rosana	7 July 1982 (aged 28)		(United States) Sky Blue
7	MF	Maurine	9 June 1985 (aged 25)		(Brazil) Santos
8	MF	Formiga	3 March 1978 (aged 32)		(United States) Chicago Red Stars
9	FW	Grazielle	28 April 1981 (aged 29)		(Brazil) Santos
10	FW	Marta	19 February 1986 (aged 24)		(Brazil) Santos
11	FW	Cristiane	15 May 1985 (aged 25)		(Brazil) Santos
12	GK	Thaís Picarte	22 July 1982 (aged 28)		Unattached
13	DF	Andréia Rosa	8 July 1984 (aged 26)		(Brazil) Ferroviária
14	DF	Leah	13 December 1990 (aged 19)		(United States) Texas Longhorns
15	FW	Stephane	4 April 1988 (aged 22)		Unattached
16	MF	Gabi Zanotti	28 February 1985 (aged 25)		(United States) Hudson Valley Quickstrike Lady Blues
17	DF	Fabiana	4 August 1989 (aged 21)		(United States) Boston Breakers
18	FW	Daiane Moretti	13 March 1988 (aged 22)		(Brazil) Foz do Iguaçu
19	FW	Daniele	2 April 1983 (aged 27)		(Brazil) Volta Redonda
20	DF	Érika	4 February 1988 (aged 22)		(Brazil) Foz do Iguaçu

=== Colombia ===
Head coach: Ricardo Rozo

No.	Pos.	Player	Date of birth (age)	Caps	Club
	GK	Paula Forero	25 January 1992 (aged 18)		(Colombia) Liga de Bogotá
	GK	Sandra Sepúlveda	3 March 1988 (aged 22)		(Colombia) Liga Antioqueña
	DF	Carolina Arias	2 September 1990 (aged 20)		(Colombia) Liga Vallecaucana
	DF	Nataly Arias	2 April 1986 (aged 24)		Unattached
	DF	Melissa Cepeda	4 January 1993 (aged 17)		(Colombia) Liga Vallecaucana
	DF	Yulieth Domínguez	6 September 1993 (aged 17)		(Colombia) Liga del Tolima
	DF	Fátima Montaño	2 October 1984 (aged 26)		(Colombia) Liga Vallecaucana
	DF	Yuli Muñoz	18 March 1989 (aged 22)		(Colombia) Liga del Tolima
	DF	Kelis Peduzine	21 April 1983 (aged 28)		(Colombia) Liga del Atlántico
	DF	Carmen Rodallega	15 July 1983 (aged 27)		(Colombia) Liga Vallecaucana
	DF	Oriánica Velásquez	1 August 1989 (aged 21)		(United States) Indiana Hoosiers
	MF	Daniela Montoya	22 August 1990 (aged 20)		(Colombia) Liga Antioqueña
	MF	Andrea Peralta	9 May 1988 (aged 23)		(Colombia) Liga del Tolima
	MF	Mildrey Pineda	1 October 1989 (aged 21)		(Colombia) Liga Vallecaucana
	MF	Darnelly Quintero	28 April 1987 (aged 23)		(Colombia) Liga Vallecaucana
	MF	Yoreli Rincón	27 July 1993 (aged 17)		(Colombia) Liga de Bogotá
	FW	Gisela Arrieta	16 April 1987 (aged 23)		(United States) Graceland Yellowjackets
	FW	Katerin Castro	21 November 1991 (aged 19)		(Colombia) Liga del Tolima
	FW	Catalina Usme	25 December 1989 (aged 20)		(Colombia) Liga Antioqueña
	FW	Ingrid Vidal	27 March 1986 (aged 24)		(Colombia) Liga Vallecaucana

=== Paraguay ===
Head coach: Nelson Basualdo.

No.	Pos.	Player	Date of birth (age)	Caps	Club
	GK	Gloria Rodríguez			
	GK	Gloria Saleb	12 June 1991 (aged 19)		
	DF	Carmen Benítez	5 April 1986 (aged 24)		
	DF	Mabel Flores			
	DF	Paola Genes	14 June 1991 (aged 19)		
	DF	Edith González	4 January 1988 (aged 22)		
	DF	Jessica Santacruz	22 January 1990 (aged 20)		
	DF	Angélica Vázquez	14 December 1990 (aged 19)		
	MF	Marta Agüero	9 November 1991 (aged 19)		
	MF	Rosa Aquino	15 September 1990 (aged 20)		
	MF	Ana Fleitas	8 August 1992 (aged 18)		
	MF	Johana Galeano	9 August 1988 (aged 22)		
	MF	Lourdes Ortiz	1 July 1987 (aged 23)		
	MF	Verónica Riveros	23 April 1987 (aged 23)		
	MF	Rebeca Romero	11 May 1989 (aged 21)		
	MF	Mara Talavera			
	MF	Lucero Viveros			
	FW	Rebeca Fernández	1 December 1991 (aged 18)		(Paraguay) Cerro Porteño
	FW	Dulce Quintana	6 February 1989 (aged 21)		(Chile) Everton
	FW	Gloria Villamayor	10 April 1992 (aged 18)		(Chile) Everton

=== Uruguay ===
Head coach: Jorge Burgell.

No.	Pos.	Player	Date of birth (age)	Caps	Club
1	GK	Lorena López	16 September 1987 (aged 23)		(Uruguay) Bella Vista
2	DF	Yenny Martirena	8 June 1988 (aged 22)		(Uruguay) River Plate
3	DF	Paula Viera	25 March 1990 (aged 20)		(Uruguay) River Plate
4	MF	Valeria Chury	19 November 1990 (aged 20)		(Uruguay) River Plate
5	MF	Cindy Gares	23 June 1988 (aged 22)		(Uruguay) River Plate
6	DF	María Noel Lima	25 May 1985 (aged 25)		(Uruguay) River Plate
7	FW	Lourdes Fleitas	28 January 1990 (aged 20)		(Uruguay) Montevideo Wanderers
8	MF	Stefanía Maggiolini	15 October 1986 (aged 24)		(Spain) L'Estartit
9	FW	Giovanna Turturiello	7 March 1986 (aged 24)		(Uruguay) Juventud
10	MF	Mariana González	13 May 1987 (aged 23)		(Uruguay) Colón
11	MF	Mariana Pion	19 December 1992 (aged 17)		(Uruguay) Nacional
12	GK	Lorena Acevedo	30 November 1981 (aged 28)		(Uruguay) Montevideo Wanderers
13	FW	Adriana Castillo	5 May 1990 (aged 20)		(Chile) Colo-Colo
14	DF	Fernanda Grazioli	17 February 1986 (aged 24)		(Uruguay) Juventud
15	DF	Yessica Moreno	8 September 1981 (aged 29)		(Uruguay) Nacional
16	MF	Claudia Pintos	1 July 1981 (aged 29)		(Uruguay) River Plate
17	DF	Virginia Camaño	21 October 1983 (aged 27)		(Uruguay) Juventud
18	FW	Juliana Castro	28 June 1991 (aged 19)		(United States) Missouri Valley Vikings
19	MF	Eliana Arechichu	27 January 1994 (aged 16)		(Uruguay) Huracán FC
20	FW	Carolina Birizamberri	9 July 1995 (aged 15)		(Uruguay) Bella Vista

=== Venezuela ===
Head coach: ?

No.	Pos.	Player	Date of birth (age)	Caps	Club
	GK	Lisbeth Castro	28 April 1988 (aged 22)		(Venezuela) Caracas
	GK	Andrea Tovar	22 August 1990 (aged 20)		(Venezuela) Caracas
	DF	Anabel Guzmán	8 September 1991 (aged 19)		(Venezuela) Caracas
	DF	Oriana Martínez	2 December 1989 (aged 20)		(Venezuela) Universidad Bello
	DF	Idanis Mendoza	17 August 1988 (aged 22)		(Venezuela) Danz
	DF	Andrea Pérez			
	DF	Naylé Quintero			
	DF	Soleidys Rengel	3 December 1993 (aged 16)		(Venezuela) Deportivo Anzoátegui
	DF	María Eugenia Rodríguez	26 November 1994 (aged 15)		
	MF	Yusmery Ascanio	20 December 1990 (aged 19)		(Venezuela) Caracas
	MF	Lisbeth Bandrés	24 March 1988 (aged 22)		(Venezuela) Caracas
	MF	Karla Torres	4 June 1992 (aged 18)		(Venezuela) UCV
	FW	Oriana Altuve	3 October 1992 (aged 18)		(Venezuela) Caracas
	FW	Andreína Bastidas			
	FW	Ysaura Viso	17 June 1993 (aged 17)		(Venezuela) Estudiantes de Guárico
