= Bellido =

Bellido is a Spanish surname. It was originally a nickname for someone handsome, from the Spanish bellido. It has also been used as a given name in the past. Notable people with surname include:

- Brianna Bellido (born 1993), Peruvian-American footballer
- Gerónimo Giménez; full name Gerónimo Giménez y Bellido (1854–1923), Spanish conductor and composer
- Guido Bellido (born 1979), Prime minister of Peru for a short period in 2021
- Javier Bellido (born 1966), Spanish footballer
- José Antonio Dammert Bellido (1917–2008), Peruvian bishop
- José María Bellido (born 1977), Spanish politician
- María Bellido (1755–1809), Spanish heroine
- María Parado de Bellido (1777–1822), indigenous Peruvian revolutionary
- Pablo Bellido (born 1976), Spanish politician
- Rubén Blades; full name Rubén Blades Bellido de Luna (born 1948), Panamanian singer
- Ximena Bellido (born 1966), Peruvian badminton player
