= Luciana Gómez =

Luciana Gómez may refer to:

- Luciana Gómez (footballer, born 2000), Uruguayan footballer
- Luciana Gómez (footballer, born 1984), Uruguayan footballer
