= List of presidents of the Cortes of Castilla–La Mancha =

President of the Cortes of Castilla–La Mancha
- Presidente de las Cortes de Castilla–La Mancha
- Flag of Castilla–La Mancha

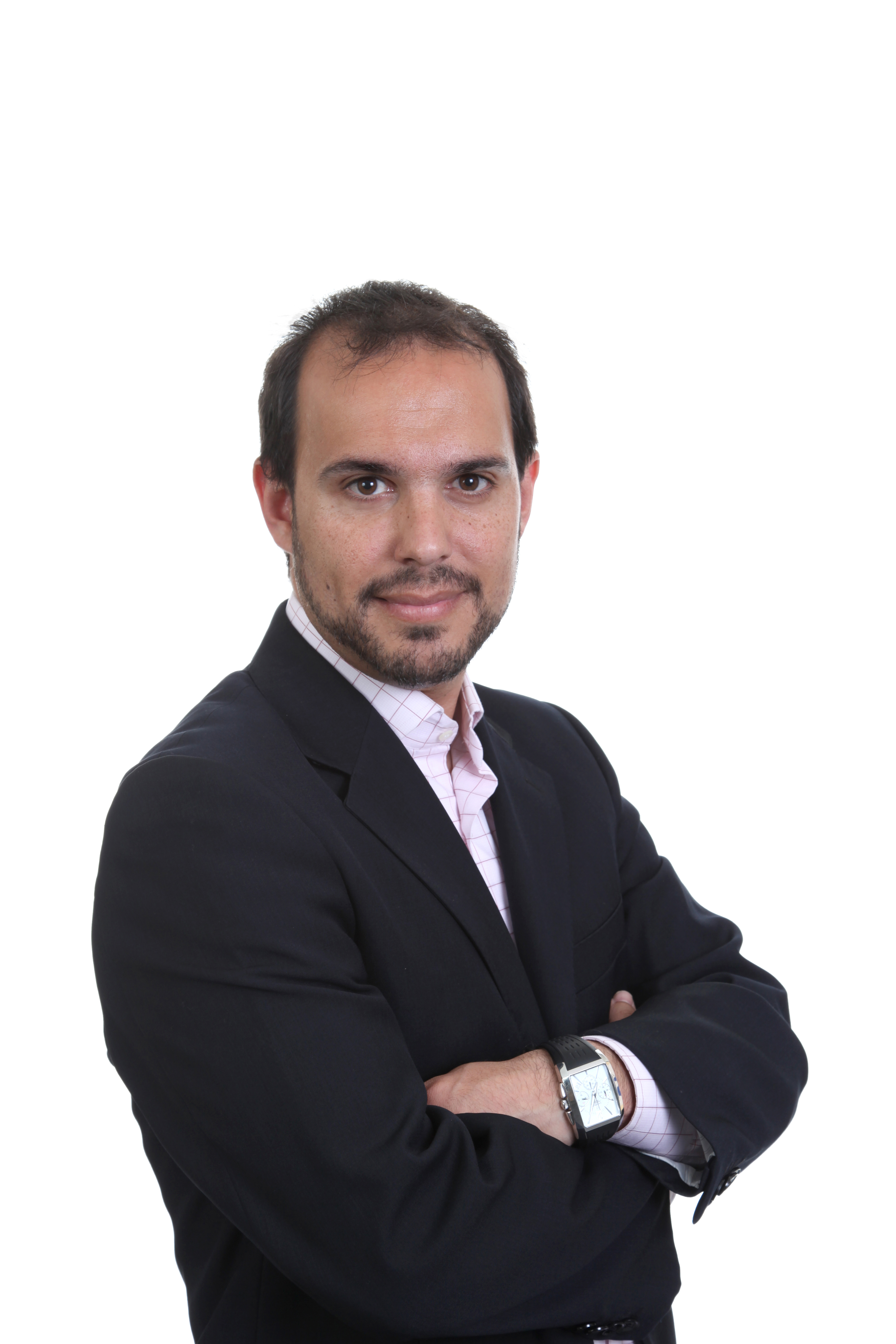
- Incumbent; Pablo Bellido since 19 June 2019
- Member of: Cortes of Castilla–La Mancha
- Formation: 31 May 1983
- First holder: Javier de Irízar

This article lists the presidents of the Cortes of Castilla–La Mancha, the regional legislature of Castilla–La Mancha.

== Presidents ==
^{No.}	Name	Portrait	Party	Took office	Left office	^{Legs.}	^{Refs.}
1	Javier de Irízar		Socialist Party of Castilla–La Mancha	31 May 1983	1 July 1987	1st	
2	José Manuel Martínez		Socialist Party of Castilla–La Mancha	2 July 1987	16 June 1991	2nd	
3	José María Barreda		Socialist Party of Castilla–La Mancha	18 June 1991	20 June 1995	3rd	
3	José María Barreda		Socialist Party of Castilla–La Mancha	21 June 1995	8 July 1997	4th	
4	María del Carmen Blázquez		Socialist Party of Castilla–La Mancha	8 July 1997	6 July 1999	4th	
5	Antonio Marco		Socialist Party of Castilla–La Mancha	7 July 1999	16 June 2003	5th	
6	Fernando López		Socialist Party of Castilla–La Mancha	17 June 2003	18 June 2007	6th	
7	Francisco Pardo		Socialist Party of Castilla–La Mancha	19 June 2007	16 June 2011	7th	
8	Vicente Tirado		People's Party of Castilla–La Mancha	16 June 2011	June 2015	8th	
9	Jesús Fernández		Socialist Party of Castilla–La Mancha	18 June 2015	19 June 2019	9th	
10	Pablo Bellido		Socialist Party of Castilla–La Mancha	19 June 2019		10th	
