= Pablo Bellido =

Spanish politician (born 1976)

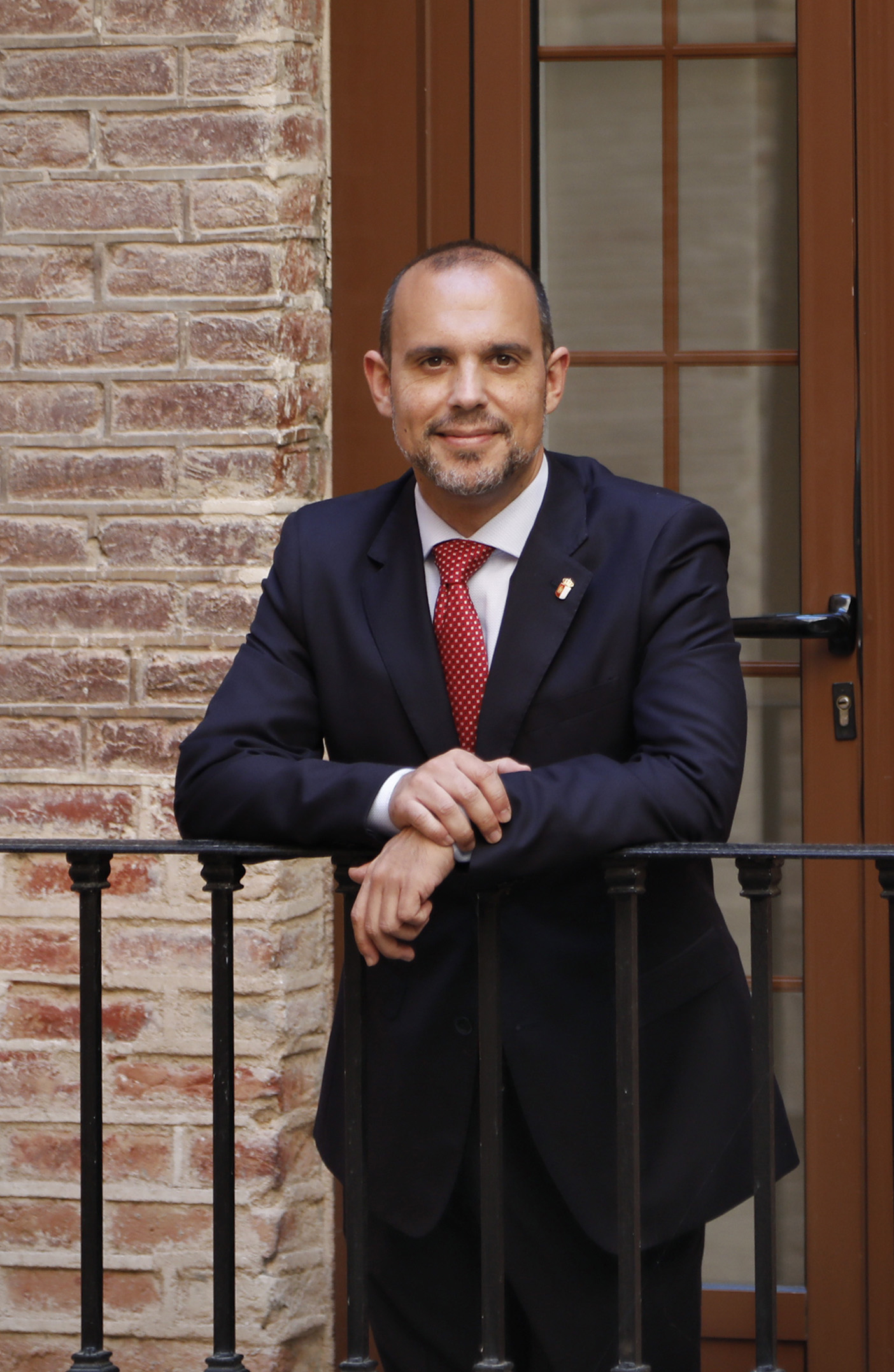
- Bellido in 2021

President of the Cortes of Castilla–La Mancha
- Incumbent
- Assumed office 19 June 2019
- Preceded by: Jesús Fernández Vaquero

Personal details
- Born: 23 April 1976 (age 50)
- Party: Spanish Socialist Workers' Party

Pablo Bellido Acevedo (born 23 April 1976) is a Spanish politician serving as president of the Cortes of Castilla–La Mancha since 2019. From 2016 to 2019, he was a member of the Congress of Deputies. From 2007 to 2015, he served as mayor of Azuqueca de Henares.
