= Melissa Ortiz =

Colombian footballer (born 1990)

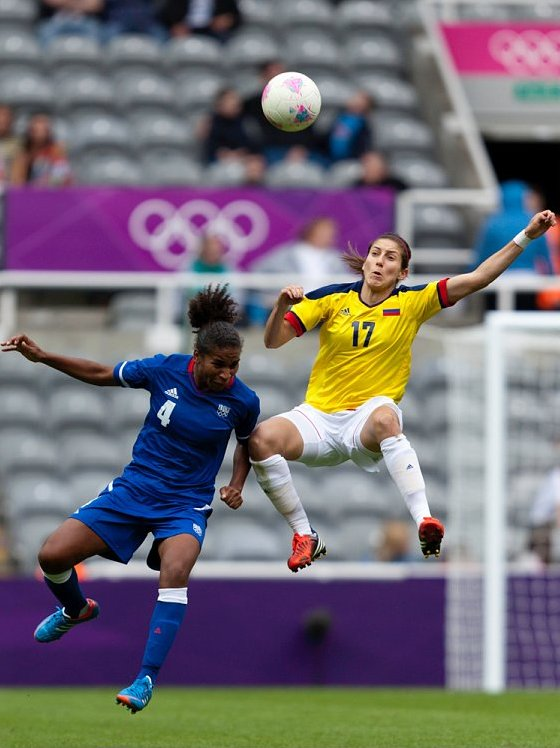
- Ortiz with Colombia in 2012

Personal information
- Full name: Melissa Marie Ortiz Matallana
- Date of birth: 24 January 1990 (age 36)
- Place of birth: West Palm Beach, Florida, U.S.
- Height: 1.74 m (5 ft 9 in)
- Positions: Forward; attacking midfielder

College career
Years	Team	Apps	(Gls)
2008–2011	Lynn University	69	(44)

Senior career*
Years	Team	Apps	(Gls)
2013	KR Reykjavik	11	(4)
2013	Boston Breakers		
2017	Cúcuta Deportivo		

International career
2010	Colombia U-20	5	(1)
2009–2017	Colombia	28	(3)
Medal record
Copa América
Silver medal – second place	2014 Ecuador	Team
- * Club domestic league appearances and goals

Melissa Marie Ortiz Matallana OLY (born 24 January 1990) is a former professional footballer who played as a striker or attacking midfielder. Born and raised in the United States to Colombian parents, she capped for the Colombia women's national team. She participated at the FIFA U-20 FIFA Women's World Cup Germany, the 2012 Summer Olympics, 2014 Copa America, and 2014 Juegos Centroamericanos during her seven years with the Colombian National Team.

== Early life ==
Ortiz was born in West Palm Beach, Florida. She graduated from Cardinal Newman High School in 2008.

== College career ==
Ortiz played for Division II Lynn University for four years where she was nominated for the 2011 Sunshine State Conference Co-Player and Offensive Player of the Year. She became the first player in the program's history to receive both awards in the same season. Additionally, she was the very first Offensive Player of the Year and second Player of the Year. At Lynn, Ortiz accumulated over 100 points, becoming the 10th player in school history to accomplish this feat. Her SSC Player and Offensive Player of the Year recognition gave her the perfect trifecta award, as in 2008 she was the SSC Freshman of the Year. Ortiz was also the second player at Lynn to be a four-time All-SSC selection. She was later named to the SSC All-Decade second team for the 2010s.

== Club career ==
=== KR Reykjavik ===
She played the 2013 season in group A of Iceland's second division 1. delid kvenna with KR Reykjavik in their first season out of the first division Úrvalsdeild kvenna since 1984. Oritz's four goals in eleven appearances helped the team to with the second division regular season, but KR lost the promotion play-off.

=== Boston Breakers ===
On 5 December 2013 Ortiz signed for the Boston Breakers of the National Women's Soccer League, but on 3 April 2014, the Breakers waived Ortiz.

=== Cúcuta Deportivo ===
In 2017, Ortiz played for Cúcuta Deportivo in the first women's Colombian Professional League DIMAYOR. Cúcuta made it to the quarterfinals of the league playoffs.

== International career ==
Ortiz made 5 appearances for the Colombia U-20 team, representing the country in the 2010 FIFA U-20 Women's World Cup where she scored the team's best goal in a 3–1 loss to Germany.

In 2009, Ortiz made her debut for the Colombia senior team. She was named alternate in the 2011 FIFA Women's World Cup in Germany, then to the full team in the 2012 London Olympics. On 28 July 2012 at Hampden Park, Ortiz came on as a substitute in the 3–0 loss to the United States team that included Alex Morgan, Abby Wambach and future teammate Heather O'Reilly of the Boston Breakers. On 31 July 2012 she played in front of a crowd of 13,184 at St James' Park which is home to Newcastle United against France where they lost 1–0 in the final Group G game.

After the Colombian Federation's several year pause from competition, Ortiz returned to represent the country in the 2014 CONMEBOL Copa America where she scored 1 goal against Venezuela and helped qualify Colombia to the 2015 FIFA Women's World Cup, 2015 Pan-American Games, and 2016 Rio Olympics. She also competed and was named with her teammates silver medalists of the Central American Games Veracruz in the 2014. Colombia lost in the final to Mexico 2–0.

Ortiz was active with the national team all through 2015 in preparation for the FIFA Women's World Cup. Just a week before the tournament, she tore her right Achilles tendon during a scrimmage in Colorado. This left her out of competition from the World Cup and Pan-American Games.

In 2016, Ortiz returned to action from injury and was named to the Olympic roster as an alternate. Ortiz had 28 international team appearances and 3 goals.

== Media career ==
=== Broadcasting and Social Media ===
After retiring from international soccer, Ortiz launched a media career that has made her a prominent voice in American soccer broadcasting. Frustrated by inequality in Colombian women's soccer, Ortiz began producing her own content, building a brand on social media before landing roles with Fox, ESPN, and MLS. She is now a sideline reporter for Warner Bros. Discovery Sports and a studio analyst for Apple TV+'s MLS coverage, drawing on her on-field experience and advocacy for women's equality in sport.

=== Entrepreneurship ===
In 2021, Ortiz co-founded Kickoff Coffee Co., a specialty coffee company launched with her brother and a business partner. The venture reflects her interest in entrepreneurship and combines elements of her Colombian heritage and soccer background.
