= Mayta Vásconez =

Ecuadorian footballer (born 1990)

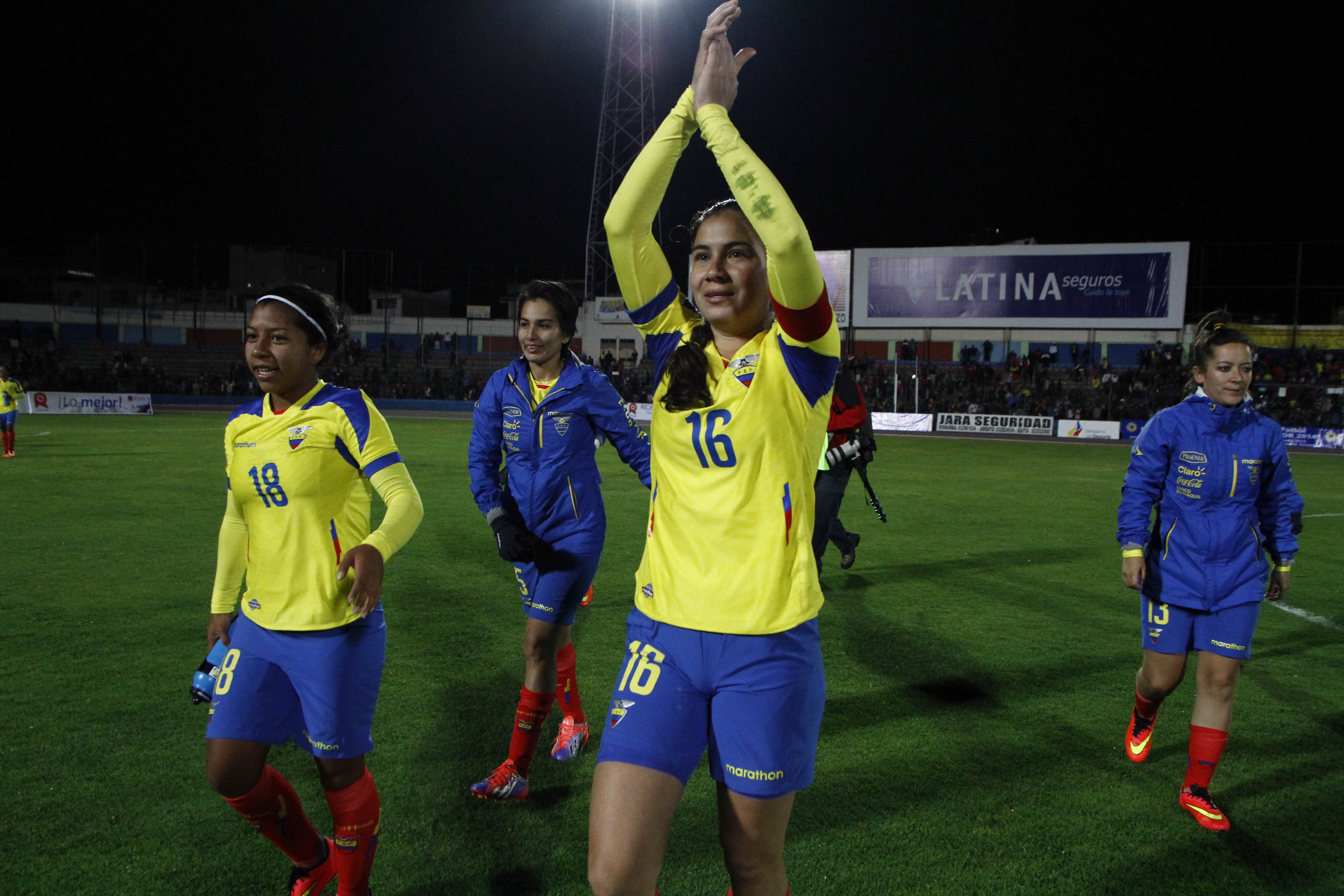
- Vásconez representing Ecuador at the 2014 Copa América Femenina

Personal information
- Full name: María Isabel Vásconez Gomezcoello
- Date of birth: 4 June 1990 (age 36)
- Place of birth: Cuenca, Ecuador
- Height: 1.60 m (5 ft 3 in)
- Position: Midfielder

Team information
- Current team: Carneras UPS

Senior career*
Years	Team	Apps	(Gls)
2006–2013	Azuay selection		
2013–2014	Espuce		
2014–2015	Carneras UPS		
2015	UE Sant Andreu		
2015–2017	Espuce		
2017–2018	Deportivo Cuenca		
2020–	Carneras UPS		

International career^{‡}
2014	Ecuador	2	(0)
- * Club domestic league appearances and goals ‡ National team caps and goals as of 28 September 2014

María Isabel Vásconez Gomezcoello (born 4 June 1990), known as Mayta Vásconez, is an Ecuadorian footballer who plays as a midfielder for Carneras UPS. She has been a member of the Ecuador women's national team.

== Club career ==
Vásconez played for Spanish Segunda División club UE Sant Andreu from early to mid 2015.

== International career ==
Vásconez played two matches for Ecuador at senior level during the 2014 Copa América Femenina. She retired from international football the next year by not being selected for the 2015 FIFA Women's World Cup despite she was at the time the only female footballer formed in Ecuador who was playing in Europe.

== Personal life ==
Vásconez is mother.
