= Sonia Torihuano =

Bolivian footballer (born 1991)

Personal information
- Full name: Sonia Torihuano Flores
- Date of birth: 28 November 1991 (age 34)
- Height: 1.68 m (5 ft 6 in)
- Position: Midfielder

International career^{‡}
Years	Team	Apps	(Gls)
2014	Bolivia	1	(0)
2018	Bolivia (futsal)		
Medal record
Women's futsal
Representing Bolivia
South American Games
Bronze medal – third place	2018 Cochabamba	Team
- ‡ National team caps and goals as of 18 September 2014

Sonia Torihuano Flores (born 28 November 1991) is a Bolivian futsal player and a footballer who plays as a midfielder. She has been a member of the Bolivia women's national team.

== Early life ==
Torihuano hails from the Chuquisaca Department.

== International career ==
Torihuano played for Bolivia at senior level in the 2014 Copa América Femenina.
