= Idanis Mendoza =

Venezuelan footballer (born 1988)

Personal information
- Full name: Idanis Del Valle Mendoza Conde
- Date of birth: 17 August 1988 (age 38)
- Place of birth: El Tigre, Venezuela
- Position: Centre-back

Team information
- Current team: UAI Urquiza

Senior career*
Years	Team	Apps	(Gls)
- Danz
2017	Colón	12	(2)
2018	Alianza Petrolera		
2018–2019	Colón	19	(1)
2019	Peñarol	8	(0)
2020–	UAI Urquiza		

International career^{‡}
2010	Venezuela	7+	(0+)
- * Club domestic league appearances and goals ‡ National team caps and goals as of 7 November 2010

Idanis Del Valle Mendoza Conde (born 17 August 1988) is a Venezuelan footballer who plays as a centre-back for Argentine club UAI Urquiza. She has been a member of the Venezuela women's national team.

== Early life ==
Mendoza was born in El Tigre.

== Club career ==
Mendoza has played for Danz in Venezuela, for Colón FC (two stints) and Peñarol in Uruguay, for Alianza Petrolera FC in Colombia and for UAI Urquiza in Argentina.

== International career ==
Mendoza capped for Venezuela at senior level during the 2010 Central American and Caribbean Games and the 2010 South American Women's Football Championship.
