= Merly Zambrano =

Ecuadorian footballer (born 1981)

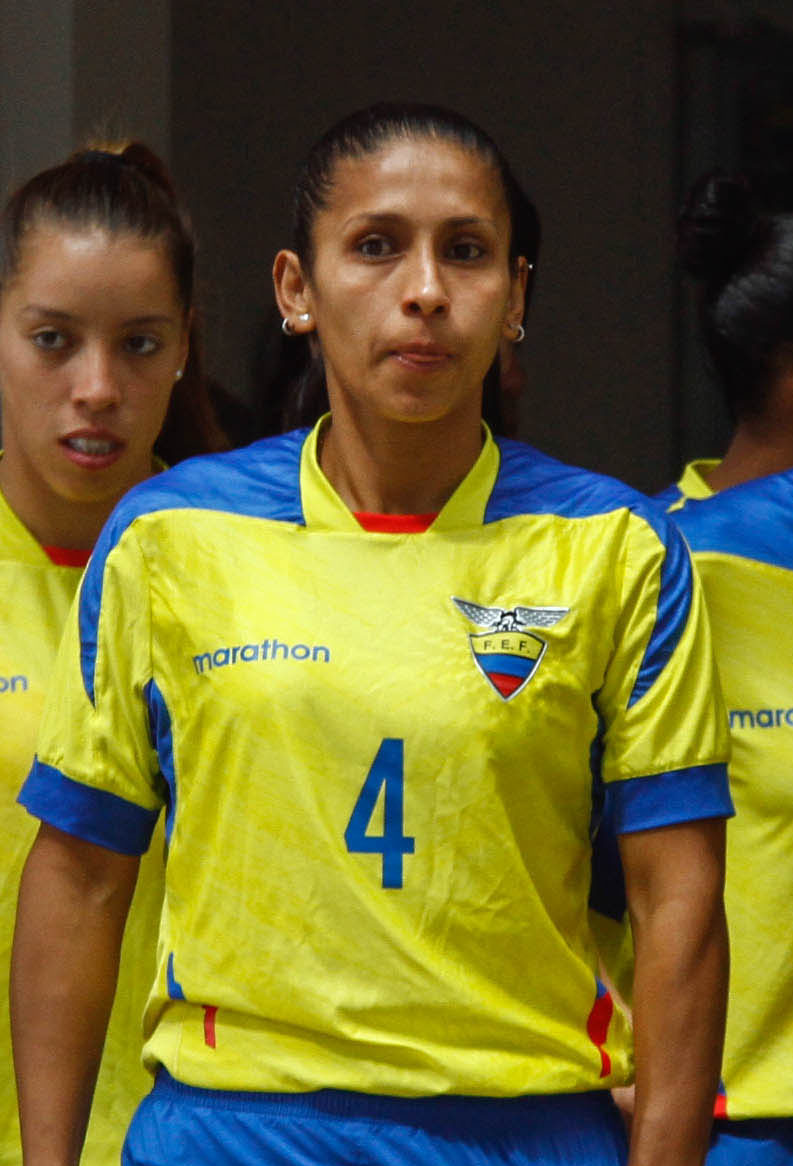

Personal information
- Full name: Merly Cristina Zambrano Mendoza
- Date of birth: December 7, 1981 (age 44)
- Place of birth: El Carmen, Ecuador
- Height: 1.64 m (5 ft 4 1/2 in)
- Position: Defender

Team information
- Current team: Club Ñañas
- Number: 4

Senior career*
Years	Team	Apps	(Gls)
2006–2010	Pichincha selection	5	(2)
2010–2013	Loja selection	6	(2)
2011	→ LDU Quito (loan)		
2013	Pichincha selection		
2013–2019	Espuce		
2020–	Club Ñañas		

International career^{‡}
2014–2015	Ecuador	11	(0)
- * Club domestic league appearances and goals as of 18:55, 22 June 2015 (UTC) ‡ National team caps and goals as of 15:30, 17 June 2015 (UTC)

Merly Cristina Zambrano Mendoza (born December 7, 1981) is an Ecuadorian international footballer who plays as a defender for Club Ñañas. She played for Ecuador at the 2015 FIFA Women's World Cup.
