= Nataly Méndez =

Bolivian footballer (born 1987)

Personal information
- Full name: Nataly Méndez Ramírez
- Date of birth: 13 October 1987 (age 39)
- Height: 1.72 m (5 ft 8 in)
- Position: Goalkeeper

International career^{‡}
Years	Team	Apps	(Gls)
2014	Bolivia	1	(0)
- ‡ National team caps and goals as of 14 September 2014

Nataly Méndez Ramírez (born 13 October 1987) is a Bolivian footballer who plays as a goalkeeper. She has been a member of the Bolivia women's national team.

== International career ==
Méndez played for Bolivia at senior level in the 2014 Copa América Femenina.
