= Fiorella Pacheco =

Peruvian footballer (born 1985)

Personal information
- Full name: Fiorella Alcira Pacheco Cabrera
- Date of birth: 8 August 1985 (age 41)
- Position: Goalkeeper

International career^{‡}
Years	Team	Apps	(Gls)
2003–2006	Peru	8	(0)
- ‡ National team caps and goals as of 19 November 2006

Fiorella Alcira Pacheco Cabrera (born 8 August 1985) is a Peruvian former footballer who played as a goalkeeper. She has been a member of the Peru women's national team.

== International career ==
Pacheco capped for Peru at senior level during two Copa América Femenina editions (2003 and 2006).
