= Paola Álvarez =

Bolivian footballer (born 1990)

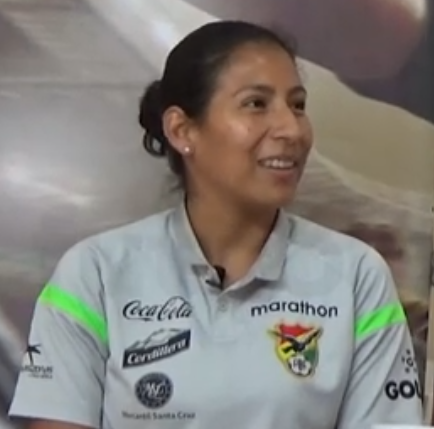
- In a 2019 interview

Personal information
- Full name: Paola Andrea Álvarez Aguilar
- Date of birth: 10 September 1990 (age 36)
- Position: Goalkeeper

Team information
- Current team: Racing Santander
- Number: 1

Senior career*
Years	Team	Apps	(Gls)
- Universidad Santa Cruz
- San Martín de Porres
- FC Leonas
- San Martín de Porres
2018	Deportivo ITA		
2019	Taubaté	0	(0)
2019–	Racing Santander	3	(0)

International career^{‡}
2010–2018	Bolivia	5	(0)
- * Club domestic league appearances and goals as of 10 November 2019 ‡ National team caps and goals as of 13 April 2018

Paola Andrea Álvarez Aguilar (born 10 September 1990) is a Bolivian footballer who plays as a goalkeeper for Spanish Segunda División Pro club Racing de Santander and the Bolivia women's national team.

== Early life ==
Álvarez hails from the Santa Cruz Department.

== Club career ==
Álvarez played for Brazilian club EC Taubaté.

== International career ==
Álvarez played for Bolivia at senior level in two Copa América Femenina editions (2010 and 2018).
