= Mercedes Núñez =

Paraguayan footballer (born 1986)

Personal information
- Full name: Mercedes Núñez Monzón
- Date of birth: 29 July 1986 (age 40)
- Height: 1.58 m (5 ft 2 in)
- Position: Midfielder

Senior career*
Years	Team	Apps	(Gls)
- Cerro Porteño

International career^{‡}
2014	Paraguay	2	(0)
- * Club domestic league appearances and goals ‡ National team caps and goals as of 16 September 2014

Mercedes Núñez Monzón (born 29 July 1986) is a Paraguayan footballer who plays as a midfielder. She has been a member of the Paraguay women's national team.

== International career ==
Núñez represented her nation at the 2014 Copa América Femenina.
