= Cecilia Domeniguini =

Uruguayan footballer (born 1991)

Personal information
- Full name: Cecilia Domeniguini Coccolo
- Date of birth: 22 September 1991 (age 35)
- Height: 1.66 m (5 ft 5 1/2 in)
- Position: Midfielder

Team information
- Current team: Peñarol Colonia

Senior career*
Years	Team	Apps	(Gls)
–2013	Nacional San José		
2014–2018	Colón	73	(39)
2019–	Peñarol Colonia		

International career^{‡}
2014	Uruguay	4	(0)
- * Club domestic league appearances and goals ‡ National team caps and goals as of 19 September 2014

Cecilia Domeniguini Coccolo (born 22 September 1991) is a Uruguayan footballer who plays as a midfielder for Peñarol Colonia. She has been a member of the Uruguay women's national team.

== Club career ==
Domeniguini played in Uruguay for Colón.

== International career ==
Domeniguini played for Uruguay at senior level in the 2014 Copa América Femenina.

== Personal life ==
Domeniguini lives in Colonia del Sacramento.
