= Mariana Espinosa =

Ecuadorian footballer (born 1984)

Personal information
- Full name: Mariana Alexandra Espinosa Chicaiza
- Date of birth: 13 November 1984 (age 41)
- Place of birth: Quito, Ecuador
- Positions: Midfielder; left back

International career^{‡}
Years	Team	Apps	(Gls)
2003–2010	Ecuador	7+	(0)
- ‡ National team caps and goals as of 10 November 2010

Mariana Alexandra Espinosa Chicaiza (born 13 November 1984) is an Ecuadorian former footballer who played as a midfielder and a left back. She has been a member of the Ecuador women's national team.

== International career ==
Espinosa capped for Ecuador at senior level during three Copa América Femenina editions (2003, 2006 and 2010).
