= Valeria Chury =

Uruguayan footballer (born 1990)

Personal information
- Date of birth: 19 November 1990 (age 35)
- Position: Midfielder

Team information
- Current team: Banco República (futsal)

Senior career*
Years	Team	Apps	(Gls)
- Rampla Juniors
2020–	Banco República (futsal)	0	(0)

International career^{‡}
2010	Uruguay	1+	(0+)
- * Club domestic league appearances and goals ‡ National team caps and goals as of 7 November 2010.

Valeria Chury (born 19 November 1990) is a Uruguayan footballer, who plays as a midfielder, and a futsal player, who plays for Club Banco República. She has been a member of the Uruguay women's national football team.

== Club career ==
Chury has played football for Rampla Juniors in Uruguay.

== International career ==
Chury capped for Uruguay at senior level during the 2010 South American Women's Football Championship.
