= Kira Bilecky =

Peruvian footballer (born 1986)

Personal information
- Full name: Kira Marie Bilecky Drago
- Date of birth: 12 April 1986 (age 40)
- Place of birth: United States
- Height: 1.70 m (5 ft 7 in)
- Position: Defender

Youth career
- Woodrow Wilson Tigers

College career
Years	Team	Apps	(Gls)
2004–2007	Purdue Boilermakers		

Senior career*
Years	Team	Apps	(Gls)
2008	Åland United	2+	(1)

International career^{‡}
2006	Peru	2	(0)
- * Club domestic league appearances and goals as of 24 May 2008. ‡ National team caps and goals as of 19 November 2006.

Kira Marie Bilecky Drago (born 12 April 1986) is a former footballer who played as a defender. Born in the United States, she has been a member of the Peru national team.

== Early life ==
Bilecky was raised in Washington, D.C. She was born to an American father and a Peruvian mother.

== High school and college career ==
Bilecky has attended the Woodrow Wilson High School in Washington, D.C., and the Purdue University in West Lafayette, Indiana.

== Club career ==
Bilecky has played for Åland United in Finland.

== International career ==
Bilecky joined Peru at the 2005 Bolivarian Games. She capped at senior level during the 2006 South American Women's Football Championship.

== Personal life ==
Bilecky is married to another woman.
