= Claudia Rodríguez =

Venezuelan footballer (born 1995)

Personal information
- Full name: Claudia Rodríguez Abella
- Date of birth: 2 May 1995 (age 31)
- Place of birth: Los Palos Grandes, Venezuela
- Height: 1.76 m (5 ft 9 in)
- Position: Defender

Team information
- Current team: Parquesol

Senior career*
Years	Team	Apps	(Gls)
–2014	Los Cachimbos		
2016–2017	Deportivo La Guaira		
2017–2018	Logroño		
2018–2020	Lorca Féminas		
2020–	Parquesol	0	(0)

International career^{‡}
2014	Venezuela U20		
2014–	Venezuela	1	(0)
- * Club domestic league appearances and goals ‡ National team caps and goals as of 17 September 2014

Claudia Rodríguez Abella (born 2 May 1995) is a Venezuelan footballer who plays as a defender for Spanish Primera Nacional club CD Parquesol and the Venezuela women's national team. She also holds Spanish citizenship.

== International career ==
Rodríguez represented Venezuela at the 2014 South American U-20 Women's Championship. At senior level, she played the 2014 Copa América Femenina.
