= María Elena Gutiérrez =

Peruvian footballer (born 1977)

Personal information
- Full name: María Elena Gutiérrez Castañeda
- Date of birth: 3 June 1977 (age 49)
- Position: Right back

International career^{‡}
Years	Team	Apps	(Gls)
2003–2006	Peru	8	(0)
- ‡ National team caps and goals as of 19 November 2006

María Elena Gutiérrez Castañeda (born 3 June 1977) is a Peruvian former footballer who played as a right back. She has been a member of the Peru women's national team.

== International career ==
Gutiérrez capped for Peru at senior level during two Copa América Femenina editions (2003 and 2006).
