= Yesica Hernández =

Uruguayan footballer (born 1988)

Personal information
- Full name: Yesica Luciana Hernández Ferrando
- Date of birth: 16 September 1988 (age 38)
- Height: 1.69 m (5 ft 6 1/2 in)
- Positions: Midfielder; forward

College career
Years	Team	Apps	(Gls)
2010–2012	Missouri Valley Vikings		

Senior career*
Years	Team	Apps	(Gls)
2014–2015	Colón	12	(1)

International career^{‡}
2014	Uruguay	3	(0)
- * Club domestic league appearances and goals ‡ National team caps and goals as of 19 September 2014

Yesica Luciana Hernández Ferrando (born 16 September 1988) is a Uruguayan football manager and former player, who played as a midfielder. She has been a member of the Uruguay women's national team.

== Early life ==
Hernández hails from Ombúes de Lavalle.

== College career ==
Hernández attended the Missouri Valley College in the United States.

== Club career ==
Hernández played in Uruguay for Colón.

== International career ==
Hernández played for Uruguay at senior level in the 2014 Copa América Femenina.

== Personal life ==
Hernández is vegetarian.
