= Melissa Díaz =

Peruvian footballer (born 1983)

Personal information
- Full name: Melissa Milagros Díaz Caballero
- Date of birth: 26 October 1983 (age 43)
- Place of birth: Lima, Peru
- Height: 1.65 m (5 ft 5 in)
- Position: Midfielder

Senior career*
Years	Team	Apps	(Gls)
- Sport Coopsol
- Universitario
2012–2013	Moratalaz		
2013–2018	Vallecas		
2018–2019	Pozuelo	6+	(0+)

International career^{‡}
2003–2014	Peru	7	(0)
- * Club domestic league appearances and goals as of 20 October 2019 ‡ National team caps and goals as of 20 September 2014

Melissa Milagros “Mel” Díaz Caballero (born 26 October 1983) is a Peruvian footballer who plays as a midfielder. She has been a member of the Peru women's national team.

== International career ==
Díaz played for Peru at senior level in two Copa América Femenina editions (2003 and 2014).
