= Karen Vénica =

Argentine footballer

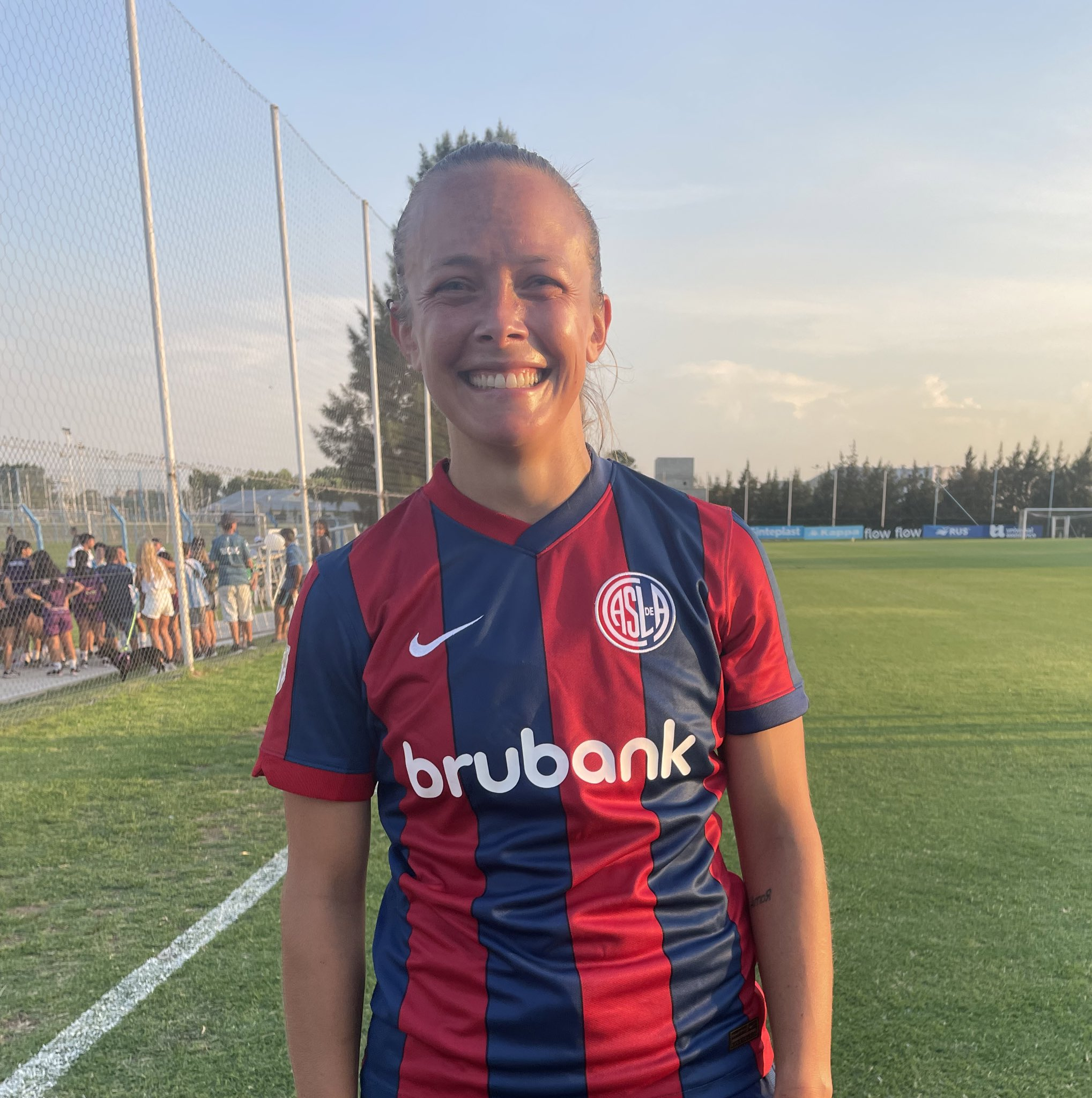
- Karen Venica, after her debut with San Lorenzo, 2023

Personal information
- Full name: Karen Noelia Vénica
- Date of birth: 25 January 1992 (age 34)
- Place of birth: Guadalupe Norte, Santa Fe, Argentina
- Height: 1.61 m (5 ft 3 in)
- Position: Midfielder

Team information
- Current team: Club Atletico River Plate

Senior career*
Years	Team	Apps	(Gls)
2013–2020	UAI Urquiza		

International career
2014–2015	Argentina	1+	(0+)
- * Club domestic league appearances and goals

Karen Noelia Vénica (born 25 January 1992) is an Argentine footballer who plays as a midfielder for Club Atlético River Plate. She was a member of the Argentina women's national team.

She appeared at the 2014 Copa América Femenina and the 2015 Pan American Games.

== Personal life ==
Vénica is a supporter of River Plate.
