= Carla Carvalho =

Venezuelan footballer

Personal information
- Full name: Carla Sofía Carvalho Da Silva
- Height: 1.68 m (5 ft 6 in)
- Positions: Forward; midfielder

College career
Years	Team	Apps	(Gls)
–2012	WVU Tech Golden Bears	17+	(2+)

Senior career*
Years	Team	Apps	(Gls)
- UCAB Spirit
- Atlético Venezuela

International career^{‡}
2014	Venezuela	1	(0)
- * Club domestic league appearances and goals ‡ National team caps and goals as of 18 September 2014

Carla Sofía Carvalho Da Silva is a Venezuelan footballer who plays as a forward. She has been a member of the Venezuela women's national team.

== Early life ==
Carvalho hails from Caracas.

== College career ==
Carvalho attended the West Virginia University Institute of Technology in the United States.

== Club career ==
Carvalho has played for Atlético Venezuela CF.

== International career ==
Carvalho played for Venezuela at senior level in the 2014 Copa América Femenina.

== Personal life ==
Carvalho is of Portuguese descent.
