= Vanessa Herrera =

Ecuadorian footballer (born 1987)

Personal information
- Full name: Paola Vanessa Herrera Núñez
- Date of birth: 10 March 1987 (age 39)
- Place of birth: Quito, Ecuador
- Position: Defender

Senior career*
Years	Team	Apps	(Gls)
- Espe
- Cumanda

International career^{‡}
2003–2010	Ecuador	2+	(0)
- * Club domestic league appearances and goals ‡ National team caps and goals as of 10 November 2010

Paola Vanessa Herrera Núñez (born 10 March 1987), known as Vanessa Herrera, is an Ecuadorian former footballer who played as a defender. She has been a member of the Ecuador women's national team.

== International career ==
Herrera capped for Ecuador at senior level during the 2010 South American Women's Football Championship.
