= Valeria Colmán =

Uruguayan footballer (born 1990)

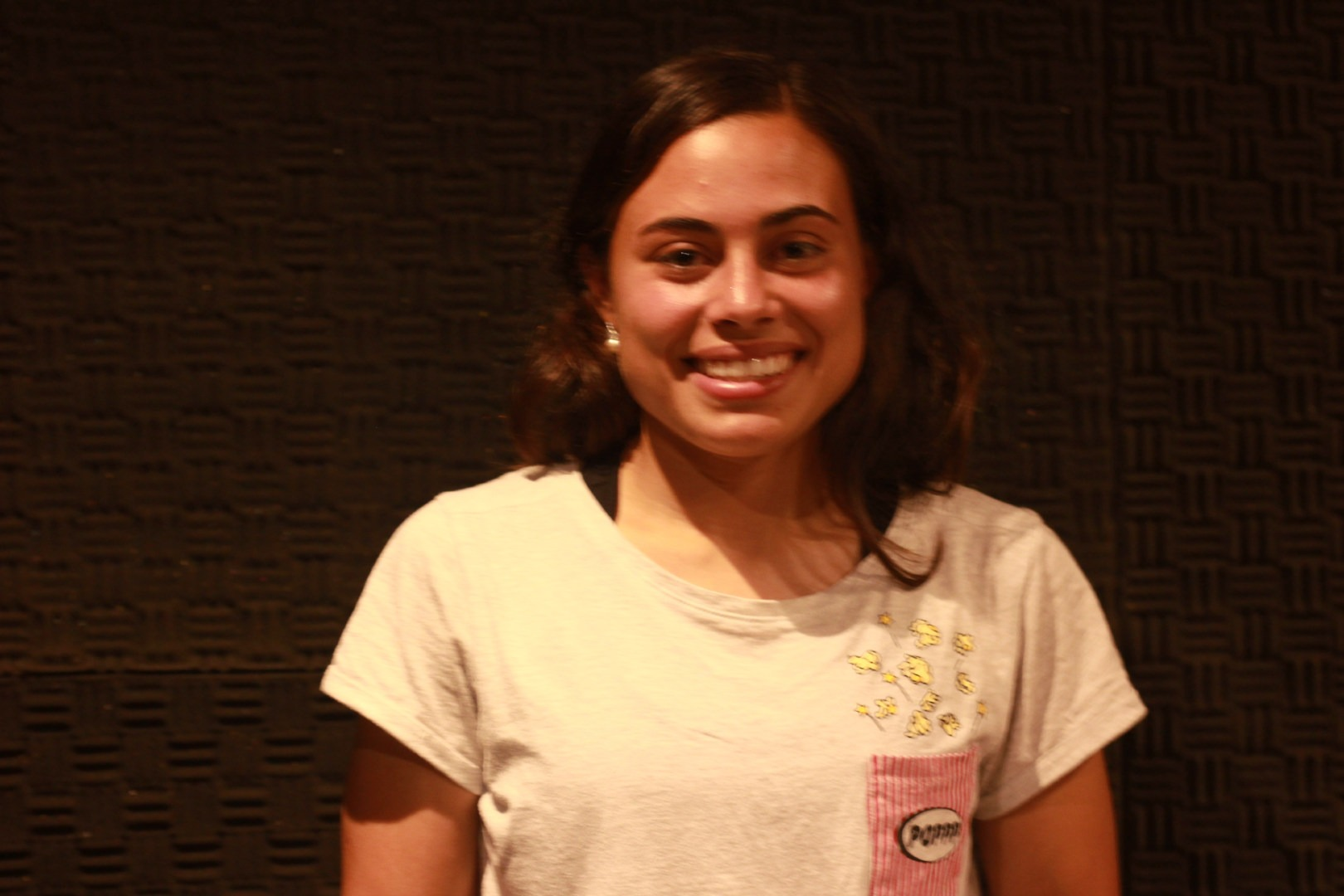

Personal information
- Full name: Valeria Colmán Carrizo
- Date of birth: 25 July 1990 (age 36)
- Height: 1.56 m (5 ft 1 1/2 in)
- Position: Defender

Team information
- Current team: Nacional

Senior career*
Years	Team	Apps	(Gls)
2008	Sportivo Artigas de Sauce		
2009–	Nacional	84	(14)
2014–2015	Nacional (futsal)	1	(0)

International career^{‡}
2014–	Uruguay	5	(0)
- * Club domestic league appearances and goals ‡ National team caps and goals as of 3 March 2019

Valeria Colmán Carrizo (born 25 July 1990) is a Uruguayan footballer who plays as a defender for Club Nacional de Football and the Uruguay women's national team.

== International career ==
Colmán played for Uruguay in two Copa América Femenina editions (2014 and 2018).
