= Mariela Moreira =

Bolivian footballer (born 1983)

Personal information
- Full name: Mariela Moreira Castedo
- Date of birth: 24 March 1983 (age 43)
- Position: Centre back

Team information
- Current team: Mundo Futuro
- Number: 6

Senior career*
Years	Team	Apps	(Gls)
- Mundo Futuro

International career^{‡}
2010	Bolivia	1+	(0)
- * Club domestic league appearances and goals ‡ National team caps and goals as of 10 November 2010

Mariela Moreira Castedo (born 24 March 1983) is a Bolivian footballer who plays as a centre back for Mundo Futuro. She has been a member of the Bolivia women's national team.

== Early life ==
Moreira hails from Santa Cruz Department.

== International career ==
Moreira capped for Bolivia at senior level during the 2010 South American Women's Football Championship.
