= Lorena López =

Nicaraguan-American journalist

- Born: 1963 (age 62–63); Estelí, Nicaragua
- Occupation: Journalist

Lorena López (born 1963) is a Nicaraguan-American journalist and the founder of La Prensa de Iowa, a Spanish-language newspaper serving western Iowa.

López was born and raised in Estelí, Nicaragua, before moving to Managua in 1982 to attend the Universidad de Centroamerica and study journalism, having been inspired by Pedro Joaquín Chamorro Cardenal. She became an interviewer for Canal 6, getting to interview Pope John Paul II and Fidel Castro. However, she had to flee to the United States in 1993 following harassment over a story about sexual abuse on government-run trips. She first settled in Ames, Iowa, having known a professor at Iowa State University from a visit there.

López worked various jobs outside of journalism, eventually training as a nurse. After moving to Carroll and then finally to Denison, she noticed the lack of Spanish-language journalism available and used her tax return to set up La Prensa de Iowa in 2006. The newspaper has been noted for its success, being free or charge and funded solely by advertising, with López gaining a reputation for her coverage on the growth and concerns of immigrant communities in the region. In 2023, La Prensa picked up editor Gordon Wolf and journalist Dan Mundt after downsizing at the Denison Bulletin-Review led to their terminations. Wolf and Mundt became co-editors of The Denison Free Press, an English-language sister publication to La Prensa.
