= Rocío Mora =

Ecuadorian footballer (born 1989)

Personal information
- Full name: Rocío Lorena Mora Restrepo
- Date of birth: 25 December 1989 (age 36)
- Place of birth: Quito, Ecuador
- Positions: Left back; forward

Senior career*
Years	Team	Apps	(Gls)
- Liga de Quito
- El Nacional
- Espe
- Pichincha selection
- El Nacional

International career^{‡}
2010	Ecuador	1+	(0)
- * Club domestic league appearances and goals ‡ National team caps and goals as of 10 November 2010

Rocío Lorena Mora Restrepo (born 25 December 1989) is an Ecuadorian footballer who plays as a left back and a forward. She has been a member of the Ecuador women's national team.

== International career ==
Mora capped for Ecuador at senior level during the 2010 South American Women's Football Championship.
