= Edrit Viana =

Uruguayan footballer (born 1996)

Personal information
- Full name: Edrit Jaqueline Viana Silva
- Date of birth: 12 January 1996 (age 30)
- Position: Forward

Youth career
- 2014–2015: Colón

Senior career*
Years	Team	Apps	(Gls)
2014–2015	Colón	10	(10)
2015–2018	Peñarol	42	(43)

International career^{‡}
2014	Uruguay	2	(0)
- * Club domestic league appearances and goals ‡ National team caps and goals as of 13 September 2014

Edrit Jaqueline Viana Silva (born 12 January 1996) is a Uruguayan footballer who plays as a forward. She has been a member of the Uruguay women's national team.

== Club career ==
Viana played in Uruguay for Colón and Peñarol.

== International career ==
Viana played for Uruguay at senior level in the 2014 Copa América Femenina.
