= Karla Conga =

Peruvian footballer (born 1994)

Personal information
- Full name: Karla Indira Conga Lomas
- Date of birth: 23 January 1994 (age 32)
- Height: 1.65 m (5 ft 5 in)
- Position: Full back

Team information
- Current team: La Cantera

Senior career*
Years	Team	Apps	(Gls)
- Alianza Lima
- La Cantera

International career^{‡}
2014	Peru U20		
2014–	Peru	2	(0)
- * Club domestic league appearances and goals ‡ National team caps and goals as of 20 September 2014

Karla Indira Conga Lomas (born 23 January 1994) is a Peruvian footballer who plays as a full back for La Cantera and the Peru women's national team.

== International career ==
Conga represented Peru at the 2014 South American U-20 Women's Championship. At senior level, she played the 2014 Copa América Femenina.
