= María Cáceres =

Peruvian footballer (born 1996)

María José Cáceres
Personal information
- Full name: María José Cáceres Morales
- Date of birth: 11 June 1996 (age 30)
- Height: 1.68 m (5 ft 6 in)
- Positions: Right back; midfielder; forward

Team information
- Current team: Universitario
- Number: 4

Youth career
- River San Borja
- Independiente Surco - San Felipe
- Club Alianza Lima
- Sporting Cristal

Senior career*
Years	Team	Apps	(Gls)
- Universitario

International career^{‡}
2014–2015	Peru U20	1+	(0)
2017–	Peru	1	(0)
- * Club domestic league appearances and goals ‡ National team caps and goals as of 28 May 2017

María José Cáceres Morales (born 11 June 1996) is a Peruvian footballer who plays as a right back for Club Universitario de Deportes and the Peru women's national team.

== International career ==
Cáceres represented Peru at two South American U-20 Women's Championship editions (2014 South American U-20 Women's Championship and 2015). At senior level, she was part of the squad at the 2014 Copa América Femenina, but did not play. She appeared in a 0–12 friendly loss to Chile in 2017. played Copa Libertadores twice. Club Real Maracaná in Brazil 2014 and with the Universitario de Deportes in Paraguay 2017. At present he championed with Universitario de Deportes having an undefeated championship in the F League of Peru.
