= Inés Jhonson =

Ecuadorian footballer (born 1989)

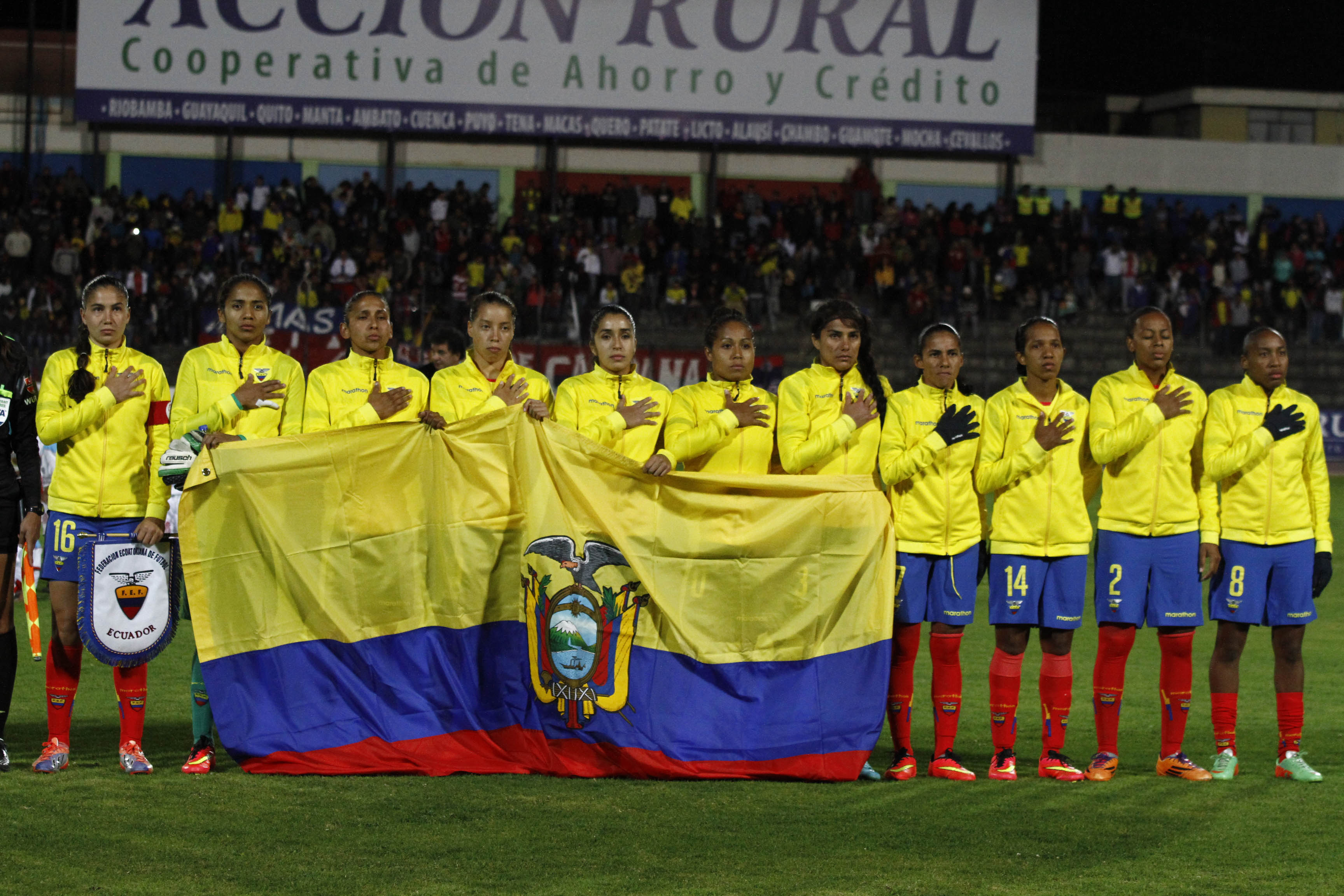
- Jhonson representing Ecuador at the 2014 Copa América Femenina

Personal information
- Full name: Inés María Jhonson Peña
- Date of birth: 10 December 1989 (age 36)
- Place of birth: Guayaquil, Ecuador
- Height: 1.64 m (5 ft 5 in)
- Positions: Defensive midfielder; central midfielder

Team information
- Current team: Deportivo Cuenca
- Number: 14

Senior career*
| Years | Team | Apps | (Gls) |
| 2007–2013 | Guayas selection | | |
| 2013–2015 | Rocafuerte FC | | |
| 2016–2017 | Unión Española | | |
| 2017 | Alianza | | |
| 2017–2019 | Unión Española | | |
| 2019– | Deportivo Cuenca | 24 | (9) |

International career^{‡}
| 2014 | Ecuador | 1 | (0) |
- * Club domestic league appearances and goals as of 28 September 2019 ‡ National team caps and goals as of 28 September 2014

Inés María Jhonson Peña (born 10 December 1989) is an Ecuadorian footballer who plays as a midfielder for Deportivo Cuenca. She was a member of the Ecuador women's national team.

== International career ==
Jhonson capped for Ecuador during the 2014 Copa América Femenina.
