= Sofía Carchipulla =

Ecuadorian footballer (born 1990)

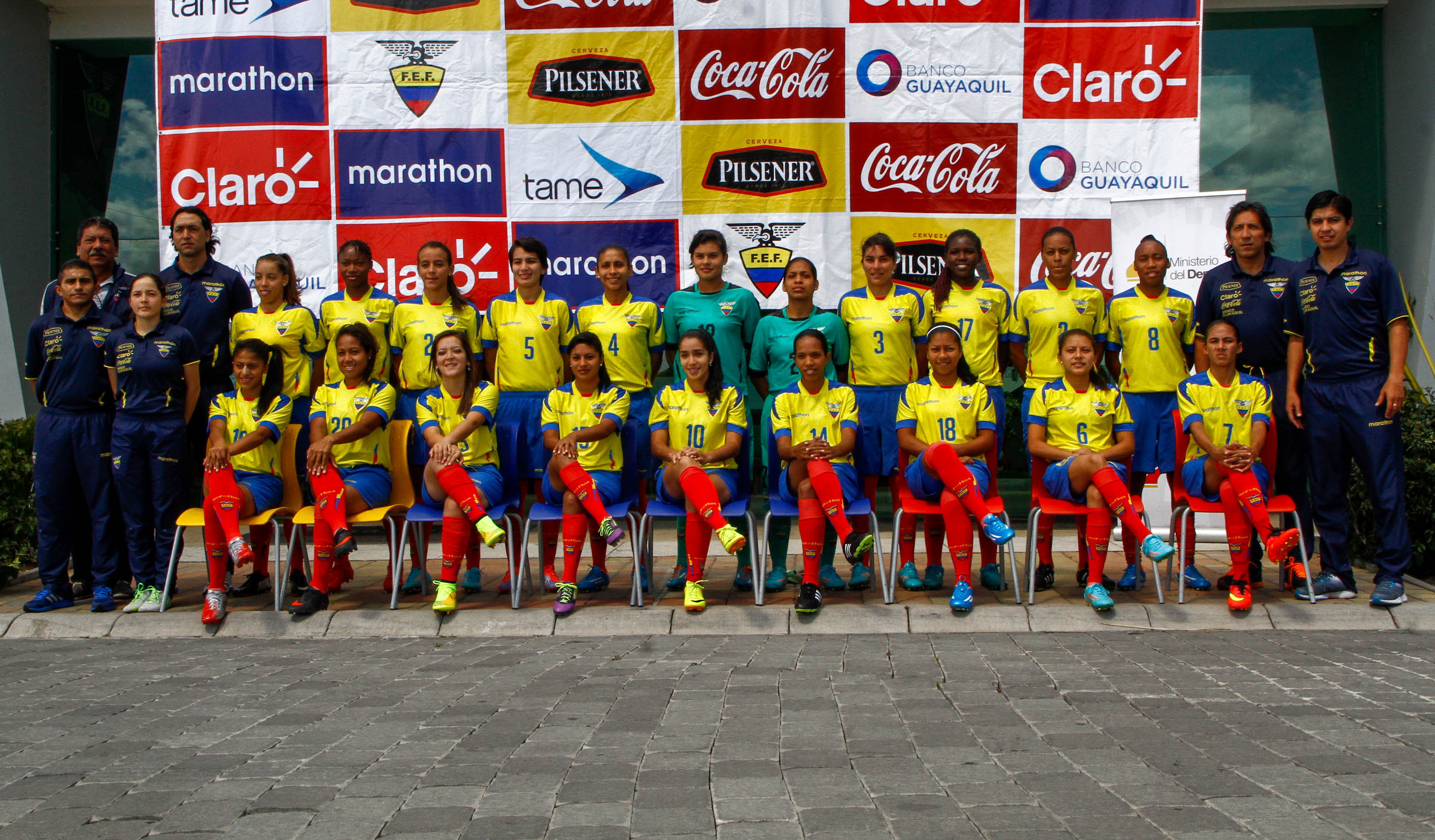

Personal information
- Full name: Sofía Carolina Carchipulla Enríquez
- Date of birth: 3 February 1990 (age 36)
- Place of birth: Babahoyo, Ecuador
- Position: Midfielder

Team information
- Current team: Independiente del Valle

Senior career*
Years	Team	Apps	(Gls)
2006–2013	Los Ríos selection		
2013	Pichincha selection		
2013–2014	L.D.U. Quito		
2014–2016	Universidad San Francisco		
2016	Manchester Cotopaxi		
2016	L.D.U. Quito		
2016–2017	Quito FC		
2017–2019	Universidad San Francisco	5	(0)
2019–	Independiente del Valle	1	(0)

International career^{‡}
2014	Ecuador	1	(0)
- * Club domestic league appearances and goals as of 3 May 2019 ‡ National team caps and goals as of 28 September 2014

Sofía Carolina Carchipulla Enríquez (born 3 February 1990) is an Ecuadorian footballer who plays as a midfielder for CSD Independiente del Valle. She has been a member of the Ecuador women's national team.

== International career ==
Carchipulla played for Ecuador at senior level in the 2014 Copa América Femenina.
