= Helen Maolo =

Bolivian footballer (born 1988)

Personal information
- Full name: Helen Mayerlin Maolo Gosálvez
- Date of birth: 23 December 1988 (age 37)
- Place of birth: Guayaramerín, Beni, Bolivia
- Height: 1.62 m (5 ft 4 in)
- Position: Centre back

Team information
- Current team: Mundo Futuro
- Number: 3

Senior career*
Years	Team	Apps	(Gls)
- Universidad Santa Cruz
- Mundo Futuro

International career^{‡}
2014–2017	Bolivia	4	(0)
- * Club domestic league appearances and goals ‡ National team caps and goals as of 9 April 2017

Helen Mayerlin Maolo Gosálvez (born 23 December 1988) is a Bolivian footballer who plays as a centre back for Mundo Futuro. She was a member of the Bolivia women's national team.

== Early life ==
Maolo is originally from the Beni Department and moved to the Santa Cruz Department.

== International career ==
Maolo played for Bolivia at senior level in the 2014 Copa América Femenina. She also played a friendly against Brazil in 2017.
