= Neiza Flores =

Bolivian footballer and futsal player (born 1989)

Personal information
- Full name: Neiza Flores Ferrufino
- Date of birth: 19 December 1989 (age 36)
- Place of birth: Cochabamba, Bolivia
- Height: 1.60 m (5 ft 3 in)
- Position: Midfielder

Senior career*
Years	Team	Apps	(Gls)
- Universitario San Simón
- Deportivo ITA

International career^{‡}
2006–2018	Bolivia	7	(0)
2018	Bolivia (futsal)		
Medal record
Women's futsal
Representing Bolivia
South American Games
Bronze medal – third place	2018 Cochabamba	Team
- * Club domestic league appearances and goals ‡ National team caps and goals as of 13 April 2018

Neiza Flores Ferrufino (born 19 December 1989) is a Bolivian futsal player and a footballer who plays as a midfielder for the Bolivia women's national team.

== Early life ==
Flores hails from the Cochabamba Department.

== International career ==
Flores played for Bolivia at senior level in three Copa América Femenina editions (2006, 2014 and 2018).

As a futsal player, Flores won the bronze medal with Bolivia at the 2018 South American Games.
