= Eduarda Cuiza =

Bolivian footballer (born 1980)

Personal information
- Full name: Eduarda Cuiza Lea
- Date of birth: 5 January 1980 (age 46)
- Height: 1.65 m (5 ft 5 in)
- Position: Forward

Senior career*
Years	Team	Apps	(Gls)
- Sinchi Wayra

International career^{‡}
2014–2018	Bolivia	2	(0)
- * Club domestic league appearances and goals ‡ National team caps and goals as of 13 April 2018

Eduarda Cuiza Lea (born 5 January 1980) is a Bolivian footballer who plays as a forward for the Bolivia women's national team.

== Early life ==
Cuiza hails from the Potosí Department.

== International career ==
Cuiza played for Bolivia at senior level in two Copa América Femenina editions (2014 and 2018).
