= Fiorella Valverde =

Peruvian footballer (born 1989)

Personal information
- Full name: Fiorella Valverde Salazar
- Date of birth: 22 January 1989 (age 37)
- Position: Goalkeeper

Team information
- Current team: Sporting Cristal

Senior career*
Years	Team	Apps	(Gls)
- Sporting Cristal

International career^{‡}
2010–	Peru	2	(0)
- * Club domestic league appearances and goals ‡ National team caps and goals as of 10 November 2010

Fiorella Valverde Salazar (born 22 January 1989) is a Peruvian footballer who plays as a goalkeeper for Sporting Cristal and the Peru women's national team.

== International career ==
Valverde capped for Peru at senior level during the 2010 South American Women's Football Championship.
