= Johanna Solís =

Ecuadorian footballer (born 1991)

Personal information
- Full name: Johanna Elizabeth Solís Sánchez
- Date of birth: 8 May 1991 (age 35)
- Place of birth: Guayaquil, Ecuador
- Position: Forward

International career^{‡}
Years	Team	Apps	(Gls)
2010	Ecuador	1+	(0)
- ‡ National team caps and goals as of 10 November 2010

Johanna Elizabeth Solís Sánchez (born 8 May 1991), known as Johanna Solís, is an Ecuadorian former footballer who played as a forward. She has been a member of the Ecuador women's national team.

== International career ==
Solís capped for Ecuador at senior level during the 2010 South American Women's Football Championship.
