= Virginia Ballesteros =

Bolivian footballer (born 1988)

Personal information
- Full name: Virginia Ballesteros Romano
- Date of birth: 25 September 1988 (age 38)
- Height: 1.55 m (5 ft 1 in)
- Position: Midfielder

International career^{‡}
Years	Team	Apps	(Gls)
2014	Bolivia	1	(0)
- ‡ National team caps and goals as of 12 September 2014

Virginia Ballesteros Romano (born 25 September 1988) is a Bolivian footballer who plays as a midfielder. She has been a member of the Bolivia women's national team.

== Early life ==
Ballesteros hails from the Potosí Department.

== International career ==
Ballesteros played for Bolivia at senior level in the 2014 Copa América Femenina.
