= Brianna Bellido =

Peruvian footballer (born 1993)

Personal information
- Full name: Brianna Fannua Bellido Sterner
- Date of birth: 17 January 1993 (age 33)
- Place of birth: United States
- Height: 1.73 m (5 ft 8 in)
- Position: Midfielder

Youth career
- Cumberland Valley Eagles

College career
Years	Team	Apps	(Gls)
2011	California Vulcans	14	(0)

International career^{‡}
2010	Peru U17		
2010	Peru	1	(0)
- ‡ National team caps and goals as of 8 November 2010.

Brianna Fannua Bellido Sterner (born 17 January 1993) is a former footballer who played as a midfielder. Born in the United States, she has been a member of the Peru national team.

== Early life ==
Bellido was raised in Mechanicsburg, Pennsylvania to a Peruvian father and an American mother.

== High school and college career ==
Bellido has attended the Cumberland Valley High School in her hometown and the California University of Pennsylvania in California, Pennsylvania.

== International career ==
Bellido represented Peru at the 2010 South American U-17 Women's Championship. She capped at senior level during the 2010 South American Women's Football Championship.
