= Jesús Fernández Vaquero =

Spanish politician (1953–2021)

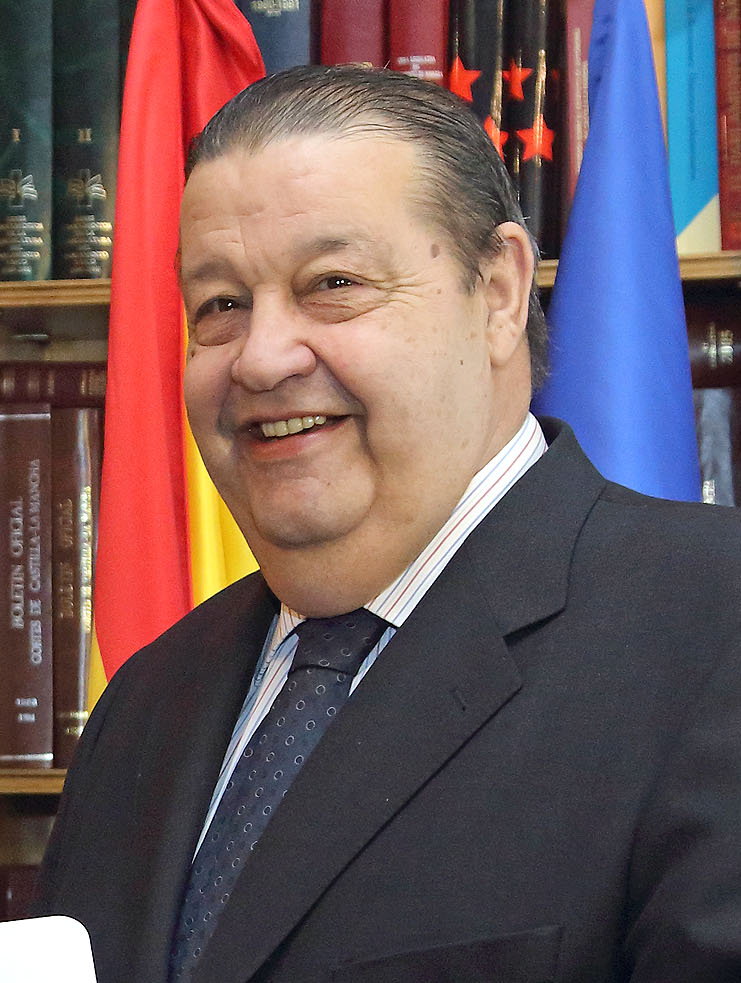
- Fernández Vaquero in January 2017
- Born: 16 August 1953; Turleque in the Province of Toledo, Castilla–La Mancha, Spain
- Died: 24 March 2021 (aged 67); Madrid, Spain
- Occupations: Schoolteacher and politician

Jesús Fernández Vaquero (16 August 1953 – 24 March 2021) was a Spanish school teacher and politician. He was a member of the Cortes of Castilla–La Mancha from 1999 to 2019, and served as the president of that legislative body from 2015 to 2019.

Vaquero was born in Turleque in the Province of Toledo, Castilla–La Mancha. He died on 24 March 2021.

He was Senator appointed by the Cortes from 2019 until his death.
