= Rebeca Romero =

Paraguayan footballer (born 1989)

Personal information
- Full name: Rommy Rebeca Romero Villalba
- Date of birth: 11 May 1989 (age 37)
- Height: 1.56 m (5 ft 1 in)
- Positions: Midfielder; defender

Senior career*
Years	Team	Apps	(Gls)
- Cerro Porteño

International career^{‡}
2014	Paraguay	1	(0)
- * Club domestic league appearances and goals ‡ National team caps and goals as of 14 September 2014

Rommy Rebeca Romero Villalba (born 11 May 1989), commonly known as Rebeca Romero, is a Paraguayan footballer who has played as a midfielder for Cerro Porteño and the Paraguay women's national team.

== International career ==
Romero played for Paraguay at senior level in the 2014 Copa América Femenina.
