= Ana Huanca =

Bolivian footballer (born 1986)

Personal information
- Full name: Ana Huanca Coaquira
- Date of birth: 20 October 1986 (age 40)
- Height: 1.53 m (5 ft 0 in)
- Positions: Forward; midfielder

Senior career*
Years	Team	Apps	(Gls)
- CD Enforma
- San Martín de Porres

International career^{‡}
2010–2018	Bolivia	6	(0)
- * Club domestic league appearances and goals ‡ National team caps and goals as of 13 April 2018

Ana Huanca Coaquira (born 20 October 1986) is a Bolivian footballer who plays as a forward for the Bolivia women's national team.

== Early life ==
Huanca hails from the Cochabamba Department.

== International career ==
Huanca played for Bolivia at senior level in three Copa América Femenina editions (2010, 2014 and 2018) and the 2014 South American Games.
