= Griselda Álvarez (footballer) =

Bolivian footballer (born 1982)

Personal information
- Full name: Griselda Antonia Álvarez Brigges
- Date of birth: 21 June 1982 (age 44)
- Height: 1.59 m (5 ft 3 in)
- Position: Defender

International career^{‡}
Years	Team	Apps	(Gls)
2010–2014	Bolivia	1	(0)
- ‡ National team caps and goals as of 14 September 2014

Griselda Antonia Álvarez Brigges (born 21 June 1982) is a Bolivian footballer who plays as a defender. She has been a member of the Bolivia women's national team.

== Early life ==
Álvarez hails from the Cochabamba Department.

== International career ==
Álvarez played for Bolivia at senior level in two Copa América Femenina editions (2010 and 2014).
