= Luciana Gómez (footballer, born 1984) =

Uruguayan footballer

Personal information
- Full name: Luciana Alexandra Gómez Del Río
- Date of birth: 22 September 1984 (age 42)
- Height: 1.78 m (5 ft 10 in)
- Position: Goalkeeper

Team information
- Current team: Rampla Juniors

Senior career*
Years	Team	Apps	(Gls)
2014–2015	Nacional	8	(0)
2015–2016	Peñarol	0	(0)
2017	Nacional	2	(0)
2019–	Rampla Juniors	20	(0)

International career^{‡}
2006–2014	Uruguay	10	(0)
- * Club domestic league appearances and goals ‡ National team caps and goals as of 19 September 2014

Luciana Alexandra Gómez Del Río (born 22 September 1984) is a Uruguayan footballer who plays as a goalkeeper for Rampla Juniors. She has been a member of the Uruguay women's national team.

== Club career ==
Gómez played in Uruguay for Nacional, Peñarol and Rampla Juniors.

== International career ==
An unused goalkeeper at the 2003 South American Women's Football Championship, Gómez played for Uruguay at senior level in two Copa América Femenina editions (2006 and 2014) and the 2007 Pan American Games.
