= Alejandra Montaño =

Bolivian footballer (born 1987)

Personal information
- Full name: Alejandra Frances Montaño Heredia
- Date of birth: 7 April 1987 (age 39)
- Height: 1.64 m (5 ft 5 in)
- Positions: Defender; midfielder

Senior career*
Years	Team	Apps	(Gls)
- Aurora

International career^{‡}
2010–2014	Bolivia	1	(0)
- * Club domestic league appearances and goals ‡ National team caps and goals as of 14 September 2014

Alejandra Frances Montaño Heredia (born 7 April 1987) is a Bolivian footballer who plays as a defender. She has been a member of the Bolivia women's national team.

== Early life ==
Montaño hails from the Cochabamba Department.

== International career ==
Montaño played for Bolivia at senior level in two Copa América Femenina editions (2010 and 2014).
