= 2026 Liga Femenina FPF =

Liga Femenina
- Season: 2026
- Dates: Torneo Apertura: 14 March - 17 July; Torneo Clausura: 22 July - 22 November
- Champions: Universitario (11th title)
- Runner up: Alianza Lima
- Relegated: Defensores del Ilucán; UNSAAC; Biavo
- 2027 Copa Libertadores: Universitario
- Matches: 126
- Goals: 486 (3.86 per match)
- Top goalscorer: (Brazil) Tamara Alves (26)

The 2026 Liga Femenina, also known as Liga Femenina Apuesta Total 2026 for sponsorship reasons, was the 28th season of the Peruvian Primera División Femenina, the highest level of Peruvian women's football.

On February 27, the fixture draw for the 2026 Liga Femenina took place. For this season, the organizers decided to divide the championship into three clearly defined stages: an Apertura Tournament and a Clausura Tournament, both played under the traditional round-robin format over 11 matchdays each, followed by the final stage of the competition.

Alianza Lima were the defending champions, having won two titles in a row in 2024 and 2025.

Universitario were crowned national champions after winning both the Apertura and Clausura tournaments.

== Teams ==
A total of 12 teams played in the 2026 Liga Femenina season, the top 10 teams that played in the previous 2025 season, plus the 2025 Liga de Ascenso Femenina champions Deportivo Yanapuma and the 2025 Liga de Ascenso Femenina runner-up Atlético Andahuaylas.

On 10 Match 2026 it was announced that Biavo decided to withdraw from the tournament, reducing the teams to 11.

=== Team changes ===
Promoted from 2025 Liga de Ascenso Femenina	Relegated from 2025 Liga Femenina	Retired
▲ Deportivo Yanapuma (1st) ▲ Atlético Andahuaylas (2nd)	▼ Real Áncash (11th) ▼ Universidad César Vallejo (12th)	▼ Biavo

=== Stadia and locations ===
Locations of the 2026 Liga Femenina teams

Team	City	Stadium	Capacity	Manager
Alianza Lima	Lima	Hugo Sotil; Alejandro Villanueva	13,773; 35,398	(Chile) José Letelier
Atlético Andahuaylas	Andahuaylas	Los Chankas	10,000	(Peru) Miguel Granados (Round 1-3) (Peru) Roger Pezo
Carlos A. Mannucci	Trujillo	Mansiche	25,036	(Peru) Orlando Balarezo (Round 1) (Peru) Robert Pérez
Defensores del Ilucán	Cutervo	Juan Maldonado Gamarra	12,000	(Peru) Ney Leyva
Deportivo Yanapuma	Iquitos	Max Augustín	24,576	(Colombia) John Ortega (Round 2-3) (Peru) Elías Díaz
Flamengo	Huancayo	Huancayo	20,000	(Peru) José Zevallos (Round 1-3) (Peru) Christian Arrazada
Killas	Lima	Andrés Bedoya Díaz	10,000	(Peru) Renzo Valdespino (Round 1) (Peru) Rodrigo Monge
Melgar	Arequipa	Virgen de Chapi	40,370	(Peru) Jorge Guerrero (Apertura) (Peru) Germán Rodríguez
Sporting Cristal	Lima	Alberto Gallardo	11,600	(Peru) Vivian Ayres (Apertura - Clausura: Round 6)
Universitario	Lima	Monumental	80,093	(Chile) Carlos Véliz
UNSAAC	Cusco	Garcilaso	45,056	(Peru) Marcos Medina (Round 1-2) (Peru) Roger Pezo (Round 3) (Peru) Wilbert Carbajal

== Torneo Apertura ==
=== Standings ===
Pos	Team	Pld	W	D	L	GF	GA	GD	Pts	Qualification
1	Universitario	10	9	1	0	55	4	+51	28	Advance to the Semifinals
2	Atlético Andahuaylas	10	8	1	1	14	8	+6	25	Advance to the Semifinals
3	Sporting Cristal	10	7	0	3	30	9	+21	21	Advance to the Quarterfinals
4	Alianza Lima	10	6	2	2	26	7	+19	20	Advance to the Quarterfinals
5	Deportivo Yanapuma	10	5	1	4	15	21	−6	16	Advance to the Quarterfinals
6	Melgar	10	4	2	4	15	14	+1	14	Advance to the Quarterfinals
7	Flamengo	10	3	2	5	16	21	−5	11	
8	Defensores del Ilucán	10	2	1	7	11	29	−18	7	
9	UNSAAC	10	1	3	6	7	25	−18	6	
10	Killas	10	1	2	7	14	26	−12	5	
11	Carlos A. Mannucci	10	1	1	8	4	43	−39	4	

Source: FPF, ADFP
Rules for classification: 1) Points; 2) Goal difference; 3) Goals for; 4) Drawing of lots.

=== Results ===
Home \ Away	ALI	AND	CAM	DEF	YAN	FLA	KIL	MEL	SCR	UNI	UNS
Alianza Lima						5–0	7–0		1–0	1–3	7–1
Atlético Andahuaylas	1–1				3–0	2–1			2–1		1–0
Carlos A. Mannucci	0–1	0–1					3–2	1–1		0–16	
Defensores del Ilucán	0–3	0–1	5–0				1–6	3–2			
Deportivo Yanapuma	2–0		6–0	3–0		1–0			0–4		2–0
Flamengo			3–0	3–0			3–2	1–2		2–2	
Killas		0–1			1–1			0–2		0–2	2–2
Melgar	0–0	1–2			3–0					0–3	4–0
Sporting Cristal			7–0	3–1		5–1	4–1	4–0			
Universitario		4–0		7–0	10–0				3–1		5–0
UNSAAC			1–0	1–1		2–2			0–1		

Source: FPF, ADFP
Legend: Blue = home team win; Yellow = draw; Red = away team win.

=== Bracket ===
Quarter-finals
4	Alianza Lima	4
5	Deportivo Yanapuma	1
3	Sporting Cristal	8
6	Melgar	1

Semi-finals
1	Universitario	0	3	3
4	Alianza Lima	1	0	1
2	Atlético Andahuaylas	1	2	3
3	Sporting Cristal	4	2	6

Final
1	Universitario	2	3	5
3	Sporting Cristal	2	1	3

=== Quarterfinals ===
20 June 2026
13:15

Sporting Cristal	8–1	Melgar
Tamara Alves 28' 50' 90+1'; Alessia Sanllehi 37'; Sofía Aguayo 62' (pen.); Giovanna Soares 64'; Rubí Acosta 65'; Ana Iraha 82'		Raquel Bilcape 32'

Estadio Alberto Gallardo, Lima
Referee: Milagros Arruela
21 June 2026
13:15

Alianza Lima	4–1	Deportivo Yanapuma
Nisa Marquinez 8'; Alisson Azabache 12'; Manisha Kalyan 46'; Sandy Dorador 68'		Dominic Escudero 10'

Estadio Hugo Sotil, Lima
Referee: Priscila Vásquez

=== Semifinals ===
==== First leg ====
27 June 2026
13:00

Alianza Lima	1–0	Universitario
Nisa Marquínez 37'

Estadio Hugo Sotil, Lima
Referee: Elizabeth Tintaya
28 June 2026
15:15

Sporting Cristal	4–1	Atlético Andahuaylas
Melanny Mondaca 15'; Tamara Alves 50' 76' 83'		Brenda Caminos 60'

Estadio Alberto Gallardo, Lima
Referee: Gaby Oncoy

==== Second leg ====
4 July 2026
18:00

Universitario	3–0	Alianza Lima
Pierina Núñez 3' (pen.) 71'; Sofía Oxandabarat 42'

Estadio Monumental "U", Lima
Referee: Milagros Arruela
5 July 2026
13:00

Atlético Andahuaylas	2–2	Sporting Cristal
Marleny Cárdenas 54'; Andrea Murillo 77'		Tamara Alves 45'; Milena Tomayconsa 80'

Estadio Los Chankas, Andahuaylas
Referee: César García

=== Finals ===
12 July 2026
15:15

Sporting Cristal	2–2	Universitario
Tamara Alves 7' 47'		Scarleth Flores 49'; Pierina Núñez 70'

Estadio Alberto Gallardo, Lima
Referee: Priscila Vásquez
17 July 2026
20:00

Universitario	3–1	Sporting Cristal
Sofía Oxandabarat 7'; Pierina Núñez 22' (pen.) 74'		Tamara Alves 31' (pen.)

Estadio Monumental "U", Lima
Referee: Daniel Ureta

Universitario won 5–3 on aggregate.

== Torneo Clausura ==
=== Standings ===
Pos	Team	Pld	W	D	L	GF	GA	GD	Pts	Qualification
1	Alianza Lima	10	10	0	0	33	2	+31	30	Advance to the Semifinals
2	Universitario	10	8	1	1	48	9	+39	25	Advance to the Semifinals
3	Melgar	10	7	0	3	28	10	+18	21	Advance to the Quarterfinals
4	Sporting Cristal	10	7	0	3	24	10	+14	21	Advance to the Quarterfinals
5	Atlético Andahuaylas	10	5	2	3	15	12	+3	17	Advance to the Quarterfinals
6	Carlos A. Mannucci	10	4	1	5	15	30	−15	13	Advance to the Quarterfinals
7	Killas	10	4	0	6	8	20	−12	12	
8	Flamengo	10	2	1	7	8	20	−12	7	
9	Deportivo Yanapuma	10	2	0	8	14	37	−23	6	
10	Defensores del Ilucán	10	2	0	8	8	39	−31	6	
11	UNSAAC	10	1	1	8	10	22	−12	4	

Source: FPF, ADFP
Rules for classification: 1) Points; 2) Goal difference; 3) Goals for; 4) Drawing of lots.

=== Results ===
Home \ Away	ALI	AND	CAM	DEF	YAN	FLA	KIL	MEL	SCR	UNI	UNS
Alianza Lima		2–0	6–0	10–0	2–0			1–0			
Atlético Andahuaylas			3–0	3–0			2–0	1–5		0–0	
Carlos A. Mannucci				1–0	4–2	2–2			1–2		3–1
Defensores del Ilucán					2–3	2–1			2–4	0–6	1–0
Deportivo Yanapuma		3–1					1–2	1–4		3–9	
Flamengo	0–2	1–2			3–0				0–1		1–0
Killas	0–3		0–3	3–1		1–0			0–4		
Melgar			2–1	8–0		5–0	1–0		0–3		
Sporting Cristal	0–2	0–2			6–0					1–3	3–0
Universitario	2–3		12–0			5–0	4–0	2–0			
UNSAAC	0–2	1–1			4–1		1–2	1–3		2–5	

Source: FPF, ADFP
Legend: Blue = home team win; Yellow = draw; Red = away team win.

=== Bracket ===
Quarter-finals
4	Sporting Cristal	2
5	Atlético Andahuaylas	1
3	Melgar	8
6	Carlos A. Mannucci	0

Semi-finals
1	Alianza Lima	1	1	2
4	Sporting Cristal	1	0	1
2	Universitario	0	7	7
3	Melgar	3	0	3

Final
1	Alianza Lima	1	1	2
2	Universitario	3	4	7

=== Quarterfinals ===
24 October 2026
14:00

Melgar	8–0	Carlos A. Mannucci
Sara Vargas 23' 28'; Raquel Bilcape 26'; María Quintero 32' 42'; Margarita Vásquez 35' 54'; Melicia Aguilar 65'

Estadio Monumental UNSA, Arequipa
Referee: Gerson Villamar
25 October 2026
15:15

Sporting Cristal	2–1	Atlético Andahuaylas
Melanny Mondaca 45+1'; Brenda Adrianzén 90+5'		Ana Cahuana 72'

Estadio Alberto Gallardo, Lima
Referee: Marcelo Parra

=== Semifinals ===
==== First leg ====
1 November 2026
15:00

Melgar	3–0	Universitario
Sara Vargas 30' 71'; Alba Soto 62'

Estadio Monumental UNSA, Arequipa
Referee: Alexander Blas
3 November 2026
15:00

Sporting Cristal	1–1	Alianza Lima
Tamara Alves 5'		Jackelin Saavedra 49'

Estadio Alberto Gallardo, Lima
Referee: Pablo López

==== Second leg ====
8 November 2026
13:00

Alianza Lima	1–0	Sporting Cristal
Daniela Montoya 56'

Estadio Alejandro Villanueva, Lima
Referee: Jair López
9 November 2026
15:00

Universitario	7–0	Melgar
Sofía Oxandabarat 16'; Stephanie Lacoste 34'; Alesia García 39' 75'; Cindy Novoa 45'; Claudia Dominguez 50' 77'

Estadio Monumental "U", Lima
Referee: Milagros Arruela

=== Finals ===
14 November 2026
15:00

Universitario	3–1	Alianza Lima
Stephanie Lacoste 12' (pen.); Sofía Oxandabarat 21' 58'		Allison Azabache 64' (pen.)

Estadio Monumental "U", Lima
Referee: Walter Guadalupe
22 November 2026
11:00

Alianza Lima	1–4	Universitario
Daniela Montoya 58'		Stephanie Lacoste 22'; Alesia García 25'; Claudia Domínguez 45' 82'

Estadio Alejandro Villanueva, Lima
Referee: Rudy Méndez

Universitario won 7–2 on aggregate.

== Aggregate table ==
Pos	Team	Pld	W	D	L	GF	GA	GD	Pts	Qualification or relegation
1	Universitario (C)	20	17	2	1	103	13	+90	53	Qualification for 2027 Copa Libertadores Femenina
2	Alianza Lima	20	16	2	2	59	9	+50	50	
3	Sporting Cristal	20	14	0	6	54	19	+35	42	
4	Atlético Andahuaylas	20	13	3	4	29	20	+9	42	
5	Melgar	20	11	2	7	43	24	+19	35	
6	Deportivo Yanapuma	20	7	1	12	29	58	−29	22	
7	Flamengo	20	5	3	12	24	41	−17	18	
8	Killas	20	5	2	13	22	46	−24	17	
9	Carlos A. Mannucci	20	5	2	13	21	73	−52	17	
10	Defensores del Ilucán (R)	20	4	1	15	19	70	−51	13	Relegation to 2027 Liga de Ascenso Femenina
11	UNSAAC (R)	20	2	4	14	17	47	−30	10	Relegation to 2027 Liga de Ascenso Femenina

Source: FPF, ADFP
Rules for classification: 1) Points; 2) Goal difference; 3) Goals for; 4) Drawing of lots.
(C) Champions; (R) Relegated

== Top scorers ==
As of 22 November 2026

Rank	Name	Club	Goals
1	(Brazil) Tamara Alves	Sporting Cristal	26
2	(Peru) Pierina Núñez	Universitario	25
3	(Uruguay) Sofia Oxandabarat	Universitario	24
4	(Peru) Raquel Bilcape	Melgar	16
5	(Colombia) Estefanía González	Alianza Lima	14
6	(Peru) Alessia Sanllehi	Sporting Cristal	13
7	(Peru) Margarita Vásquez	Melgar	11
7	(Uruguay) Stephanie Lacoste	Universitario	11
9	(Peru) Geraldine Cisneros	Universitario	10
9	(Venezuela) Luisana Pastrano	Killas	10
11	(Peru) Adriana Lúcar	Alianza Lima	9
11	(Colombia) Nisa Marquínez	Alianza Lima	9
11	(Colombia) Rubelys Perea	Flamengo	9
14	(Peru) Xioczana Canales	Universitario	8
14	(Uruguay) Daiana Farías	Melgar	8
14	(Brazil) Giovanna Soares	Sporting Cristal	8

== See also ==
- 2026 Liga de Ascenso Femenina
