= 2025 Liga Femenina FPF =

Liga Femenina
- Season: 2025
- Dates: Torneo Apertura: 28 March - 22 June; Torneo Clausura: 2 August - 15 November
- Champions: Alianza Lima (4th title)
- Relegated: Real Áncash; Universidad César Vallejo
- 2025 Copa Libertadores: Alianza Lima
- 2026 Copa Libertadores: Universitario

The 2025 Liga Femenina, also known as Liga Femenina Apuesta Total 2025 for sponsorship reasons, was the 27th season of the Peruvian Primera División Femenina, the highest level of Peruvian women's football. The season began on March and ended on 13 December with the final.

Alianza Lima were the defending champions. Alianza Lima defeated Universitario in the finals by an aggregate score of 5–3 to win their fourth tournament title.

== Teams ==
A total of 12 teams played in the 2025 Liga Femenina season, the top 10 teams that played in the previous 2024 season, plus the 2024 Liga de Ascenso Femenina champions Real Áncash and the 2024 Liga de Ascenso Femenina runner-up Flamengo.

=== Team changes ===
Promoted from 2024 Liga de Ascenso Femenina	Relegated from 2024 Liga Femenina
▲ Real Áncash (1st) ▲ Flamengo (2nd)	▼ Deportivo Municipal (11th) ▼ Ayacucho (12th) ▼ Academia Cantolao (13th)

=== Stadia and locations ===
Locations of the 2025 Liga Femenina teams

Team	City	Stadium	Capacity	Mannager
Alianza Lima	Lima	Hugo Sotil; Alejandro Villanueva	13,773; 35,398	(Chile) José Letelier
Biavo	San Martín	Carlos Vidaurre García	7,000	(Peru) Vladimir Vargas
Carlos A. Mannucci	Trujillo	Mansiche	25,036	(Peru) Luis Cordero
Defensores del Ilucán	Cutervo	Juan Maldonado Gamarra	12,000	(Peru) Miguel Cruzalegui
Flamengo	Huancayo	Huancayo	20,000	(Peru) Marcos Medina
Killas	Lima	Andrés Bedoya Díaz	10,000	(Peru) Gerardo Calero
Melgar	Arequipa	Virgen de Chapi	40,370	(Peru) Willy Escapa
Real Áncash	Huaraz	Rosas Pampa	18,000	(Peru) Celestino Huaranga
Sporting Cristal	Lima	Alberto Gallardo	11,600	(Peru) Vivian Ayres
Universidad César Vallejo	Trujillo	Mansiche	25,036	(Peru) Luis Montalván
Universitario	Lima	Monumental	80,093	(Colombia) Andrés Usme
UNSAAC	Cusco	Estadio Garcilaso	45,056	(Peru) Roger Pezo

== Torneo Apertura ==
=== Standings ===
Pos	Team	Pld	W	D	L	GF	GA	GD	Pts	Qualification
1	Universitario	11	10	1	0	46	2	+44	31	Advance to the Semifinals
2	Alianza Lima	11	9	1	1	52	4	+48	28	Advance to the Semifinals
3	Sporting Cristal	11	8	2	1	48	7	+41	26	Advance to the Quarterfinals
4	Melgar	11	4	4	3	17	18	−1	16	Advance to the Quarterfinals
5	Defensores del Ilucán	11	4	4	3	16	32	−16	16	Advance to the Quarterfinals
6	Biavo	11	3	4	4	23	20	+3	13	Advance to the Quarterfinals
7	Killas	11	4	1	6	12	29	−17	13	
8	Carlos A. Mannucci	11	3	3	5	14	20	−6	12	
9	Flamengo	11	4	0	7	18	26	−8	12	
10	Real Áncash	11	3	0	8	15	38	−23	9	
11	UNSAAC	11	1	3	7	12	27	−15	6	
12	Universidad César Vallejo	11	0	3	8	0	50	−50	3	

Source: FPF, ADFP
Rules for classification: 1) Points; 2) Goal difference; 3) Goals for; 4) Drawing of lots.

=== Results ===
Home \ Away	ALI	BIA	CAM	DEF	KIL	FLA	MEL	ANC	SCR	UCV	UNI	UNS
Alianza Lima				11–0			6–0		1–1		0–1	4–0
Biavo	1–3		2–2			3–1		3–0		8–0		
Carlos A. Mannucci	0–5			1–1	1–0			4–1		4–0		
Defensores del Ilucán		1–1			2–0		1–1			3–0		1–1
Killas	0–7	3–1				2–0		3–1	0–4			2–1
Flamengo	1–3		3–1	2–3				4–1			0–3	
Melgar		1–1	0–0		4–2	2–1			3–2			5–0
Real Áncash	0–3			1–4			2–1			5–0	1–6	3–2
Sporting Cristal		4–1	2–0	8–0		6–0		8–0			1–1	
Universidad César Vallejo	0–9				0–0	0–2	0–0		0–10			0–0
Universitario		3–0	3–0	6–0	8–0		3–0			9–0		
UNSAAC		2–2	3–1			2–4			1–2		0–3	

Source: FPF, ADFP
Legend: Blue = home team win; Yellow = draw; Red = away team win.

=== Bracket ===
Quarter-finals
4	Melgar	5
5	Defensores del Ilucán	1
3	Sporting Cristal	4
6	Biavo	2

Semi-finals
1	Universitario	2	3	5
4	Melgar	0	0	0
2	Alianza Lima	1	2	3
3	Sporting Cristal	0	0	0

Final
1	Universitario	0	0	0
2	Alianza Lima	0	2	2

=== Quarterfinals ===
7 June 2025
12:00

Sporting Cristal	4–2	Biavo
Rubi Acosta 11'; Karol Murcia 24' 52'; Milena Tomayconsa 55'		Ester Díaz 9'; Larissa Araujo 79'

La Florida, Lima
Referee: Johanna Vega
7 June 2025
15:00

Melgar	5–1	Defensores del Ilucán
Anyela Martínez 14'; Raquel Bilcape 19' 38'; Alexa Zevallos 77'; Ayumi Bustamante 90+1'		Tiffany Martínez 40'

CAR Melgar, Arequipa
Referee: Yoselin Campo

=== Semifinals ===
==== First leg ====
11 June 2025
12:30

Melgar	0–2	Universitario
		Pierina Núñez 28' 56'

Estadio Monumental Virgen de Chapi, Arequipa
Referee: Flor Carazas
11 June 2025
15:00

Sporting Cristal	0–1	Alianza Lima
		Alison Reyes 29'

Estadio Alberto Gallardo, Lima
Referee: Gaby Oncoy

==== Second leg ====
15 June 2025
12:00

Universitario	3–0	Melgar
Luz Campoverde 24'; Xioczana Canales 39'; Karen Páez 46'

Campo Mar U, Lima
Referee: Ingrid Rodríguez
15 June 2025
15:00

Alianza Lima	2–0	Sporting Cristal
Adriana Lúcar 13' (pen.); Annaysa Silva 45'

Estadio Hugo Sotil, Lima
Referee: Maykol Farromeque

=== Finals ===
18 June 2025
20:00

Alianza Lima	0–0	Universitario

Estadio Alejandro Villanueva, Lima
Referee: Johanna Vega
22 June 2025
15:00

Universitario	0–2	Alianza Lima
		Annaysa Silva 45+5' (pen.); Silvani Oliveira 59'

Estadio Monumental "U", Lima
Referee: Milagros Arruela

Alianza Lima won 2–0 on aggregate.

== Torneo Clausura ==
=== Standings ===
Pos	Team	Pld	W	D	L	GF	GA	GD	Pts	Qualification
1	Alianza Lima	11	10	0	1	36	6	+30	30	Advance to the Semifinals
2	Universitario	11	9	0	2	43	6	+37	27	Advance to the Semifinals
3	Sporting Cristal	11	7	2	2	28	9	+19	23	Advance to the Quarterfinals
4	Carlos A. Mannucci	11	7	2	2	28	13	+15	23	Advance to the Quarterfinals
5	UNSAAC	11	6	1	4	22	13	+9	19	Advance to the Quarterfinals
6	Melgar	11	5	3	3	14	16	−2	18	Advance to the Quarterfinals
7	Flamengo	11	4	3	4	14	16	−2	15	
8	Biavo	11	3	1	7	10	32	−22	10	
9	Universidad César Vallejo	11	2	2	7	11	25	−14	8	
10	Killas	11	1	3	7	9	29	−20	6	
11	Real Áncash	11	2	0	9	15	40	−25	6	
12	Defensores del Ilucán	11	1	1	9	11	36	−25	4	

Source: FPF, ADFP
Rules for classification: 1) Points; 2) Goal difference; 3) Goals for; 4) Drawing of lots.

=== Results ===
Home \ Away	ALI	BIA	CAM	DEF	KIL	FLA	MEL	ANC	SCR	UCV	UNI	UNS
Alianza Lima		10–0	1–0		4–0	3–1		7–0		3–0		
Biavo				1–0	1–1		4–2		1–5		0–3	0–1
Carlos A. Mannucci		2–1				3–0	1–1		2–2		1–4	3–0
Defensores del Ilucán	0–1		3–4			1–2		3–2	1–1		0–9	
Killas			1–3	4–1			0–0			1–1	1–4	
Flamengo		3–0			3–0		0–0		1–2	0–0		0–0
Melgar	2–3			2–1				3–2		1–0	1–0	
Real Áncash		4–0	0–4		5–0	0–4			1–3			
Sporting Cristal	0–1				2–0		4–0			6–0		3–0
Universidad César Vallejo		1–2	0–5	4–1				4–1			0–2	
Universitario	1–2					7–0		9–0	2–0			2–1
UNSAAC	2–1			6–0	5–1		1–2	3–0		3–1		

Source: FPF, ADFP
Legend: Blue = home team win; Yellow = draw; Red = away team win.

=== Bracket ===
Quarter-finals
4	Carlos A. Mannucci	2
5	UNSAAC	0
3	Sporting Cristal	3
6	Melgar	1

Semi-finals
1	Alianza Lima	2	3	5
4	Carlos A. Mannucci	0	0	0
2	Universitario	0	6	6
3	Sporting Cristal	0	0	0

Final
1	Alianza Lima	0	1	1 (2)
2	Universitario	0	1	1 (4)

=== Quarterfinals ===
12 October 2025
10:00

Carlos A. Mannucci	2–0	UNSAAC
Maribel Portillo 62'; Alessia Sanllehi 90+4' (pen.)

Estadio Mansiche, Trujillo
Referee: Johanna Vega
12 October 2025
12:30

Sporting Cristal	3–1	Melgar
Danna Lambraño 2'; Karol Murcia 56' 83'		Mercy Carrillo 17'

Estadio Alberto Gallardo, Lima
Referee: Priscila Vásquez

=== Semifinals ===
==== First leg ====
19 October 2025
11:00

Sporting Cristal	0–0	Universitario

Estadio Alberto Gallardo, Lima
Referee: Gaby Oncoy
19 October 2025
15:00

Carlos A. Mannucci	0–2	Alianza Lima
		Rafaela Marques 54'; Silvani Oliveira 76'

Estadio Mansiche, Trujillo
Referee: Priscila Vásquez

==== Second leg ====
2 November 2025
12:30

Universitario	6–0	Sporting Cristal
Karen Páez 9'; Cindy Novoa 21' 31'; María Usme 54' (pen.); Luz Campoverde 57'; Valerie Gherson 66'

CampoMar U, Lima
Referee: Elizabeth Tintaya
2 November 2025
15:00

Alianza Lima	3–0	Carlos A. Mannucci
Nayeli Cabezas 17' (o.g.); Silvani Oliveira 48'; Allison Azabache 67'

Estadio Alejandro Villanueva, Lima
Referee: Soledad Ecos

=== Finals ===
9 November 2025
15:00

Universitario	0–0	Alianza Lima

CampoMar U, Lima
Referee: Julio Quiroz
15 November 2025
15:00

Alianza Lima	1–1	Universitario
Sashenka Porras 90+7'		Karen Páez 77'
Penalties
Neidy Romero (penalty missed); Sashenka Porras (penalty scored); Mia León (penalty scored); Rafaela Marques (penalty missed)	2–4	María Usme (penalty scored); Gisela Pino (penalty scored); Cindy Novoa (penalty scored); Scarleth Flores (penalty scored)

Estadio Alejandro Villanueva, Lima
Referee: Milagros Arruela

Universitario won 4–2 on penalty kicks.

== Title Playoff ==
7 December 2025
15:00

Alianza Lima	3–1	Universitario
Silvani Oliveira 17'; Sandy Dorador 29'; Grace Cagnina 90'		Catalina Usme 48' (pen.)

Estadio Alejandro Villanueva, Lima
Referee: Víctor Cori
13 December 2025
15:00

Universitario	2–2	Alianza Lima
Catalina Usme 44' (pen.); Kimbherly Flores 90+1'		Yomira Tacilla 27'; Neidy Romero 81'

Villa Deportiva de Universitario, Lima
Referee: Jordi Espinoza

Alianza Lima won 5–3 on aggregate.

== Aggregate table ==
Pos	Team	Pld	W	D	L	GF	GA	GD	Pts	Qualification or relegation
1	Universitario	22	19	1	2	89	8	+81	58	Qualification for 2026 Copa Libertadores Femenina
2	Alianza Lima (C)	22	19	1	2	88	10	+78	58	Qualification for 2025 Copa Libertadores Femenina
3	Sporting Cristal	22	15	4	3	76	16	+60	49	
4	Melgar	22	9	7	6	31	34	−3	34	
5	Carlos A. Mannucci	22	10	5	7	42	33	+9	35	
6	Flamengo	22	8	3	11	32	42	−10	27	
7	UNSAAC	22	7	4	11	34	40	−6	25	
8	Biavo	22	6	5	11	33	52	−19	23	
9	Defensores del Ilucán	22	5	5	12	27	68	−41	20	
10	Killas	22	5	4	13	21	58	−37	19	
11	Real Áncash (R)	22	5	0	17	30	78	−48	15	Relegation to 2026 Liga de Ascenso Femenina
12	Universidad César Vallejo (R)	22	2	5	15	11	75	−64	11	Relegation to 2026 Liga de Ascenso Femenina

Source: FPF, ADFP
Rules for classification: 1) Points; 2) Goal difference; 3) Goals for; 4) Drawing of lots.
(C) Champions; (R) Relegated

== Top scorers ==
Rank	Name	Club	Goals
1	(Peru) Pierina Núñez	Universitario	24
2	(Colombia) Karol Murcia	Sporting Cristal	22
3	(Peru) Adriana Lúcar	Alianza Lima	21
4	(Peru) Milena Tomayconsa	Sporting Cristal	15
5	(Peru) Gavi Gonzáles	Biavo	14
6	(Colombia) Karen Páez	Universitario	14
7	(Peru) Raquel Bilcape	Melgar	13
8	(Brazil) Annaysa Silva	Alianza Lima	12

== See also ==
- 2025 Liga de Ascenso Femenina
