= 2023 Liga Femenina FPF =

Liga Femenina
- Season: 2023
- Dates: Regular stage: 2 April – 26 June; Play-offs: 1 July – 2 September
- Champions: Universitario; 10th title
- Relegated: Atlético Trujillo; Universidad San Martín
- Copa Libertadores: Universitario
- Top goalscorer: Adriana Lúcar (17 goals)

The 2023 Liga Femenina, also known as Liga Femenina Apuesta Total 2023 for sponsorship reasons, was the 25th season of the Peruvian Primera División Femenina, the highest level of Peruvian women's football. The season began on 1 April and ended on 2 September with the final.

Alianza Lima were the defending champions. As champions, Universitario qualified for the 2023 Copa Libertadores Femenina.

== Teams ==
A total of 14 teams played in the 2023 Liga Femenina season, the top 11 teams that played in the previous 2022 season, plus the 2022 Copa Perú Femenina champions Melgar, the 2022 Copa Perú Femenina runner-up Defensores del Ilucán and Sporting Victoria, the winners of the promotion/relegation play-off.

=== Team changes ===
Promoted from 2022 Copa Perú Femenina	Relegated from 2022 Liga Femenina
▲ Melgar (1st) ▲ Defensores del Ilucán (2nd)	▼UTC (12th) ▼ Sport Boys (13th)

=== Stadia and locations ===
Locations of the 2023 Liga Femenina teams

Team	City	Stadium	Capacity	Mannager
Academia Cantolao	Callao	Miguel Grau	17,000	(Peru) Germán Rodríguez
Alianza Lima	Lima	Alejandro Villanueva	35,000	(Colombia) John Alber Ortiz
Atlético Trujillo	Trujillo	Mansiche	25,000	(Peru) Ronald Araujo
Ayacucho	Ayacucho	Ciudad de Cumaná	15,000	(Peru) Hugo Rodríguez
Carlos A. Mannucci	Trujillo	Mansiche	25,000	(Peru) Luis Cordero
Defensores del Ilucán	Cutervo	Juan Maldonado Gamarra	12,000	(Peru) Alex Celis
Deportivo Municipal	Lima	Iván Elías Moreno	10,000	(Peru) Víctor García (Round 1-5) (Peru) Luccina Aparicio (Round 6) (Peru) Vivian Ayres (since Round 7)
Killas	Lima	Andrés Bedoya Díaz	10,000	(Peru) Olienka Salinas
Melgar	Arequipa	Virgen de Chapi	60,000	(Peru) Javier Uturunco
Sporting Cristal	Lima	Alberto Gallardo	18,000	(Peru) Gabriela León
Sporting Victoria	Iquitos	Max Augustín	24,000	(Peru) Víctor Ríos
Universidad César Vallejo	Trujillo	Mansiche	25,000	(Peru) Luis Montalván
Universidad San Martín	Lima	Alberto Gallardo	18,000	(Peru) Kely Figueredo
Universitario	Lima	Monumental	80,093	(Colombia) John Tierradentro

== Regular stage ==
=== Standings ===
Pos	Team	Pld	W	D	L	GF	GA	GD	Pts	Qualification
1	Universitario	13	13	0	0	62	4	+58	39	Advance to Championship play-offs
2	Alianza Lima	13	11	1	1	54	3	+51	34	Advance to Championship play-offs
3	Carlos A. Mannucci	13	10	0	3	29	14	+15	30	Advance to Championship play-offs
4	Sporting Cristal	13	7	3	3	27	12	+15	24	Advance to Championship play-offs
5	Deportivo Municipal	13	7	1	5	23	24	−1	22	Advance to Championship play-offs
6	Academia Cantolao	13	6	3	4	16	11	+5	21	Advance to Championship play-offs
7	Defensores del Ilucán	13	6	2	5	19	24	−5	20	Advance to Relegation play-offs
8	Melgar	13	5	2	6	19	33	−14	17	Advance to Relegation play-offs
9	Sporting Victoria	13	4	1	8	18	20	−2	13	Advance to Relegation play-offs
10	Ayacucho	13	3	4	6	17	31	−14	13	Advance to Relegation play-offs
11	Atlético Trujillo	13	4	0	9	20	45	−25	12	Advance to Relegation play-offs
12	Killas	13	2	3	8	14	28	−14	9	Advance to Relegation play-offs
13	Universidad César Vallejo	13	1	3	9	11	30	−19	6	Advance to Relegation play-offs
14	Universidad San Martín	13	0	1	12	5	51	−46	1	Advance to Relegation play-offs

Source: FPF, ADFP
Rules for classification: 1) Points; 2) Goal difference; 3) Goals for; 4) Drawing of lots.

=== Results ===
The match schedule was decided based on the draw which was held on 16 March 2023.

Home \ Away	ALI	ATR	AYA	CAN	CAM	DEF	MUN	KIL	MEL	SCR	VIC	UCV	USM	UNI
Alianza Lima		6–0						9–1	9–0	3–0		5–1	8–0	
Atlético Trujillo			4–2	0–5		1–2				0–2	2–0		3–1	
Ayacucho	0–0			0–2		3–3			1–2	1–0	1–3	3–0		
Academia Cantolao	0–3					2–0			0–0	0–0	2–1			0–2
Carlos A. Mannucci	0–3	6–1	6–1	2–0			2–1	1–0					2–0	
Defensores del Ilucán	0–3				0–2				4–0	2–2	1–0	2–1		0–7
Deportivo Municipal	0–4	2–1	2–2	2–0		3–0		2–1					4–0	
Killas		1–3	2–2	0–1		0–1					2–0		4–0	
Melgar		5–3			1–2		3–1	1–1					3–1	0–8
Sporting Cristal					2–1		7–1	4–1	2–0			4–0		0–1
Sporting Victoria	0–1				1–2		0–2		4–2	2–2		1–0		1–2
Universidad César Vallejo		3–2			1–2		1–2	1–1	1–2					1–5
Universidad San Martín			0–1	1–4		0–4				0–2	1–5	1–1		
Universitario	1–0	10–0	7–0		3–1		3–1	3–0					10–0	

Source: FPF, ADFP
Legend: Blue = home team win; Yellow = draw; Red = away team win.

== Play-offs ==
=== Championship play-offs ===
In the championship play-offs, teams ranked 1st and 2nd in the regular stage started with 2 and 1 extra points respectively. Points earned during the regular stage did not carry over during the hexagonal.

==== Hexagonal table ====
Pos	Team	Pld	W	D	L	GF	GA	GD	Pts	Qualification	UNI	ALI	CAM	CRI	MUN	CAN
1	Universitario	5	4	0	1	13	4	+9	14	Advance to semi-finals				2–0	6–0	3–0
2	Alianza Lima	5	4	0	1	17	5	+12	13	Advance to semi-finals	4–1				3–1	8–0
3	Carlos A. Mannucci	5	3	1	1	5	1	+4	10	Advance to semi-finals	0–1	2–0		1–0		
4	Sporting Cristal	5	2	0	3	7	6	+1	6	Advance to semi-finals		1–2				3–0
5	Deportivo Municipal	5	1	1	3	4	13	−9	4				0–0	1–3		
6	Academia Cantolao	5	0	0	5	1	18	−17	0				0–2		1–2	

Updated to match(es) played on 2023. Source: FPF
Legend: Blue = home team win; Yellow = draw; Red = away team win.

=== Bracket ===
The semi-final matchups were:

- SF1: Hexagonal 1st place vs. Hexagonal 4th place
- SF2: Hexagonal 2nd place vs. Hexagonal 3rd place

Semifinals
1	Universitario	4	3	7
4	Sporting Cristal	1	0	1
2	Alianza Lima	1	2	3
3	Carlos A. Mannucci	0	0	0

Finals
Universitario	0	2	2
Alianza Lima	1	0	1

=== Semi-finals ===
In the semi-finals, if a match was level at the end of normal 90 minutes playing time, extra time was not played and a penalty shoot-out was used to determine the winners.

==== First leg ====
12 August 2023
13:00

Carlos A. Mannucci	0–1	Alianza Lima
		Sashenka Porras 47'

Estadio Mansiche, Trujillo
Referee: Juber Barboza
13 August 2023
10:30

Sporting Cristal	1–4	Universitario
Karen López 16'		Scarleth Flores 21'; Stephanie Lacoste 48'; Nahomi Martínez 62'; Luz Campoverde 72'

La Florida, Lima
Referee: Walter Guadalupe

==== Second leg ====
19 August 2023
13:00

Alianza Lima	2–0	Carlos A. Mannucci
Heidy Padilla 8'; Yoshira Tacilla 90'

Estadio Alejandro Villanueva, Lima
Referee: Lenin Montalván
20 August 2023
13:00

Universitario	3–0	Sporting Cristal
Cindy Novoa 44'; Scarleth Flores 74'; Xioczana Canales 90+1'

Estadio Monumental, Lima
Referee: Brandon Torrecilla

=== Finals ===
27 August 2023
18:00

Alianza Lima	1–0	Universitario
Heidy Padilla 24'	Report

Estadio Alejandro Villanueva, Lima
Attendance: 26,804
Referee: Jordi Espinoza
2 September 2023
19:00

Universitario	2–0	Alianza Lima
Lacoste 75'; Luz Campoverde 80'	Report

Estadio Monumental, Lima
Attendance: 42,107
Referee: Bruno Pérez

=== Relegation play-offs ===
In the relegation play-offs, teams ranked 13th and 14th in the regular stage started with 1 and 2 less points respectively. Points earned during the regular stage did not carry over during the play-offs.

==== Group A ====
Pos	Team	Pld	W	D	L	GF	GA	GD	Pts	Qualification	UCV	DEF	VIC	ATR
1	Universidad César Vallejo	6	4	1	1	9	8	+1	13			2–1	3–2	2–1
2	Defensores del Ilucán	6	4	0	2	14	6	+8	12		4–0		3–0	3–1
3	Sporting Victoria	6	3	1	2	9	8	+1	10		0–0	2–1		3–0
4	Atlético Trujillo (R)	6	0	0	6	4	14	−10	−1	Relegation to 2024 Liga de Ascenso Femenina	0–2	1–2	1–2	

Updated to match(es) played on 2023. Source: FPF
Legend: Blue = home team win; Yellow = draw; Red = away team win.
(R) Relegated

==== Group B ====
Pos	Team	Pld	W	D	L	GF	GA	GD	Pts	Qualification	MEL	KIL	AYA	USM
1	Melgar	6	4	1	1	12	6	+6	13			3–2	4–1	3–1
2	Killas	6	3	2	1	13	6	+7	11		0–0		5–1	4–2
3	Ayacucho	6	2	0	4	11	15	−4	6		0–1	0–2		3–2
4	Universidad San Martín (R)	6	1	1	4	8	16	−8	2	Relegation to 2024 Liga de Ascenso Femenina	2–1	0–0	1–6	

Updated to match(es) played on 2023. Source: FPF
Legend: Blue = home team win; Yellow = draw; Red = away team win.
(R) Relegated

== Top scorers ==
Rank	Name	Club	Goals
1	(Peru) Adriana Lúcar	Alianza Lima	17
2	(Peru) Luz Campoverde	Universitario	15
3	(Peru) Alondra Vílchez	Sporting Cristal	12
4	(Peru) Yomira Tacilla	Alianza Lima	11
5	(Peru) Nahomi Martínez	Universitario	11
6	(Uruguay) Stephanie Lacoste	Universitario	11

== See also ==
- 2023 Liga de Ascenso Femenina
