= 2024 Liga Femenina FPF =

Liga Femenina
- Season: 2024
- Dates: Regular stage: 22 March – 26 June; Play-offs: 1 July – 30 August
- Champions: Alianza Lima (3rd title)
- Relegated: Deportivo Municipal; Ayacucho; Academia Cantolao
- Copa Libertadores: Alianza Lima
- Top goalscorer: Adriana Lúcar (20 goals)

The 2024 Liga Femenina, also known as Liga Femenina Apuesta Total 2024 for sponsorship reasons, was the 26th season of the Peruvian Primera División Femenina, the highest level of Peruvian women's football. The season began on 1 April and ended on 30 August with the final.

Universitario were the defending champions. As champions, Alianza Lima qualified for the 2024 Copa Libertadores Femenina.

The club Sporting Victoria from Iquitos withdrew before the start the season due to financial problems.

== Teams ==
A total of 13 teams played in the 2024 Liga Femenina season, the top 11 teams that played in the previous 2023 season, plus the 2023 Liga de Ascenso Femenina champions Biavo and the 2023 Liga de Ascenso Femenina runner-up UNSAAC.

=== Team changes ===
Promoted from 2023 Liga de Ascenso Femenina	Relegated from 2023 Liga Femenina
▲ Biavo (1st) ▲UNSAAC (2nd)	▼ Universidad San Martín (13th) ▼ Atlético Trujillo (14th) ▼ Sporting Victoria (Retired)

=== Stadia and locations ===
Locations of the 2024 Liga Femenina teams

Team	City	Stadium	Capacity	Mannager
Academia Cantolao	Callao	Miguel Grau	17,000	(Peru) Germán Rodríguez
Alianza Lima	Lima	Alejandro Villanueva	35,398	(Chile) José Letelier
Ayacucho	Ayacucho	Ciudad de Cumaná	15,000	(Peru) Hugo Rodríguez
Biavo	San Martín	Carlos Vidaurre García	7,000	(Peru) Ruber Guerrero
Carlos A. Mannucci	Trujillo	Mansiche	25,036	(Peru) Luis Cordero
Defensores del Ilucán	Cutervo	Juan Maldonado Gamarra	12,000	(Peru) Alex Celis
Deportivo Municipal	Lima	Iván Elías Moreno	11,000	(Peru) Vivian Ayres
Killas	Lima	Andrés Bedoya Díaz	10,000	(Peru) Olienka Salinas
Melgar	Arequipa	Virgen de Chapi	40,370	(Peru) Víctor Balta
Sporting Cristal	Lima	Alberto Gallardo	11,600	(Peru) Gabriela León
Universidad César Vallejo	Trujillo	Mansiche	25,036	(Peru) Luis Montalván
Universitario	Lima	Monumental	80,093	(Colombia) John Tierradentro
UNSAAC	Cusco	Estadio Garcilaso	45,056	(Peru) Alex Willyans Jallo Condori

== Regular stage ==
=== Standings ===
Pos	Team	Pld	W	D	L	GF	GA	GD	Pts	Qualification
1	Alianza Lima	12	11	1	0	59	4	+55	34	Advance to Championship play-offs
2	Universitario	12	11	1	0	49	8	+41	34	Advance to Championship play-offs
3	Sporting Cristal	12	8	1	3	26	9	+17	25	Advance to Championship play-offs
4	Melgar	12	7	2	3	20	8	+12	23	Advance to Championship play-offs
5	Carlos A. Mannucci	12	7	1	4	22	11	+11	22	Advance to Championship play-offs
6	Defensores del Ilucán	12	5	2	5	16	19	−3	17	Advance to Championship play-offs
7	Deportivo Municipal	12	5	2	5	11	20	−9	17	Advance to Relegation play-offs
8	Killas	12	4	1	7	11	28	−17	13	Advance to Relegation play-offs
9	Universidad César Vallejo	12	3	3	6	12	18	−6	12	Advance to Relegation play-offs
10	Biavo	12	3	3	6	18	32	−14	12	Advance to Relegation play-offs
11	UNSAAC	12	3	1	8	13	37	−24	10	Advance to Relegation play-offs
12	Ayacucho	12	1	0	11	7	45	−38	3	Advance to Relegation play-offs
13	Academia Cantolao	12	0	2	10	5	30	−25	2	Advance to Relegation play-offs

Source: FPF, ADFP
Rules for classification: 1) Points; 2) Goal difference; 3) Goals for; 4) Drawing of lots.

=== Results ===
The match schedule was decided based on the draw which was held on 2024.

Home \ Away	CAN	ALI	AYA	BIA	CAM	DEF	MUN	KIL	MEL	SCR	UCV	UNI	UNS
Academia Cantolao				2–2		0–1	0–1	1–2		0–3			0–2
Alianza Lima	6–0					4–0		9–1		2–1	4–0		14–0
Ayacucho	3–2	0–8			0–2				1–7		0–1	1–7	
Biavo		1–3	2–0		0–2				1–1		2–1	1–9	
Carlos A. Mannucci	3–0	0–3				6–1			2–1	0–1	3–1		
Defensores del Ilucán			3–0	4–1			1–1	3–0		0–1			3–0
Deportivo Municipal		0–4	1–0	2–1	0–3				0–1			1–6	
Killas			1–0	0–3	1–1		1–2					1–4	2–1
Melgar	4–0	1–2				0–0		2–0		1–0	1–0		
Sporting Cristal			8–0	6–2			2–1	1–0				1–2	2–1
Universidad César Vallejo	0–0					2–0	1–1	1–2		0–0			4–1
Universitario	3–0	0–0			2–0	4–0			2–0		4–1		
UNSAAC			3–2	2–2	1–0		0–1		0–1			2–6	

Source: FPF, ADFP
Legend: Blue = home team win; Yellow = draw; Red = away team win.

== Play-offs ==
=== Championship play-offs ===
In the championship play-offs, teams ranked 1st and 2nd in the regular stage started with 2 and 1 extra points respectively. Points earned during the regular stage did not carry over during the hexagonal.

==== Hexagonal table ====
Pos	Team	Pld	W	D	L	GF	GA	GD	Pts	Qualification	ALI	CAM	UNI	CRI	MEL	DEF
1	Alianza Lima	5	4	0	1	12	1	+11	14	Advance to semi-finals		1–0	0–1		4–0	
2	Carlos A. Mannucci	5	4	0	1	8	2	+6	12	Advance to semi-finals					1–0	4–1
3	Universitario	5	3	1	1	8	4	+4	11	Advance to semi-finals		0–2		0–0	4–1	
4	Sporting Cristal	5	1	2	2	2	6	−4	5	Advance to semi-finals	0–5	0–1				2–0
5	Melgar	5	1	1	3	7	9	−2	4					0–0		6–0
6	Defensores del Ilucán	5	0	0	5	2	17	−15	0		0–2		1–3			

Updated to match(es) played on 2024. Source: FPF
Legend: Blue = home team win; Yellow = draw; Red = away team win.

=== Bracket ===
The semi-final matchups were:

- SF1: Hexagonal 1st place vs. Hexagonal 4th place
- SF2: Hexagonal 2nd place vs. Hexagonal 3rd place

Semifinals
1	Alianza Lima	0	2	2
4	Sporting Cristal	0	1	1
3	Universitario	1	5	6
2	Carlos A. Mannucci	1	0	1

Finals
Alianza Lima	2	3	5
Universitario	0	1	1

==== Semi-finals ====
In the semi-finals, if a match was level at the end of normal 90 minutes playing time, extra time was not played and a penalty shoot-out was used to determine the winners.

===== First leg =====
10 August 2024
12:30

Sporting Cristal	0–0	Alianza Lima

Estadio Alberto Gallardo, Lima
Referee: José González
11 August 2024
10:45

Carlos A. Mannucci	1–1	Universitario
Maribel Portillo 36'		Yelitza Toledo 16' (o.g.)

Estadio Mansiche, Trujillo
Referee: Juber Barboza

===== Second leg =====
18 August 2024
10:30

Universitario	5–0	Carlos A. Mannucci
Stephanie Lacoste 20'; Milena Tomayconsa 23'; Lizeth Ocampo 57'; Sandra Arévalo 73'; Sabrina Ramírez 90+1'

Campo Mar U, Lima
Referee: Luis Seminario
18 August 2024
15:30

Alianza Lima	2–1	Sporting Cristal
Heydi Padilla 1'; Adriana Lúcar 90+8'		Alison Buitrón 40'

Estadio Alejandro Villanueva, Lima
Referee: Augusto Menendez

==== Finals ====
25 August 2024
17:45

Universitario	0–2	Alianza Lima
		Angie Castañeda 47'; Heidy Padilla 68'

Estadio Monumental "U", Lima
Referee: Bruno Pérez
30 August 2024
14:30

Alianza Lima	3–1	Universitario
Thaisa Assunção 21'; Alison Reyes 72'; Angie Castañeda 82'		Manuel González 68'

Estadio Alejandro Villanueva, Lima
Referee: Edwin Ordóñez

=== Relegation play-offs ===
In the relegation play-offs, teams ranked 11th, 12th and 13th in the regular stage started with 1 and 2 less points respectively. Points earned during the regular stage did not carry over during the play-offs.

Pos	Team	Pld	W	D	L	GF	GA	GD	Pts	Relegation	BIA	UCV	KIL	UNS	MUN	AYA	CAN
1	Biavo	6	5	1	0	14	4	+10	16					1–0		1–0	4–0
2	Universidad César Vallejo	6	3	3	0	11	8	+3	12		2–2			2–1		2–1	
3	Killas	6	3	1	2	9	8	+1	10		1–4	1–2		1–1			
4	UNSAAC	6	3	1	2	12	6	+6	9						4–1	2–1	4–0
5	Deportivo Municipal (R)	6	1	2	3	4	8	−4	5	Relegation to 2025 Liga de Ascenso Femenina	1–2	1–1	0–1				
6	Ayacucho (R)	6	1	1	4	8	8	0	3	Relegation to 2025 Liga de Ascenso Femenina			1–3		0–0		5–0
7	Academia Cantolao (R)	6	0	1	5	2	18	−16	−1	Relegation to 2025 Liga de Ascenso Femenina		2–2	0–2		0–1		

Updated to match(es) played on 2024. Source: FPF
Legend: Blue = home team win; Yellow = draw; Red = away team win.
(R) Relegated

== Top scorers ==
Rank	Name	Club	Goals
1	(Peru) Adriana Lúcar	Alianza Lima	20
2	(Peru) Raquel Bilcape	Melgar	15
3	(Colombia) Manuela González	Universitario	13
4	(Brazil) Thaisa Assunção	Alianza Lima	13
5	(Peru) Shanda Mamani	UNSAAC	12

== See also ==
- 2024 Liga de Ascenso Femenina
