= Liga de Ascenso Femenina (Perú) =

- Founded: 2018; 8 years ago
- Country: Peru
- Confederation: CONMEBOL
- Number of clubs: Variable
- Level on pyramid: 2
- Promotion to: Primera División Femenina
- Current champions: Deportivo Yanapuma (2025)
- Most championships: Biavo; Deportivo Yanapuma; Melgar; Real Áncash (1)
- Current: 2026 season

The Liga de Ascenso Femenina (formerly known as Campeonato Nacional de Fútbol Femenino and Copa Perú Femenina) is currently the second level league competition for women's football in Peru that officially started in 2009. Until 2019 it was the top tournament of Peruvian Primera División Femenina whose winner qualified for the Copa Libertadores de Fútbol Femenino, the South American Champions League. The competition is organised by the Peruvian Football Federation.

In 2020, the main tournament was renamed as Liga Femenina while the Campeonato Nacional de Fútbol Femenino served as the basis for structuring the second level league competition that was designated as Copa Perú Femenina.

== History ==
=== Metropolitan women's football championship ===
Like the men's tournament, the Peruvian Primera División Femenina began on a regional and amateur basis. On 1996 the Peruvian female football competitions started with the creation of the "Campeonato Metropolitano de Fútbol Femenino" (Metropolitan women's football championship) organized by the Peruvian Football Federation and played with sport clubs from Lima and Callao. The champion of the first edition was the team of Club Universitario. On 2000 the club Sporting Cristal became three-time champion by getting the titles of 1998, 1999 and 2000. Later, the team of Club Universitario equaled that record by getting the 2001, 2002 and 2003 titles.

=== Women's football national championship ===
On 2008 the Peruvian Football Federation modified the competition scheme in order to give it a national scope, setting the tournament in three fases: provincial, regional and national. With this new competition format, the tournament was renamed as "Campeonato Nacional de Fútbol Femenino" (women's football national championship), and incorporated the former tournament (Campeonato Metropolitano de Fútbol Femenino) as the Region IV (Lima & Callao) of its regional stage.

Regional stage	Departments
Region I	Amazonas, Lambayeque, Piura, Tumbes
Region II	Áncash, Cajamarca, La Libertad, San Martín
Region III	Loreto, Ucayali
Region IV	Lima, Callao
Region V	Huánuco, Junín, Pasco
Region VI	Ayacucho, Huancavelica, Ica
Region VII	Arequipa, Moquegua, Tacna
Region VIII	Apurímac, Cusco, Madre de Dios, Puno

Since 2009 the champion qualifies for the Copa Libertadores Femenina. the first champion under this new format was the team of White Star. That same year, the Peruvian Football Federation and the FIFA agreed to incorporate representatives of the Women's football Championship into the FPF Bases Assembly, thus granting them greater participation in the decisions of the governing body of Peruvian football On 2012 the team of JC Sport Girls became three-times champion, while on 2016 the team of Club Universitario de Deportes won the tri-championship for the second time. As of 2017, the Peruvian Football Federation decided to accommodate its calendar to that of Conmebol so that the local women's tournaments would not intersect with the development of the Copa Libertadores Femenina. Until that time, the tournament schedule had no relation to the annual calendar; that is, the national championship of one year was defined the following year.

=== Liga de Ascenso Femenina ===
The Copa Perú Femenina was renamed for 2023 as the Liga de Ascenso Femenina. This tournament will begin in Departmental Stage I and will end in National Stage III, in the month of November 2023. Another change to this competition is that it will only grant 2 places to the 2024 Liga Femenina.

== Format ==
In the current format, which was adopted in 2008, the champions of the 9 regional leagues meet each other over one week and play out a national champion. The nine teams are put into three groups of three. Each team then has two matches. The group winners and best runners-up meet in the semi-finals. Those as well as the final is contested over one leg only. In 2012 the final tournament consisted of eight regional champions and four teams from the capital. It is played around October of the year.

== List of champions ==
Below is the list of champions as the second division:

- (In bracket, title count):

Ed.	Season	Champion	Runner-up	Third	Winning manager
Copa Perú Femenina (2022)
1	2022	Melgar (1)	Defensores de Ilucán	Sporting Victoria	(Peru) Lucy Rodríguez
Liga de Ascenso Femenina (2023–present)
2	2023	Biavo (1)	UNSAAC	La Cantera	(Peru) Ruber Guerrero
3	2024	Real Áncash (1)	Flamengo	Deportivo Yanapuma	(Peru) Celestino Huaranga
4	2025	Deportivo Yanapuma (1)	Atlético Andahuaylas	Trujillanos	(Peru) Julius Rengifo
5	2026				

== Titles by club ==
Rank	Club	Titles	Runners-up	Seasons won	Seasons runner-up
1	Biavo	1	—	2023	—
1	Deportivo Yanapuma	1	—	2025	—
1	Melgar	1	—	2022	—
1	Real Áncash	1	—	2024	—

== Titles by region ==
Region	Nº of titles	Clubs
(Ancash) Áncash	1	Real Áncash (1)
Arequipa	1	Melgar (1)
(Loreto Region) Loreto	1	Deportivo Yanapuma (1)
(San Martín Region) San Martín	1	Biavo (1)

== List of Regional champions ==
Season		Champion	Runner-up
Copa Perú Femenina (2018–2019)
2018	Región I	Juventus Ferreñafe	
2018	Región II	FC Barza	Defensores del Ilucán
2018	Región III	Amazon Sky	
2018	Región IV	JC Sport Girls	La Cantera
2018	Región V	Nueva Sociedad	Academia Aucayacu
2018	Región VI	Ayacucho	Soccer Ica
2018	Región VII	Municipalidad de Majes	Sporting Unión Arequipa
2018	Región VIII	Real Unchiña	
2019	Región I	Juventus Ferreñafe	UNP
2019	Región II	Juventud Talentos	Queens United
2019	Región III	Amazon Sky	Soria & Wong
2019	Región IV	Universitario	Alianza Lima
2019	Región V	Flamengo	Botica 24 Horas
2019	Región VI	Real Victoria	Soccer Ica
2019	Región VII	Stella Maris	Defensor UNTAC
2019	Región VIII	Angelu Lucrecia	Social Melgar
Liga de Ascenso Femenina (2022)
2022	Región I	Real Chachapoyas	Alianza Atlético
2022	Región II	Defensores del Ilucán	Universitario de Trujillo
2022	Región III	Sporting Victoria	Nuevo Pucallpa
2022	Región IV	Colmillo Comas	Aviar Soccer
2022	Región V	Ramiro Villaverde	2 de Enero (Acomayo)
2022	Región VI	Diosdado Franco Luján	Player Villafuerte
2022	Región VII	Melgar	Virgen de la Natividad
2022	Región VIII	Atlético Andahuaylas	San Francisco de Asís (Chincheros)
Defunct tournament

== List of Departmental Champions ==
=== Liga Departamental de Amazonas ===
Ed.	Season	Champion	Runner-up
1	2022	Real Chachapoyas	FC Utcubamba
2	2023	Real Chachapoyas	
3	2024	Real Chachapoyas	FC Utcubamba
4	2025	Real Chachapoyas	Unión Vencedores
–	2026	No tournament	

=== Liga Departamental de Áncash ===
Ed.	Season	Champion	Runner-up
1	2022	Real Áncash	Santa Melania
2	2023	AD River Plate	Deportivo Pachapaqui
3	2024	Real Áncash	Santa Melania
4	2025	AD River Plate	UNASAM
5	2026	Santa Melania	Las Magnolias

=== Liga Departamental de Apurímac ===
Ed.	Season	Champion	Runner-up
1	2022	Atlético Andahuaylas	Bustap FC
2	2023	Unión Panamericana	Deportivo Listana
3	2024	Atlético Andahuaylas	Sport Killa´s
4	2025	Atlético Andahuaylas	Sport Killa´s
5	2026	Sport Killa´s	FC Tambulla

=== Liga Departamental de Arequipa ===
Ed.	Season	Champion	Runner-up
1	2022	Melgar	Stella Maris
2	2023	Melgar Junior	Puerto Matarani
3	2024	Stella Maris	Blue Star Arequipa
4	2025	FD Galaxy	Team Zamácola
5	2026	Stella Maris	Arequipa Sin Límites

=== Liga Departamental de Ayacucho ===
Ed.	Season	Champion	Runner-up
1	2022	Player Villafuerte	Strong Scalu
2	2023	Strong Scalu	Aguerridas Morochucos
3	2024	Strong Scalu	Deportivo Huáscar
4	2025	Deportivo Huáscar	Bella Esmeralda
5	2026	Deportivo Huáscar	Strong Scalu

=== Liga Departamental de Cajamarca ===
Ed.	Season	Champion	Runner-up
1	2022	Defensores del Ilucán	Queens United
–	2023	No tournament	
2	2024	Real Millennium	Estrella Roja
3	2025	Deportivo Rayma	Real Millennium
4	2026	EF Chasqui	Deportivo Magdalena LR

=== Liga Departamental del Callao ===
Ed.	Season	Champion	Runner-up
1	2022	Juventud Callao Girls	Aviar Soccer
–	2023	No tournament	
2	2024	Sport Boys	Escuela Municipal Ventanilla
3	2025	Sport Boys	Academia Cantolao
4	2026	Academia Cantolao	Escuela Municipal Ventanilla

=== Liga Departamental del Cusco ===
Ed.	Season	Champion	Runner-up
1	2022	San Francisco de Asís	Cienciano
2	2023	UNSAAC	Social Melgar
3	2024	Real Unión Coporaque	San Francisco de Asís
4	2025	Deportivo Garcilaso	Cienciano
5	2026	Deportivo Garcilaso	Unión Social Pallpata

=== Liga Departamental de Huánuco ===
Ed.	Season	Champion	Runner-up
1	2022	Botica 24 Horas	2 de Enero (Acomayo)
2	2023	Academia Aucayacu	Deportivo Municipal (Huarichaca)
3	2024	Botica 24 Horas	León de Huánuco
4	2025	Pillko City	Sporting Grafima
5	2026	Deportivo Torres FC	Sporting Grafima

=== Liga Departamental de Ica ===
Ed.	Season	Champion	Runner-up
1	2022	Diosdado Franco Luján	Soccer Ica
2	2023	Soccer Ica	Claucato
3	2024	Diosdado Franco Luján	Defensor Lima
4	2025	Soccer Ica	Nacional de San Joaquín
5	2026	Defensor Lima	ADF M&M

=== Liga Departamental de Junín ===
Ed.	Season	Champion	Runner-up
1	2022	Flamengo	Ramiro Villaverde
2	2023	Ramiro Villaverde	INTEC
3	2024	Flamengo	Ramiro Villaverde
4	2025	Deportivo Fénix	ADT
5	2026	Tigres Santa Rosa	ADT

=== Liga Departamental de La Libertad ===
Ed.	Season	Champion	Runner-up
1	2022	Universitario de Trujillo	Gloriosa Cantuta
2	2023	Gloriosa Cantuta	Carlos Tenaud
3	2024	Atlético Trujillo	Gloriosa Cantuta
4	2025	Trujillanos	Carlos Tenaud
5	2026	Trujillanos	Gloriosa Cantuta

=== Liga Departamental de Lambayeque ===
Ed.	Season	Champion	Runner-up
1	2022	Fuerza Leonardina	Real Ferreñafe
2	2023	Doradas FC	Real Ferreñafe
3	2024	Real Ferreñafe	Real Chiclayo
4	2025	Zafra FC	Quimeras FC
5	2026	Zafra FC	Deportivo Yeyluz

=== Liga Departamental de Lima ===
Ed.	Season	Champion	Runner-up
1	2022	Colmillo Comas	Cultural Lima
2	2023	La Cantera	Cultural Lima
3	2024	Colmillo Comas	Valencia Deport
4	2025	Colmillo Comas	Deportivo Partizán
5	2026	Colmillo Comas	Deportivo Partizán

=== Liga Departamental de Loreto ===
Ed.	Season	Champion	Runner-up
1	2022	Sporting Victoria	Real Lobas
2	2023	Real Yurimaguas	
3	2024	Deportivo Yanapuma	Loretanas de Oro
4	2025	Deportivo Yanapuma	Loretanas de Oro
5	2026	Real Amazonas	

=== Liga Departamental de Moquegua ===
Ed.	Season	Champion	Runner-up
1	2022	Bolívar Academia UJCM	
2	2023	Bolívar Academia UJCM	
3	2024	Bolívar Academia UJCM	AD Simón Bolívar
4	2025	Bolívar Academia UJCM	Estrellas del Balón
5	2026	AD Simón Bolívar	Bolívar Academia UJCM

=== Liga Departamental de Pasco ===
Ed.	Season	Champion	Runner-up
1	2022	Deportivo Municipal (Villa Rica)	Peñarol Huarautambo
–	2023	No tournament	
2	2024	Deportivo Municipal (Villa Rica)	
–	2025	No tournament	
4	2026	Deportivo Villa Rica	

=== Liga Departamental de Piura ===
Ed.	Season	Champion	Runner-up
1	2022	Alianza Atlético	UNP
2	2023	Real Piura	AD Manglares de Vice
3	2024	Sporting Piura	AD Manglares de Vice
4	2025	Sporting Piura	AD Manglares de Vice
5	2026	Sporting Piura	AD Manglares de Vice

=== Liga Departamental de Puno ===
Ed.	Season	Champion	Runner-up
1	2022	FST Barza San Román	Deportivo Universitario
2	2023	FST Barza San Román	Antenor Escudero
3	2024	Leonas Doradas	Retto Hungaritos
4	2025	FST Barza San Román	Deportivo Universitario
5	2026	Deportivo Altinos	FST Barza San Román

=== Liga Departamental de San Martín ===
Ed.	Season	Champion	Runner-up
1	2022	Real Juanjuí	—
2	2023	Biavo	Atlético Dorado
3	2024	Chacal FC	Deportivo Evenecer
4	2025	Tomodachi	Alianza Santa Rosa
5	2026	Tomodachi	Alianza Rioja

=== Liga Departamental de Tacna ===
Ed.	Season	Champion	Runner-up
1	2022	Virgen de la Natividad	Bentín Saetas
2	2023	Coronel Bolognesi	Team Takana
3	2024	Team Takana	Saetas Tacna
4	2025	Glorioso Zepita	Bentín Tacna Heroica
5	2026	Bentín Tacna Heroica	Glorioso Zepita

=== Liga Departamental de Tumbes ===
Ed.	Season	Champion	Runner-up
1	2022	UNT	AD Nacional Zarumilla
2	2023	ET El Triunfo	Superliga Zarumilla
3	2024	Superliga Zarumilla	Sport Pampas
4	2025	ET El Triunfo	Superliga Zarumilla
5	2026	Superliga Zarumilla	

=== Liga Departamental de Ucayali ===
Ed.	Season	Champion	Runner-up
1	2022	Nuevo Pucallpa	Real Manco Cápac
2	2023	Nuevo Pucallpa	Racing Manantay
3	2024	Force Cruzeiro	Nuevo Pucallpa
4	2025	Shipibo FC	Force Cruzeiro
5	2026	Shipibo FC	Vasquez FC
