= 2026 Liga de Ascenso Femenina (Peru) =

Liga de Ascenso Femenina
- Season: 2026
- Dates: 17 October – 28 November 2026

The 2026 Liga de Ascenso Femenina season is an amateur women's football championship, developed, organized, and promoted by the Peruvian Football Federation (FPF), which granted two direct promotion spots to the 2027 Liga Femenina FPF. This will be the 4th edition of the Liga de Ascenso Femenina and for the fifth time it had a second-division character, granting direct promotion to the Liga Femenina.

== Fase I Departamental Stage ==
Department	Team	Location
Amazonas	—	—
Ancash	Santa Melania	Casma
Apurímac	Sport Killa's	Abancay
Arequipa	Stella Maris	Arequipa
Ayacucho	Deportivo Huáscar	Ayacucho
Cajamarca	EF Chasqui	Cajamarca
Callao	Academia Cantolao	Callao
Cusco	Deportivo Garcilaso	Cusco
Huancavelica	—	—
Huánuco	Deportivo Torres FC	Ambo
Ica	Defensor Lima Las Dunas	Pisco
Junín	Tigres Santa Rosa	Huancan

Department	Team	Location
La Libertad	Trujillanos	Trujillo
Lambayeque	Zafra FC	Chiclayo
Lima	Colmillo Comas	Comas
Loreto	Real Amazonas	Yurimaguas
Madre de Dios	—	—
Moquegua	AD Simón Bolívar	Moquegua
Pasco	Deportivo Villa Rica	Villa Rica
Piura	Sporting Piura	Piura
Puno	Deportivo Altinos	Azángaro
San Martín	Tomodachi	Tarapoto
Tacna	Bentín Tacna Heroica	Tacna
Tumbes	Superliga Zarumilla	Zarumilla
Ucayali	Shipibo FC	Pucallpa

== Fase II Inter Regional ==
=== First Stage ===
The round was played on 17 and 18 October, in a single knock-out match format.

Team 1	Score	Team 2
EF Chasqui	1–2	Superliga Zarumilla
Zafra FC	3–1	Defensor Lima
Sporting Piura	0–3	Santa Melania
Trujillanos	10–1	Academia Cantolao
Tomodachi	3–1	Shipibo FC
Real Amazonas	0–3	Deportivo Torres
Colmillo Comas	4–0	Deportivo Huáscar
Stella Maris	0–0 (4–2 p)	Deportivo Garcilaso
Sport Killa's	0–3	Tigres Santa Rosa
Bentín Tacna Heroica	2–0	AD Simón Bolívar
Deportivo Villa Rica	1–5	Deportivo Altinos

=== Second Stage ===
The round was played on 31 October and 1 November, in a single knock-out match format.

Team 1	Score	Team 2
Superliga Zarumilla	0–2	Zafra FC
Santa Melanina	1–1 (0–2 p)	Trujillanos
Tomodachi	0–2	Deportivo Torres
Colmillo Comas	1–0	Stella Maris
Tigres Santa Rosa	4–1	Bentín Tacna Heroica
Deportivo Altinos	0–8	Deportivo Garcilaso

=== Third Stage ===
The round was played on 15 November, in a single knock-out match format.

Team 1	Score	Team 2
Trujillanos	1–0	Zafra FC
Colmillo Comas	3–1	Deportivo Torres
Tigres Santa Rosa	2–1	Deportivo Garcilaso

== Fase III Final Nacional ==
=== Standings ===
Pos	Team	Pld	W	D	L	GF	GA	GD	Pts	Qualification or relegation	COL	GAR	TIG	TRU
1	Colmillo Comas	0	0	0	0	0	0	0	0	Advance to 2027 Liga Femenina FPF				
2	Deportivo Garcilaso	0	0	0	0	0	0	0	0	Advance to 2027 Liga Femenina FPF				
3	Tigres Santa Rosa	0	0	0	0	0	0	0	0					
4	Trujillanos	0	0	0	0	0	0	0	0					

Updated to match(es) played on unknown. Source:
Legend: Blue = home team win; Yellow = draw; Red = away team win.
Rules for classification: 1) Points; 2) Goal difference; 3) Goals for; 4) Fair play points; 5) Drawing of lots.

=== Results ===
==== Round 1 ====
30 November 2026	Trujillanos	–	Deportivo Garcilaso	Estadio Municipal Solís García, Chosica
10:00

30 November 2026	Colmillo Comas	–	Tigres Santa Rosa	Estadio Municipal Solís García, Chosica
10:00

==== Round 2 ====
1 December 2026	Trujillanos	–	Colmillo Comas	Estadio Municipal Solís García, Chosica
10:00

1 December 2026	Tigres Santa Rosa	–	Deportivo Garcilaso	Estadio Municipal Solís García, Chosica
14:00

==== Round 3 ====
3 December 2026	Trujillanos	–	Tigres Santa Rosa	Estadio Municipal Solís García, Chosica
11:00

3 December 2026	Deportivo Garcilaso	–	Colmillo Comas	Estadio Municipal Solís García, Chosica
15:00

== See also ==
- 2026 Liga Femenina FPF
