= 2023 Liga de Ascenso Femenina (Perú) =

Liga de Ascenso Femenina
- Season: 2023
- Champions: Biavo
- Promoted: Biavo; UNSAAC

The 2023 Liga de Ascenso Femenina season was an amateur women's football championship, developed, organized, and promoted by the Peruvian Football Federation (FPF), which granted two direct promotion spots to the 2024 Liga Femenina. This was the 4th edition of the Women's Copa Perú and for the second time it had a second-division format, granting direct promotion to the Liga Femenina.

The Copa Perú Femenina was renamed for 2023 as the Liga de Ascenso Femenina. This tournament will begin in Departmental Stage I and will end in National Stage III, in the month of November 2023. Another change to this competition is that it will only grant 2 spots to the 2024 Liga Femenina.

== Fase I Departamental Stage ==
Department	Team	Location
Amazonas	Real Chachapoyas	Chachapoyas
Ancash	River Plate	Casma
Apurímac	Unión Panamericana	Chalhuanca
Arequipa	Melgar Junior	Arequipa
Ayacucho	Strong Scalú	Vinchos
Cajamarca	—	—
Callao	—	—
Cusco	UNSAAC	Cusco
Huánuco	ACD Aucayacu	Aucayacu
Huancavelica	—	—
Ica	Soccer Ica	Ica
Junín	Ramiro Villaverde Lazo	Huancayo

Department	Team	Location
La Libertad	Gloriosa Cantuta	Huamachuco
Lambayeque	Doradas	Chiclayo
Lima	La Cantera	Lima
Loreto	Real Yurimaguas	Yurimaguas
Madre de Dios	—	—
Moquegua	Bolívar Academia UJCM	Moquegua
Pasco	—	—
Piura	Real Piura	Piura
Puno	FST Barza San Román	Juliaca
San Martín	Biavo	Bellavista
Tacna	Coronel Bolognesi	Tacna
Tumbes	Escuela de Talentos El Triunfo	Tumbes
Ucayali	Nuevo Pucallpa	Ucayali

== Fase II Inter Regional ==
=== First Stage ===
The round was played on 14 and 15 October, in a single knock-out match format.

Team 1	Score	Team 2
Escuela de Talentos El Triunfo	0–2	Doradas
Real Chachapoyas	1–2	Biavo
Gloriosa Cantuta	3–0	Real Piura
Real Yurimaguas	1–1 (2–4 p)	Soccer Ica
Nuevo Pucallpa	0–3	Ramiro Villaverde Lazo
ACD Aucayacu	5–2	River Plate
La Cantera	3–0	Strong Scalú
Coronel Bolognesi	5–3	Bolívar Academia UJCM
Melgar Junior	0–3	UNSAAC
FST Barza San Román	1–1 (4–5 p)	Unión Panamericana

=== Second Stage ===
The round was played on 21 and 22 October, in a single knock-out match format.

Team 1	Score	Team 2
Doradas	1–2	Biavo
Gloriosa Cantuta	0–0 (3–4 p)	Soccer Ica
Ramiro Villaverde Lazo	1–3	ACD Aucayacu
La Cantera	2–0	Coronel Bolognesi
UNSAAC	5–3	Unión Panamericana

=== Third Stage ===
The round was played on 4 and 5 November, in a single knock-out match format.

Team 1	Score	Team 2
UNSAAC	2–1	ACD Aucayacu
La Cantera	3–2	Soccer Ica
Biavo	0–0 (3–4 p)	Gloriosa Cantuta

== Fase III Final Nacional ==
=== Bracket ===
Semifinals
Biavo	1 (4)
La Cantera	1 (3)
UNSAAC	5
Gloriosa Cantuta	1

Finals
Biavo	2 (4)
UNSAAC	2 (2)

=== Semifinals ===
23 November 2023	Gloriosa Cantuta	1–5	UNSAAC	Estadio Segundo Aranda Torres, Huacho
11:00

23 November 2023	La Cantera	1–1 (3–4 p)	Biavo	Estadio Segundo Aranda Torres, Huacho
15:00

=== Third place ===
24 November 2023	Gloriosa Cantuta	1–1 (1–3 p)	La Cantera	Estadio Segundo Aranda Torres, Huacho
11:00

=== Final ===
25 November 2023	UNSAAC	2–2 (2–4 p)	Biavo	Estadio Segundo Aranda Torres, Huacho
11:00

== See also ==
- 2023 Liga Femenina
