= Yautan District =

Coordinates: 9°31′01″S 78°00′00″W

Yautan
- District
- Interactive map of Yautan
- Country: Peru
- Region: Ancash
- Province: Casma
- Founded: October 21, 1870
- Capital: Yautan

Government
  - Mayor: José Luis Del Carpio Melgarejo

Area
  - Total: 357.2 km^{2} (137.9 sq mi)
- Elevation: 809 m (2,654 ft)

Population (2005 census)
  - Total: 7,138
  - Density: 19.98/km^{2} (51.76/sq mi)
- Time zone: UTC-5 (PET)
- UBIGEO: 020804

Yautan District is one of four districts of the province Casma in Peru.
