= Club Alianza Lima (women) =

Football club in Peru

Alianza Lima
- Full name: Club Alianza Lima Femenino
- Nicknames: Los Blanquiazules; El Equipo del Pueblo; Los Íntimas
- Founded: 1997; 29 years ago
- Ground: Estadio Alejandro Villanueva
- Capacity: 33,938
- Chairman: Sisy Quiroz
- Manager: José Letelier
- League: Liga Femenina
- 2025: Liga Femenina, 1st of 12
- Website: clubalianzalima.com.pe

Club Alianza Lima Femenino, more commonly known as Alianza Lima, is a Peruvian professional women's football club based in Lima, Peru. The club was founded in 1997 participates in the Primera División Femenina. It is the women's football section of sports club Alianza Lima.

== History ==
The club was founded in 1997 as a result of the growth in women's football and to provide the same opportunities as mens football. Alianza Lima participated in the amateur league, Campeonato Metropolitano until 2007.

In 2021, Alianza Lima was invited to participate in the Primera División Femenina after previously playing in the Copa Perú Femenina. That same year, Alianza Lima won the national title for the first time, qualifying for the 2021 Copa Libertadores Femenina. After placing second in their group, Alianza Lima advanced to the quarter-finals before being eliminated by Corinthians. The club won the national title again in 2022 and 2024.

In 2025, Alianza Lima defeated Universitario in the finals by an aggregate score of 5–3 to win their fourth tournament title.

== Noche Blanquiazul ==
The Noche Blanquiazul is the name given to the annual presentation of the professional squad of Club Alianza Lima, one of Peru's Big Three.

Starting with a musical performance (usually criolla or salsa music), Noche Blanquiazul marks the introduction of the club's new players, followed by a friendly match against an international guest team. The event was first held in 2023.

== Managers ==
=== Winning Managers ===
Manager	Years	Titles
(Peru) Samir Mendonza	2013–2022	2021, 2022
(Chile) José Letelier	2024–2026	2024, 2025 Apertura, 2025

=== Other managers ===
- (Peru) Javier Castillo (1997)
- (Peru) Julio Ramírez (1997)
- (Colombia) Jhon Alber Ortíz (2023)

== Honours ==
=== Senior titles ===
Keys

- Record
- ^{(s)} Shared record

Type	Competition	Titles	Runner-up	Winning years	Runner-up years
National (League)	Liga Femenina	4	2	2021, 2022, 2024, 2025	2023, 2026
Half-year / Short; Tournament (League)	Torneo Apertura	1	—	2025	—
Half-year / Short; Tournament (League)	Torneo Clausura	—	2	—	2025, 2026
Regional (League)	Región IV	—	1	—	2019
Regional (League)	Zona Lima	—	2	—	2015, 2019

=== Youth team ===
Type	Competition	Titles	Runner-up	Winning years	Runner-up years
National (League)	Torneo Juvenil Femenino FPF Sub-18	1	—	2022	—
National (League)	Torneo Juvenil Femenino FPF Sub-16	2	—	2024, 2025	—
National (League)	Torneo Juvenil Femenino FPF Sub-14	2	—	2022, 2023	—
Regional (League)	Torneo Extraordinario Femenino Sub-20	—	1	—	2025

== Performance in CONMEBOL competitions ==
- Copa Libertadores Femenina: 4 appearances

2021: Quarter-finals (7th place)
2022: Group stage
2024: Quarter-finals (7th place)
2025: Group stage

== Record players ==
=== Top scorers ===
As of 13 December 2025

Rank	Name	Liga Femenina						Copa Libertadores						Total
Rank	Name	2021	2022	2023	2024	2025	Total	2021	2022	2024	2025	2026	Total	Total
1	(Peru) Adriana Lúcar	23	17	17	20	21	98	1	—	3	—	—	4	102
2	(Peru) Gladys Dorador	7	7	10	7	6	37	2	—	—	—	—	2	39
3	(Venezuela) Neidy Romero	15	12	3	1	3	34	—	—	1	—	—	1	35
4	(Venezuela) Heidy Padilla	5	7	7	5	9	33	—	1	—	—	—	1	34
5	(Peru) Yomira Tacilla	2	3	11	1	10	27	—	—	—	—	—	—	27

== See also ==
- Club Alianza Lima
- Primera División Femenina
