= 2015 Campeonato Nacional de Fútbol Femenino (Perú) =

Campeonato Nacional de Fútbol Femenino
- Season: 2015
- Champions: Universitario
- Copa Libertadores: Universitario

The 2015 Campeonato Nacional de Fútbol Femenino season, was an amateur women's football championship, developed, organized, and promoted by the Peruvian Football Federation (FPF), which granted the classification to the 2016 Copa Libertadores Femenina.

Universitario won their seventh title after defeating CGTP by a 8–0 score in the finals. As champions, Universitario qualified for the 2016 Copa Libertadores Femenina.

== Regional Stage ==
| Department | Team |
|---|---|
| Ancash | Cambios Lázaro |
| Apurímac | Retamozo |
| Arequipa | Internacional |
| Ayacucho | Unión Mercedes |
| Huánuco | Colegio Nacional Inca Huiracocha |
| Lima | Universitario |
| Loreto | CGTP |
| Piura | UNP |
| San Martín | Sport Willy |
| Ucayali | Deportivo Vásquez |

== Zona Lima ==
=== Liguilla de Oro ===
==== Standings ====
| Pos | Team | Pld | W | D | L | GF | GA | GD | Pts | Qualification or relegation | UNI | ALI | CRI | JCS | SBA | CAN |
|---|---|---|---|---|---|---|---|---|---|---|---|---|---|---|---|---|
| 1 | Universitario | 10 | 9 | 0 | 1 | 25 | 5 | +20 | 27 | Advance to National stage | | — | 2–0 | — | — | — |
| 2 | Alianza Lima | 10 | 8 | 0 | 2 | 24 | 8 | +16 | 26 (Note: Alianza Lima obtained 2 bonus points) | | — | | 1–1 | 3–1 | — | — |
| 3 | Sporting Cristal | 10 | 7 | 0 | 3 | 26 | 11 | +15 | 22 (Note: Sporting Cristal obtained 1 bonus point.) | | — | 2–1 | | — | — | — |
| 4 | JC Sport Girls | 10 | 2 | 2 | 6 | 15 | 28 | −13 | 8 | | — | 2–4 | — | | — | — |
| 5 | Sport Boys | 9 | 1 | 1 | 7 | 12 | 21 | −9 | 4 | | — | — | — | — | | — |
| 6 | La Cantera | 9 | 0 | 1 | 8 | 8 | 29 | −21 | 1 | | — | — | — | — | — | |

Rules for classification: 1) Points; 2) Goal difference; 3) Goals for; 4) Fair play points; 5) Drawing of lots.

== National stage ==
=== Grupo A ===
| Pos | Team | Pld | W | D | L | GF | GA | GD | Pts | Qualification or relegation | UNI | INT | RET | CNI |
|---|---|---|---|---|---|---|---|---|---|---|---|---|---|---|
| 1 | Universitario | 3 | 3 | 0 | 0 | 24 | 0 | +24 | 9 | Advance to Final | | | 10–0 | 12–0 |
| 2 | Internacional | 3 | 1 | 1 | 1 | 6 | 2 | +4 | 4 | | 0–2 | | | |
| 3 | Retamozo | 2 | 0 | 0 | 2 | 0 | 16 | −16 | 0 | | | 0–6 | | |
| 4 | Colegio Nacional Inca Huiracocha | 2 | 0 | 1 | 1 | 0 | 12 | −12 | 1 | | | 0–0 | — | |

Rules for classification: 1) Points; 2) Goal difference; 3) Goals for; 4) Fair play points; 5) Drawing of lots.

=== Grupo B ===
| Pos | Team | Pld | W | D | L | GF | GA | GD | Pts | Qualification or relegation | CGT | LAZ | MER | UNP |
|---|---|---|---|---|---|---|---|---|---|---|---|---|---|---|
| 1 | CGTP | 3 | 3 | 0 | 0 | 15 | 1 | +14 | 9 | Advance to Final | | | | 8–1 |
| 2 | Cambios Lázaro | 1 | 0 | 0 | 1 | 0 | 2 | −2 | 0 | | 0–2 | | — | |
| 3 | Unión Mercedes | 1 | 0 | 0 | 1 | 0 | 5 | −5 | 0 | | 0–5 | | | |
| 4 | UNP | 1 | 0 | 0 | 1 | 1 | 8 | −7 | 0 | | | — | — | |

Rules for classification: 1) Points; 2) Goal difference; 3) Goals for; 4) Fair play points; 5) Drawing of lots.

== Final ==
| 22 April 2016 | Universitario | 8–0 | CGTP | VIDENA, Chincha |
| 09:00 |
