= Comandante Noel District =

Coordinates: 9°28′01″S 78°24′00″W

Comandante Noel
- District
- Interactive map of Comandante Noel
- Country: Peru
- Region: Ancash
- Province: Casma
- Founded: May 3, 1926
- Capital: Puerto Casma

Government
  - Mayor: José Alejandro Montalvan Macedo

Area
  - Total: 222.76 km^{2} (86.01 sq mi)
- Elevation: 12 m (39 ft)

Population (2005 census)
  - Total: 2,043
  - Density: 9.171/km^{2} (23.75/sq mi)
- Time zone: UTC-5 (PET)
- UBIGEO: 020803

Comandante Noel District is one of four districts of the province of Casma in Peru.
