= 2016 Campeonato Nacional de Fútbol Femenino (Perú) =

Campeonato Nacional de Fútbol Femenino
- Season: 2016
- Champions: Universitario
- Copa Libertadores: Universitario
- Top goalscorer: Pierina Núñez

The 2016 Campeonato Nacional de Fútbol Femenino season, was an amateur women's football championship, developed, organized, and promoted by the Peruvian Football Federation (FPF), which granted the classification to the 2017 Copa Libertadores Femenina.

Universitario won their eighth title after defeating Ramiro Villafuerte by a 5–1 score in the finals. As champions, Universitario qualified for the 2017 Copa Libertadores Femenina.

== Regional Stage ==
Department	Team
Apurímac	Angelu Lucrecia
Arequipa	Municipalidad de Majes
Huancavelica	UDA
Junín	Ramiro Villaverde
La Libertad	Juventud Talentos
Lima	Universitario
Loreto	
Piura	UNP

== National Stage ==
=== Grupo A ===
Pos	Team	Pld	W	D	L	GF	GA	GD	Pts	Qualification or relegation	RAM	ANG	UDA	LOR
1	Ramiro Villaverde	2	2	0	0	4	1	+3	6	Advance to Final		2–1	2–0	
2	Angelu Lucrecia	2	1	0	1	4	3	+1	3					3–1
3	UDA	2	1	0	1	3	3	0	3			—		
4	Loreto	2	0	0	2	2	6	−4	0		—		1–3	

Rules for classification: 1) Points; 2) Goal difference; 3) Goals for; 4) Fair play points; 5) Drawing of lots.

=== Grupo B ===
Pos	Team	Pld	W	D	L	GF	GA	GD	Pts	Qualification or relegation	UNI	MAJ	TAL	UDP
1	Universitario	3	3	0	0	20	2	+18	9	Advance to Final			5–1	11–0
2	Municipalidad de Majes	3	2	0	1	9	4	+5	6		1–4			
3	Juventud Talentos	2	0	0	2	1	9	−8	0			0–4		—
4	UNP	2	0	0	2	0	15	−15	0			0–4		

Rules for classification: 1) Points; 2) Goal difference; 3) Goals for; 4) Fair play points; 5) Drawing of lots.

== Final ==
27 January 2017	Universitario	5–1	Ramiro Villafuerte	VIDENA, Chincha
	Emily Flores; Alondra Vilchez; Even Pizango; Pierina Chávez
