= 2024 Liga de Ascenso Femenina (Perú) =

Liga de Ascenso Femenina
- Season: 2024
- Dates: 26 October – 12 December 2024
- Champions: Real Áncash (1st title)
- Matches: 24

The 2024 Liga de Ascenso Femenina season was an amateur women's football championship, developed, organized, and promoted by the Peruvian Football Federation (FPF), which granted two direct promotion spots to the 2025 Liga Femenina. This was the 5th edition of the Women's Copa Perú and for the third time it had a second-division format, granting direct promotion to the Liga Femenina.

== Fase I Departamental Stage ==
Department	Team	Location
Amazonas	Real Chachapoyas	Chachapoyas
Ancash	Real Áncash	Huaraz
Apurímac	Atlético Andahuaylas	Andahuaylas
Arequipa	Stella Maris	Arequipa
Ayacucho	Strong Scalú	Vinchos
Cajamarca	Real DC Millennium	Cajamarca
Callao	Sport Boys	Callao
Cusco	Real Unión Coporaque	Espinar
Huánuco	Botica 24 Horas	Ambo
Huancavelica	—	—
Ica	Diosdado Franco Luján	Ica
Junín	Flamengo	El Tambo

Department	Team	Location
La Libertad	Atlético Trujillo	Trujillo
Lambayeque	Real Ferreñafe	Ferreñafe
Lima	Colmillo Comas	Comas
Loreto	Deportivo Yanapuma	Iquitos
Madre de Dios	—	—
Moquegua	Bolívar Academia UJCM	Moquegua
Pasco	Deportivo Municipal (Villa Rica)	Villa Rica
Piura	Sporting Piura	Piura
Puno	Leonas Doradas	Puno
San Martín	Chacal FC	Moyobamba
Tacna	Team Takana	Tacna
Tumbes	Superliga Zarumilla	Zarumilla
Ucayali	Force Cruzeiro	Pucallpa

== Fase II Inter Regional ==
=== First Stage ===
The round was played on 26 and 27 October, in a single knock-out match format.

Team 1	Score	Team 2
Superliga Zarumilla	2–2 (3–4 p)	Real DC Millennium
Real Ferreñafe	0–2	Real Chachapoyas
Sporting Piura	0–2	Real Áncash
Atlético Trujillo	3–0	Sport Boys
Force Cruzeiro	1–5	Chacal FC
Flamengo	1–1 (4–2 p)	Botica 24 Horas
Diosdado Franco Luján	7–0	Deportivo Municipal (Villa Rica)
Colmillo Comas	0–3	Strong Scalú
Stella Maris	2–0	Real Unión Coporaque
Leonas Doradas	0–3	Atlético Andahuaylas
Team Takana	3–2	Bolívar Academia UJCM

=== Second Stage ===
The round was played on 9 and 10 November, in a single knock-out match format.

Team 1	Score	Team 2
Real DC Millennium	3–2	Real Chachapoyas
Atlético Trujillo	0–5	Real Áncash
Chacal FC	0–2	Flamengo
Diosdado Franco Luján	0–3	Deportivo Yanapuma
Strong Scalú	3–2	Stella Maris
Atlético Andahuaylas	0–0 (3-4 p)	Team Takana

=== Third Stage ===
The round was played on 23 and 24 November, in a single knock-out match format.

Team 1	Score	Team 2
Real DC Millennium	2–3	Real Áncash
Flamengo	0–0 (5-4 p)	Deportivo Yanapuma
Strong Scalú	3–0	Team Takana

== Fase III Final Nacional ==
=== Bracket ===
Semifinals
Real Áncash	2
Deportivo Yanapuma	0
Flamengo	1 (4)
Strong Scalú	1 (3)

Finals
Real Áncash	1 (3)
Flamengo	1 (2)

=== Semifinals ===
10 December 2024	Real Áncash	2–0	Deportivo Yanapuma	Municipal Cajonahuaylla, Cusco
10:00

10 December 2024	Flamengo	1–1 (4–3 p)	Strong Scalú	Municipal Cajonahuaylla, Cusco
14:00

=== Third Place ===
11 December 2024	Deportivo Yanapuma	2–0	Strong Scalú	Municipal Cajonahuaylla, Cusco
10:00

=== Final ===
12 December 2024	Real Áncash	1–1 (3–2 p)	Flamengo	Municipal Cajonahuaylla, Cusco
10:00

== See also ==
- 2024 Liga Femenina
