= 2019 Copa Perú Femenina =

Copa Perú Femenina
- Season: 2019
- Champions: Universitario
- Runner up: Amazon Sky
- Copa Libertadores: Universitario

The 2019 Copa Perú Femenina season (Spanish: Copa Perú Femenina 2019), was an amateur women's football championship, developed, organized, and promoted by the Peruvian Football Federation (FPF), which granted the classification to the 2020 Copa Libertadores Femenina. This was the 2nd edition of the Women's Copa Perú.

Universitario won their ninth title after defeating Amazon Sky by a 6–1 score in the final. As champions, Universitario qualified for the 2020 Copa Libertadores Femenina.

In 2020, the main tournament was renamed as Liga Femenina while the Campeonato Nacional de Fútbol Femenino served as the basis for structuring the second-level league competition that was designated as Copa Perú Femenina.

== Departamental Stage ==
Department	Team
Amazonas	Real Chachapoyas
Ancash	Valores Ancashinos
Apurímac	Angelu Lucrecia
Arequipa	Stella Maris
Ayacucho	Real Victoria
Cajamarca	Queens United
Callao	—
Cusco	Social Melgar
Huánuco	Academia Aucayacu
Huánuco	Botica 24 Horas
Huancavelica	Defensor Canchapata
Ica	Soccer Ica
Junín	Flamengo
La Libertad	Juventud Talentos
Lambayeque	Juventus Ferreñafe
Lima	Universitario
Lima	Alianza Lima

Department	Team
Lima Province	JC Sport Girls
Lima Province	Partizán Barranco
Lima Province	Talemtus Callao
Lima Province	Villa Libertad
Lima Province	Atletic San Miguel
Lima Province	Athletic Villa
Loreto	Amazon Sky
Madre de Dios	Hospital Santa Rosa
Moquegua	Bolívar Academia UJCM
Pasco	Sport Garza
Pasco	Sport Yanahuanca
Piura	UNP
Puno	Retto Hungaritos
San Martín	—
Tacna	Defensor UNTAC
Tumbes	—
Ucayali	Soria & Wong

== Zona Lima ==
=== Standings ===
Pos	Team	Pld	W	D	L	GF	GA	GD	Pts	Qualification or relegation	UNI	CRI	MUN	ALI	USM	UCV	CAN	SBA
1	Universitario	14	13	1	0	78	3	+75	40	Advance to Region IV		1–0	6–1	1–0	7–0	8–0	6–0	7–0
2	Sporting Cristal	14	9	2	3	62	15	+47	29	Advance to Playoffs	0–2		5–2	1–0	10–0	1–1	9–1	10–0
3	Deportivo Municipal	14	8	2	4	35	24	+11	26	Advance to Playoffs	1–2	1–1		1–0	5–2	4–2	5–1	3–0
4	Alianza Lima	14	6	4	4	28	14	+14	22	Advance to Playoffs	1–1	2–4	2–2		3–0	2–0	3–1	6–0
5	Universidad San Martín	14	6	1	7	20	43	−23	19	Advance to Playoffs	0–8	2–0	3–0	1–1		3–2	3–0	2–1
6	Universidad César Vallejo	14	5	1	8	26	34	−8	16		0–4	0–3	0–2	1–4	3–2		4–1	5–0
7	Academia Cantolao	14	3	1	10	14	61	−47	10		0–18	1–4	0–4	1–1	3–1	2–0		3–1
8	Sport Boys	14	0	0	14	2	71	−69	0		0–5	0–14	0–4	0–3	0–1	0–6	0–2	

Rules for classification: 1) Points; 2) Goal difference; 3) Goals for; 4) Fair play points; 5) Drawing of lots.

=== Playoffs ===
Team 1	Score	Team 2
Alianza Lima	4–0	Deportivo Municipal
Sporting Cristal	3–0	Universidad San Martín

=== Semifinal ===
Team 1	Score	Team 2
Alianza Lima	1–1 (3–2 p)	Sporting Cristal

=== Final ===
Team 1	Score	Team 2
Universitario	2–1	Alianza Lima

== Liga Departamental de Lima ==
=== Octogonal Final ===
Pos	Team	Pld	W	D	L	GF	GA	GD	Pts	Qualification or relegation	JCS	PAR	TAL	LIB	ASM	VIL	IDO	PRE
1	JC Sport Girls	7	6	1	0	16	4	+12	19	Advance to Region IV		2–1		1–0	6–0			3–2
2	Partizan Barranco	7	6	0	1	18	3	+15	18	Advance to Region IV			1–0			2–0		8–0
3	Talemtus Callao	7	4	2	1	11	5	+6	14	Advance to Region IV	1–1				2–1	2–0	3–1	
4	Villa Libertad	7	3	1	3	13	9	+4	10	Advance to Region IV		0–3	1–1		2–1			
5	Atletic San Miguel	7	3	0	4	14	15	−1	9	Advance to Region IV		0–1				4–2	3–1	5–1
6	Athletic Villa	7	2	1	4	7	11	−4	7	Advance to Region IV	0–1			2–1				3–1
7	El Ídolo	7	0	2	5	5	16	−11	2		0–2	1–2		1–5		0–0		
8	FC Premier	7	0	1	6	5	26	−21	1				0–2	0–4			1–1	

Rules for classification: 1) Points; 2) Goal difference; 3) Goals for; 4) Fair play points; 5) Drawing of lots.

== Regional stage ==
=== Region I ===
Pos	Team	Pld	W	D	L	GF	GA	GD	Pts	Qualification or relegation	JUV	UNP	REA
1	Juventus Fereñafe	2	2	0	0	6	0	+6	6	Advance to National Stage			4–0
2	UNP	2	1	0	1	4	2	+2	3		0–2		
3	Real Chachapoyas	2	0	0	2	0	8	−8	0			4–0	

Rules for classification: 1) Points; 2) Goal difference; 3) Goals for; 4) Fair play points; 5) Drawing of lots.

=== Region II ===
==== Semifinals ====
Team 1	Score	Team 2
Juventud Talentos	7–1	Valores Ancashinos

==== Final ====
Team 1	Score	Team 2
Juventud Talentos	1–0	Queens United

=== Region III ===
Team 1	Score	Team 2
Amazon Sky	3–1	Soria & Wong

=== Region IV ===
==== Group A ====
Pos	Team	Pld	W	D	L	GF	GA	GD	Pts	Qualification or relegation	ALI	PAR	VIL	TAL
1	Alianza Lima	3	3	0	0	18	0	+18	9	Advance to Regional Final		5–0	9–0	
2	Partizán Barranco	3	2	0	1	6	5	+1	6					2–0
3	Villa Libertad	3	1	0	2	3	13	−10	3			0–4		
4	Talemtus Callao	3	0	0	3	0	9	−9	0		0–4		0–3	

Rules for classification: 1) Points; 2) Goal difference; 3) Goals for; 4) Fair play points; 5) Drawing of lots.

==== Group B ====
Pos	Team	Pld	W	D	L	GF	GA	GD	Pts	Qualification or relegation	UNI	JCS	SM	ATV
1	Universitario	3	3	0	0	19	0	+19	9	Advance to Regional Final		5–0	10–0	
2	JC Sport Girls	3	2	0	1	13	8	+5	6					7–1
3	Atletic San Miguel	3	1	0	2	4	17	−13	3			2–6		2–1
4	Athletic Villa	3	0	0	3	2	13	−11	0		0–4			

Rules for classification: 1) Points; 2) Goal difference; 3) Goals for; 4) Fair play points; 5) Drawing of lots.

==== Regional Final ====
Team 1	Score	Team 2
Universitario	2–1	Alianza Lima

=== Region V ===
==== First Round ====
Team 1	Agg.	Team 2	1st leg	2nd leg
Flamengo	9–3	Academia Aucayacu	5–2	4–1
Botica 24 Horas	14–2	Sport Yanahuanca	10–1	4–1
Echa Muni	5–0	Sport Garza	2–0	3–0

==== Semifinals ====
Team 1	Agg.	Team 2	1st leg	2nd leg
Botica 24 Horas	1–1 (4–3 p)	Echa Muni	0–1	1–0
Flamengo	5–2	Sport Garza	2–1	3–1

==== Final ====
Team 1	Agg.	Team 2	1st leg	2nd leg
Flamengo	2–1	Botica 24 Horas	0–1	2–0

=== Region VI ===
Pos	Team	Pld	W	D	L	GF	GA	GD	Pts	Qualification or relegation	VIC	SOC	DEF
1	Real Victoria	2	2	0	0	8	0	+8	6	Advance to National Stage		3–0	
2	Soccer Ica	2	1	0	1	3	4	−1	3				3–1
3	Defensor Canchapata	2	0	0	2	1	8	−7	0			0–5	

Rules for classification: 1) Points; 2) Goal difference; 3) Goals for; 4) Fair play points; 5) Drawing of lots.

=== Region VII ===
Pos	Team	Pld	W	D	L	GF	GA	GD	Pts	Qualification or relegation	STE	UNT	UJC
1	Stella Maris	2	2	0	0	9	2	+7	6	Advance to National Stage		3–1	
2	Defensor UNTAC	2	1	0	1	6	0	+6	3				5–4
3	Bolívar Academia UJCM	2	0	0	2	5	11	−6	0		1–6		

Rules for classification: 1) Points; 2) Goal difference; 3) Goals for; 4) Fair play points; 5) Drawing of lots.

=== Region VIII ===
==== Semifinals ====
Team 1	Score	Team 2
Angelu Lucrecia	4–0	Retto Hungaritos
Social Melgar	7–0	Hospital Santa Rosa

==== Final ====
Team 1	Score	Team 2
Angelu Lucrecia	4–0	Social Melgar

== National stage ==
=== Quarterfinals ===
17 December 2019	Stella Maris	5–0	Juventus Ferreñafe	Colegio Mariano Melgar, Lima
08:00	1'; 19'; 65'; 67'; 81'

17 December 2019	Juventud Talentos	3–2	Ángelu Lucrecia	Villa Deportiva Nacional, Lima
11:00

17 December 2019	Real Victoria	2–4	Amazon Sky	Colegio Mariano Melgar, Lima
11:00	65'; 80'		22'; 31'; 61'; 85'

17 December 2019	Universitario	5–0	Flamengo	Colegio Mariano Melgar, Lima
14:00	Sabrina Ramírez; Gianella Romero; Esthefany Espino; Cindy Novoa

=== Semifinals ===
19 December 2019	Amazon Sky	1–0	Stella Maris	Villa Deportiva Nacional, Lima
11:00	Yelka Bardales

19 December 2019	Universitario	2–0	Juventud Talentos	Villa Deportiva Nacional, Lima
13:30	Alondra Vilchez; Cindy Novoa

=== Final ===
21 December 2019	Universitario	6–1	Amazon Sky	Estadio Universidad San Marcos, Lima
11:00	Sabrina Ramírez 5' 57'; Scarleth Flores 13' 67'; Jhuliana Chávez 37'; Alondra Vilchez 64'		Ángela Guimack
