= 2002 Campeonato Metropolitano de Fútbol Femenino (Peru) =

Campeonato Nacional de Fútbol Femenino
- Season: 2002
- Champions: Universitario

The 2002 Campeonato Metropolitano de Fútbol Femenino season, also known as the Copa Pilsen Callao, was an amateur women's football championship, developed, organized, and promoted by the Peruvian Football Federation (FPF).

Universitario won their fourth title by highest score in the aggregate table.

== Teams ==
Team	City
Deportivo AMASB	Lima
Deportivo Municipal	Lima
Santa Olga	Lima
Sport Boys	Callao
Universidad Agraria	Lima
Universidad de Lima	Lima
Universidad San Marcos	Lima
Universitario	Lima

== Torneo Apertura ==
=== Standings ===
Pos	Team	Pld	W	D	L	GF	GA	GD	Pts	Qualification or relegation
1	Universitario	14	13	1	0	0	0	0	40	Apertura winner
2	Sport Boys	0	0	0	0	0	0	0	0	
3	Universidad San Marcos	0	0	0	0	0	0	0	0	
4	Deportivo Municipal	0	0	0	0	0	0	0	0	
5	Universidad Agraria	0	0	0	0	0	0	0	0	
6	Universidad de Lima	0	0	0	0	0	0	0	0	
7	Santa Olga	0	0	0	0	0	0	0	0	
8	Deportivo AMASB	0	0	0	0	0	0	0	0	

Rules for classification: 1) Points; 2) Goal difference; 3) Goals for; 4) Fair play points; 5) Drawing of lots.

== Torneo Clausura ==
=== Standings ===
Pos	Team	Pld	W	D	L	GF	GA	GD	Pts	Qualification or relegation	SBA	UNI	USM	MUN	UAG	ULI	OLG	AMA
1	Sport Boys	14	12	1	1	71	7	+64	37	Clausura winner		1–1	3–0	7–0	8–1	4–0	12–0	2–0
2	Universitario	14	12	1	1	46	7	+39	37		3–2		6–2	4–1	7–0	2–0	7–0	2–0
3	Universidad San Marcos	14	10	0	4	27	19	+8	30		1–3	1–0		2–4	2–0	2–0	2–0	2–0
4	Deportivo Municipal	14	9	0	5	26	24	+2	27		1–3	0–1	1–2		2–1	3–0	3–0	2–0
5	Universidad Agraria	14	5	0	9	14	37	−23	15		0–8	0–3	2–3	0–2		0–1	1–0	2–0
6	Universidad de Lima	14	5	0	9	12	35	−23	15		0–9	0–4	0–2	2–3	0–3		3–2	2–0
7	Santa Olga	14	2	0	12	9	48	−39	6		0–6	0–4	0–4	1–2	1–2	1–2		2–0
8	Deportivo AMASB	14	0	0	14	0	28	−28	0		0–2	0–2	0–2	0–2	0–2	0–2	0–2	

Rules for classification: 1) Points; 2) Goal difference; 3) Goals for; 4) Fair play points; 5) Drawing of lots.
