= 2014 Campeonato Nacional de Fútbol Femenino (Perú) =

Campeonato Nacional de Fútbol Femenino
- Season: 2014
- Champions: Universitario
- Runner up: Alfredo Vargas Guerra
- Copa Libertadores: Universitario

The 2014 Campeonato Nacional de Fútbol Femenino season, was an amateur women's football championship, developed, organized, and promoted by the Peruvian Football Federation (FPF), which granted the classification to the 2015 Copa Libertadores Femenina.

Universitario won their sixth title after defeating Alfredo Vargas Guerra by a 7–0 score in the finals. As champions, Universitario qualified for the 2015 Copa Libertadores Femenina.

== Regional Stage ==
Department	Team
Apurímac	Angelu Lucrecia
Arequipa	Internacional
Ayacucho	Percy Berrocal
Ica	Alas Peruanas
Huánuco	León de Huánuco
Lima	Universitario
Loreto	Alfredo Vargas Guerra
Ucayali	Sport Willy

== National stage ==
=== Grupo A ===
Pos	Team	Pld	W	D	L	GF	GA	GD	Pts	Qualification or relegation	ALF	INT	PER	LEO
1	Alfredo Vargas Guerra	3	3	0	0	8	3	+5	9	Advance to Final		2–1		4–1
2	Internacional	3	2	0	1	11	2	+9	6				5–0	
3	Percy Berrocal	2	0	0	2	1	7	−6	0		1–2			—
4	León de Huánuco	2	0	0	2	1	9	−8	0			0–5		

Rules for classification: 1) Points; 2) Goal difference; 3) Goals for; 4) Fair play points; 5) Drawing of lots.

=== Grupo B ===
Pos	Team	Pld	W	D	L	GF	GA	GD	Pts	Qualification or relegation	UNI	ALA	LUC	WIL
1	Universitario	3	3	0	0	15	0	+15	9	Advance to Final		6–0		5–0
2	Alas Peruanas	3	2	0	1	3	7	−4	6					1–0
3	Angelu Lucrecia	2	0	0	2	1	6	−5	0		0–4	1–2		
4	Sport Willy	2	0	0	2	0	6	−6	0				—	

Rules for classification: 1) Points; 2) Goal difference; 3) Goals for; 4) Fair play points; 5) Drawing of lots.

== Final ==
8 May 2015	Universitario	7–0	Alfredo Vargas Guerra	VIDENA, Chincha
	Cindy Novoa 2'; Pierina Núñez 4'; Scarleth Flores 21'; Emily Flores 49'; Arantxa Vega 55'; Even Pizango 60' (pen.); Rocio Fernández 80'
