= 2025 Liga de Ascenso Femenina (Peru) =

Liga de Ascenso Femenina
- Season: 2025
- Dates: 18 October – 27 November 2025
- Champions: Deportivo Yanapuma (1st title)

The 2025 Liga de Ascenso Femenina season was an amateur women's football championship, developed, organized, and promoted by the Peruvian Football Federation (FPF), which granted two direct promotion spots to the 2026 Liga Femenina. This was the 3rd edition of the Liga de Ascenso Femenina, and for the fourth time it had a second-division character, granting direct promotion to the Liga Femenina.

Deportivo Yanapuma from Iquitos were crowned national champions and earned promotion to the 2026 Liga Femenina, becoming the first team from Loreto to reach this level.

== Fase I Departamental Stage ==
Department	Team	Location
Amazonas	Real Chachapoyas	Chachapoyas
Ancash	River Plate	Casma
Apurímac	Atlético Andahuaylas	Andahuaylas
Arequipa	FD Galaxy	Majes
Ayacucho	Deportivo Huáscar	Ayacucho
Cajamarca	Deportivo Rayma	Cajamarca
Callao	Sport Boys	Callao
Cusco	Deportivo Garcilaso	Cusco
Huánuco	Pillko City	Huánuco
Huancavelica	—	—
Ica	Soccer Ica	Ica
Junín	Deportivo Fénix	Huancayo

Department	Team	Location
La Libertad	Trujillanos	Trujillo
Lambayeque	Zafra FC	Chiclayo
Lima	Colmillo Comas	Comas
Loreto	Deportivo Yanapuma	Iquitos
Madre de Dios	—	—
Moquegua	Bolívar Academia UJCM	Moquegua
Pasco	—	—
Piura	Sporting Piura	Piura
Puno	FST Barza San Román	Juliaca
San Martín	Tomodachi	Tarapoto
Tacna	Glorioso Zepita	Tacna
Tumbes	Escuela de Talentos El Triunfo	Tumbes
Ucayali	Shipibo FC	Pucallpa

== Fase II Inter Regional ==
=== First Stage ===
The round was played on 18 and 19 October, in a single knock-out match format.

Team 1	Score	Team 2
Deportivo Rayma	3–2	Escuela de Talentos El Triunfo
Zafra FC	2–5	Real Chachapoyas
Sporting Piura	0–1	River Plate
Trujillanos	2–0	Sport Boys
Tomodachi FC	2–0	Shipibo FC
Deportivo Fénix	0–0 (2–1 p)	Pillko City
Colmillo Comas	1–1 (4–5 p)	Deportivo Huáscar
FD Galaxy	2–5	Deportivo Garcilaso
FST Barza San Román	0–7	Atlético Andahuaylas
Glorioso Zepita	6–3	Bolívar Academia UJCM

=== Second Stage ===
The round was played on 1 and 2 November, in a single knock-out match format.

Team 1	Score	Team 2
Deportivo Rayma	0–1	Real Chachapoyas
River Plate	0–0 (4–5 p)	Trujillanos
Tomodashi FC	0–2	Deportivo Fénix
Deportivo Yanapuma	3–1	Soccer Ica
Deportivo Garcilaso	3–0	Deportivo Huáscar
Glorioso Zepita	1–2	Atlético Andahuaylas

=== Third Stage ===
The round was played on 15 and 16 November, in a single knock-out match format.

Team 1	Score	Team 2
Real Chachapoyas	1–3	Trujillanos
Deportivo Yanapuma	0–0 (3–1 p)	Deportivo Fénix
Atlético Andahuaylas	2–1	Deportivo Garcilaso

== Fase III Final Nacional ==
=== Standings ===
Pos	Team	Pld	W	D	L	GF	GA	GD	Pts	Qualification or relegation	YAN	AND	TRU	FEN
1	Deportivo Yanapuma (C)	3	2	1	0	5	4	+1	7	Advance to 2026 Liga Femenina				3–1
2	Atlético Andahuaylas	3	1	2	0	5	4	+1	5	Advance to 2026 Liga Femenina	1–1			
3	Trujillanos	3	1	0	2	2	3	−1	3		0–1	1–2		
4	Deportivo Fénix	3	0	1	2	3	6	−3	1			2–2	0–1	

Updated to match(es) played on unknown. Source:
Legend: Blue = home team win; Yellow = draw; Red = away team win.
Rules for classification: 1) Points; 2) Goal difference; 3) Goals for; 4) Fair play points; 5) Drawing of lots.
(C) Champions

=== Results ===
==== Round 1 ====
24 November 2025	Trujillanos	0–1	Deportivo Yanapuma	Estadio Julio Lores Colán, Huaral
08:15			July Cachique 14'

24 November 2025	Deportivo Fénix	2–2	Atlético Andahuaylas	Estadio Julio Lores Colán, Huaral
10:30	Magaly Soto 10'; Tania Catay 86'		Johana López 50'; Andrea Murillo 79'	Referee: Carla Peña

==== Round 2 ====
25 November 2025	Trujillanos	1–2	Atlético Andahuaylas	Estadio Julio Lores Colán, Huaral
13:15	Rosa Monzón 43'		Marleny Cárdenas 57' 85'	Referee: Carla Peña

25 November 2025	Deportivo Yanapuma	3–1	Deportivo Fénix	Estadio Julio Lores Colán, Huaral
15:30	Gianella Rojas 43'; Ariana Jara 65' 69'		Yenifer Yanasupo 77'

==== Round 3 ====
27 November 2025	Deportivo Fénix	0–1	Trujillanos	Estadio Julio Lores Colán, Huaral
08:15			Rosa Monzón 46'

27 November 2025	Atlético Andahuaylas	1–1	Deportivo Yanapuma	Estadio Julio Lores Colán, Huaral
10:30	Johana López 3'		Gianella Rojas 16'

== See also ==
- 2025 Liga Femenina
