= Buena Vista Alta District =

Coordinates: 8°58′01″S 78°07′01″W

Buena Vista Alta
- District
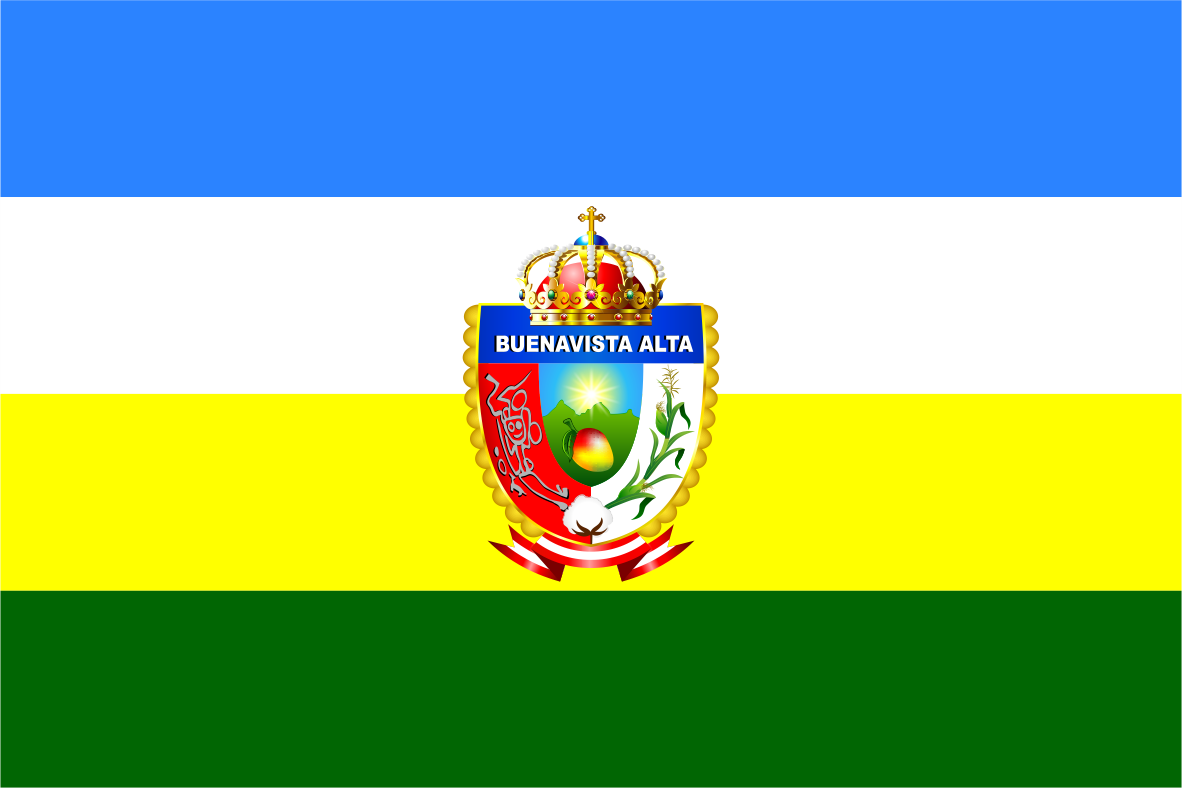
- Flag of Buena Vista Alta
- Interactive map of Buena Vista Alta
- Country: Peru
- Region: Ancash
- Province: Casma
- Founded: April 5, 1935
- Capital: Buena Vista Alta

Government
  - Mayor: Maximo Pedro Vargas Cutamanca

Area
  - Total: 476.62 km^{2} (184.02 sq mi)
- Elevation: 216 m (709 ft)

Population (2005 census)
  - Total: 4,156
  - Density: 8.720/km^{2} (22.58/sq mi)
- Time zone: UTC-5 (PET)
- UBIGEO: 020802

Buena Vista Alta District is one of four districts of the province Casma in Peru.
