= Comas District =

Comas District may refer to:

- Comas District, Lima
- Comas District, Concepción
