= Casma District =

District in the Ancash region of Peru

Casma
- District
- Interactive map of Casma
- Coordinates: 9°28′01″S 78°19′01″W
- Country: Peru
- Region: Ancash
- Province: Casma
- Capital: Casma

Government
  - Mayor: José Luis Lomparte Monteza

Area
  - Total: 1,206.28 km^{2} (465.75 sq mi)
- Elevation: 39 m (128 ft)

Population (2005 census)
  - Total: 28,140
  - Density: 23.33/km^{2} (60.42/sq mi)
- Time zone: UTC-5 (PET)
- UBIGEO: 020801

Casma District is one of four districts of the province Casma in Peru.
