= Club Universitario de Deportes (women) =

Peruvian football club

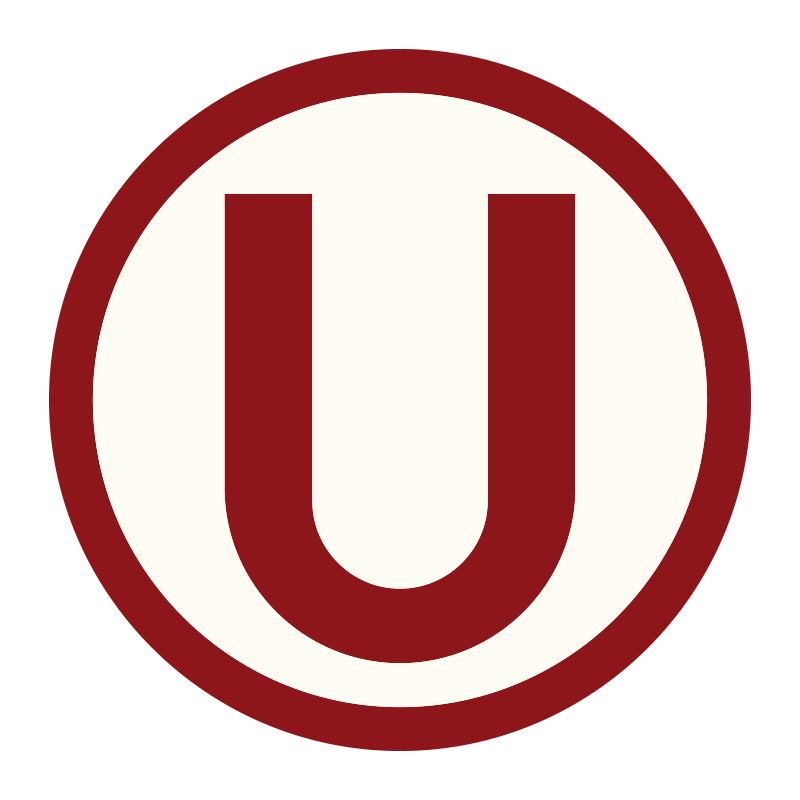
- Nicknames: Las Cremas (The Creams); Las Merengues; La U
- Founded: 1952
- Stadium: Estadio Monumental "U"
- Chairman: Álvaro Barco
- Coach: Andrés Usme
- League: Liga Femenina
- 2025: Liga Femenina, 2nd of 13
- Website: universitario.pe
Home colours	Away colours	Third colours

The Club Universitario de Deportes Femenino is the women's football section of Club Universitario de Deportes. It was first formed in 1952 and currently participates in the Primera División Femenina, where it has played since the first official tournament organized in 1996 by the Peruvian Football Federation.

To date, it is the team that has won the Primera División title the most times (ten times), in its various different formats. The club also has a "Women's Football Academy" for girls between 10 and 17 years old. It has also participated five times in the Copa Libertadores Femenina.

On several occasions, players from Universitario have represented Peru in its women's national football team, notably the participation of players Vivian Ayres, Lorena Bosmans and Aissa Garibay, who finished in third place in the 1998 South American Women's Football Championship.

== History ==
=== Formation ===
The Club Universitario de Deportes was founded on 7 August 1924 in Lima, Peru, under the name of Federación Universitaria de Fútbol, as an initiative of a group of students from the National University of San Marcos intended to promote the practice of football, being one of the most important, oldest and current sports clubs in the country.

Although initially focused primarily on men's football, its student origins and deep popular and social roots led Universitario to take an early interest in incorporating women into the sport (as well as in other sports), thus forming its first women's football team in 1952. This was one of the earliest efforts to provide an organized space for women's football in Peru. During these tournaments, along with Sporting Cristal and Sport Boys, they laid the foundations for professional women's football in the country.

However, in those years women's football competitions were not official and were usually held as exhibition events without continuity. Furthermore, due to the lack of support and official recognition, the development of women's football was hampered for a long time. Female footballers faced discrimination, a lack of adequate infrastructure, and a scarcity of opportunities to compete at national and international levels.

=== Amateur era: Back-to-back championships (1996–2000) ===
It was only in 1996 that the Peruvian Football Federation created the Primera División Femenina and organized the first official women's club football championship, under the name of the Metropolitan Championship. At the end of this season, Universitario won the title, becoming the first champion in the history of women's football in Peru after defeating Santa Olga 6–0 on the final matchday. The following year, Universitario topped the national tournament and became back-to-back champions of Peruvian football after defeating Sporting Cristal 2–1 in the title final at the National Stadium, with two goals from Aissa Garibay.

=== First three-peat championships (2001–2013) ===
Later, Universitario would mark another milestone by achieving the first official three-peat in women's football, winning the titles in 2001, 2002, and 2003. In these seasons, the participation of player Vivian Ayres stood out, who would become the club's all-time leading scorer during those years. After a few years of absence, in the 2011 Torneo Metropolitano, which granted a berth in the 2011 season, Las Cremas' finished in sixth place. In 2012, they participated in the Torneo Apertura and Clausura of the Torneo Metropolitano, which granted a berth in the 2012 season. The coach was Víctor Cañete. In the Apertura, they finished in seventh place after obtaining 1 win, 2 draws, and 4 losses. In the 2013 Torneo Apertura, Universitario finished in eighth place with 14 points, while in the Torneo Clausura, they finished in third place with 20 points, the same amount as Real Maracaná and five points behind JC Sport Girls who were crowned champions of the Torneo.

=== Second three-peat championships (2014–2018) ===
In the 2014 season, Universitario was part of Group B. On the first matchday, Las Cremas defeated Sport Willy of San Martín 5-0 . The following day, they beat Lucrecia FC of Apurímac 4–0. They then defeated Club Alas Peruanas of Ica 6–0, thus qualifying for the final in first place. The title match was played on May 8 at the National Sports Village. Universitario won the championship, defeating Alfredo Vargas Guerra of Mazán 7–0. The goals were scored by seven different players. This victory gave Universitario its sixth first division title and its first under the national tournament format. The following season, the club was crowned metropolitan champion again. In the national competition, they were part of Group A, defeating Club Retamozo 10–0, Club Internacional de Arequipa 4–0, and Colegio Nacional Inca Huiracocha 12–0. They would later become two-time national champions after defeating CGTP 8–0 in the final at VIDENA, with four goals from Emily Flores and another from Rocío Fernández. The title allowed them to qualify for the 2015 Copa Libertadores Femenina.

In the 2016 season, Universitario was part of Group A, where they defeated Universidad de Piura 11–0, Majes de Arequipa 4–1, and Región II de Trujillo 5–1. This qualified them for the final, which they won 5–1 against Club Ramiro Villaverde with goals from Emily Flores, Alondra Vilchez, Even Pizango, and Pierina Chávez, securing the title that year and the second three-peat in the history of women's football in Peru.

In 2018, the Copa Perú Femenina was held, a championship to determine Peru 's representative in the 2019 Copa Libertadores Femenina. In the group stage of the departmental stage of the Copa, Universitario won 3–0 by forfeit against Inter JC, while in the second match they defeated Villa Libertad 2–0. In the third and final match, Universitario lost 3–0 against JC Sport Girls. These results did not allow the "Las Leonas" to advance to the departmental final, and therefore they were eliminated at this stage. In the 2019 Lima Zone Regular Tournament, Universitario finished in first place with 40 points from 13 wins and 1 draw, allowing them to play in the tournament final against Alianza Lima, whom they defeated 2–1 at the Estadio Nacional.

=== Ninth league championship (2019) ===
In the Metropolitan Championship, the Universitario was part of Group B. After defeating JC Sport Girls 5–0 , Athletic San Miguel 10–0, and Athletic Villa 4–0, the club qualified for the regional final, where they faced Alianza Lima again . In this final, "La U" won 2–1 in front of a large crowd at the National Stadium. Having won the regional stage, the club participated in the 2019 Women's Copa Perú from the quarterfinals, where they defeated Flamengo FBC of Junín 5–0 on 17 December 2019. Two days later, they defeated Deportivo Talentos of La Libertad 2–0 in the semifinals . The final was played on 21 December at the San Marcos Stadium . In this match, "La U" defeated Amazon Sky of Loreto 6–1 and was crowned national champion. The goals were scored by Sabrina Ramirez, Scarleth Flores (two goals), Jhuliana Chávez, Esthefany Espino, and Alondra Vilchez. Ángela Guimack scored for the Loreto team.

=== Professional era (2020–present) ===
In 2020, the Peruvian Football Federation decided to professionalize women's football. In March 2021, Universitario played in the 2020 Copa Libertadores Femenina, earning one point after losing 8–0 to Corinthians, 5–0 to América de Cali, and drawing 1–1 against El Nacional. Domestically, 2021 finally marked the beginning of the professional era, now under the name of the Liga Femenina. Phase 1 began on 29 May 2021, in which Universitario finished second with 34 points. They defeated Sporting Cristal 1–0 in the semifinals, while losing to Alianza Lima 1–0 in the final after a defensive error. In October 2021, Paolo Maldonado was announced as the new manager of the women's team. In the 2022 Liga Femenina, Universitario did not qualify for the final, finishing third in the tournament. However, the following year, Universitario had a great season, reaching the final of the 2023 Women's League against Alianza Lima. They lost the first leg (0–1) at the Alejandro Villanueva Stadium, but came back to win the second leg (2-0) at the Monumental Stadium, thus securing the title that year and their tenth championship in the history of the women's first division. In that final, Universitario fans broke the national and South American attendance record for a women's football match with 42,107 spectators at the Monumental Stadium.

In the 2024 season, the team sought the coveted back-to-back championship, remaining among the league leaders throughout the campaign. However, in the final stage, they suffered a setback against Alianza Lima, losing 0–2 in the first leg and 3–1 in the second leg.

== Honours ==
Keys

- Record
- ^{(s)} Shared record

Type	Competition	Titles	Runner-up	Winning years	Runner-up years
National (League)	Liga Femenina	11	3	1996, 1997, 2001, 2002, 2003, 2014, 2015, 2016, 2019, 2023, 2026	2021, 2024, 2025
Half-year / Short; Tournament (League)	Torneo Apertura	4	1	1997–I, 2002, 2003, 2026	2025
Half-year / Short; Tournament (League)	Torneo Clausura	3	2	1997–II, 2025, 2026	2002, 2003
Regional (League)	Región IV	1	—	2019	—
Regional (League)	Zona Lima	4	—	2014, 2015, 2016, 2019	—

=== Youth team ===
Type	Competition	Titles	Runner-up	Winning years	Runner-up years
National (League)	Torneo Juvenil Femenino FPF Sub-14	1	—	2024	—

== Performance in CONMEBOL competitions ==
- Copa Libertadores Femenina: 6 appearances

2015: Group Stage
2016: Group Stage
2017: Group Stage
2020: Group Stage
2023: Group Stage
2026: Group Stage
