= Casma province =

Coordinates: 9.467°S 78.317°W

Casma
- Province
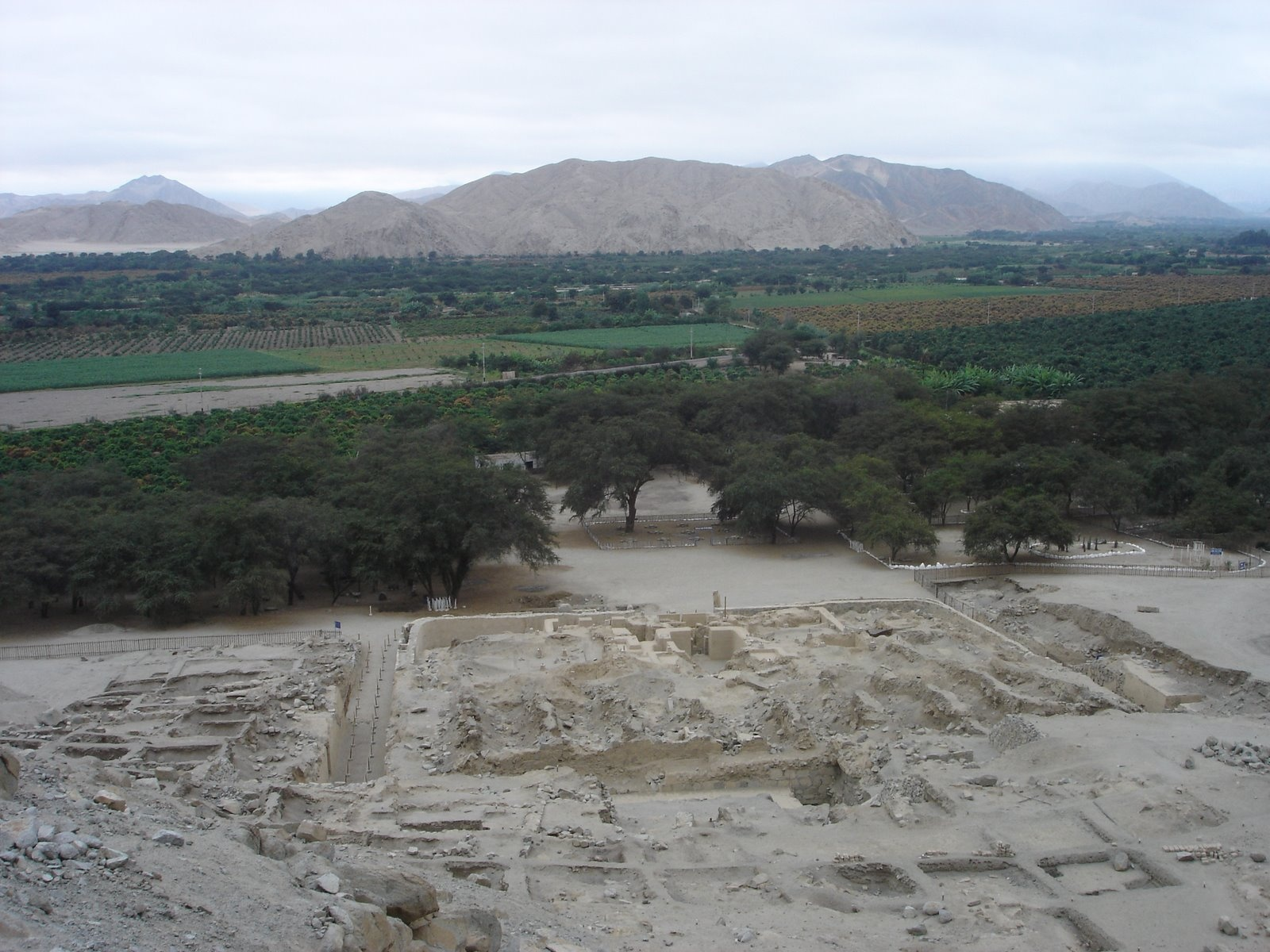
- Sechin complex in the Casma Valley

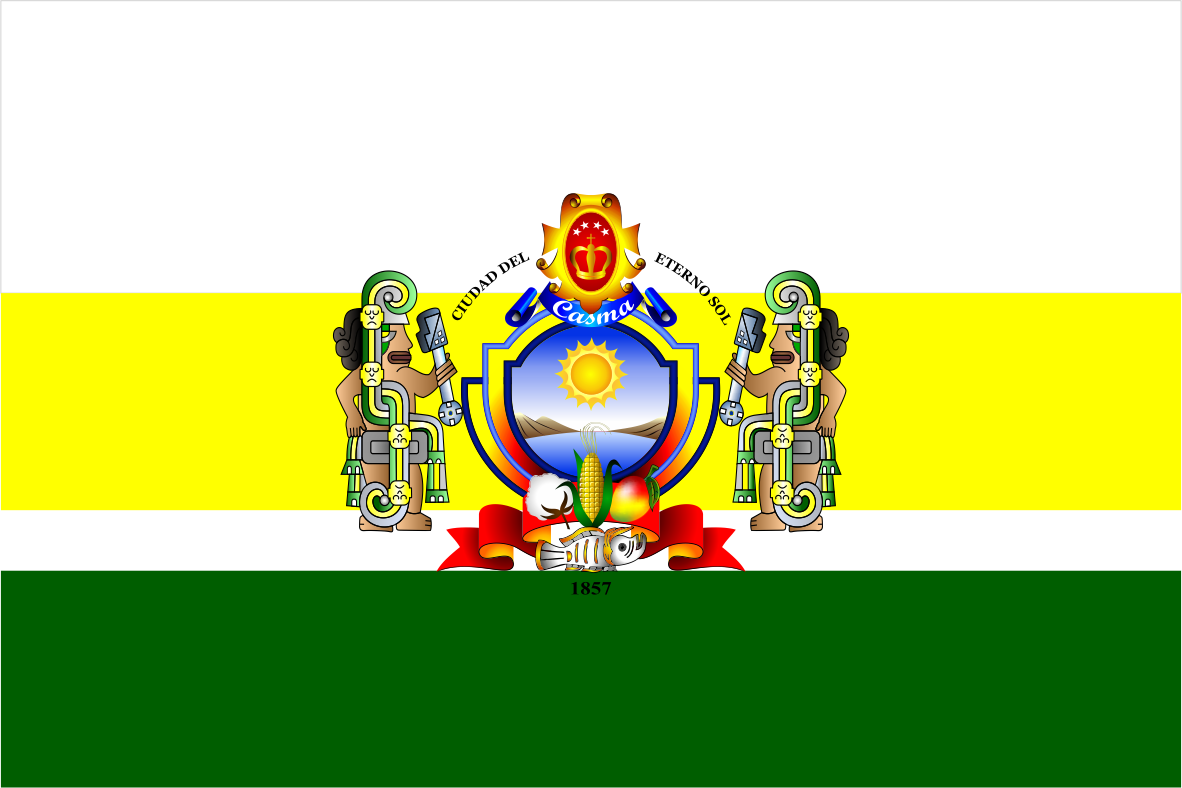
- Flag Coat of arms

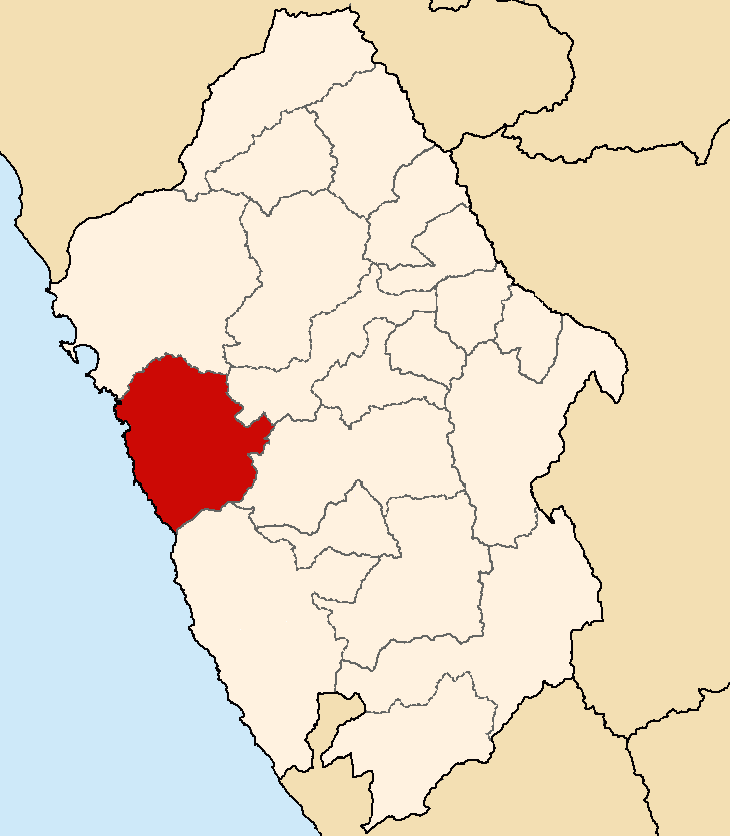
- Location of Casma in the Ancash Region
- Country: Peru
- Region: Ancash
- Capital: Casma

Government
  - Mayor: Luis Alarcón Llana (2019–2022)

Area
  - Total: 2,262.86 km^{2} (873.70 sq mi)

Population
  - Total: 50,989
  - Density: 22.533/km^{2} (58.360/sq mi)
- Website: www.casma.anc.mp.gob.pe

Casma is one of twenty provinces in the Ancash Region of Peru.

== Political division ==
Casma is divided into four districts:

| District | Mayor |
|---|---|
| Buena Vista Alta | Maximo Pedro Vargas Cutamanca |
| Casma | Jose Luis Lomparte Monteza |
| Comandante Noel | Jose Alejandro Montalvan Macedo |
| Yautan | Jose Luis Del Carpio Melgarejo |

== Ethnic groups ==
The province is inhabited by indigenous citizens of Quechua descent. Spanish is the language which the majority of the population (85.95%) learnt to speak in childhood. 13.82% of the residents started speaking using the Quechua language (2007 Peru Census).
