= Atlético Trujillo F.C. =

Venezuelan football club

Atlético Trujillo
- Full name: Unión Atlético Trujillo
- Nicknames: Guerreros Rojos, Furia Roja
- Founded: 2007
- Dissolved: 2009
- Ground: Estadio José Alberto Pérez; Valera, Venezuela
- Capacity: 25,000
- Chairman: Jorge Morales
- Manager: Rodrigo Piñón
- League: Segunda División Venezolana
- 2008–09: 4th
Home colours	Away colours

Unión Atlético Trujillo was a Venezuelan football team. It was based in Valera, and played their home games at the Estadio Luis Loreto Lira.

== History ==
Founded as Trujillanos FC B (Trujillanos FC's reserve team), it was renamed Unión Atlético Trujillo in 2007. After the expansion of Primera and Segunda División Venezolana, it achieved promotion in their first year.

In the end of 2008, the team was crowned champions of 2008 Torneo Apertura, achieving a first-ever promotion to the main category. However, in June 2009, prior to the 2009–10 season, the club was dissolved to become a part of Real Esppor; the latter achieved the top level promotion instead.

== Honours ==
- Segunda División Venezolana: Apertura 2008
