= Estadio Hugo Sotil =

Stadium in Lima, Peru

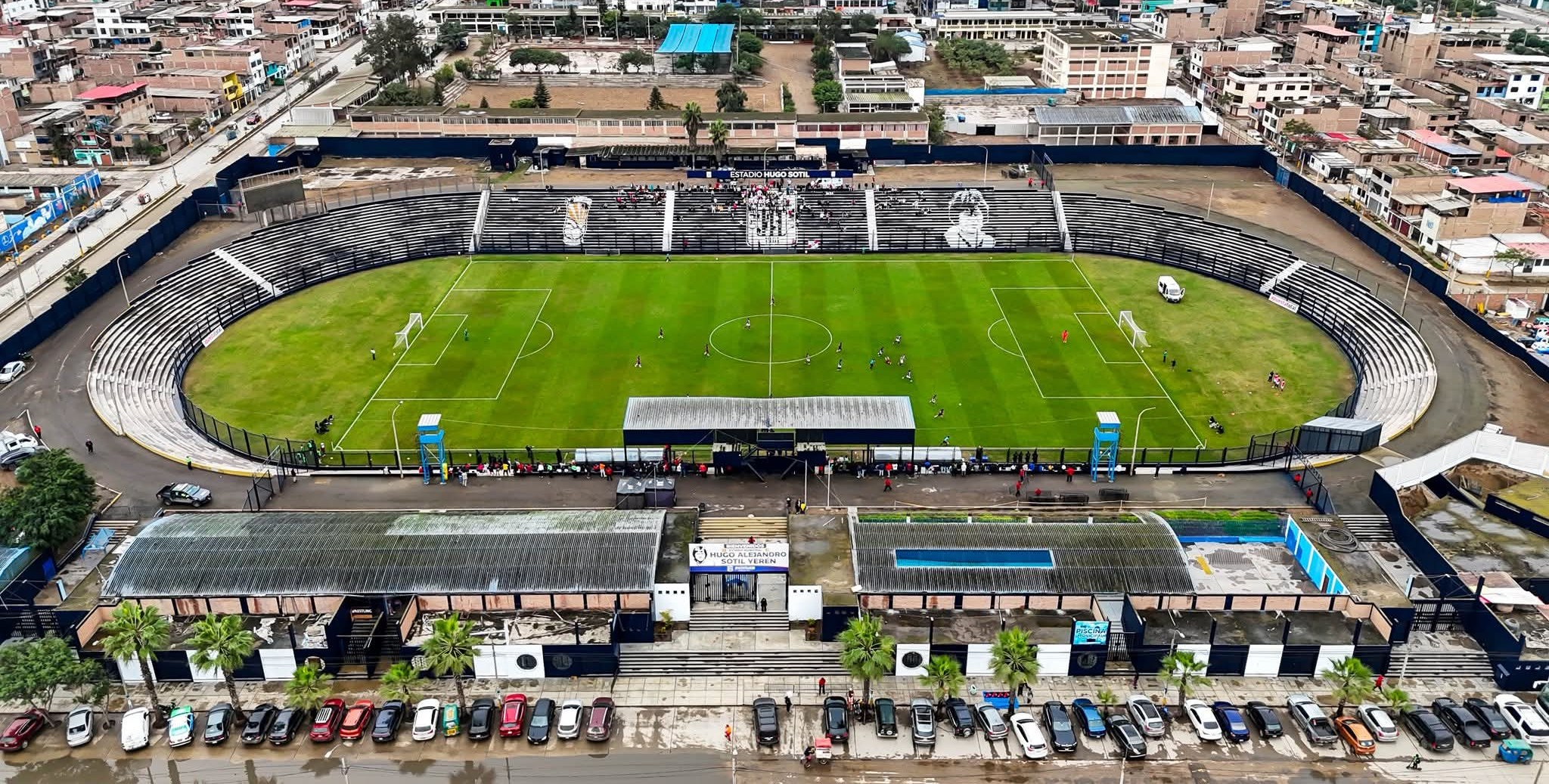
- Interactive map of Estadio Hugo Sotil
- Former names: Estadio Iván Elías Moreno (2002–2025)
- Location: Lima, Peru
- Coordinates: 12°13′12.38″S 76°56′5.73″W
- Owner: Municipalidad de Villa el Salvador
- Operator: Club Alianza Lima
- Capacity: 13,773
- Surface: Grass
- Field size: 105x68 m

Construction
- Opened: June 2, 2002
- Renovated: 2015–2016

Tenants
- Deportivo Municipal (2002–2025); Club Alianza Lima (2025-act.)

Estadio Hugo Sotil Yerén, formerly known as Estadio Iván Elías Moreno is a multi-purpose stadium in the Villa El Salvador District, Lima, Peru. It was used by Deportivo Municipal until 2025 where they moved to Estadio Municipal de Chorrillos. The stadium holds 13,773 people and named after Peruvian player Hugo Sotil. It is the home stadium for the Alianza Lima women's team and youth divisions.

== History ==
The plot turf where the stadium now stands was used by local amateur teams for many years before the construction of the stadium. The stadium is named after Iván Elías Moreno who was a young man from Villa El Salvador who was stabbed to death while trying to defend a teenager from being robbed. During his third term, district mayor Michel Azcueta decided to name the stadium to honor the memory of Moreno who had been his student while he, the mayor, was a school teacher in the district.

The inaugural game was between Defensor Villa del Mar and Guardia Republicana in the 2002 Peruvian Segunda Divisíon season in which the home team won by 4–0. Defensor Villa del Mar played its home games at this stadium until 2006 when it was relegated to the Copa Perú. Another three prominent teams have played their home matches at this stadium. Estudiantes de Medicina played one match at this stadium in 2006. In 2008, Raymondi Cashapampa won the Liga Provincial de Lima while playing its home matches at this stadium.
