= Vivian Ayres =

Peruvian football player and manager (born 1972)

Personal information
- Full name: Vivian Ayres Manrique
- Date of birth: 29 July 1972 (age 54)
- Place of birth: Lima, Peru
- Position: Midfielder

Senior career*
Years	Team	Apps	(Gls)
1996–1997	Universitario		
1998–1999	Sporting Cristal (women)		
2000	Sport Coopsol (women)		
2001–2003	Universitario		

International career
1998	Peru women	?	(1)

Managerial career
- 2016–2018: Peru women
- 2018: Peru women U20
- 2021–2022: Academia Cantolao (women)
- 2023: Deportivo Municipal (women)
- 2025: Sporting Cristal (women)
- * Club domestic league appearances and goals

Vivian Ayres Manrique (born 29 July 1972) is a Peruvian football manager and former player.

== Playing career ==
=== Club career ===
A key player for Universitario de Deportes, Vivian Ayres won five Peruvian championships (1996, 1997, 2001, 2002, 2003) and remains the club's all-time top scorer. She also played for Sporting Cristal between 1998 and 1999, where she won the league double.

=== International career ===
Called up for the 1998 South American Women's Football Championship in Argentina, Vivian Ayres distinguished herself in the match against Venezuela by opening the scoring in the 20th minute (2–1 victory). Peru finished in 3rd place in this tournament.

== Managerial career ==
Having become a coach, Ayres was appointed manager of the Peruvian women's national team in 2016. She coached the national team during the 2018 Copa América Femenina in Chile. She regularly coaches teams in the Peruvian women's league: Academia Cantolao in 2021, Deportivo Municipal in 2023 and Sporting Cristal in 2025.

== Honours ==
=== Player ===
Universitario

- Primera División Femenina (5): 1996, 1997, 2001, 2002, 2003

Sporting Cristal

- Primera División Femenina (2): 1998, 1999

Sport Coopsol

- Primera División Femenina: 2000
