= Estadio Juan Maldonado Gamarra =

Estadium in Cutervo, Perú

- Interactive map of Estadio Juan Maldonado Gamarra
- Full name: Estadio Juan Maldonado Gamarra
- Location: Cutervo, Peru
- Coordinates: 6°22′5″S 78°48′53″W
- Owner: Instituto Peruano del Deporte (IPD)
- Capacity: 12,000
- Surface: Artificial Grass

Construction
- Opened: 2014 (Reopened)

Tenants
- Comerciantes Unidos; Club Deportivo Los Inseparables

Estadio Juan Maldonado Gamarra is a multi-use stadium in Cutervo Province, Peru. It is used mostly for football matches and is the home stadium of Comerciantes Unidos of the Liga 1 Peru and Club Deportivo Los Inseparables of the Copa Perú. The stadium can hold 12,000 spectators.

== See also ==
- List of football stadiums in Peru
