= 2013 Copa Libertadores Femenina =

Tournament details
- Host country: Brazil
- Cities: Foz do Iguaçu, Brazil
- Dates: 27 October–7 November
- Teams: 12 (from 10 associations)
- Venues: 2 (in 1 host city)

Final positions
- Champions: (Brazil) São José (2nd title)
- Runners-up: (Colombia) Formas Íntimas
- Third place: (Chile) Colo Colo
- Fourth place: (Bolivia) Mundo Futuro

Tournament statistics
- Top scorer: (Bolivia) Maitté Zamorano (7 goals)

The 2013 Copa Libertadores Femenina was the fifth edition of the Copa Libertadores Femenina, CONMEBOL's premier annual international women's football club tournament. It was held in Foz do Iguaçu in Brazil. The competition was supposed to start on 12 October, just one week prior to that however, the whole competition was rescheduled from 27 October to 7 November due to logistical problems cited by the local organizing committee. Clubs were offered the possibility to change up to five players in their previously submitted squads.

Colo Colo were the defending champions. The title was won by São José, their second title after 2011.

Maitté Zamorano won the top-scorer award playing for Mundo Futuro by scoring seven goals.

== Qualification ==
The competition was contested by twelve teams, the champion club from each of the ten nations plus the title holders, Colo Colo, and one additional team from Brazil, the hosts. As Colo Colo had also won the Chilean championship, Everton de Viña del Mar participated additionally as runners-up.

Association	Team	Qualifying method
Argentina	Boca Juniors	2012–13 Clausura and Apertura champion
Bolivia	Mundo Futuro	2013 Bolivian League champion
Brazil	São José	2012 Copa do Brasil de Futebol Feminino champion
Brazil	Foz Cataratas	Host
Chile	Colo Colo	Title holder, also 2013 Chilean League champion
Chile	Everton	2013 Chilean League runners-up
Colombia	Formas Íntimas	2013 Copa Pre-Libertadores winner
Ecuador	Rocafuerte	2013 Ecuadoran league champion
Paraguay	Cerro Porteño	2012 Paraguayan League champion
Peru	JC Sport Girls	2012 Campeonato Nacional de Fútbol Femenino champion
Uruguay	Nacional	Qualification tournament winner
Venezuela	Estudiantes de Guárico	2013 Venezuelan League champions

== First stage ==
The group winner and the best runners-up advanced to the semifinals. The draw was held on 26 September 2013.

Key to colors in group tables
Group winners and runners-up advanced to the semi-finals

All times are Brasília time, UTC-03.

=== Group A ===
Mundo Futuro moved on to the semi-finals as best second placed team.

Team	Pld	W	D	L	GF	GA	GD	Pts
(Chile) Colo Colo	3	2	1	0	16	4	+12	7
(Bolivia) Mundo Futuro	3	2	1	0	7	4	+3	7
(Uruguay) Nacional	3	1	0	2	5	10	−5	3
(Peru) JC Sport Girls	3	0	0	3	2	12	−10	0

27 October 2013

Mundo Futuro (Bolivia)	1–0	(Peru) JC Sport Girls
Yanina Angeles Lopez 88'	Report

27 October 2013

Colo Colo (Chile)	5–1	(Uruguay) Nacional
Aedo 37'; Ascanio 46'; Sáez 50'; Soto 55'; Moroso 85'	Report	Florence Garrido 16'

29 October 2013

Nacional (Uruguay)	1–3	(Bolivia) Mundo Futuro
Lucía Cappelletti 72'	Report	Zamorano 20', 38', 89'

29 October 2013

Colo Colo (Chile)	8–0	(Peru) JC Sport Girls
Guerrero; Banini; Soto; Huenteo; Ascanio	Report

31 October 2013

Nacional (Uruguay)	3–2	(Peru) JC Sport Girls
Silvera 21'; Mariana Buidid 27'; Birizamberri 40'	Report	Liliana Neyra 17'; Chuquival 93'

31 October 2013

Colo Colo (Chile)	3–3	(Bolivia) Mundo Futuro
Soto 18'; Banini 25', 77'	Report	Morón 51', 59'; Zamorano 55'

=== Group B ===
Team	Pld	W	D	L	GF	GA	GD	Pts
(Brazil) São José	3	3	0	0	4	0	+4	9
(Paraguay) Cerro Porteño	3	2	0	1	11	4	+7	6
(Ecuador) Rocafuerte	3	1	0	2	3	4	−1	3
(Chile) Everton	3	0	0	3	1	11	−10	0

27 October 2013

Rocafuerte (Ecuador)	1–0	(Chile) Everton
Rodríguez 76' (pen.)	Report

27 October 2013

São José (Brazil)	1–0	(Paraguay) Cerro Porteño
Gislaine 73'	Report

29 October 2013

Cerro Porteño (Paraguay)	3–2	(Ecuador) Rocafuerte
Fernández 64', 71'; Fleitas 80'	Report	Palacios 47'; Vásquez 55'

29 October 2013

São José (Brazil)	2–0	(Chile) Everton
Formiga 71'; Mariana Pereira 85'	Report

31 October 2013

Cerro Porteño (Paraguay)	8–1	(Chile) Everton
Sanhueza 3' (o.g.); Peña 14', 32'; Jessica Santacruz 44'; Aquino 46', 55', 82'; Fleitas 48'	Report	Sanhueza 35'

31 October 2013

São José (Brazil)	1–0	(Ecuador) Rocafuerte
Giovânia 56'	Report

=== Group C ===
Team	Pld	W	D	L	GF	GA	GD	Pts
(Colombia) Formas Íntimas	3	2	1	0	6	2	+4	7
(Argentina) Boca Juniors	3	1	1	1	5	5	0	4
(Brazil) Foz Cataratas	3	0	2	1	3	5	−2	2
(Venezuela) Estudiantes de Guárico	3	0	2	1	2	4	−2	2

28 October 2013

Estudiantes de Guárico (Venezuela)	0–2	(Colombia) Formas Íntimas
	Report	Cuesta 31', 46'

28 October 2013

Foz Cataratas (Brazil)	1–3	(Argentina) Boca Juniors
Daiane Moretti 49' (pen.)	Report	Potassa 28'; Oviedo 31'; Brusca 83'

30 October 2013

Boca Juniors (Argentina)	1–1	(Venezuela) Estudiantes de Guárico
Potassa 15'	Report	Villamizar 45'

30 October 2013

Foz Cataratas (Brazil)	1–1	(Colombia) Formas Íntimas
Camila Grum Germano 45'	Report	Yesica Sánchez Duquino 61'

1 November 2013

Boca Juniors (Argentina)	1–3	(Colombia) Formas Íntimas
Ospina 37' (o.g.)		Ospina 34'; Usme 43'; Cuesta 68'

1 November 2013

Foz Cataratas (Brazil)	1–1	(Venezuela) Estudiantes de Guárico
Daiane Moretti 75'	Report	Altuve 32'

== Knockout stage ==
Per draw Group A and B winners met with the best second-place finisher meeting Group C winner in the semi-finals.

Semi-finals
4 November 2013
(Chile) Colo Colo	1 (0)
(Brazil) São José	1 (3)
4 November 2013
(Colombia) Formas Íntimas	4
(Bolivia) Mundo Futuro	1

Final
7 November 2013
(Brazil) São José	3
(Colombia) Formas Íntimas	1
Third place
7 November 2013
(Chile) Colo Colo	6
(Bolivia) Mundo Futuro	3

=== Semifinals ===
4 November 2013

Colo Colo (Chile)	1–1 (a.e.t.)	(Brazil) São José
Ascanio 60'	Report	Giovânia 89' (pen.)
Penalties
Soto (penalty missed); Lara (penalty missed); Guerrero (penalty missed)	0–3	(penalty scored) Fabiana Baiana; (penalty scored) Poliana; (penalty scored) Formiga

4 November 2013

Formas Íntimas (Colombia)	4–1	(Bolivia) Mundo Futuro
Cuesta 11'; Yesica Sánchez Duquino 26'; Jenifer Peñaloza 48'; Usme 73'	Report	Zamorano 81'

=== Third-place match ===
7 November 2013

Colo Colo (Chile)	6–3	(Bolivia) Mundo Futuro
Banini 21'; Huenteo 42', 49'; Catalina Silva 63'; Aedo 76'; Ascanio 86'	Report	Zamorano 39', 88'; Morón 71'

=== Final ===
7 November 2013

São José (Brazil)	3–1	(Colombia) Formas Íntimas
Priscilinha 11'; Dani 20'; Gislaine 53'		Ospina 10'
