= 2009 Copa Libertadores Femenina =

Tournament details
- Host country: Brazil
- Dates: 3–18 October
- Teams: 10 (from 10 associations)
- Venues: 4 (in 3 host cities)

Final positions
- Champions: (Brazil) Santos
- Runners-up: (Paraguay) Universidad Autónoma
- Third place: (Colombia) Formas Íntimas
- Fourth place: (Chile) Everton

Tournament statistics
- Matches played: 24
- Goals scored: 121 (5.04 per match)
- Top scorer: (Brazil) Cristiane (15 goals)
- Best player: (Brazil) Marta

The 2009 Copa Libertadores de Fútbol Femenino (officially Copa Santander Libertadores de Fútbol Femenino 2009) for sponsorship reasons) was the first edition of the Copa Libertadores Femenina, CONMEBOL's premier annual international women's club tournament. The competition was played in Santos, São Paulo and Guarujá, Brazil, from October 3 to 18, 2009.

Santos defeated Universidad Autónoma 9–0 to win their first Copa Libertadores Femenina title.

== Format ==
The cup was played by ten teams: one from each CONMEBOL country. The ten teams were divided in two groups of five clubs each for the First Stage. The two best-placed teams of each group qualified to play the semifinal and the winners then played the final, while the losers played the third-place game.

== Qualified teams ==
Association	Team	Qualifying method
Argentina	San Lorenzo	2008–09 Clausura/Apertura champions-playoff winner
Bolivia	EnForma Santa Cruz	2009 Bolivian League champion
Brazil	Santos	2008 Copa do Brasil winner
Chile	Everton	2008 Chilean League champion
Colombia	Formas Íntimas	appointed by Colombian Football Federation (no national league)
Ecuador	Deportivo Quito	
Paraguay	Universidad Autónoma	2008 Paraguayan league champions
Peru	White Star	2008 Campeonato Nacional de Fútbol Femenino champions
Uruguay	Rampla Juniors	2008 Campeonato Uruguayo Femenino winner
Venezuela	Caracas	2009 Venezuelan League champions

== Venues ==
Guarujá	São Paulo	Santos	
Estádio Antônio Fernandes; Capacity: 8,000	Estádio do Pacaembu; Capacity: 37,180	Estádio Ulrico Mursa; Capacity: 10,000	Estádio Urbano Caldeira; Capacity: 20,120

== Round and draw dates ==
The draw for the competition took place at Estádio Urbano Caldeira on September 6, 2009.

Event	Date
Draw	6 September 2009
First Stage	3–14 October 2009
Semifinals	16 October 2009
Final	18 October 2009

== First stage ==
The top two teams from each group advance to the Semifinals.

=== Group 1 ===
All Group 1 matches were played at Estádio Urbano Caldeira (better known as Vila Belmiro) in Santos.

Team	Pld	W	D	L	GF	GA	GD	Pts
(Brazil) Santos	4	4	0	0	29	2	+27	12
(Chile) Everton	4	2	1	1	10	4	+6	7
(Peru) White Star	4	2	0	2	7	9	−2	6
(Venezuela) Caracas	4	0	2	2	2	14	−12	2
(Bolivia) EnForma Santa Cruz	4	0	1	3	4	23	−19	1

October 3, 2009
22:00 UTC-3

Santos (Brazil)	3–1	(Peru) White Star
Cristiane 11', 34'; Marta 38'		Wilcox 90'

Estádio Urbano Caldeira, Santos
Attendance: 4,177
October 4, 2009
20:30 UTC-3

Caracas (Venezuela)	0–0	(Chile) Everton

Estádio Urbano Caldeira, Santos

October 6, 2009
13:00 UTC-3

White Star (Peru)	1–4	(Chile) Everton
Wilcox 74' (pen.)		Arias 25', 56', 59', 88'

Estádio Urbano Caldeira, Santos
Referee: Norma Gonzales
October 6, 2009
15:00 UTC-3

Santos (Brazil)	12–0	(Bolivia) EnForma Santa Cruz
Cristiane 14', 43', 45+1', 64', 80'; Érika 23', 47', 62'; Maurine 34'; Marta 39' (pen.); Dani 70'; Thaís 74'

Estádio Urbano Caldeira, Santos
Attendance: 3,746
Referee: Salomé di Iorio

October 8, 2009
20:00 UTC-3

White Star (Peru)	1–0	(Venezuela) Caracas
McCloskey 84'

Estádio Urbano Caldeira, Santos
Referee: Alejandra Maria Trucidos
October 8, 2009
16:00 UTC-3

Everton (Chile)	5–0	(Bolivia) EnForma Santa Cruz
Arias 58', 84', 90'; López 82'; Díaz 88'

Estádio Urbano Caldeira, Santos
Referee: Eveliny Almeida

October 10, 2009
20:00 UTC-3

EnForma Santa Cruz (Bolivia)	2–4	(Peru) White Star
Zamorano 20'; A. Velasco 37'		Gálvez 27'; McCloskey 33'; Wilcox 35', 85'

Estádio Urbano Caldeira, Santos
October 10, 2009
22:00 UTC-3

Santos (Brazil)	11–0	(Venezuela) Caracas
Cristiane 10', 18', 19', 64', 82'; Érika 12'; Marta 16', 87'; Maurine 42'; Fran 52', 71'

Estádio Urbano Caldeira, Santos

October 13, 2009
13:30 UTC-3

Caracas (Venezuela)	2–2	(Bolivia) EnForma Santa Cruz
González 38'; Altuve 55'		Padilla 8'; Rivero 14'

Estádio Urbano Caldeira, Santos
October 13, 2009
15:30 UTC-3

Santos (Brazil)	3–1	(Chile) Everton
Cristiane 11'; Suzana 15'; Marta 48' (pen.)		Morales 36'

Estádio Urbano Caldeira, Santos

=== Group 2 ===
Group 2 matches were played at Estádio Municipal Antônio Fernandes (Guarujá), Estádio Ulrico Mursa (Santos) and Estádio Urbano Caldeira (Santos).

Team	Pld	W	D	L	GF	GA	GD	Pts
(Paraguay) Universidad Autónoma	4	4	0	0	15	6	+9	12
(Colombia) Formas Íntimas	4	3	0	1	18	5	+13	9
(Ecuador) Deportivo Quito	4	1	1	2	7	10	−3	4
(Argentina) San Lorenzo	4	1	1	2	7	13	−6	4
(Uruguay) Rampla Juniors	4	0	0	4	5	18	−13	0

October 5, 2009
13:30 UTC-3

Universidad Autónoma (Paraguay)	3–2	(Colombia) Formas Íntimas
Vega 30', 75' (pen.), 78'		Ospina 15'; Usme 63'

Estádio Antonio Fernandes, Guarujá
October 5, 2009
15:30 UTC-3

San Lorenzo (Argentina)	1–1	(Ecuador) Deportivo Quito
Quiñones 80'		Riera 43'

Estádio Antonio Fernandes, Guarujá

October 7, 2009
13:30 UTC-3

Deportivo Quito (Ecuador)	1–5	(Colombia) Formas Íntimas
Palacios 65'		Ospina 20'; Imbachí 28'; Peñaloza 47'; Usme 58'; Cuesta 90'

Estádio Antonio Fernandes, Guarujá
October 7, 2009
15:30 UTC-3

Rampla Juniors (Uruguay)	2–5	(Argentina) San Lorenzo
Castro 66'; Laborda 68'		Tato 41', 55'; Quiñones 61'; Núñez 69'; Ramírez 87'

Estádio Antonio Fernandes, Guarujá

October 10, 2009
14:00 UTC-3

Deportivo Quito (Ecuador)	1–4	(Paraguay) Universidad Autónoma
Freire 1'		Vázquez 38'; Quintana 70'; A. Rodríguez 87'; N. Cuevas 90'

Estádio Antonio Fernandes, Guarujá
October 10, 2009
16:00 UTC-3

Formas Íntimas (Colombia)	5–0	(Uruguay) Rampla Juniors
Ospina 5'; Peñaloza 9', 10'; Usme 22', 90' (pen.)

Estádio Antonio Fernandes, Guarujá

October 12, 2009
13:30 UTC-3

Rampla Juniors (Uruguay)	0–4	(Ecuador) Deportivo Quito
		Riera 4'; Freire 58'; Palacios 79' (pen.); Torres 90+1'

Estádio Ulrico Mursa, Santos
October 12, 2009
15:30 UTC-3

Universidad Autónoma (Paraguay)	4–0	(Argentina) San Lorenzo
Cabrera 25'; Quintana 66'; A. Rodríguez 86'; Villamayor 89'

Estádio Ulrico Mursa, Santos

October 14, 2009
9:00 UTC-3

Universidad Autónoma (Paraguay)	4–3	(Uruguay) Rampla Juniors
I. Cuevas 36', 43', 90+2'; A. Rodríguez 51'		Castro 18'; Moreno 52', 84'

Estádio Urbano Caldeira, Santos
October 14, 2009
11:00 UTC-3

San Lorenzo (Argentina)	1–6	(Colombia) Formas Íntimas
Quintero 74' (o.g.)		Ospina 5', 55'; Usme 16', 77'; Imbachí 46'; Peñaloza 83'

Estádio Urbano Caldeira, Santos

== Knockout stage ==
Semi-finals
October 16
(Brazil) Santos	5
(Colombia) Formas Íntimas	0
October 16
(Paraguay) Universidad Autónoma	1
(Chile) Everton	0

Final
October 18
(Brazil) Santos	9
(Paraguay) Universidad Autónoma	0
Third place
October 18
(Colombia) Formas Íntimas	2
(Chile) Everton	0

=== Semifinals ===
October 16, 2009
20:00 UTC-3

Universidad Autónoma (Paraguay)	1–0	(Chile) Everton
Villamayor 44'

Estádio do Pacaembu, São Paulo

October 16, 2009
22:15 UTC-3

Santos (Brazil)	5–0	(Colombia) Formas Íntimas
Maurine 5'; Cristiane 11', 88'; Aline Pellegrino 23'; Marta 45'

Estádio do Pacaembu, São Paulo

=== Third-place match ===
October 18, 2009
9:30 UTC-3

Formas Íntimas (Colombia)	2–0	(Chile) Everton
Peñaloza 5'; Usme 57'

Estádio Urbano Caldeira, Santos

=== Final ===
October 18, 2009
12:30 UTC-3

Santos (Brazil)	9–0	(Paraguay) Universidad Autónoma
Maurine 13'; Marta 16'; Érika 46', 56'; Fran 49'; Thaís 53'; Suzana 70'; Dani 77'; Ketlen 83'	Report; Video report

Estádio Urbano Caldeira, Santos
Referee: Salomé di Iorio (Argentina)

Santos	Universidad Autónoma

GK	77	(Brazil) Andréia Suntaque
DF	5	(Brazil) Aline Pellegrino (c)	Substituted off
DF	23	(Brazil) Carol Arruda
DF	18	(Brazil) Janaína
DF	3	(Brazil) Dani
MF	15	(Brazil) Ester
MF	80	(Brazil) Fran
MF	99	(Brazil) Maurine
MF	10	(Brazil) Marta
FW	90	(Brazil) Érika	Substituted off
FW	40	(Brazil) Thais	Substituted off
Substitutes:
MF	9	(Brazil) Suzana	Substituted on
FW	17	(Brazil) Ketlen	Substituted on
FW	7	(Brazil) Pikena	Substituted on
Manager:
(Brazil) Kleiton Lima

GK	12	Gloria Rodriguez
DF	14	(Paraguay) Angélica Vázquez
DF	3	(Paraguay) Carmen Benítez
DF	20	(Paraguay) Jessica Santacruz
DF	4	Ediberta Jacquet
MF	7	(Paraguay) Joana Galeano
MF	6	(Paraguay) Hilda Riveros
MF	18	(Paraguay) Noelia Cuevas
MF	10	Monica Karina
FW	16	(Paraguay) Dulce María Quintana
FW	17	Gloria Esther
Substitutes:
		Francisca Pereira		Substituted on
		Silvia Cristina	Booked	Substituted on
		Anabel Rodriguez		Substituted on
Manager:
Castor Vera

Copa Libertadores de Fútbol Femenino
2009 Champion

Santos
First Title

== Top goalscorers ==
Rank	Player	Team	Goals
1	(Brazil) Cristiane	(Brazil) Santos	15
2	(Chile) Valeska Arias	(Chile) Everton	7
2	(Brazil) Marta	(Brazil) Santos	7
2	(Colombia) Catalina Usme	(Colombia) Formas Íntimas	7
5	(Brazil) Érika	(Brazil) Santos	6
6	(Colombia) Diana Ospina	(Colombia) Formas Íntimas	5
6	(Colombia) Jennifer Peñaloza	(Colombia) Formas Íntimas	5
8	(Brazil) Maurine	(Brazil) Santos	4
8	(United States) Nicole Wilcox	(Peru) White Star	4
10	(Paraguay) Irma Cuevas	(Paraguay) Universidad Autónoma	3
10	(Brazil) Fran	(Brazil) Santos	3
10	(Paraguay) Anabel Rodríguez	(Paraguay) Universidad Autónoma	3
10	(Paraguay) Karina Vega	(Paraguay) Universidad Autónoma	3
