= Peruvian football clubs in international competitions =

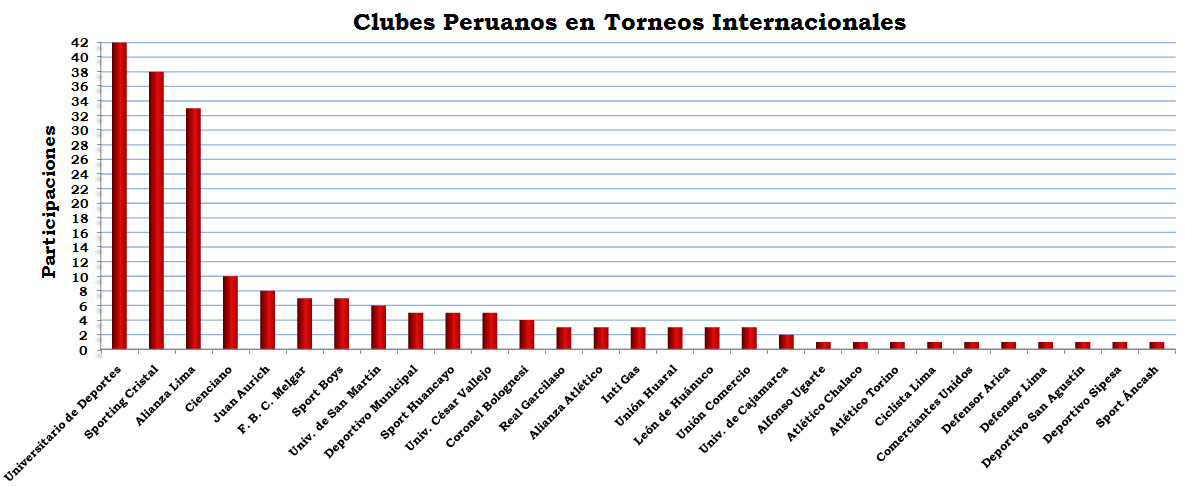
Peruvian football clubs in international competitions.

The participation of the Peruvian football clubs in official international tournaments in the competitions organized by the CONMEBOL began in 1948 with the participation of the Deportivo Municipal in the Campeonato Sudamericano de Campeones, trophy recognized in 1996 as the first cup organized by the CONMEBOL. After this contest, the dispute of the official international tournaments was interrupted until 1960, when the South American teams began to participate in the Copa Libertadores.

Sporting Cristal and Universitario are the Peruvian clubs that more international cups disputed, with 50 participations, followed by Alianza Lima (42), Melgar (18), Cienciano (13), Sport Huancayo (11) and Universidad César Vallejo (9).

== Men's football ==
=== Defunct tournaments ===
==== Campeonato Sudamericano de Campeones (1948) ====
The Copa de Campeones (Portuguese: Campeonato Sul-americano de Clubes Campeões) was a football competition played in 1948. It was played between 11 February and 17 March by clubs from Argentina, Bolivia, Brazil, Chile, Ecuador, Peru, and Uruguay.

Season	Clubs	Place	Ref.
1948	Deportivo Municipal	Fourth Place	

==== Recopa Sudamericana de Clubes (1970–1971) ====
The Copa Ganadores de Copa, also known as Recopa Sudamericana de Clubes, was a now defunct official South American football tournament organized by CONMEBOL. Its first edition was held in 1970 and was won by Bolivian club Mariscal Santa Cruz. The second edition was organized in 1971, however, Group One matches have never been played and the tournament reduced to a friendly competition at the end and the winner of Group Two was crowned the champion. The competition was not held after this year.

Season	Clubs	Place
1970	Deportivo Municipal	First Stage
1971	Juan Aurich	First Stage

==== Copa CONMEBOL (1992–1999) ====
The Copa CONMEBOL (CONMEBOL Cup) was an annual football tournament played between 1992 and 1999. It was the South American equivalent of the European UEFA Cup. It replaced the Supercopa Sudamericana which featured past Copa Libertadores champions. Teams that were not able to qualify for the Copa Libertadores played in this tournament. The tournament was played as a knockout cup. Six of the eight editions were played with sixteen teams whilst one was played with eighteen, featuring a preliminary round, and another with fourteen teams.

Season	Clubs	Place	Ref.
1992	Universitario de Deportes	Round of 16	
1993	Deportivo Sipesa	Quarterfinals	
1994	Sporting Cristal	Quarterfinals	
1995	Ciclista Lima	Round of 16	
1996	Alianza Lima	Round of 16	
1997	Universitario de Deportes	Semifinals	
1998	Melgar	Round of 16	
1999	Sport Boys	Quarterfinals	

==== Copa Merconorte (1998–2001) ====
The Copa Merconorte was an international football competition played from 1998 to 2001 by clubs from Venezuela, Colombia, Ecuador, Peru, Bolivia, and later the United States, Costa Rica and Mexico. The name was a counterpart to the Copa Mercosur, which was based on the actual Mercosur economic pact between Brazil, Argentina, Paraguay, Uruguay and Chile (no Merconorte trade bloc actually exists). It was superseded by the Copa Sudamericana in 2002.

Season	Clubs	Place	Ref.
1998	Alianza Lima; Sporting Cristal; Universitario de Deportes	First Stage; First Stage; First Stage	
1999	Alianza Lima; Sporting Cristal; Universitario de Deportes	Semifinals; First Stage; First Stage	
2000	Alianza Lima; Sporting Cristal; Universitario de Deportes	First Stage; First Stage; First Stage	
2001	Alianza Lima; Sporting Cristal; Universitario de Deportes	First Stage; First Stage; First Stage	

=== Current Tournaments ===
==== Copa Libertadores de América (1960–) ====
The Copa Libertadores de América, officially the Copa Santander Libertadores de América for sponsorship reasons, is an annual international club football competition organized by CONMEBOL since 1960. It is the most prestigious club competition in South American football. Despite being a South American competition, Mexican teams have been invited since 1998. The name of the tournament is an homage to the Libertadores (Portuguese and Spanish for freedom fighters), the main leaders of the independence wars of South America.

Season	Clubs	Place	Ref.
1961	Universitario de Deportes	First Stage	
1962	Sporting Cristal	Group Stage	
1963	Alianza Lima	Group Stage	
1964	Alianza Lima	Group Stage	
1965	Universitario de Deportes	Group Stage	
1966	Alianza Lima; Universitario de Deportes	Group Stage; Group Stage	
1967	Sport Boys; Universitario de Deportes	Group Stage; Semifinals	
1968	Sporting Cristal; Universitario de Deportes	Quarterfinals; Quarterfinals	
1969	Juan Aurich; Sporting Cristal	Group Stage; Group Stage	
1970	Defensor Arica; Universitario de Deportes	Group Stage; Quarterfinals	
1971	Sporting Cristal; Universitario de Deportes	Group Stage; Semifinals	
1972	Alianza Lima; Universitario de Deportes	Group Stage; Runner-up	
1973	Sporting Cristal; Universitario de Deportes	Group Stage; Group Stage	
1974	Defensor Lima; Sporting Cristal	Semifinals; Group Stage	
1975	Unión Huaral; Universitario de Deportes	Group Stage; Semifinals	
1976	Alianza Lima; Alfonso Ugarte	Semifinals; Group Stage	
1977	Sport Boys; Unión Huaral	Group Stage; Group Stage	
1978	Alianza Lima; Sporting Cristal	Semifinals; Group Stage	
1979	Alianza Lima; Universitario de Deportes	Group Stage; Group Stage	
1980	Atlético Chalaco; Sporting Cristal	Group Stage; Group Stage	
1981	Atlético Torino; Sporting Cristal	Group Stage; Group Stage	
1982	Deportivo Municipal; Melgar	Group Stage; Group Stage	
1983	Alianza Lima; Universitario de Deportes	Group Stage; Group Stage	
1984	Melgar; Sporting Cristal	Group Stage; Group Stage	
1985	Sport Boys; Universitario de Deportes	Group Stage; Group Stage	
1986	Universitario de Deportes; UTC	Group Stage; Group Stage	
1987	Alianza Lima; San Agustín	Group Stage; Group Stage	
1988	Alianza Lima; Universitario de Deportes	Group Stage; Second Stage	
1989	Sporting Cristal; Universitario de Deportes	Group Stage; Round of 16	
1990	Sporting Cristal; Unión Huaral	Group Stage; Round of 16	
1991	Sport Boys; Universitario de Deportes	Group Stage; Round of 16	
1992	Sport Boys; Sporting Cristal	Group Stage; Round of 16	
1993	Sporting Cristal; Universitario de Deportes	Quarterfinals; Round of 16	
1994	Alianza Lima; Universitario de Deportes	Group Stage; Round of 16	
1995	Alianza Lima; Sporting Cristal	Round of 16; Quarterfinals	
1996	Sporting Cristal; Universitario de Deportes	Round of 16; Group Stage	
1997	Alianza Lima; Sporting Cristal	Group Stage; Runner-up	
1998	Alianza Lima; Sporting Cristal	Round of 16; Group Stage	
1999	Sporting Cristal; Universitario de Deportes	Group Stage; Round of 16	
2000	Alianza Lima; Sporting Cristal; Universitario de Deportes	Group Stage; Group Stage; Group Stage	
2001	Sport Boys; Sporting Cristal; Universitario de Deportes	Group Stage; Group Stage; Group Stage	
2002	Alianza Lima; Cienciano; Sporting Cristal	Group Stage; Round of 16; Group Stage	
2003	Alianza Lima; Sporting Cristal; Universitario de Deportes	Group Stage; Group Stage; Group Stage	
2004	Alianza Lima; Cienciano; Sporting Cristal	Group Stage; Group Stage; Round of 16	
2005	Alianza Lima; Cienciano; Sporting Cristal	Group Stage; First Stage; Group Stage	
2006	Cienciano; Sporting Cristal; Universitario de Deportes	Group Stage; Group Stage; Group Stage	
2007	Alianza Lima; Cienciano; Sporting Cristal	Group Stage; Group Stage; First Stage	
2008	Cienciano; Coronel Bolognesi; Universidad San Martín	Group Stage; Group Stage; Group Stage	
2009	Sporting Cristal; Universidad San Martín; Universitario de Deportes	First Stage; Round of 16; Group Stage	
2010	Alianza Lima; Juan Aurich; Universitario de Deportes	Round of 16; Group Stage; Round of 16	
2011	Alianza Lima; León de Huánuco; Universidad San Martín	First Stage; Group Stage; Group Stage	
2012	Alianza Lima; Juan Aurich; Sport Huancayo	Group Stage; Group Stage; First Stage	
2013	Real Garcilaso; Sporting Cristal; Universidad César Vallejo	Quarterfinals; Group Stage; First Stage	
2014	Real Garcilaso; Sporting Cristal; Universitario de Deportes	Group Stage; First Stage; Group Stage	
2015	Alianza Lima; Juan Aurich; Sporting Cristal	First Stage; Group Stage; Group Stage	
2016	Melgar; Sporting Cristal; Universidad César Vallejo	Group Stage; Group Stage; First Stage	
2017	Melgar; Deportivo Municipal; Sporting Cristal; Universitario de Deportes	Group Stage; First Stage; Group Stage; Second Stage	
2018	Alianza Lima; Melgar; Real Garcilaso; Universitario de Deportes	Group Stage; Second Stage; Group Stage; First Stage	
2019	Alianza Lima; Melgar; Real Garcilaso; Sporting Cristal	Group Stage; Group Stage; First Stage; Group Stage	
2020	Alianza Lima; Binacional; Sporting Cristal; Universitario de Deportes	Group Stage; Group Stage; Second Stage; Second Stage	
2021	Ayacucho; Sporting Cristal; Universidad César Vallejo; Universitario de Deportes	Second Stage; Group Stage; First Stage; Group Stage	
2022	Alianza Lima; Sporting Cristal; Universidad César Vallejo; Universitario de Deportes	Group Stage; Group Stage; First Stage; Second Stage	
2023	Alianza Lima; Sport Huancayo; Melgar; Sporting Cristal	Group Stage; First Stage; Group Stage; Group Stage	
2024	Alianza Lima; Melgar; Sporting Cristal; Universitario de Deportes	Group Stage; First Stage; Second Stage; Group Stage	
2025	Alianza Lima; Melgar; Sporting Cristal; Universitario de Deportes	Group Stage; Third Stage; Group Stage; Round of 16	
2026	Alianza Lima; Cusco; Sporting Cristal; Universitario de Deportes	First Stage; Group Stage; Group Stage; Group Stage	
2027	Alianza Lima; Melgar; Sport Huancayo; Universitario de Deportes		

==== Recopa Sudamericana (1989–) ====
The Recopa Sudamericana (South American Winners' Cup, Recopa, or Cup Winners' Cup; Portuguese: Recopa Sul-Americana) is an annual football match-up between the reigning champions of the previous year's Copa Libertadores and the Copa Sudamericana. It is analogous to its European counterpart, the UEFA Super Cup.

Season	Clubs	Place	Ref.
2004	Cienciano	Champion	

==== Copa Sudamericana (2002–) ====
The Copa Sudamericana, officially Copa Sudamericana de Clubes, also known as Copa Nissan Sudamericana for sponsorship reasons, is an annual international club football competition organized by CONMEBOL since 2002. It is the second most important competition in South American club football. Despite being an organized by CONMEBOL, they invited Mexican teams between 2005 and 2008. It can be said that the Copa Sudamericana is an equivalent of sorts to the now-defunct Copa Conmebol.

Season	Clubs	Place	Ref.
2002	Alianza Lima; Universitario de Deportes	Quarterfinals; First Stage	
2003	Alianza Lima; Cienciano	First Stage; Champion	
2004	Alianza Atlético; Cienciano; Coronel Bolognesi	Round of 16; Round of 16; First Stage	
2005	Alianza Atlético; Universitario de Deportes	First Stage; First Stage	
2006	Coronel Bolognesi; Universidad San Martín	First Stage; First Stage	
2007	Coronel Bolognesi; Universitario de Deportes	First Stage; First Stage	
2008	Sport Ancash; Universitario de Deportes	Round of 16; First Stage	
2009	Alianza Atlético; Cienciano	Round of 16; Round of 16	
2010	Sport Huancayo; Universidad San Martín; Universidad César Vallejo	Second Stage; Second Stage; First Stage	
2011	Juan Aurich; Universidad César Vallejo; Universitario de Deportes	First Stage; First Stage; Quarterfinals	
2012	Inti Gas; León de Huánuco; Unión Comercio; Universidad San Martín	First Stage; First Stage; First Stage; First Stage	
2013	Inti Gas; Juan Aurich; Melgar; Sport Huancayo	First Stage; First Stage; First Stage; First Stage	
2014	Alianza Lima; Inti Gas; Universidad César Vallejo; UTC	First Stage; First Stage; Quarterfinals; First Stage	
2015	León de Huánuco; Melgar; Unión Comercio; Universitario de Deportes	First Stage; First Stage; First Stage; Second Stage	
2016	Deportivo Municipal; Real Garcilaso; Sport Huancayo; Universitario de Deportes	First Stage; Second Stage; Second Stage; First Stage	
2017	Alianza Lima; Comerciantes Unidos; Juan Aurich; Sport Huancayo	First Stage; First Stage; First Stage; First Stage	
2018	Sport Huancayo; Sport Rosario; Sporting Cristal; UTC	Second Stage; First Stage; First Stage; First Stage	
2019	Binacional; Deportivo Municipal; Melgar; Sport Huancayo; Sporting Cristal; UTC	First Stage; First Stage; Second Stage; First Stage; Round of 16; First Stage	
2020	Atlético Grau; Cusco; Melgar; Sport Huancayo	First Stage; First Stage; Second Stage; Round of 16	
2021	Carlos A. Mannucci; Melgar; Sport Huancayo; Sporting Cristal; UTC	First Stage; Group Stage; Group Stage; Quarterfinals; First Stage	
2022	Ayacucho; Cienciano; Melgar; Sport Boys	Group Stage; First Stage; Semifinals; First Stage	
2023	Binacional; Cienciano; Sporting Cristal; Universidad César Vallejo; Universitario de Deportes	First Stage; First Stage; Knockout round play-offs Group Stage; Knockout round play-offs	
2024	ADT; Deportivo Garcilaso; Sport Huancayo; Universidad César Vallejo	First Stage; Group Stage; First Stage; Group Stage	
2025	ADT; Alianza Lima; Atlético Grau; Cienciano; Cusco; Melgar	First Stage; Quarterfinals; Group Stage; Round of 16; First Stage; Group Stage	
2026	Alianza Atlético; Cienciano; Deportivo Garcilaso; Melgar; Sporting Cristal	Group Stage; Quarterfinals; First Stage; First Stage; Knockout round play-offs	
2027	Cienciano; Cusco; Deportivo Garcilaso; Sporting Cristal		

=== Total International Participations by club ===
As of 22 November 2026

Club	Total	International Participations						
Club	Total	Copa Libertadores (1961–)	Copa Sudamericana (2003–)	Recopa Sudamericana (1970–)	Copa CONMEBOL (1992–1999)	Copa Merconorte (1998–2001)	Copa de Campeones (1948)	Copa Ganadores de Copa (1970–1971)
Sporting Cristal	52	41	6	0	1	4	—	—
Universitario de Deportes	51	37	8	0	2	4	—	—
Alianza Lima	43	33	5	0	1	4	—	—
Melgar	19	10	8	0	1	—	—	—
Cienciano	15	6	8	1	—	—	—	—
Sport Huancayo	12	3	9	0	—	—	—	—
Cusco	9	5	4	0	—	—	—	—
Universidad César Vallejo	9	4	5	0	—	—	—	—
Sport Boys	8	6	1	0	1	—	—	—
Juan Aurich	8	4	3	0	—	—	—	1
Universidad San Martín	6	3	3	0	—	—	—	—
Deportivo Municipal	6	2	2	0	—	—	1	1
Ayacucho	5	1	4	0	—	—	—	—
UTC	5	1	4	0	—	—	—	—
Coronel Bolognesi	4	1	3	0	—	—	—	—
Alianza Atlético	4	0	4	0	—	—	—	—
Unión Huaral	3	3	0	0	—	—	—	—
Binacional	3	1	2	0	—	—	—	—
León de Huánuco	3	1	2	0	—	—	—	—
Deportivo Garcilaso	3	0	3	0	—	—	—	—
ADT	2	0	2	0	—	—	—	—
Atlético Grau	2	0	2	0	—	—	—	—
Unión Comercio	2	0	2	0	—	—	—	—
Alfonso Ugarte	1	1	0	0	—	—	—	—
Atlético Chalaco	1	1	0	0	—	—	—	—
Defensor Arica	1	1	0	0	—	—	—	—
Defensor Lima	1	1	0	0	—	—	—	—
San Agustín	1	1	0	0	—	—	—	—
Atlético Torino	1	1	0	0	—	—	—	—
Carlos A. Mannucci	1	0	1	0	—	—	—	—
Comerciantes Unidos	1	0	1	0	—	—	—	—
Sport Ancash	1	0	1	0	—	—	—	—
Sport Rosario	1	0	1	0	—	—	—	—
Ciclista Lima	1	0	0	0	1	—	—	—
Deportivo Sipesa	1	0	0	0	1	—	—	—

== Youth ==
=== Current Tournaments ===
==== U-20 Copa Libertadores (2011–present) ====
Season	Clubs	Place	Ref.
2011	Alianza Lima; Universitario de Deportes	Fourth Place; Champion	
2012	Alianza Lima; Sporting Cristal; Universitario de Deportes	Quarterfinals; Group Stage; Quarterfinals	
2016	Melgar	Group Stage	
2018	Sport Huancayo	Group Stage	
2020	Sporting Cristal	Group Stage	
2022	Sporting Cristal	Group Stage	
2023	Alianza Lima	Group Stage	
2024	Sporting Cristal	Group Stage	
2025	Universitario de Deportes	Group Stage	
2026	Sporting Cristal	Group Stage	

=== Total International Participations by club ===
As of 20 December 2025

Club	Total	International Participations
Club	Total	U-20 Copa Libertadores (2011–)
Sporting Cristal	5	5
Alianza Lima	3	3
Universitario de Deportes	3	3
Melgar	1	1
Sport Huancayo	1	1

== Women's football ==
=== Current Tournaments ===
==== Copa Libertadores Femenina (2009–present) ====
Season	Clubs	Place	Ref.
2009	White Star	Group Stage	
2010	Universidad Particular de Iquitos	Group Stage	
2011	JC Sport Girls	Group Stage	
2012	JC Sport Girls	Group Stage	
2013	JC Sport Girls	Group Stage	
2014	Real Maracaná	Group Stage	
2015	Universitario de Deportes	Group Stage	
2016	Universitario de Deportes	Group Stage	
2017	Universitario de Deportes	Group Stage	
2018	JC Sport Girls	Group Stage	
2019	Municipalidad de Majes	Group Stage	
2020	Universitario de Deportes	Group Stage	
2021	Alianza Lima	Quarterfinals	
2022	Alianza Lima	Group Stage	
2023	Universitario de Deportes	Group Stage	
2024	Alianza Lima	Quarterfinals	
2025	Alianza Lima	Group Stage	
2026	Universitario de Deportes	Group Stage	

=== Total International Participations by club ===
As of 19 October 2026

Club	Total	International Participations
Club	Total	Copa Libertadores Femenina (2009–)
Universitario de Deportes	6	6
Alianza Lima	4	4
JC Sport Girls	4	4
Municipalidad de Majes	1	1
Real Maracaná	1	1
Universidad Particular de Iquitos	1	1
White Star	1	1
