= 2011 Copa Libertadores Femenina =

2011 Copa Libertadores de Fútbol Femenina
Tournament details
- Host country: Brazil
- Dates: 13–27 November 2011
- Teams: 12 (from 10 associations)
- Venues: 2 (in 1 host city)

Final positions
- Champions: (Brazil) São José (1st title)
- Runners-up: (Chile) Colo Colo
- Third place: (Brazil) Santos
- Fourth place: (Venezuela) Caracas

Tournament statistics
- Matches played: 22
- Goals scored: 94 (4.27 per match)
- Top scorer: (Venezuela) Ysaura Viso (9 goals)

The 2011 Copa Libertadores de Fútbol Femenino was the third edition of the Copa Libertadores de Fútbol Femenino, CONMEBOL's premier annual international women's football club tournament. It was again held in Brazil from 13 to 27 November 2011. Santos were the defending champions.

The competition was won by the local team São José for the first time. Two-time champion Santos finished in third place. Caracas' Ysaura Viso won the top-scorer award, having scored nine goals in her team's five matches.

== Changes from 2010 ==
- The tournament was expanded from 10 to 12 teams. This allowed for Santos to enter and be able to defend their title. As well as a local team from the host city to join the competing teams.

== Format ==
The twelve teams are divided in three groups of four. The teams then play each other once. After that the group winners and the best runner-up qualify for the semi-finals. Those as well as the final are single-legged, i.e. no home and away matches.

== Qualified teams ==
There have been talks to expand the competition to 12 teams, give one spot to title holders Santos and one spot to the Japanese 2011 L. League champion. Ultimately it was decided to give the twelfth spot to a local team of the host city.

Association	Team	Qualifying method
Argentina	Boca Juniors	2010–11 Clausura and Apertura champions
Bolivia	Gerimex	2011 Bolivian League champion
Brazil	CEPE-Caxias	2010 Copa do Brasil de Futebol Feminino champion
Brazil	Santos	Title holder
Brazil	São José	Host city team
Chile	Colo Colo	2010 Chilean League champion
Colombia	Formas Íntimas	won play-off match (no national league)
Ecuador	LDU Quito	2010 Copa Credifé femenina champion
Paraguay	Universidad Autónoma	2010 Paraguayan League champion
Peru	JC Sport Girls	2010 Campeonato Nacional de Fútbol Femenino champion
Uruguay	Nacional	2010 Campeonato Uruguayo Femenino champion
Venezuela	Caracas	2011 Venezuelan League champions

Each team was allowed to nominate 20 players for the tournament.

== First stage ==
The group winner and the best runners-up advanced to the semifinals. The draw and fixtures were announced on 1 November 2011.

Key to colors in group tables
Group winners and runners-up advanced to the semi-finals

Tie-breaker in case of equal points is:

1. Goal difference
2. Goals scored
3. Match between tied teams

If still tied the organisers may decide how to proceed. In case two team are tied after having played each other the last matchday, the tie is decided by a penalty shootout.

=== Group A ===
Team	Pld	W	D	L	GF	GA	GD	Pts
(Chile) Colo Colo	3	2	1	0	9	3	+6	7
(Paraguay) Universidad Autónoma	3	1	2	0	7	3	+4	5
(Brazil) CEPE-Caxias	3	1	1	1	5	2	+3	4
(Peru) JC Sport Girls	3	0	0	3	1	14	−13	0

13 November 2011
10:00 UTC−02:00

Universidad Autónoma (Paraguay)	2–2	(Chile) Colo Colo
N. Cuevas 46'; Quintana 78'	Report	Santibáñez 32'; Quezada 50' (pen.)

Estádio ADC Parahyba, São José dos Campos
Attendance: 100
13 November 2011
12:15 UTC−02:00

CEPE-Caxias (Brazil)	4–0	(Peru) JC Sport Girls
Néia 5'; Camila 42'; Bárbara 59'; Daianny 83'	Report

Estádio ADC Parahyba, São José dos Campos
Attendance: 50

16 November 2011
15:45 UTC−02:00

CEPE-Caxias (Brazil)	0–0	(Paraguay) Universidad Autónoma
	Report

Estádio ADC Parahyba, São José dos Campos
Attendance: 300
16 November 2011
18:00 UTC−02:00

JC Sport Girls (Peru)	0–5	(Chile) Colo Colo
	Report	Banini 32'; Quezada 55'; Araya 61', 80'; Santibáñez 72'

Estádio ADC Parahyba, São José dos Campos
Attendance: 250

19 November 2011
10:00 UTC−02:00

CEPE-Caxias (Brazil)	1–2	(Chile) Colo Colo
Bárbara 45'	Report	Quezada 30'; Araya 75' (pen.)

Estádio ADC Parahyba, São José dos Campos
Attendance: 90
19 November 2011
12:15 UTC−02:00

Universidad Autónoma (Paraguay)	5–1	(Peru) JC Sport Girls
Riveros 22', 24'; Quintana 28'; Larrea 64', 87'	Report	Grandez 36'

Estádio ADC Parahyba, São José dos Campos
Attendance: 60

=== Group B ===
Team	Pld	W	D	L	GF	GA	GD	Pts
(Brazil) Santos	3	3	0	0	15	2	+13	9
(Venezuela) Caracas	3	2	0	1	13	4	+9	6
(Bolivia) Gerimex	3	0	1	2	1	11	−10	1
(Uruguay) Nacional	3	0	1	2	1	13	−12	1

14 November 2011
16:45 UTC−02:00

Nacional (Uruguay)	1–1	(Bolivia) Gerimex
Yun 53'	Report	Loayza 49'

Estádio Martins Pereira, São José dos Campos
Attendance: 50
14 November 2011
19:00 UTC−02:00

Santos (Brazil)	4–2	(Venezuela) Caracas
Chú 2', 28'; Glaucia 46'; Esterzinha 78'	Report	Viso 32', 74'

Estádio Martins Pereira, São José dos Campos
Attendance: 300

17 November 2011
13:30 UTC−02:00

Nacional (Uruguay)	0–5	(Venezuela) Caracas
	Report	Viso 5', 28', 30'; Ascanio 53'; Basanta 70'

Estádio Martins Pereira, São José dos Campos
Attendance: 50
17 November 2011
16:00 UTC−02:00

Santos (Brazil)	4–0	(Bolivia) Gerimex
Érika 28'; Karen 62'; Dani 70'; Gabi 85'	Report

Estádio Martins Pereira, São José dos Campos
Attendance: 400

20 November 2011
18:45 UTC−02:00

Gerimex (Bolivia)	0–6	(Venezuela) Caracas
	Report	Viso 5', 77', 84'; Bandrés 11'; Ascanio 21'; Flores 24'

Estádio Martins Pereira, São José dos Campos
Attendance: 70
20 November 2011
21:00 UTC−02:00

Nacional (Uruguay)	0–7	(Brazil) Santos
	Report	Glaucia 3', 72'; Angélica 29'; Karen 36', 76'; Érika 39', 57'

Estádio Martins Pereira, São José dos Campos
Attendance: 600

=== Group C ===
Team	Pld	W	D	L	GF	GA	GD	Pts
(Brazil) São José	3	2	1	0	7	4	+3	7
(Colombia) Formas Íntimas	3	1	1	1	9	9	0	4
(Argentina) Boca Juniors	3	1	0	2	6	6	0	3
(Ecuador) LDU Quito	3	1	0	2	5	8	−3	3

15 November 2011
15:45 UTC−02:00

São José (Brazil)	2–0	(Ecuador) LDU Quito
Daniele Milho 9', 47'	Report

Estádio Martins Pereira, São José dos Campos
Attendance: 900
15 November 2011
18:00 UTC−02:00

Boca Juniors (Argentina)	2–3	(Colombia) Formas Íntimas
Santana 2'; Potassa 8'	Report	Andrade 33' (pen.); Rodallega 67'; Peñaloza 87'

Estádio Martins Pereira, São José dos Campos
Attendance: 500

18 November 2011
15:30 UTC−02:00

Formas Íntimas (Colombia)	2–3	(Ecuador) LDU Quito
Andrade 30'; Cuesta 52'	Report	Quinteros 4', 39', 45'

Estádio Martins Pereira, São José dos Campos
18 November 2011
18:00 UTC−02:00

Boca Juniors (Argentina)	0–1	(Brazil) São José
	Report	Poliana 60'

Estádio Martins Pereira, São José dos Campos
Attendance: 3,000

21 November 2011
15:30 UTC−02:00

Formas Íntimas (Colombia)	4–4	(Brazil) São José
Cuesta 64', 75'; Ospina 71'; Montoya 79'	Report	Daniele Milho 9', 39'; Poliana 33'; Rafaela 79'

Estádio Martins Pereira, São José dos Campos
21 November 2011
18:00 UTC−02:00

Boca Juniors (Argentina)	4–2	(Ecuador) LDU Quito
Ojeda 15', 21'; Potassa 47'; Brusca 72'	Report	Riera 65'; Moreira 90'

Estádio Martins Pereira, São José dos Campos

=== Ranking of second place-finishers ===
In the ranking of group runners-ups all matches do count towards the ranking. Caracas finished as best runners-up and advanced to the semi-finals.

Grp	Team	Pld	W	D	L	GF	GA	GD	Pts
B	(Venezuela) Caracas	3	2	0	1	13	4	+9	6
A	(Paraguay) Universidad Autónoma	3	1	2	0	7	3	+4	5
C	(Colombia) Formas Íntimas	3	1	1	1	9	9	0	4

== Final stages ==
Santos meets São José in the semi-finals. That is contrary to the initial regulations, as only on 14 November 2011, during the tournament, it was decided that if two teams from the same country make the semi-finals they would be paired in the semi-final so there would be no national final.

Semi-finals
24 November 2011
(Chile) Colo Colo	4
(Venezuela) Caracas	1
24 November 2011
(Brazil) Santos	1
(Brazil) São José	2

Final
27 November 2011
(Chile) Colo Colo	0
(Brazil) São José	1
Third place
27 November 2011
(Venezuela) Caracas	0
(Brazil) Santos	6

=== Semifinals ===
24 November 2011
16:00 UTC−02:00

Colo Colo (Chile)	4–1	(Venezuela) Caracas
Santibáñez 29', 32'; Aedo 46'; Rengel 71' (o.g.)	Report	Viso 16'

Estádio Martins Pereira, São José dos Campos
24 November 2011
18:30 UTC−02:00

Santos (Brazil)	1–2	(Brazil) São José
Érika 1'		Formiga 44'; Francielle 85'

Estádio Martins Pereira, São José dos Campos

=== Third-place match ===
27 November 2011
09:45 UTC−02:00

Caracas (Venezuela)	0–6	(Brazil) Santos
		Chú 25', 88'; Glaucia 27'; Gabi 63', 66' (pen.); Pereira 84'

Estádio Martins Pereira, São José dos Campos

=== Final ===
27 November 2011
12:00 UTC−02:00

Colo Colo (Chile)	0–1	(Brazil) São José
	Report	Poliana 51'

Estádio Martins Pereira, São José dos Campos
Attendance: 18,000
