= 2009 Campeonato Nacional de Fútbol Femenino (Perú) =

Campeonato Nacional de Fútbol Femenino
- Season: 2009
- Champions: Universidad Particular de Iquitos
- Copa Libertadores: Universidad Particular de Iquitos
- Top goalscorer: Emily Flores (12)

The 2009 Campeonato Nacional de Fútbol Femenino season, was an amateur women's football championship, developed, organized, and promoted by the Peruvian Football Federation (FPF), which granted the classification to the 2010 Copa Libertadores Femenina.

Universidad Particular de Iquitos won their first title after defeating Universidad San Antonio de Abad by a 5–0 score in the finals. As champions, Universidad Particular de Iquitos qualified for the 2010 Copa Libertadores Femenina.

== Regional Stage ==
Department	Team
Apurímac	Juventud Cienciano
Arequipa	White Star
Cajamarca	Nueva Generación
Cusco	UNSAAC
Huancavelica	Santa Rosa PNP
Huánuco	Sporting Cristal
La Libertad	Carlos Tenaud
La Libertad	Semillero La Coruña
Lambayeque	Fuerza Deportiva
Lima	JC Sport Girls
Lima	Real Maracaná
Loreto	Universidad Particular de Iquitos
Tumbes	Juventud Start

== National Stage ==
=== Grupo A ===
Pos	Team	Pld	W	D	L	GF	GA	GD	Pts	Qualification or relegation	TEN	STA	PNP
1	Carlos Tenaud	1	1	0	0	4	1	+3	3	Advance to Semifinals		4–1	
2	Juventud Star	2	1	0	1	4	4	0	3				3–0
3	Santa Rosa PNP	1	0	0	1	0	3	−3	0		—		

Rules for classification: 1) Points; 2) Goal difference; 3) Goals for; 4) Fair play points; 5) Drawing of lots.

=== Grupo B ===
Pos	Team	Pld	W	D	L	GF	GA	GD	Pts	Qualification or relegation	JCS	USA	GEN
1	JC Sport Girls	1	1	0	0	7	0	+7	3				7–0
2	UNSAAC	0	0	0	0	0	0	0	0	Advance to Semifinals	—		
3	Nueva Generación	1	0	0	1	0	7	−7	0			—	

Rules for classification: 1) Points; 2) Goal difference; 3) Goals for; 4) Fair play points; 5) Drawing of lots.

=== Grupo C ===
Pos	Team	Pld	W	D	L	GF	GA	GD	Pts	Qualification or relegation	COR	CIE	FUE
1	Semillero La Coruña	1	1	0	0	4	0	+4	3	Advance to Semifinals			4–0
2	Juventud Cienciano	1	0	1	0	2	2	0	1		—		
3	Fuerza Deportiva	2	0	1	1	2	6	−4	1			2–2	

Rules for classification: 1) Points; 2) Goal difference; 3) Goals for; 4) Fair play points; 5) Drawing of lots.

=== Grupo D ===
Pos	Team	Pld	W	D	L	GF	GA	GD	Pts	Qualification or relegation	UPI	WHI	REA	CRI
1	Universidad Particular de Iquitos	3	2	0	1	12	3	+9	6	Advance to Semifinals			1–0	10–0
2	White Star	3	2	0	1	7	2	+5	6		3–1			
3	Real Maracaná	3	2	0	1	4	2	+2	6			1–0		3–1
4	Sporting Cristal	3	0	0	3	1	17	−16	0			0–4		

Rules for classification: 1) Points; 2) Goal difference; 3) Goals for; 4) Fair play points; 5) Drawing of lots.

== Semifinals ==
4 April 2010	Carlos Tenaud	2–5	Universidad Particular de Iquitos	Estadio Mansiche, Trujillo

4 April 2010	UNSAAC	3–0	Semillero La Coruña	Estadio Mansiche, Trujillo

== Final ==
5 April 2010	Universidad Particular de Iquitos	5–0	UNSAAC	Estadio Mansiche, Trujillo
