= 2010 Campeonato Nacional de Fútbol Femenino (Perú) =

Campeonato Nacional de Fútbol Femenino
- Season: 2010
- Champions: JC Sport Girls
- Copa Libertadores: JC Sport Girls

The 2010 Campeonato Nacional de Fútbol Femenino season, was an amateur women's football championship, developed, organized, and promoted by the Peruvian Football Federation (FPF), which granted the classification to the 2011 Copa Libertadores Femenina.

JC Sport Girls won their third title after defeating River San Borja by a 2–1 score in the finals. As champions, JC Sport Girls qualified for the 2011 Copa Libertadores Femenina.

== Regional Stage ==
Department	Team
Arequipa	White Star
Ayacucho	Sport Club Berrocal
Huánuco	
Lima	JC Sport Girls
Lima	River San Borja
La Libertad	—
Lambayeque	Sport Unión
Lambayeque	L. Chongoyape
Loreto	Electro Oriente

== National stage ==
=== Grupo A ===
Pos	Team	Pld	W	D	L	GF	GA	GD	Pts	Qualification or relegation	SUN	BER	HUA
1	Sport Unión	0	0	0	0	0	0	0	0	Advance to Semifinals			—
2	Sport Club Berrocal	0	0	0	0	0	0	0	0		—		
3	Huánuco	0	0	0	0	0	0	0	0			—	

Rules for classification: 1) Points; 2) Goal difference; 3) Goals for; 4) Fair play points; 5) Drawing of lots.

=== Grupo B ===
Pos	Team	Pld	W	D	L	GF	GA	GD	Pts	Qualification or relegation	JCS	WHI	TRU
1	JC Sport Girls	2	2	0	0	6	0	+6	6	Advance to Semifinals			3–0
2	White Star	2	1	0	1	3	3	0	3		0–3		
3	Trujillo	2	0	0	2	0	6	−6	0			0–3	

Rules for classification: 1) Points; 2) Goal difference; 3) Goals for; 4) Fair play points; 5) Drawing of lots.

=== Grupo C ===
Pos	Team	Pld	W	D	L	GF	GA	GD	Pts	Qualification or relegation	RIV	ELE	CHO
1	River San Borja	0	0	0	0	0	0	0	0	Advance to Semifinals			20–0
2	Electro Oriente	0	0	0	0	0	0	0	0	Advance to Semifinals	2–7		
3	L. Chongoyape	0	0	0	0	0	0	0	0			—	

Rules for classification: 1) Points; 2) Goal difference; 3) Goals for; 4) Fair play points; 5) Drawing of lots.

== Final Stage ==
=== Semifinals ===
1 October 2011	River San Borja	3–1	Electro Oriente	Estadio Elías Aguirre, Chiclayo
14:00

1 October 2011	JC Sport Girls	5–0	Sport Unión	Estadio Elías Aguirre, Chiclayo
16:00	Fabiola Herrera; Inés Ticona 57'; Maria José Parró 62'

=== Final ===
2 October 2011	JC Sport Girls	2–1	River San Borja	Estadio Elías Aguirre, Chiclayo
09:00	Gladys Dorador 50' 67'		Myriam Tristán 59' (pen.)
