= Primera División Femenina (Peru) =

Liga Femenina
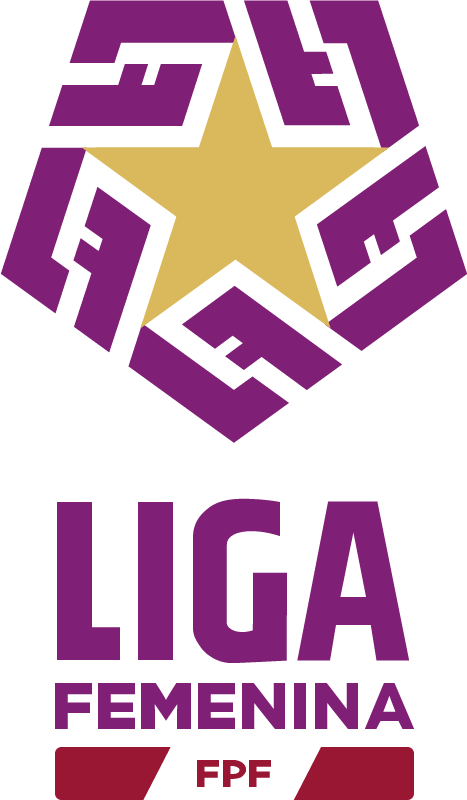
- Founded: 1996; 30 years ago
- Country: Peru
- Confederation: CONMEBOL
- Number of clubs: 12
- Level on pyramid: 1
- Relegation to: Liga de Ascenso Femenina
- International cup: Copa Libertadores Femenina
- Current champions: Universitario de Deportes (2026)
- Most championships: Universitario de Deportes (11 titles)
- Top scorer: Adriana Lúcar (107 goals)
- Broadcasters: L1 Max, Nativa
- Current: 2026 season

The Primera División Femenina officially named Liga Femenina (currently known as Liga Femenina Apuesta Total 2025 for sponsorship reasons), is the top tournament of women's association football in Peru, organized by the Peruvian Football Federation through its Women's Football Commission. The competition, as an official tournament, was created in 1996 under de name of "Campeonato Metropolitano de Fútbol Femenino" (Metropolitan women's football championship), followed by the "Campeonato Nacional de Fútbol Femenino" (Peruvian women's football championship) which was renamed later as "Copa Femenina" and currently is designated as "Liga Femenina". The champion qualifies to the Copa Libertadores Femenina.

== History ==
=== Metropolitan women's football championship ===
Like the men's tournament, the Peruvian Primera División Femenina began on a regional and amateur basis. In 1996 the Peruvian female football competitions started with the creation of the "Campeonato Metropolitano de Fútbol Femenino" (Metropolitan women's football championship) organized by the Peruvian Football Federation and played with sport clubs from Lima and Callao. The champion of this first edition was the team of Club Universitario who repeated the achievement the following year, resulting in the first two-time championship. In 1999 the Sporting Cristal also became two-time champion by getting the titles of 1998 and 1999. Later, the team of Club Universitario obtained the first three-time championship in the history of Peruvian women's soccer by winning the 2001, 2002 and 2003 titles.

=== Campeonato Sudamericano Interclubes de Fútbol Femenino ===
In 2000, the FPF organized an unofficial international tournament called the Campeonato Sudamericano Interclubes de Fútbol Femenino, in which teams from Argentina, Colombia, Ecuador, Paraguay, Peru, Uruguay and Venezuela participated.

=== Women's football national championship ===
In 2008 the Peruvian Football Federation modified the competition scheme to give it a national scope, setting the tournament in three fases: provincial, regional and national. With this new competition format, the tournament was renamed "Campeonato Nacional de Fútbol Femenino" (women's football national championship), and incorporated the former tournament (Campeonato Metropolitano de Fútbol Femenino) as the Region IV (Lima & Callao) of its regional stage.

Regional stage	Departments
Region I	Amazonas, Lambayeque, Piura, Tumbes
Region II	Áncash, Cajamarca, La Libertad, San Martín
Region III	Loreto, Ucayali
Region IV	Lima, Callao
Region V	Huánuco, Junín, Pasco
Region VI	Ayacucho, Huancavelica, Ica
Region VII	Arequipa, Moquegua, Tacna
Region VIII	Apurímac, Cusco, Madre de Dios, Puno

Since 2009 the champion qualifies for the Copa Libertadores Femenina. the first champion under this new format was the team of White Star. That same year, the Peruvian Football Federation and the FIFA agreed to incorporate representatives of the Women's football Championship into the FPF Bases Assembly, thus granting them greater participation in the decisions of the governing body of Peruvian football In 2012 the team of JC Sport Girls became three-times champion, while in 2016 the team of Club Universitario de Deportes won the tri-championship for the second time. As of 2017, the Peruvian Football Federation decided to accommodate its calendar to that of Conmebol so that the local women's tournaments would not intersect with the development of the Copa Libertadores Femenina. Until that time, the tournament schedule had no relation to the annual calendar; that is, the national championship of one year was defined the following year.

=== Liga Femenina ===
In 2020 the Peruvian Football Federation decides to professionalize women's football for which it issues Resolution No. 014-2020-FPF that provides for "strengthening the traditional National System of Women's football Championships, hereinafter referred to as FPF Liga Femenina". The first season was expected to take place in 2020, but was delayed until 2021 due to COVID-19 pandemic. In 2021, this new format was resumed and it was played under the name of FPF Liga Femenina and under the auspices of the private television network Movistar TV. In the 2021, 2022, 2024 and 2025 seasons the title was won by the Alianza Lima club, while in 2023 it was won by Universitario, which thus achieved its tenth championship.

Results of the 'Big Three' in the Liga Femenina (Professional era)
Season	ALI	CRI	UNI
2021	1	4	2
2022	1	4	3
2023	2	4	1
2024	1	3	2
2025	1	3	2
2026	2	3	1
TOTAL	4	0	2
Top three	6	3	6
out of 10
Champions; Second place Third place

== Division levels ==
Year	Level	Relegation to
1996–2019	1	(None)
2020	–	(None)
2021	1	(None)
2022–present	1	Liga de Ascenso Femenina

== Competition format and sponsorship ==
=== Domestic ===
Currently, the season is played in two stages: First stage and Final stage (Playoffs). The First stage is played under a single round-robin format with the 12 teams playing each other once. The Final stage is contested by teams ranked 1st to 6th in the First stage, with teams ranked 1st and 2nd directly qualified for semifinals and teams ranked 3rd to 6th qualified for a previous qualifying round or repechage to reach the semifinals. Winners of semifinals play the final to decide the national champion.

Number of clubs in Liga Femenina throughout the years
Period (in years)	No. of clubs
2021–2022	13 clubs
2023	14 clubs
2024	13 clubs
2025	12 clubs
2026	11 clubs

=== South American qualification ===
The Copa Libertadores Femenina is held annually in South America, and Peru is granted one berth in the competition, which is awarded to the season’s champion.

=== Sponsorship ===
The Peruvian First Division is currently sponsored by Apuesta Total, with the official sponsorship name being Liga Femenina Apuesta Total.

== 2026 teams ==
=== Stadia and locations ===
Locations of the 2026 Liga Femenina teams

Team	City	Stadium	Capacity
Alianza Lima	Lima	Alejandro Villanueva	35,398
Atlético Andahuaylas	Andahuaylas	Los Chankas	10,000
Carlos A. Mannucci	Trujillo	Mansiche	25,036
Defensores del Ilucán	Cutervo	Juan Maldonado Gamarra	12,000
Deportivo Yanapuma	Iquitos	Max Augustín	24,576
Flamengo	Huancayo	Huancayo	20,000
Killas	Lima	Andrés Bedoya Díaz	10,000
Melgar	Arequipa	Virgen de Chapi	40,370
Sporting Cristal	Lima	Alberto Gallardo	11,600
Universitario de Deportes	Lima	Monumental	80,093
UNSAAC	Cusco	Estadio Garcilaso	45,056

== Seasons in Liga Femenina ==
There are 22 teams that have taken part in 6 Liga Femenina that was played from the 2021 season until the 2026 season. The teams in bold compete in Peruvian Liga Femenina currently. The year in parentheses represents the most recent year of participation at this level. Alianza Lima, Carlos A. Mannucci, Killas, Sporting Cristal and Universitario are the only teams that have played Peruvian Liga Femenina football in every season.

- 6 seasons: **Alianza Lima** (2026), **Carlos A. Mannucci** (2026), **Killas** (2026), **Sporting Cristal** (2026), **Universitario de Deportes** (2026)
- 5 seasons: Universidad César Vallejo (2025)
- 4 seasons: **Defensores del Ilucán** (2026), **Melgar** (2026), Academia Cantolao (2024), Ayacucho (2024), Deportivo Municipal (2004)
- 3 seasons: **UNSAAC** (2026), Atlético Trujillo (2023), Universidad San Martín (2023)
- 2 seasons: Biavo (2025), **Flamengo** (2025), Sport Boys (2022), UTC (2022)
- 1 season: **Atlético Andahuaylas** (2026), **Deportivo Yanapuma** (2026), Real Áncash (2025), Sporting Victoria (2023)

== List of champions ==
- (In bracket, title count):

Ed.	Season	Champion	Runner-up	Winning manager
Campeonato Metropolitano de Lima & Callao
1	1996	Universitario de Deportes (1)	Sporting Cristal	(Peru) Luis Sánchez
2	1997	Universitario de Deportes (2)	Sporting Cristal	(Peru) Luis Sánchez
3	1998	Sporting Cristal (1)	Sport Coopsol	(Peru) Lizandro Barbarán
4	1999	Sporting Cristal (2)	Sport Coopsol	(Peru) Lizandro Barbarán
5	2000	Sport Coopsol (1)	Sporting Cristal	(Peru) David Zuluaga
6	2001	Universitario de Deportes (3)	Sport Boys	(Peru) Luis Sánchez
7	2002	Universitario de Deportes (4)	Sport Boys	(Peru) Luis Sánchez
8	2003	Universitario de Deportes (5)	Sport Boys	(Peru) Luis Sánchez
9	2004	JC Sport Girls (1)	Sport Boys	(Peru) Lizandro Barbarán
–	2005	No tournament was held due to participation in the 2005 Bolivarian Games^{[A]}		
10	2006	JC Sport Girls (2)	Municipalidad de Surco	
–	2007	No tournament was held due to reorganization. However, regional tournaments were held.		
Campeonato Nacional de Fútbol Femenino
11	2008	White Star (1)	Estudiantes Universitarios	(Peru) Inés Chite Tafur
12	2009	Universidad Particular de Iquitos (1)	UNSAAC	(Peru) Manuel Acevedo
13	2010	JC Sport Girls (3)	River San Borja	(Peru) Pedro Olivares
14	2011	JC Sport Girls (4)	Electro Oriente	(Peru) Pedro Olivares
15	2012	JC Sport Girls (5)	Internacional	(Peru) Betshabé Sánchez
16	2013	Real Maracaná (1)	Internacional	(Peru) Carolina Portugal
17	2014	Universitario de Deportes (6)	Alfredo Vargas Guerra	(Peru) Víctor Pompeyo
18	2015	Universitario de Deportes (7)	CGTP	(Peru) Marcelo Apaza
19	2016	Universitario de Deportes (8)	Ramiro Villafuerte	(Peru) Jarrinson Romero
20	2017	JC Sport Girls (6)	Deportivo Educación Física	(Peru) Giovanni Sosa
Copa Perú Femenina
21	2018	Municipalidad de Majes (1)	JC Sport Girls	(Peru) Ela Samayani Gómez
22	2019	Universitario de Deportes (9)	Amazon Sky	(Peru) Juan Pablo Durand
Liga Femenina
–	2020	Canceled due to the COVID-19 pandemic.		
23	2021	Alianza Lima (1)	Universitario de Deportes	(Peru) Samir Mendoza
24	2022	Alianza Lima (2)	Carlos A. Mannucci	(Peru) Samir Mendoza
25	2023	Universitario de Deportes (10)	Alianza Lima	(Colombia) Jhon Tierradentro
26	2024	Alianza Lima (3)	Universitario de Deportes	(Chile) José Letelier
27	2025	Alianza Lima (4)	Universitario de Deportes	(Chile) José Letelier
28	2026	Universitario de Deportes (11)	Alianza Lima	(Chile) Carlos Véliz

== Titles by club ==
- There are 9 clubs who have won the Peruvian title.
- Teams in **bold** compete in the Liga Femenina as of the 2026 season.
- Italics indicates clubs that no longer exist or disaffiliated from the FPF.

Rank.	Club	Total	Amateur era (1996–2019)			Professional era (2020–)
Rank.	Club	Total	Campeonato Metropolitano Lima & Callao (1996–2007)	Campeonato Nacional de Fútbol Femenino (2008–2017)	Copa Perú Femenina (2018–2019)	Liga Femenina (2020–)
1	**Universitario de Deportes**	11	5	3	1	2
2	JC Sport Girls	6	2	4	—	—
3	**Alianza Lima**	4	—	—	—	4
4	**Sporting Cristal**	2	2	—	—	—
5	Sport Coopsol	1	1	—	—	—
5	White Star	1	—	1	—	—
5	Municipalidad de Majes	1	—	—	1	—
5	Real Maracaná	1	—	1	—	—
5	Universidad Particular de Iquitos	1	—	1	—	—

=== Total titles won by club ===
Rank	Club	Titles	Runners-up	Seasons won	Seasons runner-up
1	**Universitario de Deportes**	11	3	1996, 1997, 2001, 2002, 2003, 2014, 2015, 2016, 2019, 2023, 2026	2021, 2024, 2025
2	JC Sport Girls	6	1	2004, 2006, 2010, 2011, 2012, 2017	2018
3	**Alianza Lima**	4	2	2021, 2022, 2024, 2025	2023, 2026
4	**Sporting Cristal**	2	3	1998, 1999	1996, 1997, 2000
5	Sport Coopsol	1	2	2000	1998, 1999
5	White Star	1	—	2008	—
5	Municipalidad de Majes	1	—	2018	—
5	Real Maracaná	1	—	2013	—
5	Universidad Particular de Iquitos	1	—	2009	—

== Titles by region ==
Region	Nº of titles	Clubs
Lima	25	Universitario de Deportes (11), JC Sport Girls (6), Alianza Lima (4), Sporting Cristal (2), Sport Coopsol (1), Real Maracaná (1)
Arequipa	2	White Star (1), Municipalidad de Majes (1)
(Loreto Region) Loreto	1	Universidad Particular de Iquitos (1)

== Half-year / Short tournaments ==
=== Apertura and Clausura seasons ===
Season		Champion	Runner-up
Campeonato Metropolitano de Lima & Callao
1997	Apertura	Universitario de Deportes	Sporting Cristal
1997	Clausura	Universitario de Deportes	Sporting Cristal
1999	Apertura	Sporting Cristal	
1999	Clausura	Sport Coopsol	
2002	Apertura	Universitario de Deportes	Sport Boys
2002	Clausura	Sport Boys	Universitario
2003	Apertura	Universitario de Deportes	Sport Boys
2003	Clausura	Sport Boys	Universitario de Deportes
2003	Final	Universitario de Deportes	Sport Boys
2006	Apertura	JC Sport Girls	Municipalidad de Surco
2006	Clausura	JC Sport Girls	Municipalidad de Surco
Liga Femenina
2025	Apertura	Alianza Lima	Universitario de Deportes
2025	Clausura	Universitario de Deportes	Alianza Lima
2026	Apertura	Universitario de Deportes	Sporting Cristal
2026	Clausura	Universitario de Deportes	Alianza Lima

== Top scorers ==
Ed.	Season	Leading goalscorer(s)
Campeonato Metropolitano de Lima & Callao
3	1998	(Peru) Olienka Salinas (Sporting Cristal; 36 goals)
4	1999	(Peru) Olienka Salinas (Sporting Cristal; 17 goals)
5	2000	(Peru) Olienka Salinas (Sporting Cristal)
Campeonato Nacional de Fútbol Femenino
11	2008	(Peru) Susane Salas (White Star; 11 goals)
12	2009	(Peru) Emily Flores (UPI; 12 goals)
15	2012	(Peru) Gladys Dorador (JC Sport Girls; 10 goals)
Liga Femenina
23	2021	(Peru) Adriana Lúcar (Alianza Lima; 23 goals)
24	2022	(Peru) Luz Campoverde (Carlos A. Mannucci; 18 goals)
25	2023	(Peru) Adriana Lúcar (Alianza Lima; 17 goals)
26	2024	(Peru) Adriana Lúcar (Alianza Lima; 20 goals)
27	2025	(Peru) Pierina Núñez (Universitario de Deportes; 24 goals)
28	2026	(Brazil) Tamara Alves (Sporting Cristal; 26 goals)

== Footnotes ==
A. In 2005, the League not played due to Peruvian participation in the 2005 Bolivarian Games
