= 2006 Campeonato Metropolitano de Fútbol Femenino (Peru) =

Campeonato Nacional de Fútbol Femenino
- Season: 2006
- Champions: JC Sport Girls (2nd title)

The 2006 Campeonato Metropolitano de Fútbol Femenino season, was an amateur women's football championship, developed, organized, and promoted by the Peruvian Football Federation (FPF). Since JC Sport Girls won both the Apertura and Clausura tournaments, no playoff games were played and JC Sport Girls were declared as season champions. The UNE La Cantuta club withdrew before the start of the season.

== Teams ==
Team	City
JC Sport Girls	Lima
Deportivo Municipal (La Molina)	Lima
Municipalidad de Surco	Lima
Nene Cubillas	Lima
Real Maracaná	Lima
Universidad San Marcos	Lima

== Torneo Apertura ==
=== Standings ===
Pos	Team	Pld	W	D	L	Pts	Qualification or relegation	JCS	MSU	REA	USM	NEN	MLM
1	JC Sport Girls	5	5	0	0	15	Apertura winner		2–1			19–0	14–0
2	Municipalidad de Surco	5	4	0	1	12					2–0	16–0	
3	Real Maracaná	5	3	0	2	9		0–6	0–5		4–1		
4	Universidad San Marcos	5	2	0	3	6		0–13					—
5	Nene Cubillas	5	1	0	4	3				0–8	0–3		4–0
6	Deportivo Municipal (La Molina)	5	0	0	5	0			0–13	0–14			

Rules for classification: 1) Points; 2) Goal difference; 3) Goals for; 4) Fair play points; 5) Drawing of lots.

== Torneo Clausura ==
=== Standings ===
Pos	Team	Pld	W	D	L	Pts	Qualification or relegation	JCS	MSU	USM	REA	NEN	MLM
1	JC Sport Girls	5	5	0	0	15	Clausura winner			13–0	—		
2	Municipalidad de Surco	4	3	0	1	9		1–4			—		15–0
3	Universidad San Marcos	4	3	0	1	9			—		—	3–0	
4	Real Maracaná	5	2	0	3	6						4–0	7–1
5	Nene Cubillas	4	0	0	4	0		—	0–6				
6	Deportivo Municipal (La Molina)	4	0	0	4	0		0–20		—		—	

Rules for classification: 1) Points; 2) Goal difference; 3) Goals for; 4) Fair play points; 5) Drawing of lots.
