= Márcio Cordeiro =

Brazilian footballer

Personal information
- Full name: Márcio Cordeiro de Paula
- Date of birth: 7 January 1993 (age 33)
- Place of birth: Iguape, Brazil
- Height: 1.89 m (6 ft 2 1/2 in)
- Position: Defender

Youth career
- 2005–2007: Santo André
- 2008: Portuguesa Santista
- 2009: Londrina
- 2010: Luverdense

Senior career*
Years	Team	Apps	(Gls)
2011	Guarujá		
2012	São Vicente	10	(0)
2013	Independente de Limeira	0	(0)
2013–2014	Trofense	24	(1)
2014–2015	Portuguesa Santista	0	(0)
2015–2017	Vizela		
- * Club domestic league appearances and goals as of 24 April 2016

Márcio Cordeiro de Paula, known as Márcio Cordeiro (born 7 January 1993) is a Brazilian football player who.

== Club career ==
He made his professional debut in the Segunda Liga for Trofense on 10 August 2013 in a game against Benfica B.
