= Copa Venezuela Femenina =

- Founded: 2023
- Country: Venezuela
- Confederation: CONMEBOL
- Number of clubs: 20
- Current champions: Caracas (2025)
- Most championships: Caracas; Hermanos Páez; ULA (1)
- Current: 2025

The Copa Venezuela Femenina de Fútbol (English: Venezuela Cup) is the national cup women's football competition of Venezuela. The competition is organised by the Venezuelan Football Federation.

== History ==
It begins with the assembly of participating teams in 2023 with teams from the Women's First Division and the rest of Venezuela.

== List of champions ==
Ed.	Season	Champion	Runner-up
1	2023	ULA	Hermanos Páez
2	2024	Hermanos Páez	Deportivo Táchira
3	2025	Caracas	Academia Yurubí

== Titles by club ==
Club	Titles	Seasons won
Caracas	1	2025
ULA	1	2023
Hermanos Páez	1	2024
