= Gerimex =

Gerimex are a Bolivian women's football club based in Santa Cruz de la Sierra. They won the Bolivian League for the first time in 2011. Gerimex thus qualified for the 2011 Copa Libertadores de Fútbol Femenino, the UEFA Champions League pendant.

They finished runners-up in the 2012 Bolivian women's football championship.

Gerimex was renamed Santa Cruz FC in 2012.

== Achievements ==
- Bolivian women's football championship: 2011
