= 2008 Campeonato Nacional de Fútbol Femenino (Perú) =

Campeonato Nacional de Fútbol Femenino
- Season: 2008
- Champions: White Star
- Copa Libertadores: White Star
- Top goalscorer: Susane Salas (11 goals)

The 2008 Campeonato Nacional de Fútbol Femenino season, was an amateur women's football championship, developed, organized, and promoted by the Peruvian Football Federation (FPF), which granted the classification to the 2009 Copa Libertadores Femenina.

White Star won their first title after defeating Estudiantes Universitarios by a 3–2 score in the finals. As champions, White Star qualified for the 2009 Copa Libertadores Femenina.

== Regional Stage ==
Department	Team
Apurímac	Las Mercedes
Arequipa	White Star
Arequipa	IDUNSA
Ayacucho	Deportivo Municipal (Huamanga)
Cajamarca	Nueva Juventud Encañada
Cusco	Estudiantes Universitarios
Huánuco	San Francisco
Lambayeque	Universidad de Chiclayo
Loreto	ADO
Moquegua	Cruz del Siglo
Puno	Diablos Rojos
Tacna	Arías Aragüez

== National Stage ==
=== Grupo A ===
Pos	Team	Pld	W	D	L	GF	GA	GD	Pts	Qualification or relegation	IDU	DIA	FRA	UCH
1	IDUNSA	3	3	0	0	16	1	+15	9	Advance to Semifinals		8–0	5–1	
2	Diablos Rojos	3	2	0	1	5	8	−3	6				2–0	
3	San Francisco	3	1	0	2	5	7	−2	3					4–0
4	Universidad de Chiclayo	3	0	0	3	0	10	−10	0		0–3	0–3		

Rules for classification: 1) Points; 2) Goal difference; 3) Goals for; 4) Fair play points; 5) Drawing of lots.

=== Grupo B ===
Pos	Team	Pld	W	D	L	GF	GA	GD	Pts	Qualification or relegation	ADO	EST	ARI	NJE
1	ADO	3	2	1	0	9	2	+7	7	Advance to Semifinals			1–1	3–0
2	Estudiantes Universitarios	3	2	0	1	7	7	0	6	Advance to Semifinals	1–5		3–1	
3	Arías Aragüez	3	0	2	1	3	5	−2	2					1–1
4	Nueva Juventud Encañada	3	0	1	2	2	7	−5	1			1–3		

Rules for classification: 1) Points; 2) Goal difference; 3) Goals for; 4) Fair play points; 5) Drawing of lots.

=== Grupo C ===
Pos	Team	Pld	W	D	L	GF	GA	GD	Pts	Qualification or relegation	WHI	MER	CRU	MUN
1	White Star	3	3	0	0	17	0	+17	9	Advance to Semifinals		6–0		
2	Las Mercedes	3	2	0	1	6	6	0	6				4–0	2–0
3	Cruz del Siglo	3	1	0	2	2	13	−11	3		0–9			2–0
4	Deportivo Municipal (Huamanga)	3	0	0	3	0	6	−6	0		0–2			

Rules for classification: 1) Points; 2) Goal difference; 3) Goals for; 4) Fair play points; 5) Drawing of lots.

== Semifinals ==
4 April 2009	IDUNSA	1–2	Estudiantes Universitarios	Estadio Melgar, Arequipa

4 April 2009	White Star	2–2 (3–1 p)	ADO	Estadio Melgar, Arequipa

== Final ==
5 April 2009	White Star	3–2	Estudiantes Universitarios	Virgen de Chapi, Arequipa
	Katty Sanz 37'; Patricia Gonzales 65'; Lucía Segales 72'		Nataly Corrales 20'; Eugenia Gonzales 70'	Referee: Pamela Chávez
