= Arzul =

Brazilian footballer and goalkeeping coach (born 1972)

Personal information
- Full name: Sebastião Martins Oliveira Júnior
- Date of birth: 7 February 1972 (age 54)
- Place of birth: Santos, Brazil
- Position: Goalkeeper

Youth career
- Portuguesa Santista
- 1984–1990: Juventus

Senior career*
Years	Team	Apps	(Gls)
1990–1995	Juventus		
1996	Paulista		
1997	Guarujá		
1998–1999	Santos (futsal)		

Managerial career
- 2009–2024: Santos (goalkeeping coach)
- * Club domestic league appearances and goals

Sebastião Martins Oliveira Júnior (born 7 February 1972), commonly known as Arzul, is a Brazilian football coach and former player who played as a goalkeeper.

== Career ==
Born in Santos, São Paulo, Arzul represented Portuguesa Santista and Juventus-SP as a youth; initially a centre forward, he was converted into a goalkeeper after arriving late to a training session. After impressing in his new position, he was nicknamed Arzul due to his physical likeness to Julio César Arzú, a goalkeeper of Honduras in the 1982 FIFA World Cup.

Arzul made his senior debut with Juventus in 1990, also playing in the year's Série B. He subsequently played for Paulista and Guarujá before switching to futsal.

Arzul joined Santos' futsal side in 1998, and started his coaching career in the following year, being a goalkeeping coach of the youth futsal categories. He retired in 2000 after knee injuries, and moved back to football under the same coaching role.

Arzul was promoted as the main squad's goalkeeping coach in 2009 by head coach Vanderlei Luxemburgo. In 2020, after completing 22 years in the club, he was inducted to be included in the club's Wall of Fame, painted in the outside of the CT Rei Pelé, where other club idols were included.

On 3 January 2025, Arzul was dismissed from Santos after more than 20 years of service.
