= Lizandro Barbarán =

Peruvian football manager (born 1964)

Personal information
- Full name: Lizandro Barbarán Pinedo
- Date of birth: 18 February 1964
- Place of birth: Iquitos, Peru

Managerial career
- Years: Team
- 1998–2000: Sporting Cristal (women)
- 2004: JC Sport Girls
- 2005: Peru (women)
- 2006: Panama (women)
- 2007–2009: Peru (women)
- 2009: Hijos de Acosvinchos (assistant)
- 2010–2011: Coronel Bolognesi
- 2012: Atlético Minero
- 2013: Alianza Universidad
- 2014: Comerciantes Unidos
- 2015: Coronel Bolognesi
- 2016: Diablos Rojos
- 2016: Sport Rosario
- 2017: Alfredo Salinas
- 2017: José Gálvez
- 2018: Credicoop San Cristóbal
- 2019: Estudiantil CNI
- 2021: Unión San Martín
- 2022: Sport Rosario
- 2022: Estudiantil CNI
- 2023: San Andrés Runtu
- 2023: Star Áncash
- 2024: Sporting Cristal (women)
- 2024: Diablos Rojos
- 2025: Alto Rendimiento JVM
- 2025: Dinamo de Solabaya

Lizandro Barbarán Pinedo (born 18 February 1964) is a Peruvian football manager.

== Biography ==
Lizandro Barbarán began his career in women's football. He coached the Peruvian women's team in 2005, winning the Bolivarian Games against Colombia. The following year, he coached the Panamanian women's team at the 2006 CONCACAF Women's Gold Cup.

Between 2010 and 2011, Barbarán took charge of Coronel Bolognesi in the Peruvian 2nd division. In 2016, he won the Copa Perú with Sport Rosario.

In 2024, he tried his hand at women's football again and took charge of the Sporting Cristal women's team.

== Honours ==
Sporting Cristal (women)

- Primera División Femenina (2): 1998, 1999

Peru (women)

- Bolivarian Games: 2005

Sport Rosario

- Copa Perú: 2016
