= 2004 Campeonato Metropolitano de Fútbol Femenino (Peru) =

Campeonato Nacional de Fútbol Femenino
- Season: 2004
- Champions: JC Sport Girls (1st title)
- Top goalscorer: Olenka Salinas (18)

The 2004 Campeonato Metropolitano de Fútbol Femenino season, also known as the Copa Pilsen Callao, was an amateur women's football championship, developed, organized, and promoted by the Peruvian Football Federation (FPF).

JC Sport Girls won their first title.

== Teams ==
Team	City
Deportivo Municipal (Chorrillos)	Lima
JC Sport Girls	Lima
Petroperú	Lima
Real Maracaná	Lima
Sport Boys	Callao
Universidad San Marcos	Lima

== League table ==
=== Standings ===
Pos	Team	Pld	W	D	L	GF	GA	GD	Pts	Qualification or relegation	JCS	PET	SBA	REA	USM	MUN
1	JC Sport Girls	10	9	1	0	35	2	+33	28	Liguilla Final		1–1	2–1	5–0	5–0	6–0
2	Petroperú	10	7	2	1	42	6	+36	23	Liguilla Final	0–1		9–2	5–0	—	4–0
3	Sport Boys	10	6	1	3	35	30	+5	19	Liguilla Final	0–5	1–1		—	8–0	6–1
4	Real Maracaná	10	4	0	6	19	37	−18	12		0–4	0–7	2–7		5–3	—
5	Universidad San Marcos	10	1	1	8	6	38	−32	4		0–2	1–3	1–3	—		1–0
6	Deportivo Municipal (Chorrillos)	10	0	1	9	3	27	−24	1		0–4	0–5	—	0–2	1–1	

Rules for classification: 1) Points; 2) Goal difference; 3) Goals for; 4) Fair play points; 5) Drawing of lots.

== Liguilla Final ==
=== Standings ===
Pos	Team	Pld	W	D	L	GF	GA	GD	Pts	Qualification or relegation	SBA	JCS	PET
1	Sport Boys	2	1	0	1	4	3	+1	3	Title Playoff			3–1
2	JC Sport Girls	2	1	0	1	2	2	0	3	Title Playoff	2–1		
3	Petroperú	2	1	0	1	2	3	−1	3			1–0	

Rules for classification: 1) Points; 2) Goal difference; 3) Goals for; 4) Fair play points; 5) Drawing of lots.

==== Title Playoff ====
18 December 2004

Sport Boys	1–2	JC Sport Girls
Roxana Llerena 34'		Aissa Garibay 20' 29'

Lima
