= Estádio Municipal Antônio Fernandes =

Football stadium in Guarujá, São Paulo, Brazil

Coordinates: 23°59′50″S 46°16′16″W

Estádio Municipal
- Interactive map of Estádio Municipal
- Full name: Estádio Municipal Antônio Fernandes
- Location: Guarujá
- Owner: Guarujá Municipality
- Capacity: 6,840

Tenant
- Associação Desportiva Guarujá

The Estádio Municipal Antônio Fernandes, is a football stadium located in Guarujá, São Paulo, Brazil. It has a maximum capacity of 8,000 people. The stadium is owned by the Guarujá City Hall. The Associação Desportiva Guarujá play their home games at this stadium. It is one of the two hosts of the 2009 Copa Libertadores de Fútbol Femenino.
