= 2012 Campeonato Nacional de Fútbol Femenino (Perú) =

Campeonato Nacional de Fútbol Femenino
- Season: 2012
- Champions: JC Sport Girls
- Copa Libertadores: JC Sport Girls
- Top goalscorer: (Peru) Gladys Dorador (10)

The 2012 Campeonato Nacional de Fútbol Femenino season, was an amateur women's football championship, developed, organized, and promoted by the Peruvian Football Federation (FPF), which granted the classification to the 2013 Copa Libertadores Femenina.

JC Sport Girls won their fifth title after defeating Internacional by a 3–0 score in the finals. As champions, JC Sport Girls qualified for the 2013 Copa Libertadores Femenina.

== Regional Stage ==
Department	Team
Apurímac	Angelu Lucrecia
Arequipa	Internacional
Ayacucho	Percy Berrocal
Huánuco	UNDAC
Lima	JC Sport Girls
Loreto	Estudiantil Juan Pablo II

== National stage ==
=== Grupo A ===
Pos	Team	Pld	W	D	L	GF	GA	GD	Pts	Qualification or relegation	INT	JP	UND
1	Internacional	3	3	0	0	12	3	+9	9	Advance to Final			4–1
2	Estudiantil Juan Pablo II	3	1	0	2	4	14	−10	3		1–2		
3	UNDAC	3	1	0	2	5	7	−2	3			—	

Rules for classification: 1) Points; 2) Goal difference; 3) Goals for; 4) Fair play points; 5) Drawing of lots.

=== Grupo B ===
Pos	Team	Pld	W	D	L	GF	GA	GD	Pts	Qualification or relegation	JCS	LUC	PER
1	JC Sport Girls	3	3	0	0	30	0	+30	9	Advance to Final			—
2	Angelu Lucrecia	3	1	0	2	2	15	−13	3		—		
3	Percy Berrocal	3	0	0	3	0	14	−14	0			—	

Rules for classification: 1) Points; 2) Goal difference; 3) Goals for; 4) Fair play points; 5) Drawing of lots.

==== Interzonal matches ====
Home	Score	Away
Internacional	6–1	Angelu Lucrecia

== Final ==
29 September 2013	JC Sport Girls	3–0	Internacional	VIDENA, Chincha
	Liliana Neyra 23'; Gladys Dorador 60' 80'
