= 2012 Bolivian women's football championship =

Bolivian women's football championship
- Season: 2012
- Champions: Universidad (Santa Cruz)
- 2012 Copa Libertadores Femenina: Universidad (Santa Cruz)
- Matches: 13
- Goals: 46 (3.54 per match)
- Top goalscorer: Luciel Pérez (6)

The 2012 Bolivian women's football championship was the eighth edition of the tournament. It was held from 22 to 26 October 2012 in the city of Santa Cruz. It was contested by seven regional champions and determined the 2012 Bolivian women's football champion and served as qualification to the continental championship, the 2012 Copa Libertadores Femenina.

Santa Cruz FC, who competed last year under then name Gerimex FC, were the defending champions. For the eighth time the title went to a team from Santa Cruz when Universidad de Santa Cruz (Universidad Autónoma Gabriel René Moreno, UAGRM) won its title.

== Format ==
Seven teams were divided into two groups of four and three teams. After all teams played each other once the two best placed teams per group moved onto the semi-finals.

== Group stage ==
=== Group A ===
Team	Pld	W	D	L	GF	GA	GD	Pts
Santa Cruz (Santa Cruz)	3	3	0	0	12	1	+8	9
Aurora (Cochabamba)	3	2	0	1	8	5	+3	6
Estudiantes (Santa Cruz)	3	1	0	2	7	8	–1	3
Valencia JV (Oruro)	3	0	0	3	0	13	–13	0

Day 1:

- Aurora 4–2 Estudiantes
- Santa Cruz 5–0 Valencia JV

Day 2:

- Aurora 4–0 Valencia JV
- Santa Cruz 4–1 Estudiantes

Day 3:

- Santa Cruz 3–0 FC Aurora
- Estudiantes 4–0 Valencia JV

=== Group B ===
Team	Pld	W	D	L	GF	GA	GD	Pts
Universidad (Santa Cruz)	2	2	0	0	4	1	+3	6
San Martín (Tarija)	2	1	0	1	3	2	+1	3
Deportivo Chuquisaca (Chuquisaca)	2	0	0	2	0	4	–4	0

Day 1:

- Universidad 2–0 Deportivo Chuquisaca

Day 2:

- San Martín 2–0 Deportivo Chuquisaca

Day 3:

- Universidad 2–1 San Martín

== Knock-out stage ==
=== Semi-finals ===
The semi-finals were played the next day after the last group matches.

25 October 2012
9:00

Santa Cruz FC (Santa Cruz)	1 – 0	San Martín de Porres (Tarija)
Zamorano 32'	Report

Universidad, Santa Cruz
25 October 2012
11:00

Aurora (Cochabamba)	1 – 4	Universidad (Santa Cruz)
Huanca 76'	Report	Morón 12'; Yoselin Portales 37'; Cárdenas; Salvatierra 68'

Universidad, Santa Cruz

=== Third place match ===
26 October 2012
9:00

Aurora (Cochabamba)	1 – 2	San Martín de Porres (Tarija)
Loayza 21'	Report	Yanina López 9', 73'

Universidad, Santa Cruz

=== Final ===
26 October 2012
11:00

Santa Cruz FC (Santa Cruz)	1 – 2	Universidad (Santa Cruz)
Luciel Pérez 57'	Report	Morón 20', 35'

Universidad, Santa Cruz

== Top scorer ==
Santa Cruz FC's Luciel Pérez won the top-scorer award with her sixth goal in the final. Her teammate Maitté Zamorano scored five goals.
