= 2017 Campeonato Nacional de Fútbol Femenino (Perú) =

Campeonato Nacional de Fútbol Femenino
- Season: 2017
- Champions: JC Sport Girls
- Copa Libertadores: JC Sport Girls

The 2017 Campeonato Nacional de Fútbol Femenino season, was an amateur women's football championship, developed, organized, and promoted by the Peruvian Football Federation (FPF), which granted the classification to the 2018 Copa Libertadores Femenina.

JC Sport Girls won their sixth title after defeating Deportivo Educación Física by a 7–1 score in the finals. As champions, JC Sport Girls qualified for the 2018 Copa Libertadores Femenina.

== Departamental Stage ==
| Department | Team |
|---|---|
| Áncash | Sport Chimbote |
| Apurímac | Deportivo Educación Física |
| Arequipa | Sporting Unión Arequipa |
| Cajamarca | San Juan de Chota |
| Huánuco | León de Huánuco |
| Huancavelica | Full Díaz |
| Junín | Ramiro Villaverde |
| La Libertad | Juventud Talentos |
| Lima | JC Sport Girls |
| Loreto | Juan Velazco Alvarado |

== National Stage ==
=== Grupo A ===
| Pos | Team | Pld | W | D | L | GF | GA | GD | Pts | Qualification or relegation | DEA | RAM | JUV | JVA |
|---|---|---|---|---|---|---|---|---|---|---|---|---|---|---|
| 1 | Deportivo Educación Física | 3 | 2 | 1 | 0 | 12 | 8 | +4 | 7 | Advance to Final | | | 4–2 | 6–4 |
| 2 | Ramiro Villaverde | 3 | 2 | 1 | 0 | 11 | 5 | +6 | 7 | | 2–2 | | | 5–1 |
| 3 | Juventud Talentos | 3 | 0 | 1 | 2 | 5 | 9 | −4 | 1 | | | 2–4 | | |
| 4 | Juan Velazco Alvarado | 3 | 0 | 1 | 2 | 6 | 12 | −6 | 1 | | | | 1–1 | |

Rules for classification: 1) Points; 2) Goal difference; 3) Goals for; 4) Fair play points; 5) Drawing of lots.

=== Grupo B ===
| Pos | Team | Pld | W | D | L | GF | GA | GD | Pts | Qualification or relegation | JCS | FUL | SPO | SAN |
|---|---|---|---|---|---|---|---|---|---|---|---|---|---|---|
| 1 | JC Sport Girls | 3 | 2 | 1 | 0 | 13 | 2 | +11 | 7 | Advance to Final | | 7–0 | | 1–1 |
| 2 | Full Díaz | 3 | 2 | 0 | 1 | 7 | 8 | −1 | 6 | | | | 2–0 | |
| 3 | Sporting Unión Arequipa | 3 | 1 | 0 | 2 | 4 | 8 | −4 | 3 | | 1–5 | | | |
| 4 | San Juan de Chota | 3 | 0 | 1 | 2 | 3 | 9 | −6 | 1 | | | 1–5 | 1–3 | |

Rules for classification: 1) Points; 2) Goal difference; 3) Goals for; 4) Fair play points; 5) Drawing of lots.

== Final ==
| 16 December 2017 | JC Sport Girls | 7–1 | Deportivo Educación Física | VIDENA, Chincha |
| 10:00 | Sandra Arévalo 1' 7' 42' 70'; Xioczana Canales 69'; Fabiola Herrera 73'; Nicole Cisneros 75' | | Maritza Pérez 59' |
