= 2013 Campeonato Nacional de Fútbol Femenino (Perú) =

Campeonato Nacional de Fútbol Femenino
- Season: 2013
- Champions: Real Macaraná
- Copa Libertadores: Real Maracaná

The 2013 Campeonato Nacional de Fútbol Femenino season, was an amateur women's football championship, developed, organized, and promoted by the Peruvian Football Federation (FPF), which granted the classification to the 2014 Copa Libertadores Femenina.

Real Maracaná won their first title after defeating Internacional by a 4–0 score in the finals. As champions, Real Maracaná qualified for the 2014 Copa Libertadores Femenina.

== Departamental Stage ==
Department	Team
Apurímac	Unión Panamericana
Arequipa	Internacional
Arequipa	Escuela Municipal de Majes
Ayacucho	Unión Mercedes
La Libertad	Colegio Champagnat
Lima	Real Maracaná
Pasco	Agüitas de Huayllay
Ucayali	Soria & Wong

== National stage ==
=== Grupo A ===
Pos	Team	Pld	W	D	L	GF	GA	GD	Pts	Qualification or relegation	INT	CHA	UNI	UPA
1	Internacional	3	3	0	0	11	0	+11	9	Advance to Final				8–0
2	Colegio Champagnat	3	2	0	1	8	2	+6	6		0–1		1–0	
3	Unión Mercedes	3	0	1	2	1	4	−3	1		0–2			
4	Unión Panamericana	3	0	1	2	2	16	−14	1			1–7	1–1	

Rules for classification: 1) Points; 2) Goal difference; 3) Goals for; 4) Fair play points; 5) Drawing of lots.

=== Grupo B ===
Pos	Team	Pld	W	D	L	GF	GA	GD	Pts	Qualification or relegation	REA	MAJ	AGU	SOR
1	Real Maracaná	3	2	1	0	20	3	+17	7	Advance to Final		1–1		
2	Escuela Municipal de Majes	3	2	1	0	12	5	+7	7					7–2
3	Agüitas de Huayllay	3	1	0	2	7	15	−8	3		2–9	2–4		
4	Soria & Wong	3	0	0	3	4	20	−16	0		0–10		2–3	

Rules for classification: 1) Points; 2) Goal difference; 3) Goals for; 4) Fair play points; 5) Drawing of lots.

== Final ==
6 July 2014	Real Maracaná	4–0	Internacional	Estadio Mariano Melgar, Arequipa
	Astrid Ramírez; María Cáceres; Scarlet Flores
