= 2011 Campeonato Nacional de Fútbol Femenino (Perú) =

Campeonato Nacional de Fútbol Femenino
- Season: 2011
- Champions: JC Sport Girls
- Copa Libertadores: JC Sport Girls
- Top goalscorer: (Peru) Emily Flores

The 2011 Campeonato Nacional de Fútbol Femenino season, was an amateur women's football championship, developed, organized, and promoted by the Peruvian Football Federation (FPF), which granted the classification to the 2012 Copa Libertadores Femenina.

JC Sport Girls won their fourth title after defeating Electro Oriente by a 2–0 score in the final. As champions, JC Sport Girls qualified for the 2012 Copa Libertadores Femenina.

== Regional Stage ==
Department	Team
Arequipa	Stella Maris
Ayacucho	Sport Club Berrocal
Cusco	Universitario UTEA
Lima	JC Sport Girls
Lima	Real Maracaná
Huánuco	Alianza Chaglla
Lambayeque	Las Águilas de Motupe
Loreto	Electro Oriente

== Final Stage ==
=== Third place ===
27 October 2012	Real Maracaná	5–0	Stella Maris	VIDENA, Chincha
10:00

=== Final ===
27 October 2012	JC Sport Girls	2–0	Electro Oriente	VIDENA, Chincha
12:00
