= Jessica Santacruz =

Paraguayan footballer (born 1990)

Personal information
- Full name: Jessica Antonella Santacruz Cáceres
- Date of birth: 22 January 1990 (age 36)
- Height: 1.70 m (5 ft 7 in)
- Position: Centre back

Team information
- Current team: FC Wacker Innsbruck

College career
Years	Team	Apps	(Gls)
2011	Friends Falcons		

Senior career*
Years	Team	Apps	(Gls)
201?–2018	Cerro Porteño		
2019	Sol de América		
2020	ŽNK Split		
2021 -	FC Wacker Innsbruck		

International career^{‡}
2010–2014	Paraguay	4	(0)
- * Club domestic league appearances and goals ‡ National team caps and goals as of 20 September 2014

Jessica Antonella Santacruz Cáceres (born 22 January 1990) is a Paraguayan footballer who plays for Austrian club FC Wacker Innsbruck. From 2010 to 2014, she has been a member of the Paraguay women's national team.

== International career ==
Santacruz played for Paraguay at senior level in two Copa América Femenina editions (2010 and 2014).
