= Nicol Sanhueza =

Chilean footballer (born 1992)

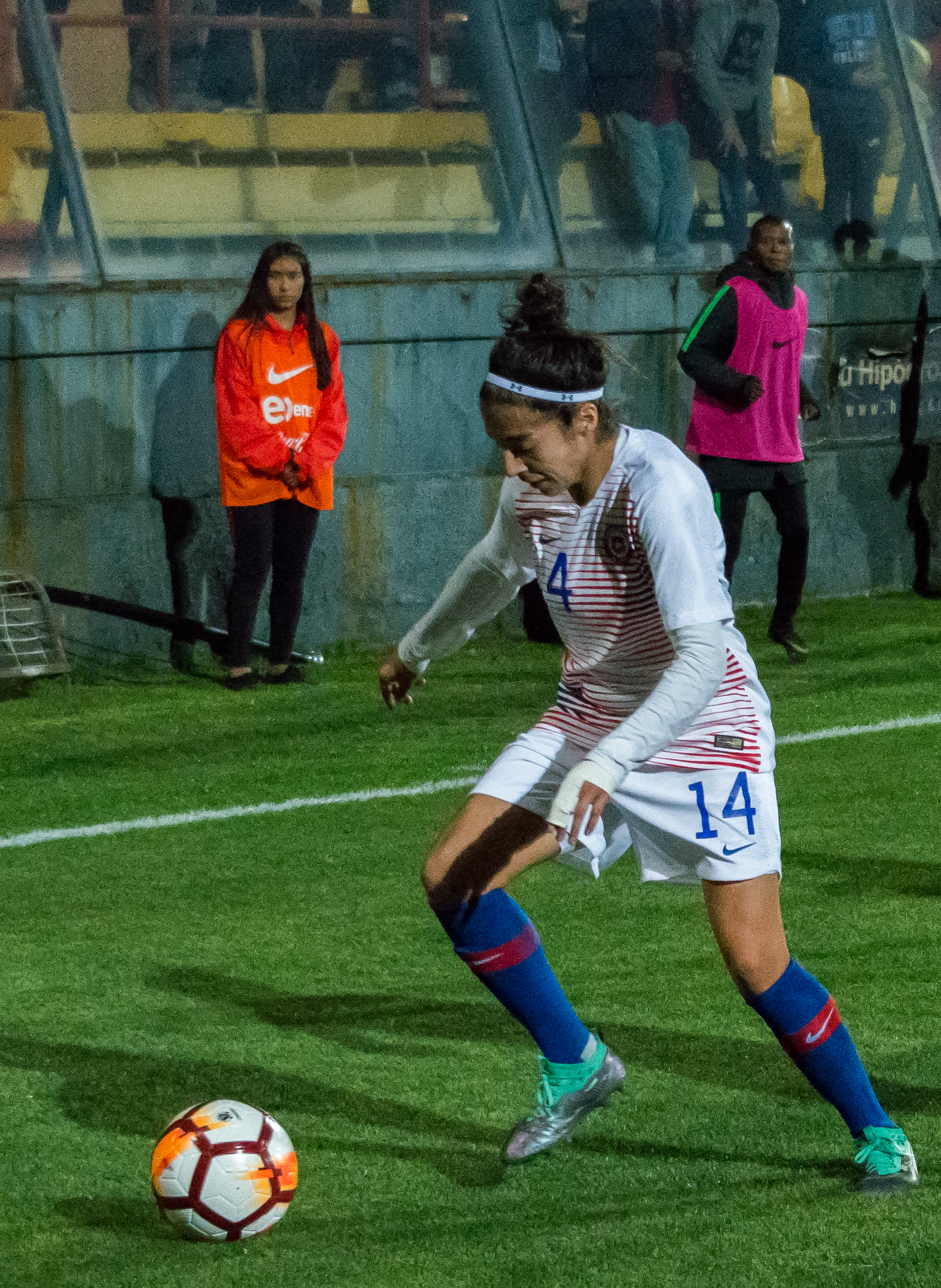
- Sanhueza with Chile in 2018

Personal information
- Full name: Nicol Stefania Sanhueza Herrera
- Date of birth: 13 March 1992 (age 34)
- Height: 1.57 m (5 ft 2 in)
- Position: Forward

Team information
- Current team: Deportes Iquique

Senior career*
Years	Team	Apps	(Gls)
- Everton
–2018	Palestino		
2019	3B da Amazônia		
2019	Palestino		
2020–2024	Colo-Colo		
2025	Universidad Católica	27	(5)
2026–	Deportes Iquique	0	(0)

International career^{‡}
2010–2012	Chile U20		
2017–2019	Chile (futsal)		
2018–	Chile	2	(0)
- * Club domestic league appearances and goals ‡ National team caps and goals as of 5 February 2026

Nicol Stefania Sanhueza Herrera (born 13 March 1992) is a Chilean footballer who plays as a forward for Deportes Iquique.

== Club career ==
In 2019, Sanhueza moved to Brazil and joined 3B da Amazônia.

Back in Chile, Sanhueza signed with Colo-Colo. She left them at the end of the 2024 season.

In 2025, Sanhueza joined Universidad Católica. The next year, she switched to Deportes Iquique.

== International career ==
As a futsal player, Sanhueza represented the Chile national team in the 2017 and the 2019 Copa América Femenina.

As a footballer, Sanhueza made her senior debut for Chile on 10 November 2018 in a 3–2 friendly win against Australia.

== Honours ==
Palestino

- Primera División (1): 2015 Clausura

Colo-Colo

- Primera División (2): 2022, 2023

Individual

- Premios Contragolpe - Ideal Team: 2021
