= EnForma Santa Cruz =

Bolivian women's football team

EnForma Santa Cruz are a Bolivian women's football club based in Santa Cruz de la Sierra. They won the Bolivian League five times. EnForma Santa Cruz were representing Bolivia in the 2009 Copa Libertadores de Fútbol Femenino. In that competition EnForma lost 4 matches and drew one game.

== Achievements ==
- Bolivian women's football championship:
  - Winners (5): 2005, 2006, 2007, 2008, 2009
