= Claudia Soto =

Chilean footballer (born 1993)

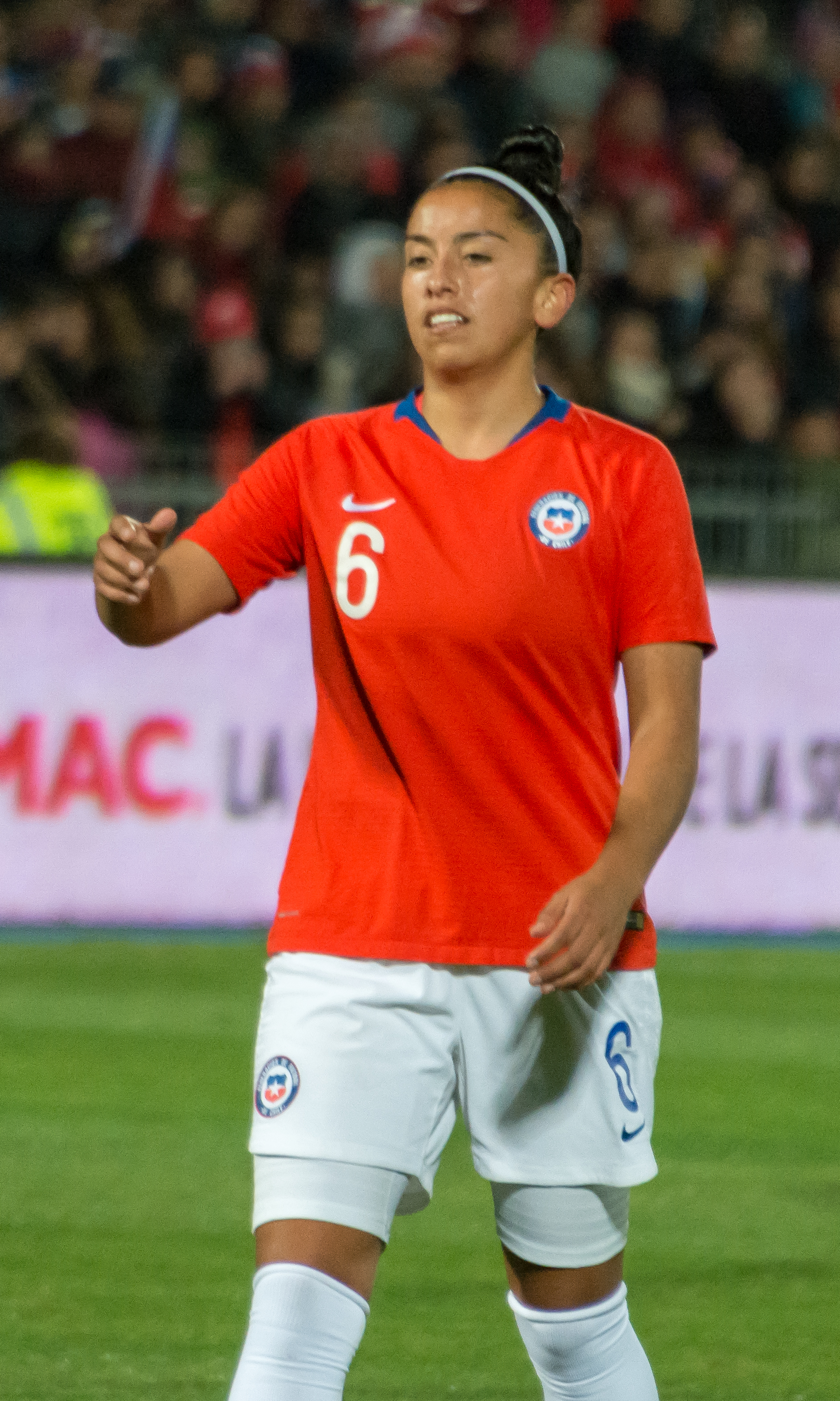

Personal information
- Full name: Claudia Paola Soto Figueroa
- Date of birth: 6 July 1993 (age 33)
- Place of birth: Chile Chico, Chile
- Height: 1.65 m (5 ft 5 in)
- Positions: Defensive midfielder; centre back

Senior career*
Years	Team	Apps	(Gls)
2012–2017	Colo-Colo		
2018	Audax/UNIP	8	(3)
2018	3B da Amazônia		
2019–2020	Santos	7	(1)
2020	Santiago Morning		
2021	Universidad de Chile		

International career
2010	Chile U17	2	(0)
2017–	Chile	26	(0)
- * Club domestic league appearances and goals

Claudia Paola Soto Figueroa (born 6 July 1993) is a Chilean former professional footballer who played as a defensive midfielder.

== Club career ==
Her last club was Universidad de Chile in 2021.

== International career ==
Soto represented Chile at the 2010 FIFA U-17 Women's World Cup.
