= 2018 Copa Perú Femenina =

Copa Perú Femenina
- Season: 2018
- Champions: Municipalidad de Majes
- Runner up: JC Sport Girls
- Copa Libertadores: Municipalidad de Majes

The 2018 Copa Perú Femenina season (Spanish: Copa Perú Femenina 2018), was an amateur women's football championship, developed, organized, and promoted by the Peruvian Football Federation (FPF), which granted the classification to the 2019 Copa Libertadores Femenina. This was the 1st edition of the Women's Copa Perú.

Municipalidad de Majes won their ninth title after defeating Amazon Sky by a 7–5 score in the penalty shoot-out). As champions, Municipalidad de Majes qualified for the 2019 Copa Libertadores Femenina.

== Departamental Stage ==
Department	Team
Apurímac	Real Unchiña
Arequipa	Sporting Unión Arequipa
Arequipa	Municipalidad de Majes
Ayacucho	Ayacucho
Cajamarca	Defensores del Ilucán
Cusco	AJI
Huancavelica	Full Díaz
Huánuco	Academia Aucayacu
Huánuco	Botica 24 Horas
Ica	Soccer Ica
Junín	Nueva Sociedad
Junín	Unión Puquiococha
La Libertad	FC Barça
Lambayeque	Juventus Ferreñafe

Department	Team
Lima	Inter JC Ladies
Lima	JC Sport Girls
Lima	La Cantera
Lima	Partizán Barranco
Lima	Sporting Cristal
Lima	Talemtus Callao
Lima	Universitario
Lima	Villa Libertad
Loreto	Amazon Sky
Madre de Dios	Hospital Santa Rosa
Moquegua	Bolívar Academia UJCM
Moquegua	UNAM
Pasco	Barrio San Francisco
Pasco	Unión Córdova
Tacna	EGB Saetas
Tacna	Defensor UNTAC

== Regional stage ==
=== Region II ===
==== Final ====
Team 1	Agg.	Team 2	1st leg	2nd leg
FC Barça	5–2	Defensores de Ilucán	4–0	1–2

=== Region IV ===
==== Group A ====
Pos	Team	Pld	W	D	L	GF	GA	GD	Pts	Qualification or relegation	JCS	UNI	VIL	INT
1	JC Sport Girls	3	3	0	0	10	0	+10	9	Advance to Regional Final		3–0	4–0	
2	Universitario	3	2	0	1	5	3	+2	6					3–0
3	Villa Libertad	3	1	0	2	3	6	−3	3			0–2		3–0
4	Inter JC Ladies	3	0	0	3	0	9	−9	0		0–3			

Rules for classification: 1) Points; 2) Goal difference; 3) Goals for; 4) Fair play points; 5) Drawing of lots.

==== Group B ====
Pos	Team	Pld	W	D	L	GF	GA	GD	Pts	Qualification or relegation	CAN	CRI	PAR	TAL
1	La Cantera	3	3	0	0	10	2	+8	9	Advance to Regional Final		2–0	2–1	
2	Sporting Cristal	3	2	0	1	6	3	+3	6					4–0
3	Partizán Barranco	2	0	0	2	2	4	−2	0			1–2		
4	Talemtus Callao	2	0	0	2	1	10	−9	0		1–6		n.p.	

Rules for classification: 1) Points; 2) Goal difference; 3) Goals for; 4) Fair play points; 5) Drawing of lots.

==== Regional Final ====
Team 1	Score	Team 2
JC Sport Girls	3–2	La Cantera

=== Region V ===
==== First Round ====
Team 1	Agg.	Team 2	1st leg	2nd leg
Unión Puquiococha	–	Academia Aucayacu	2–3	–
Barrio San Francisco	–	Nueva Sociedad	0–7	–
Botica 24 Horas	–	Unión Córdova	4–1	–

==== Semifinals ====
Team 1	Agg.	Team 2	1st leg	2nd leg
Botica 24 Horas	5–7	Nueva Sociedad	3–2	2–5
Unión Córdova	1–8	Academia Aucayacu	1–3	0–5

==== Final ====
Team 1	Agg.	Team 2	1st leg	2nd leg
Nueva Sociedad	4–3	Academia Aucayacu	4–0	0–3

=== Region VI ===
Pos	Team	Pld	W	D	L	GF	GA	GD	Pts	Qualification or relegation	AYA	SOC	FUL
1	Ayacucho	2	2	0	0	9	0	+9	6	Advance to National Stage			4–0
2	Soccer Ica	2	1	0	1	5	6	−1	3		0–5		
3	Full Díaz	2	0	0	2	1	9	−8	0			1–5	

Rules for classification: 1) Points; 2) Goal difference; 3) Goals for; 4) Fair play points; 5) Drawing of lots.

=== Region VII ===
==== Group A ====
Pos	Team	Pld	W	D	L	GF	GA	GD	Pts	Qualification or relegation	MUN	EGB	BOL
1	Municipalidad de Majes	1	1	0	0	3	0	+3	3	Advance to Regional Final		3–0	
2	EGB Saetas	2	1	0	1	5	5	0	3				5–2
3	Bolívar Academia UJCM	1	0	0	1	2	5	−3	0		—		

Rules for classification: 1) Points; 2) Goal difference; 3) Goals for; 4) Fair play points; 5) Drawing of lots.

==== Group B ====
Pos	Team	Pld	W	D	L	GF	GA	GD	Pts	Qualification or relegation	SPO	DEF	UNM
1	Sporting Unión Arequipa	1	1	0	0	6	0	+6	3	Advance to Regional Final		6–0	
2	Defensor UNTAC	2	1	0	1	1	6	−5	3				1–0
3	UNAM	1	0	0	1	0	1	−1	0		—		

Rules for classification: 1) Points; 2) Goal difference; 3) Goals for; 4) Fair play points; 5) Drawing of lots.

==== Regional Final ====
Team 1	Score	Team 2
Municipalidad de Majes	0–0 (5–4 p)	Sporting Unión Arequipa

=== Region VIII ===
==== Final ====
Team 1	Score	Team 2
Real Unchiña	2–0	Hospital Santa Rosa

== National Stage ==
=== Grupo A ===
Pos	Team	Pld	W	D	L	GF	GA	GD	Pts	Qualification or relegation	JCS	BAR	JUV	AMA
1	JC Sport Girls	3	2	0	1	15	4	+11	6	Advance to Final Stage		4–0		3–3
2	FC Barça	3	1	1	1	3	6	−3	4	Advance to Final Stage			2–1	
3	Juventus Ferreñafe	3	1	0	2	3	10	−7	3		1–8			1–0
4	Amazon Sky	3	0	2	1	4	5	−1	2			1–1		

Rules for classification: 1) Points; 2) Goal difference; 3) Goals for; 4) Fair play points; 5) Drawing of lots.

=== Grupo B ===
Pos	Team	Pld	W	D	L	GF	GA	GD	Pts	Qualification or relegation	MAJ	AYA	SOC	REA
1	Municipalidad de Majes	3	2	0	1	8	4	+4	6	Advance to Final Stage		4–2		
2	Ayacucho	3	2	0	1	9	6	+3	6	Advance to Final Stage			3–1	
3	Nueva Sociedad	3	1	0	2	6	8	−2	3		0–3			5–2
4	Real Unchiña	3	1	0	2	5	10	−5	3		2–1	1–4		

Rules for classification: 1) Points; 2) Goal difference; 3) Goals for; 4) Fair play points; 5) Drawing of lots.

== Final Stage ==
=== Semifinals ===
19 December 2018	Municipalidad de Majes	2–1	FC Barça	VIDENA, Chincha
08:00	Milena Tomayconza

19 December 2018	JC Sport Girls	8–1	Ayacucho	VIDENA, Chincha
08:00	Luz Campoverde; Némesis Leal; Breccia Gonzales; Sandra Arévalo

=== Final ===
20 December 2018	Municipalidad de Majes	1–1 (7–5 p)	JC Sport Girls	VIDENA, Chincha
09:00
