= Maitté Zamorano =

Bolivian footballer (born 1981)

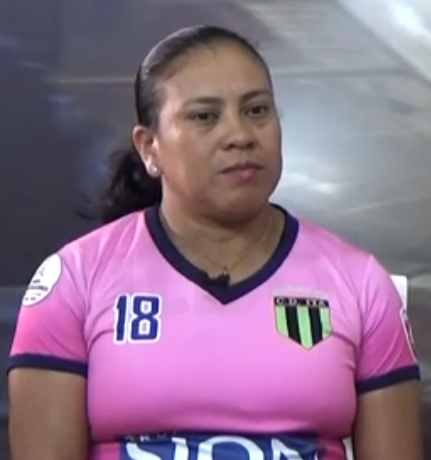
- In a 2019 interview

Personal information
- Full name: Maitté Miozotty Zamorano Cardona
- Date of birth: 6 January 1981 (age 45)
- Height: 1.59 m (5 ft 3 in)
- Position: Forward

Team information
- Current team: Deportivo ITA

Senior career*
Years	Team	Apps	(Gls)
- EnForma
- Mundo Futuro
	Santa Cruz FC (Santa Cruz)		(22)
- Deportivo ITA

International career^{‡}
	Bolivia	8+	(5+)
- * Club domestic league appearances and goals ‡ National team caps and goals as of 13 April 2018

Maitté Miozotty Zamorano Cardona (born 6 January 1981) is a Bolivian footballer who plays as a forward for Deportivo ITA and the Bolivia women's national team. She is also a former athlete, who has appeared in three editions of South American Championships in Athletics (2006, 2007 and 2009) and two editions of Bolivarian Games (2005 and 2009).

== Early life ==
Zamorano hails from the Santa Cruz Department.

== International career ==
Zamorano played for Bolivia at senior level in three Copa América Femenina editions (2003, 2006 and 2018).

=== International goals ===
Scores and results list Bolivia's goal tally first

No.	Date	Venue	Opponent	Score	Result	Competition
1	9 April 2003	Estadio Monumental "U", Lima, Peru	Peru	1–1	1–3	2003 South American Women's Football Championship
2	11 April 2003	Estadio Monumental "U", Lima, Peru	Chile	1–0	7–1	2003 South American Women's Football Championship
3	11 April 2003	Estadio Monumental "U", Lima, Peru	Chile	2–0	7–1	2003 South American Women's Football Championship
4	11 April 2003	Estadio Monumental "U", Lima, Peru	Chile	3–0	7–1	2003 South American Women's Football Championship
5	15 November 2006	Estadio José María Minella, Mar del Plata, Argentina	Peru	1–0	1–2	2006 South American Women's Football Championship

== Honours and achievements ==
=== Individual ===
- Copa Libertadores Femenina top scorer: 2013 and 2017
