= Associação Desportiva Guarujá =

Guarujá
- Full name: Associação Desportiva Guarujá
- Nickname(s): ADG; Gigante da Ilha
- Founded: 2 December 1992; 32 years ago
- Ground: Estádio Municipal Antônio Fernandes
- Capacity: 6,840
- 2018: Paulista Série A4, 38th of 40
Home colours	Away colours

The Associação Desportiva Guarujá, commonly known as Guarujá, is a currently inactive Brazilian football club based in Guarujá, São Paulo.

== History ==
The club was founded on 2 December 1992, with the help of Guarujá city hall, after the Esporte Clube Benfica folded.

== Stadium ==
The Associação Desportiva Guarujá play their home games at the Estádio Municipal Antônio Fernandes. The stadium has a maximum capacity of 6,840 people.
