= Yisela Cuesta =

Colombian footballer (born 1991)

Personal information
- Full name: Yisela Cuesta Bejarano
- Date of birth: 27 September 1991 (age 35)
- Place of birth: Bello, Colombia
- Height: 1.68 m (5 ft 6 in)
- Position: Forward

Team information
- Current team: Atlético Nacional
- Number: 11

Senior career*
| Years | Team | Apps | (Gls) |
- Formas Íntimas
| 2021 | Atlético Nacional | 12 | (4) |
| 2022 | Atlético Mineiro | 15 | (1) |
| 2023 | Ferroviária | 6 | (0) |
| 2024- | Atlético Nacional | 0 | (0) |

International career^{‡}
| 2015–2023 | Colombia | 5 | (1) |
- * Club domestic league appearances and goals as of 27 February 2023 ‡ National team caps and goals as of 00:07, 24 June 2015 (UTC)

Yisela Cuesta Bejarano (born 27 September 1991) is a Colombian professional footballer who plays as a forward for Atlético Nacional.
