= Liga Femenina de Fútbol Boliviano =

- Founded: 2005
- Country: Bolivia
- Confederation: CONMEBOL
- International cup: Copa Libertadores Femenina
- Current champions: Bolívar (1st title) (2026)
- Current: 2026 season

Logo of the Liga Femenina del Fútbol Boliviano

The Bolivian women's football championship (Spanish: Campeonato Nacional de clubes de Fútbol de femenino) is the national competition for women's football in Bolivia. The winner qualifies for the Copa Libertadores de Fútbol Femenino, the South American Champions League. The competition is organised by the Bolivian Football Federation.

== History ==
The national championship was established in 2005, regional championships were existent earlier.

== Format ==
The national championship is played late each year. Participating are the winners of the regional leagues that year.

== List of champions ==
Below is the list of all champions:

- (In bracket, title count):

Ed.	Season	Champion	Runner-up
Campeonato Nacional (2005–2023)
1	2005	EnForma Santa Cruz (1)	Atlético Fernández
2	2006	EnForma Santa Cruz (2)	Atlético Fernández
3	2007	EnForma Santa Cruz (3)	Blooming
4	2008	EnForma Santa Cruz (4)	Blooming
5	2009	EnForma Santa Cruz (5)	Real Santa Cruz
6	2010	Florida (1)	EnForma Santa Cruz
7	2011	Gerimex (1)	Blooming
8	2012	Universidad de Santa Cruz (1)	Santa Cruz FC
9	2013	Mundo Futuro (1)	Universidad de Santa Cruz
10	2014	Mundo Futuro (2)	Aurora
11	2015	San Martín de Porres (1)	Deportivo ITA
12	2016	San Martín de Porres (2)	Deportivo ITA
13	2017	Deportivo ITA (6)	San Simón
14	2018	Deportivo ITA (7)	San Martin de Porres
15	2019	Mundo Futuro (3)	San Martin de Porres
16	2020	Deportivo Trópico (1)	Universidad de Santa Cruz
17	2021	Real Tomayapo (1)	ABB
18	2022	Always Ready (1)	Astor FC
19	2023	Always Ready (2)	Astor FC
Liga Nacional (2024–present)
20	2024	Always Ready (3)	Astor FC
21	2025	Always Ready (4)	Astor FC
22	2026	Bolívar (1)	Astor FC

Note: Gerimex was renamed Santa Cruz FC in 2012.

== Titles by club ==
Rank	Club	Titles	Runners-up	Seasons won	Seasons runner-up
1	EnForma Santa Cruz / Deportivo ITA	7	3	2005, 2006, 2007, 2008, 2009, 2017, 2018	2010, 2015, 2016
2	Always Ready	4	—	2022, 2023, 2024, 2025	—
3	Mundo Futuro	3	—	2013, 2014, 2019	—
4	San Martín de Porres	2	2	2015, 2016	2018, 2019
5	Universidad de Santa Cruz	1	2	2012	2013, 2020
5	Gerimex	1	1	2011	2012
5	Bolívar	1	—	2026	—
5	Florida	1	—	2010	—
5	Deportivo Trópico	1	—	2020	—
5	Real Tomayapo	1	—	2021	—
