= Caracas F.C. (women) =

Venezuelan football club

Caracas
- Full name: Caracas Fútbol Club Femenino
- Nickname: Los Rojos del Ávila (The Reds from Ávila)
- Founded: 12 December 1967; 58 years ago
- Ground: Cocodrilos Sports Park
- Capacity: 3,500
- Chairman: Phillip Valentiner
- Manager: Gimino Tropiano
- League: Liga FUTVE Femenina
- Website: http://www.caracasfutbolclub.com
Home colours	Away colours	Third colours

Caracas Fútbol Club Femenino is a Venezuelan women's football team based in Caracas. The club is the female section of Caracas F.C. They have won a record seven Liga FUTVE Femenina titles.

== History ==
Caracas F.C. was originally founded on 12 December 1967 at the initiative of a group of fans led by José León Beracasa, Luis Ignacio Sanglade, Ángel Román, Diógenes Álvarez, Luis Abad Obregón and José Abad Obregón, gathered in the "Quinta Rebeca" located in the San Román neighborhood of Caracas. The club was created due to the fact that there was no soccer team in the capital with the name Caracas, since at that time most of the existing capital teams had representative names of the European colonies that arrived in Venezuela after the World War II, specifically from Spain, Italy and Portugal. This is how the idea matured and later the team name was registered on 27 December 1967. On 2 January 1968 the board of directors was formed as follows: Ángel Román as president, Diógenes Álvarez as vice president, Luis Abad Obregón as Secretary, José León Beracasa as Treasurer and finally Luis Ignacio Sanglade and José Abad Obregón as Members, later the record is published in the Official Gazette on 29 January 1968 (at the time of foundation the team had a Subscribed Capital of Bs. 1,000) and had their administrative headquarters in La Florida neighborhood.

== Honours ==
- Liga FUTVE Femenina

Champions (7): 2009, 2009–10, 2011, 2012, 2014, 2023, 2026

- Copa Venezuela de Fútbol Femenino

Winners (2): 2009, 2010
