= Liga FUTVE Femenina =

- Founded: 2004
- Country: Venezuela
- Confederation: CONMEBOL
- Divisions: 1
- Number of clubs: 12
- Level on pyramid: 1
- Domestic cup: Copa Venezuela
- International cup: Copa Libertadores de Fútbol Femenino
- Current champions: Caracas (2026)
- Most championships: Caracas (7)
- Current: 2026

The Primera División Femenina officially named Liga FUTVE Femenina is the top level league competition for women's football in Venezuela. The winner qualifies for the Copa Libertadores de Fútbol Femenino, the South American Champions League. The competition is organised by the Venezuelan Football Federation. It was established in 2017, with the league was made into a semi-professional one, and under the control of the Women's Football Commission.

== History ==
A national amateur league was formed in 2000. In the Liga Amateur de Fútbol Femenino (LAFF) mostly University teams were playing. UCAB (Universidad Católica Andrés Bello) from Caracas won three of the four editions. In 2003/04 the national league was established. It was called the Primera División Femenina until 2016, when it was decided that women's footballers will be received with more adequate means to improve their football life, thus leading to the creation of the Super League in 2017. The newly established Super League will allow clubs to have professional contracts for female footballers and greater insurance, though it is not mandatory due to its semi-professional status.

== Format ==
In the 2011 season there were 11 teams in two divisions, an Eastern and Western one. The champion qualified for the Copa Libertadores. The 2012/13 season was played in Apertura and Clausura format. Apertura from September to December and Clausura from December to June.

In 2016 the final stage consisted of a hexagonal with six teams each playing each other twice. The two leading teams played for the championship in a two leg match.

In 2017 the national FA changed the league to a semi-professional one. Clubs now need a license, professional staff and pay their players.

== List of champions ==
Below is the list of champions. Caracas FC have been national champion six times, the most of any team.

- (In bracket, title count):

Ed.	Season	Champion	Runner-up
Liga Nacional Femenina (2004–2016)
1	2004	Estudiantes de Mérida (1)	Estudiantes de Guárico
2	2005	Estudiantes de Mérida (2)	UCAB Spirit
3	2006	UCAB Spirit (1)	Estudiantes de Mérida
4	2007	Zulia (1)	UCAB Spirit
5	2008	Fundemer (1)	— (Note: Since Fundemer won both the Apertura and Clausura tournaments, no playoff games were played and Fundemer were declared as season champions.)
6	2009	Caracas (1)	Comunidad Cristiana Anzoátegui
7	2010	Caracas (2)	Estudiantes de Guárico
8	2011	Caracas (3)	Estudiantes de Guárico
9	2012	Caracas (4)	Estudiantes de Guárico
10	2013	Estudiantes de Guárico (1)	Caracas
11	2014	Caracas (5)	Estudiantes de Guárico
12	2015	Estudiantes de Guárico (2)	— (Note: Since Estudiantes de Guárico won both the Apertura and Clausura tournaments, no playoff games were played and Estudiantes were declared as season champions.)
13	2016	Estudiantes de Guárico (3)	Flor de Patria
Superliga Femenina (2017–2021)
14	2017	Estudiantes de Guárico (4)	Flor de Patria
15	2018	Flor de Patria (1)	Deportivo Táchira
16	2019	Estudiantes de Caracas (1)	Flor de Patria
–	2020	Canceled due to the COVID-19 pandemic.	
–	2021	Canceled due to the COVID-19 pandemic.	
Liga FUTVE Femenina (2022–present)
17	2022	Deportivo Lara (1)	Madeira Club Lara
18	2023	Caracas (6)	ADIFFEM
19	2024	ADIFFEM (1)	Marítimo
20	2025	ADIFFEM (2)	Deportivo Táchira
21	2026	Caracas (7)	Academia Puerto Cabello

== Titles by club ==
Rank	Club	Titles	Runner-up	Winning years	Runners-up years
1	Caracas	7	1	2009, 2010, 2011, 2012, 2014, 2023, 2026	2013
2	Estudiantes de Guárico	4	5	2013, 2015, 2016, 2017	2004, 2010, 2011, 2012, 2014
3	Estudiantes de Mérida	2	1	2004, 2005	2006
3	ADIFFEM	2	1	2024, 2025	2023
4	Flor de Patria	1	3	2018	2016, 2017, 2019
4	UCAB Spirit	1	2	2006	2005, 2007
4	Deportivo Lara	1	—	2022	—
4	Estudiantes de Caracas	1	—	2019	—
4	Fundemer	1	—	2008	—
4	Zulia	1	—	2007	—

== National Cups ==
Due to the COVID-19 pandemic, there was no first division tournament in 2020 and 2021. However, extraordinary tournaments were held, in which the champions qualified for the Copa Libertadores Femenina.

Season	Champion	Runner-up	Award
2020 Invitacional	Atlético Sport (1)	Caracas	Qualified for 2020 Copa Libertadores Femenina
2021 Adecuación	Yaracuyanos (1)	Caracas	Qualified for 2021 Copa Libertadores Femenina

== Parallel tournaments ==
The Liga Nacional Femenina served as the First Division until 2016, as in 2017 it was replaced by the Superliga Femenina. However, it continued organizing its tournament in parallel with the Superliga until 2019.

Season	Champion	Runner-up
Liga Nacional Femenina
2017	Deportivo Lara	—
2018	Arroceros de Calabozo	Dynamo Puerto
2019	Deportivo Petare	—
Defunct Tournament

== Half-year / Short tournaments ==
=== Apertura and Clausura seasons ===
Season		Champion	Runner-up
Liga Nacional Femenina (2004–2019)
2005	Apertura	Estudiantes de Mérida	Caracas
2005	Clausura	UCAB Spirit	Estudiantes de Mérida
2006	Apertura	Estudiantes de Mérida	UCAB Spirit
2006	Clausura	UCAB Spirit	Estudiantes de Guárico
2007	Apertura	UCAB Spirit	Estudiantes de Guárico
2007	Clausura	Zulia	Comunidad Cristiana Anzoátegui
2008	Apertura	Fundemer	Zulia
2008	Clausura	Fundemer	Caracas
2013	Apertura	Estudiantes de Guárico	Caracas
2013	Clausura	Estudiantes de Guárico	Caracas
2014	Apertura	Caracas	Estudiantes de Guárico
2014	Clausura	Estudiantes de Guárico	Deportivo Anzoátegui
2015	Apertura	Estudiantes de Guárico	Deportivo Anzoátegui
2015	Clausura	Estudiantes de Guárico	Caracas
2016	Apertura	Estudiantes de Guárico	Deportivo Anzoátegui
2016	Clausura	Flor de Patria	Caracas
2017	Apertura	Deportivo Lara	Academia Puerto Cabello
2017	Clausura	Deportivo Lara	Real Amistad
2018	Apertura	Dynamo Puerto	Arroceros de Calabozo
2018	Clausura	Arroceros de Calabozo	Casa Portuguesa
2019	Apertura	Deportivo Petare	Yaracuyanos
2019	Clausura	Deportivo Petare	Dynamo Puerto
