= FBC White Star =

Peruvian football club

White Star
- Full name: Foot Ball Club White Star
- Nickname(s): Estrella Solitaria; Tiznados
- Founded: August 15, 1917
- Ground: Estadio Mariano Melgar, Arequipa
- Capacity: 20,000
- League: Copa Perú
Home colours	Away colours

FBC White Star are a Peruvian football club based in Arequipa, Arequipa Region. The women's football department of the club won the national league in 2009, and competed in that season's Copa Libertadores.

== History ==
The club is recognized in Arequipa as one of the five "big" teams together with FBC Piérola, Sportivo Huracán, FBC Melgar and FBC Aurora, despite they being the only one of these that has failed to participate in the First Division.

The women's football department of the club won the Campeonato Nacional de Fútbol Femenino in 2009, after beating Estudiantes Universitarios de Cusco 3–2 in the final, and thus qualifying to compete in that year's Copa Libertadores.

== Rivalries ==
FBC White Star has had a long-standing rivalry with Melgar, Aurora, Piérola, and Sportivo Huracán.

== Honours ==
=== National ===
- Liga Provincial de Arequipa:

Winners (1): 1953
Runner-up (3): 1963, 2011. 2019

- Liga Distrital de Arequipa:

Winners (3): 1987, 2011, 2013
Runner-up (4): 2009, 2010, 2016, 2019

=== Women's football ===
- Campeonato Nacional de Fútbol Femenino: 1

Winners (1): 2009

== See also ==
- List of football clubs in Peru
- Peruvian football league system
