= JC Sport Girls =

- League: Campeonato Peruano
- 2017: 1st

JC Sport Girls are a Peruvian women's football club based in Lima, The women's football department of the club won the national league in 2011, and competed in that season's Copa Libertadores.

As there is no national league so far, the national championship is contested by the regional league winners. Sport Girls play in the Metropolitan league, the Lima region. There are two seasons played each year, the Apertura and Clausura. The winner of those, if not the same team, play a match for the Metropolitan title, that qualifies for next years national championship. In 2010 they won both Apertura and Clausura. In 2011 they won the Apertura.

== Honours ==
- Metropolitan league: 2010, 2012

Type	Competition	Titles	Runner-up	Winning years	Runner-up years
National (League)	Primera División Femenina	6	1	2004, 2006, 2010, 2011, 2012, 2017	2018
Regional (League)	Región IV	6	1	2009, 2010, 2011, 2012, 2017, 2018	2013
