= Soco =

Soco, SOCO, or SoCo may refer to:

== Organizations ==
- Saskatchewan Opportunities Corporation, a provincial crown corporation in Saskatchewan, Canada
- Society for Community Organization, a non-governmental and human rights advocacy group in Hong Kong
- SOCO International, an oil and gas exploration and production company, headquartered in London
- SoCo Music Project, a community music organization based in Southampton, England

== Places ==
- South Coast (Massachusetts), the coast of Massachusetts and Rhode Island
- Soco Gap, a mountain pass in North Carolina, United States
- Soco River, Dominican Republic
- Socos District, Huamanga province, Peru
- South Congress, Austin, Texas, United States
- Sokho, an ancient town in Israel or the West Bank

== Other uses ==
- S.O.C.O.: Scene of the Crime Operatives, a reality public service program in the Philippines
- "Soco" (song), by Starboy, featuring Wizkid, Terri, Spotless and Ceeza Milli
- Glenn Soco, Filipino businessman and politician
- Chaco socos, a spider of family Nemesiidae
- Scenes of crime officer, an officer who gathers forensic evidence for the British police
- Scene of the Crime Operations, the forensic arm of the Philippine National Police
- Soco Monument, a monument in East Java, Indonesia
- Something Corporate, an American rock band.
- Southern Comfort, an American liqueur.
