= Huamanga province =

Coordinates: 13°10′12″S 74°13′12″W

Huamanga
- Province
- Flag Coat of arms

- Location of Huamanga in the Ayacucho Region
- Country: Peru
- Region: Ayacucho
- Capital: Ayacucho

Government
  - Mayor: uan Carlos Arango Claudio

Area
  - Total: 2,981.37 km^{2} (1,151.11 sq mi)

Population
  - Total: 282,194
  - Density: 94.6525/km^{2} (245.149/sq mi)
- Website: Official website

Huamanga, sometimes informally Ayacucho, is a province in the northern part of the Ayacucho Region in Peru. The capital of the province is the city of Ayacucho.

== Political division ==
The province covers 2,981.3 square kilometres (1,151.1 sq mi) and is divided into fifteen districts:

- Ayacucho (Ayacucho)
- Acocro (Acocro)
- Acos Vinchos (Acos Vinchos)
- Carmen Alto (Carmen Alto)
- Chiara (Chiara)
- Jesús Nazareno (Las Nazarenas)
- Ocros (Ocros)
- Pacaycasa (Pacaycasa)
- Quinua (Quinua)
- San José de Ticllas (Ticllas)
- San Juan Bautista (San Juan Bautista)
- Santiago de Pischa (San Pedro de Cachi)
- Socos (Socos)
- Tambillo (Tambillo)
- Vinchos (Vinchos)
- Andrés Avelino Cáceres Dorregaray (Jardín)

== Geography ==
One of the highest mountains of the province is Yanapatira at approximately 5,000 m (16,000 ft). Other mountains are listed below:

- Allqa Suntu
- Ankap Wachanan
- Anta Q'asa
- Aqu Arma
- Artisa
- Atuq Wachanqa
- Challwa Q'asa
- Chawpi Urqu
- Chupa Urqu
- Chuqi Waqra
- Ch'akiqucha
- Ch'iptap Wasin
- Hapu Punta
- Hatun Munti
- Hatun Pata
- Hatun Tarayuq
- Hatun Usnu
- Hatun P’ukru
- Ichhu Pampa
- Illayuq
- Illachayuq
- Kampanayuq Urqu
- Kinwa Punta
- Kuntur Kunka
- Kuntur Pata
- Kuntur Sinqa
- Maray Urqu
- Pichqa Pukyu
- Qillwaqucha
- Qiwlla Pata
- Q’illu Urqu
- Ruphasqa
- Rurun Willka
- Salla Punta
- Saywa Muqu
- Tarukayuq
- Tarwiyuq
- Uma Urqu
- Umutu Q'asa
- Urqu Punta
- Utuluyuq
- Waman Pirqa
- Waman Wachana
- Wanakawri
- Watana
- Wawsiyuq
- Wayllacha
- Yana Mach’ay
- Yana Phiruru
- Yana Yana
- Yuraq Qaqa

== Ethnic groups ==
The people in the province are mainly indigenous citizens of Quechua descent. Quechua is the language which the majority of the population (50.37%) learnt to speak in childhood, 49.31% of the residents started speaking using the Spanish language and 0.11 % using Aymara (2007 Peru Census).

== See also ==
- Battle of Ayacucho
- Hatun Usnu
- Kachimayu
- Marayniyuq
- Pampas de Ayacucho Historical Sanctuary
- Qunchupata
- Wichqana
