= Kunturkunka =

Mountain in Peru

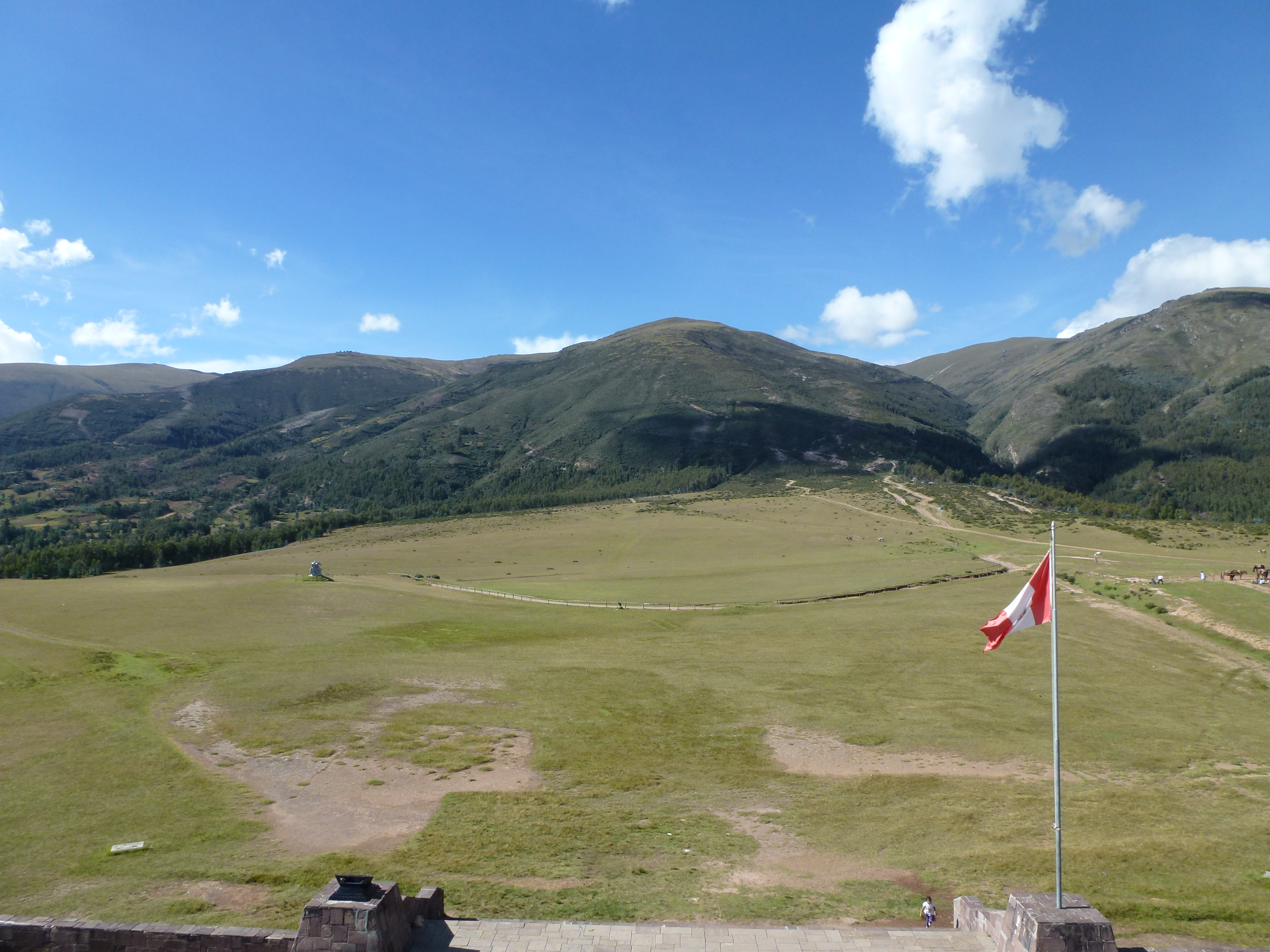
- Kunturkunka as seen from the obelisk at Pampa de Quinua

Highest point
- Coordinates: 13°00′28.3″S 74°06′3.5″W

Geography
- Location within Peru
- Location: Peru, Ayacucho Region, Huamanga Province
- Parent range: Andes

Kunturkunka (Quechua kuntur condor, kunka throat, gullet, neck, voice, Hispanicized spelling Condorcunca) is a mountain in the Andes of Peru. It is located in the Ayacucho Region, Huamanga Province, Quinua District. Kunturkunka lies southwest of the mountain Saraqucha Q'asa ("maize lake mountain pass"), Hispanicized Saracochajasa) at the plain named Pampa de Quinua or Pampa de Ayacucho. This is where the Battle of Ayacucho took place. Today it is a protected area known as Pampa de Ayacucho Historical Sanctuary.
