= Quinua, Peru =

Quinua Kinwa
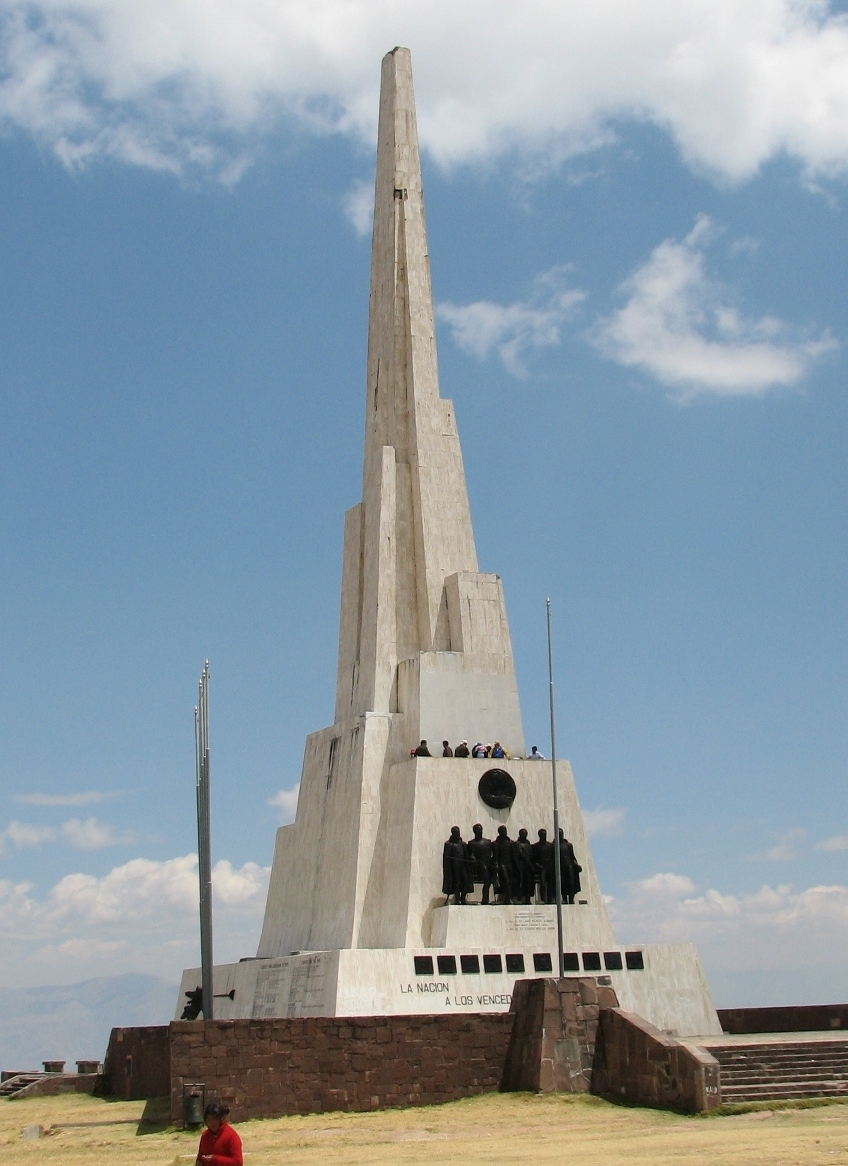
- Obelisk on the pampa near Quinua commemorating the Battle of Ayacucho

- Location within Peru
- Coordinates: 13°03′15″S 74°08′21″W
- Country: Peru
- Region: Ayacucho
- Province: Huamanga
- District: Quinua District
- Elevation: 3,300 m (10,800 ft)
- Time zone: UTC-5 (PET)
  - Summer (DST): UTC-5 (PET)

Quinua is a small town in Quinua District in the province of Huamanga, in Peru's central highland department of Ayacucho, 37 km (23 mi) from the city of Huamanga (Ayacucho), at an altitude of 3,300 meters (10,830 ft), which today serves as the administrative capital of the district of the same name. It is noted as the site of the 1824 Battle of Ayacucho.

Long known for its pottery, and serving as a stop between the larger towns of Huamanga and Huanta and the jungles of San Miguel province, Quinua received a boost to its primarily agricultural subsistence with the celebration of the sesquicentennial of the Battle of Ayacucho in 1974. In preparation for the ceremonies dedicating a 44-meter (144 ft) obelisk commemorating the 44-year struggle for independence, a paved roadway was built linking Quinua and Huamanga, thereby shortening to less than an hour what had until then been a half-day trip.

After the long-lasting fight between the Peruvian state and the Shining Path guerrilla movement, the town capitalized on its historic location, garnering a share of Ayacucho's tourism market. Among the attractions offered the more than 10,000 who visit each year are the battlefield and the commemorative obelisk, a historical museum located in the house where the Act of Capitulation was signed, the town traditional architecture, and traditional Ayacucho foods prepared and served in country setting. Pottery is now the town's main industry, with 70% of its economically active population engaged in producing or selling the town's famous pottery.

== Climate ==
Climate data for La Quinua, elevation 3,215 m (10,548 ft), (1991–2020)
Month	Jan	Feb	Mar	Apr	May	Jun	Jul	Aug	Sep	Oct	Nov	Dec	Year
Mean daily maximum °C (°F)	18.6 (65.5)	18.1 (64.6)	17.8 (64.0)	18.4 (65.1)	18.7 (65.7)	18.1 (64.6)	17.8 (64.0)	18.7 (65.7)	19.2 (66.6)	19.6 (67.3)	20.6 (69.1)	19.0 (66.2)	18.7 (65.7)
Mean daily minimum °C (°F)	7.1 (44.8)	7.1 (44.8)	7.0 (44.6)	6.5 (43.7)	5.3 (41.5)	4.0 (39.2)	3.4 (38.1)	4.0 (39.2)	5.7 (42.3)	6.6 (43.9)	6.8 (44.2)	6.7 (44.1)	5.9 (42.5)
Average precipitation mm (inches)	129.3 (5.09)	149.3 (5.88)	123.2 (4.85)	41.7 (1.64)	20.5 (0.81)	5.8 (0.23)	12.5 (0.49)	12.9 (0.51)	34.5 (1.36)	50.7 (2.00)	62.7 (2.47)	112.7 (4.44)	755.8 (29.77)
Source: National Meteorology and Hydrology Service of Peru

== See also ==
- Kunturkunka
- Pampas de Ayacucho Historical Sanctuary
