= Ayacucho Declaration =

On December 9, 1974, the sesquicentennial celebration of the Battle of Ayacucho, the site of Simón Bolívar's final victory over Spain, eight Hispanic American nations stated their intention to consider arms limitations. Representatives from Argentina, Bolivia, Chile, Colombia, Ecuador, Panama, Peru, and Venezuela jointly declared the need to "create conditions which permit effective limitation of armaments and put an end to their acquisition for offensive military purposes, in order to dedicate all possible resources to economic development".

By 1975, the declaration's signers had reached a consensus on prohibiting a range of weapons and equipment, including nuclear, biological, and chemical weapons; ballistic missiles; aircraft carriers; cruisers; and nuclear submarines. Colombia also remained adamant in opposing the introduction of strategic missiles into the region—a move favored by neighboring Venezuela—as well as all models of bomber aircraft.

In September 1980, Colombia joined with three of the declaration's original signers plus Costa Rica in agreeing upon the Charter of Conduct, which reaffirmed support for the peaceful resolution of conflicts and for the principles of the 1974 declaration.
