= Qunchupata, Ayacucho =

Archaeological site in Peru

Coordinates: 13.1564°S 74.2077°W

Qunchupata
- Location within Peru
- Location: Peru, Ayacucho Region
- Region: Andes

Site notes
- Area: 30.492,28 square metres

Designations
- Designation: National Cultural Heritage of Peru, 1988

Qunchupata (Quechua qunchu muddy, pata step, bank of a river, "muddy step" or "muddy bank", hispanicized spelling Conchopata, also Qonchopata) is an archaeological zone in Peru. It is located in the Ayacucho Region, Huamanga Province, Ayacucho District. The site was declared a National Cultural Heritage (Patrimonio Cultural) of Peru by Resolución Directional Nacional No. 458-98-INC on December 15, 1998.
