= Santiago de Pischa District =

Coordinates: 13.0852°S 74.3925°W

Santiago de Pischa
- District
- Interactive map of Santiago de Pischa
- Country: Peru
- Region: Ayacucho
- Province: Huamanga
- Capital: San Pedro de Cachi

Government
  - Mayor: Pelayo Santiago Pareja

Area
  - Total: 114.94 km^{2} (44.38 sq mi)
- Elevation: 3,188 m (10,459 ft)

Population (2005 census)
  - Total: 1,643
  - Density: 14.29/km^{2} (37.02/sq mi)
- Time zone: UTC-5 (PET)
- UBIGEO: 050111

Santiago de Pischa District is one of fifteen districts of the province Huamanga in Peru.

== Ethnic groups ==
The people in the district are mainly indigenous citizens of Quechua descent. Quechua is the language which the majority of the population (76.33%) learnt to speak in childhood, 23.16% of the residents started speaking using the Spanish language (2007 Peru Census).

== Climate ==
Climate data for San Pedro de Cachi, Santiago de Pischa, elevation 3,247 m (10,653 ft), (1991–2020)
| Month | Jan | Feb | Mar | Apr | May | Jun | Jul | Aug | Sep | Oct | Nov | Dec | Year |
|---|---|---|---|---|---|---|---|---|---|---|---|---|---|
| Mean daily maximum °C (°F) | 20.6 (69.1) | 19.9 (67.8) | 19.9 (67.8) | 21.0 (69.8) | 21.7 (71.1) | 21.4 (70.5) | 21.2 (70.2) | 22.0 (71.6) | 22.0 (71.6) | 22.5 (72.5) | 23.1 (73.6) | 21.2 (70.2) | 21.4 (70.5) |
| Mean daily minimum °C (°F) | 9.3 (48.7) | 9.3 (48.7) | 9.2 (48.6) | 8.2 (46.8) | 6.8 (44.2) | 5.9 (42.6) | 5.5 (41.9) | 6.2 (43.2) | 7.8 (46.0) | 8.7 (47.7) | 9.0 (48.2) | 9.2 (48.6) | 7.9 (46.3) |
| Average precipitation mm (inches) | 139.6 (5.50) | 137.5 (5.41) | 105.3 (4.15) | 42.2 (1.66) | 17.8 (0.70) | 4.9 (0.19) | 11.0 (0.43) | 11.1 (0.44) | 18.6 (0.73) | 40.0 (1.57) | 45.4 (1.79) | 109.4 (4.31) | 682.8 (26.88) |
Source: National Meteorology and Hydrology Service of Peru

== See also ==
- Kachimayu
