= Wichqana =

Archaeological site in Peru

- Interactive map of Wichqana
- 13°08′00″S 74°12′40″W
- Location: Peru, Ayacucho Region
- Region: Andes

Wichqana (Quechua, also spelled Huichcana, Huichccana) is an archaeological site in Peru. It is located in the Ayacucho Region, Huamanga Province, Ayacucho District. Wichqana lies on a western slope of Uma Urqu north of Ayacucho. Wichqana was during the early horizon time period which is one of the seven time periods used for Peruvian chronological construction.

== Culture ==
Wichqana was active from around 1200-800 BC during the Kishka Pata Period and was a ceremonial center on the central highlands of Peru, on the Ayacucho Valley. The ceremonial center was similar to Cerro Secchin and the centers were built in a U-shape of alternating sized stones. The ceremonial center also included some Chavinoid features which shows that the Wichqana people were practicing some form of the Chavionoid culture. The Wichqana have some of the Chavinoid culture because during this time period the styles and derivatives of the Chavin were thriving. On the site there were semicircle temple structures on artificial mounds which indicates some sort of priestly figure was used. Also found on the Wichqana site, 5 skulls of women were found buried which indicates the importance of sacrifices. When these severed heads were found, there were cobblestone of semi-ciricles found above them.

The pottery that was found on the site was typical and basic. The pottery had little to no decoration but were typically brown, thin, with a pebble polish.

== Economy ==
The main source of trade and production for the Wichqana people included agriculture (potatoes, ocas, ullucus, maca, etc.) and pastoralism and the two main animals that were used for herding were llamas and alpacas. Along with agriculture and herding, hunting was also a large part of the economy which included common animals such as deer, rodents, and birds. It had been confirmed that most of the trading was done along the northern part of the territory during the earlier period, then later moving more toward the coastal area during the later years.
