= San José de Ticllas District =

Coordinates: 13.1324°S 74.3333°W

San José de Ticllas Tiklla(s)
- District
- Interactive map of San José de Ticllas
- Country: Peru
- Region: Ayacucho
- Province: Huamanga
- Founded: June 20, 1955
- Capital: Ticllas

Government
  - Mayor: Edgar Sulca León

Area
  - Total: 64.34 km^{2} (24.84 sq mi)
- Elevation: 3,268 m (10,722 ft)

Population (2005 census)
  - Total: 2,325
  - Density: 36.14/km^{2} (93.59/sq mi)
- Time zone: UTC-5 (PET)
- UBIGEO: 050109

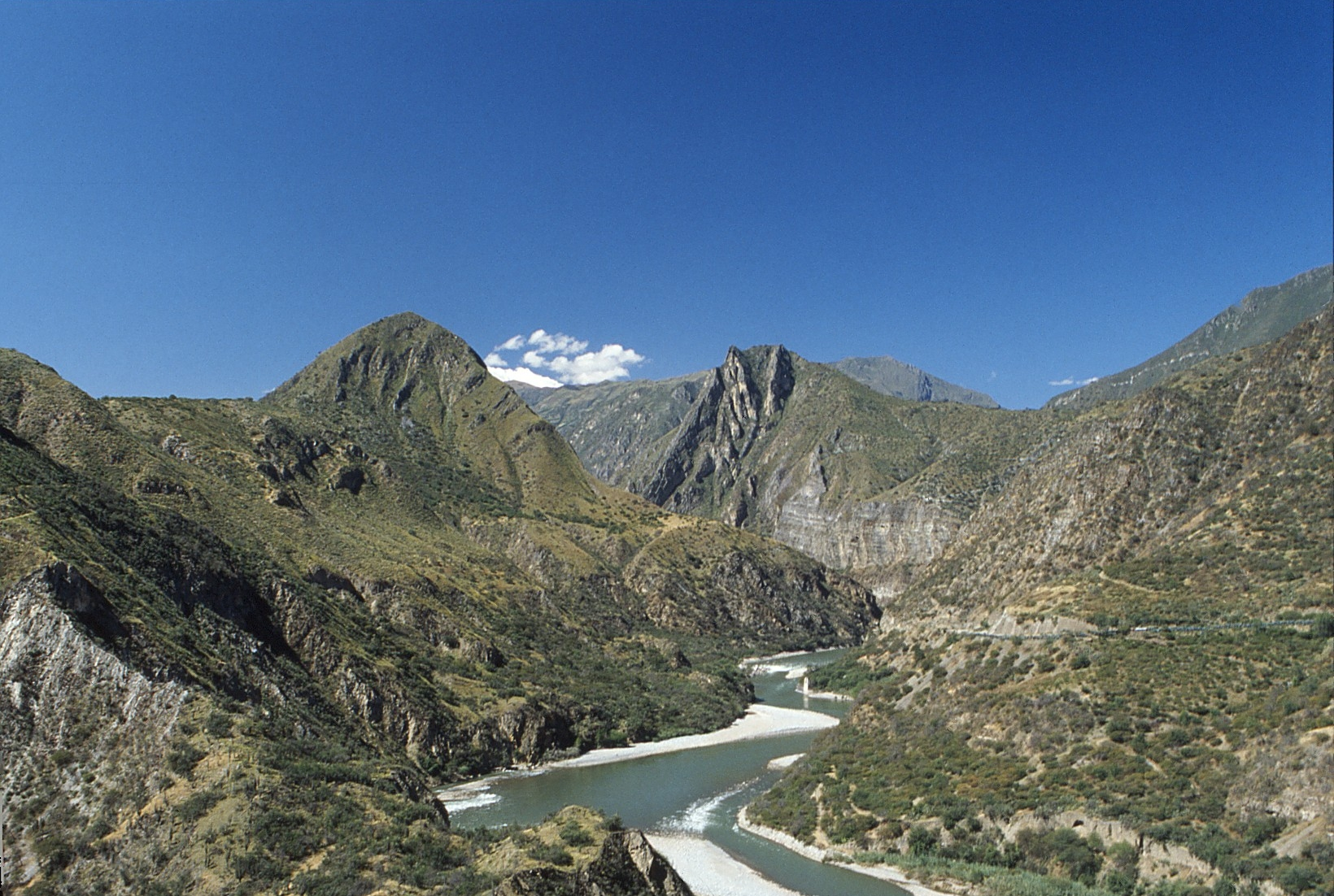

San José de Ticllas District is one of fifteen districts of the province Huamanga in Peru.

== Ethnic groups ==
The people in the district are mainly indigenous citizens of Quechua descent. Quechua is the language which the majority of the population (83.59%) learnt to speak in childhood, 16.28% of the residents started speaking using the Spanish language (2007 Peru Census).
