= Hatun Usnu =

Archaeological site in Peru

- Location within Peru
- 13.4252°S 74.1524°W
- Location: Peru, Ayacucho Region
- Region: Andes

Hatun Usnu (Quechua hatun big, usnu altar; a special platform for important celebrations, "big usnu", also known as Qatun Ushno de Toccto) is an archaeological site in Peru on a mountain of the same name (Jatunhosno). It is located in the Ayacucho Region, Huamanga Province, Chiara District.
