= Vinchos District =

Coordinates: 13.2420°S 74.3543°W

Vinchos Winchu
- District
- Interactive map of Vinchos
- Country: Peru
- Region: Ayacucho
- Province: Huamanga
- Founded: January 2, 1857
- Capital: Vinchos

Government
  - Mayor: Paulino Ore Flores

Area
  - Total: 955.13 km^{2} (368.78 sq mi)
- Elevation: 3,150 m (10,330 ft)

Population (2005 census)
  - Total: 16,312
  - Density: 17.078/km^{2} (44.233/sq mi)
- Time zone: UTC-5 (PET)
- UBIGEO: 050114

Vinchos District is one of fifteen districts of the province of Huamanga in Peru.

== Ethnic groups ==
The people in the district are mainly indigenous citizens of Quechua descent. Quechua is the language which the majority of the population (97.08%) learnt to speak in childhood, 2.71% of the residents started speaking using the Spanish language (2007 Peru Census).

== Geography ==
One of the highest mountains of the district is Yanapatira at approximately 5,000 m (16,000 ft) on the western border. Other mountains are listed below:

- Aqu Arma
- Artisa
- Chupa Urqu
- Ch’iptap Wasin
- Hapu Punta
- Hatun Pata
- Hatun P’ukru
- Illayuq
- Illachayuq
- Kinwa Punta
- Kuntur Pata
- Kuntur Sinqa
- Maray Urqu
- Qillwaqucha
- Q’illu Urqu
- Ruphasqa
- Salla Punta
- Tarukayuq
- Utuluyuq
- Waman Wachana
- Wanakawri
- Watana
- Wayllacha
- Yana Mach’ay
- Yana Yana
- Yuraq Qaqa
