= Tambillo District =

Coordinates: 13.1946°S 74.1109°W

Tambillo
- District
- Interactive map of Tambillo
- Country: Peru
- Region: Ayacucho
- Province: Huamanga
- Capital: Tambillo

Government
  - Mayor: Arturo Quispe Solorzano

Area
  - Total: 184.45 km^{2} (71.22 sq mi)
- Elevation: 3,080 m (10,100 ft)

Population (2005 census)
  - Total: 4,939
  - Density: 26.78/km^{2} (69.35/sq mi)
- Time zone: UTC-5 (PET)
- UBIGEO: 050113

Tambillo District is one of fifteen districts of the province Huamanga in Peru.

== Ethnic groups ==
The people in the district are mainly indigenous citizens of Quechua descent. Quechua is the language which the majority of the population (85.33%) learnt to speak in childhood, 14.46% of the residents started speaking using the Spanish language (2007 Peru Census).
