= Acos Vinchos District =

Coordinates: 13.1142°S 74.1046°W

Acos Vinchos
- District
- Interactive map of Acos Vinchos
- Country: Peru
- Region: Ayacucho
- Province: Huamanga
- Capital: Acos Vinchos

Government
  - Mayor: Flor Rosmeri Perez Barreto

Area
  - Total: 152.28 km^{2} (58.80 sq mi)
- Elevation: 2,848 m (9,344 ft)

Population (2005 census)
  - Total: 4,882
  - Density: 32.06/km^{2} (83.03/sq mi)
- Time zone: UTC-5 (PET)
- UBIGEO: 050103

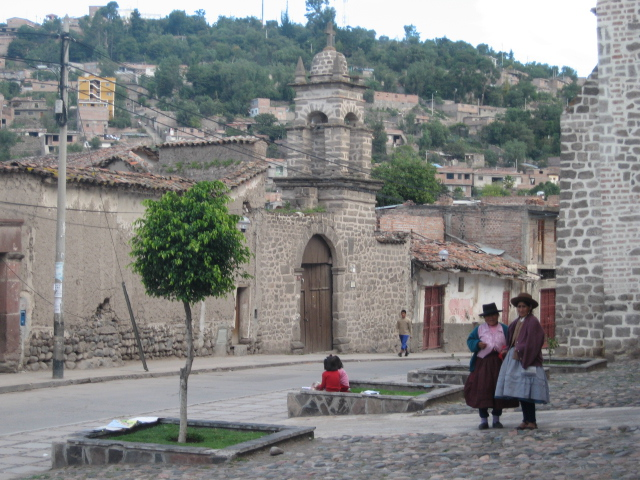
People image

Acos Vinchos District is one of fifteen districts of the province Huamanga in Peru.

== Ethnic groups ==
The people in the district are mainly indigenous citizens of Quechua descent. Quechua is the language which the majority of the population (93.01%) learnt to speak in childhood, 6.78% of the residents started speaking using the Spanish language (2007 Peru Census).
