= Jesús Nazareno District =

Coordinates: 13.1554°S 74.2180°W

Jesús Nazareno
- District
- Interactive map of Jesús Nazareno
- Country: Peru
- Region: Ayacucho
- Province: Huamanga
- Founded: June 6, 2000
- Capital: Las Nazarenas

Government
  - Mayor: Panfilo Amilcar Huancahuari Tueros

Area
  - Total: 17.8 km^{2} (6.9 sq mi)
- Elevation: 2,780 m (9,120 ft)

Population (2005 census)
  - Total: 15,248
  - Density: 857/km^{2} (2,220/sq mi)
- Time zone: UTC-5 (PET)
- UBIGEO: 050115

Jesús Nazareno District is one of fifteen districts of the province Huamanga in Peru.
