= Carmen Alto District =

Coordinates: 13.1758°S 74.2264°W

Carmen Alto
- District
- Interactive map of Carmen Alto
- Country: Peru
- Region: Ayacucho
- Province: Huamanga
- Founded: September 6, 1920
- Capital: Carmen Alto

Government
  - Mayor: Revelino Huamani Rodriguez

Area
  - Total: 19.33 km^{2} (7.46 sq mi)
- Elevation: 2,800 m (9,200 ft)

Population (2005 census)
  - Total: 16,080
  - Density: 831.9/km^{2} (2,155/sq mi)
- Time zone: UTC-5 (PET)
- UBIGEO: 050104

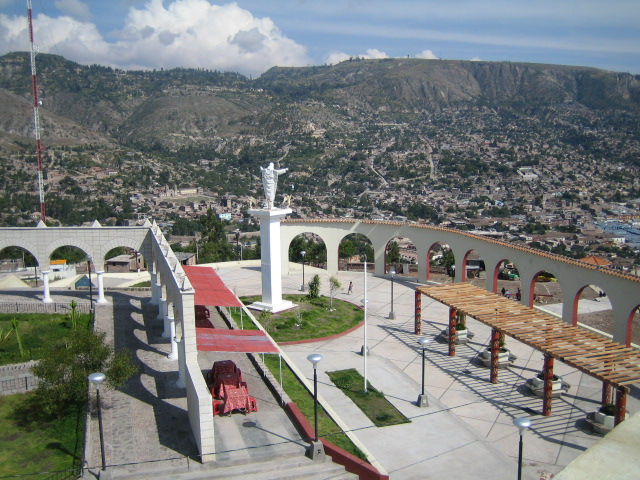

Carmen Alto District is one of fifteen districts of the province Huamanga in Peru.
