= Acocro District =

Coordinates: 13.2188°S 74.0443°W

Acocro
- District
- Interactive map of Acocro
- Country: Peru
- Region: Ayacucho
- Province: Huamanga
- Founded: November 23, 1964
- Capital: Acocro

Government
  - Mayor: Auberto Morote Enciso

Area
  - Total: 406.83 km^{2} (157.08 sq mi)
- Elevation: 3,247 m (10,653 ft)

Population (2005 census)
  - Total: 9,287
  - Density: 22.83/km^{2} (59.12/sq mi)
- Time zone: UTC-5 (PET)
- UBIGEO: 050102

Acocro District is one of fifteen districts of the province Huamanga in Peru.

== Geography ==
One of the highest mountains of the district is Yana Phiruru at approximately 4,200 m (13,800 ft). Other mountains are listed below:

- Allqa Suntu
- Anta Q'asa
- Atuq Wachanqa
- Hatun Munti
- Ichhu Pampa
- Rurun Willka
- Tarwiyuq
- Umutu Q'asa
- Waman Pirqa

== Ethnic groups ==
The people in the district are mainly indigenous citizens of Quechua descent. Quechua is the language which the majority of the population (95.51%) learnt to speak in childhood, 4.13% of the residents started speaking using the Spanish language (2007 Peru Census).
