= Ayacucho District =

Coordinates: 13°09′37″S 74°13′33″W

Ayacucho
- District
- Interactive map of Ayacucho
- Country: Peru
- Region: Ayacucho
- Province: Huamanga
- Capital: Ayacucho

Government
  - Mayor: Yuri Gutiérrez

Area
  - Total: 85.29 km^{2} (32.93 sq mi)
- Elevation: 2,746 m (9,009 ft)

Population (2017)
  - Total: 99,427
  - Density: 1,166/km^{2} (3,019/sq mi)
- Time zone: UTC-5 (PET)
- UBIGEO: 050101

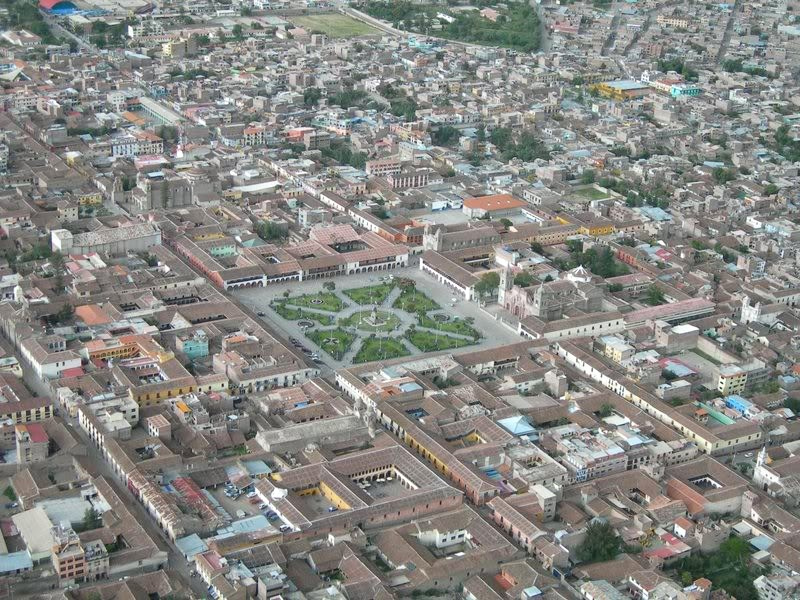
Aerial View of Historic Center of Huamanga-Ayacucho

Ayacucho District is one of fifteen districts of the province Huamanga in Peru.

== Authorities ==
=== Mayors ===
- 2019-2022: Yuri Alberto Gutiérrez Gutiérrez.
- 2015-2018: Germán Salvador Martinelli Chuchon.

== See also ==
- Qunchupata
- Wichqana
