= Chiara District, Huamanga =

Coordinates: 13.8681°S 73.6676°W

Chiara Ch'iyara
- District
- Interactive map of Chiara
- Country: Peru
- Region: Ayacucho
- Province: Huamanga
- Capital: Chiara

Government
  - Mayor: Juan Ruben Ayala Bautista

Area
  - Total: 498.42 km^{2} (192.44 sq mi)
- Elevation: 3,527 m (11,572 ft)

Population (2005 census)
  - Total: 5,826
  - Density: 11.69/km^{2} (30.27/sq mi)
- Time zone: UTC-5 (PET)
- UBIGEO: 050105

Chiara District is one of fifteen districts of the province Huamanga in Peru.

== Geography ==
One of the highest mountains of the district is Wisk'achayuq Urqu at approximately 4,200 m (13,800 ft). Other mountains are listed below:

- Ankap Wachanan
- Chawpi Urqu
- Chuqi Waqra
- Ch'akiqucha
- Hatun Usnu
- Kampanayuq Urqu
- Pichqa Pukyu
- Saywa Muqu
- Wawsiyuq
- Yana Phiruru

== Ethnic groups ==
The people in the district are mainly indigenous citizens of Quechua descent. Quechua is the language that the majority of the population (93.68%) learned to speak in childhood, through 6.10% of the residents also spoke the Spanish language (2007 Peru Census).

== See also ==
- Hatun Usnu
