= San Juan Bautista District, Huamanga =

Coordinates: 13.1659°S 74.2236°W

San Juan Bautista
- District
- Interactive map of San Juan Bautista
- Country: Peru
- Region: Ayacucho
- Province: Huamanga
- Founded: April 7, 1960
- Capital: San Juan Bautista

Government
  - Mayor: Salomon Hugo Aedo Mendoza

Area
  - Total: 18.71 km^{2} (7.22 sq mi)
- Elevation: 2,800 m (9,200 ft)

Population (2005 census)
  - Total: 37,083
  - Density: 1,982/km^{2} (5,133/sq mi)
- Time zone: UTC-5 (PET)
- UBIGEO: 050110

San Juan Bautista District is one of fifteen districts of the Huamanga Province in Peru.
