= Socos District =

Coordinates: 13.2108°S 74.2875°W

Socos
- District
- Interactive map of Socos
- Country: Peru
- Region: Ayacucho
- Province: Huamanga
- Founded: June 14, 1968
- Capital: Socos

Government
  - Mayor: Edgar Cristan Meneses

Area
  - Total: 81.75 km^{2} (31.56 sq mi)
- Elevation: 3,400 m (11,200 ft)

Population (2005 census)
  - Total: 7,454
  - Density: 91.18/km^{2} (236.2/sq mi)
- Time zone: UTC-5 (PET)
- UBIGEO: 050112

Socos District is one of fifteen districts of the province Huamanga in Peru.

== Ethnic groups ==
The people in the district are mainly indigenous citizens of Quechua descent. Quechua is the language which the majority of the population (95.47%) learnt to speak in childhood, 4.31% of the residents started speaking using the Spanish language (2007 Peru Census).
