= SoCo Music Project =

Not-for-profit community music organisation

The SoCo Music Project is a not-for-profit community music organisation based in Southampton. The name SoCo is an acronym of "Southampton Community".

== History ==
SoCo Music Project was set up by sound engineers John Haughton and Matt Salvage, seeking to provide opportunities for young people in music in the city.

== Establishments ==
=== Hightown Studios ===
In 2009, SoCo Music Project secured a £50,000 grant by winning ITV Meridian's Peoples Millions The studios will be open top the local community and provide access to a programme of workshops and activities in areas such as live music, recording, music technology, film editing, internet radio and podcasting. The studios are currently under construction and will be a part of the existing Hightown Youth Centre in Thornhill.

=== SoCo Creative Hub ===
SoCo Music Project own and run the SoCo Creative Hub in the Bargate Shopping Centre in Southampton, which opened in June 2010. The hub contains a stage where live music is performed, recording spaces, instruments and Apple Mac computers. Workshops in subject areas such as music, film, photography and art are offered at the hub. The hub is run by a small group of full and part-time workers and a team of volunteers. The hub runs on a pay-on-entry basis and also offers membership options. Two new recording studios are currently under construction.

Due to the bargate being shut down, SoCo no longer has a placement there, they are considering several other locations in Southampton.

== Current work ==
=== Radio SoCo ===
SoCo Music Project has applied for a grant from the Co-Operative initiative for a potential new Radio Station. The station would run as an internet radio station.

=== Film work ===
SoCo Music Project regularly posts ‘Balcony Session’ videos on video sharing site YouTube, filmed on location at the Creative Hub.

The hub is also home to City Eye's weekly filmmaking club and in late 2010 the hub was a major venue during Southampton Film Week.

== Events ==
- Southampton Mela Festival
- K2 Festival
- The Lost Hour
- Romsey Radio Station – SoCo Music Project helped to set up a Radio Station within The Romsey School.
- Contact Festival

== Partnerships ==
SoCo Music Project works with other local arts organisations including City Eye, Art Asia, A space, Find Your Talent, the Nuffield Theatre and the John Hansard Gallery. The organisation also has links with Southampton Solent University and the University of Southampton.
