= Soco Monument =

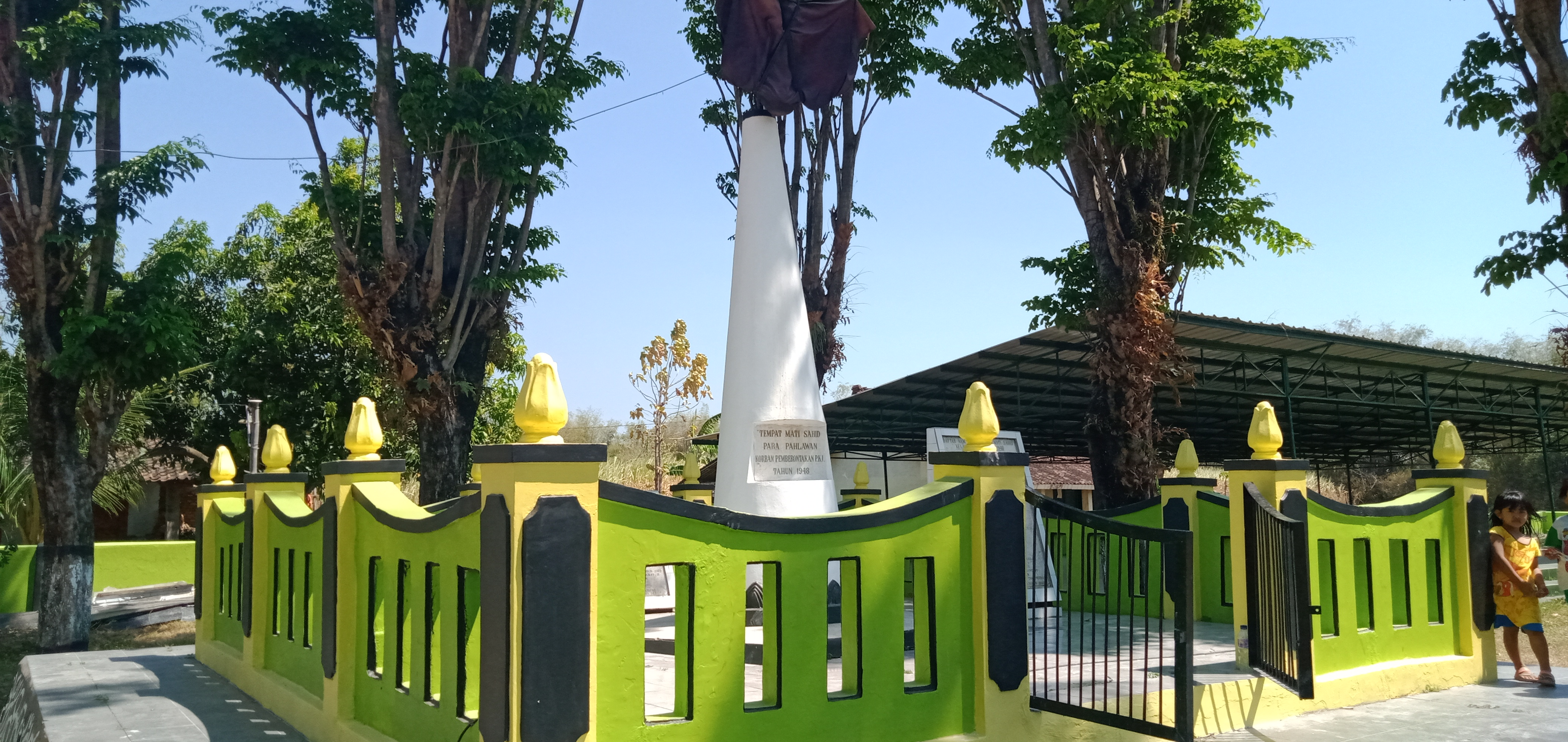
- Location: Soco, Bendo, Magetan Regency, East Java, Indonesia
- Dedicated date: 15 October 1989
- Dedicated to: Victims of Madiun Affair

The Soco Monument (Indonesian: Monumen Soco) is a historical site in Soco Village, Bendo, Magetan, East Java, Indonesia, about 15 km east of downtown Magetan. It consists of the remains of a railway carriage (the kerta pati, or death carriage), the Pendopo Loka Pitra Dharma building, the Tetengger monument, and a "hell well" where 108 people were buried after being massacred "by the Communist Party of Indonesia (PKI)" during the Madiun Rebellion of 1948. The site was established by members of the People's Representative Council in 1989. It is usually visited during traditional pilgrimages to the graveyard and napak tilas to honor the victims.

== History ==
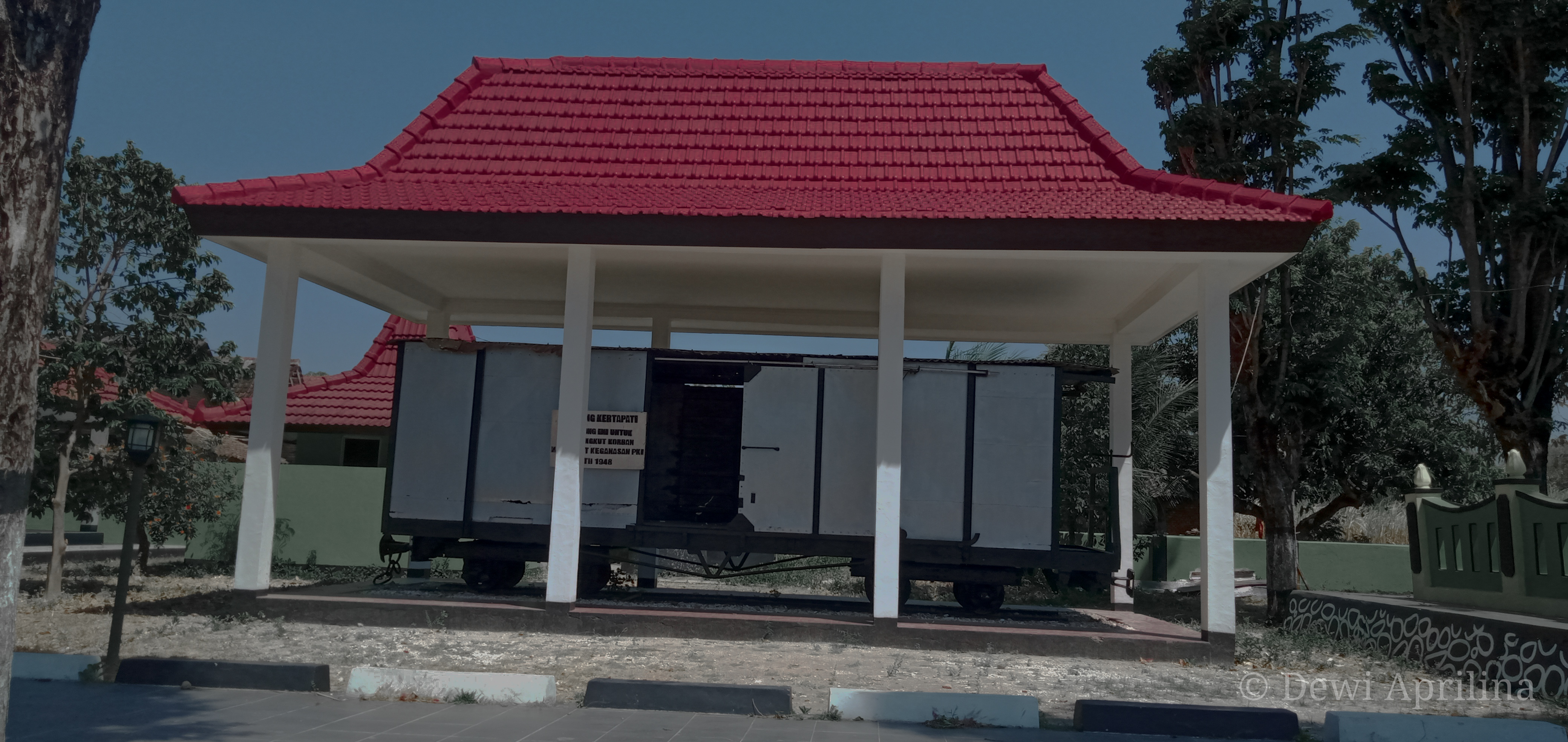
The kerta pati is preserved as a symbol of the PKI's ferocity in Magetan in 1948.

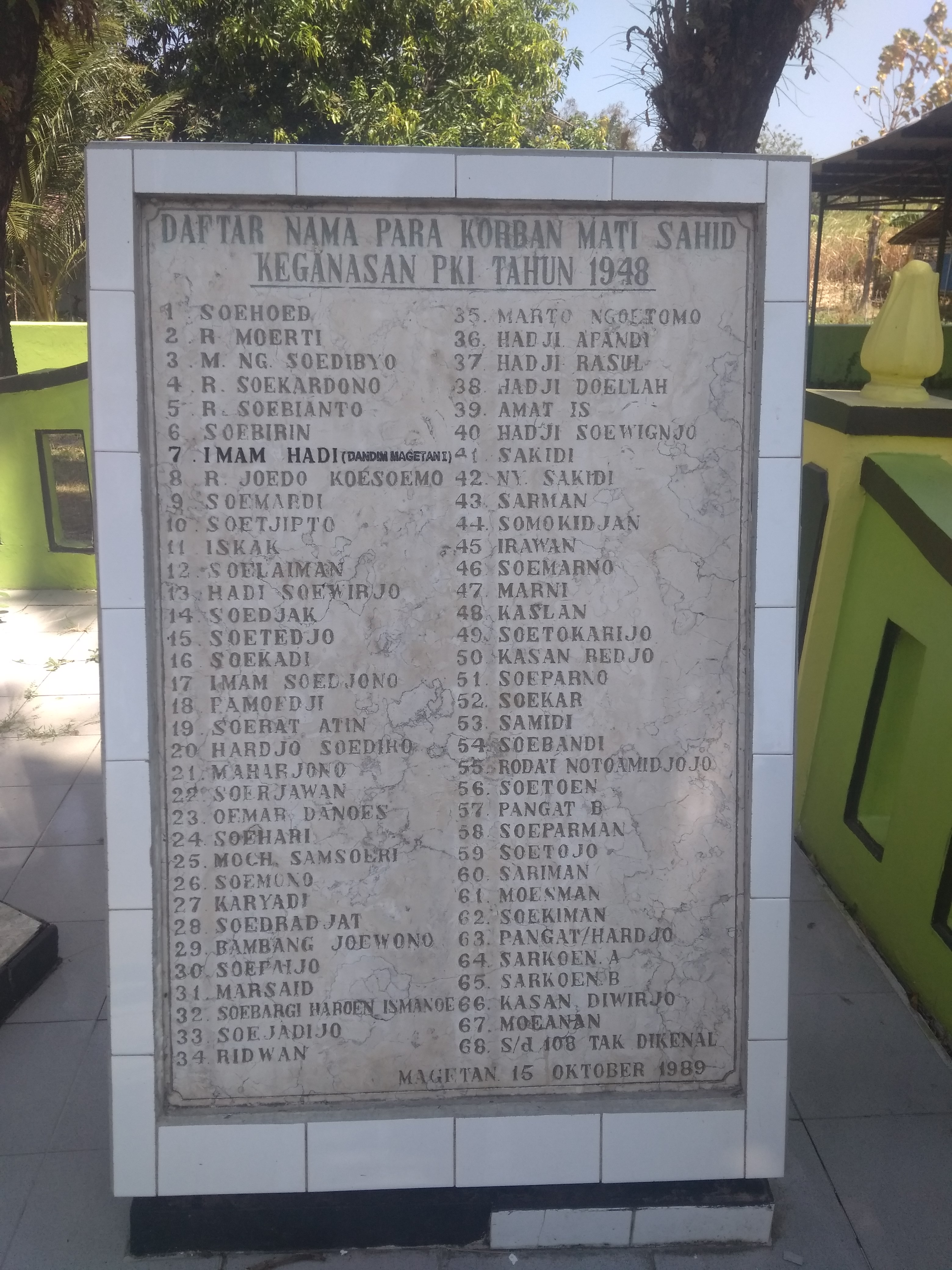
Memorial at the old well in Soco village, where 108 bodies were found. Only seventy-eight could be identified.

According to a witness named Ibrahim, the 108 victims came from several villages in the Madiun and Magetan districts. They consisted of village officials (aparat desa), clerics, community figures, soldiers, and police officers.

On September 18 1948 they were taken to the Rejosari sugar factory in Rejosari Village, where they were imprisoned in a narrow room before being shot to death. The victims' bodies were then taken to Soco Village, which is about 8 km from the sugar factory. They were transported in a railway carriage which ordinarily carried sugarcane and sugar products. Upon arrival, the bodies were thrown into a disused well and covered with large stones. Some of the victims may have been buried alive.

The railway carriage, or kerta pati (death carriage), used to transport the victims has been preserved, and a memorial stone now stands at the well. The stone is inscribed with the names of the seventy-eight victims who could be identified. These include:

- Sudibjo, the Governor of Magetan
- Jaksa R. Moerti
- Muhammad Suhud (the father of former representative councilman Kharis Suhud)
- Captain Sumarno
- KH Soelaiman Zuhdi Affandi, head of Ath-Thohirin Mojopurno Boarding School in Magetan

Besides the well and railway carriage, the site features the Tetengger monument and the Pendopo Loka Pitra Dharma building, which was inaugurated by Soedarmono during Pancasila Sanctity Day celebrations on October 1, 1992.
