= Pampa de Ayacucho Historic Sanctuary =

Historic sanctuary in Perú

Pampas de Ayacucho Historic Sanctuary
- Santuario Histórico Pampas de Ayacucho
- IUCN category III (natural monument or feature)
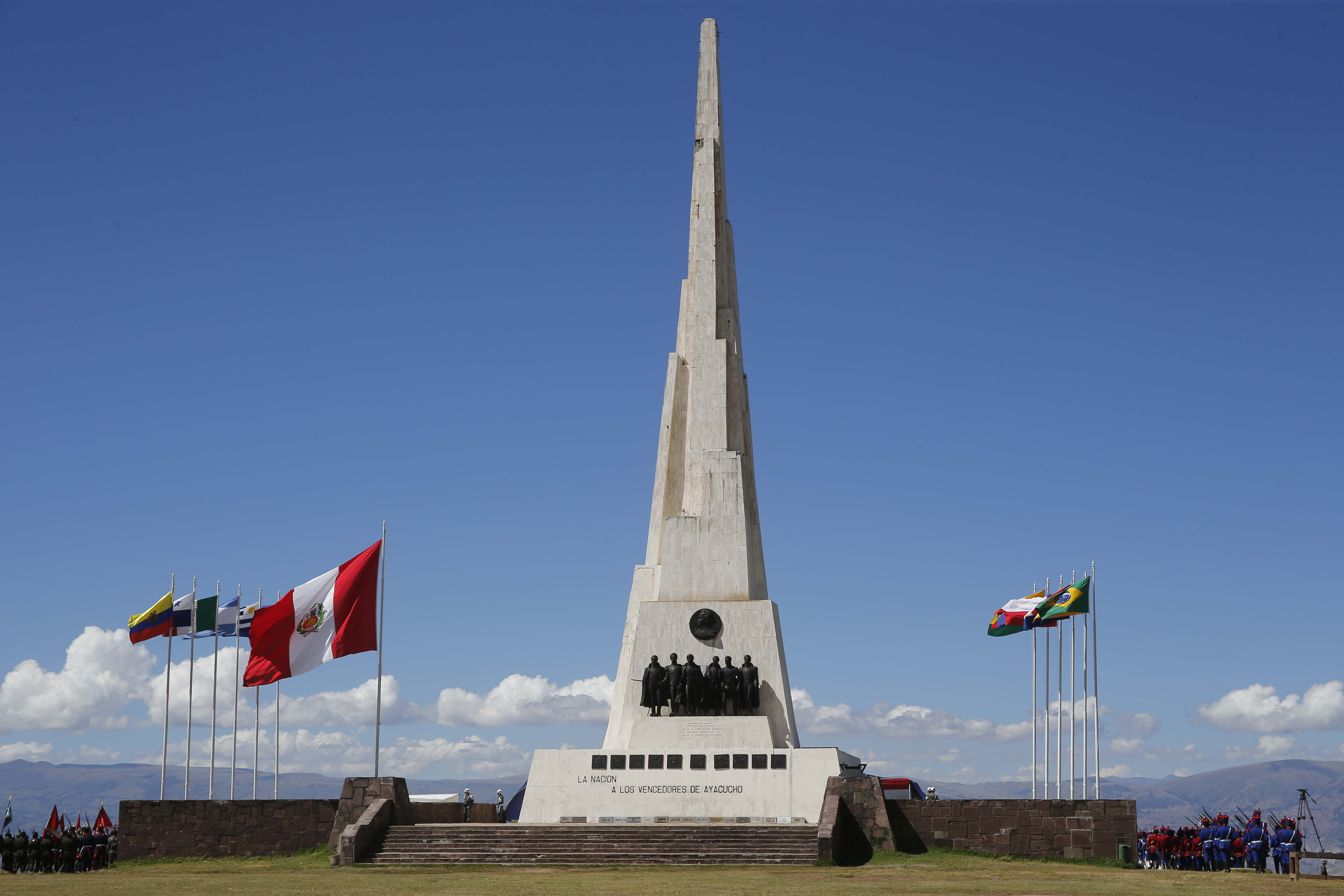
- Partial view of the historic sanctuary.

- Location within Peru
- Location: Peru; Ayacucho Region
- Nearest city: Quinua
- Coordinates: 13°02′34″S 74°07′51″W
- Area: 3 km^{2} (1.16 sq mi)
- Established: 14 August 1980
- Governing body: SERNANP
- Website: Santuario Histórico Pampas de Ayacucho

The Pampas de Ayacucho Historic Sanctuary is located near the town of Quinua in the region of Ayacucho. It has an area of 3 km^{2} and was established in 1980 to protect the site of the Battle of Ayacucho. Since 2023, it is part of the Bicentenario - Ayacucho Biosphere Reserve.

== Obelisk ==
For the sesquicentennial anniversary of the battle, the Ministry of War of Peru decided to erect a monument to the combatants on the plain. Through a public competition in 1968, the proposal for an obelisk made of marble by Spanish artist Aurelio Bernandino Arias was chosen as the winner. According to the author, "the work represents nearly half a century of struggle for freedom and American independence, from the Túpac Amaru II Revolution in 1780 to its victorious culmination at this location."

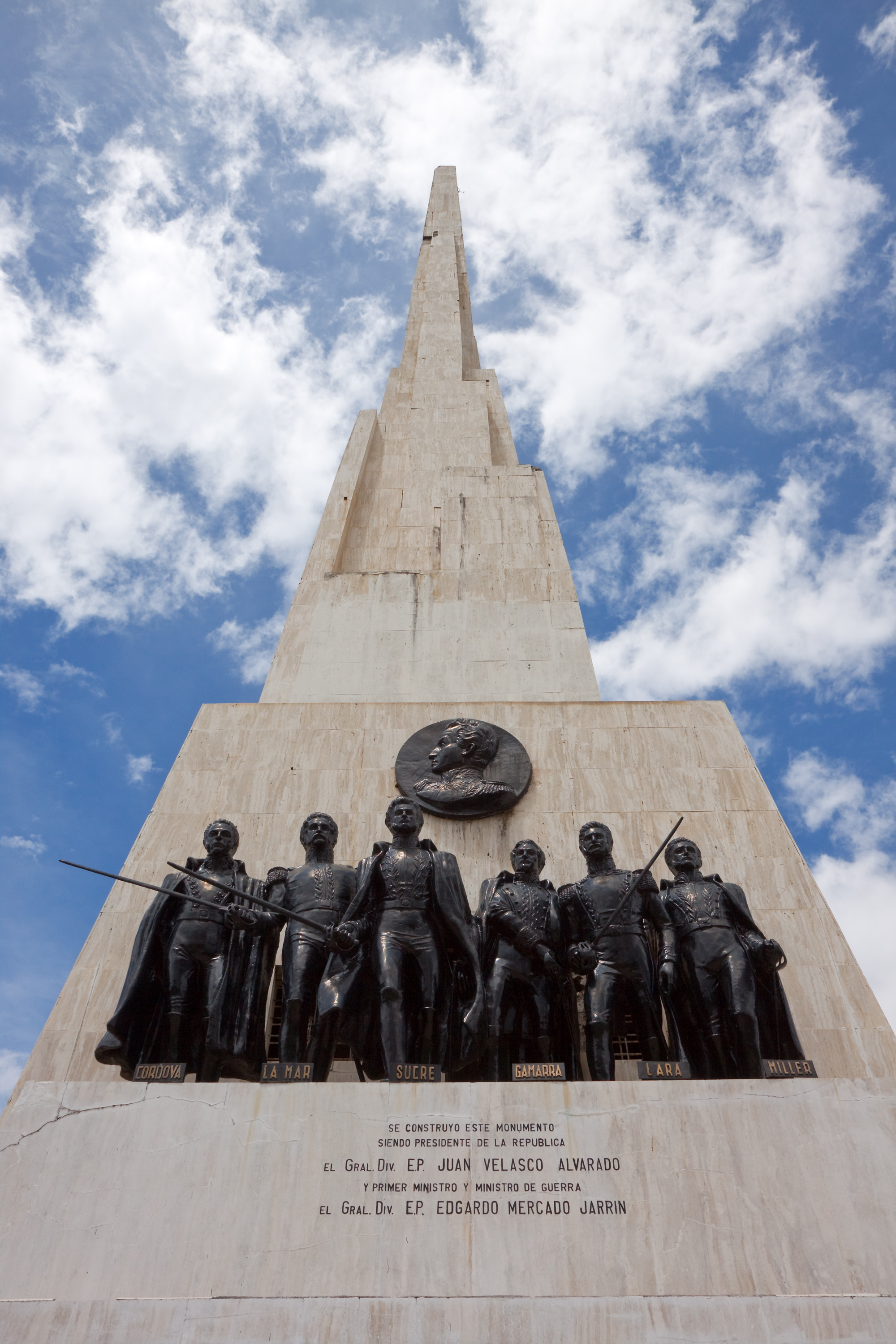
Commemorative obelisk of the Battle of Ayacucho.

The monument consists of a reinforced concrete structure covered externally with white marble. It stands 44 meters tall. The 3-meter-tall bronze statues represent the generals who were in command during the battle: Antonio José de Sucre, Agustín Gamarra, José de La Mar, José María Córdova, Jacinto Lara, and Guillermo Miller. A medallion with the effigy of the liberator Simón Bolívar evokes the strategic direction of the operations.

From its viewing platform, one can observe the beautiful landscape of the historic sanctuary. For the people of Ayacucho, the obelisk is part of the identity and pride of the Huamanga province and the department for being the place where Peruvian and South American freedom was achieved.
