= 2021 in Peruvian football =

Football in Peru
- Season: 2021

Men's football
- Liga 1: Alianza Lima
- Liga 2: Atlético Grau
- Copa Perú: ADT

Women's football
- Liga Femenina: Alianza Lima

The 2021 season in Peruvian football included all the matches of the different national male and female teams, as well as the local club tournaments, and the participation of these in international competitions in which representatives of the country's teams had participated.

== National teams ==
=== Kits ===
World Cup qualification

Home	Away

Copa América

Home	Away

==== 2022 FIFA World Cup qualification ====
3 June 2021	Peru	0–3	Colombia	Estadio Nacional, Lima
21:00 UTC−5		Report (FIFA); Report (CONMEBOL)	Mina 40'; Uribe 49'; Díaz 55'	Attendance: 0 Referee: Wilton Sampaio (Brazil)

8 June 2021	Ecuador	1–2	Peru	Estadio Rodrigo Paz Delgado, Quito
16:00 UTC−5	Plata 90+3'	Report (FIFA); Report (CONMEBOL)	Cueva 63'; Advíncula 89'	Attendance: 0 Referee: Esteban Ostojich (Uruguay)

2 September 2021	Peru	1–1	Uruguay	Estadio Nacional, Lima
20:00 UTC−5	Tapia 25'	Report (FIFA); Report (CONMEBOL)	De Arrascaeta 29'	Attendance: 8,000; Referee: Néstor Pitana (Argentina)

5 September 2021	Peru	1–0	Venezuela	Estadio Nacional, Lima
20:00 UTC−5	Cueva 35'	Report (FIFA); Report (CONMEBOL)		Attendance: 8,000; Referee: Luis Quiroz (Ecuador)

9 September 2021	Brazil	2–0	Peru	Arena Pernambuco, São Lourenço da Mata
21:30 UTC−3	Ribeiro 15'; Neymar 40'	Report (FIFA); Report (CONMEBOL)		Attendance: 0 Referee: Wilmar Roldán (Colombia)

7 October 2021	Peru	2–0	Chile	Estadio Nacional, Lima
20:00 UTC−5	Cueva 36'; Peña 64'	Report (FIFA); Report (CONMEBOL)		Attendance: 8,000; Referee: Christian Ferreyra (Uruguay)

10 October 2021	Bolivia	1–0	Peru	Estadio Hernando Siles, La Paz
16:00 UTC−4	R. Vaca 83'	Report (FIFA); Report (CONMEBOL)		Attendance: 20,000; Referee: Guillermo Guerrero (Ecuador)

14 October 2021	Argentina	1–0	Peru	Estadio Monumental Antonio Vespucio Liberti, Buenos Aires
20:30 UTC−3	La. Martínez 43'	Report (FIFA); Report (CONMEBOL)		Attendance: 36,000; Referee: Wilton Sampaio (Brazil)

11 November 2021	Peru	3–0	Bolivia	Estadio Nacional, Lima
21:00 UTC−5	Lapadula 9'; Cueva 31'; Peña 39'	Report (FIFA); Report (CONMEBOL)		Attendance: 10,000; Referee: Éber Aquino (Paraguay)

16 November 2021	Venezuela	1–2	Peru	Estadio Olímpico de la UCV, Caracas
17:00 UTC−4	Machís 52'	Report (FIFA); Report (CONMEBOL)	Lapadula 18'; Cueva 65'	Attendance: 9,000; Referee: Bruno Arleu (Brazil)

==== Copa América ====
===== Group stage =====
17 June 2021	Brazil	4–0	Peru	Estádio Olímpico Nilton Santos, Rio de Janeiro
21:00 BRT (UTC−3)	Alex Sandro 12'; Neymar 68'; Ribeiro 89'; Richarlison 90+3'	Report		Attendance: 0 Referee: Patricio Loustau (Argentina)

20 June 2021	Colombia	1–2	Peru	Estádio Olímpico Pedro Ludovico, Goiânia
21:00 BRT (UTC−3)	Borja 53' (pen.)	Report	Peña 17'; Mina 64' (o.g.)	Attendance: 0 Referee: Esteban Ostojich (Uruguay)

23 June 2021	Ecuador	2–2	Peru	Estádio Olímpico Pedro Ludovico, Goiânia
18:00 BRT (UTC−3)	Tapia 23' (o.g.); Ay. Preciado 45+3'	Report	Lapadula 49'; Carrillo 54'	Attendance: 0 Referee: Jesús Gil Manzano (Spain)

27 June 2021	Venezuela	0–1	Peru	Estádio Nacional Mané Garrincha, Brasília
18:00 BRT (UTC−3)		Report	Carrillo 48'	Attendance: 0 Referee: Patricio Loustau (Argentina)

===== Quarter-finals =====
2 July 2021	Peru	3–3 (4–3 p)	Paraguay	Estádio Olímpico Pedro Ludovico, Goiânia
18:00 BRT (UTC−3)	Gómez 21' (o.g.); Lapadula 40'; Yotún 80'	Report	Gómez 11'; Alonso 54'; Ávalos 90'	Attendance: 0 Referee: Esteban Ostojich (Uruguay)
	Penalties
	Lapadula (penalty scored); Yotún (penalty scored); Ormeño (penalty missed); Tapia (penalty scored); Cueva (penalty missed); Trauco (penalty scored)		(penalty scored) Á. Romero; (penalty scored) Alonso; (penalty missed) Martínez; (penalty missed) Samudio; (penalty scored) Piris Da Motta; (penalty missed) Espínola

===== Semi-final =====
5 July 2021	Brazil	1–0	Peru	Estádio Olímpico Nilton Santos, Rio de Janeiro
20:00 BRT (UTC−3)	Paquetá 35'	Report		Attendance: 0 Referee: Roberto Tobar (Chile)

===== Third place play-off =====
9 July 2021	Colombia	3–2	Peru	Estádio Nacional Mané Garrincha, Brasília
21:00 BRT (UTC−3)	Cuadrado 49'; Díaz 66', 90+4'	Report	Yotún 45'; Lapadula 82'	Attendance: 0 Referee: Raphael Claus (Brazil)

=== Peru national beach soccer team ===
==== FIFA Beach Soccer World Cup qualification ====
===== Group Stage =====
Pos	Team	Pld	W	W+	WP	L	GF	GA	GD	Pts	Qualification
1	Brazil (H)	4	4	0	0	0	29	11	+18	12	Knockout stage
2	Paraguay	4	3	0	0	1	18	13	+5	9	Knockout stage
3	Venezuela	4	1	1	0	2	15	20	−5	5	Fifth place match
4	Peru	4	1	0	0	3	11	14	−3	3	Seventh place match
5	Ecuador	4	0	0	0	4	8	23	−15	0	Ninth place match

Source: CONMEBOL
Rules for classification: 1) Points; 2) Head-to-head points; 3) Head-to-head goal difference; 4) Head-to-head goals scored; 5) Goal difference; 6) Goals scored; 7) Red cards; 8) Yellow cards; 9) Drawing of lots.
(H) Host

26 June 2021	Brazil	6–3	Peru	Barra Olympic Park, Rio de Janeiro
15:00	Edson Hulk 1', 13'; Brendo 7'; Catarino 11'; Alisson 29'; Zé Lucas 36'	Report	Delgado 7'; Drago 22'; Alcántara 33'	Referee: Mariano Romo (Argentina)

27 June 2021	Peru	3–4 (a.e.t.)	Venezuela	Barra Olympic Park, Rio de Janeiro
13:30	Alcántara 12', 26'; Velezmoro 35'	Report	Rosdel 16'; E.Ramos 22'; Garcia 33'; Narea 39'	Referee: Jaimito Suárez (Bolivia)

28 June 2021	Peru	0–3	Paraguay	Barra Olympic Park, Rio de Janeiro
13:30		Report	Carballo 3', 36'; M. Medina 19'	Referee: Pablo Defelippi (Argentina)

1 July 2021	Ecuador	1–5	Peru	Barra Olympic Park, Rio de Janeiro
13:30	Nevarez Vera 25'	Report	Zagaceta 6'; Velezmoro 13', 21'; Ibañez 19'; Zamora 29'	Referee: Iván Gómez (Colombia)

===== Seventh place match =====
3 July 2021	Peru	2–5	Chile	Barra Olympic Park, Rio de Janeiro
12:00		Report		Referee: Jaimito Suárez (Bolivia)

== CONMEBOL competitions ==
=== CONMEBOL Libertadores ===
==== First stage ====
24 February 2021
17:15 UTC−5

Universidad César Vallejo (Peru)	0–0	(Venezuela) Caracas
	Report

Estadio Monumental, Lima
Attendance: 0
Referee: Marlon Vera (Ecuador)
3 March 2021
18:15 UTC−4

Caracas (Venezuela)	2–0	(Peru) Universidad César Vallejo
Echeverría 20' (pen.); R. Celis 90+5'	Report

Estadio Olímpico de la UCV, Caracas
Attendance: 0
Referee: Gery Vargas (Bolivia)

==== Second stage ====
10 March 2021
21:30 UTC−3

Grêmio (Brazil)	6–1	(Peru) Ayacucho
Braz 4'; Ferreira 28'; Diego Souza 33' (pen.), 41', 86'; Azevedo 79'	Report	Quina 73'

Arena do Grêmio, Porto Alegre
Attendance: 0
Referee: Augusto Aragón (Ecuador)
16 March 2021
19:30 UTC−5

Ayacucho (Peru)	1–2	(Brazil) Grêmio
Sosa 40'	Report	Ferreira 41'; Ricardinho 87'

Estadio Olímpico Atahualpa, Quito (Ecuador)
Attendance: 0
Referee: Esteban Ostojich (Uruguay)

==== Group stage ====
Group A

Pos	Team	Pld	W	D	L	GF	GA	GD	Pts	Qualification	PAL	DYJ	IDV	UNI
1	(Brazil) Palmeiras	6	5	0	1	20	7	+13	15	Round of 16	—	3–4	5–0	6–0
2	(Argentina) Defensa y Justicia	6	2	3	1	11	8	+3	9	Round of 16	1–2	—	1–1	3–0
3	(Ecuador) Independiente del Valle	6	1	2	3	8	11	−3	5	Copa Sudamericana	0–1	1–1	—	4–0
4	(Peru) Universitario	6	1	1	4	6	19	−13	4		2–3	1–1	3–2	—

Source: CONMEBOL
21 April 2021
19:00 UTC−5

Universitario (Peru)	2–3	(Brazil) Palmeiras
Gutiérrez 65', 68' (pen.)	Report	Danilo 20'; Veiga 52'; Renan 90+5'

Estadio Monumental, Lima
Attendance: 0
Referee: Christian Ferreyra (Uruguay)
28 April 2021
19:00 UTC−3

Defensa y Justicia (Argentina)	3–0	(Peru) Universitario
Pizzini 33'; Bou 71', 80' (pen.)	Report

Estadio Norberto Tomaghello, Florencio Varela
Attendance: 0
Referee: Ángelo Hermosilla (Chile)
5 May 2021
17:00 UTC−5

Independiente del Valle (Ecuador)	4–0	(Peru) Universitario
Sánchez 45+3', 73'; Murillo 61'; Ortiz 85'	Report

Estadio Rodrigo Paz Delgado, Quito
Attendance: 0
Referee: Andrés Cunha (Uruguay)
12 May 2021
21:00 UTC−5

Universitario (Peru)	1–1	(Argentina) Defensa y Justicia
Quintero 45+5'	Report	Romero 53'

Estadio Monumental, Lima
Attendance: 0
Referee: Nicolás Gallo (Colombia)
18 May 2021
19:30 UTC−5

Universitario (Peru)	3–2	(Ecuador) Independiente del Valle
Valera 20', 48'; Quina 72'	Report	Sánchez 8'; Ortiz 59'

Estadio Monumental, Lima
Attendance: 0
Referee: Piero Maza (Chile)
27 May 2021
19:00 UTC−3

Palmeiras (Brazil)	6–0	(Peru) Universitario
Viña 42'; Zé Rafael 45+2'; Gómez 55'; Willian 60'; Rony 77', 90'	Report

Allianz Parque, São Paulo
Attendance: 0
Referee: Cristian Garay (Chile)

Group E

Pos	Team	Pld	W	D	L	GF	GA	GD	Pts	Qualification	RAC	SPA	CRI	REN
1	(Argentina) Racing	6	4	2	0	9	2	+7	14	Round of 16	—	0–0	2–1	3–0
2	(Brazil) São Paulo	6	3	2	1	9	2	+7	11	Round of 16	0–1	—	3–0	2–0
3	(Peru) Sporting Cristal	6	1	1	4	3	10	−7	4	Copa Sudamericana	0–2	0–3	—	2–0
4	(Uruguay) Rentistas	6	0	3	3	2	9	−7	3		1–1	1–1	0–0	—

Source: CONMEBOL
20 April 2021
19:30 UTC−5

Sporting Cristal (Peru)	0–3	(Brazil) São Paulo
	Report	Luan 17'; Benítez 60'; Éder 81'

Estadio Nacional, Lima
Attendance: 0
Referee: Andrés Cunha (Uruguay)
29 April 2021
19:00 UTC−3

Racing (Argentina)	2–1	(Peru) Sporting Cristal
Cáceres 13'; Chancalay 83'	Report	Gonzáles 52'

El Cilindro, Avellaneda
Attendance: 0
Referee: Ángel Arteaga (Venezuela)
5 May 2021
21:00 UTC−3

Rentistas (Uruguay)	0–0	(Peru) Sporting Cristal
	Report

Estadio Centenario, Montevideo
Attendance: 0
Referee: Carlos Herrera (Colombia)
11 May 2021
19:30 UTC−5

Sporting Cristal (Peru)	0–2	(Argentina) Racing
	Report	Chancalay 74'; Piatti 76'

Estadio Nacional, Lima
Attendance: 0
Referee: Jhon Ospina (Colombia)
19 May 2021
17:00 UTC−5

Sporting Cristal (Peru)	2–0	(Uruguay) Rentistas
Hohberg 41'; Távara 67'	Report

Estadio Nacional, Lima
Attendance: 0
Referee: Franklin Congo (Ecuador)
25 May 2021
21:30 UTC−3

São Paulo (Brazil)	3–0	(Peru) Sporting Cristal
B. Alves 25'; Rojas 68'; Bueno 70'	Report

Estádio do Morumbi, São Paulo
Attendance: 0
Referee: Wilmar Roldán (Colombia)

=== CONMEBOL Sudamericana ===
==== Fist stage ====
17 March 2021
19:30 UTC−5

UTC (Peru)	0–1	(Peru) Sport Huancayo
	Report	Balta 74'

Estadio Monumental, Lima
Attendance: 0
Referee: Augusto Menéndez (Peru)
7 April 2021
19:30 UTC−5

Sport Huancayo (Peru)	4–0	(Peru) UTC
Liliu 4'; Barreto 30'; Quintero 84'; Valverde 90+4' (pen.)	Report

Estadio Nacional, Lima
Attendance: 0
Referee: Diego Haro (Peru)

18 March 2021
19:30 UTC−5

Carlos A. Mannucci (Peru)	1–2	(Peru) Melgar
J. Fernández 90+3'	Report	Bordacahar 11', 40'

Estadio Monumental, Lima
Attendance: 0
Referee: Edwin Ordóñez (Peru)
8 April 2021
19:30 UTC−5

Melgar (Peru)	3–2	(Peru) Carlos A. Mannucci
Arias 8'; Iberico 35'; Cuesta 61' (pen.)	Report	Mifflin 15' (o.g.); J. Fernández 76'

Estadio Nacional, Lima
Attendance: 0
Referee: Michael Espinoza (Peru)

==== Group stage ====
Group D

Pos	Team	Pld	W	D	L	GF	GA	GD	Pts	Qualification	CAP	MEL	AUC	MET
1	(Brazil) Athletico Paranaense	6	5	0	1	8	1	+7	15	Round of 16	—	1–0	4–0	1–0
2	(Peru) Melgar	6	3	1	2	7	5	+2	10		1–0	—	2–0	0–0
3	(Ecuador) Aucas	6	2	0	4	7	11	−4	6		0–1	2–1	—	3–0
4	(Venezuela) Metropolitanos	6	1	1	4	5	10	−5	4		0–1	2–3	3–2	—

Source: CONMEBOL
20 April 2021
18:15 UTC−4

Metropolitanos (Venezuela)	2–3	(Peru) Melgar
Bahachille 9'; Bustillo 20'	Report	Cuesta 45+5'; Iberico 53'; Vidales 88'

Estadio Olímpico de la UCV, Caracas
Attendance: 0
Referee: Carlos Herrera (Colombia)
28 April 2021
19:30 UTC−5

Melgar (Peru)	2–0	(Ecuador) Aucas
Cuesta 21' (pen.), 53'	Report

Estadio Nacional, Lima
Attendance: 0
Referee: Carlos Ortega (Colombia)
4 May 2021
19:30 UTC−5

Melgar (Peru)	1–0	(Brazil) Athletico Paranaense
Bordacahar 50'	Report

Estadio Nacional, Lima
Attendance: 0
Referee: Carlos Betancur (Colombia)
13 May 2021
19:30 UTC−5

Aucas (Ecuador)	2–1	(Peru) Melgar
Vega 56'; Carrera 78'	Report	Cuesta 7'

Estadio Gonzalo Pozo Ripalda, Quito
Attendance: 0
Referee: Fernando Echenique (Argentina)
19 May 2021
21:30 UTC−3

Athletico Paranaense (Brazil)	1–0	(Peru) Melgar
Kayzer 43'	Report

Arena da Baixada, Curitiba
Attendance: 0
Referee: Andrés Matonte (Uruguay)
27 May 2021
19:30 UTC−5

Melgar (Peru)	0–0	(Venezuela) Metropolitanos
	Report

Estadio Monumental, Lima
Attendance: 0
Referee: Gery Vargas (Bolivia)

Group E

Pos	Team	Pld	W	D	L	GF	GA	GD	Pts	Qualification	PEÑ	COR	RIV	SHU
1	(Uruguay) Peñarol	6	4	1	1	15	3	+12	13	Round of 16	—	4–0	3–0	5–1
2	(Brazil) Corinthians	6	3	1	2	12	6	+6	10		0–2	—	4–0	5–0
3	(Paraguay) River Plate	6	3	1	2	6	10	−4	10		2–1	0–0	—	2–1
4	(Peru) Sport Huancayo	6	0	1	5	3	17	−14	1		0–0	0–3	1–2	—

Source: CONMEBOL
22 April 2021
21:30 UTC−3

Peñarol (Uruguay)	5–1	(Peru) Sport Huancayo
Álvarez Martínez 16', 80'; Torres 33'; Kagelmacher 45'; Terans 69' (pen.)	Report	Liliu 17'

Estadio Campeón del Siglo, Montevideo
Attendance: 0
Referee: Alex Cajas (Ecuador)
29 April 2021
17:15 UTC−5

Sport Huancayo (Peru)	1–2	(Paraguay) River Plate
Liliu 38'	Report	González 5', 43'

Estadio Nacional, Lima
Attendance: 0
Referee: Nicolás Gallo (Colombia)
6 May 2021
19:30 UTC−5

Sport Huancayo (Peru)	0–3	(Brazil) Corinthians
	Report	Luan 5', 76'; Cauê 31'

Estadio Nacional, Lima
Attendance: 0
Referee: Jhon Ospina (Colombia)
13 May 2021
20:30 UTC−4

River Plate (Paraguay)	2–1	(Peru) Sport Huancayo
Pérez 38'; González 62'	Report	Arroé 19'

Estadio Defensores del Chaco, Asunción
Attendance: 0
Referee: Ángelo Hermosilla (Chile)
20 May 2021
21:30 UTC−3

Corinthians (Brazil)	5–0	(Peru) Sport Huancayo
Gustavo Mosquito 11', 69'; Vital 35'; Gil 57'; Luan 82'	Report

Arena Corinthians, São Paulo
Attendance: 0
Referee: Ángelo Hermosilla (Chile)
26 May 2021
19:30 UTC−5

Sport Huancayo (Peru)	0–0	(Uruguay) Peñarol
	Report

Estadio Monumental, Lima
Attendance: 0
Referee: Facundo Tello (Argentina)

== Liga 1 ==
=== Fase 1 ===
Group A

Pos	Team	Pld	W	D	L	GF	GA	GD	Pts	Qualification
1	Universidad San Martín	9	6	1	2	10	6	+4	19	Advance to Fase 1 final
2	Ayacucho	9	3	6	0	16	10	+6	15	
3	Universitario	9	4	3	2	12	11	+1	15	
4	Cienciano	9	4	2	3	14	12	+2	14	
5	Carlos A. Mannucci	9	3	3	3	13	14	−1	12	
6	Alianza Atlético	9	3	1	5	10	9	+1	10	
7	UTC	9	3	1	5	9	12	−3	10	
8	Cantolao	9	3	1	5	8	13	−5	10	
9	Melgar	9	2	3	4	11	12	−1	9	

Source: Liga 1, Soccerway
Rules for classification: 1) Points; 2) Goal difference; 3) Goals for; 4) Drawing of lots.

Group B

Pos	Team	Pld	W	D	L	GF	GA	GD	Pts	Qualification
1	Sporting Cristal	9	8	0	1	18	6	+12	24	Advance to Fase 1 final
2	Universidad César Vallejo	9	5	3	1	17	8	+9	18	
3	Alianza Lima	9	4	4	1	12	6	+6	16	
4	Sport Huancayo	9	3	3	3	8	9	−1	12	
5	Sport Boys	9	3	1	5	12	14	−2	10	
6	Alianza Universidad	9	3	1	5	8	13	−5	10	
7	Cusco	9	1	5	3	12	13	−1	8	
8	Deportivo Municipal	9	2	1	6	6	15	−9	7	
9	Binacional	9	1	1	7	8	21	−13	4	

Source: Liga 1, Soccerway
Rules for classification: 1) Points; 2) Goal difference; 3) Goals for; 4) Drawing of lots.

Final

30 May 2021
14:00

Sporting Cristal	2–0 (a.e.t.)	Universidad San Martín
Hohberg 94'; Riquelme 107' (pen.)	Report

Estadio Alejandro Villanueva, Lima
Attendance: 0
Referee: Kevin Ortega

=== Fase 2 ===
Pos	Team	Pld	W	D	L	GF	GA	GD	Pts	Qualification
1	Alianza Lima	17	12	4	1	27	11	+16	40	Advance to Playoffs and qualification for Copa Libertadores
2	Sporting Cristal	17	10	4	3	39	23	+16	34	
3	Universitario	17	9	5	3	31	19	+12	32	
4	Melgar	17	9	4	4	34	15	+19	31	
5	Sport Boys	17	7	7	3	24	20	+4	28	
6	Cienciano	17	6	8	3	27	20	+7	26	
7	Deportivo Municipal	17	7	3	7	26	22	+4	24	
8	Universidad César Vallejo	17	6	6	5	14	12	+2	24	
9	Carlos A. Mannucci	17	7	3	7	27	26	+1	24	
10	UTC	17	6	5	6	19	21	−2	23	
11	Ayacucho	17	6	4	7	21	26	−5	22	
12	Binacional	17	6	3	8	24	29	−5	21	
13	Sport Huancayo	17	3	9	5	18	21	−3	18	
14	Cantolao	17	4	5	8	20	24	−4	17	
15	Cusco	17	4	4	9	30	36	−6	16	
16	Alianza Atlético	17	4	3	10	21	37	−16	15	
17	Alianza Universidad	17	3	5	9	17	32	−15	14	
18	Universidad San Martín	17	1	4	12	8	33	−25	7	

Source: Liga 1, Soccerway
Rules for classification: 1) Points; 2) Goal difference; 3) Goals for; 4) Fair play points; 5) Drawing of lots.

=== Aggregate table ===
Pos	Team	Pld	W	D	L	GF	GA	GD	Pts	Qualification or relegation
1	Sporting Cristal	26	18	4	4	57	29	+28	58	Advance to Playoffs and qualification for Copa Libertadores group stage
2	Alianza Lima (C)	26	16	8	2	39	17	+22	56	Advance to Playoffs and qualification for Copa Libertadores group stage
3	Universitario	26	13	8	5	43	30	+13	47	Qualification for Copa Libertadores second stage
4	Universidad César Vallejo	26	11	9	6	31	20	+11	42	Qualification for Copa Libertadores first stage
5	Melgar	26	11	7	8	45	27	+18	40	Qualification for Copa Sudamericana first stage (Note: Since the winners of the 2021 Copa Bicentenario, Sporting Cristal, qualified for South American competition based on league performance, the Copa Sudamericana first stage berth allocated to the Copa Bicentenario winners was transferred to the aggregate table best placed team not yet qualified for international competition.)
6	Cienciano	26	10	10	6	41	32	+9	40	Qualification for Copa Sudamericana first stage
7	Sport Boys	26	10	8	8	36	34	+2	38	Qualification for Copa Sudamericana first stage
8	Ayacucho	26	9	10	7	37	36	+1	37	Qualification for Copa Sudamericana first stage
9	Carlos A. Mannucci	26	10	6	10	40	40	0	36	
10	UTC	26	9	6	11	28	33	−5	33	
11	Sport Huancayo	26	6	12	8	26	30	−4	30	
12	Deportivo Municipal	26	9	4	13	32	37	−5	31	
13	Cantolao	26	7	6	13	28	37	−9	27	
14	Alianza Atlético	26	7	4	15	31	46	−15	25	
15	Binacional	26	7	4	15	32	50	−18	25	
16	Universidad San Martín	26	7	5	14	18	39	−21	26	Qualification for Relegation playoff
17	Cusco (R)	26	5	9	12	42	49	−7	24	Relegation to Liga 2
18	Alianza Universidad (R)	26	6	6	14	25	45	−20	24	Relegation to Liga 2

Source: Liga 1
Rules for classification: 1) Points; 2) Goal difference; 3) Goals for; 4) Fair play points; 5) Drawing of lots.
(C) Champions; (R) Relegated

=== Finals ===
21 November 2021
15:00

Alianza Lima	1–0	Sporting Cristal
Barcos 33'	Report

Estadio Nacional, Lima
Referee: Diego Haro
28 November 2021
15:00

Sporting Cristal	0–0	Alianza Lima
	Report

Estadio Nacional, Lima
Referee: Kevin Ortega

== Liga 2 ==
=== Fase 1 ===
Pos	Team	Pld	W	D	L	GF	GA	GD	Pts	Qualification
1	Sport Chavelines	11	7	2	2	28	16	+12	23	Advance to Title Playoff
2	Atlético Grau	11	6	3	2	18	10	+8	21	
3	Unión Comercio	11	4	4	3	18	12	+6	16	
4	Juan Aurich	11	4	4	3	12	11	+1	16	
5	Deportivo Llacuabamba	11	4	4	3	21	22	−1	16	
6	Carlos Stein	11	3	6	2	15	14	+1	15	
7	Santos	11	4	3	4	15	16	−1	15	
8	Cultural Santa Rosa	11	3	5	3	18	17	+1	14	
9	Comerciantes Unidos	11	4	2	5	15	20	−5	14	
10	Deportivo Coopsol	11	3	4	4	11	15	−4	13	
11	Unión Huaral	11	2	3	6	12	20	−8	9	
12	Pirata	11	0	4	7	17	27	−10	4	

Source: ADFP-SD - official site, Liga 2 - official site
Rules for classification: 1) points; 2) goal difference; 3) goals scored; 4) draw.

=== Fase 2 ===
Pos	Team	Pld	W	D	L	GF	GA	GD	Pts
1	Unión Huaral	11	7	2	2	24	13	+11	23
2	Unión Comercio	11	6	3	2	22	12	+10	21
3	Carlos Stein	11	6	1	4	16	11	+5	19
4	Atlético Grau	11	5	3	3	21	14	+7	18
5	Los Chankas	11	5	3	3	18	13	+5	18
6	Deportivo Llacuabamba	11	5	2	4	12	13	−1	17
7	Sport Chavelines	11	4	4	3	21	18	+3	16
8	Deportivo Coopsol	11	4	1	6	16	19	−3	13
9	Juan Aurich	11	2	6	3	21	20	+1	12
10	Pirata	11	3	2	6	16	28	−12	11
11	Santos	11	2	2	7	9	19	−10	8
12	Comerciantes Unidos	11	1	3	7	10	26	−16	6

Source: ADFP-SD - official site
Rules for classification: 1) points; 2) goal difference; 3) goals scored; 4) draw.

=== Aggregate table ===
Pos	Team	Pld	W	D	L	GF	GA	GD	Pts	Qualification
1	Sport Chavelines	22	11	6	5	49	34	+15	39	Advance to Title Playoff
2	Atlético Grau	22	11	6	5	39	24	+15	39	Advance to Title Playoff
3	Unión Comercio	22	10	7	5	40	24	+16	37	Advance to Revalidación
4	Carlos Stein	22	9	7	6	31	25	+6	34	Advance to Revalidación
5	Deportivo Llacuabamba	22	9	6	7	33	35	−2	33	Advance to Revalidación
6	Los Chankas	22	8	8	6	36	30	+6	32	Advance to Revalidación
7	Unión Huaral	22	9	5	8	36	33	+3	32	
8	Juan Aurich	22	6	10	6	33	31	+2	28	
9	Deportivo Coopsol	22	7	5	10	27	34	−7	26	
10	Santos	22	6	5	11	24	35	−11	23	
11	Comerciantes Unidos	22	5	5	12	25	46	−21	20	
12	Pirata	22	3	6	13	33	55	−22	15	

Source: ADFP-SD - official site
Rules for classification: 1) points; 2) goal difference; 3) goals scored; 4) draw.

==== Final ====
9 October 2021
19:30

Sport Chavelines	1–2	Atlético Grau
Matías Sen 50' (pen.)		Mario Ceballos 4'; Delio Ojeda 77'

Estadio San Marcos
Referee: Bruno Pérez

=== Revalidación ===
Quarterfinals

5 October 2021
11:30

Carlos Stein	2–1	Deportivo Llacuabamba
Rodin Quiñones 29' 78'		Andrés López 83' (o.g.)

Estadio San Marcos
Referee: Pablo López
5 October 2021
15:00

Unión Comercio	2–1	Los Chankas
Edis Ibargüen 7'; Sergio Almirón 90+5' (pen.)		Luis Machado 27'

Estadio San Marcos
Referee: Edwin Ordoñez

Semifinal

9 October 2021
16:30

Unión Comercio	0–0	Carlos Stein
Penalties
Sergio Almirón (penalty scored); Julián Muñoz (penalty scored); Edis Ibargüen (penalty scored); Mario Velarde (penalty scored); Félix Uculmana (penalty missed); Cristian Neira (penalty missed); Carlos Mosquera (penalty scored); Maelo Reátegui (penalty scored); Dustin Rengifo (penalty missed)	6–7	Víctor Salas (penalty scored); Stefano Brundo (penalty missed); Mario Ramírez (penalty scored); Brandon Palacios (penalty scored); José Cotrina (penalty scored); Josimar Vargas (penalty missed); Gibson Fuentes (penalty scored); Luis Valverde (penalty scored); Josimar Atoche (penalty scored)

Estadio San Marcos
Referee: Augusto Menéndez

Final

15 October 2021
15:00

Sport Chavelines	1–2	Carlos Stein
Matías Sen 73' (pen.)		Víctor Salas 38'; Brandon Palacios 69'

Estadio San Marcos
Referee: Kevin Ortega

=== Promotion playoff ===
4 November 2021
15:00

Carlos Stein	0–1	Binacional
		Johan Arango 55'

Estadio Monumental, Lima
Referee: Michael Espinoza
7 November 2021
15:00

Binacional	0–1	Carlos Stein
	Report	Maximiliano Freitas 77'
Penalties
Camilo Mancilla (penalty scored); Carlos Caraza (penalty missed); Andy Polar (penalty scored); Anthony Rosell (penalty missed)	2–4	(penalty scored) Víctor Salas; (penalty scored) Maximiliano Freitas; (penalty missed) Mario Ramírez; (penalty scored) Rodin Quiñones; (penalty scored) Andrés López

Estadio Monumental, Lima
Referee: Edwin Ordóñez

== Copa Peru ==
=== Final ===
29 November 2021	ADT	0–0 (5–3 p)	Alfonso Ugarte	Estadio San Marcos
13:30				Referee: Michael Espinoza
	Penalties
	Víctor Jiménez (penalty scored); Nelson Dávila (penalty scored); Emilio Gutiérrez (penalty scored); Sinclair García (penalty scored); Gu-Rum Choi (penalty scored)		Allonso Dávila (penalty scored); Saúl Reyes (penalty missed); José Luis Granda (penalty scored); Marcos Ortiz (penalty scored)

=== Promotion ===
ADT was promoted to the following year's first level.

== Women's football ==
=== Liga Femenina ===
==== First stage ====
Pos	Team	Pld	W	D	L	GF	GA	GD	Pts	Qualification
1	Alianza Lima	12	11	1	0	68	0	+68	34	Advance to semi-finals
2	Universitario	12	11	1	0	62	2	+60	34	Advance to semi-finals
3	Carlos A. Mannucci	12	8	1	3	35	11	+24	25	Advance to repechage
4	Universidad César Vallejo	12	7	1	4	24	9	+15	22	Advance to repechage
5	Cantolao	12	7	1	4	26	21	+5	22	Advance to repechage
6	Sporting Cristal	12	6	2	4	40	13	+27	20	Advance to repechage
7	Atlético Trujillo	12	6	0	6	22	33	−11	18	
8	Deportivo Municipal	12	5	1	6	20	28	−8	16	
9	Killas	12	3	4	5	16	29	−13	13	
10	Ayacucho	12	3	1	8	19	43	−24	10	
11	Universidad San Martín	12	3	0	9	12	50	−38	9	
12	UTC	12	0	2	10	9	56	−47	2	
13	Sport Boys	12	0	1	11	8	66	−58	1	

Source: FPF
Rules for classification: 1) Points; 2) Goal difference; 3) Goals for; 4) Drawing of lots.

==== Repechage ====
25 August 2021
10:30

Cantolao	0–4	Universidad César Vallejo
	Report	Gherson 1'; Joya 25'; Flores 59', 90+2'

Estadio San Marcos, Lima
Attendance: 0
Referee: Elizabeth Tintaya
25 August 2021
13:30

Carlos A. Mannucci	2–3	Sporting Cristal
Mamani 66'; Bravo 78'	Report	Espejo 25', 60'; Jainudeen 42'

Estadio San Marcos, Lima
Attendance: 0
Referee: Sebastián Moreno

==== Semi-finals ====
29 August 2021
12:00

Alianza Lima	1–1	Universidad César Vallejo
Romero 24'	Report	Flores 22'
Penalties
Lúcar (penalty scored); Romero (penalty scored); Reyes (penalty scored); Dorador (penalty scored); Tristán (penalty scored)	5–4	(penalty scored) Parró; (penalty missed) Dávila; (penalty scored) Gálvez; (penalty scored) Flores; (penalty scored) Luque

Estadio San Marcos, Lima
Attendance: 0
Referee: Gaby Oncoy
29 August 2021
15:00

Universitario	1–0	Sporting Cristal
Flores 77'	Report

Estadio San Marcos, Lima
Attendance: 0
Referee: Priscila Vásquez

==== Final ====
4 September 2021
16:00

Alianza Lima	1–0	Universitario
Romero 13'	Report

Estadio San Marcos, Lima
Attendance: 0
Referee: Elizabeth Tintaya
