= Shevlin =

Shevlin may refer to:

People with the surname Shevlin:

- Caroline Shevlin (born 1989), American footballer
- Grace Shevlin (born 1989), American footballer
- Matthew Shevlin (born 1998), Northern Irish footballer
- Peter Shevlin (1902–1948), Scottish footballer
- Phil Shevlin, American chemist
- Maddie Shevlin (born 1997), Australian rules footballer
- Jimmy Shevlin (1909–1974), American baseball player
- Tom Shevlin (1883–1915), American gridiron football player, coach, and businessman

Geographic locations:

- Shevlin, Minnesota, a city
- Shevlin Township, Clearwater County, Minnesota
- Shevlin, Oregon, an unincorporated community
