= 2021 Liga Femenina FPF =

Liga Femenina
- Season: 2021
- Dates: First stage: 29 May – 22 August; Final stage (play-offs): 25 August – 4 September
- Champions: Alianza Lima (1st title)
- Copa Libertadores: Alianza Lima
- Matches: 83
- Goals: 374 (4.51 per match)
- Top goalscorer: Adriana Lucar (23 goals)
- Highest scoring: UTC 0–14 Universitario (25 July); Sport Boys 0–14 Alianza Lima (8 August)
- All statistics correct as of 29 August 2021.

The 2021 Liga Femenina was the 23rd season of the Peruvian Primera División Femenina (and the first one under the currently format).. The season began on 29 May and ended on 4 September with the final.

Planned to be held in 2020, the inaugural season of the Liga Femenina was delayed until 2021 due to the COVID-19 pandemic.

Alianza Lima won their first title after defeating Universitario by a 1–0 score in the final. As champions, Alianza Lima qualified for the 2021 Copa Libertadores Femenina.

== Competition format ==
The season was divided into two stages: First stage and Final stage (play-offs). The First stage was played under a single round-robin format with the 13 teams playing each other once. The Final stage was contested by teams ranked 1st to 6th in the First stage, with teams ranked 1st and 2nd directly qualified for semifinals and teams ranked 3rd to 6th qualified for a previous qualifying round or repechage to reach the semifinals. Winners of semifinals played the final to decide the national champion.

== Teams ==
13 teams played in the 2021 Liga Femenina season. In February 2020, the Peruvian Football Federation (FPF) invited the women's division of Liga 1 and Liga 2 clubs and all women's football clubs nationwide to participate in the first Liga Femenina with a maximum of 16 teams. Clubs had until 6 March 2020 to submit their application and were later evaluated on different criteria before being accepted.

Eventually, 14 teams completed and approved the application process to play in the 2020 Liga Femenina but the tournament had to be postponed due to the COVID-19 pandemic. In december 2020, FPF announced that the Liga Femenina would start in May 2021 and the 14 teams had to confirm their participation until 22 January 2021.

On 27 May 2021 it was announced that Real Apurímac decided to withdraw from the tournament, reducing the teams to 13.

=== Stadia and locations ===
Locations of the 2021 Liga Femenina teams

Team	Manager	City	Stadium	Capacity
Academia Cantolao	(Peru) Vivian Ayres	Callao	Miguel Grau	17,000
Alianza Lima	(Peru) Samir Mendoza	Lima	Alejandro Villanueva	35,000
Atlético Trujillo	(Peru) Danny Pita	Trujillo	Mansiche	25,000
Ayacucho	(Brazil) Oseas de Souza	Ayacucho	Ciudad de Cumaná	15,000
Carlos A. Mannucci	(Peru) Luis Cordero	Trujillo	Mansiche	25,000
Deportivo Municipal	(Peru) Rones Bernable	Lima	Iván Elías Moreno	10,000
Killas	(Peru) Richard Salcedo	Lima	Andrés Bedoya Díaz	10,000
Sport Boys	(Peru) Alexandra Díaz	Callao	Miguel Grau	17,000
Sporting Cristal	(Peru) Olienka Salinas	Lima	Alberto Gallardo	18,000
Universidad César Vallejo	(Peru) Daniel Ayudante	Trujillo	Mansiche	25,000
Universidad San Martín	(Peru) Miguel Granados	Lima	Alberto Gallardo	18,000
Universitario	(Peru) Juan Durand	Lima	Monumental	80,093
UTC	(Peru) Edwin Arévalo	Cajamarca	Héroes de San Ramón	18,000

Because of the COVID-19 pandemic, the whole tournament was played in Lima at Estadio San Marcos.

== First stage ==
=== Standings ===
Pos	Team	Pld	W	D	L	GF	GA	GD	Pts	Qualification
1	Alianza Lima	12	11	1	0	68	0	+68	34	Advance to semi-finals
2	Universitario	12	11	1	0	62	2	+60	34	Advance to semi-finals
3	Carlos A. Mannucci	12	8	1	3	35	11	+24	25	Advance to repechage
4	Universidad César Vallejo	12	7	1	4	24	9	+15	22	Advance to repechage
5	Academia Cantolao	12	7	1	4	26	21	+5	22	Advance to repechage
6	Sporting Cristal	12	6	2	4	40	13	+27	20	Advance to repechage
7	Atlético Trujillo	12	6	0	6	22	33	−11	18	
8	Deportivo Municipal	12	5	1	6	20	28	−8	16	
9	Killas	12	3	4	5	16	29	−13	13	
10	Ayacucho	12	3	1	8	19	43	−24	10	
11	Universidad San Martín	12	3	0	9	12	50	−38	9	
12	UTC	12	0	2	10	9	56	−47	2	
13	Sport Boys	12	0	1	11	8	66	−58	1	

Source: FPF
Rules for classification: 1) Points; 2) Goal difference; 3) Goals for; 4) Drawing of lots.

=== Results ===
The match schedule was decided based on the draw which was held on 24 May 2021.

Home \ Away	ALI	ATR	AYA	CAN	CAM	MUN	KIL	SBA	SCR	UCV	USM	UNI	UTC
Alianza Lima			7–0				7–0			2–0		0–0	7–0
Atlético Trujillo	0–10						3–4	3–0	1–0	1–3	4–1	0–8	
Ayacucho		0–1			0–5	0–5					4–2		9–1
Academia Cantolao	0–4	4–1	3–0		0–3	1–0							5–1
Carlos A. Mannucci	0–1	0–3				4–1	4–1			2–0	6–1	0–2	
Deportivo Municipal	0–4	3–2					1–1		0–7	0–1	2–0	1–5	
Killas			2–2	2–1				3–2	1–1	0–2		0–3	
Sport Boys	0–14		1–2	0–7	0–6	1–4							2–2
Sporting Cristal	0–3		9–2	1–2	1–1			10–0					3–0
Universidad César Vallejo			2–0	1–1				6–0	1–2				3–0
Universidad San Martín	0–9			0–1			2–1	3–2	1–6	0–5		0–9	
Universitario			5–0	8–1				6–0	1–0	1–0			
UTC		0–3			1–4	2–3	1–1				1–2	0–14	

Source: FPF
Legend: Blue = home team win; Yellow = draw; Red = away team win.

== Final stage ==
In the final stage, if a match was tied after 90 minutes, extra time was not played and the match was decided directly by a penalty shoot-out, except for the final where extra time and penalty shoot-out would be used to decide the winner if necessary.

- All match times listed are PET (UTC−5).

=== Bracket ===
Repechage
4	Universidad César Vallejo	4
5	Academia Cantolao	0
3	Carlos A. Mannucci	2
6	Sporting Cristal	3

Semi-finals
1	Alianza Lima (p)	1 (5)
4	Universidad César Vallejo	1 (4)
2	Universitario	1
6	Sporting Cristal	0

Final
1	Alianza Lima	1
2	Universitario	0

=== Repechage ===
25 August 2021
10:30

Academia Cantolao	0–4	Universidad César Vallejo
	Report	Gherson 1'; Joya 25'; Flores 59', 90+2'

Estadio San Marcos, Lima
Attendance: 0
Referee: Elizabeth Tintaya
25 August 2021
13:30

Carlos A. Mannucci	2–3	Sporting Cristal
Mamani 66'; Bravo 78'	Report	Espejo 25', 60'; Jainudeen 42'

Estadio San Marcos, Lima
Attendance: 0
Referee: Sebastián Moreno

=== Semi-finals ===
29 August 2021
12:00

Alianza Lima	1–1	Universidad César Vallejo
Romero 24'	Report	Flores 22'
Penalties
Lúcar (penalty scored); Romero (penalty scored); Reyes (penalty scored); Dorador (penalty scored); Tristán (penalty scored)	5–4	(penalty scored) Parró; (penalty missed) Dávila; (penalty scored) Gálvez; (penalty scored) Flores; (penalty scored) Luque

Estadio San Marcos, Lima
Attendance: 0
Referee: Gaby Oncoy
29 August 2021
15:00

Universitario	1–0	Sporting Cristal
Flores 77'	Report

Estadio San Marcos, Lima
Attendance: 0
Referee: Priscila Vásquez

=== Final ===
4 September 2021
16:00

Alianza Lima	1–0	Universitario
Romero 13'	Report

Estadio San Marcos, Lima
Attendance: 0
Referee: Elizabeth Tintaya

== Top scorers ==
As of 4 September 2021

Rank	Name	Club	Goals
1	(Peru) Adriana Lúcar	Alianza Lima	23
2	(Venezuela) Neidy Romero	Alianza Lima	15
3	(Peru) Sabrina Ramírez	Universitario	12
4	(Peru) Julia Mamani	Carlos A. Mannucci	11
4	(Peru) Milena Tomayconsa	Universitario	11
6	(Peru) Miryam Tristán	Alianza Lima	10
7	(Peru) Luz Campoverde	Carlos A. Mannucci	8
7	(Peru) Xioczana Canales	Universitario	8
7	(Peru) Irina Cruz	Atlético Trujillo	8
7	(Peru) María José Parró	Universidad César Vallejo	8
