= 2022 Liga Femenina FPF =

Liga Femenina
- Season: 2022
- Dates: Regular stage: 2 April – 14 August; Play-offs: 20 August – 6 October
- Champions: Alianza Lima (2nd title)
- Relegated: UTC; Sport Boys
- Copa Libertadores: Alianza Lima
- Matches: 117
- Goals: 378 (3.23 per match)
- Top goalscorer: Luz Campoverde (18 goals)
- Biggest home win: Alianza Lima 11–0 UTC (11 June)
- Biggest away win: Sport Boys 1–8 Carlos A. Mannucci (30 April)
- Highest scoring: Alianza Lima 11–1 Atlético Trujillo (30 April)
- All statistics correct as of 6 October 2022.

The 2022 Liga Femenina, also known as Liga Femenina Pluspetrol 2022 for sponsorship reasons, was the 24th season of the Peruvian Primera División Femenina (and the second one under the currently format), the highest level of Peruvian women's football. The season began on 2 April and ended on 30 November.

Unlike the previous season, the tournament was played in a decentralized way with each team playing matches at their respective home stadium.

Alianza Lima were the defending champions and successfully retained their title after defeating Carlos A. Mannucci 4–1 on aggregate in the finals. As champions, Alianza Lima qualified for the 2022 Copa Libertadores Femenina.

== Competition format ==
The season was divided into two stages: Regular stage and Play-offs. The regular stage was played under a single round-robin format with the 13 teams playing each other once for a total of 12 matches per team (6 matches at home and 6 away matches).

For the play-offs stage, the 13 teams were split into two groups of 6 and 7 (championship play-offs and relegation play-offs respectively) according to their final placement in the regular stage. The championship play-offs were contested by teams ranked 1st to 6th in the regular stage, the 6 teams played in a hexagonal where they faced other teams once for a total of 5 matches per team. The top four teams from the hexagonal advanced to the single-leg semi-finals with teams ranked 1st and 2nd hosting the matches. Winners of semi-finals played the finals on a home-and-away two-legged basis to decide the national champion, while losers played the single-leg third place play-off. Originally, the final was scheduled to be played in Lima on a single-leg format.

The relegation play-offs were contested by teams ranked 7th to 13th in the regular stage, the 7 teams played in a heptagonal where they faced other teams once for a total of 6 matches per team. After the last matchday, the team placed 7th was relegated to the 2023 Liga de Ascenso Femenina while the team placed 6th played a promotion play-off against the runners-up of the 2022 Copa Perú Femenina, winners of this play-off played the 2023 Liga Femenina while the losers played in the 2023 Liga de Ascenso Femenina.

== Teams ==
A total of 13 teams played in the 2022 Liga Femenina season, the same ones that played in the previous 2021 season.

=== Stadia and locations ===
Locations of the 2022 Liga Femenina teams

Team	Manager	City	Stadium	Capacity
Academia Cantolao	(Peru) Vivian Ayres	Callao	Miguel Grau	17,000
Alianza Lima	(Peru) Samir Mendoza	Lima	Alejandro Villanueva	35,000
Atlético Trujillo	(Peru) Danny Pita	Trujillo	Mansiche	25,000
Ayacucho	(Peru) Hugo Rodríguez	Ayacucho	Ciudad de Cumaná	15,000
Carlos A. Mannucci	(Peru) Luis Cordero	Trujillo	Mansiche	25,000
Deportivo Municipal	(Peru) Karen Palacios	Lima	Iván Elías Moreno	10,000
Killas	(Peru) Olienka Salinas	Lima	Andrés Bedoya Díaz	10,000
Sport Boys	(Peru) Rivelino Carassa	Callao	Miguel Grau	17,000
Sporting Cristal	(Brazil) Doriva Bueno	Lima	Alberto Gallardo	18,000
Universidad César Vallejo	(Peru) Marcos Flores	Trujillo	Mansiche	25,000
Universidad San Martín	(Peru) Miguel Granados	Lima	Alberto Gallardo	18,000
Universitario	(Peru) Paolo Maldonado	Lima	Monumental	80,093
UTC	(Peru) Edwin Arévalo	Cajamarca	Héroes de San Ramón	18,000

== Regular stage ==
=== Standings ===
Pos	Team	Pld	W	D	L	GF	GA	GD	Pts	Qualification
1	Alianza Lima	12	11	1	0	53	4	+49	34	Advance to Championship play-offs
2	Universitario	12	11	0	1	37	5	+32	33	Advance to Championship play-offs
3	Carlos A. Mannucci	12	10	1	1	43	11	+32	31	Advance to Championship play-offs
4	Sporting Cristal	12	8	0	4	33	12	+21	24	Advance to Championship play-offs
5	Universidad César Vallejo	12	6	2	4	21	13	+8	20	Advance to Championship play-offs
6	Atlético Trujillo	12	5	1	6	15	35	−20	16	Advance to Championship play-offs
7	Ayacucho	12	4	3	5	11	19	−8	15	Advance to Relegation play-offs
8	Deportivo Municipal	12	4	2	6	14	25	−11	14	Advance to Relegation play-offs
9	Academia Cantolao	12	3	4	5	24	22	+2	13	Advance to Relegation play-offs
10	Killas	12	3	3	6	15	13	+2	12	Advance to Relegation play-offs
11	Universidad San Martín	12	2	0	10	8	40	−32	6	Advance to Relegation play-offs
12	UTC	12	1	1	10	6	52	−46	4	Advance to Relegation play-offs
13	Sport Boys	12	1	0	11	7	36	−29	3	Advance to Relegation play-offs

Source: FPF, ADFP
Rules for classification: 1) Points; 2) Goal difference; 3) Goals for; 4) Drawing of lots.

=== Results ===
The match schedule was decided based on the draw which was held on 8 March 2022.

Home \ Away	ALI	ATR	AYA	CAN	CAM	MUN	KIL	SBA	SCR	UCV	USM	UNI	UTC
Alianza Lima		11–1				2–0		5–0	2–0		8–0		11–0
Atlético Trujillo			1–0	1–1		1–2	2–0	2–1		0–2			
Ayacucho	0–2			2–1	0–3 (Note: Match awarded 0–3 to Carlos A. Mannucci due to a breach of article 93 of the Liga Femenina 2022 regulations by Ayacucho (absence of two type II ambulances), which caused the match to be suspended.)		1–1			1–0		0–1	
Academia Cantolao	1–4				2–3				1–2	0–0		0–4	8–1
Carlos A. Mannucci	1–1	7–0							2–1		3–0	1–2	3–0
Deportivo Municipal			1–1	3–3	2–7		1–0	1–2		1–3			
Killas	0–1			1–1	0–1					0–0		1–2	4–0
Sport Boys			0–1	1–3	1–8		1–2			0–3		0–4	
Sporting Cristal		4–1	6–0			3–0	3–2	4–0			5–0		
Universidad César Vallejo	1–4				2–4				1–0		3–0	0–3	6–0
Universidad San Martín		2–3	0–2	0–3 (Note: Match awarded 0–3 to Cantolao due to a breach of article 93 of the Liga Femenina 2022 regulations by Universidad San Martín (absence of two type II ambulances), which caused the match to be suspended.)		1–2	0–4	2–1					
Universitario	0–2	4–0				2–0			3–0		6–1		6–0
UTC		1–3	3–3			0–1		1–0	0–5		0–2		

Source: FPF, ADFP
Legend: Blue = home team win; Yellow = draw; Red = away team win.

== Play-offs ==
The match schedule of Play-offs stage was announced on 16 August 2022.

=== Championship play-offs ===
In the championship play-offs, teams ranked 1st and 2nd in the regular stage started with 2 and 1 extra points respectively. Points earned during the regular stage did not carry over during the hexagonal.

==== Hexagonal table ====
Pos	Team	Pld	W	D	L	GF	GA	GD	Pts	Qualification	ALI	CAM	UNI	SCR	UCV	ATR
1	Alianza Lima	5	5	0	0	17	2	+15	17	Advance to semi-finals		3–1	2–1		6–0	
2	Carlos A. Mannucci	5	4	0	1	12	8	+4	12	Advance to semi-finals					3–2	2–0
3	Universitario	5	3	0	2	12	6	+6	10	Advance to semi-finals		3–4			3–0	
4	Sporting Cristal	5	1	1	3	2	8	−6	4	Advance to semi-finals	0–2	0–2	0–3			
5	Universidad César Vallejo	5	1	0	4	4	14	−10	3					0–1		2–1
6	Atlético Trujillo	5	0	1	4	2	11	−9	1		0–4		0–2	1–1		

Updated to match(es) played on 11 September 2022. Source: FPF
Legend: Blue = home team win; Yellow = draw; Red = away team win.

==== Bracket ====
The semi-final matchups were:

- SF1: Hexagonal 1st place vs. Hexagonal 4th place
- SF2: Hexagonal 2nd place vs. Hexagonal 3rd place

Semifinals
1	Alianza Lima	0 (4)
4	Sporting Cristal	0 (3)
2	Carlos A. Mannucci	0 (4)
3	Universitario	0 (1)

Finals
Alianza Lima	1	3	4
Carlos A. Mannucci	1	0	1

==== Semi-finals ====
In the semi-finals, if a match was level at the end of normal 90 minutes playing time, extra time was not played and a penalty shoot-out was used to determine the winners.

17 September 2022
15:00

Alianza Lima	0–0	Sporting Cristal
Penalties
Adriana Lúcar (penalty scored); Sofía García (penalty scored); Sandra Arévalo (penalty scored); Neidy Romero (penalty scored); Jhoseline Miranda (penalty missed)	4–3	Maca López (penalty missed); Yelitza Toledo (penalty scored); Karen López (penalty scored); María Alejandra Espejo (penalty scored); Alondra Vílchez (penalty missed)

Estadio Alejandro Villanueva, Lima
Referee: Gaby Oncoy
18 September 2022
14:00

Carlos A. Mannucci	0–0	Universitario
Penalties
Irina Cruz (penalty scored); Némesis Leal (penalty scored); Carolina Arbeláez (penalty scored); Birka Ruiz (penalty scored)	4–1	Cindy Novoa (penalty scored); Nahomi Martínez (penalty missed); Geraldine Cisneros (penalty missed)

Estadio Mansiche, Trujillo
Referee: Robin Segura

==== Third place playoff ====
24 September 2022
15:00

Universitario	3–0	Sporting Cristal
Cindy Novoa 39'; Stephanie Vásquez 60'; Geraldine Cisneros 89'

Estadio Monumental, Lima
Attendance: 0
Referee: Hilbert Villegas

==== Finals ====
The format of the final was changed from a single-leg match to a home-and-away two-legged series.

25 September 2022
14:00

Carlos A. Mannucci	1–1	Alianza Lima
Luz Campoverde 42'	Report	Adriana Lúcar 32'

Estadio Mansiche, Trujillo
Referee: Bruno Pérez
6 October 2022
19:00

Alianza Lima	3–0	Carlos A. Mannucci
Sandy Dorador 31'; Heidy Padilla 50'; Adriana Lúcar 90+1'	Report

Estadio Alejandro Villanueva, Lima
Attendance: 30,000
Referee: Edwin Ordóñez

=== Relegation play-offs ===
In the relegation play-offs, teams ranked 13th and 12th in the regular stage started with 2 and 1 points less respectively. Points earned during the regular stage did not carry over during the heptagonal.

==== Heptagonal table ====
Pos	Team	Pld	W	D	L	GF	GA	GD	Pts	Relegation	KIL	AYA	CAN	MUN	USM	UTC	SBA
1	Killas	6	3	3	0	12	2	+10	12			0–0		1–1	2–1		4–0
2	Ayacucho	6	3	3	0	8	3	+5	12					1–1	1–0	3–1	2–0
3	Academia Cantolao	6	3	2	1	12	5	+7	11		0–0	1–1		1–3			4–0
4	Deportivo Municipal	6	2	3	1	10	8	+2	9						1–2	2–1	
5	Universidad San Martín	6	2	1	3	9	8	+1	7				0–3			5–0	
6	UTC (R)	6	1	0	5	5	19	−14	2	Advance to Relegation play-off	0–5		1–3				
7	Sport Boys (R)	6	0	2	4	4	15	−11	0	Relegation to 2023 Liga de Ascenso Femenina				2–2	1–1	1–2	

Updated to match(es) played on 17 September 2022. Source: FPF
Legend: Blue = home team win; Yellow = draw; Red = away team win.
(R) Relegated

==== Relegation play-off ====
30 November 2022
11:00

UTC	0–2	Sporting Victoria
		Zulianita Vela 28' (pen.); Venus Ancana 48'

Estadio Municipal de La Molina, Lima
Referee: Milagros Arruela

== Top scorers ==
As of 6 October 2022

Rank	Name	Club	Goals
1	(Peru) Luz Campoverde	Carlos A. Mannucci	18
2	(Peru) Adriana Lúcar	Alianza Lima	17
3	(Peru) Alondra Vílchez	Sporting Cristal	14
4	(Venezuela) Neidy Romero	Alianza Lima	12

== See also ==
- 2022 Copa Perú Femenina
