= IRAS 10565+2448 =

Galaxy in the constellation Leo

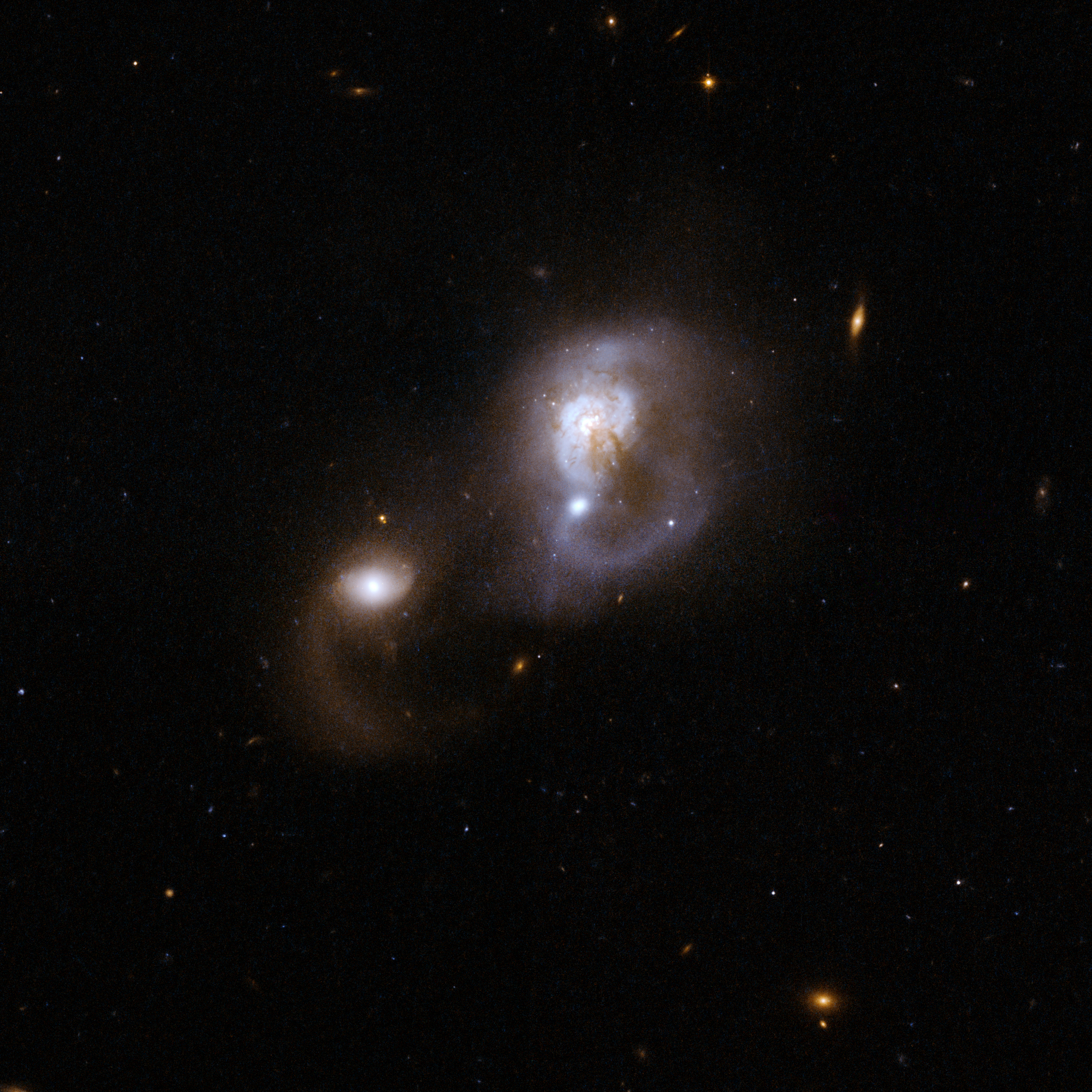
- HST image of IRAS 10565+2448

Observation data (J2000 epoch)
- Constellation: Leo
- Right ascension: 10^{h} 59^{m} 18.13^{s}
- Declination: +24° 32′ 34.54″
- Redshift: 0.043100
- Heliocentric radial velocity: 12,921 km/s
- Distance: 625 Mly (191.62 Mpc)
- Apparent magnitude (B): 15.7

Characteristics
- Type: LINER; ULIRG, HII
- Apparent size (V): 0.4' x 0.3'
- Notable features: luminous infrared galaxy

Other designations
- IRAS F10565+2448, 2XMM J105918.1+243234, PGC 33083, NVSS J105918+243235, LEDA 1709876

IRAS 10565+2448 known as IRAS F10565+2448, is a galaxy merger located in the constellation of Leo. It is located at a distance of 625 million light years from Earth. It is classified as an ultraluminous infrared galaxy with an infrared luminosity of 1.2×10^{12} L_{Θ}. It has a star formation rate of 131.8 M_{Θ} yr^{−1}.

IRAS 10565+2448 has a disturbed morphology. The large galaxy in the system shows dust lanes running through its main body while the smaller galaxy (the westernmost object), has a curved tidal tail pulled downwards from the object. A third galaxy is possibly shown as secondary smaller nucleus located northwest from the primary nucleus in the large galaxy. It is also a late-stage merger as both east and west nuclei components in the system have a projected separation of 6.7 kiloparsecs. It has an obscured X-ray emission with a luminosity of both L_{SX} = 1.21×10^{41} erg s^{−1} and L_{HX} = 1.6×10^{41} erg s^{−1}. The source appears as Compton-thin obscurer with an absorption column density of 0.05+0.07
−0.04×10^{22} cm^{−2}.

The large galaxy in the IRAS 10565+2448 is found to be active. It is categorized as a H II galaxy and a starburst galaxy. It is more luminous when compared to its smaller companion galaxy. It contains a superficial and broad blueshifted HI absorption interpreted as molecular outflows with a mass rate of 140 M_{Θ} yr^{−1} suggesting it is driven by a radio jet. The large galaxy also shows detections of dust continuum, J = 4-3 ground rotational transition of carbon monoxide (CO) and atomic carbon. It has a compact radio source appearing structured at 8.44 GHz with a rotating CO ring found nearly-face on but lesser inside an outer disk beyond the galaxy's nuclear ring.

The smaller galaxy contains a source of CO(1–0) emission. It has blue and redshifted CO(1–0) wings with an approximate size of 2.15 ± 0.32 kiloparsecs and 2.22 ± 0.30 kiloparsecs based on a circular Gaussian fit. However, the emission from the CO(1–0) narrow core is more condensed than its wings. There is also proof of a plume of CO(1–0) stretching southwest at blueshifted velocities of –150 km^{−1} and systematic velocity.
