= Miryam Tristán =

Peruvian footballer (born 1985)

Personal information
- Full name: Miryam Veruzhka Tristán Mancilla
- Date of birth: 19 April 1985 (age 41)
- Place of birth: Lima, Peru
- Position: Left winger

Senior career*
Years	Team	Apps	(Gls)
2003	Universitario		
2004	Petro Perú		
2006–?	JC Sport Girls		
?	Navy Bay Colón		
?	River San Borja		
?–2018	Club La Cantera		
2019	Deportivo Municipal		
2020–2023	Alianza Lima		

International career^{‡}
2002–2004	Peru U20	1+	(2)
2003–2021	Peru	24+	(13)
- * Club domestic league appearances and goals ‡ National team caps and goals as of 15 June 2026

Miryam Veruzhka Tristán Mancilla (born 19 April 1985) is a Peruvian footballer who played as a left winger for Alianza Lima and the Peru women's national team.

== International career ==
Tristán represented Peru at the 2004 South American U-19 Women's Championship. At senior level, she played three Copa América Femenina editions (2003, 2006 and 2010) and the 2019 Pan American Games.

=== International goals ===
Scores and results list Peru's goal tally first

No.	Date	Venue	Opponent	Score	Result	Competition
1	13 April 2003	Estadio Monumental "U", Lima, Peru	Chile	2–1	2–1	2003 South American Women's Football Championship
2	13 August 2005	Estadio Hernán Ramírez Villegas, Pereira, Colombia	Venezuela	1–0	5–1	2005 Bolivarian Games
3	13 August 2005	Estadio Hernán Ramírez Villegas, Pereira, Colombia	Venezuela	2–0	5–1	2005 Bolivarian Games
4	13 August 2005	Estadio Hernán Ramírez Villegas, Pereira, Colombia	Venezuela	3–0	5–1	2005 Bolivarian Games
5	14 August 2005	Estadio Hernán Ramírez Villegas, Pereira, Colombia	Ecuador	?–0	4–0	2005 Bolivarian Games
6	14 August 2005	Estadio Hernán Ramírez Villegas, Pereira, Colombia	Ecuador	?–0	4–0	2005 Bolivarian Games
7	15 August 2005	Estadio Hernán Ramírez Villegas, Pereira, Colombia	Colombia	1–0	2–0	2005 Bolivarian Games
8	19 August 2005	Estadio Hernán Ramírez Villegas, Pereira, Colombia	Bolivia	1–0	3–0	2005 Bolivarian Games
9	19 August 2005	Estadio Hernán Ramírez Villegas, Pereira, Colombia	Bolivia	3–0	3–0	2005 Bolivarian Games
10	20 August 2005	Estadio Hernán Ramírez Villegas, Pereira, Colombia	Colombia	1–0	3–0	2005 Bolivarian Games
11	20 August 2005	Estadio Hernán Ramírez Villegas, Pereira, Colombia	Colombia	2–0	3–0	2005 Bolivarian Games
12	19 November 2006	Estadio José María Minella, Mar del Plata, Argentine	Paraguay	1–2	1–2	2006 South American Women's Football Championship
13	6 October 2010	Estadio Bellavista, Ambato, Ecuador	Ecuador	1–0	1–2	2010 South American Women's Football Championship

== Honours ==
Alianza Lima

- Primera División Peruana (2): 2021, 2022

Peru

- Bolivarian Games (1): 2005
