= Caroline Shevlin =

Peruvian footballer (born 1989)

Personal information
- Full name: Caroline Coral Shevlin Ormachea
- Birth name: Caroline Coral Shevlin
- Date of birth: 17 September 1989 (age 37)
- Place of birth: Columbia, Missouri, U.S.
- Height: 1.65 m (5 ft 5 in)
- Positions: Centre-back; midfielder

Youth career
- Westview Wolverines

College career
Years	Team	Apps	(Gls)
2007–2008	Long Beach State 49ers		
2009–2010	Saint Mary's Gaels		

Senior career*
Years	Team	Apps	(Gls)
- San Diego WFC SeaLions

International career^{‡}
2006	Peru U20	?	(0)
2006	Peru	4	(0)
- * Club domestic league appearances and goals ‡ National team caps and goals as of 19 November 2006.

Caroline Coral Shevlin Ormachea (born 17 September 1989) is a former footballer who played as a centre-back or midfielder. Born in the United States, she represented Peru at international level.

== Early life ==
Shevlin was raised in San Diego, California. She was born to an American father and a Peruvian mother.

== High school and college career ==
Shevlin has attended the Westview High School in San Diego, the California State University in Long Beach and the Saint Mary's College of California in Moraga.

== Club career ==
Shevlin has played for San Diego WFC SeaLions in the United States.

== International career ==
Shevlin represented Peru at the 2006 South American U-20 Women's Championship. She capped at senior level during the 2006 South American Women's Football Championship.

== Personal life ==
Shevlin's twin sister Grace Shevlin is also a former Peruvian international footballer.
