= 2022 Copa Perú Femenina =

Copa Perú Femenina
- Season: 2022
- Champions: Melgar
- Promoted: Defensores del Ilucán; Melgar; Sporting Victoria

The 2022 Copa Perú Femenina season (Spanish: Copa Perú Femenina 2022) was an amateur women's football championship, developed, organized, and promoted by the Peruvian Football Federation (FPF), which granted two direct promotion spots to the 2023 Liga Femenina. This was the 3rd edition of the Women's Peru Cup and for the first time it had a second-division character, granting direct promotion to the Liga Femenina.

In 2020, the main tournament was renamed as Liga Femenina while the Campeonato Nacional de Fútbol Femenino served as the basis for structuring the second-level league competition that was designated as Copa Perú Femenina.

== Departmental Stage ==
Department	Team	Location
Amazonas	Real Chachapoyas	Chachapoyas
Ancash	Academia Real Áncash	Huaraz
Apurímac	Atlético Andahuaylas	Andahuaylas
Arequipa	Melgar	Arequipa
Ayacucho	Player Villafuerte	Huanta
Cajamarca	Defensores del Ilucán	Cutervo
Callao	Aviar Soccer	Ventanilla
Cusco	San Francisco de Asís	Chincheros
Huánuco	Botica 24 Horas	Ambo
Huánuco	2 de Enero	Acomayo
Huancavelica	Golden Girls	Lircay
Ica	Diosdado Franco Luján	Ica
Junín	Ramiro Villaverde Lazo	Huancayo
Junín	Flamengo	El Tambo

Department	Team	Location
La Libertad	Universitario de Trujillo	Trujillo
Lambayeque	Fuerza Leonardina	Chiclayo
Lima	Colmillo Comas	Breña
Loreto	Sporting Victoria	Iquitos
Madre de Dios	—	—
Moquegua	Bolívar Academia UJCM	Moquegua
Pasco	Deportivo Municipal (Villa Rica)	Villa Rica
Pasco	Peñarol Huarautambo	Huarautambo
Piura	Alianza Atlético	Sullana
Puno	FST Barza San Román	Juliaca
San Martín	Real Juanjuí	Juanjuí
Tacna	Virgen de la Natividad	Tacna
Tumbes	UNT	Tumbes
Ucayali	Nuevo Pucallpa	Pucallpa

== Regional Stage ==
=== Region I ===
==== First round ====
Team 1	Score	Team 2
Real Chachapoyas	7–0	UNT
Alianza Atlético	5–2	Fuerza Leonardina

==== Second round ====
Team 1	Score	Team 2
Alianza Atlético	4–2	UNT
Real Chachapoyas	6–4	Fuerza Leonardina

==== Third round ====
Team 1	Score	Team 2
Fuerza Leonardina	–	UNT
Real Chachapoyas	3–2	Alianza Atlético

=== Region II ===
==== Semifinals ====
Team 1	Score	Team 2
Universitario de Trujillo	–	Academia Real Áncash
Defensores del Ilucán	4–1	Real Juanjuí

==== Final ====
Team 1	Score	Team 2
Defensores del Ilucán	2–0	Universitario de Trujillo

=== Region III ===
Team 1	Score	Team 2
Sporting Victoria	4–1	Nuevo Pucallpa

=== Region IV ===
Team 1	Score	Team 2
Colmillo Comas FC	8–1	Aviar Soccer

=== Region V ===
==== First round ====
Team 1	Score	Team 2
Botica 24 Horas	2–1	2 de Enero
Flamengo	0–0	Ramiro Villaverde Lazo
Deportivo Municipal (Villa Rica)	2–1	Peñarol Huarautambo

==== Second round ====
Team 1	Score	Team 2
Ramiro Villaverde Lazo	8–0	Deportivo Municipal (Villa Rica)
2 de Enero	5–2	Flamengo
Peñarol Huarautambo	0–4	Botica 24 Horas

==== Third round ====
Team 1	Score	Team 2
Flamengo	–	Peñarol Huarautambo
Deportivo Municipal (Villa Rica)	–	2 de Enero
Botica 24 Horas	–	Ramiro Villaverde Lazo

==== Semifinals ====
Team 1	Score	Team 2
2 de Enero	4–2	Flamengo
Ramiro Villaverde Lazo	2–1	Botica 24 Horas

==== Final ====
Team 1	Score	Team 2
Ramiro Villaverde Lazo	1–1 (3–2 p)	2 de Enero

=== Region VI ===
Team 1	Score	Team 2
Player Villafuerte	1–1	Golden Girls
Golden Girls	1–1	Diosdado Franco Luján
Diosdado Franco Luján	1–1 (4–3 p)	Player Villafuerte

=== Region VII ===
Team 1	Score	Team 2
Virgen de la Natividad	5–1	Bolívar Academia UJCM
Melgar	1–0	Bolívar Academia UJCM
Melgar	2–1	Virgen de la Natividad

=== Region VIII ===
Team 1	Score	Team 2
San Francisco de Asís	3–1	FST Barza San Román
San Francisco de Asís	1–1	Atlético Andahuaylas
Atlético Andahuaylas	5–0	FST Barza San Román

== National Stage ==
=== Bracket ===
Quarterfinals
Melgar	3
Atlético Andahuaylas	2
Sporting Victoria	2 (3)
Colmillo Comas FC	2 (1)
Defensores del Ilucán	3
Real Chachapoyas	2
Diosdado Franco Luján	2
Ramiro Villaverde Lazo	1

Semifinals
Melgar	0 (4)
Sporting Victoria	0 (3)
Defensores del Ilucán	1 (5)
Diosdado Franco Luján	1 (3)

Finals
Melgar	1
Defensores del Ilucán	0

=== Fase I: Quarterfinals ===
12 November 2022	Diosdado Franco Luján	2–1	Ramiro Villaverde Lazo	Estadio Andrés Bedoya Díaz, Lima
09:00

12 November 2022	Sporting Victoria	2–2 (3–1 p)	Colmillo Comas FC	Estadio Andrés Bedoya Díaz, Lima
11:30

12 November 2022	Melgar	3–2	Atlético Andahuaylas	Estadio Cajonahuaylla de San Jerónimo, Cusco
15:00

13 November 2022	Defensores del Ilucán	3–2	Real Chachapoyas	Estadio Cesar Flores Marigorda, Lambayeque
11:00

=== Fase II: Semifinals ===
25 November 2022	Melgar	0–0 (4–3 p)	Sporting Victoria	Estadio Municipal de La Molina, Lima
11:00

25 November 2022	Defensores del Ilucán	1–1 (5–3 p)	Diosdado Franco Luján	Estadio Municipal de La Molina, Lima
15:00

=== Fase III: Finals ===
==== Third Place Playoff ====
27 November 2022	Sporting Victoria	4–2	Diosdado Franco Luján	Estadio Municipal de La Molina, Lima
10:00

==== Final ====
27 November 2022	Melgar	1–0	Defensores del Ilucán	Estadio Municipal de La Molina, Lima
14:00

== See also ==
- 2022 Liga Femenina
