= Lourdes Ortiz (footballer) =

Paraguayan footballer (born 1987)

Personal information
- Full name: Lourdes Elizabeth Ortiz Vallejos
- Date of birth: 1 July 1987 (age 39)
- Height: 1.60 m (5 ft 3 in)
- Positions: Midfielder; forward

Senior career*
Years	Team	Apps	(Gls)
- Sportivo Luqueño
- Cerro Porteño

International career
2006	Paraguay U20	4+	(5)
2006–2014	Paraguay	11	(4)
- * Club domestic league appearances and goals

Lourdes Elizabeth Ortiz Vallejos (born 1 July 1987) is a Paraguayan footballer who plays as a midfielder or forward. She was a member of the Paraguay women's national team and of the national U20 squad.

== International career ==
Ortiz represented Paraguay at the 2006 South American U-20 Women's Championship. At senior level, she played in three Copa América Femenina editions (2006, 2010 and 2014).

=== International goals ===
Scores and results list Paraguay's goal tally first

No.	Date	Venue	Opponent	Score	Result	Competition
1	13 November 2006	Estadio José María Minella, Mar del Plata, Argentina	Bolivia	1–0	5–1	2006 South American Women's Football Championship
2	18 September 2014	Estadio Alejandro Serrano Aguilar, Cuenca, Ecuador	Bolivia	3–1	10–2	2014 Copa América Femenina
3	18 September 2014	Estadio Alejandro Serrano Aguilar, Cuenca, Ecuador	Bolivia	9–2	10–2	2014 Copa América Femenina
4	20 September 2014	Estadio Jorge Andrade, Azogues, Ecuador	Chile	1–0	3–2	2014 Copa América Femenina
