= Phil Shevlin =

American chemist

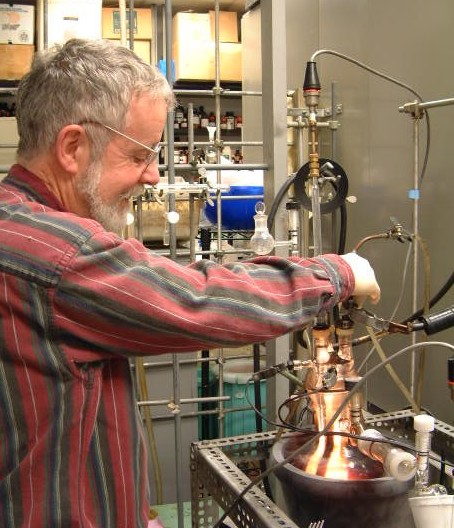

Academic background
- Education: BS, Lafayette College; MS, PhD, Yale University
- Website: webhome.auburn.edu/~shevlpb/

Philip B. Shevlin is an American experimental chemist. Before his retirement, Shevlin served as the Mosley Professor of Science and Humanities at Auburn University. His special field of expertise is centered on the chemistry of high energy reactive intermediates. These intermediates include atomic carbon, carbenes, monovalent carbon species, and other energetic molecules. Shevlin is also involved in the synthesis of a variety of carbocyclic and heterocyclic nucleoside analogs.

== Education ==
Shevlin completed his Bachelor of Science degree at Lafayette College and his Master of Science and PhD at Yale University.

== Career ==
After completing two years of post-doctoral work at Brookhaven National Laboratory, Shevlin accepted an assistant professorship in the Department of Chemistry at Auburn University (AU) in 1970. Upon joining the faculty at AU, Shevlin was awarded a grant from the American Chemical Society to study the production of carbon atoms in the decomposition of 5-diazotetrazole. He was promoted to associate professor of chemistry in 1974 In an effort to "encourage excellence in teaching and research among faculty," Shevlin was named AU's Alumni Associate Professor of Chemistry in 1977. He was named a Fellow of the American Association for the Advancement of Science in 1993.

In 1998, Shelvin was named the W. Kelly Mosley Professor of Sciences and Humanities.

== Books ==
- Shevlin, P. B. and Campbell, O. A.. Concepts of Science; Kendall/Hunt: Dubuque, IA, 2nd Edition, 1995.
- Shevlin, P. B., Concepts of Science; Kendall/Hunt: Dubuque, IA, 1993.
