= Atomic carbon =

Chemical compound

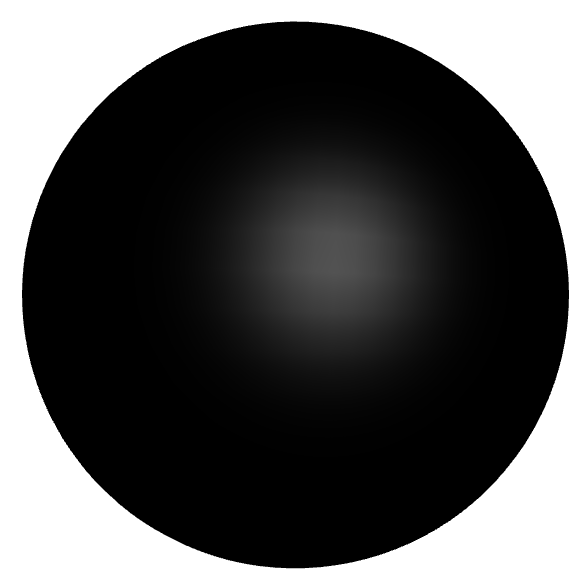

Names
- IUPAC name Atomic carbon
- Systematic IUPAC name Methanediylidene (substitutive); Carbon (additive)
- Other names monocarbon; monatomic carbon; monoatomic carbon

Identifiers
CAS Number	7440-44-0
3D model (JSmol)	Interactive image
ChEBI	CHEBI:27594
ChemSpider	4575370
ECHA InfoCard	100.028.321
PubChem CID	5462310
UNII	2P3VWU3H10
CompTox Dashboard (EPA)	DTXSID9027651
- InChI: InChI=1S/C Key: OKTJSMMVPCPJKN-UHFFFAOYSA-N
- SMILES: [C]

Properties
Chemical formula	C
Molar mass	12.011 g·mol^{−1}
- Except where otherwise noted, data are given for materials in their standard state (at 25 °C [77 °F], 100 kPa). verify (what is ?) Infobox references

Atomic carbon, systematically named carbon and λ^{0}-methane, is a colourless gaseous inorganic chemical with the chemical formula C (also written [C]). It is kinetically unstable at ambient temperature and pressure, being removed through autopolymerisation.

Atomic carbon is the simplest of the allotropes of carbon, and is also the progenitor of carbon clusters. In addition, it may be considered to be the monomer of all (condensed) carbon allotropes like graphite and diamond.

== Nomenclature ==
The trivial name monocarbon is the most commonly used and preferred IUPAC name. The systematic name carbon, a valid IUPAC name, is constructed according to the compositional nomenclature. However, as a compositional name, it does not distinguish between different forms of pure carbon. The systematic name λ^{0}-methane, also valid IUPAC name, is constructed according to the substitutive nomenclature. Along with monocarbon, this name does distinguish the titular compound as they derived using structural information about the molecule. To better reflect its structure, free atomic carbon is often written as [C]. λ^{2}-methylium ([CH]^{+}) is the ion resulting from the gain of H^{+} by atomic carbon.

== Properties ==
=== Amphotericity ===
A Lewis acid can join with an electron pair of atomic carbon, and an electron pair of a Lewis base can join with atomic carbon by adduction:

:[C] + M → [MC]
[C] + :L → [CL]

Because of this donation or acceptance of an adducted electron pair, atomic carbon has Lewis amphoteric character. Atomic carbon has the capacity to donate up to two electron pairs to Lewis acids, or accept up to two pairs from Lewis bases.

A proton can join with the atomic carbon by protonation:

C + H^{+} → CH^{+}

Because of this capture of the proton (H^{+}), atomic carbon and its adducts of Lewis bases, such as water, also have Brønsted–Lowry basic character. Atomic carbon's conjugate acid is λ^{2}-methylium (CH^{+}).

H_{3}O^{+} + C ⇌ H_{2}O + CH^{+}

Aqueous solutions of adducts are however, unstable due to hydration of the carbon centre and the λ^{2}-methylium group to produce λ^{2}-methanol (CHOH) or λ^{2}-methane (CH_{2}), or hydroxymethylium (CH_{2}OH^{+}) groups, respectively.

H_{2}O + C → CHOH
H_{2}O + CH^{+} → CH_{2}OH^{+}

The λ^{2}-methanol group in adducts can potentially isomerise to form formaldehyde, or be further hydrated to form methanediol. The hydroxymethylium group in adducts can potentially be further hydrated to form dihydroxymethylium (CH(OH)^{+}_{2}), or be oxidised by water to form formylium (HCO^{+}).

=== Electromagnetic properties ===
The electrons in atomic carbon are distributed among the atomic orbitals according to the aufbau principle to produce unique quantum states, with corresponding energy levels. The state with the lowest energy level, or ground state, is a triplet diradical state (^{3}P_{0}), closely followed by ^{3}P_{1} and ^{3}P_{2}. The next two excited states that are relatively close in energy are a singlet (^{1}D_{2}) and singlet diradical (^{1}S_{0}). The non-radical state of atomic carbon is systematically named λ^{2}-methylidene, and the diradical states that include the ground state is named carbon(2•) or λ^{2}-methanediyl. The ^{1}D_{2} and ^{1}S_{0} states lie 121.9 kJ mol^{−1} and 259.0 kJ mol^{−1} above the ground state, respectively. Transitions between these three states are formally forbidden from occurring due to the requirement of spin flipping and or electron pairing. This means that atomic carbon phosphoresces in the near-infrared region of the electromagnetic spectrum at 981.1 nm. It can also fluoresce in infrared and phosphoresce in the blue region at 873.0 nm and 461.9 nm, respectively, upon excitation by ultraviolet radiation.

The different states of atomic carbon exhibits varying chemical behaviours. For example, reactions of the triplet radical with non-radical species generally involves abstraction, whereas reactions of the singlet non-radical involves not only abstraction, but also addition by insertion.

[C]^{2•}(^{3}P_{0}) + H_{2}O → [CHOH] → [CH] + [HO]
[C](^{1}D_{2}) + H_{2}O → [CHOH] → CO + H_{2} or H_{2}CO

== Production ==
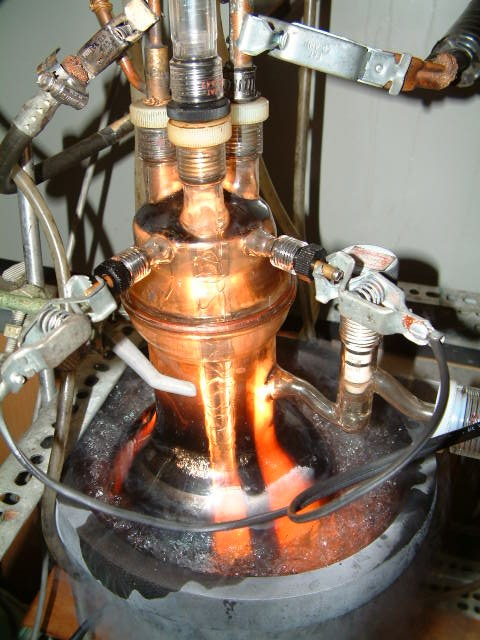
Making atomic carbon: The source of light is the electrical arcing between two carbon rods. Liquid nitrogen cools the reaction vessel. The black substance is soot.

One method of synthesis, developed by Phil Shevlin who has done the principal work in the field, is by passing a large current through two adjacent carbon rods, generating an electric arc. The way this species is made is closely related to the formation of fullerenes C_{60}, the chief difference being that a much lower vacuum is used in atomic carbon formation.

Atomic carbon is generated in the thermolysis of 5-diazotetrazole upon extrusion of 3 equivalents of dinitrogen:

CN_{6} → :C: + 3N_{2}

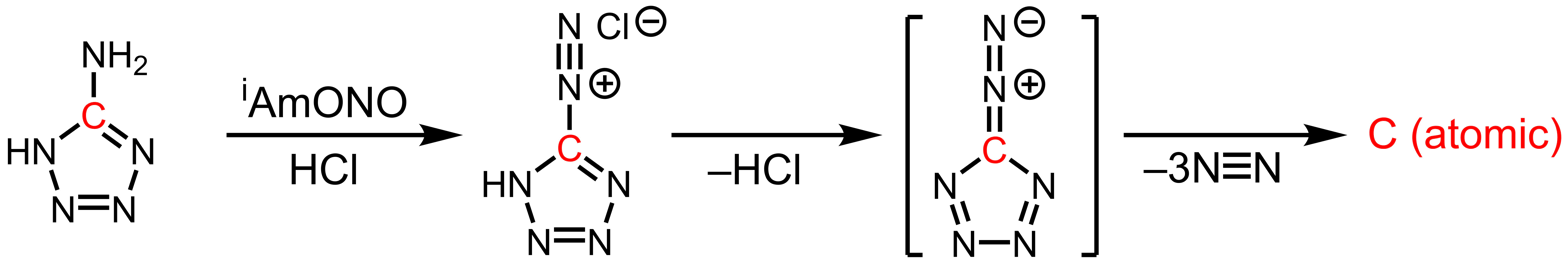

A clean source of atomic carbon can be obtained based on the thermal decomposition of tantalum carbide. In the developed source, carbon is loaded into a thin-walled tantalum tube. After being sealed, it is heated by direct electric current. The solvated carbon atoms diffuse to the outer surface of the tube and, when the temperature rises, the evaporation of atomic carbon from the surface of the tantalum tube is observed. The source provides purely carbon atoms without presence of any additional species.

=== Carbon suboxide decarbonylation ===
Atomic carbon can be produced by carbon suboxide decarbonylation. In this process, carbon suboxide decomposes to produce atomic carbon and carbon monoxide according to the equation:

C_{3}O_{2} → 2 CO + [C]

The process involves dicarbon monoxide as an intermediate, and occurs in two steps. Photolytic far ultraviolet radiation is needed for both decarbonylations.

1. OCCCO → [CCO] + CO
2. [CCO] → CO + [C]

== Uses ==
Normally, a sample of atomic carbon exists as a mixture of excited states in addition to the ground-state in thermodynamic equilibrium. Each state contributes differently to the reaction mechanisms that can take place. A simple test used to determine which state is involved is to make use of the diagnostic reaction of the triplet state with O_{2}, if the reaction yield is unchanged it indicates that the singlet state is involved. The diradical ground-state normally undergoes abstraction reactions. Atomic carbon has been used to generate "true" carbenes by the abstraction of oxygen atoms from carbonyl groups:

R_{2}C=O + :C: → R_{2}C: + CO

Carbenes formed in this way will exhibit true carbenic behaviour. Carbenes prepared by other methods such as diazo compounds, might exhibit properties better attributed to the diazo compound used to make the carbene (which mimic carbene behaviour), rather than to the carbene itself. This is important from a mechanistic understanding of true carbene behaviour perspective.

== Reactions ==
As atomic carbon is an electron-deficient species, it spontaneously autopolymerises in its pure form, or converts to an adduct upon treatment with a Lewis acid or base. Oxidation of atomic carbon gives carbon monoxide, whereas reduction gives λ^{2}-methane. Non-metals, including oxygen, strongly attack atomic carbon, forming divalent carbon compounds:

2 [C] + O_{2} → 2 CO

Atomic carbon is highly reactive; most reactions are very exothermic. They are generally carried out in the gas phase at liquid nitrogen temperatures (77 K). Typical reactions with organic compounds include:

- Insertion into a C−H bond in alkanes to form a carbene
- Deoxygenation of carbonyl groups in ketones and aldehydes to form a carbene, 2-butanone forming 2-butanylidene.
- Insertion into carbon−carbon double bonds to form a cyclopropylidene which undergoes ring-opening, a simple example being insertion into an alkene to form a cumulene.

With water insertion into the O−H bond forms the carbene, H−C−OH that rearranges to formaldehyde, HCHO.
