= 2006 South American U-20 Women's Championship =

Tournament details
- Host country: Chile
- Cities: Viña del Mar; Valparaíso
- Dates: 4–20 January
- Teams: 10
- Venues: 2 (in 2 host cities)

Final positions
- Champions: Brazil (2nd title)
- Runners-up: Argentina
- Third place: Paraguay
- Fourth place: Peru

Tournament statistics
- Matches played: 26
- Goals scored: 105 (4.04 per match)
- Top scorer: (Brazil) Marta (14 goals)

The 2006 South American Under-20 Women's Football Championship was the second edition of South American youth women's football championship and the first with an age limit of 20 years. It was held from 4 to 20 January 2006 in Viña del Mar and Valparaíso, Chile. Team Brazil won this tournament and along with team Argentina, qualified for the 2006 FIFA U-20 Women's World Championship.

== First round ==
=== Group A ===
Team	Pld	W	D	L	GF	GA	GD	Pts
Brazil	4	4	0	0	28	1	+27	12
Peru	4	2	1	1	6	9	–3	7
Chile	4	1	1	2	9	15	–6	4
Venezuela	4	0	3	1	5	12	–7	3
Uruguay	4	0	1	3	3	14	–11	1

4 January 2006
19:00

Chile	1 – 8	Brazil
Coihuin 74'	Report	Marta 9', 45', 66', 75'; Francielle 10'; Adriane 30', 35'; Josiane 81'

Estadio Sausalito, Viña del Mar
Referee: Adriana Correa (Colombia)
4 January 2006
21:00

Peru	1 – 0	Uruguay
Dorador 39'

Estadio Sausalito, Viña del Mar
Referee: Cándida Colque (Bolivia)
6 January 2006
19:00

Brazil	8 – 0	Uruguay
Renata 8'; Marta 13', 16', 58', 78'; Maurine 34'; Adriane 39'; Monica 79'	Report

Estadio Sausalito, Viña del Mar
Referee: Norma González (Paraguay)
6 January 2006
21:00

Chile	2 – 2	Venezuela
Pardo 27'; Rojas 30'	Report	Ramírez 28'; Castañeda 61' (o.g.)

Estadio Sausalito, Viña del Mar
Referee: Estela Álvarez (Argentina)
8 January 2006
19:00

Peru	1 – 1	Venezuela
Dorador 45'	Report	Lovera 40'

Estadio Sausalito, Viña del Mar
Referee: Cándida Colque (Bolivia)
8 January 2006
21:00

Chile	3 – 1	Uruguay
Coihuin 29'; Herrera 52'; Rojas 73'	Report	Maggiolini 78'

Estadio Sausalito, Viña del Mar
Referee: María Edilma García (Colombia)
10 January 2006
19:00

Uruguay	2 – 2	Venezuela
Rusch 46', 54'	Report	Gamboa 21'; Girón 73'

Estadio Sausalito, Viña del Mar
Referee: Adriana Correa (Colombia)
10 January 2006
21:00

Brazil	5 – 0	Peru
Luana 27'; Renata 37', 46'; Marta 85' (pen.), 86'

Estadio Sausalito, Viña del Mar
Referee: María Edilma García (Colombia)
12 January 2006
19:00

Brazil	7 – 0	Venezuela
Renata 3'; Fabiana 20'; Marta 36'; Danielli 55'; Josiane 73'; Adrianne 81', 86'	Report

Estadio Sausalito, Viña del Mar
Referee: Norma González (Paraguay)
12 January 2006
21:00

Chile	3 – 4	Peru
Quezada 7', 19'; Pardo 41'	Report	Morote 4', 60'; G. Shevlin 6'; Dorador 38'

Estadio Sausalito, Viña del Mar
Referee: Estela Álvarez (Argentina)

=== Group B ===
Team	Pld	W	D	L	GF	GA	GD	Pts
Argentina	4	3	1	0	11	3	+8	10
Paraguay	4	3	0	1	10	6	+4	9
Colombia	4	2	0	2	10	8	+2	6
Bolivia	4	1	1	2	5	11	–6	4
Ecuador	4	0	0	4	2	10	–8	0

5 January 2006
19:00

Ecuador	1 – 2	Paraguay
Suntaxi 73' (pen.)		Benítez 79', 90+3'

Estadio Elías Figueroa Brander, Valparaíso
Referee: Mabel Leyes (Uruguay)
5 January 2006
21:00

Colombia	7 – 2	Bolivia
Usme 37', 78'; Velásquez 41', 83', 89'; Palacios 58', 87'	Report	Moreno 61', 84'

Estadio Elías Figueroa Brander, Valparaíso
Referee: Sueli Tortura (Brazil)
7 January 2006
19:00

Colombia	1 – 3	Argentina
Palacios 65'	Report	Hirmbruchner 16'; Blanco 28'; Potassa 77'

Estadio Elías Figueroa Brander, Valparaíso
Referee: Silvia Regina Oliveira (Brazil)
7 January 2006
21:00

Bolivia	1 – 3	Paraguay
Morón 75'	Report	Quintana 11', 44'; Ortiz 22'

Estadio Elías Figueroa Brander, Valparaíso
Referee: Alejandra Trucidos (Uruguay)
9 January 2006
19:00

Argentina	0 – 0	Bolivia
	Report

Estadio Elías Figueroa Brander, Valparaíso
Referee: Marilyn Angulo (Venezuela)
9 January 2006
21:00

Ecuador	0 – 1	Colombia
	Report	Moscoso 82'

Estadio Elías Figueroa Brander, Valparaíso
Referee: Sueli Tortura (Brazil)
11 January 2006
19:00

Paraguay	3 – 1	Colombia
Benítez 17'; Villamayor 23'; Ortiz 81'		Moscoso 32'

Estadio Elías Figueroa Brander, Valparaíso
Referee: Silvia Regina Oliveira (Brazil)
11 January 2006
21:00

Argentina	5 – 0	Ecuador
González 22'; Manicler 27'; Potassa 38'; Pereyra 59'; Hirmbruchner 70'	Report

Estadio Elías Figueroa Brander, Valparaíso
Referee: Alejandra Trucidos (Uruguay)
13 January 2006
19:00

Bolivia	2 – 1	Ecuador
Morón 64', 90+2'	Report	Gallardo 71'

Estadio Elías Figueroa Brander, Valparaíso
Referee: Mabel Leyes (Uruguay)
13 January 2006
21:00

Paraguay	2 – 3	Argentina
Ortiz 8', 22'		Pereyra 59'; Potassa 70'; González 90+2'

Estadio Elías Figueroa Brander, Valparaíso
Referee: Sueli Tortura (Brazil)

== Final round ==
Team	Pld	W	D	L	GF	GA	GD	Pts
Brazil	3	2	1	0	9	1	+8	7
Argentina	3	1	1	1	4	1	+3	4
Paraguay	3	1	1	1	3	5	–2	4
Peru	3	0	1	2	0	9	–9	1

16 January 2006
19:00

Paraguay	1 – 1	Brazil
Rodríguez 18'	Report	Josiane 84'

Estadio Elías Figueroa Brander, Valparaíso
Referee: Cándida Colque (Bolivia)
16 January 2006
21:00

Argentina	0 – 0	Peru
	Report

Estadio Elías Figueroa Brander, Valparaíso
Referee: Mabel Leyes (Uruguay)
18 January 2006
18:00

Brazil	7 – 0	Peru
Adriane 3'; Marta 6', 45', 49' (pen.); Renata 17'; Maurine 31'; Josiane 81'	Report

Estadio Sausalito, Viña del Mar
Referee: Estela Álvarez (ARG)
18 January 2006
20:00

Argentina	4 – 0	Paraguay
Potassa 26', 44'; Manicler 54', 87'	Report

Estadio Sausalito, Viña del Mar
Referee: Adriana Correa (Colombia)
20 January 2006
18:00

Peru	0 – 2	Paraguay
	Report	Riveros 14'; Ortiz 16'

Estadio Sausalito, Viña del Mar
Referee: Silvia Regina Oliveira (Brazil)
20 January 2006
20:00

Brazil	1 – 0	Argentina
Renata 86'	Report

Estadio Sausalito, Viña del Mar
Referee: María Edilma García (Colombia)

2006 South American Women's U-20 Football champions

Brazil
Second title
