= Emily Flores =

Peruvian footballer (born 1990)

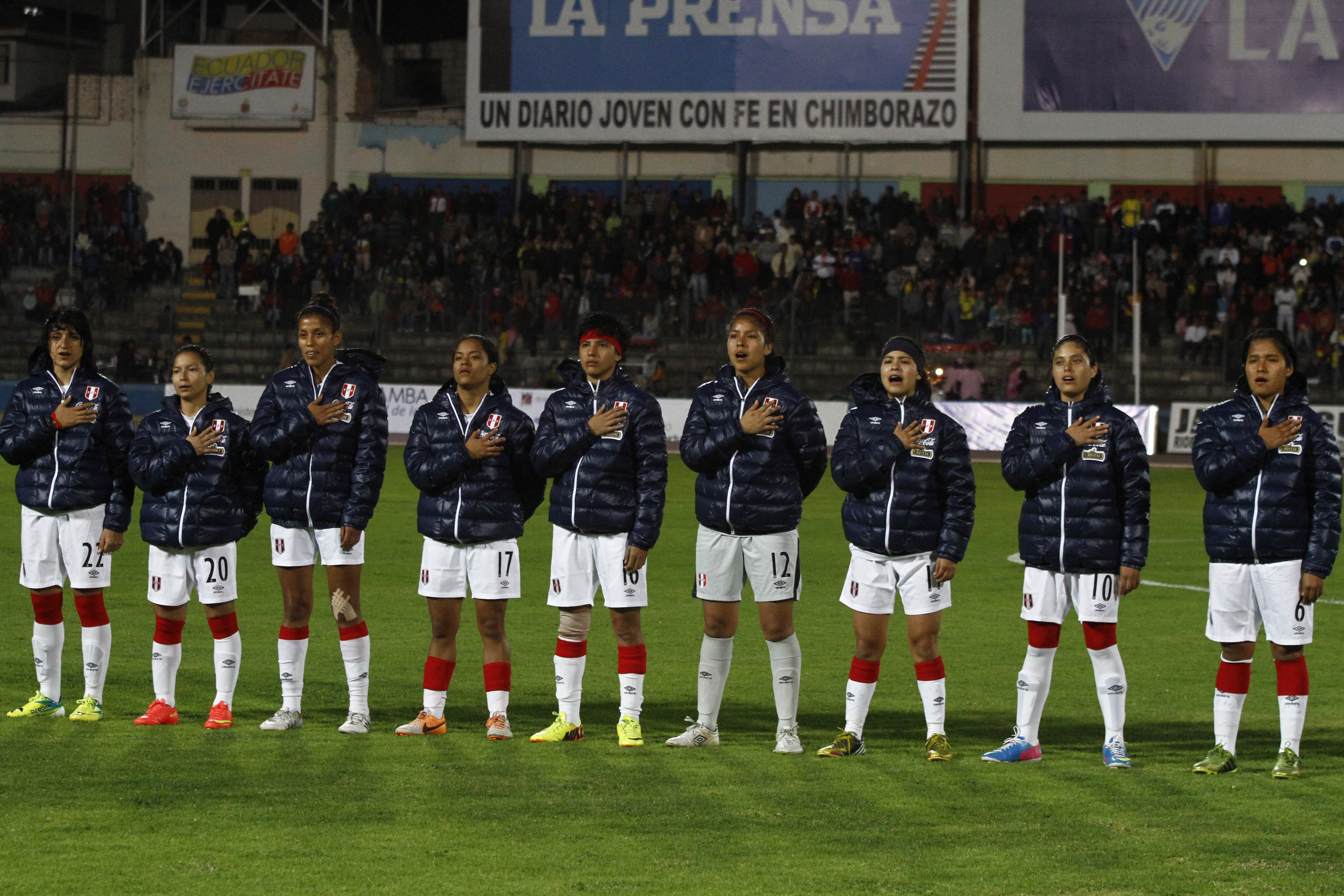
- Flores representing Peru at the 2014 Copa América Femenina

Personal information
- Full name: Emily Luz Flores Castel
- Date of birth: 10 September 1990 (age 36)
- Place of birth: Lima, Peru
- Height: 1.49 m (4 ft 10 1/2 in)
- Position: Attacking midfielder

Team information
- Current team: Universidad César Vallejo

Senior career*
Years	Team	Apps	(Gls)
–2018	Universitario		
2019–2026	Universidad César Vallejo		

International career^{‡}
2014–	Peru	8	(1)
- * Club domestic league appearances and goals ‡ National team caps and goals as of 6 August 2019

Emily Luz Flores Castel (born 10 September 1990) is a Peruvian footballer who plays as an attacking midfielder for CD Universidad César Vallejo and the Peru women's national team.

== International career ==
Flores made her senior debut for Peru in 2014. She was a member of the Peruvian squad that played in the 2014 Copa América Femenina and the 2019 Pan American Games.

=== International goals ===
Scores and results list Peru's goal tally first

No.	Date	Venue	Opponent	Score	Result	Competition
1	15 September 2014	Estadio Olímpico de Riobamba, Riobamba, Ecuador	Uruguay	1–0	1–2	2014 Copa América Femenina
