= Sandy Dorador =

Peruvian footballer (born 1989)

Gladys Dorador
Personal information
- Full name: Gladys Dorador Inga
- Date of birth: 4 January 1989 (age 37)
- Place of birth: Lima, Peru
- Height: 1.60 m (5 ft 3 in)
- Position: Forward

Team information
- Current team: Alianza Lima

Senior career*
Years	Team	Apps	(Gls)
- White Star
–2018	JC Sport Girls		
2019–	Sporting Cristal		

International career^{‡}
2006–2008	Peru U20	3+	(3)
2006–	Peru	6	(1)
2017	Peru (futsal)	2+	(4)
- * Club domestic league appearances and goals ‡ National team caps and goals as of 6 August 2019

Gladys “Sandy” Dorador Inga (born 4 January 1989) is a Peruvian footballer who plays as a forward for Sporting Cristal and the Peru women's national team.

== International career ==
Dorador represented Peru at the 2006 South American U-20 Women's Championship. At senior level, she played the 2006 South American Women's Football Championship and the 2019 Pan American Games.

=== International goals ===
Scores and results list Peru's goal tally first

No.	Date	Venue	Opponent	Score	Result	Competition
1	15 November 2006	Estadio José María Minella, Mar del Plata, Argentina	Bolivia	2–1	2–1	2006 South American Women's Football Championship
2	30 November 2021	Estadio Gunther Vogel, San Lorenzo, Paraguay	Paraguay	1–0	2–4	Friendly
3	5 April 2025	Estadio Iván Elías Moreno, Lima, Peru	Cuba	2–1	2–3	Friendly
4	8 April 2025	Estadio Iván Elías Moreno, Lima, Peru	Cuba	1–0	3–2	Friendly
5	8 April 2025	Estadio Iván Elías Moreno, Lima, Peru	Cuba	3–0	3–2	Friendly
