= Club Atlético Trujillo =

Atlético Trujillo
- Full name: Asociación Civil Club Atlético Trujillo
- Founded: May 8, 2014; 10 years ago
- Ground: Municipal Víctor Raúl Haya de La Torre, El Porvenir District, Trujillo
- Chairman: (Peru) Walter León
- Manager: (Peru) Danny Pita
- League: Liga Femenina
Home colours	Away colours	Third colours

Asociación Civil Club Atlético Trujillo (sometimes referred as Atlético Trujillo) are a Peruvian women's football club based in Trujillo.

== History ==
The Asociación Civil Club Atlético Trujillo was founded on May 8, 2014 and play in the Liga Femenina.

The club was founded in 2014 with the idea of contributing to the development of women's football in the La Libertad Region, with Mr. Walter León as the founder. It is characterized by being a non-profit institution, whose main objective is to play a leading role by dedicating itself exclusively to women's football.

During the development of the institution, it collaborated by training players, as well as participating in the various regional tournaments organized by the Peruvian Football Federation. It has also nurtured players to clubs in the region such as Juventud Talentos, to mention an example.

Currently, decided to actively participate in the national football circuit through the Liga Femenina.

== See also ==
- List of football clubs in Peru
- Peruvian football league system
