= Neidy Romero =

Venezuelan footballer (born 1995)

Personal information
- Full name: Neidy Katherine Romero Mendoza
- Date of birth: 14 February 1995 (age 31)
- Place of birth: Ciudad Guayana, Venezuela
- Height: 1.74 m (5 ft 9 in)
- Positions: Defender; midfielder

Senior career*
Years	Team	Apps	(Gls)
–2014	UCV FC		
2014–2016	Caracas		
2017	Cúcuta Deportivo		
2018	Carneras Ups	11	(0)

International career^{‡}
2014	Venezuela U20	?	(0)
2014	Venezuela	5	(0)
- * Club domestic league appearances and goals as of 1 July 2018 ‡ National team caps and goals as of 25 November 2014

Neidy Katherine Romero Mendoza (born 14 February 1995) is a Venezuelan footballer who plays as a defender. She has been a member of the Venezuela women's national team.

== International career ==
Romero represented Venezuela at the 2014 South American U-20 Women's Championship. At senior level, she played the 2014 Copa América Femenina and the 2014 Central American and Caribbean Games.
